= 2009–10 Women's A Basketball League of Serbia =

- League: Serbian First League
- Sport: Basketball
- Duration: 8 October 2009 – 25 April 2010
- Number of games: 148
- Number of teams: 12

2009–10
- Season champions: Partizan (4th title)
- Season MVP: (Serbia) Dajana Butulija

Serbian First League seasons
- ← 2008–09 2010–11 →

The 2009–10 Women's A Basketball League of Serbia is the 4th season of the First Women's Basketball League of Serbia, the highest professional basketball league in Serbia. It is also 66th national championship played by Serbian clubs inclusive of nation's previous incarnations as Yugoslavia and Serbia & Montenegro.

The first part of the season consists of 12 teams and 132-game regular season began on 8 October 2009 and will end on 21 March 2010. The second part of the season is the Play Off.

== Regular season ==
The League part of the season was played with 12 teams and play a dual circuit system, each with each one game at home and away. The four best teams at the end of the regular season were placed in the Play Off. The regular season began on 8 October 2009 and it will end on 21 March 2010.

| Place | Team | Pld | W | L | PF | PA | Diff | Pts | |
|---|---|---|---|---|---|---|---|---|---|
| 1. | Partizan | 22 | 22 | 0 | 1865 | 1365 | +500 | 44 | Play Off |
| 2. | Hemofarm | 22 | 18 | 4 | 1842 | 1324 | +518 | 40 | Play Off |
| 3. | Radivoj Korać | 22 | 15 | 7 | 1698 | 1491 | +207 | 37 | Play Off |
| 4. | Vojvodina | 22 | 14 | 8 | 1530 | 1458 | +72 | 36 | Play Off |
| 5. | Voždovac | 22 | 14 | 8 | 1701 | 1578 | +123 | 36 | Play Off |
| 6. | Crvena zvezda | 22 | 13 | 9 | 1645 | 1551 | +94 | 35 | Play Off |
| 7. | Proleter Zrenjanin | 22 | 8 | 14 | 1422 | 1591 | -169 | 30 | Play Off |
| 8. | Čelarevo | 22 | 8 | 14 | 1549 | 1666 | -117 | 30 | Play Off |
| 9. | Kovin | 22 | 6 | 16 | 1500 | 1747 | -247 | 28 | |
| 10. | Radnički Kragujevac | 22 | 5 | 17 | 1406 | 1697 | -291 | 27 | |
| 11. | Spartak Subotica | 22 | 5 | 17 | 1470 | 1700 | -230 | 27 | |
| 12. | Loznica | 22 | 4 | 18 | 1248 | 1708 | -460 | 26 | |

| Qualified for Play Off |

== Play Off ==
Play Off is played according to the cup system. Champion is received after the final was played. In all parts of Play Off was played on 2 wins. Play Off is played from 5 to 24 April 2010.

Quarter-finals
1 | Partizan | 2
8 | Čelarevo | 0
4 | Vojvodina | 1
5 | Voždovac | 2
2 | Hemofarm | 2
7 | Proleter Zrenjanin | 0
3 | Radivoj Korać | 2
6 | Crvena zvezda | 1

Semifinals
1 | Partizan | 2
5 | Voždovac | 0
2 | Hemofarm | 2
3 | Radivoj Korać | 0

Finals
1 | Partizan | 2
2 | Hemofarm | 0

== Awards ==
- Player of the Year: Dajana Butulija (175-G-86) of Partizan
- Guard of the Year: Jovana Vukoje (174-G-86) of Voždovac
- Forward of the Year: Dajana Butulija of Partizan
- Center of the Year: Jelena Velinović (193-C-81) of Crvena zvezda
- Newcomer of the Year: Marija Prlja (162-G-87) of Voždovac
- Most Improved Player of the Year: Tijana Ajduković (197-C-91) of Spartak Subotica
- Import Player of the Year: Saša Čađo (172-G-89) of Hemofarm
- Domestic Player of the Year: Dajana Butulija of Partizan
- Defensive Player of the Year: Marija Prlja of Partizan
- Coach of the Year: Marina Maljković of Partizan

1st Team

- Sheena Moore (170-G-84) of Partizan
- Jovana Vukoje of Voždovac
- Dajana Butulija of Partizan
- Ivana Grubor (185-F/C-84) of Radivoj Korać
- Jelena Velinović of Crvena zvezda

2nd Team

- Marija Prlja of Voždovac
- Biljana Stanković (176-G-74) of Hemofarm
- Anja Stupar (178-F/C-89) of Vojvodina
- Jelica Domazet (188-F/C-88) of Čelarevo
- Tijana Ajduković of Spartak Subotica

Honorable Mention

- Sanja Orozović (184-G-90) of Spartak Subotica
- Iva Musulin (170-G-84) of Radivoj Korać
- Tina Jovanović (191-F/C-91) of Radivoj Korać
- Tamara Radočaj (168-G-87) of Hemofarm
- Mirjana Beronja (170-G-86) of Partizan
- Verica Stojiljković (166-G-79) of Radnički Kragujevac
- Milica Kravić (180-F-85) of Proleter Zrenjanin
- Maja Škorić (184-F-89) of Čelarevo

All-Domestic Players Team

- Biljana Stanković of Hemofarm
- Jovana Vukoje of Voždovac
- Dajana Butulija of Partizan
- Ivana Grubor of Radivoj Korać
- Jelena Velinović of Crvena zvezda

All-Imports Team

- Sheena Moore of Partizan
- Maja Milutinović (177-G-87) of Hemofarm
- Saša Čađo of Hemofarm
- Anja Stupar of Vojvodina
- Daliborka Vilipić (196-C-75) of Hemofarm

All Defensive Team

- Marija Prlja of Voždovac
- Dunja Prčić (180-G-87) of Partizan
- Anja Stupar of Vojvodina
- Marina Morača (180-F-85) of Čelarevo
- Tijana Ajduković of Spartak Subotica

All-Newcomers Team

- Marija Prlja of Voždovac
- Milena Radošević (173-G/F-87) of Čelarevo
- Nevena Jovanović (179-G-90) of Kovin, then she moved to Radivoj Korać
- Ivana Jovanović (185-F/C-85) of Proleter Zrenjanin
- Ivana Brajković (195-C-93) of Radivoj Korać
