= 2008–09 First Women's Banca Intesa League =

- League: Serbian First League
- Sport: Basketball
- Duration: 11 October 2008 – 9 April 2009
- Number of games: 140
- Number of teams: 12

2008–09
- Season champions: Hemofarm (9th title)
- Season MVP: (Serbia) Tamara Radočaj

Serbian First League seasons
- ← 2007–08 2009–10 →

The 2008–09 First Women's Banca Intesa League is the 3rd season of the First Women's Basketball League of Serbia, the highest professional basketball league in Serbia. It is also 65th national championship played by Serbian clubs inclusive of nation's previous incarnations as Yugoslavia and Serbia & Montenegro.

The first part of the season consists of 12 teams and 132-game regular season began on 11 October 2008 and will end on 14 March 2009. The second part of the season is the Play Off.

== Regular season ==
The League part of the season was played with 12 teams and play a dual circuit system, each with each one game at home and away. The four best teams at the end of the regular season were placed in the Play Off. The regular season began on 11 October 2008 and it will end on 14 March 2009.

| Place | Team | Pld | W | L | PF | PA | Diff | Pts | |
|---|---|---|---|---|---|---|---|---|---|
| 1. | Hemofarm | 22 | 21 | 1 | 0 | 0 | +0 | 43 | Play Off |
| 2. | Vojvodina NIS | 22 | 18 | 4 | 0 | 0 | +0 | 40 | Play Off |
| 3. | Partizan | 22 | 17 | 5 | 0 | 0 | +0 | 39 | Play Off |
| 4. | Crvena zvezda (-1) | 22 | 15 | 7 | 0 | 0 | +0 | 36 | Play Off |
| 5. | Spartak Subotica | 22 | 14 | 8 | 0 | 0 | +0 | 36 | |
| 6. | Proleter Zrenjanin | 22 | 10 | 12 | 0 | 0 | +0 | 32 | |
| 7. | Radivoj Korać | 22 | 10 | 12 | 0 | 0 | +0 | 32 | |
| 8. | Kovin | 22 | 9 | 13 | 0 | 0 | +0 | 31 | |
| 9. | Čelarevo | 22 | 7 | 15 | 0 | 0 | +0 | 29 | |
| 10. | Loznica | 22 | 6 | 16 | 0 | 0 | +0 | 28 | |
| 11. | Kraljevo | 22 | 5 | 17 | 0 | 0 | +0 | 27 | Relegation |
| 12. | Ušće | 22 | 0 | 22 | 0 | 0 | +0 | 22 | Relegation |

| Qualified for Play Off |
| Relegated to Second League |

== Play Off ==
Play Off is played according to the cup system. Champion is received after the final was played. In all parts of Play Off was played on 2 wins. Play Off is played from 24 March to 9 April 2009.

Semifinals
1 | Hemofarm | 2
4 | Crvena zvezda | 0
2 | Vojvodina | 1
3 | Partizan | 2

Final
1 | Hemofarm | 3
3 | Partizan | 0

== Awards ==
- Player of the Year: Tamara Radočaj (168-G-87) of Hemofarm
- Guard of the Year: Tamara Radočaj of Hemofarm
- Forward of the Year: Anja Stupar (178-F/C-89) of Vojvodina NIS
- Center of the Year: Biljana Stjepanović (189-C-87) of Partizan
- Newcomer of the Year: Maja Škorić (184-F-89) of Čelarevo
- Most Improved of the Year: Iva Roglić (189-F-88) of Crvena zvezda
- Import Player of the Year: Hanna Tsikhamirava (175-G-88) of Hemofarm
- Domestic Player of the Year: Tamara Radočaj of Hemofarm
- Defensive Player of the Year: Anja Stupar of Vojvodina NIS
- Coach of the Year: Marina Maljković of Hemofarm

1st Team

- Tamara Radočaj of Hemofarm
- Biljana Stanković (176-G-74) of Hemofarm
- Anja Stupar of Vojvodina NIS
- Jela Vidačić (190-C-85) of Proleter Zrenjanin
- Biljana Stjepanović of Partizan

2nd Team

- Iva Musulin (170-G-84) of Radivoj Korać
- Dajana Butulija (175-G-86) of Hemofarm
- Bojana Janković (185-F-83) of Partizan
- Dragana Vuković (190-C-78) of Radivoj Korać
- Tina Jovanović (191-F/C-91) of Loznica

Honorable Mention

- Miljana Musović (180-G-87) of Crvena zvezda
- Rada Vidović (177-G-79) of Spartak Subotica
- Ivana Todorović (187-C-73) of Kraljevo
- Marina Morača (180-F-85) of Čelarevo
- Jelena Dangubić (177-G-82) of Partizan
- Nataša Đorđević (178-G-85) of Kovin
- Minja Šiljegović (188-F-80) of Vojvodina NIS
- Ivana Mihailović (173-G-82) of Kraljevo
- Mirjana Velisavljević (187-C-78) of Kovin
- Maja Šćekić (170-G-87) of Vojvodina NIS
- Dara Kovačević (197-C-83) of Hemofarm
- Jelena Radić (193-C-87) of Partizan
- Dragana Gobeljić (185-F-88) of Proleter Zrenjanin
- Ivana Grubor (185-F/C-84) of Vojvodina NIS
- Iva Roglić of Crvena zvezda

All-Domestic Players Team

- Tamara Radočaj of Hemofarm
- Biljana Stanković of Hemofarm
- Anja Stupar of Vojvodina NIS
- Jela Vidačić of Proleter Zrenjanin
- Biljana Stjepanović of Partizan

All-Defensive Team

- Marina Ristić (168-G-87) of Spartak Subotica
- Dunja Prčić (180-G-87) of Crvena zvezda
- Anja Stupar of Vojvodina NIS
- Iva Roglić of Crvena zvezda
- Jelena Maksimović (192-C-82) of Crvena zvezda

All-Newcomers Team

- Marija Jugović (170-G-90) of Loznica
- Jelena Jovanović (184-F-90) of Radivoj Korać
- Maja Škorić of Čelarevo
- Maja Vučurović (188-F-91) of Radivoj Korać
- Tijana Ajduković (197-C-91) of Spartak Subotica
