= 2010–11 Women's A Basketball League of Serbia =

- League: Serbian First League
- Sport: Basketball
- Duration: 9 October 2010 – 25 April 2010
- Games: 155
- Teams: 13

2010–11
- Season champions: Partizan (5th title)
- Season MVP: (Serbia) Dajana Butulija

Serbian First League seasons
- ← 2009–10 2011–12 →

The 2010–11 Women's A Basketball League of Serbia was the 5th season of the First Women's Basketball League of Serbia, Serbia's highest-level professional basketball league. It was also known as the 67th national championship, and included Serbian clubs from the nation's previous incarnations as Yugoslavia and Serbia and Montenegro.

The first part of the season consisted of 72 games played between nine different teams (nine games for each team). The season began on 9 October 2010 and ended on 19 February 2011. The second part of the season, referred to as "Superleague", featured inter-league play between four teams from the Adriatic League and four teams from the First Women's Basketball League of Serbia. The third part of the season featured two parts, Playoffs and Play-Out.

== Team information ==
Team	City	Arena	Capacity
Crvena zvezda	Belgrade	Železnik Hall	3,000
Hemofarm	Vršac	Millennium Center	5,000
Kovin	Kovin	Kovin Hall	1,000
Loznica	Loznica	Lagator	2,000
Partizan	Belgrade	Belgrade Sport Palace	5,000
Proleter Zrenjanin	Zrenjanin	Medison Hall	3.000
Radivoj Korać	Belgrade	SC Šumice/Sport EKO Hall	2,000/1,000
Radnički Kragujevac	Kragujevac	Hall Gordana Goca Bogojević	600
Spartak Subotica	Subotica	Sport Palace Subotica	3,500
Student Niš	Niš	Dušan Radović School Hall	1,000
Vojvodina	Novi Sad	SPC Vojvodina	1,030
Voždovac	Belgrade	SC Šumice	2,000
Čelarevo	Čelarevo	SD Čelarevo	400

Teams from Adriatic League

== Regular season ==
The regular season, which ran from 9 October 2010 to 19 February 2011, consisted of dual circuit play between nine teams. Each team played one home game and one away game. The four best teams at the end of the regular season moved on to the Superleague, while the remaining teams moved on to Play Out.

Place	Team	Pld	W	L	PF	PA	Diff	Pts	
1.	Hemofarm	16	16	0	1386	810	+576	32	Superleague
2.	Spartak Subotica	16	11	5	1156	1069	+84	27	Superleague
3.	Crvena zvezda	16	10	6	1303	1184	+119	26	Superleague
4.	Čelarevo	16	10	6	1173	1125	+48	26	Superleague
5.	Kovin	16	8	8	1179	1289	-110	24	Play Out
6.	Proleter Zrenjanin	16	5	11	942	1064	-122	21	Play Out
7.	Student Niš	16	5	11	1016	1199	-183	21	Play Out
8.	Loznica	16	4	12	875	1106	-231	20	Play Out
9.	Radnički Kragujevac	16	3	13	1032	1213	-181	19	Play Out

Qualified for Superleague
Relegation for Play Out

== Superleague ==
The Superleague, which ran from 9 March 2011 to April 2011, consisted of dual circuit play between eight teams, four each from the Adriatic League and the First Women's Basketball League of Serbia. Each team played one home game and one away game. The four best teams at the end of the regular season moved on to the playoffs.

Place	Team	Pld	W	L	PF	PA	Diff	Pts	
1.	Hemofarm	14	14	0	1077	746	+331	28	Play Off
2.	Partizan	14	11	3	1160	888	+272	25	Play Off
3.	Radivoj Korać	14	10	4	1073	919	+154	25	Play Off
4.	Vojvodina	14	8	6	860	944	-84	22	Play Off
5.	Voždovac	14	6	8	961	930	+31	20	
6.	Crvena zvezda	14	3	11	1029	1217	-188	17	
7.	Spartak Subotica	14	2	12	894	1127	-233	16	
8.	Čelarevo	14	2	12	825	1108	-283	16	

== Playoffs ==
The playoffs, which ran from 13 April to 25 April 2011, proceeded according to the cup system. The semifinals were played at 2 wins, the final at 3 wins.

Semifinals
1	Hemofarm	2
4	Vojvodina	0
2	Partizan	2
3	Radivoj Korać	0

Final
1	Hemofarm	0
2	Partizan	3

== Play Out ==
Play Out, which ran from 9 March 2011 to 16 April 2011, was played as a round robin. The worst ranked team, ŽKK Kovin, was relegated to the Second League of Serbia.

Place	Team	Pld	W	L	PF	PA	Diff	Pts	
1.	Proleter Zrenjanin	8	7	1	564	481	+83	15	
2.	Loznica	8	5	3	499	472	+27	13	
3.	Radnički Kragujevac	8	4	4	528	558	-30	12	
4.	Student Niš	8	3	5	553	570	-17	11	
5.	Kovin	8	1	7	594	657	-63	9	Relegation

== Awards ==
- Player of the Year: Dajana Butulija (175-86) of Partizan
- Guard of the Year: Dajana Butulija (175-86) of Partizan
- Forward of the Year: Aleksandra Čabarkapa (186-F-86) of Vojvodina
- Center of the Year: Jela Vidačić (190-C-85) of Proleter Zrenjanin
- Import Player of the Year: Latoya Williams (193-C-87) of Partizan
- Domestic Player of the Year: Dajana Butulija (175-86) of Partizan
- Defensive Player of the Year: Latoya Williams (193-C-87) of Partizan
- Coach of the Year: Marina Maljković of Partizan

1st Team

- G: Dajana Butulija (175-86) of Partizan
- G: Sanja Orozović (184-90) of Spartak Subotica
- G: Milica Dabović (175-82) of Partizan
- F/C: Tina Jovanović (192-91) of Radivoj Korać
- C: Jela Vidačić (190-85) of Proleter Zrenjanin

2nd Team

- G: Tamara Radočaj (168-87) of Hemofarm
- G: Jovana Popović (173-90) of Crvena zvezda
- F: Aleksandra Čabarkapa (186-86) of Vojvodina
- C: Vladinka Erak (190-84) of Vojvodina
- C: Latoya Williams (193-87) of Partizan

Honorable Mention

- Biljana Stanković (176-G-74) of Hemofarm
- Milana Živadinović (173-G-91) of Vojvodina
- Marija Ilić (190-C-85) of Student Niš
- Ana Nikšić (181-F-91) of Crvena zvezda
- Dara Kovačević (197-C-83) of Hemofarm
- Tijana Ajduković (197-C-91) of Hemofarm
