= 2005–06 First Women's Basketball League of Serbia and Montenegro =

- League: First League of Serbia and Montenegro
- Sport: Basketball
- Duration: 13 October 2005 – 2 June 2006
- Number of games: 148
- Number of teams: 11

2005–06
- Season champions: Hemofarm (6th title)

First League of Serbia and Montenegro seasons
- ← 2004–05

The 2005–06 First Women's Basketball League of Serbia and Montenegro is the 4th season of the First Women's Basketball League of Serbia and Montenegro, the highest professional basketball league in Serbia and Montenegro. It is also 62nd national championship played by Serbian clubs inclusive of nation's previous incarnations as Yugoslavia.

The first half of the season consists of 11 teams and 110-game regular season (20 games for each of the 11 teams) and in second half of the season 30-game in Super league and 8 in playoff.

== Regular season ==
The League of the season was played with 11 teams and play a dual circuit system, each with each one game at home and away. The six best teams at the end of the regular season were placed in the Super League. The regular season began on 13 October 2005 and it will end on 19 March 2006.

=== Standings ===
Place	Team	Pld	W	L	PF	PA	Diff	Pts	
1.	Hemofarm	20	19	1	1560	1156	+404	39	Super League
2.	Vojvodina NIS Naftagas	20	19	1	1691	1217	+474	39	Super League
3.	Jedinstvo Bijelo Polje	20	12	8	1449	1330	+119	32	Super League
4.	Crvena zvezda	20	12	8	1406	1331	+75	32	Super League
5.	Ušće	20	10	10	1600	1565	+35	30	Super League
6.	Partizan	20	10	10	1551	1578	-27	30	Super League
7.	Kovin	20	8	12	1419	1468	-49	28	
8.	Spartak Subotica	20	8	12	1270	1384	-114	28	
9.	Radnički NB	20	6	14	1338	1517	-179	26	
10.	Stara Pazova	20	3	17	1334	1616	-282	23	
11.	Student Niš	20	3	17	1082	1538	-456	23	

Qualified for Super League

== Super League ==
The Super League of the season was played with 6 teams and play a dual circuit system, each with each one game at home and away. The four best teams at the end of the regular Super League placed in the Play Off. The regular season began on 5 April 2006 and it will end on 10 May 2006.

Place	Team	Pld	W	L	PF	PA	Diff	Pts	
1.	Hemofarm	30	29	1	2340	1747	+593	59	Play Off
2.	Vojvodina NIS Naftagas	30	23	7	2460	1922	+538	53	Play Off
3.	Crvena zvezda	30	18	12	2111	2020	+91	48	Play Off
4.	Jedinstvo Bijelo Polje	30	17	13	2157	2086	+71	47	Play Off
5.	Ušće	30	13	17	2400	2424	-24	43	
6.	Partizan	30	12	18	2292	2481	-189	42	

Qualified for Play Off

== Play Off ==
Play Off is played according to the cup system. Champion is received after the final was played. In the semifinals was played on 2 wins, in the Final at 3 wins. Play Off is played from 15 May 2006. to 2 June 2006.

=== Bracket ===
Semifinals
1	Hemofarm	2
4	Jedinstvo Bijelo Polje	0
2	Vojvodina NIS Naftagas	2
3	Crvena zvezda	0

Final
1	Hemofarm	3
2	Vojvodina NIS Naftagas	1
