= Mina Maksimović =

Serbian basketball player

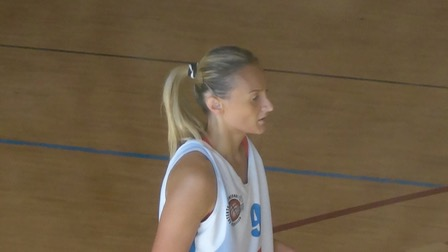

Personal information
- Born: 1 May 1983 (age 43) Kragujevac, SFR Yugoslavia
- Listed height: 1.90 m (6 ft 3 in)

Career information
- WNBA draft: 2005: undrafted
- Playing career: 2002–2017
- Position: Power forward / center

Career history
- 2002–2003: Kovin
- 2003–2005: Partizan
- 2005–2006: Szolnok
- 2007: Lulea Basket
- 2007–2008: Szekszárd
- 2008–2009: BSE
- 2009–2010: Voždovac
- 2010–2011: Burhaniye
- 2011–2012: Étoile de Voiron
- 2012: Reims Basket Féminin
- 2013–2015: Union Sportive La Glacerie
- 2015–2016: Le Chesnay-Versailles
- 2016–2017: Douvres Basket
Medals
Women's basketball
Representing Serbia
Universiade
Silver medal – second place	2005 İzmir	Team

Mina Maksimovic (born May 1, 1983) is a Serbian former professional basketball player. She was also selected to play for the Serbian national team. She was born in Kragujevac, Serbia.

== Education ==
- 2014 - 2018 University of Ottawa, Bachelor of Science.
- 2018 - 2021 University of Ottawa, Master of Science.
