= Miroslav Kanjevac =

Serbian basketball coach

Vršac
- Position: Head coach
- League: First Women's League of Serbia

Personal information
- Born: 18 December 1963 (age 62) Pančevo, SR Serbia, SFR Yugoslavia
- Coaching career: 1992–present

Career history

Coaching
- 1992: Profikolor
- 1992–1994: Profikolor (assistant)
- 1994–1995: Hemofarm (men's)
- 1995–1997: Profi D Pančevo
- 1997–2000: Partizan
- 2000–2001: Voždovac
- 2001–2002: Kovin (men's)
- 2002–2003: Kovin
- 2003–2004: Crvena zvezda (youth)
- 2004–2006: Radivoj Korać
- 2006–2007: Dinamo Pančevo
- 2007–2009: Tamiš
- 2009–2011: Crvena zvezda
- 2013–2014: Stara Pazova
- 2015–2016: Partizan 1953
- 2017–present: Vršac

Miroslav Kanjevac (Serbian Cyrillic: Мирослав Кањевац; born 18 December 1963) is a Serbian professional basketball coach.

== Coaching career ==
=== Men's basketball ===
Kanjevac coached Profikolor, Hemofarm and Kovin.

=== Women's basketball ===
Kanjevac coached Dinamo Pančevo, Partizan, Voždovac, Kovin, Radivoj Korać and Tamiš. In December 2009, he signed for Crvena zvezda.

In August 2015, Kanjevac became a head coach for the Partizan 1953. In December 2016, he resigned after one and a half year. In 2017, he signed for Vršac.

== Career achievements and awards ==
- FR Yugoslavia Women's League champion: 1 (with Profi D Pančevo: 1996–97)
- FR Yugoslavia Women's Cup winner: 1 (with Profi D Pančevo: 1996–97)
