= 2024–25 First Women's Basketball League of Serbia =

Women's basketball league in Serbia

First Women's Basketball League of Serbia
- Season: 2024–25
- Dates: Regular season: 28 September 2024 – 22 March 2025; Play Offs: 28 March – 23 April 2025
- Teams: 12

Regular season
- Season MVP: (Canada) Emily Potter

Finals
- Champions: Crvena zvezda Meridianbet (8th title)
- Runners-up: Kraljevo
- Finals MVP: (Canada) Emily Potter

Statistical leaders
Points	(Serbia) Jovana Popovic	21.2
Rebounds	(Serbia) Andjela Jekic	10.0
Assists	(Serbia) Tijana Cukic	6.3
Steals	(Serbia) Jovana Popovic	3.1
Blocks	(Serbia) Andjela Jekic	2.1

The 2024–25 First Women's Basketball League of Serbia is the 19th season of the top division women's basketball league in Serbia since its establishment in 2006. It starts in September 2024 with the first round of the regular season and ends in April 2025.

Crvena zvezda Meridianbet are the defending champions.

Crvena zvezda Meridianbet won their Eighth title after beating Kraljevo in the final.

== Format ==
Each team plays each other twice. The top four teams qualify for the play offs where the semifinals are played as a best of three series while the final is played as a best of five series.

== Regular season ==
Pos	Team	Pld	W	L	PF	PA	PD	Pts	Qualification
1	Crvena zvezda Meridianbet	22	22	0	2063	1221	+842	44	Play Offs
2	Kraljevo	22	19	3	1553	1354	+199	41	Play Offs
3	Mega Basket	22	15	7	1655	1276	+379	37	Play Offs
4	Student Niš	22	14	8	1626	1514	+112	36	Play Offs
5	Partizan 1953	22	12	10	1584	1484	+100	34	
6	Vojvodina 021	22	11	11	1426	1494	−68	33	
7	Ras	22	9	13	1343	1656	−313	31	
8	Duga	22	8	14	1485	1662	−177	30 (Note: Duga 142–137 Novosadska ŽKA)	
9	Novosadska ŽKA	22	8	14	1512	1597	−85	30	
10	Spartak Subotica	22	7	15	1449	1690	−241	29	
11	Proleter Zrenjanin	22	5	17	1355	1759	−404	27	Relegation
12	Sloga	22	2	20	1264	1608	−344	24	Relegation

Source: First Women's Basketball League of Serbia
Rules for classification: 1) Points; 2) Points difference; 3) Points scored.

== Play offs ==
Semifinals	Final
1	Crvena zvezda Meridianbet	93	91	2
4	Student Niš	70	82	0
1	Crvena zvezda Meridianbet	84	91	87	3
2	Kraljevo	53	57	64	0
2	Kraljevo	57	55	64	2
3	Mega Basket	54	72	62	1

Champions of Serbia

Crvena zvezda Meridianbet
Eighth title
