= Bojana Vulić =

Serbian basketball player

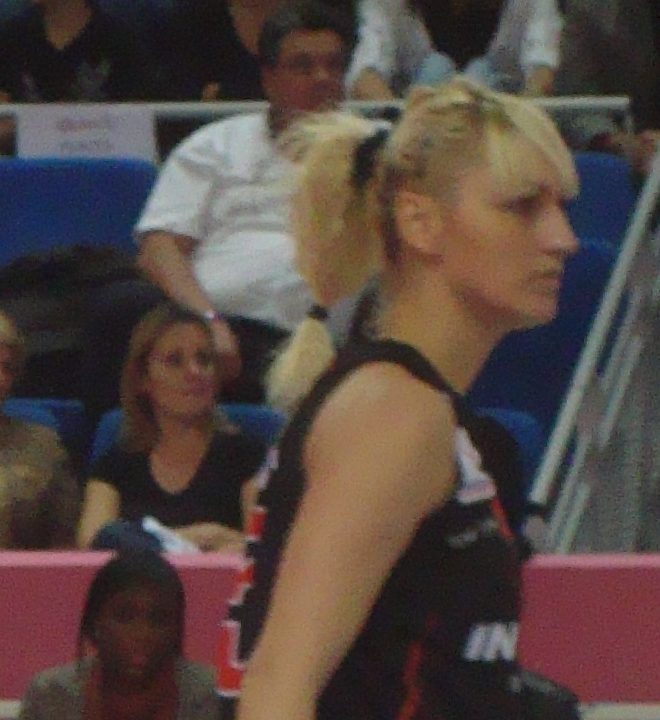

Personal information
- Born: May 28, 1984 (age 42) Belgrade, SFR Yugoslavia
- Listed height: 193 cm (6 ft 4 in)
- Listed weight: 80 kg (176 lb)

Career information
- WNBA draft: 2006: undrafted
- Playing career: 1995–2018
- Position: Power forward

Career history
- 1995–2001: Voždovac
- 2002–2003: Beopetrol
- 2003–2005: Crvena zvezda
- 2005–2006: Partizan
- 2006–2007: Merkur Celje
- 2007–2008: Edremit
- 2008: Spartak Subotica
- 2008: Burhaniye
- 2008–2009: Çankaya
- 2009–2010: Hatis Yerevan
- 2010: Radivoj Korać
- 2010–2011: ASPTT Charleville-Mézières
- 2011: Hatis Yerevan
- 2011–2012: Târgu Mureș
- 2012–2013: ESB Villeneuve-d'Ascq
- 2013: Rostov
- 2013–2014: Canik Belediyespor
- 2014: OrduSpor
- 2014: Budućnost Podgorica
- 2014: Play Off Sarajevo
- 2014: Sleza Wroclav
- 2015: UNI Győr
- 2015: Çankaya
- 2016: GSS Ramalah Palestina
- 2016: Student Niš
- 2017: Yalova Vip
- 2017–2018: Partizan

Bojana Vulić (Serbian Cyrillic: Бојана Вулић; born 28 May 1984) is a former Serbian professional basketball player and member of national team of Serbia.

== Professional career ==
Before basketball training and the karate she played folklore in KUD Boleč. In May 1995, Bojana started to train for basketball where her first steps started in Voždovac with coach Dragan Bojin. ŽKK Voždovac club won the state (Yugoslavia) and Republic (Serbia) championships. Bojana was declared the best player and shooter. She was a regular member of the national team of Yugoslavia (pioneers, cadets, juniors). With 15 years of senior debut for Voždovac and after two years spent in lower ranked competitions, she finally found her way to elite society, and at 16 years of age became the youngest captain in the first women's league. After seven years spent in the Voždovac, Bojana switched to another club.

"I trained in Voždovac seven years. There I learned everything I know, and it was really hard when I had to leave. This was a nice period of my life. But the club is in the difficult situation and not just a challenge to play in a team that is without ambition."

She desired to change the environment to fulfill the Beopetrol. In a half season 2001–02 became a member of the "blue-white" with the New Belgrade. With juniors Beopetrol the team won the championship Yugoslavia and Serbia and she was declared the best player and shooter. On the senior team she had great line results, the first game for Beopetrol she played against Partizan reaching 28 points (10–8), her game and the results showed that the move was a real transition for Bojana in the Beopetrol. Its results are not wane or senior selector women team of Yugoslavia to the call to prepare the team.

After two seasons played for Beopetrol, Bojana bid to get onto the team with a Crvena zvezda. In the 2003–04 season Bojana made appearances for Crvena zvezda, where the Zvezda and won in the Cup and Championship. Through all representative selections, she went to the university team in the 2003 Universiade in Daegu, South Korea. In the 2004–05 season Bojana remained at the Stars, where she became captain of Red Star, Star in the season went to the state championship finals where they lost to Hemofarm. During the finals in the playoffs and one of the games Bojana sustained a knee injury. These were the hardest days of her career. Due to knee injuries she missed the representative activities and competition. After a serious operation, and a lot of rehabilitation Bojana returned to the parquetry, and if no one believed to be so soon recover. On half season 2006 signed a contract with BC Partizan, the team that it was to meet during her recovery and return to the basketball court.

In the first game, with fear of spasms from the operation, Bojana played almost whole game without mistakes. No one believed how she played. After the half season she bid to get into BC Mercury in Celje, the most dominant club in the Slovenian women's professional league. In Celje the reserves a year where the BC Mercury won the Cup in Slovenia in the ABA League (Adriatic League) came to final four. From Celje and Slovenia leaving and following season 2007–08 played in Turkey, signed contract with "BC Erdemit", on half season 2007–08 to exceed the "BC Buranije" of the year spent in İzmir clubs made the good results was among the first ten players in Turkey league. In 2008–09 she transitioned in Çankaya University from Ankara where she became the main player of the club, ending the season with fantastic results.
