= Lidija Vučković =

Serbian basketball player

Mileševka
- Position: Shooting guard
- League: Second League of Serbia

Personal information
- Born: 10 February 1988 (age 38) Belgrade, SFR Yugoslavia
- Listed height: 1.71 m (5 ft 7 in)

Career information
- WNBA draft: 2010: undrafted
- Playing career: 2005–present

Career history
- 2005—2008: Ušće
- 2008—2010: Hemofarm
- 2010—2015: Partizan
- 2015—2017: Radivoj Korać
- 2017—2018: Partizan
- 2019—: Mileševka

Lidija Vučković (Serbian Cyrillic: Лидија Вучковић; born 10 February 1988) is a Serbian professional basketball player.

== Club career ==
With Hemofarm she won 1 national Championships (2008–09) and 2 national cup (2008–09, 2009–10), with Partizan she won 3 national Championships (2010–11, 2011–12, 2012–13), 3 national cup (2010–11, 2012–13, 2017–18) and 2 Adriatic League Women (2011–12, 2012–13), and the Radivoj Korać she won 1 national Championships (2015–16)

== Honours ==
Hemofarm

- National Championship of Serbia (1): 2008–09
- National Cup of Serbia (2): 2008–09, 2009–10

Partizan

- National Championship of Serbia (3): 2010–11, 2011–12, 2012–13
- National Cup of Serbia (3): 2010–11, 2012–13, 2017–18
- Adriatic League Women (2): 2011–12, 2012–13

Radivoj Korać

- National Championship of Serbia (1): 2015–16
