= Serbia and Montenegro Women's Basketball Cup =

Basketball tournament in Serbia and Montenegro

- Sport: Basketball
- Founded: 1992
- Folded: 2006
- No. of teams: 8
- Country: (Federal Republic of Yugoslavia) FR Yugoslavia (1992–2003); Serbia and Montenegro (2003–2006)
- Continent: FIBA Europe (Europe)
- Last champion: Hemofarm (6th title)
- Most titles: Hemofarm (6 titles)
- Broadcasters: RTS; SOS Channel

The Serbia and Montenegro Women's Basketball Cup (Serbian Cyrillic: Куп Србије и Црне Горе у кошарци за жене), formerly Yugoslav Women's Basketball Cup (Serbian Cyrillic: Куп СР Југославије у кошарци за жене), was the women's national basketball cup of Serbia and Montenegro (formerly FR Yugoslavia) between 1992 and 2006. It was run by the Basketball Federation of Serbia and Montenegro.

== Title holders ==
- 1992–93 Student Niš (Viner Broker Niš)
- 1993–94 Crvena zvezda
- 1994–95 Crvena zvezda
- 1995–96 Vršac (Hemofarm)
- 1996–97 Dinamo Pančevo (Profi D Pančevo)
- 1997–98 Vršac (Hemofarm)
- 1998–99 Vršac (Hemofarm)
- 1999–00 Kovin
- 2000–01 Vojvodina
- 2001–02 Vršac (Hemofarm)
- 2002–03 Crvena zvezda
- 2003–04 Crvena zvezda
- 2004–05 Vršac (Hemofarm)
- 2005–06 Vršac (Hemofarm)

== Finals ==
Season	Host	Winner	Result	Runner-up	Winner's Coach	Ref.
1992–93	Vršac	Viner Broker Niš	72–65	Crvena zvezda		
1993–94	Svilajnac	Crvena zvezda	79–76	Viner Broker Niš	(Serbia and Montenegro) Zoran Kovačić	
1994–95	Vrbas	Crvena zvezda	84–78	Vojvodina	(Serbia and Montenegro) Dragomir Bukvić	
1995–96	Vršac	Hemofarm	70–58	Partizan		
1996–97	Bačka Palanka	Profi D Pančevo	68–66	Bačka Palanka	(Serbia and Montenegro) Miroslav Kanjevac	
1997–98	Vršac	Hemofarm	81–68	Vojvodina		
1998–99	Novi Sad	Hemofarm	84–77	Vojvodina	(Federal Republic of Yugoslavia) Miodrag Vesković	
1999–00	Kovin	Kovin	54–51	Partizan	(Serbia and Montenegro) Zoran Kovačić	
2000–01	Novi Sad	Vojvodina	86–81	Crvena zvezda	(Federal Republic of Yugoslavia) Radojica Nikčević	
2001–02	Novi Sad	Hemofarm	75–70	Budućnost Podgorica	(Serbia and Montenegro) Miroslav Popov	
2002–03	Belgrade	Crvena zvezda	83–77	Budućnost Podgorica	(Serbia and Montenegro) Vladislav Lučić	
2003–04	Novi Sad	Crvena zvezda	69–59	Hemofarm	(Serbia and Montenegro) Vladislav Lučić	
2004–05	Bijelo Polje	Hemofarm	81–64	Vojvodina	(Serbia and Montenegro) Miroslav Popov	
2005–06	Novi Sad	Hemofarm	79–74	Vojvodina	(Serbia and Montenegro) Jovica Antonić	

=== Performance by club ===
Team	Winners	Runners-up	Years Won	Years Runner-up
Hemofarm	6	1	1996, 1998, 1999, 2002, 2005, 2006	2004
Crvena zvezda	4	2	1994, 1995, 2003, 2004	1993, 2001
Vojvodina	1	5	2001	1995, 1998, 1999, 2005, 2006
Viner Broker Niš	1	1	1993	1994
Profi D Pančevo	1	–	1997	–
Kovin	1	–	2000	–
Partizan	–	2	–	1996, 2000
Budućnost Podgorica	–	2	–	2002, 2003
Bačka Palanka	–	1	–	1997

== Aftermath ==
- Milan Ciga Vasojević Cup
- Montenegrin Women's Basketball Cup

== See also ==
- First Women's Basketball League of Serbia and Montenegro
