= Jelena Antić =

Macedonian basketball player

No. 8 – Wisła Can-Pack Kraków
- Position: Small forward
- League: Basket Liga Kobiet; EuroLeague Women

Personal information
- Born: 17 June 1991 (age 35) Skopje, SR Macedonia, SFR Yugoslavia
- Listed height: 187 cm (6 ft 2 in)

Career information
- High school: Liberty Christian Academy (2008–2009)
- College: Liberty Flames (2009–2011)
- WNBA draft: 2013: undrafted

Career history
- –2006: Vardar Mladinec
- 2011–2014: Partizan
- 2014: Radivoj Korać
- 2014–2015: Maccabi Ashdod
- 2015: Mann-Filter
- 2015–2016: CSU Alba Iulia
- 2016–2017: Luleå Basket
- 2017–2018: Wisła Can-Pack Kraków
- 2018–present: Le Mura Lucca

Career highlights
- 3x Serbian League champion (2012—2014); 3x Serbian Cup winner (2012—2014); 3x Adriatic League Women champion (2012—2014)

Jelena Antić (Macedonian: Јелена Антиќ, born 17 June 1991) is a Macedonian professional basketball player. She played for Namur Capitale, Ludovika-FCSM Csata, Wisła Can-Pack Kraków, Luleå Basket, Alba Iulia, Maccabi Ashdod, Zkk Partizan, Vardar Mladinec, Liberty Flames Partizan, Radivoj Korać.
