= Alicia Gladden =

American basketball player

Personal information
- Born: May 28, 1985 Orange Park, Florida, U.S.
- Died: April 19, 2013 (aged 27) Avondale, Florida, U.S.
- Listed height: 1.78 m (5 ft 10 in)

Career information
- High school: Orange Park (Orange Park, Florida)
- College: Florida State (2003–2007)
- WNBA draft: 2007: undrafted
- Playing career: 2007–2012
- Position: Shooting guard

Career history
- 2007–2008: ICIM Arad
- 2008: Basket Esch
- 2008–2010: Energa Toruń
- 2011–2012: Partizan

Career highlights
- ACC All-Defensive Team (2005–2007)

Alicia Gladden (May 28, 1985 – April 19, 2013) was an American women's basketball player. As a member of ŽKK Partizan, she won the Women's Adriatic League and national championships in 2012. Gladden also played in the EuroCup Women for Partizan as well as for the Polish side Energa Toruń and the Romanian club ICIM Arad.

== Florida State statistics ==
Legend
GP	Games played	GS	Games started	MPG	Minutes per game
FG%	Field goal percentage	3P%	3-point field goal percentage	FT%	Free throw percentage
RPG	Rebounds per game	APG	Assists per game	SPG	Steals per game
BPG	Blocks per game	PPG	Points per game	**Bold**	Career high

Year	Team	GP	Points	FG%	3P%	FT%	RPG	APG	SPG	BPG	PPG
2003-04	Florida State	30	156	46.4	-	51.9	3.2	1.6	1.3	0.2	5.2
2004-05	Florida State	32	397	**52.2**	-	**75.0**	**6.6**	2.1	**3.2**	**0.7**	12.4
2005-06	Florida State	30	392	46.6	20.0	68.8	6.4	1.8	2.1	0.6	13.1
2006-07	Florida State	**34**	**458**	44.8	**37.0**	71.5	5.9	**2.4**	2.1	**0.7**	**13.5**
Career		126	1403	47.4	28.3	69.3	5.6	2.0	2.2	0.6	11.1

== Death ==
Gladden died in a car accident on April 19, 2013.
