= Maja Milutinović =

Montenegrin basketball player

Personal information
- Born: 2 October 1987 (age 39) Podgorica, SFR Yugoslavia
- Listed height: 1.76 m (5 ft 9 in)

Career information
- WNBA draft: 2009: undrafted
- Playing career: –2012
- Position: Shooting guard

Career history
- 2009–2010: Hemofarm
- 2010–2011: Voždovac
- 2011: Budućnost Podgorica
- 2012: Mladi Krajišnik
Medals
Women's basketball
Representing Serbia and Montenegro
European U18 Championship
Gold medal – first place	2005 Hungary	Team
European U16 Championship
Gold medal – first place	2003 Turkey	Team

Maja Milutinović (Serbian: Маја Милутиновић; born 2 October 1987) is a former Montenegrin basketball player.
