= Cvetana Dekleva =

Yugoslav and Slovenian basketball player

Personal information
- Born: April 24, 1963 (age 63) Subotica, SR Serbia, SFR Yugoslavia
- Listed height: 1.79 m (5 ft 10 in)
- Listed weight: 63 kg (139 lb)

Career information
- Playing career: 1978–1985

Career history
- 1978–1980: Spartak
- 1980–1985: Partizan

Cvetana Dekleva (born April 24, 1963) is a Yugoslav and Slovenian former female basketball player.
