= Jovica Antonić =

Serbian basketball coach

Crvena zvezda Meridianbet
- Title: Youth System Coordinator

Personal information
- Born: 13 July 1966 (age 60) Belgrade, SR Serbia, SFR Yugoslavia
- Listed height: 1.90 m (6 ft 3 in)

Career information
- NBA draft: 1988: undrafted
- Playing career: 1982–1990
- Position: Point guard
- Number: 5
- Coaching career: 1990–present

Career history

Playing
- 1982–1983: Partizan
- Jagodina
- Poliester Priboj
- 1988–1990: Mladost Zemun

Coaching
- 1990–1994: Mladost Zemun
- 1994–1995: Radnički Belgrade
- 1996–1997: Zemun
- 1997–1998: Sloga (advisor)
- 1998: Crvena zvezda Youth
- 1998–1999: Crvena zvezda
- 2000–2001: Igokea
- 2002: Spartak Subotica
- 2003: OKK Beograd
- 2004: Crvena zvezda Ladies
- 2005: Lavovi 063
- 2005–2007: Hemofarm Ladies
- 2009–2010: Ergonom
- 2010–2011: Jagodina
- 2011–2012: Konstantin

Career highlights
- Bosnian League champion (2001); 2× Serbian Women's League champion (2006, 2007)
Medals
Women's Basketball
Head coach for Serbia
Europe U20 Championship
Silver medal – second place	2007 Bulgaria	Team
Bronze medal – third place	2008 Italy	Team
Men's basketball
Assistant coach for Serbia
Summer Olympic Games
Silver medal – second place	2016 Rio de Janeiro	Team
FIBA World Cup
Silver medal – second place	2014 Spain	Team
EuroBasket
Silver medal – second place	2017 Turkey	Team

Jovica Antonić (Serbian Cyrillic: Јовица Антонић, born 13 July 1966) is a Serbian professional basketball coach and former player who is the youth system coordinator for the Crvena zvezda youth system.

== Playing career ==
A point guard, Antonić played in Yugoslavia from 1982 to 1990. During his playing days, he played for Partizan (3 games during the 1982–83 season), Jagodina, KK Poliester Priboj and Mladost Zemun. He retired as a player with Mladost in 1990 due to serious injury.

== Coaching career ==
=== Men's basketball ===
In 1991, Antonić began his coaching career in Mladost Zemun. After that, he moved to Radnički Belgrade. In November 1998, Antonić was named the coach of Crvena zvezda for the rest of the 1998–99 season. Crvena zvezda parted ways with him on 10 October 1999. The club sat well in the domestic league, but fared poorly in the EuroLeague 1999–2000 season. Antonić had a stint as a head coach of Igokea during the 2000–01 season when he won the Championship of Bosnia and Herzegovina. Also, he coached Spartak Subotica, OKK Beograd, Lavovi 063, Ergonom, and Jagodina.

Antonić served as a head coach for Konstantin during the 2011–12 season. After the season he resign due to health issues.

=== Women's basketball ===
Antonić was a head coach of Hemofarm from Vršac where he won the Serbian Basketball League and the Milan Ciga Vasojević Cup in the 2006–07 season. Also, he coached Crvena zvezda in 2004.

== National teams coaching career ==
=== Women's basketball ===
Antonić was a head coach of the Serbia national team and led the ladies at the 2007 EuroBasket Women in Italy and the 2009 EuroBasket Women in Latvia.

Also, Antonić has coached the Serbia Under-20 national team that won the silver medal at the 2007 European Championship for Women in Bulgaria and the bronze medal at the 2008 European Championship for Women in Italy.

=== Serbia men's national team ===
From 2013 to 2019, Antonić was an assistant coach of Aleksandar Đorđević in the Serbia national team, with whom he won three silver medals; the 2014 FIBA Basketball World Cup in Spain, the 2016 Summer Olympics in Rio de Janeiro, and the EuroBasket 2017. In January 2020, coach Igor Kokoškov announced that Antonić is an assistant coach in Serbia's new coaching staff. In September 2021, Antonić left the National team as the assistant coach after eight years.

== Executive career ==
Antonić served as a sporting director for Konstantin between 1 January 2020 and August 2022.

On 17 August 2022, Crvena zvezda hired Antonić as their new youth system coordinator for the under-19 and under-16 teams.

== Career achievements ==
- Bosnian League champion: 1 (with Igokea: 2000–01)
- R Srpska First League champion: 1 (with Igokea: 2000–01)
- R Srpska Cup winner: 1 (with Igokea: 2000–01)
- Women's League of Serbia and Montenegro champion: 1 (with Hemofarm: 2005–06)
- Serbian Women's League champion: 1 (with Hemofarm: 2006–07)
- Serbia and Montenegro Women's Cup winner: 1 (with Hemofarm: 2005–06)
- Milan Ciga Vasojević Cup winner: 1 (with Hemofarm: 2006–07)

== See also ==
- List of KK Crvena zvezda head coaches
