= Marina Marković =

Serbian basketball player

No. 15 – G.S. Keltern
- Position: Small forward
- League: Bundesliga

Personal information
- Born: November 19, 1991 (age 34) Belgrade, FR Yugoslavia
- Listed height: 1.85 m (6 ft 1 in)

Career information
- WNBA draft: 2013: undrafted

Career history
- Hemofarm
- 2006–2011: Kovin
- 2011–2012: Radivoj Korać
- 2012–2013: Mladi Krajišnik
- 2013–2014: Šumadija Kragujevac
- 2014–2015: Lyon
- 2015: Gernika
- 2015–2016: Talleres
- 2016–present: G.S. Keltern

Marina Marković Марина Марковић (born 19 November 1991) is a Serbian basketball player for Talleres and the Serbian national team, where she participated at the 2014 FIBA World Championship.

== Personal life ==
Her father is Petar Marković, a basketball coach.
