= Saša Čađo =

Serbian basketball player

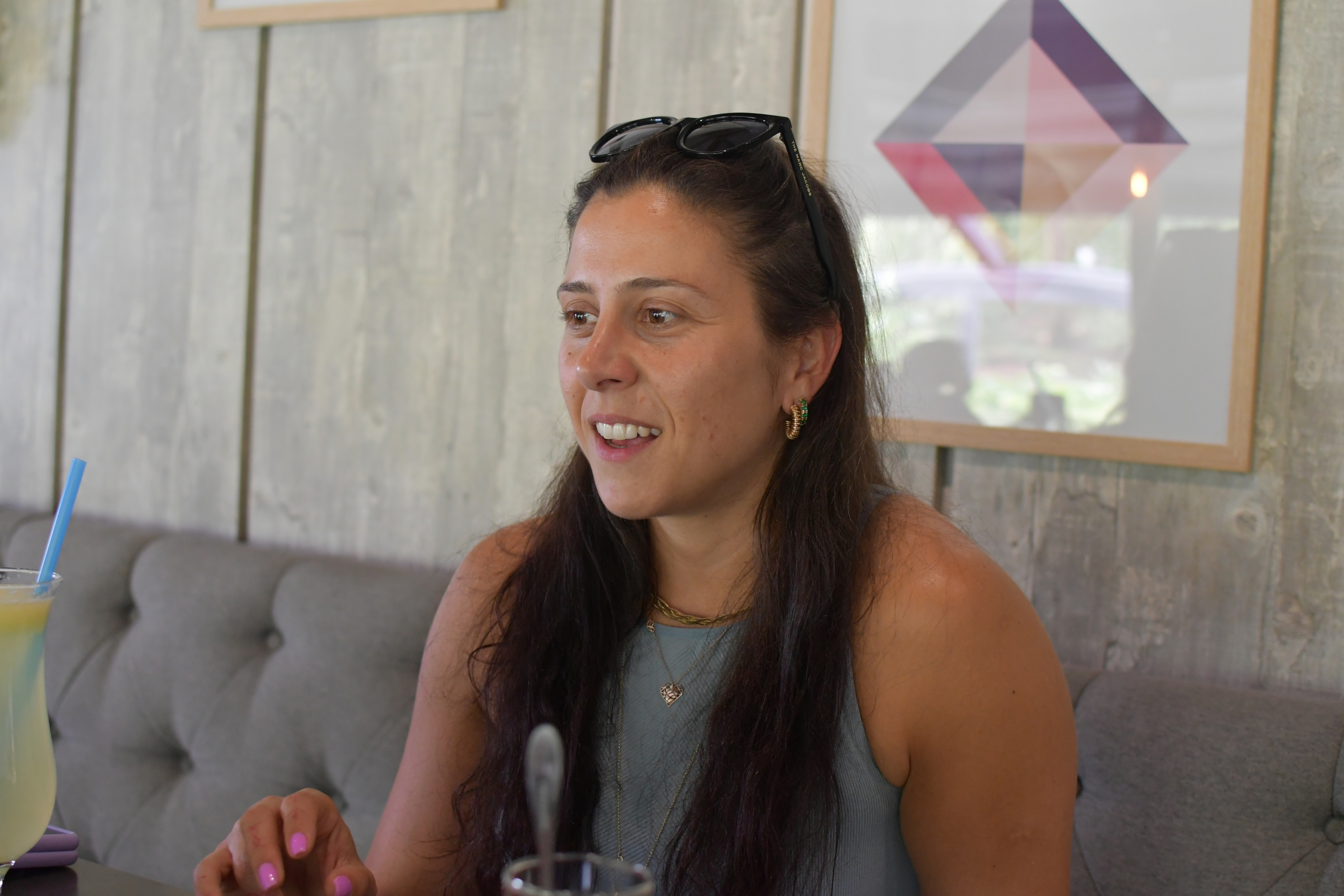
- Čađo in 2022

Mersin BŞB
- Position: Guard
- League: TKBL

Personal information
- Born: 13 July 1989 (age 37) Sarajevo, SR Bosnia-Herzegovina, SFR Yugoslavia
- Listed height: 5 ft 10 in (1.78 m)

Career information
- WNBA draft: 2011: undrafted
- Playing career: 2006–present

Career history
- 2006–2007: Mladi Krajišnik
- 2007–2009: Željezničar Sarajevo
- 2009–2012: Hemofarm
- 2012–2013: Partizan
- 2013–2014: CSU Alba Iulia
- 2014–2015: Canik Belediye
- 2015–2017: İstanbul Üniversitesi SK
- 2017–present: Mersin BŞB

Career highlights
- 3x Serbian Cup winner (2010, 2012, 2013); Serbian League champion (2013); Adriatic League champion (2013)
Medals
Women's basketball
Representing Serbia
Olympic Games
Bronze medal – third place	2016 Rio de Janeiro	Team
EuroBasket
Gold medal – first place	2015 Hungary/Romania
Gold medal – first place	2021 France/Spain
Bronze medal – third place	2019 Latvia/Serbia

Saša Čađo (Serbian Cyrillic: Саша Чађо, born 13 July 1989) is a Serbian professional women's basketball player who plays for İstanbul Üniversitesi SK of the Turkish League. She also represents the Serbian national basketball team.

== International career ==
She represented Serbian national basketball team at the EuroBasket 2015 in Budapest where they won the gold medal, and qualified for the 2016 Olympics, first in the history for the Serbian team.

== Orders ==
- Medal of Merit to the People (Republika Srpska)
