= Zoran Kovačić =

Serbian former professional basketball coach

Crvena zvezda
- Position: Team manager

Personal information
- Born: 13 October 1948 (age 78) Šabac, PR Serbia, FPR Yugoslavia
- Coaching career: 1967–2013

Career history

Coaching
- 1967–1972: Karaburma (men's team)
- 1972–1981: Crvena zvezda (youth, assistant)
- 1981–1988: Crvena zvezda
- 1988–1990: Crvena zvezda (assistant)
- 1990–1993: Crvena zvezda
- 1993–1994: Levski Sofia
- 1999–2000: Kovin
- 2002–2003: Budućnost Podgorica
- 2004–2006: Serbia and Montenegro U-16
- 2005: Serbia and Montenegro
- 2007–2013: Serbia U-18 & U-19
- 2012–2013: Crvena zvezda

Career highlights
- Yugoslav Women's League champion (1992); 2× Serbia and Montenegro League champion (1993, 2003)
Medals
Women's Basketball
Head coach for Serbia and Montenegro and Serbia
FIBA Under-19 World Cup
Bronze medal – third place	2007 Slovakia	Team
Europe Under-18 Championship
Gold medal – first place	2007 Serbia	Team
Bronze medal – third place	2013 Croatia	Team
Bronze medal – third place	2012 Romania	Team
Europe Under-16 Championship
Silver medal – second place	2004 Italy	Team

Zoran "Čivija" Kovačić (Serbian Cyrillic: Зоран Ковачић - Чивија, born October 13, 1948) is a Serbian former professional basketball coach. He is considering for one of the best coaches for women's basketball in Serbia.

== Coaching career ==
Kovačić began his coaching career in men's basketball in 1967 in Karaburma. After five years he moved to the women's team of Crvena zvezda. In 1990, he became head coach of their first team. Later he became coach of the Kovin, Levski Sofia and the Budućnost Podgorica. In 2002, he took care of the young teams of the Serbia and Montenegro national team, as well as, young teams of the Serbia.

Kovačić won twelve Yugoslav Women's Championship for Juniors and seven Yugoslav Women's Championship for Cadets with Crvena zvezda youth selections. He won the Yugoslav Women's Coach of the Year award eight times.

== National team coaching career ==
Kovačić also coached the Serbia and Montenegro women's national team at 2005 European Women's Basketball Championship in Turkey. He was a coach of Serbia and Montenegro youth national teams from 2002 to 2006, and later of Serbia until 2013.

== Career achievements and awards ==
=== Titles ===
- Yugoslav League champion: 1 (with Crvena zvezda: 1991–92)
- Yugoslav Women's Basketball Cup champion: 1 (with Crvena zvezda: 1991–92)
- Serbia and Montenegro League champion: 2 (with Crvena zvezda: 1992–93; with Budućnost Podgorica: 2002–03)
- Serbia and Montenegro Cup winner : 2 (with Crvena zvezda: 1993–94; with Kovin: 1999–00)

=== Individual ===
- Slobodan Piva Ivković Award for Lifetime Achievement — 2022
- Coach of the year in Serbia — 1979, 1981, 1985
- Coach of the year in Yugoslavia – 1992, 1993, 1995, 2000
- The Charter of SD Crvena Zvezda
- The Golden Badge of SD Crvena Zvezda
- The Golden Plaque of SD Crvena Zvezda
