= Miroslav Popov (basketball) =

Serbian coach in the Women's Chinese Basketball Association

Tianjin Ronggang
- Position: Head coach
- League: WCBA

Personal information
- Born: 26 November 1957 (age 68) Vršac, PR Serbia, FPR Yugoslavia
- Coaching career: 1982–present

Career history

Coaching
- 1993–1994: Hemofarm Men
- 1993–1999: Hemofarm Women (assistant)
- 1999–2003: Hemofarm Women
- 2003–2004: Lions Vršac
- 2004–2005: Hemofarm Women
- 2005–2007: Mercede Basket Alghero
- 2007–2008: Leotar
- 2008–2009: Swisslion Vršac (assistant)
- 2010–2013: Hemofarm Women
- 2013–2017: CSU Alba Iulia
- 2019–present: Tianjin Ronggang

Miroslav Popov (Serbian Cyrillic: Миодраг Попов; born November 26, 1957) is a Serbian professional basketball coach for Tianjin Ronggang of the Women's Chinese Basketball Association (WCBA).

== Coaching career ==
=== Men's basketball ===
Popov coached Lions Vršac in the 2003–04 season and Bosnian team Leotar Trebinje during 2007–08 season.

=== Women's club basketball ===
Popov spent a big part of his coaching career with Hemofarm from Vršac. He was an assistant coach from 1993 to 1999, and a head coach three times: 1999–2003, 2004–2005 and 2010–2013.

Also, Popov coached teams in Italy and Romania. He was a coach of Italian team Mercede Basket Alghero for two seasons. In Romania, he was a head coach for CSU Alba Iulia for five seasons.

During the 2019–20 season Popov coached Tianjin Ronggang of the Women's Chinese Basketball Association.

=== Women national teams ===
FR Yugoslavia

Popov was a head coach for the FR Yugoslavia women's national team at the EuroBasket Women 2001 and 2002 FIBA World Championship for Women.

Romania

Popov was a head coach for the Romania women's national team.

== Career achievements and awards ==
Head Coach

- Central Europe Women's League champion: 2 (with CSU Alba Iulia: 2013–14, 2015–16)
- FR Yugoslavia/Serbia and Montenegro Women's League champion: 3 (with Hemofarm: 1999–00, 2000–01, 2004–05)
- Milan Ciga Vasojević Cup winner: 2 (with Hemofarm: 2009–10, 2011–12)
- FR Yugoslavia/Serbia and Montenegro Women's Cup winner: 2 (with Hemofarm: 2001–02, 2004–05)

Assistant Coach

- FR Yugoslavia Women's League champion: 2 (with Hemofarm: 1997–98, 1998–99)
- FR Yugoslavia Women's Cup: 3 (with Hemofarm: 1995–96, 1997–98, 1998–99)
