= Nevena Jovanović =

Serbian basketball player (born 1990)

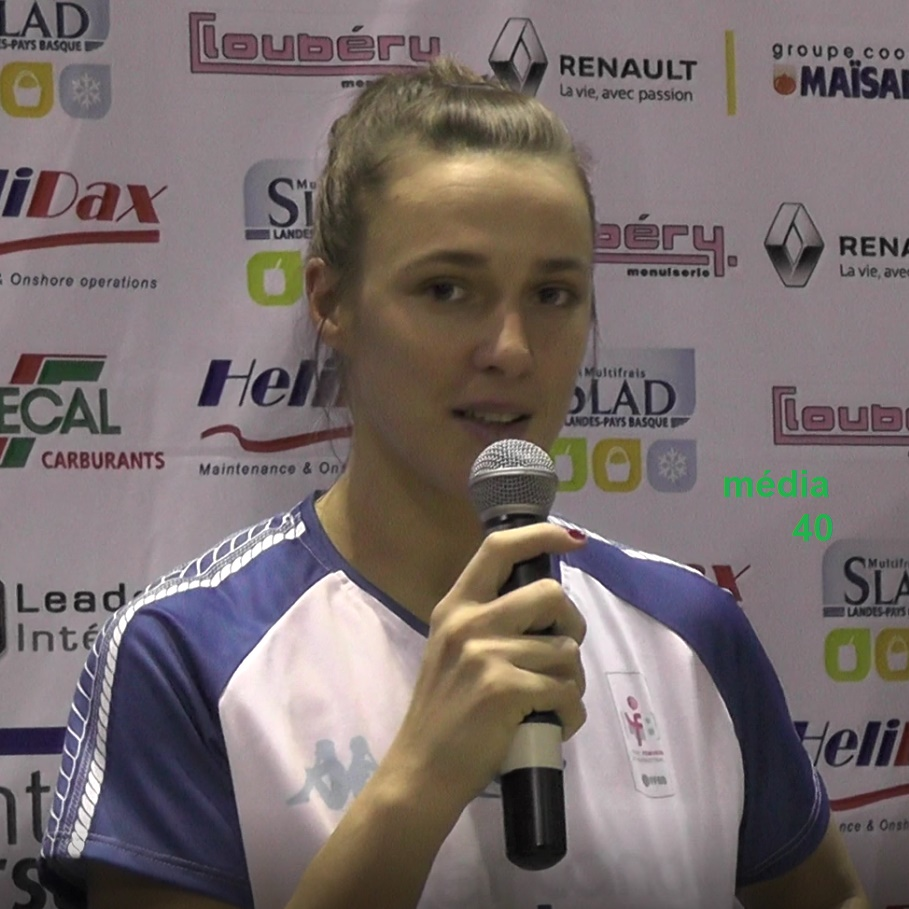

No. 8 – Basket Landes
- Position: Shooting guard
- League: LFB; EuroCup

Personal information
- Born: 30 June 1990 (age 36) Kraljevo, SR Serbia, SFR Yugoslavia
- Listed height: 5 ft 11 in (1.80 m)

Career information
- WNBA draft: 2012: undrafted
- Playing career: 2006–present

Career history
- 2006–2008: Kraljevo
- 2008–2010: Kovin
- 2010–2012: Radivoj Korać
- 2012–2013: Partizan
- 2013–2015: PEAC-Pécs
- 2015–2016: Edirne
- 2016: Yakın Doğu Üniversitesi
- 2016–2017: Basket Landes
- 2017–2018: ESB Villeneuve-d'Ascq
- 2018–2019: KSC Szekszárd
- 2019–2020: Ślęza Wrocław
- 2020–2021: Basket Landes
- 2021–2022: Sopron Basket
- 2022–: Nika Syktyvkar
Medals
Women's basketball
Representing Serbia
Olympic Games
Bronze medal – third place	2016 Rio de Janeiro	Team
EuroBasket
Gold medal – first place	2015 Hungary/Romania
Gold medal – first place	2021 France/Spain
Bronze medal – third place	2019 Latvia/Serbia
Mediterranean Games
Silver medal – second place	2009 Pescara	Team
European U18 Championship
Gold medal – first place	2007 Serbia	Team

Nevena Jovanović (Serbian Cyrillic: Невена Јовановић, born 30 Junе 1990) is a Serbian professional women's basketball player who plays for Basket Landes of the Ligue Féminine. She also represents the Serbian national basketball team.

While playing with Partizan, she won Serbian League championship in 2013, national cup in 2013 and Adriatic League Women championship in 2013.

== International career ==
She represented Serbian national basketball team at the EuroBasket 2015 in Budapest where they won the gold medal, and qualified for the 2016 Olympics, first in the history for the Serbian team.
