= Carl Thomas (basketball) =

American basketball player and coach (born 1969)

Cleary Cougars
- Title: Head coach
- League: Wolverine–Hoosier Athletic Conference

Personal information
- Born: October 3, 1969 (age 57) Dayton, Ohio, U.S.
- Listed height: 6 ft 4 in (1.93 m)
- Listed weight: 215 lb (98 kg)

Career information
- High school: Everett (Lansing, Michigan)
- College: Eastern Michigan (1987–1991)
- NBA draft: 1991: undrafted
- Playing career: 1991–2003
- Position: Shooting guard
- Number: 21, 23, 30

Career history

Playing
- 1991: Sacramento Kings
- 1991–1992: Fort Wayne Fury
- 1992–1994: Grand Rapids Hoops
- 1994–1995: Grand Rapids Mackers
- 1995: Jersey Turnpikes
- 1995: Baloncesto Salamanca
- 1995–1996: Grand Rapids Mackers
- 1996: Fort Wayne Fury
- 1996–1997: Cleveland Cavaliers
- 1997: Golden State Warriors
- 1998: Orlando Magic
- 1998: Golden State Warriors
- 1998: Cleveland Cavaliers
- 1998–2000: Fort Wayne Fury
- 2000: Limoges
- 2000–2001: BC Luleå
- 2001: San Pedro de Macorís
- 2001–2002: Iraklio B.C.
- 2002–2003: Ionikos NF
- 2003: Sicc Jesi

Coaching
- 2004–2005: Maryland Eastern Shore (assistant)
- 2005–2011: Eastern Michigan (assistant)
- 2011–2013: Owens CC (assistant)
- 2013–2017: Jackson
- 2017–2022: Duquesne (assistant)
- 2022–present: Cleary

Career highlights
- All-CBA Second Team (1996); Second-team All-MAC (1991)
- Stats at NBA.com
- Stats at Basketball Reference
Medals
Men's basketball
Representing United States
Pan American Games
Silver medal – second place	1995 Mar del Plata	Team competition
Silver medal – second place	1999 Winnipeg	Team competition

Carl Thomas (born October 3, 1969) is an American former professional basketball player who played in the National Basketball Association (NBA). He is currently the head coach at Cleary University.

Though born in Dayton, Ohio, Thomas moved to Lansing, Michigan where he played basketball at Everett High School. He went on to college at Eastern Michigan University, where he also played basketball.

Thomas began his NBA career with the Sacramento Kings in 1991–92, playing one game, playing 31 minutes, scoring 12 points. He did not return to the league until 1996–97, when he joined the Cleveland Cavaliers. His final NBA season in 1997–98 was split between the Golden State Warriors, Orlando Magic, and the Cavaliers (for a second stint).

Thomas played in the Continental Basketball Association (CBA) for the Fort Wayne Fury, Grand Rapids Hoops and Grand Rapids Mackers from 1991 to 2000. He was selected to the All-CBA Second Team in 1996.

Thomas last played professionally with an Italian team, Fileni Jesi. He is the twin brother of former Detroit Pistons player Charles Thomas.

Thomas took a position as head of the Jackson College basketball program in 2013. He previously worked as an assistant basketball coach at Eastern Michigan University.

On August 23, 2022, Thomas was named the first head coach of the Cleary University men's basketball program.

== See also ==
- List of NCAA Division I men's basketball players with 11 or more steals in a game
