= Mirjana Beronja =

Serbian women's basketball player

No. 11 – ŠBK Šamorín
- Position: Point guard
- League: Slovak Extraliga

Personal information
- Born: 12 July 1986 (age 40) Sremska Mitrovica, SFR Yugoslavia
- Listed height: 1.70 m (5 ft 7 in)

Career information
- WNBA draft: 2008: undrafted
- Playing career: 2003–present

Career history
- 2003–2007: Stara Pazova
- 2007–2012: Partizan
- 2012–2013: Radivoj Korać
- 2013–2014: Crvena zvezda
- 2014–2015: Udominate Basket
- 2015–2016: BLK Slavia Praha
- 2016–present: ŠBK Šamorín

Mirjana Beronja (Serbian Cyrillic: Мирјана Бероња; born 12 July 1986) is a Serbian women's basketball player.

With Partizan she won three national championships (2009/10, 2010/11, 2011/12), one national cups (2010/11) and one Adriatic Women's League (2011/12). She has also played for Radivoj Korać (2012-2013), Crvena zveda (2013-2014), Udominate Basket (2014-2015), BLK Slavia Praha (2015-2016), ŠBK Šamorín, and Marratxi.
