= Everett High School (Michigan) =

High school in Lansing, Michigan

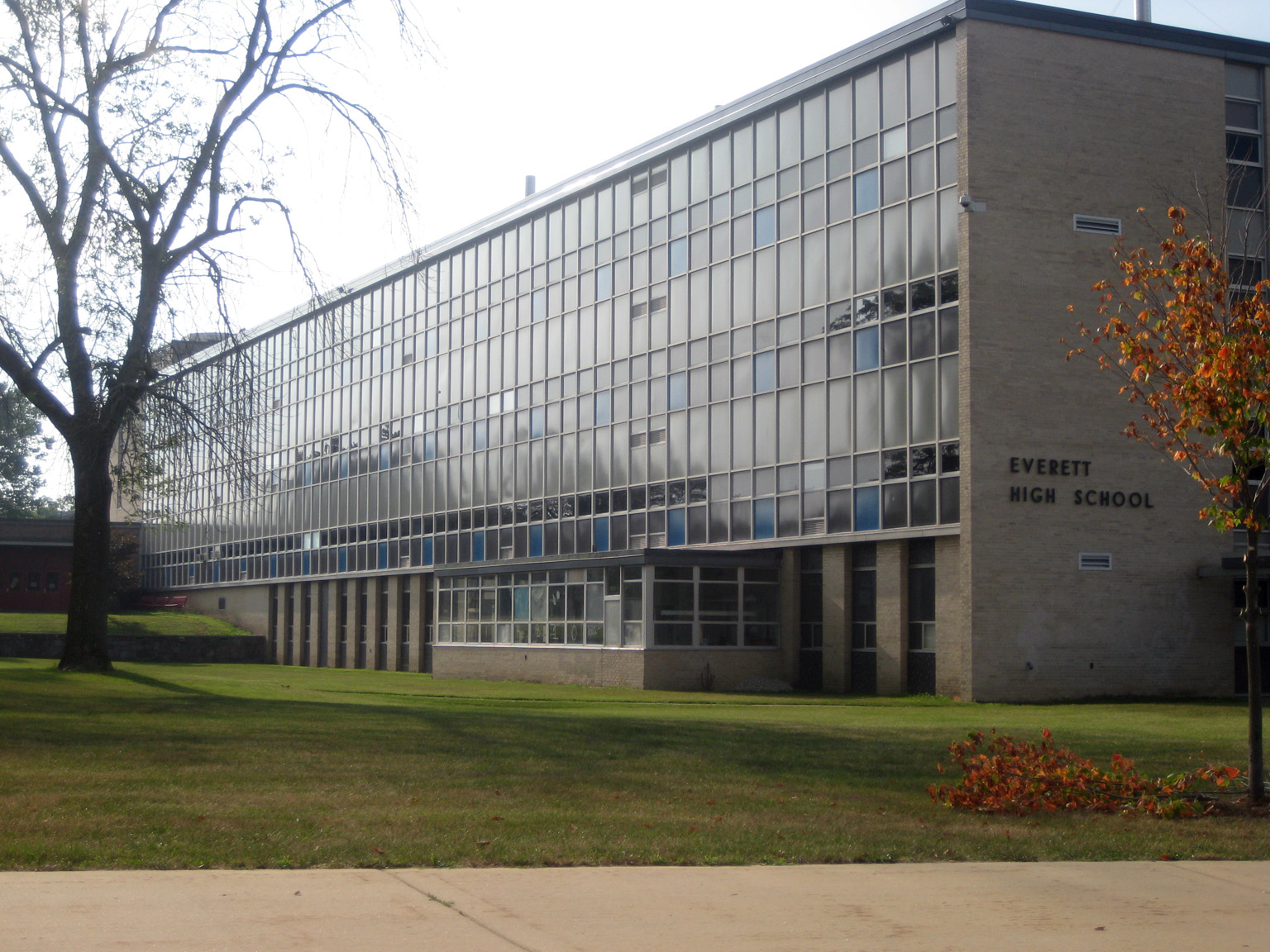

Location
- 3900 Stabler St. Lansing, Michigan; United States; 42°41′32″N 84°33′22″W

Information
- School type: Public, magnet high school
- Established: 1934
- School district: Lansing School District
- Principal: Amy Boyles
- Staff: 56.47 (FTE)
- Grades: 7 to 12
- Enrollment: 1,090 (2023-2024)
- Student to teacher ratio: 19.30
- Colors: Red, White and Light Blue
- Athletics conference: MHSAA, Class A Capital Area Activities Conference
- Nickname: Vikings
- Website: www.lansingschools.net/everett/

Student assessments
- 2021–22 school year Change vs. prior year

M-STEP 11th grade proficiency rates (Science / Social Studies)
- Advanced %: 6.0 / ≤5
- Proficient %: 14.6 / –
- PR. Proficient %: 9.3 / 57.6
- Not Proficient %: 70.2 / 23.2

Average test scores
- SAT Total: 834.7 (▼ −88.3)

Everett High School is a public, magnet high school located on the south side of Lansing, Michigan.

== Athletics ==
Everett's sports teams are known as the Vikings, known for their rivalry with the Big Reds of JW Sexton High School, and were Class A State Champions in Boys Basketball in 1977 and 2004. Retrieved on 26 November 2008. Also back-to-back Class A State Champions in 2001, 2000 and Class A State Runners-up in 1999 in Girls Basketball. Everett was the Class A state champion in Track and Field under coach Ron Barr in 1983 and 1985.

== Notable alumni ==
- Alexa Canady, first black female neurosurgeon
- Bruce Fields, former MLB player (Detroit Tigers, Seattle Mariners)
- Carol Hutchins, Michigan Wolverines softball coach
- Earvin "Magic" Johnson, former Los Angeles Lakers player, NCAA champion at Michigan State, Gold Medalist with the 1992 United States men's Olympic basketball team and Naismith Memorial Basketball Hall of Famer
- Lisa Kron, American actress and playwright, 2015 winner of Tony Award for Best Original Score and for Best Book of a Musical for Fun Home.
- Bruce Look, former MLB player (Minnesota Twins)
- Dean Look, former MLB player (Chicago White Sox) and NFL referee
- Sheena Moore, former WNBA player
- Goran Suton, former NBA player for the Utah Jazz
- Carl Thomas, former NBA player (Golden State Warriors)
- Charles Thomas, former NBA player (Detroit Pistons)
