= Jelica Komnenović =

Yugoslavian-born Serbian basketball player

Personal information
- Born: 20 April 1960 (age 66) Foča, PR Bosnia-Herzegovina, FPR Yugoslavia
- Listed height: 1.79 m (5 ft 10 in)
- Listed weight: 74 kg (163 lb)

Career history
- Univerzitet Priština
- Partizan
Medals
Women's basketball
Representing Yugoslavia
Olympic Games
Bronze medal – third place	1980 Moskva	Team competition
EuroBasket
Silver medal – second place	1987 Cadiz	Team competition
Bronze medal – third place	1980 Banja Luka	Team competition
Universiade
Gold medal – first place	1987 Zagreb	Team competition
Bronze medal – third place	1983 Edmonton	Team competition

Jelica Komnenović (born 20 April 1960 or 16 April 1960) is a former basketball player who competed for Yugoslavia in the 1980 Summer Olympics and in the 1984 Summer Olympics.
