= Latoya Williams =

American basketball player

Personal information
- Born: July 18, 1987 (age 37); Gainesville, Florida, U.S.
- Listed height: 6 ft 4 in (1.93 m)

Career information
- College: Chipola JC
- Playing career: 2009–present
- Position: Center

Career history
- MUKS Poznan
- Hapoel Tel Aviv
- ŽKK Partizan
- Ravenna Esperides

Career highlights and awards
- Serbian Cup (2011); League Champion (2011)

Latoya Williams (born July 18, 1987) is an American women's basketball player.

== College ==
Latoya Williams attended Chipola Junior College in Florida. Latoya Williams was a WBCA All American for Chipola Lady Indians. She led the Lady Indians to make history by taking third place in the National Junior College Athletic Association Women’s Basketball Tournament

She was named to the NJCAA All Tournament Team along with teammate Marneshia Hall. She scored 71 total points in the tournament and an average of 19.5 points per game. Williams finished first in three point scoring hitting 7 of 8 for an 87.5 percentage

Latoya Williams was a Women's Basketball Coaches Association All American for Junior Colleges in 2008 and 2009.

== Career ==
After playing for Chipola Junior College, Latoya signed with the MUKS Poznan in Polish 1st division for the 2009–2010 season. She averaged 10.7 points and 6.5 rebounds per game http://www.regeneracomsports.com/basketball_women_player-latoya_williams-487.html. Latoya started the 2010–11 season playing for Hapoel Tel Aviv where she averaged 12.3 points and 9.3 rebounds before finishing the season with ŽKK Partizan where she won the League and the Cup. Latoya Williams signed with Esperides, in Greek 1st division, during the 2011–12 season and averaged 23.3 points and 14.2 rebounds per game in a spectacular season.

Williams signed with the San Antonio Silver Stars in the Women's National Basketball Association (WNBA) in 2012, but was waived before the season.
