= Sanja Orozović =

Serbian basketball player

Personal information
- Born: 11 May 1990 (age 36) Subotica, SR Serbia, SFR Yugoslavia
- Listed height: 1.83 m (6 ft 0 in)
- Listed weight: 79 kg (174 lb)

Career information
- Playing career: 2006–present
- Position: Forward

Career history
- 2006–2010: Spartak Subotica
- 2010: Partizan
- 2010–2011: Spartak Subotica
- 2011–2013: Athlete Celje
- 2013–2015: PEAC-Pécs
- 2015–2016: Okzhetpes Kokshetay
- 2016: Spartak Subotica
- 2016–2017: TS Ostrovia
- 2017: Partizan 1953
- 2017–2018: Budućnost Bemax
- 2018: Geas Basket
- 2018: Spartak Subotica
- 2018–2019: Breiðablik
- 2019–2020: KR
- 2020–2021: Skallagrímur
- 2021–2022: Fjölnir
- 2022–2023: Breiðablik
- 2023–2024: Spartak Subotica
- 2024–2025: ŽKK Vojvodina 021

Career highlights
- WABA Champion (2018); Icelandic Super Cup (2020)

Sanja Orozović (Serbian: Сања Орозовић; born 11 May 1990) is a Serbian-Hungarian professional basketball player. In 2018, she won the Women Adriatic Basketball Association championship with Budućnost Bemax. In 2020, she won the Icelandic Super Cup with Skallagrímur.

== Playing career ==
=== Early career ===
After playing the previous seasons for Spartak Subotica, Partizan, Athlete Celje, PEAC-Pécs, Okzhetpes Kokshetay and Okzhetpes Kokshetay, Orozović spent the majority of the 2017-2018 season with Budućnost Bemax where she won the Women Adriatic Basketball Association championship on 25 March 2018. In April 2018, she signed with Geas Basket and went on to average 13.7 points in 6 games.

=== Move to Iceland ===
Orozović started the 2018-2019 season with Spartak Subotica, averaging 22.3 points and 10.8 rebounds in 6 games in the First Women's Basketball League of Serbia, before leaving the club in November 2018 and signing with Breiðablik of the Icelandic Úrvalsdeild kvenna. In her first game for Breiðablik, she scored 28 points in a narrow 78-74 loss against Stjarnan, including 20 points in the fourth quarter alone. On 24 November 2018, she scored a season high 32 points in Breiðablik's first victory of the season. For the season she averaged 20.6 points, 7.5 rebounds and 3.7 assists.

Prior to the 2019–20 season, Orozović signed with Úrvalsdeild powerhouse KR. In her debut, she scored 25 points, including the go-ahead basket with 15 seconds remaining, in KR's 80-79 victory against Keflavík. On 13 February 2020 she scored 24 points, including the last 6 points of the game, in an 99-104 overtime victory against defending cup and national champions Valur in the Icelandic Cup final four. In the Úrvalsdeild, she averaged 16.6 points and 8.8 rebounds per game. However, the last three games of the season and the whole playoffs were canceled due to the coronavirus pandemic in Iceland with KR finishing in second place.

In June 2020, Orozović signed with reigning Icelandic Cup champions Skallagrímur. On 20 September 2020, she scored 16 points in Skallagrímur's 74-68 victory against Valur in the Icelandic Super Cup. In the Úrvalsdeild, she averaged 14.2 points, 8.1 rebounds and 3.9 assists in 20 games but Skallagrímur missed out on the playoffs.

In July 2021, Sanja Orozović signed with Úrvalsdeild club Fjölnir. In her debut, she had 11 points, 9 rebounds and 8 assists in an 83-55 victory against Breiðablik in the Icelandic Cup. In the Cup Final, she posted 15 points and 4 rebounds in Fjölnir's 89-94 loss to Haukar. On 15 December, she had 44 points, 15 rebounds and 11 assists in a victory against Grindavík. For the regular season she averaged 19.3 points and 8.3 rebounds and helped Fjölnir finish with the best record in the league. In the playoffs, Fjölnir lost to eventual champions Njarðvík in the semi-finals.

In July 2022, Orozović signed with Breiðablik. On 5 October 2022, she had 32 points and 10 rebounds in Breiðablik's first win of the season. In 19 games, she averaged 19.1 points, 8.5 rebounds and 3.2 assists but missed 9 of the last 10 games of the season.

After five seasons in Iceland, Orozović signed with Spartak Subotica of the Serbian First League.
