= Iva Roglić =

Serbian basketball player

No. 17 – Novosadska ŽKA
- Position: Power forward
- League: First League of Serbia

Personal information
- Born: March 23, 1988 (age 38) Belgrade, SFR Yugoslavia
- Listed height: 1.89 m (6 ft 2 in)

Career information
- WNBA draft: 2010: undrafted
- Playing career: –present

Career history
- 2006–2009: Crvena zvezda
- 2009–2010: COB Calais
- 2010–2011: Szeged
- 2011–2012: Partizan
- 2013: Atomeromu KSC
- 2014: Wasserburg
- 2014: Chemnitz
- 2015: MTK Budapest
- 2015: Picken Claret
- 2015–2017: Budućnost Bemax
- 2017–present: Novosadska ŽKA
Medals
Women's basketball
Representing Serbia
European U20 Championship
Bronze medal – third place	2008 Italy	Team
World U19 Championship
Bronze medal – third place	2007 Slovakia	Team
European U18 Championship
Gold medal – first place	2006 Spain	Team

Iva Roglić (Serbian Cyrillic: Ива Роглић; born 23 March 1988, in Belgrade, SFR Yugoslavia) is a Serbian female basketball player.
