= Bojana Janković =

Serbian basketball player

Personal information
- Born: May 7, 1983 (age 43) Belgrade, SFR Yugoslavia
- Listed height: 1.84 m (6 ft 0 in)

Career information
- WNBA draft: 2004: undrafted
- Playing career: 2002–2016
- Position: Power forward

Career history
- 2002–2012: Partizan
- 2012–2013: Vršac
- 2013–2016: Partizan

Career highlights
- 3× Serbian League champion (2010, 2011, 2012); Serbian Cup winner (2011); Adriatic League champion (2011)

Bojana Janković (born May 7, 1983) is a former Serbian professional basketball player. She is currently the sports director in ŽKK Partizan. With ŽKK Partizan she won 3 national Championships (2009–10, 2010–11, 2011–12), national cup (2010–11) and Adriatic League Women (2011–12).

== Honours ==
ŽKK Partizan

- National Championship of Serbia (3): 2009–10, 2010–11, 2011–12
- National Cup of Serbia (1): 2010–11
- Adriatic League Women (1): 2011–12
