= Charles Thomas (basketball, born 1969) =

American basketball coach and player

Little Rock Trojans
- Title: Assistant coach
- League: Ohio Valley Conference

Personal information
- Born: October 3, 1969 (age 57) Dayton, Ohio, U.S.
- Listed height: 6 ft 4 in (1.93 m)
- Listed weight: 195 lb (88 kg)

Career information
- High school: Everett (Lansing, Michigan)
- College: Eastern Michigan (1987–1991)
- NBA draft: 1991: undrafted
- Playing career: 1991–2006
- Position: Point guard
- Number: 14,4,11
- Coaching career: 2006–present

Career history

Playing
- 1991–1992: Detroit Pistons
- 1992: Fort Wayne Fury
- 1992–1993: Columbus Horizon
- 1993: Grand Rapids Hoops
- 1993: La Crosse Catbirds
- 1994: Hartford Hellcats
- 1994–1995: Fort Wayne Fury
- 1995–1996: Grand Rapids Mackers
- 1996: Portland Mountain Cats
- 1996–1997: Grand Rapids Hoops
- 1997–1998: Atlantic City Seagulls
- 1998: Fort Wayne Fury
- 1998–1999: Connecticut Pride
- 1999–2000: Baltimore Bayrunners
- 2000–2002: Wollongong Hawks
- 2002–2004: Adelaide 36ers

Coaching
- 2006–2007: Radford (assistant)
- 2007–2009: Northwood (assistant)
- 2009–2017: Akron (assistant)
- 2017–2023: Duquesne (assistant)
- 2023–2024: Saint Louis (assistant)
- 2024-present: Little Rock (assistant)

Career highlights
- As Player: CBA champion (1999); NBL champion (2001)
- Stats at NBA.com
- Stats at Basketball Reference

Charles Thomas (born October 3, 1969) is an American basketball coach and former player. He is currently an assistant coach at the University of Arkansas at Little Rock.

== Early life ==
Born in Dayton, Ohio, Thomas played for Everett High School in Lansing, Michigan then played in college for Eastern Michigan University.

== Playing career ==
Thomas played professionally for the Detroit Pistons for the 1991–1992 season. Thomas spent eight years in other American leagues with multiple teams in the Continental Basketball Association (CBA), United States Basketball League, International Basketball Association and International Basketball League. He won a CBA championship with the Connecticut Pride in 1999.

Thomas also played four seasons in the Australian NBL, two seasons with the Wollongong Hawks, and two with the Adelaide 36ers. Thomas was a part of the 2000–01 championship-winning Wollongong Hawks club, before departing the club at the end of the next season for Adelaide.

== Coaching career ==
After his playing career ended, Thomas transitioned into coaching. He has served as an assistant coach for several collegiate programs. As of 2025, he is an assistant coach at the University of Arkansas at Little Rock.

== Personal life ==
Thomas's twin brother, Carl Thomas, also played in the NBA.
