= Sheena Moore =

American basketball player

Personal information
- Born: October 23, 1984 (age 42) Lansing, Michigan, U.S.
- Listed height: 1.70 m (5 ft 7 in)

Career information
- High school: Everett
- College: UNLV
- WNBA draft: 2006: undrafted
- Playing career: 2006–present
- Position: Point guard

Career history
- 2006–2008: ICIM Arad
- 2008–2009: Energa Toruń
- 2009: Botaş
- 2009: ICIM Arad
- 2009–2011: Partizan
- 2011–2012: TSV 1880 Wasserburg

Sheena Sharese Moore (born October 23, 1984) is an American professional basketball player. She plays at the point guard position. With ŽKK Partizan she won 2 national championships (2009–10, 2010–11) and national cup (2010–11).

== UNLV statistics ==
Legend
GP	Games played	GS	Games started	MPG	Minutes per game
FG%	Field goal percentage	3P%	3-point field goal percentage	FT%	Free throw percentage
RPG	Rebounds per game	APG	Assists per game	SPG	Steals per game
BPG	Blocks per game	PPG	Points per game	**Bold**	Career high

Year	Team	GP	Points	FG%	3P%	FT%	RPG	APG	SPG	BPG	PPG
2002–03	UNLV	29	233	**45.6**	34.8	69.2	2.2	1.0	0.8	–	8.0
2003–04	UNLV	28	**455**	44.7	**37.3**	69.1	**3.7**	2.9	1.5	**0.3**	**16.3**
2004–05	UNLV	**31**	452	38.3	33.1	**80.6**	3.6	**3.6**	1.4	0.3	14.6
2005–06	UNLV	30	388	37.7	25.8	73.7	3.2	3.2	**1.8**	0.2	12.9
Career	UNLV	118	1528	40.9	32.3	73.3	3.2	2.7	1.4	0.2	12.9
