= Biljana Majstorović =

Serbian basketball player

Personal information
- Born: 31 December 1959 (age 66) Belgrade, PR Serbia, FPR Yugoslavia
- Listed height: 1.91 m (6 ft 3 in)
- Listed weight: 75 kg (165 lb)
- Position: Center

Career history
- Partizan
Medals
Women's basketball
Representing Yugoslavia
Olympic Games
Bronze medal – third place	1980 Moskva	Team competition
EuroBasket
Silver medal – second place	1978 Poznan	Team competition
Bronze medal – third place	1980 Banja Luka	Team competition
Universiade
Bronze medal – third place	1983 Edmonton	Team competition
Bronze medal – third place	1985 Kobe	Team competition

Biljana Majstorović (born 31 December 1959 in Belgrade) is a former basketball player who competed for Yugoslavia in the 1980 Summer Olympics and in the 1984 Summer Olympics.
