= Basketball at the 2016 Summer Olympics =

19th Olympic Basketball Tournament
- Rio de Janeiro 2016

Tournament details
- Olympics: 2016 Summer Olympics
- Host nation: Brazil
- City: Rio de Janeiro
- Venue: Carioca Arena 1 Youth Arena
- Duration: 6–21 August 2016

Men's tournament
- Teams: 12
Medals
Gold medalists	United States
Silver medalists	Serbia
Bronze medalists	Spain

Women's tournament
- Teams: 12
Medals
Gold medalists	United States
Silver medalists	Spain
Bronze medalists	Serbia

Official website
- www.rio2016.com/en/basketball

Tournaments
← 2012	2020 →

Basketball at the 2016 Summer Olympics was the nineteenth appearance of the sport of basketball as an official Olympic medal event. It took place at Rio de Janeiro, Brazil, and was held from 6 August to 21 August 2016. The preliminary and knockout round matches for men were played inside the Carioca Arena 1 in Olympic Park which seated up to 16,000 spectators. The matches for women were played at the Youth Arena. This marked the first time that the men's and women's Olympic tournaments were played in multiple/separate venues.

The host country Brazil failed to make it to the quarterfinals of both the men's and women's tournaments, after being eliminated from the group stage. Three countries in both events took all of the medals: the United States (who won both gold medals), Serbia and Spain.

== Competition schedule ==
G	Group stage	¼	Quarter-finals	½	Semi-finals	B	Bronze medal match	F	Final

Date Event	Sat 6	Sun 7	Mon 8	Tue 9	Wed 10	Thu 11	Fri 12	Sat 13	Sun 14	Mon 15	Tue 16	Wed 17	Thu 18	Fri 19	Sat 20		Sun 21	
Men	G	G	G	G	G	G	G	G	G	G		¼		½			B	F
Women	G	G	G	G	G	G	G	G	G		¼		½		B	F		

== Venues ==
Rio de Janeiro, Rio de Janeiro
Carioca Arena 1	Basketball at the 2016 Summer Olympics is located in Rio de Janeiro	Youth Arena
Capacity: 16,000	Basketball at the 2016 Summer Olympics is located in Rio de Janeiro	Capacity: 5,000

Carioca Arena 1, the largest among the three Carioca Arenas, and Youth Arena, are the arenas that are being used for the basketball tournaments. The Ginásio do Maracanãzinho, site of the 1954 FIBA World Championship and the 1963 FIBA World Championship, hosted the indoor volleyball tournaments instead.

Carioca Arena 1 hosted the entire men's tournament and the women's knockout stage, while Youth Arena hosted the women's preliminary round.

== Qualification ==
The National Olympic Committees might enter up to one 12-player men's team and up to one 12-player women's team.

=== Hosts ===
Just as in 2012, the Olympic hosts were not guaranteed an Olympic berth. On 9 August 2015, it was announced that the Brazil men's and women's national teams would compete in the Olympic Basketball Tournament at the 2016 Rio Games after FIBA's Central Board decided to grant them automatic places at its meeting in Tokyo.

=== Men's qualification ===
Means of qualification	Date	Venue	Berths	Qualified
2014 FIBA Basketball World Cup	31 August – 14 September 2014	Spain	1	United States
Host nation	9 August 2015	(Japan) Tokyo	1	Brazil
2015 FIBA Oceania Championship	15–18 August 2015	Various	1	Australia
AfroBasket 2015	19–30 August 2015	(Tunisia) Radès	1	Nigeria
2015 FIBA Americas Championship	31 August – 12 September 2015	Mexico City	2	Venezuela
2015 FIBA Americas Championship	31 August – 12 September 2015	Mexico City	2	Argentina
EuroBasket 2015	5–20 September 2015	Various	2	Spain
EuroBasket 2015	5–20 September 2015	Various	2	Lithuania
2015 FIBA Asia Championship	23 September – 3 October 2015	(China) Changsha	1	China
2016 FIBA World Olympic Qualifying Tournaments	4–10 July 2016	(Serbia) Belgrade	1	Serbia
2016 FIBA World Olympic Qualifying Tournaments	4–10 July 2016	(Philippines) Pasay	1	France
2016 FIBA World Olympic Qualifying Tournaments	4–10 July 2016	(Italy) Turin	1	Croatia
Total			12	

=== Women's qualification ===
Means of qualification	Date	Venue	Berths	Qualified
2014 FIBA Women's Basketball World Cup	27 September – 5 October 2014	Turkey	1	United States
EuroBasket Women 2015	11–28 June 2015	Various	1	Serbia
Host nation	9 August 2015	(Japan) Tokyo	1	Brazil
2015 FIBA Americas Championship	9–16 August 2015	(Canada) Edmonton	1	Canada
2015 FIBA Oceania Championship	15–17 August 2015	Various	1	Australia
2015 FIBA Asia Championship	29 August – 5 September 2015	(China) Wuhan	1	Japan
AfroBasket Women 2015	24 September – 3 October 2015	(Cameroon) Yaoundé	1	Senegal
2016 FIBA World Olympic Qualifying Tournament	13–19 June 2016	(France) Nantes	5	Belarus
2016 FIBA World Olympic Qualifying Tournament	13–19 June 2016	(France) Nantes	5	China
2016 FIBA World Olympic Qualifying Tournament	13–19 June 2016	(France) Nantes	5	France
2016 FIBA World Olympic Qualifying Tournament	13–19 June 2016	(France) Nantes	5	Spain
2016 FIBA World Olympic Qualifying Tournament	13–19 June 2016	(France) Nantes	5	Turkey
Total			12	

== Men's competition ==
The competition consisted of two stages; a group stage followed by a knockout stage.

=== Group stage ===
The teams were divided into two groups of six countries, playing every team in their group once. Two points were awarded for a victory, one for a loss. The top four teams per group qualified for the quarter-finals.

==== Group A ====
Pos	Team	Pld	W	L	PF	PA	PD	Pts	Qualification
1	United States	5	5	0	524	407	+117	10	Quarterfinals
2	Australia	5	4	1	444	368	+76	9	Quarterfinals
3	France	5	3	2	423	378	+45	8	Quarterfinals
4	Serbia	5	2	3	426	387	+39	7	Quarterfinals
5	Venezuela	5	1	4	315	444	−129	6	
6	China	5	0	5	318	466	−148	5	

Source: FIBA
Rules for classification: 1) points; 2) head-to-head points; 3) head-to-head points difference; 4) head-to-head number of points scored.

==== Group B ====
Pos	Team	Pld	W	L	PF	PA	PD	Pts	Qualification
1	Croatia	5	3	2	400	407	−7	8 (Note: In games among the four teams at 3–2, Croatia and Spain were 2–1 while Argentina and Lithuania were 1–2. Croatia beat Spain 72–70, and Lithuania beat Argentina 81–73.)	Quarterfinals
2	Spain	5	3	2	432	357	+75	8	Quarterfinals
3	Lithuania	5	3	2	392	428	−36	8	Quarterfinals
4	Argentina	5	3	2	441	428	+13	8	Quarterfinals
5	Brazil (H)	5	2	3	411	407	+4	7	
6	Nigeria	5	1	4	392	441	−49	6	

Source: FIBA
Rules for classification: 1) points; 2) head-to-head points; 3) head-to-head points difference; 4) head-to-head number of points scored.
(H) Hosts

=== Knockout stage ===
The knockout stage was a single-elimination tournament consisting of three rounds. Semi-final losers played for the bronze medal.

Quarterfinals
17 August
Australia	90
Lithuania	64
17 August
Croatia	83
Serbia	86
17 August
Spain	92
France	67
17 August
United States	105
Argentina	78

Semifinals
19 August
Australia	61
Serbia	87
19 August
Spain	76
United States	82

Gold medal
21 August
Serbia	66
United States	96
Bronze medal
21 August
Australia	88
Spain	89

=== Statistical leaders ===
Statistic	Name	Total	Per game/Pct.
Points	(Spain) Pau Gasol	156	19.5
Rebounds	(Spain) Pau Gasol	71	8.9
Assists	(Australia) Matthew Dellavedova	57	7
Steals	(Argentina) Facu Campazzo	17	2.8
Blocks	(Spain) Pau Gasol	15	1.9
3-point field goals	(United States) Kevin Durant	25	.581
Free throws	(Croatia) Bojan Bogdanović	44	.786

== Women's competition ==
The competition consisted of two stages; a group stage followed by a knockout stage.

=== Group stage ===
The teams were divided into two groups of six countries, playing every team in their group once. Two points were awarded for a victory, one for a loss. The top four teams per group qualified for the quarter-finals.

==== Group A ====
Pos	Team	Pld	W	L	PF	PA	PD	Pts	Qualification
1	Australia	5	5	0	400	345	+55	10	Quarter-finals
2	France	5	3	2	344	343	+1	8 (Note: Head-to-head record: France 3 pts, +8 PD; Turkey 3 pts, −2 PD; Japan 3 pts, −6 PD)	Quarter-finals
3	Turkey	5	3	2	324	325	−1	8	Quarter-finals
4	Japan	5	3	2	386	378	+8	8	Quarter-finals
5	Belarus	5	1	4	347	361	−14	6	
6	Brazil (H)	5	0	5	335	384	−49	5	

Source: FIBA
Rules for classification: 1) points; 2) head-to-head points; 3) head-to-head points difference; 4) head-to-head number of points scored.
(H) Hosts

==== Group B ====
Pos	Team	Pld	W	L	PF	PA	PD	Pts	Qualification
1	United States	5	5	0	520	316	+204	10	Quarter-finals
2	Spain	5	4	1	387	333	+54	9	Quarter-finals
3	Canada	5	3	2	340	347	−7	8	Quarter-finals
4	Serbia	5	2	3	385	406	−21	7	Quarter-finals
5	China	5	1	4	371	428	−57	6	
6	Senegal	5	0	5	309	482	−173	5	

Source: FIBA
Rules for classification: 1) points; 2) head-to-head points; 3) head-to-head points difference; 4) head-to-head number of points scored.

=== Knockout stage ===
The knockout stage was a single-elimination tournament consisting of three rounds. Semi-final losers played for the bronze medal.

Quarter-finals
16 August
France	68
Canada	63
16 August
United States	110
Japan	64
16 August
Spain	64
Turkey	62
16 August
Australia	71
Serbia	73

Semi-finals
18 August
France	67
United States	86
18 August
Spain	68
Serbia	54

Gold medal
20 August
United States	101
Spain	72
Bronze medal
20 August
France	63
Serbia	70

=== Statistical leaders ===
Statistic	Name	Total	Per game/Pct.
Points	(Australia) Liz Cambage	141	23.5
Rebounds	(Spain) Astou Ndor	66	8.2
Assists	(Japan) Asami Yoshida	52	8.7
Steals	(France) Olivia Époupa	23	2.9
Blocks	(Spain) Astou Ndor	17	2.1
3-point field goals	(United States) Diana Taurasi	33	.579
Free throws	(Turkey) Lara Sanders	44	.815

== Medal summary ==
=== Medal table ===
Rank	Nation	Gold	Silver	Bronze	Total
1	United States	2	0	0	2
2	Serbia	0	1	1	2
2	Spain	0	1	1	2
Totals (3 entries)		2	2	2	6

=== Events ===
Event	Gold	Silver	Bronze
Men	United States; Jimmy Butler; Kevin Durant; DeAndre Jordan; Kyle Lowry; Harrison Barnes; DeMar DeRozan; Kyrie Irving; Klay Thompson; DeMarcus Cousins; Paul George; Draymond Green; Carmelo Anthony	Serbia; Miloš Teodosić; Marko Simonović; Bogdan Bogdanović; Stefan Marković; Nikola Kalinić; Nemanja Nedović; Stefan Birčević; Miroslav Raduljica; Nikola Jokić; Vladimir Štimac; Stefan Jović; Milan Mačvan	Spain; Pau Gasol; Rudy Fernández; Sergio Rodríguez; Juan Carlos Navarro; José Calderón; Felipe Reyes; Víctor Claver; Willy Hernangómez; Álex Abrines; Sergio Llull; Nikola Mirotić; Ricky Rubio
Women	United States; Lindsay Whalen; Seimone Augustus; Sue Bird; Maya Moore; Angel McCoughtry; Breanna Stewart; Tamika Catchings; Elena Delle Donne; Diana Taurasi; Sylvia Fowles; Tina Charles; Brittney Griner	Spain; Leticia Romero; Laura Nicholls; Silvia Domínguez; Alba Torrens; Laia Palau; Marta Xargay; Leonor Rodríguez; Lucila Pascua; Anna Cruz; Laura Quevedo; Laura Gil; Astou Ndour	Serbia; Tamara Radočaj; Sonja Petrović; Saša Čađo; Sara Krnjić; Nevena Jovanović; Jelena Milovanović; Dajana Butulija; Dragana Stanković; Aleksandra Crvendakić; Milica Dabović; Ana Dabović; Danielle Page

== Referees ==
The following referees were selected for the tournament.

- Ahmed Al-Bulushi
- Steven Anderson
- Scott Paul Beker
- Ilija Belošević
- Chahinaz Boussetta
- Christos Christodoulou
- Natalia Cuello Cuello
- Duan Zhu
- Juan González
- Lauren Holtkamp
- Hwang In-tae
- Damir Javor
- Carlos Julio
- Karen Lasuik
- Olegs Latisevs
- Leandro Lezcano
- Guilherme Locatelli
- Robert Lottermoser
- Cristiano Maranho
- Vaughan Mayberry
- Anne Panther
- Ferdinand Pascual
- Piotr Pastusiak
- Sreten Radović
- José Reyes
- Borys Ryzhyk
- Stephen Seibel
- Roberto Vázquez
- Eddie Viator
- Nadege Anaize Zouzou

== See also ==
- Wheelchair basketball at the 2016 Summer Paralympics
