= Tijana Ajduković =

Serbian basketball player (born 1991)

USK Praha
- Position: Center
- League: Czech League

Personal information
- Born: 3 June 1991 (age 35) Bačka Topola, SFR Yugoslavia
- Listed height: 6 ft 6 in (1.98 m)

Career information
- WNBA draft: 2011: undrafted
- Playing career: 2006–present

Career history
- 2006–2010: Spartak Subotica
- 2010–2012: Hemofarm
- 2012–2013: WBC Parma
- 2013–2014: Pinkk Pécsi 424
- 2014–2015: Katarzynki Toruń
- 2015–2016: USK Praha
Medals
Women's basketball
Representing Serbia
EuroBasket Women
Gold medal – first place	2015 Budapest	Team
Mediterranean Games
Silver medal – second place	2009 Pescara	Team
European U20 Championship
Bronze medal – third place	2008 Italy	Team

Tijana Ajduković (Serbian Cyrillic: Тијана Ајдуковић; born 3 June 1991) is a Serbian professional women's basketball player who plays for USK Praha (women's basketball) of the Czech League. Standing at 6 ft 6 in (1.98 m), she plays at the center position. She also represents the Serbian national basketball team.

== International career ==
She represented Serbian national basketball team at the EuroBasket 2015 in Budapest where they won the gold medal, and qualified for the 2016 Olympics, first in the history for the Serbian team.
