= Biljana Stanković =

Personal information
- Born: 11 September 1974 (age 52) Vršac, SFR Yugoslavia
- Listed height: 1.77 m (5 ft 10 in)
- Listed weight: 65 kg (143 lb)

Career information
- Playing career: 1990—2009, 2009–2017
- Position: Point guard
- Coaching career: 2016–present

Career history

Playing
- 1990–2009: Hemofarm
- 2009–2012: Hemofarm
- 2012–2013: Partizan
- 2013–2014: Vršac
- 2014: Radivoj Korać
- 2014–2015: Spartak Noginsk
- 2015–2016: Danzio Timișoara
- 2016–2017: Vršac

Coaching
- 2016–present: Serbia U18 (assistant)
- 2017: Serbia U16 (assistant)
- 2018–2019: Skallagrímur

Biljana Stanković (Serbian Cyrillic: Биљана Станковић; born 11 September 1974 in Vršac, SFR Yugoslavia) is a Serbian basketball coach and former Serbian and Yugoslavian basketball player. She played at the point guard position and is a former member of national team of Serbia.

== Professional career ==
Stanković is the most victorious female player in Serbian basketball history, winning 24 titles in 28 seasons from 1990 to 2017.

== National team career ==
Stanković played over 100 games for the Serbian national team and was the team's captain for 7 years. She participated in three EuroBasket tournaments and one FIBA World Cup.

== Coaching career ==
In December 2018, Stanković was hired as the head coach of Úrvalsdeild kvenna club Skallagrímur, replacing recently fired Ari Gunnarsson.

== Honours ==
Hemofarm

- First League of FR Yugoslavia / Serbia and Montenegro (6): 1998, 1999, 2000, 2001, 2005, 2006
- Cup of FR Yugoslavia / Serbia and Montenegro (6): 1996, 1998, 1999, 2002, 2005, 2006
- First League of Serbia (3): 2007, 2008, 2009
- Cup of Serbia (5): 2007, 2008, 2009, 2010, 2012

Partizan

- First League of Serbia (1): 2013
- Cup of Serbia (1): 2013
- Adriatic League Women (1): 2013

Radivoj Korać

- First League of Serbia (1): 2014
- Cup of Serbia (1): 2014
- Adriatic League Women (1): 2014
