= Dunja Prčić =

Serbian basketball player

Personal information
- Born: 17 February 1987 (age 39) Subotica, SR Serbia, SFR Yugoslavia
- Listed height: 1.81 m (5 ft 11 in)

Career information
- WNBA draft: 2009: undrafted
- Playing career: 2003–2014
- Position: Shooting guard / small forward

Career history
- 2003–2005: Spartak Subotica
- 2005–2009: Crvena zvezda
- 2009–2012: Partizan
- 2012: Novi Zagreb
- 2013: Željezničar Sarajevo
- 2013–2014: Partizan
Medals
Women's basketball
Representing Serbia
European U20 Championship
Silver medal – second place	2007 Bulgaria	Team
World U19 Championship
Silver medal – second place	2005 Tunisia	Team
European U18 Championship
Gold medal – first place	2005 Hungary	Team
European U16 Championship
Gold medal – first place	2003 Turkey	Team

Dunja Prčić (Serbian: Дуња Прчић; born 17 February 1987) is a former Serbian female basketball player.

== Personal life ==
Dunja is a twin sister of Serbian basketball player Iva Prčić.
