= Marina Maljković =

Serbian professional basketball coach (born 1981)

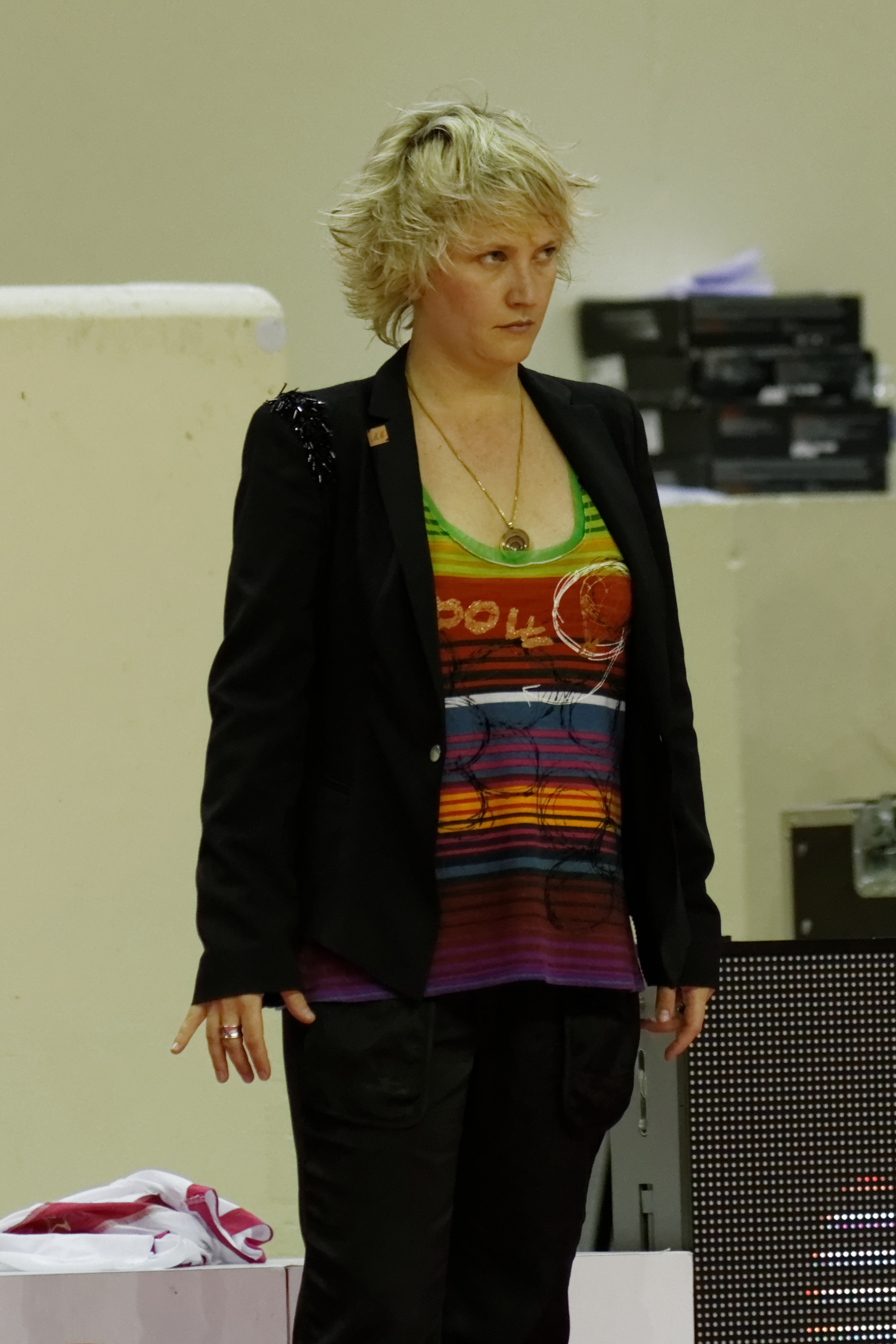
- Marina Maljković in 2013

Crvena zvezda
- Position: Head coach

Personal information
- Born: 26 September 1981 (age 45) Belgrade, SFR Yugoslavia
- Coaching career: 2004–present

Career history

Coaching
- 2004–2007: Ušće Belgrade
- 2007–2009: Hemofarm
- 2009–2013: Partizan Belgrade
- 2011–2017: Serbia
- 2013–2016: Lyon Basket
- 2016–2018: Galatasaray
- 2017–2025: Serbia
- 2018–2020: Shanghai Swordfish
- 2020–2022: Denso Iris
- 2022–2023: Fenerbahçe
- 2025–present: Crvena zvezda
Medals
Women's basketball
Head coach for Serbia
Olympic Games
Bronze medal – third place	2016 Rio de Janeiro	Team
EuroBasket Women
Gold medal – first place	2021 France/Spain
Gold medal – first place	2015 Hungary/Romania
Bronze medal – third place	2019 Latvia/Serbia

Marina Maljković (Serbian Cyrillic: Марина Маљковић; born 26 September 1981) is a Serbian professional basketball coach. She currently serves as a head coach for Crvena zvezda and the Serbia women's national basketball team.

== Club career ==
As a daughter of Serbian coach and four-time Euroleague winner Božidar Maljković, Marina had the opportunity to start her coaching career early at the age of 16, when she became an assistant coach in Abeilles de Rueil, a French club she was playing for at the time. In 2002, she graduated from The College for Sports Coaches in Belgrade. In the same year, she became the head coach of the female section of KK Ušće, aged 21. She was the coach of the youth categories, and, at the same time, she managed to lead the senior team as the club advanced from the third to the first league of Serbia and Montenegro in just two years. In 2007, Maljković became the head coach of the female section of ŽKK Hemofarm, winning two league titles and two national cups in the following two years. In 2009, she moved to ŽKK Partizan. In the following four years, Partizan has won four national championships, two national cups and two Women's Adriatic League titles. Maljković has been the national champion of Serbia for six consecutive seasons, and has won six "Coach of the Year" awards. In September 2013, Maljković signed a two-year contract with Union Lyon Basket Féminin, a club competing in the Ligue Féminine de Basketball, the top women’s French professional basketball league.

In June 2018, she signed for the Shanghai Swordfish of the WCBA.

On 19 April 2022 she signed with Fenerbahçe of the Turkish Super League.

== Serbian national team ==
Maljković was an assistant coach of the Serbia and Montenegro national Under-18 team, which has achieved fourth place at the 2004 FIBA Europe Under-18 Championship for Women, as well as Serbia and Montenegro national Under-19 team at the 2005 FIBA Under-19 World Championship for Women, which has won the silver medal after finals loss to the team USA.

In August 2011, Maljković has been appointed head coach of the Serbia women's national basketball team. At the EuroBasket Women 2013, Serbia national team managed to pass into the semifinals, which was the greatest national team success since the breakup of Yugoslavia in 1991. Aged 32, Maljković was the youngest, and the only female head coach at the championship.

She led the team once again at the EuroBasket 2015 in Budapest where they won the gold medal, and qualified for the 2016 Olympics, first in the history for the Serbian team. In the autumn of 2015, she extended her contract with the Basketball Federation of Serbia to be the team's selector over next four years; she also requested that one third of her salary be forwarded to all 12 clubs of the First Women's Basketball League of Serbia. In January 2017, she left the head coaching position.

On 14 December 2017, Maljković has been appointed head coach of the Serbia national team for the second time.

== Career achievements ==
=== Club competitions ===
As head coach:

- EuroLeague champion: 1 (with Fenerbahçe: 2022–23)
- EuroCup champion: 1 (with Galatasaray: 2017–18)
- Women's Adriatic League champion: 2 (with Partizan: 2011–12, 2012–13)
- Turkish Women's Basketball Super League champion: 2 (with Fenerbahçe: 2021–22, 2022–23)
- Challenge round champion: 1 (with Lyon Basket: 2014)
- Serbian League champion: 6 (with Hemofarm: 2007–08, 2008–09 and Partizan: 2009–10, 2010–11, 2011–12, 2012–13)
- Serbian Cup winner : 4 (with Hemofarm: 2007–08, 2008–09 and Partizan: 2010–11, 2012–13)

=== National team competitions ===
As head coach:

- 2016 Summer Olympics: Bronze
- EuroBasket Women 2015: Gold
- EuroBasket Women 2021: Gold
- EuroBasket Women 2019: Bronze

As an assistant coach:

- 2005 U-19 World Championship for Women: Silver

== Honours ==
- Order of Karađorđe's Star

== See also ==
- List of EuroBasket Women winning head coaches
- List of EuroLeague Women winning coaches
