= Tamara Radočaj =

Serbian basketball player (born 1987)

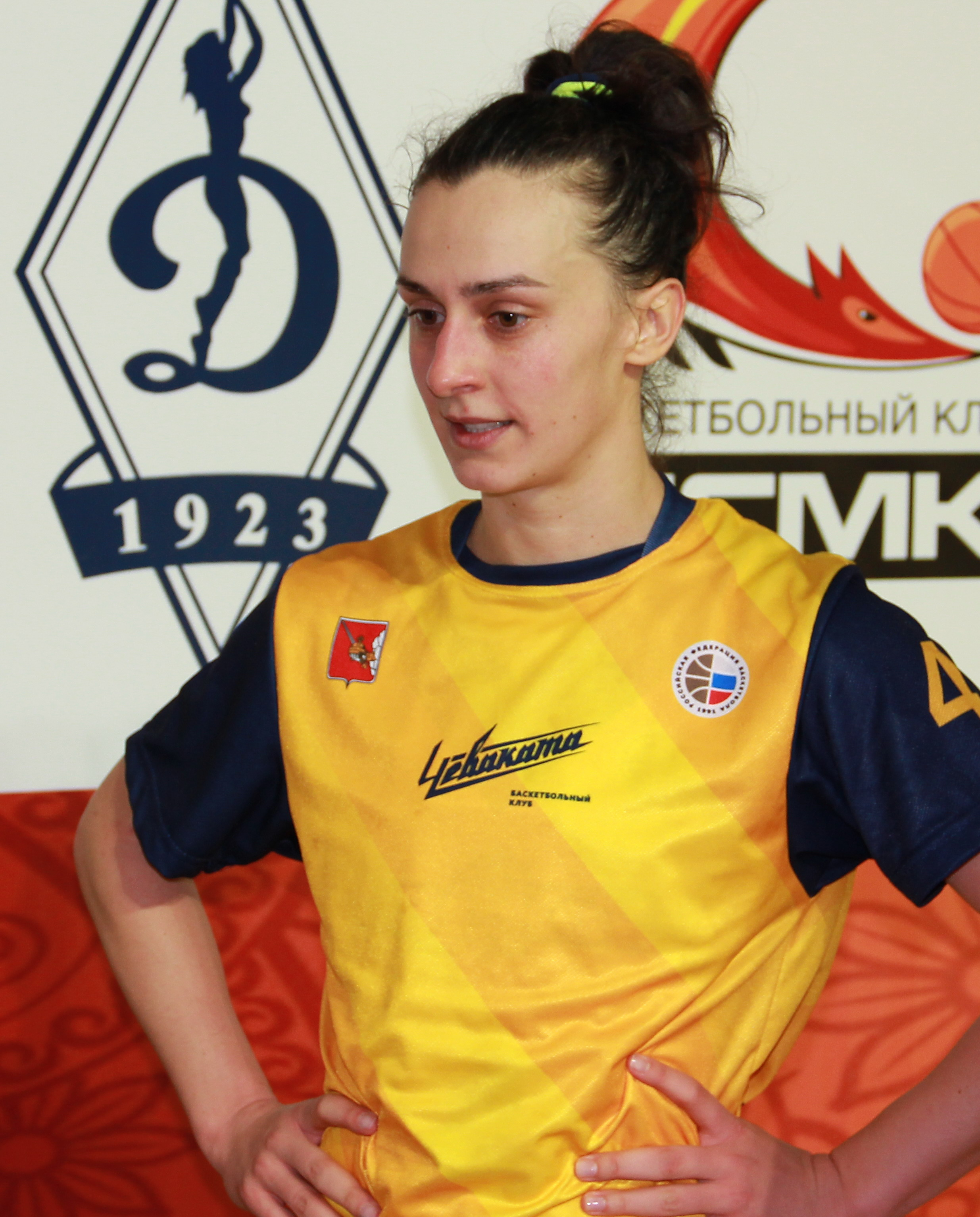

No. 4 – Chevakata Vologda
- Position: Point guard
- League: RPL

Personal information
- Born: 23 December 1987 (age 38) Vršac, SFR Yugoslavia
- Listed height: 5 ft 7 in (1.70 m)

Career information
- WNBA draft: 2007: undrafted
- Playing career: 2004–present

Career history
- 2004–2011: Hemofarm
- 2011–2013: Partizan
- 2013–2014: CUS Cagliari
- 2014–2016: UNI Győr
- 2016–present: Chevakata Vologda

Career highlights
- 7× Serbian League champion (2005–2009, 2012, 2013); 7× Serbian Cup winner (2005–2010, 2013); 2× Adriatic League champion (2012, 2013)
Medals
Women's basketball
Representing Serbia
Olympic Games
Bronze medal – third place	2016 Rio de Janeiro	Team
EuroBasket
Gold medal – first place	2015 Budapest
European U20 Championship
Silver medal – second place	2007 Bulgaria	Team
World U19 Championship
Silver medal – second place	2005 Tunisia	Team
European U18 Championship
Gold medal – first place	2005 Hungary	Team
European U16 Championship
Gold medal – first place	2003 Turkey	Team

Tamara Radočaj (Serbian Cyrillic: Тамара Радочај, born 23 December 1987) is a Serbian professional women's basketball player who plays for Chevakata Vologda of the Russian Premier League. Standing at 1.70 m (5 ft 7 in), she plays at the point guard position. She also represents the Serbian national basketball team.

== International career ==
She represented Serbian national basketball team at the EuroBasket 2015 in Budapest where they won the gold medal, and qualified for the 2016 Olympics, first in the history for the Serbian team.
