= Dajana Butulija =

Serbian basketball player

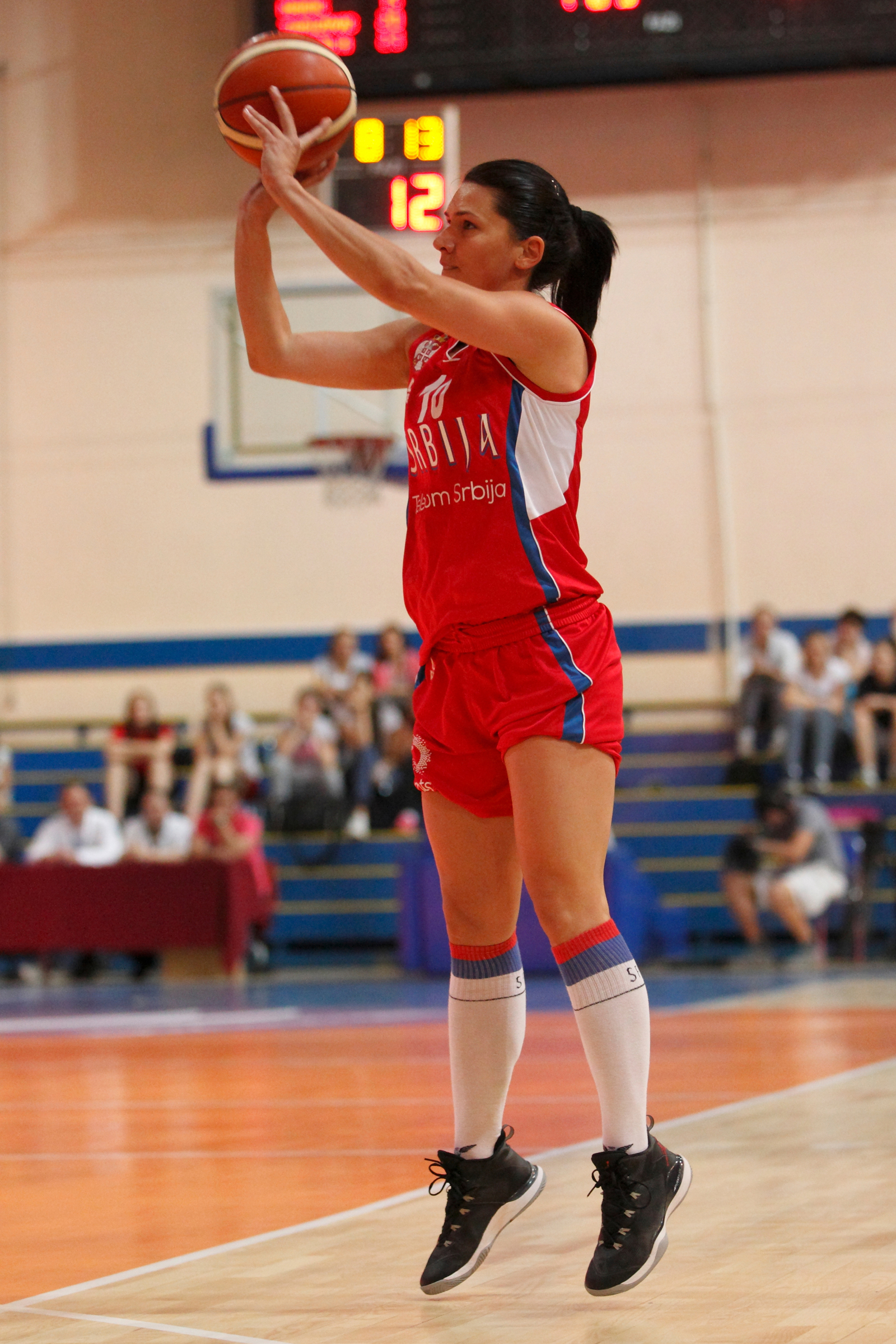
- Dajana Butulija with national team in 2015

No. 10 – AZS-UMCS Lublin
- Position: Shooting guard
- League: Basket Liga Kobiet

Personal information
- Born: 23 February 1986 (age 40) Kikinda, SR Serbia, SFR Yugoslavia
- Listed height: 1.76 m (5 ft 9 in)

Career information
- WNBA draft: 2008: undrafted
- Playing career: 2003–2021

Career history
- 2003–2007: Ušće
- 2007–2009: Hemofarm
- 2009–2013: Partizan
- 2013–2014: Luleå BBK
- 2014–2015: Sallén Basket
- 2015: CREF
- 2015–2016: Union Lyon Basket
- 2016: Radivoj Korać
- 2016–2017: Cluj-Napoca
- 2017–2019: AZS-UMCS Lublin
- 2020: Ślęza Wrocław

Career highlights
- 6x Serbian league champion (2008–2013); 4x Serbian cup winner (2008, 2009, 2011, 2013); 2x Adriatic League Women champion (2012, 2013); Swedish League champion (2014)
Medals
Women's basketball
Representing Serbia
Olympic Games
Bronze medal – third place	2016 Rio de Janeiro	Team
EuroBasket
Gold medal – first place	2015 Hungary/Romania
Gold medal – first place	2021 France/Spain
Bronze medal – third place	2019 Latvia/Serbia
World U19 Championship
Silver medal – second place	2005 Tunisia	Team

Dajana Butulija (Serbian Cyrillic: Дајана Бутулија, born 23 February 1986) is a Serbian former professional women's basketball player. Standing at 1.76 m (5 ft 9 1/2 in), she plays at the shooting guard position. She represents the Serbian national basketball team.

== International career ==
She represented Serbian national basketball team at the EuroBasket 2015 in Budapest where they won the gold medal, and qualified for the 2016 Olympics, first in the history for the Serbian team.
