= ŽKK Vršac =

Serbian basketball team

Vršac
- Nickname: The Pharmacists; The little pills
- Leagues: First League of Serbia
- Founded: 1946
- Arena: Millennium Centar (capacity: 4,400)
- Location: Vršac, Serbia
- Team colors: Brown and White
- Head coach: Miroslav Kanjevac
- Championships: 9 National Championships; 11 National Cups
- Website: kkvrsac.rs

Ženski košarkaški klub Vršac (Serbian Cyrillic: Женски кошаркашки клуб Вршац, English: Women's Basketball Club Vršac) is a Serbian women's basketball team from Vršac, Serbia. The club currently plays in First League of Serbia. ŽKK Vršac is a holder of 9 national championships and 11 national cups. They play their home games at the Millennium Centar.

== History ==
ŽKK Vršac was founded in 1946, under the name of unity. Throughout history, several times changed his name. The first notable steps towards preparing the ground for today's successful are headed in 1952, when the junior team became champion of Yugoslavia. In the team's talent and basketball legend of ŽKK Vršac Olgica Vukobrat, one of the best basketball players of Yugoslavia, which is still active sports official. This was followed by the onset of Vojvodina and Serbian league.

The most successful club is achieved when the sponsor was pharmaceutical company Hemofarm. Concern Hemofarm took over the club 1992, and the same year players have qualified for the First B league. The first trophy was won 1996, when they won the national cup which was played in Vršac. In the following period Hemofarm won 9 national championships and 11 national cups.

On the international scene, debuted in the Ronchetti Cup in the 1995–96 season when they won third place in the group with 2 wins and 4 losses. In the season 2001–02 they reached the knockout stages, and the next season the quarterfinals. Played in the Euroleague final in season 1997–98 to 1998–99. To them, according to the official FIBA rankings, then raised to 3rd place in Europe. The little pills, otherwise, won third place in the unofficial world championship in Brazil in 1998. year. In the Eurocup 2009, qualified for the quarter-finals.

In the season 2011/12 "The little pills" have debuted in the Adriatic League, in which they reached the play-offs. From 2012, Hemofarm has ceased to sponsor the club, so the club's name was changed to ŽKK Vršac. In the first season under that name, Vršac players have continued to compete in the Adriatic League. The creation of these results involved the little pills' Biljana Stanković, who has won 20 titles with the most successful basketball in Serbia.

=== Name changes through history ===
- 1946 : club founded under the name of ŽKK Jedinstvo
- 1959 : renamed to ŽKK Mladost
- 1967 : renamed to ŽKK Inex Brixol
- 1977 : renamed to ŽKK Agropanonija
- 1981 : renamed to ŽKK Vršac
- 1989 : renamed to ŽKK Inex
- 1992 : renamed to ŽKK Hemofarm
- 2012 : renamed again to ŽKK Vršac

== Arena ==
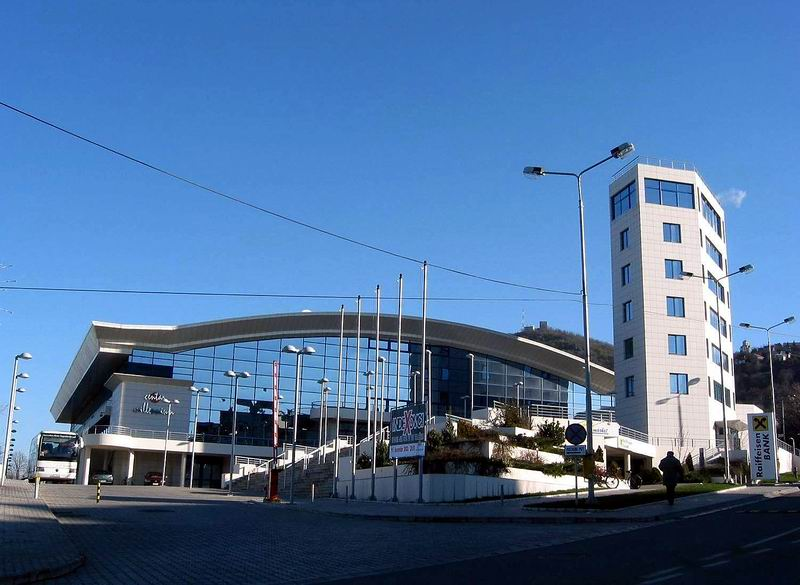
Millennium Centar

Millennium Centar is one of the most beautiful buildings including sports and business and entertainment centers of Serbia. It was officially opened on April 5, 2001, and the opening ceremony was attended by a large number of guests from the world of politics, business and diplomacy.

For the last ten years, Millennium Centar is a unique name for the operating system, which consists of various segments. As of December 2012 The majority owner of this magnificent building, which operates as a limited company, it became a municipality of Vršac, which is the Foundation "Hemofarm" took a 60 percent shareholding.

It is the Millennium Centar is held EuroBasket 2005, The Universiade 2009, The European Championship in the men's and women's handball 2012, World League in Volleyball 2006 and 2007 and many other international sports competitions. The arena is also used for concerts and other live entertainment.

In addition to a large sports hall, which has about 5,000 seats, there is a modern gym and sauna, and beneath it lies a shot. The Hall use and basketball players of KK Vršac.

== Honours ==
National Championships – 9

- First League of Serbia:
  - Winners (9) : 1998, 1999, 2000, 2001, 2005, 2006, 2007, 2008, 2009
  - Runners-up (6) : 1996, 1997, 2002, 2010, 2011, 2012

National Cups – 11

- Cup of Serbia:
  - Winners (11) : 1996, 1998, 1999, 2002, 2005, 2006, 2007, 2008, 2009, 2010, 2012
  - Runners-up (2) : 2004, 2011

== Notable former players ==
- Olgica Vukobrat
- Biljana Stanković
- Bojana Janković
- Dajana Butulija
- Tamara Radočaj
- Gordana Grubin – Vesković
- Saša Čađo
- Gordana Bogojević – Kovačević
- Brankica Hadžović
- Tijana Ajduković
- Milka Bjelica
- Lara Mandić
- Katarina Lazić – Tomić
- Marina Marković
- Slobodanka Tuvić
- Dragana Soldar

== Notable former coaches ==
- (Serbia and Montenegro) Miodrag Vesković ( –1999)
- (Serbia and Montenegro) Miroslav Popov (1999–2003)
- (Serbia and Montenegro) Goran Topić (2003–2004)
- (Serbia and Montenegro) Miroslav Popov (2004–2005)
- (Serbia) Jovica Antonić (2005–2007)
- (Serbia) Marina Maljković (2007–2009)
- (Serbia) Zoran Višić (2009–2010)
- (Serbia) Bogdan Bulj (2010; interim)
- (Serbia) Miroslav Popov (2010–2013)
- (Serbia) Miroslav Kanjevac (2017–present)

== See also ==
- List of basketball clubs in Serbia by major honours won
