= ŽKK Kovin =

- Founded: 1990
- Arena: Kovin Hall (capacity: 1,000)
- Location: Kovin, Serbia
- Team colors: Yellow and Blue

Ženski košarkaški klub Kovin (Serbian Cyrillic: Женски кошаркашки клуб Ковин), commonly referred to as ŽKK Kovin, is a women's professional basketball club based in Kovin, Serbia

== History ==
Kovin competed in the Ronchetti Cup in 1998, 1999 and 2001.

In September 2011, Kovin came out from competing in the First Women's Basketball League of Serbia.

== Honours ==
=== Domestic ===
National Cups – 1

- Cup of FR Yugoslavia:
  - Winners (1): 2000

== Notable former players ==
- (Serbia) Majda Močnik

Mina Maksimović

- (Serbia and Montenegro) Miljana Bojović
- (Serbia and Montenegro) Dragoslava Žakula
- (Serbia) Marina Marković
- (Serbia) Nevena Jovanović
- (Serbia) Tatjana Živanović

Ma

== Notable former coaches ==
- (Serbia and Montenegro) Dragomir Bukvić
- (Serbia and Montenegro) Zoran Kovačić
- (Serbia and Montenegro) Miroslav Kanjevac

== See also ==
- List of basketball clubs in Serbia by major honours won
