= ŽKK Voždovac =

Serbian women's basketball club from Belgrade, Serbia

- Founded: 1955
- Dissolved: 2013
- Arena: SC Šumice (capacity: 2.000)
- Location: Belgrade, Serbia
- Team colors: blue and White
- Championships: 2 National Championships; 2 National Cups

Ženski košarkaški klub Voždovac (Serbian Cyrillic: Женски кошаркашки клуб Вождовац, English: Women's basketball club Voždovac) is a Serbian women's basketball club from Belgrade, Serbia.

== History ==
In the 1971-72 season, the club won "The Double" - for the first time the Yugoslavian League, and the national cup, and played in the inaugural edition of FIBA Women's European Cup Winners' Cup (subsequently renamed Ronchetti Cup) two-legged final, against the eventual winners Spartak Leningrad.

== Honours ==
=== Domestic ===
National Championships – 2

- First League of SFR Yugoslavia:
  - Winners (2): 1972, 1975
  - Runners-up (3): 1974, 1982, 1983

National Cups – 2

- Cup of SFR Yugoslavia:
  - Winners (2): 1972, 1984
  - Runners-up (1): 1974

=== International ===
International titles – 0

- FIBA Cup Winners Cup:
  - Runners-up (1): 1972

== Notable former players ==
- Ružica Krstić
- Lenka Trajkovski
- Jasna Tanjević
- Zorica Kovrlija
- Slobodanka Malenović
- Branka Jovanović
- Jelka Kalenić
- Dragica Ćurulić
- Grozdana Katić
- Snežana Glavčić
- Dragoslava Matijašević
- Nevenka Tabaković
- Olivera Čangalović
- Gordana Jeremić
- Bojana Milošević
- Mira Ivanović
- Tanja Ilić-Pavlić
- Sonja Cimbaljević
- Jasmina Perazić
- Bojana Vulić
- Nataša Kovačević
- Marija Tonković
- Julijana Vojinović

== Notable former coaches ==
- Miroljub Stojković
- Slobodan Mićović
- Aleksandar Stanimirović
- Vladislav Lučić
- Zoran Tir

== See also ==
- List of basketball clubs in Serbia by major honours won
