= ŽKK Partizan =

Partizan 1953
- Nickname: Crno-bele
- Leagues: First League of Serbia; Adriatic League
- Founded: 1953; 73 years ago
- History: ŽKK Partizan (1953–2015); ŽKK Partizan 1953 (2015–present)
- Arena: Ranko Žeravica Sports Hall (capacity: 5.000); Vizura Sports Center (capacity: 1.500)
- Location: Belgrade, Serbia
- Team colors: Black and White
- Head coach: Miljana Bojović
- Championships: 7 National Championships; 5 National Cups; 2 Adriatic League
Home	Away

Ženski košarkaški klub Partizan (Serbian Cyrillic: Женски кошаркашки клуб Партизан, lit. 'Women's Basketball Club Partizan'), commonly referred to as ŽKK Partizan or simply Partizan, is a women's professional basketball club based in Belgrade, Serbia. Since 2015, the club has been competing under the legal name Partizan 1953. It is part of the multi-sports club Partizan. They are currently competing in the Serbian First League. The club won seven national championships, five national cups and two Adriatic League. They play their home games at the Sports Hall "Ranko Žeravica".

== History ==
Alternate logo

=== Formation and early years (20th century) ===
The club was founded in 1953. Three times a champion Yugoslavia, in the seasons 1983–84, 1984–85 and 1985–86. Partizan were then lead Jelica Komnenović, Biljana Majstorović, Olivera Krivokapić, Stojna Vangelovska, Cvetana Dekleva, Dragana Simić, Merhunisa Omerović, Zorana Cvetković, Radmila Lekić, Dragana Boreli, Olgica Mašić, Sonja Krnjaja, Zorica Ivetić, Andreja Pukšić, Tanja Stevanović... Partizan is in this period and twice won the Cup in 1985 and 1986.

=== Marina Maljković's era (2009–2013) ===
After the dissolution of Yugoslavia did not have success until the 2009–10 when they became champions Serbia. The following 2010–11 was more successful because the players of Partizan won the double crown, winning the Championship and Cup.

In the season 2011–12 Partizan is the first time won the Adriatic League triumph in the final tournament of the Zenica. The club's was better in the final of the domestic Čelik score of 74:65 . At the end of the season, Partizan won again Championship which was a total of 6 Champion in the history of the club.

In the season 2012–13 Partizan were won by Cup after the final of the Lazarevac team won Radivoj Korać with 103:71. The most effective players were American Brooke Queenan with 23 points, Milica Dabović with 21 and Dajana Butulija with 19 points. Partizan is the Adriatic League completed no defeats, and defended trophy. After 20 wins from as many matches in the regular part of the league, the Final Four of the Novi Sad won in first the semi-finals Vojvodina to 94:72, and in the finals as well as the Cup was better than Radivoj Korać with 70:45. At the end of the season and seventh Champion's title by winning the final play-off Championship of Serbia over the team Radivoj Korać.

=== Turbulence and recovery (2013–2015) ===
During the summer of 2013 the club had major financial problems for which they were threatened to be extinguish club, but despite the club survive. As a result, coach Marina Maljković and almost the entire team left the club. In the next season the club came in from the rejuvenated squad. In the Cup Partizan lost in the final of the Radivoj Korać with result 90:64. In the championship of Serbia in the semi-finals lost to eternal rivals Red Star, and in the regional league in the quarterfinals lost to teams of Budućnost Volcano.

In the 2014-15 season the club substituted by with identical composition as the last season with the ambition to consolidate the club financially and as regards the sporting aspect to at least repeat the results of last season. In the regional league is Partizan finished at 5th place in Group A, in the championship Serbia lost to the team of Vojvodina in the semi-finals and in Cup he lost in the semifinals of the Radivoj Korać.

=== Partizan 1953 (2015–present) ===
During 2015, the club is in the senior competition gave up participating in all competitions, the club formally stayed to function to restore the debts he had. In the meantime, established a new club under the name Partizan 1953 in which have moved all players from the previous club. Club he started from Second league of Serbia as the lowest rank of competition in Serbia.

After season 2015–16, club is provided back to the first division, which is also provided participate in regional league in next season by giving up certain clubs from Serbia that are based on the results in the previous season to provide.

== Arena ==
=== Ranko Žeravica Sports Hall ===
Ranko Žeravica Sports Hall is a multi-purpose indoor arena located in the New Belgrade municipality and it has a capacity of 5,000 seats.

=== Vizura Sports Center ===
Vizura Sports Center is a multi-purpose indoor arena located in the Zemun municipality and it has a capacity of 1,500 seats.

== Supporters ==
The Grobari (Serbian Cyrillic: Гробари) are supporters of the Belgrade football club Partizan. They generally support all clubs within the Sports Association Partizan, especially football and basketball teams.

== Honours ==
=== Domestic ===
National Championships – 7

- First League of SFR Yugoslavia:
  - Winners (3): 1984, 1985, 1986
- First League of Serbia:
  - Winners (4): 2010, 2011, 2012, 2013

National Cups – 5

- Cup of SFR Yugoslavia:
  - Winners (2): 1985, 1986
- Cup of Serbia:
  - Winners (3): 2011, 2013, 2018

=== International ===
International titles – 2

- Adriatic League Women:
  - Winners (2): 2011–12, 2012–13

== Current squad ==
Note: Flags indicate national team eligibility at FIBA-sanctioned events. Players may hold other non-FIBA nationalities not displayed.

ŽKK Partizan roster
Players
Coaches

Pos.	No.	Nat.	Name	Ht.	Age
PF	00	(Serbia)	Jovanović, Marta (C)	1.85 m (6 ft 1 in)	23 – 3 July 2002
SF	4	(Serbia)	Vučković, Nevena	1.77 m (5 ft 10 in)	28 – 3 February 1998
SG	5	(Serbia)	Olić, Sofija	1.75 m (5 ft 9 in)	25 – 25 September 2000
SF	7	(Serbia)	Perišić, Mina	1.82 m (6 ft 0 in)	22 – 27 October 2003
SF	9	(Serbia)	Mlađenović, Anđela	1.72 m (5 ft 8 in)	23 – 13 October 2002
PG	13	(Serbia)	Stojić, Marina	1.76 m (5 ft 9 in)	25 – 28 September 2000
PG	15	(Serbia)	Kovačević, Danijela	1.76 m (5 ft 9 in)	23 – 2 December 2002
C	19	(Serbia)	Marjanović, Gorana	1.93 m (6 ft 4 in)	26 – 26 March 2000
C	21	(Serbia)	Miljević, Jovana	1.82 m (6 ft 0 in)
SF	23	(Serbia)	Dubrovina, Natalija		29 – 6 July 1996
PF	26	(Serbia)	Karalić, Marina	1.82 m (6 ft 0 in)	32 – 3 April 1994
SF	27	(Serbia)	Samardžić, Nina	1.81 m (5 ft 11 in)	23 – 11 August 2002
PF	88	(Serbia)	Luković, Branka	1.88 m (6 ft 2 in)	31 – 23 January 1995

Head coach

- (Serbia) Slađan Ivić

Assistant coach(es)

- (Serbia) Ivan Vasiliević

Strength & conditioning coach(es)

- (Serbia) Nikola Maljković

Legend

- (C) Team captain
- Injured

- Roster
Updated: 15 November 2020

== Partizan management ==
As of 19 April 2017

Current staff
- President: Živomir Novaković
- Vice-president: Žarko Zečević
- Vice-president: Radovan Draškić
- General secretary: Srbobran Filipović
- Director of basketball: Bojana Janković

== Notable former players ==
- Ljiljana Stanojević
- Mirjana Mujbegović
- Biljana Majstorović
- Olivera Krivokapić
- Zorana Cvetković
- Dragana Boreli
- Zorica Ivetić
- Olgica Mašić
- Radmila Lekić
- Sonja Krnjaja
- Dragana Marković
- Tanja Stevanović
- Jelica Komnenović
- Stojna Vangelovska
- Jelena Popović
- Cvetana Dekleva
- Andreja Pukšić
- Dragana Simić
- Merhunisa Omerović
- Mirjana Prljević
- Olja Petrović
- Jasmina Milojković
- Jelica Čanak
- Tamara Ružić
- Hajdana Radunović
- Nataša Ivančević
- Mina Maksimović
- Katica Krivić
- Branka Stojićević
- Sanja Vesel
- Tanja Vesel
- Tanja Stokić
- Dijana Bukovac
- Mirjana Medić
- Aleksandra Radulović
- Jadranka Savić
- Sanja Lancoš
- Svetlana Stanić
- Ivanka Matić
- Tanja Turanjanin
- Ljiljana Božičković
- Slavica Ilić
- Tamara Velanac
- Gordana Tešić
- Aleksandra Samardžić
- Ilvana Zvizdić
- Jelica Dabović
- Aleksandra Kukulj
- Dušanka Ćirković
- Iva Roglić
- Dina Šesnić
- Jefimija Karakašević
- Alicia Gladden
- Jelena Špirić
- Sanja Kovrlija
- Suzana Milovanović
- Jovana Milovanović
- Ivana Drmanac
- Andrijana Vasović
- Jovana Vukoje
- Ljiljana Tomašević
- Jelena Dangubić
- Jelena Maksimović
- Biljana Stjepanović
- Svetlana Petrović
- Milena Krstajić
- Bojana Vulić
- Tijana Brdar
- Jelena Radić
- Mirjana Velisavljević
- Milena Vukićević
- Sheena Moore
- Jasmine Stone
- Latoya Williams
- Maja Miljković
- Nataša Bučevac
- Dunja Prčić
- Neda Đurić
- Mirjana Beronja
- Brooke Queenan
- Milica Dabović
- Dajana Butulija
- Tamara Radočaj
- Nevena Jovanović
- Biljana Stanković
- Saša Čađo
- Ivona Jerković
- Nataša Kovačević
- Marija Prlja
- Jelena Antić
- Aleksandra Vujović
- Jovana Karakašević
- Jovana Popović
- Irena Matović
- Jovana Pašić
- Jelena Vučetić
- Ivona Bogoje
- Jelena Ivezić
- Bojana Janković
- Lidija Vučković
- Julijana Vojinović
- Miljana Bojović

== Notable former coaches ==
- Borislav Ćorković
- Dragoljub Pljakić
- Vladislav Lučić
- Ljiljana Stanojević
- Dragomir Bukvić
- Miroslav Kanjevac
- Slađan Ivić
- Dragan Vuković
- Marina Maljković
- Milan Dabović
- Srđan Antić

== See also ==
- KK Partizan
- JSD Partizan
