= ŽKK Spartak Subotica =

Serbian basketball team

Spartak Subotica
- Nickname: Golubice (Doves)
- Leagues: First League of Serbia
- Founded: 1945; 80 years ago
- Arena: Subotica Sport Palace
- Capacity: 3,500
- Location: Subotica, Serbia
- Team colors: Blue, white
- Website: zkkspartak.rs

Ženski košarkaški klub Spartak (Serbian Cyrillic: Женски кошаркашки клуб Спартак, English: Spartak Women's Basketball Club), commonly referred to as ŽKK Spartak Subotica, is a women's professional basketball team based in Subotica, Serbia. They are currently competing in the First League of Serbia.

== Arena ==
Sport Palace Subotica is a multi-purpose indoor arena located in the Subotica and it has a capacity of 3,500 seats.

== Notable former players ==
- Tijana Ajduković
- Sanja Orozović
- Dunja Prčić
- Jovana Rad
- Iva Prčić
- Adrijana Knežević
