= First Women's Basketball League of Serbia =

Serbian sports league

Women's Basketball League of Serbia
- Founded: 2006; 19 years ago
- First season: 2006–07
- Country: Serbia
- Confederation: FIBA Europe
- Number of teams: 12
- Level on pyramid: 1st
- Relegation to: Second League of Serbia
- Domestic cup: Milan Ciga Vasojević Cup
- Current champions: Crvena zvezda Kombank (34th title) (2022–23)
- Most championships: Crvena zvezda Kombank (34 titles)
- Website: lige.kss.rs
- 2024–25 First Women's Basketball League of Serbia

The First Women's Basketball League of Serbia (Serbian: Прва женска лига Србије, romanized: Prva ženska liga Srbije; abbr. ПЖЛС or PŽLS), is a top-tier women's professional basketball league in Serbia. Founded in 2006, it is run by the Basketball Federation of Serbia (KSS).

The league is divided into two parts. The first part of the play all the clubs who have won a place in it. In the second part, called the playoffs, they play eight first clubs from the first division. Play starts from the quarter-final of the series, where the winner is decided in two games, the same system is in the semifinals, while the final series game in three wins. Clubs from Serbia who play in the Adriatic league, play along with the domestic the League.

== Champions ==
Season	Champion	Result	Runner-up	MVP	Champion's Coach
2006–07	Hemofarm	3–0	Crvena zvezda		(Serbia) Jovica Antonić
2007–08	Hemofarm	3–0	Crvena zvezda	(Serbia) Biljana Stanković	(Serbia) Marina Maljković
2008–09	Hemofarm	3–0	Partizan	(Serbia) Tamara Radočaj	(Serbia) Marina Maljković
2009–10	Partizan	2–0	Hemofarm	(Serbia) Dajana Butulija	(Serbia) Marina Maljković
2010–11	Partizan	3–0	Hemofarm	(Serbia) Dajana Butulija	(Serbia) Marina Maljković
2011–12	Partizan	3–0	Hemofarm	(Serbia) Aleksandra Katić	(Serbia) Marina Maljković
2012–13	Partizan	3–0	Radivoj Korać	(Serbia) Tamara Radočaj	(Serbia) Marina Maljković
2013–14	Radivoj Korać	3–1	Crvena zvezda	(Serbia) Adrijana Knežević	(Serbia) Miloš Pavlović
2014–15	Radivoj Korać	3–1	Vojvodina	(Montenegro) Jelena Vučetić	(Serbia) Miloš Pavlović
2015–16	Radivoj Korać	3–0	Crvena zvezda	(Serbia) Sanja Mandić	(Serbia) Miloš Pavlović
2016–17	Crvena zvezda	3–1	Radivoj Korać	(Serbia) Teodora Turudić	(Serbia) Dragan Vuković
2017–18	Crvena zvezda	3–1	Partizan 1953	(Serbia) Jovana Adamović	(Serbia) Dragan Vuković
2018–19	Crvena zvezda	3–0	021	(Serbia) Jovana Adamović	(Serbia) Dragan Vuković
2019–20	Canceled due to the COVID-19 pandemic in Serbia				
2020–21	Crvena zvezda	2–1	Art Basket	(Serbia) Ivana Katanić	(Serbia) Dragan Vuković
2021–22	Crvena zvezda	3–0	Art Basket	(Serbia) Aleksandra Katić	(Serbia) Dragan Vuković
2022–23	Crvena zvezda	3–2	Kraljevo		(Serbia) Dragan Vuković

== All–time national champions ==
Total number of national champions won by Serbian clubs. Table includes titles won during the Yugoslav Women's Basketball League (1945–1992) and the First Women's Basketball League of Serbia and Montenegro (1992–2006) as well.

Team	Winners	Runners-up	Years Won	Years Runner-up
Crvena zvezda	34	19	1946, 1947, 1948, 1949, 1950, 1951, 1952, 1953, 1954, 1955, 1956, 1957, 1958, 1959, 1960, 1963, 1973, 1976, 1977, 1978, 1979, 1980, 1981, 1989, 1992, 1993, 1996, 2004, 2017, 2018, 2019, 2021, 2022, 2023	1961, 1962, 1964, 1965, 1968, 1969, 1970, 1971, 1975, 1987, 1991, 1994, 1995, 2001, 2003, 2007, 2008, 2014, 2016
Vršac (Hemofarm)	9	6	1998, 1999, 2000, 2001, 2005, 2006, 2007, 2008, 2009	1996, 1997, 2002, 2010, 2011, 2012
Partizan	7	2	1984, 1985, 1986, 2010, 2011, 2012, 2013	2009, 2018
Radnički Beograd	6	6	1961, 1962, 1964, 1965, 1966, 1968	1946, 1956, 1958, 1959, 1960, 1967
Radivoj Korać	3	2	2014, 2015, 2016	2013, 2017
Vojvodina	2	6	1969, 1970	1972, 1992, 2004, 2005, 2006, 2015
Voždovac	2	3	1972, 1975	1974, 1982, 1983
Bečej	2	–	1994, 1995	–
Dinamo Pančevo	1	–	1997	–
Proleter Zrenjanin	–	3	–	1948, 1949, 1951
Art Basket	–	2	–	2021, 2022
Student Niš	–	1	–	1993
Spartak Subotica	–	1	–	1999
Beopetrol	–	1	–	2000
021	–	1	–	2019
Kraljevo	–	1	–	2023

== See also ==
- Basketball Federation of Serbia
- Serbia women's national basketball team
- Milan Ciga Vasojević Cup
