= 2016 Serbia Olympic basketball team =

The 2016 Serbia Olympic basketball team represented Serbia and won the silver medal at the 2016 Summer Olympics in Rio de Janeiro, Brazil. They were qualified for the Summer Olympics by winning the FIBA World Olympic Qualifying Tournament in Belgrade. The team was coached by Aleksandar Đorđević, with assistant coaches Miroslav Nikolić, Milan Minić, and Jovica Antonić.

== Timeline ==
- May 20: 24-player preliminary roster announced
- June 16: 15-man roster announcement
- July 4–9: Olympic Qualifying Tournament
- July 15: Start of a training camp on Kopaonik mountain
- July 22: 12-man roster announcement
- July 23: The end of the training camp
- July 29–August 1: Exhibition games
- August 6–21: 2016 Summer Olympics

== Roster ==
The following is the Serbia roster in the men's basketball tournament of the 2016 Summer Olympics

Serbia men's national basketball team – 2016 Summer Olympics roster
Players
Coaches

Pos.	No.	Name	Age – Date of birth	Height	Club	Ctr.
PG	4	Miloš Teodosić (C)	29 – March 19, 1987	1.95 m (6 ft 5 in)	CSKA Moscow	(Russia)
SF	5	Marko Simonović	30 – May 30, 1986	2.01 m (6 ft 7 in)	Crvena Zvezda	(Serbia)
SG	7	Bogdan Bogdanović	23 – August 18, 1992	1.98 m (6 ft 6 in)	Fenerbahce	(Turkey)
PG	9	Stefan Marković	28 – April 25, 1988	1.95 m (6 ft 5 in)	Baloncesto Málaga	(Spain)
SF	10	Nikola Kalinić	24 – November 8, 1991	2.02 m (6 ft 8 in)	Fenerbahce	(Turkey)
G	11	Nemanja Nedović	25 – June 16, 1991	1.92 m (6 ft 4 in)	Baloncesto Málaga	(Spain)
PF	12	Stefan Birčević	26 – December 13, 1989	2.10 m (6 ft 11 in)	Estudiantes	(Spain)
C	13	Miroslav Raduljica	28 – January 5, 1988	2.13 m (7 ft 0 in)	Panathinaikos	(Greece)
C	14	Nikola Jokić	21 – February 19, 1995	2.08 m (6 ft 10 in)	Denver Nuggets	(United States)
C	15	Vladimir Štimac	28 – September 25, 1987	2.11 m (6 ft 11 in)	Crvena Zvezda	(Serbia)
PG	24	Stefan Jović	25 – November 3, 1990	1.98 m (6 ft 6 in)	Crvena Zvezda	(Serbia)
PF	25	Milan Mačvan	26 – November 16, 1989	2.06 m (6 ft 9 in)	Emporio Armani	(Italy)

Head coach

- (Serbia) Aleksandar Đorđević

Assistant coach(es)

- (Serbia) Miroslav Nikolić
- (Serbia) Jovica Antonić
- (Serbia) Milan Minić

Conditioning trainer

- (Serbia) Mladen Mihajlović

Legend

- (C) Team captain
- Club – describes last
  club before the tournament
- Age – describes age
  on 6 August 2016

The following were candidates to make the team:

Earlier candidates
Player	Team (Note: Team at the time player was a candidate)	Added	Removed	Reason
Nemanja Bjelica	(United States) Minnesota Timberwolves	May 20, 2016	July 17, 2016	Injured
Marko Gudurić	(Serbia) Crvena zvezda	May 20, 2016	July 22, 2016	12-man roster cut
Nemanja Dangubić	(Serbia) Crvena zvezda	May 20, 2016	July 22, 2016	12-man roster cut

== Exhibition games ==
The Serbia roster has participated at the Super 4 in Córdoba, Argentina (July 29 – August 1), together with Argentina, Croatia and France.

Super 4

29 July 2016
18:00 (UTC−3)

Report

France	88–105	Serbia
Scoring by quarter: 22–25, 22–25, 24–32, 20–23
Pts: Gobert 16; Rebs: Gobert 5 Asts: Diaw 7		Pts: Bogdanović 29; Rebs: Mačvan 5 Asts: Teodosić 7

Orfeo Superdomo, Córdoba
Attendance: not available
Referees: Juan Fernández, Fabricio Vito

30 July 2016
21:00 (UTC−3)

Report

Argentina	79–74	Serbia
Scoring by quarter: 30–14, 10–24, 18–20, 21–16
Pts: Delfino 21; Rebs: Nocioni 5 Asts: Campazzo 5		Pts: Raduljica 13; Rebs: Jokić, Raduljica 7 Asts: Jović 5

Orfeo Superdomo, Córdoba
Attendance: not available
Referees: Juan Fernández, Fabricio Vito, Roberto Smith

1 August 2016
18:00 (UTC−3)

Report

Serbia	86–77	Croatia
Scoring by quarter: 16–19, 20–21, 28–20, 22–17
Pts: Raduljica 17; Rebs: four players 5 Asts: Bogdanović 4		Pts: Bogdanović 18; Rebs: Šarić 9 Asts: Simon 3

Orfeo Superdomo, Córdoba
Attendance: not available
Referees: Roberto Smith, Gabriel Tarifeño, Aníbal Brites

== Olympic play ==
=== Preliminary round ===
Pos	Team	Pld	W	L	PF	PA	PD	Pts	Qualification
1	United States	5	5	0	524	407	+117	10	Quarterfinals
2	Australia	5	4	1	444	368	+76	9	Quarterfinals
3	France	5	3	2	423	378	+45	8	Quarterfinals
4	Serbia	5	2	3	426	387	+39	7	Quarterfinals
5	Venezuela	5	1	4	315	444	−129	6	
6	China	5	0	5	318	466	−148	5	

Source: FIBA
Rules for classification: 1) points; 2) head-to-head points; 3) head-to-head points difference; 4) head-to-head number of points scored.

==== Venezuela ====
6 August 2016
22:30

Boxscore

Venezuela	62–86	Serbia
Scoring by quarter: 14–18, 9–26, 18–24, 21–18
Pts: Echenique 12; Rebs: Colmenares 6 Asts: Vargas 5		Pts: Bogdanović 19; Rebs: Štimac 9 Asts: Nedović 4

Carioca Arena 1, Rio de Janeiro
Attendance: 5,063
Referees: Christos Christodoulou (GRE), Duan Zhu (CHN), Roberto Vázquez (PUR)

==== Australia ====
8 August 2016
14:15

Boxscore

Serbia	80–95	Australia
Scoring by quarter: 23–26, 20–14, 20–22, 17–33
Pts: Raduljica 25; Rebs: Bogdanović 8 Asts: Marković 4		Pts: Mills 26; Rebs: Bogut 12; Asts: Dellavedova 13

Carioca Arena 1, Rio de Janeiro
Attendance: 5,409
Referees: Cristiano Maranho (BRA), Borys Ryzhyk (UKR), Guilherme Locatelli (BRA)

==== France ====
10 August 2016
14:15

Boxscore

Serbia	75–76	France
Scoring by quarter: 17–26, 19–14, 24–17, 15–19
Pts: Raduljica 16; Rebs: Jokić 7 Asts: Teodosić 9		Pts: de Colo 22; Rebs: Diaw 9 Asts: Diaw 9

Carioca Arena 1, Rio de Janeiro
Attendance: 6,901
Referees: Borys Ryzhyk (UKR), Stephen Seibel (CAN), Oļegs Latiševs (LAT)

==== United States ====
12 August 2016
19:00

Boxscore

United States	94–91	Serbia
Scoring by quarter: 27–15, 23–26, 22–21, 22–29
Pts: Irving 15; Rebs: George 9 Asts: Irving, Cousins 5		Pts: Jokić 25; Rebs: Jokić 6 Asts: Teodosić 6

Carioca Arena 1, Rio de Janeiro
Attendance: 11,413
Referees: Stephen Seibel (CAN), Guilherme Locatelli (BRA), Piotr Pastusiak (POL)

==== China ====
14 August 2016
22:30

Boxscore

Serbia	94–60	China
Scoring by quarter: 24–18, 19–10, 35–15, 16–17
Pts: Bogdanović 19; Rebs: Jokić 7 Asts: Marković, Teodosić 5		Pts: Yi 20; Rebs: Wang 8 Asts: Ailun 8

Carioca Arena 1, Rio de Janeiro
Attendance: 7,367
Referees: Juan García (ESP), Guilherme Locatelli (BRA), Anne Panther (GER)

=== Knockout round ===
==== Quarterfinal – Croatia ====
There was little to separate the two teams in the first half, with Serbia up 20-19 at the end of the opening period and Croatia taking a 38-32 advantage at the break. Serbia took control thanks to a third quarter in which they outscored Croatia 34-14. They took their biggest lead of the night, 66-52, when Bogdan Bogdanović buried a three-pointer with 22 seconds left in the period. Croatia answered by going on a 22-7 run that got them within 74-73 on Darko Planinić's pair of free-throws with 3:26 remaining. Serbia stayed in front but Croatia were breathing down their neck. Sasha Đorđević's side got a bit of breathing room when Miroslav Raduljica made the second of two foul shots to make it 79-75 with 27 seconds and that forced Croatia in having to foul intentionally to stop the clock but ultimately running out of time.

17 August 2016
22:15

Boxscore

Croatia	83–86	Serbia
Scoring by quarter: 19–20, 19–12, 14–34, 31–20
Pts: Bogdanović 28; Rebs: Planinić 9 Asts: Simon 5		Pts: Bogdanović 18; Rebs: three players 4 Asts: Teodosić 10

Carioca Arena 1, Rio de Janeiro
Attendance: 9,027
Referees: Juan García (ESP), Borys Ryzhyk (UKR), Roberto Vázquez (PUR)

==== Semifinal – Australia ====
Serbia were in control of the game right from the start, scoring the opening eight points and forcing Australia into bad shots and costly turnovers. It didn't help that the Boomers were ice cold, going 2-of-15 from the field, as they trailed 16-5 by the end of the first quarter. It was more of the same in the second period as Australia continued to struggle to find the bottom of the net while Serbia tightened their grip on the game by closing out the first half on a 9-0 run for a commanding 35-14 lead. Australia broke out of their slump in the third quarter, scoring 24 points but Serbia had 31 of their own as they headed into the final frame up 66-38, with the win all but wrapped up. Miloš Teodosić was in attack mode right from the get go, scoring 6 of Serbia's first 12 points. It gave Serbia the start they needed and they never looked back. Teodosić finished with 22 points and 5 assists.

19 August 2016
19:00

Boxscore

Australia	61–87	Serbia
Scoring by quarter: 5–16, 9–19, 24–31, 23–21
Pts: Mills, Motum 13; Rebs: Baynes 8 Asts: Broekhoff 4		Pts: Teodosić 22; Rebs: Jokić 11; Asts: Teodosić 5

Carioca Arena 1, Rio de Janeiro
Attendance: 9,655
Referees: Stephen Seibel (CAN), Robert Lottermoser (GER), Oļegs Latiševs (LAT)

==== Gold medal game – United States ====
21 August 2016
15:45

Boxscore

Serbia	66–96	United States
Scoring by quarter: 15–19, 14–33, 14–27, 23–17
Pts: Nedović 14; Rebs: Jokić 4 Asts: three players 3		Pts: Durant 30; Rebs: Cousins 15; Asts: Lowry 5

Carioca Arena 1, Rio de Janeiro
Attendance: 10,658
Referees: José Reyes (MEX), Borys Ryzhyk (UKR), Juan García (SPA)

=== Statistics ===
Legend
GP	Games played	GS	Games started	MPG	Minutes per game
FG%	Field-goal percentage	3FG%	3-point field-goal percentage	FT%	Free-throw percentage
RPG	Rebounds per game	APG	Assists per game	SPG	Steals per game
BPG	Blocks per game	PPG	Points per game	EF	PIR per game

Player	GP	GS	MPG	FG%	3FG%	FT%	RPG	APG	SPG	BPG	EF	PPG
Stefan Birčević	7	4	7.7	.364	.167	.750	1.0	.3	.1	.0	1.4	1.7
Bogdan Bogdanović	8	4	26.1	.458	.366	.875	3.6	2.6	1.3	.1	12.0	12.3
Nikola Jokić	8	2	22.5	.500	.300	.762	6.0	2.4	1.5	.6	14.5	9.1
Stefan Jović	8	1	15.3	.440	.286	.600	2.6	2.1	.6	.0	5.4	3.4
Nikola Kalinić	8	7	18.0	.438	.091	.900	3.3	1.4	1.1	.1	7.4	4.8
Milan Mačvan	8	4	14.4	.476	.375	.846	2.6	1.3	.5	.0	8.3	7.1
Stefan Marković	8	7	22.4	.425	.333	.909	2.5	3.3	.9	.0	8.8	6.3
Nemanja Nedović	8	1	13.0	.425	.438	.800	1.1	1.6	.9	.1	5.1	5.6
Miroslav Raduljica	8	6	19.1	.612	.000	.735	3.3	1.3	.4	.6	14.0	14.8
Marko Simonović	7	0	12.8	.556	.400	.625	1.4	.4	.7	.3	5.1	4.1
Vladimir Štimac	8	0	5.6	.533	.000	.500	3.3	.3	.1	.1	4.4	2.6
Miloš Teodosić	8	4	25.5	.370	.326	.852	2.0	5.4	.4	.0	10.3	12.1
Total	8	8	200.0	.467	.331	.772	36.0	22.1	8.4	2.0	95.8	83.1

Source: 2016 Summer Olympics

== See also ==
- Serbia at the 2016 Summer Olympics
- 2017 Serbia men's EuroBasket team
