= 2016 Serbia OQT basketball team =

The 2016 Serbia OQT basketball team represented Serbia and won the spot for the 2016 Summer Olympics at the FIBA World Olympic Qualifying Tournament in their capital, Belgrade. They were qualified for the Qualification tournament by taking the 4th place in the EuroBasket 2015. The team was coached by Aleksandar Đorđević, with assistant coaches Miroslav Nikolić, Milan Minić and Jovica Antonić.

== Timeline ==
- May 20: 24-player preliminary roster announced
- May 30: 16-man roster announcement
- June 16: 15-man roster announcement
- June 21–28: Exhibition games
- July 3: 12-man roster announcement
- July 4–9: Olympic Qualifying Tournament

== Roster ==
The following is the Serbia roster in the Olympic Qualifying Tournament

Serbian men's basketball national team roster
Players
Coaches

Pos.	No.	Name	Age – Date of birth	Height	Club	Ctr.
PG	4	Miloš Teodosić (C)	29 – March 19, 1987	1.95 m (6 ft 5 in)	CSKA Moscow	(Russia)
SF	5	Marko Simonović	30 – March 8, 1986	2.02 m (6 ft 8 in)	Crvena zvezda	(Serbia)
PG	6	Stefan Jović	25 – November 3, 1990	1.98 m (6 ft 6 in)	Crvena zvezda	(Serbia)
SG	7	Bogdan Bogdanović	23 – August 18, 1992	1.98 m (6 ft 6 in)	Fenerbahce	(Turkey)
SF	8	Nemanja Dangubić	23 – April 13, 1993	2.04 m (6 ft 8 in)	Crvena zvezda	(Serbia)
PG	9	Stefan Marković	28 – April 25, 1988	1.97 m (6 ft 6 in)	Baloncesto Málaga	(Spain)
SF	10	Nikola Kalinić	24 – November 8, 1991	2.02 m (6 ft 8 in)	Fenerbahce	(Turkey)
G	11	Nemanja Nedović	24 – June 16, 1991	1.92 m (6 ft 4 in)	Baloncesto Málaga	(Spain)
PF	12	Stefan Birčević	26 – December 13, 1989	2.10 m (6 ft 11 in)	Partizan	(Serbia)
C	13	Miroslav Raduljica	28 – January 5, 1988	2.13 m (7 ft 0 in)	Panathinaikos	(Greece)
C	14	Nikola Jokić	21 – February 19, 1995	2.11 m (6 ft 11 in)	Denver Nuggets	(United States)
C	15	Vladimir Štimac	28 – September 25, 1987	2.11 m (6 ft 11 in)	Crvena Zvezda	(Serbia)

Head coach

- (Serbia) Aleksandar Đorđević

Assistant coach(es)

- (Serbia) Miroslav Nikolić
- (Serbia) Jovica Antonić
- (Serbia) Milan Minić

Legend

- Club – describes last
  club before the tournament
- Age – describes age
  on 4 July 2016

The following were candidates to make the team:

Earlier candidates
Player	Team (Note: Team at the time player was a candidate)	Added	Removed	Reason
Ognjen Jaramaz	(Serbia) Mega Leks	May 20, 2016	May 30, 2016	16-man roster cut
Marko Kešelj	(Greece) Lavrio	May 20, 2016	May 30, 2016	16-man roster cut
Ognjen Kuzmić	(Greece) Panathinaikos	May 20, 2016	May 30, 2016	16-man roster cut
Vladimir Lučić	(Spain) Valencia	May 20, 2016	May 30, 2016	16-man roster cut
Vasilije Micić	(Serbia) Crvena zvezda	May 20, 2016	May 30, 2016	16-man roster cut
Dragan Milosavljević	(Germany) Alba Berlin	May 20, 2016	May 30, 2016	16-man roster cut
Nemanja Bjelica	(United States) Minnesota Timberwolves	May 20, 2016	June 16, 2016	Injured
Nikola Milutinov	(Greece) Olympiacos	May 20, 2016	June 16, 2016	Withdrew
Boban Marjanović	(United States) San Antonio Spurs	May 20, 2016	June 16, 2016	Withdrew
Marko Gudurić	(Serbia) Crvena zvezda	May 20, 2016	July 3, 2016	Final roster cut
Rade Zagorac	(Serbia) Mega Leks	May 20, 2016	July 3, 2016	Final roster cut
Milan Mačvan	(Italy) Olimpia Milano	May 20, 2016	July 3, 2016	Injured

== Exhibition games ==
21 June 2016
20:30

Report

France	77–79	Serbia
Scoring by quarter: 21–17, 19–17, 22–21, 15–24
Pts: Diaw 14; Rebs: not available Asts: not available		Pts: Bogdanović 24; Rebs: not available Asts: not available

Bercy Arena, Paris
Attendance: not available
Referees: not available

25 June 2016
21:00

Report

Serbia	94–88 (OT)	France
Scoring by quarter: 13–14, 21–22, 23–22, 24–23, Overtime: 13–7
Pts: Raduljica 17; Rebs: Jokić 9 Asts: Raduljica 5		Pts: de Colo 16; Rebs: not available Asts: not available

Kombank Arena, Belgrade
Attendance: 12,000
Referees: Milivoje Jovčić, Uroš Obrknežević, Aleksandar Glišić.

28 June 2016
20:15

Report

Serbia	91–76	Greece
Scoring by quarter: 27–29, 26–17, 22–17, 16–13
Pts: Jokić 20; Rebs: Jokić 5 Asts: not available		Pts: Antetokounmpo 14; Rebs: Bourousis 6 Asts: not available

Kombank Arena, Belgrade
Attendance: 18,000
Referees: not available

== Tournament ==
=== Preliminary round – Group A ===
All times are local (UTC+2).

Pos	Team	Pld	W	L	PF	PA	PD	Pts	Qualification
1	Serbia (H)	2	2	0	170	141	+29	4	Semifinals
2	Puerto Rico	2	1	1	172	168	+4	3	Semifinals
3	Angola	2	0	2	141	174	−33	2	

Source: FIBA
Rules for classification: 1) Points; 2) Head-to-head results; 3) Points difference; 4) Points scored.
(H) Hosts

Semifinals
8 July
Serbia	96
Czech Republic	72
8 July
Latvia	70
Puerto Rico	77

Final
9 July
Serbia	108
Puerto Rico	77

==== Puerto Rico ====
4 July 2016
21:00

Boxscore

Serbia	87–81	Puerto Rico
Scoring by quarter: 21–22, 20–9, 28–20, 18–30
Pts: Nedović 14; Rebs: Jokić 8 Asts: Teodosić 6		Pts: Holland 21; Rebs: Ramos 7 Asts: Barea 3

Kombank Arena, Belgrade
Attendance: 13,872
Referees: Daniel Hierrezuelo (ESP), Joseph Bissang (FRA), Michael Weiland (CAN)

==== Angola ====
6 July 2016
18:00

Boxscore

Angola	60–83	Serbia
Scoring by quarter: 23–30, 15–17, 13–22, 9–14
Pts: Moore 10; Rebs: Fernandes 6 Asts: Domingos, Santos 2		Pts: Jokić 17; Rebs: Jokić 6 Asts: Bogdanović 8

Kombank Arena, Belgrade
Attendance: 10,422
Referees: Joseph Bissang (FRA), Carmelo Paternico (ITA), Fernando Rocha (POR)

=== Knockout round ===
==== Semifinal – Czech Republic ====
8 July 2016
21:00

Boxscore

Serbia	96–72	Czech Republic
Scoring by quarter: 26–17, 19–19, 28–22, 23–14
Pts: Bogdanović 21; Rebs: Bogdanović, Jokić 8 Asts: Raduljica, Teodosić 6		Pts: Satoranský 14; Rebs: Satoranský 7 Asts: Satoranský 7

Kombank Arena, Belgrade
Attendance: 12,793
Referees: Daniel Hierrezuelo (ESP), Fernando Rocha (POR), Emin Moğulkoç (TUR)

==== Final – Puerto Rico ====
9 July 2016
21:00

Boxscore

Serbia	108–77	Puerto Rico
Scoring by quarter: 37–11, 23–16, 22–29, 26–21
Pts: Bogdanović 26; Rebs: Jokić 8 Asts: Bogdanović 8		Pts: Barea 22; Rebs: Huertas, Vassallo 4 Asts: Arroyo 6

Kombank Arena, Belgrade
Attendance: 17,123
Referees: Daniel Hierrezuelo (ESP), Joseph Bissang (FRA), Michael Weiland (CAN)

== See also ==
- 2016 Serbia men's Olympic basketball team
