= 2020 Serbia men's OQT basketball team =

Serbian basketball team

Serbia
- Flag of Serbia
- President: Predrag Danilović
- Head coach: Igor Kokoškov
- Preliminary round: Winners
- Playoffs: Runners-up
- PIR leader: Filip Petrušev 19.0
- Scoring leader: Filip Petrušev 15.5
- Rebounding leader: Boban Marjanović 7.0
- Assists leader: Miloš Teodosić 6.8
- Biggest win: +18; 94–76 Dominican Rep. (29 June 2021); 102–84 Puerto Rico (3 July 2021)
- Biggest defeat: -7; 95–102 Italy (4 July 2021)
- All statistics correct as of July 5, 2021.

The 2020 Serbia men's OQT basketball team represented Serbia at the 2020 FIBA Men's Olympic Qualifying Tournament in Belgrade, Serbia in June and July 2021. The team coached by Igor Kokoškov and led by team captain Miloš Teodosić failed to qualify for the 2020 Summer Olympics.

== Background ==
Serbia were qualified for the Qualification tournament by taking the 5th place at the 2019 FIBA Basketball World Cup. On 15 November 2019, the Basketball Federation of Serbia has awarded the hosting right of one out of four FIBA Men's Olympic Qualifying Tournaments.

On 13 March 2020, FIBA suspended all FIBA competitions considering the situation with the 2020 coronavirus pandemic. On 30 March, the Summer Olympics has been rescheduled to 2021 due to the same reason. On 9 April, FIBA announced that the Men's Olympic Qualifying Tournaments are rescheduled to 2021.

The Serbia roster entered the Qualification tournament four months after the end of the EuroBasket 2022 qualification where they finished with the first place in Group E with a 4–2 record and got qualified for EuroBasket 2022.

== Timeline ==
- ~~23–28 June 2020: Olympic Qualifying Tournament~~
- 31 May 2021: 25-player preliminary roster announcement
- 12 June 2021: The players gathering in Belgrade
- 18–23 June 2021: Exhibition games
- 27 June 2021: 12-man roster announcement
- 29 June–4 July 2021: Olympic Qualifying Tournament

== Roster ==
On 31 May 2021, head coach Igor Kokoškov announced a 25-man preliminary roster for the Olympic Qualifying Tournament. The 25-man roster includes six NBA players: guard Bogdan Bogdanović, forwards Nemanja Bjelica, Aleksej Pokuševski, and Alen Smailagić, as well as centers Nikola Jokić and Boban Marjanović; then two All-EuroLeague Team members for the 2020–21 season: guard Vasilije Micić and forward Vladimir Lučić; as well as six domestic league players. Furthermore, the roster includes three high-profile-leagues regular season MVPs for the 2020–21 season: Jokić (NBA), Micić (EuroLeague), and Miloš Teodosić (EuroCup).

Center Jokić announced his withdrawal on 16 June, stating that his "body condition requires a longer absence from the court to recover". On the same day, head coach Kokoškov announced withdrawals of two more NBA players, Pokuševski and Smailagić. Also, coach Kokoškov said the guards Micić and Teodosić and forwards Lučić and Nikola Kalinić will rest during the Acropolis Tournament. Guard Nemanja Nedović will skip the Olympic Qualifying Tournament due to injury. Furthermore, guards Marko Gudurić, Ognjen Jaramaz, forward Lučić and the 2019 World Cup team captain Miroslav Raduljica were also cut out from the roster due to injuries.

On 27 June, head coach Kokoškov announced the 12-man final roster for the Olympic Qualifying Tournament. In the end, forward Branko Lazić and center Nikola Milutinov was cut from the roster due to health issues while guard Vanja Marinković and the Bosnian-born forward Dalibor Ilić did not make it to the final roster. On 30 June, guard Stefan Jović got a soleus muscle injury in the second game and will miss the rest of the tournament.

The average height of players in the roster is 2.01 metres (6 ft 7 in) which makes the Serbians the tallest roster in the Belgrade Tournament. Standing at 2.22 metres (7 ft 3 in), center Marjanović is the tallest player in the tournament. The average age of the players in the Serbia roster is 29 years old.

The following is the Serbia roster in the Olympic Qualifying Tournament.

Serbia national basketball team – 2020 FIBA Men's Olympic Qualifying Tournament roster
Players
Coaches

Pos.	No.	Name	Age – Date of birth	Height	Club	Ctr.
C	3	Filip Petrušev	21 – 15 April 2000	2.10 m (6 ft 11 in)	Mega Basket	(Serbia)
PG	4	Miloš Teodosić (C)	34 – 19 March 1987	1.95 m (6 ft 5 in)	Virtus Bologna	(Italy)
PF	8	Nemanja Bjelica	33 – 9 May 1988	2.09 m (6 ft 10 in)	Miami Heat	(United States)
SF	10	Nikola Kalinić	29 – 8 November 1991	2.02 m (6 ft 8 in)	Valencia	(Spain)
SG	12	Dragan Milosavljević	32 – 11 May 1989	1.98 m (6 ft 6 in)	Mega Basket	(Serbia)
G	22	Vasilije Micić	27 – 13 January 1994	1.95 m (6 ft 5 in)	Anadolu Efes	(Turkey)
PG	24	Stefan Jović (injured)	30 – 3 November 1990	1.96 m (6 ft 5 in)	Khimki	(Russia)
SF	27	Dejan Davidovac	26 – 17 January 1995	2.03 m (6 ft 8 in)	Crvena zvezda	(Serbia)
PG	30	Aleksa Avramović	26 – 25 October 1994	1.92 m (6 ft 4 in)	Estudiantes	(Spain)
SG	31	Ognjen Dobrić	26 – 27 October 1994	1.98 m (6 ft 6 in)	Crvena zvezda	(Serbia)
SF	33	Danilo Anđušić	30 – 22 April 1991	1.95 m (6 ft 5 in)	JL Bourg	(France)
C	51	Boban Marjanović	32 – 15 August 1988	2.22 m (7 ft 3 in)	Dallas Mavericks	(United States)

Head coach

- (Serbia) Igor Kokoškov

Assistant coach(es)

- (Serbia) Jovica Antonić
- (Serbia) Dejan Milojević
- (Serbia) Vladimir Jovanović

Legend

- (C) Team captain
- Club – describes last
  club before the tournament
- Age – describes age
  on 29 June 2021

=== Depth chart ===
Pos.	Starting 5	Bench 1	Bench 2	Injured
C	Boban Marjanović	Filip Petrušev
PF	Nemanja Bjelica	Dejan Davidovac
SF	Danilo Anđušić	Nikola Kalinić
SG	Ognjen Dobrić	Aleksa Avramović	Dragan Milosavljević
PG	Vasilije Micić	Miloš Teodosić		Stefan Jović

=== Earlier candidates ===
The following were candidates to make the team:

Player	Team (Note: Team at the time player was a candidate)	Added	Removed	Reason
Miroslav Raduljica	(China) Zhejiang Lions	31 May 2021	14 June 2021	Injured
Bogdan Bogdanović	(United States) Atlanta Hawks	31 May 2021	14 June 2021	NBA playoffs (Note: There is a conflict between NBA schedule and the Serbia team training camp.)
Nikola Jokić	(United States) Denver Nuggets	31 May 2021	16 June 2021	Withdrew
Aleksej Pokuševski	(United States) Oklahoma City Thunder	31 May 2021	16 June 2021	Withdrew
Alen Smailagić	(United States) Golden State Warriors	31 May 2021	16 June 2021	Withdrew
Nemanja Nedović	(Greece) Panathinaikos	31 May 2021	21 June 2021	Injured
Marko Gudurić	(Turkey) Fenerbahce	31 May 2021	21 June 2021	Injured
Ognjen Jaramaz	(Serbia) Partizan	31 May 2021	21 June 2021	Injured
Vladimir Lučić	(Germany) Bayern Munich	31 May 2021	23 June 2021	Injured
Branko Lazić	(Serbia) Crvena zvezda mts	31 May 2021	27 June 2021	Health issues
Nikola Milutinov	(Russia) CSKA Moscow	31 May 2021	27 June 2021	Health issues
Vanja Marinković	(Spain) Valencia	31 May 2021	27 June 2021	12-man roster cut
Dalibor Ilić	(Bosnia and Herzegovina) Igokea	31 May 2021	27 June 2021	12-man roster cut

== Staff ==
At the end of the 2019 FIBA Basketball World Cup where Serbia won 5th place, head coach Aleksandar Đorđević announced his decision to leave the position after six years. On 20 November 2019, the Basketball Federation of Serbia named Igor Kokoškov the new head coach of the Serbia team. In December, Dejan Milojević and Vladimir Jovanović were named assistant coaches. On 15 January 2020, the Federation added the Denver Nuggets head coach Michael Malone to the coaching staff for the Olympic Qualifying Tournament. In May 2021, Kokoškov added conditioning coach Marko Sekulić to his coaching staff. In June 2021, Aleksandar Matović was added to the staff as a player development coach. As of June 2021, the Nuggets head coach Malone did not join the Serbia staff as it was announced.

Position	Staff Member	Age	Affiliated Club (Note: Describes club on 29 June 2021.)
Head coach	Igor Kokoškov	49	(Turkey) Fenerbahçe
Assistant coaches	Dejan Milojević	44	None
Assistant coaches	Vladimir Jovanović	37	(Croatia) Cibona
Assistant coaches	Jovica Antonić	54	(Serbia) Konstantin
Conditioning coach	Marko Sekulić	41	(Serbia) Mega Soccerbet
Scout	Bogdan Karaičić	36	(Serbia) Mega Soccerbet
Team manager	Nebojša Ilić	53	(Serbia) Crvena zvezda mts
Physicians	Dragan Radovanović	—N/a	None
Physicians	Milan Mirković	—N/a	None
Physicians	Branislav Krivokapić	—N/a	(Serbia) Partizan NIS
Physiotherapists	Dušan Sajić	—N/a	None
Physiotherapists	Velibor Kosanović	—N/a	None
Equipment manager	Jovica Aničić	—N/a	None
Player development coach	Aleksandar Matović	43	(Serbia) Partizan NIS

Age – describes age on 29 June 2021

Source: KSS

== Uniform ==
- Supplier: Peak
- Main sponsor: Triglav
- Back sponsor: Raiffeisen Bank (below number)
- Shorts sponsor: mts

Home	Away

== Exhibition games ==
The Serbia roster played four exhibition games and went undefeated at 4–0. The team played at the 2021 Acropolis of Athens Tournament together with Greece, Puerto Rico and Mexico from 18–20 June 2021. They won the Acropolis Tournament for the second time after went undefeated at 3–0. Afterwards, Serbia won one more game over Mexico in Belgrade on 23 June.

18 June 2021
17:00 (EEST)

Report

Serbia	80–68	Puerto Rico
Scoring by quarter: 19–21, 28–11, 13–14, 20–22
Pts: Filip Petrušev 21; Rebs: Nemanja Bjelica 12; Asts: Avramović, Bjelica 5 each		Pts: Gary Browne 19; Rebs: George Conditt 7 Asts: Iván Gandía 4

O.A.C.A. Olympic Hall, Marousi, Athens
Attendance: not available
Referees: Symeonidis, Psarianos, Magklogiannis

19 June 2021
17:00 (EEST)

Report

Mexico	67–104	Serbia
Scoring by quarter: 20–27, 15–24, 13–34, 19–19
Pts: Omar De Haro 11; Rebs: Fabián Jaimes 13; Asts: Paul Stoll 4		Pts: Filip Petrušev 23; Rebs: Filip Petrušev 9 Asts: Avramović, Milosavljević 5 each

O.A.C.A. Olympic Hall, Marousi, Athens
Attendance: not available
Referees: Petros Papapetrou, Nikolaos Tziopanos, Emmanouil Tsolakos

20 June 2021
20:00 (EEST)

Report

Greece	64–75	Serbia
Scoring by quarter: 21–19, 13–18, 11–23, 19–15
Pts: Dinos Mitoglou 17; Rebs: Dinos Mitoglou 10; Asts: Michalis Lountzis 4		Pts: Avramović, Dobrić 18 each Rebs: Nemanja Bjelica 11; Asts: Bjelica, Jović 5 each

O.A.C.A. Olympic Hall, Marousi, Athens
Attendance: not available
Referees: Ilias Koromilas, Anastasios Manos, Nikolaos Somos

23 June 2021
20:00 (CEST)

Boxscore

Serbia	81–77	Mexico
Scoring by quarter: 17–21, 28–22, 18–14, 18–20
Pts: Boban Marjanović 20; Rebs: Boban Marjanović 9 Asts: Stefan Jović 6		Pts: Orlando Méndez 18; Rebs: Fabián Jaimes 10; Asts: Paul Stoll 4

Aleksandar Nikolić Hall, Belgrade
Attendance: 200
Referees: Aleksandar Glišić, Vladimir Jevtović, Nemanja Ninković

== Tournament ==
The draw was held on 27 November 2019 in Mies, Switzerland. Serbia was drawn into the Belgrade Tournament Group with the Dominican Republic, New Zealand, Puerto Rico, Italy, and Senegal. These matches were originally scheduled to take place between 23 June and 28 June 2020 in Aleksandar Nikolić Hall, Belgrade, but was postponed due to the COVID-19 pandemic, to 29 June to 4 July 2021. Teams are divided into two groups. Serbia was drawn into Group A with the Dominican Republic and New Zealand.

If Serbia finishes as one of the top two teams in its group, they will advance to the final round of the Belgrade Tournament and will play against one of the top two finishers of Group B, which is composed of Puerto Rico, Italy, and Senegal.

On 26 February 2021, Basketball New Zealand announced that they will pull out of the tournament. On the same day, FIBA announced that they will be replaced by the Philippines as the next best team from the Asia-Oceania region in FIBA World Rankings. On 28 June, Senegal canceled their participation in the tournament due to COVID-19 outbreak in their roster so they will be fortified 0–20 in both scheduled games of Group B.

The winning team of this tournament will qualify for the 2020 Summer Olympics in Tokyo, Japan.

=== Preliminary round ===
Pos	Team	Pld	W	L	PF	PA	PD	Pts	Qualification
1	Serbia (H)	2	2	0	177	152	+25	4	Semi-finals
2	Dominican Republic	2	1	1	170	161	+9	3	Semi-finals
3	Philippines	2	0	2	143	177	−34	2	

Source: FIBA
Rules for classification: 1) points; 2) head-to-head points; 3) head-to-head points difference; 4) head-to-head number of points scored.
(H) Hosts

All times are local UTC+2.

==== Dominican Republic ====
The game was originally scheduled for 23 June 2020, and rescheduled due to the COVID-19 pandemic.

29 June 2021
20:15

Boxscore

Dominican Republic	76–94	Serbia
Scoring by quarter: 23–31, 24–16, 19–20, 10–27
Pts: Liz, Torres 16 each Rebs: Víctor Liz 9 Asts: Solano, Torres 4 each		Pts: Boban Marjanović 18; Rebs: Boban Marjanović 10; Asts: Miloš Teodosić 6

Aleksandar Nikolić Hall, Belgrade
Attendance: 1,500
Referees: Guilherme Locatelli (BRA), Mārtiņš Kozlovskis (LAT), Georgios Poursanidis (GRE)

The Serbia roster finished strong at the opener, beating the Dominican Republic 94–76. While the Serbians had a bit of a point cushion at the end, it wasn't an easy win at all.

Serbia entered the game in a dunk mode, with six of the first ten points coming by throw-downs from Boban Marjanović, Ognjen Dobrić, and Nemanja Bjelica for an early 10–2 lead. But the Dominicans answered back. Led by Víctor Liz and Gelvis Solano, they came back and then took the first lead of the game two minutes before the halftime, 46–45, before it was all tied up 47–47 after a very intense first half. With the third quarter coming to a close, the Serbians raised their game up a notch as they carried this momentum into the fourth where they found their best defense, energy, and offensive rhythm. The turning point was a zone defensive scheme by Serbia's head coach Igor Kokoškov at the start of the final quarter helped his team buckle down for a 9–0 run. From then on, Serbia took an advantage they would only increase until the final buzzer. Outscoring the Dominican Republic 27–10 over the final ten minutes of the game gives them some level of confidence going forward in the tournament. Center Marjanović finished with a double-double, recording 18 points and 10 rebounds for a total efficiency plus-minus score of 27. He was 7-of-12 in the paint and 4-of-4 from the line. Center Filip Petrušev added 17 points of the bench, and guard Vasilije Micić recorded 16 points and five assists. As expected, Serbia dominated the points from the paint 58–24 but didn't take advantage in rebounding as maybe was a plan (43–37). Fast break points also played a significant role, as the "Eagles" picked up 24 of them, mainly in the fourth quarter, compared to just nine from the Dominicans.

==== Philippines ====
The game was originally scheduled for 24 June 2020, and rescheduled due to the COVID-19 pandemic. This will be the second competitive game between Serbia and the Philippines. Previously, Serbia had a 126–67 won over the Philippines at the 2019 FIBA Basketball World Cup in China on 2 September 2019.

30 June 2021
20:15

Boxscore

Serbia	83–76	Philippines
Scoring by quarter: 22–16, 23–18, 22–28, 16–14
Pts: Boban Marjanović 25; Rebs: Boban Marjanović 11; Asts: Miloš Teodosić 6		Pts: Angelo Kouame 17; Rebs: Angelo Kouame 7 Asts: S. J. Belangel 6

Aleksandar Nikolić Hall, Belgrade
Attendance: 1,500
Referees: Yohan Rosso (FRA), Omar Bermudez (MEX), James Alexander Boyer (AUS)

Serbia grabbed a vital 83–76 win over the Philippines. Serbia needed a thrilling finish to withstand the "Gilas" but the victory nonetheless sees the reigning Olympic silver medalists into the Belgrade Olympic Qualifying Tournament as the first-place team from Group A to advance to the Semi-Finals.

The Serbia side was in front from the tip-off till the R. J. Abarrientos lay-up at 3:50 to go in the fourth quarter, but on the wings of Boban Marjanović's dominance in the paint, his team finds a way out. Serbia head coach Igor Kokoškov decided to rest three players from starting a previous line-up due to minor injuries (Nemanja Bjelica, Nikola Kalinić, and Vasilije Micić). But, a massive problem for the home team occurred in the middle of the fourth quarter, when Stefan Jović helped to leave the floor. After leading the for 36 minutes, Serbia allowed the Gilas to take their first and only lead of the game, 74–73. But, in a similar fashion to Serbia's tournament opening game the previous night, they found a way to win it by closing with a 10–2 run. After a fantastic season in his club Crvena zvezda mts, Ognjen Dobrić continued his growth in a national team jersey, putting up 16 points while going 4-from-7 from the three point line. Center Marjanović also showed off his double-double stats mode with 25 points and 11 rebounds. Center Angelo Kouame shined in the Philippines team with 17 points and 7 rebounds. After a poor three-point shooting night against the Dominican Republic in the tournament opener, the "Eagles" found some rhythm out of the line, scoring 9 from 26 shots. Also, Serbians have a massive advantage over rivals in the points from the paint, 46–28.

=== Final round ===
Serbia finished as the group winner in its preliminary group and advanced to the semi-finals of the 2020 FIBA Men's Olympic Qualifying Tournament in Belgrade and played against the runner-up of Group B, which will be Puerto Rico, on 3 July.

All times are local UTC+2.

==== Semi-final: Win over Puerto Rico ====
Serbia and Puerto Rico previously met on multiple occasions. Serbia won over Puerto Rico at the 2016 Olympic Qualifying Tournament Final in Belgrade, as well at the 2019 World Cup in China. Most recent, Serbia had an 80–68 win over Puerto Rico at the Acropolis Tournament on 18 June.

3 July 2021
16:00

Report

Serbia	102–84	Puerto Rico
Scoring by quarter: 28–26, 23–14, 28–28, 23–16
Pts: Vasilije Micić 21; Rebs: Filip Petrušev 8 Asts: Miloš Teodosić 10		Pts: Isaiah Piñeiro 23; Rebs: Gary Browne 5 Asts: Gary Browne 10

Aleksandar Nikolić Hall, Belgrade
Attendance: 2,388
Referees: Yohan Rosso (FRA), Omar Bermúdez (MEX), Yener Yılmaz (TUR)

After two lukewarm games to start the tournament, Serbia needed to receive a place in the Olympic 12-team tournament. Nemanja Bjelica's three-pointer to beat the first-quarter buzzer saw Serbia take a 28–26 lead. Puerto Rico's side started the game with intensity and aggression that led to a pretty solid first quarter. Then came Bjelica' early dagger dime and the Serbians team took control thereafter, finding a strong offensive rhythm. The numbers of assisted points started to rise to the tune of 30 assists and 12 triples. Guard Vasilije Micić continued to play his MVP basketball after one game of rest. He scored 23 points and dished 8 assists. Forward Bjelica also stepped up, contributing with 18 points and 8 rebounds. Guard Miloš Teodosić led the team in assists with 10.

The victory puts the defending Olympic silver medalists into the Sunday Final where they will face Italy.

==== The Final: Lost to Italy ====
4 July 2021
20:30

Boxscore

Serbia	95–102	Italy
Scoring by quarter: 22–28, 23–29, 18–23, 32–22
Pts: Danilo Anđušić 27; Rebs: Nikola Kalinić 6 Asts: Kalinić, Teodosić 5		Pts: Nico Mannion 24; Rebs: Achille Polonara 12; Asts: Alessandro Pajola 6

Aleksandar Nikolić Hall, Belgrade
Attendance: not available
Referees: Guilherme Locatelli (BRA), Yohan Rosso (FRA), Mārtiņš Kozlovskis (LAT)

The Italian roster will play this summer at the Tokyo 2020 men's basketball Olympic tournament with their 102–95 victory over Serbia in the FIBA Olympic qualifying tournament final. Relying on three-point shooting as the Italians earned their first Olympics appearance since the 2004 Athens Games, where they won the silver medal. Italian made use of long range shooting in Belgrade as they made 14 three-pointers.

The Italians relied on two of them, actually. The first was at the start of the game where they were able to stretch Serbia's defense, which paid off as the Italian's triple-point shots were falling. It was crowned with 25–9 to finish the first half after trailing by four (36–32 to 45–57). The second came with another precise shooting run in the second half that stopped Serbia from mounting an early comeback. The boys in blue played outstanding team basketball in the Final. The "Azzurri" also benefited from a career game from Achille Polonara. His two-way, double-double performance of 22 points and 12 rebounds earned him a total efficiency score of 32. Polonara was justly awarded the MVP Award following his team receiving their cardboard cutout ticket to Tokyo. Romeo Sacchetti's squad outrebounded the home team by small (39–36), but took 12 of them in the offensive end. And while most of the statistics were on Serbia's side in the end, the key was the fantastic shooting performance by the "Azzuri" team: 48 percent for 2 points, 41 percent for 3 point.

Starters:			Pts	Reb	Ast
PG	30	Aleksa Avramović	2	5	3
SG	31	Ognjen Dobrić	17	3	4
SF	33	Danilo Anđušić	27	2	3
PF	8	Nemanja Bjelica	5	4	0
C	51	Boban Marjanović	7	3	0
Reserves:					
C	3	Filip Petrušev	22	5	1
PG	4	Miloš Teodosić	5	3	5
SF	10	Nikola Kalinić	2	6	5
SG	12	Dragan Milosavljević	DNP		
PG	22	Vasilije Micić	8	0	2
PG	24	Stefan Jović	DNP		
PF	27	Dejan Davidovac	DNP		
Head coach:
Igor Kokoškov

Serbia	Italy

SRB	Statistics	ITA
18/27 (66.7%)	2-pt field goals	20/42 (47.6%)
11/32 (34.4%)	3-pt field goals	14/34 (41.2%)
26/32 (81.2%)	Free throws	20/23 (87.0%)
9	Offensive rebounds	15
27	Defensive rebounds	24
36	Total rebounds	38
23	Assists	17
11	Turnovers	8
5	Steals	7
5	Blocks	2
24	Fouls	24

Starters:			Pts	Reb	Ast
PG	1	Nico Mannion	24	0	4
SG	7	Stefano Tonut	15	4	4
SF	13	Simone Fontecchio	21	8	0
PF	33	Achille Polonara	22	12	2
C	9	Nicolò Melli	5	4	0
Reserves:					
PG	0	Marco Spissu	DNP		
C	16	Amedeo Tessitori	2	2	1
PF	17	Giampaolo Ricci	3	0	0
SF	23	Awudu Abass	DNP		
SF	24	Riccardo Moraschini	0	0	0
SG	31	Michele Vitali	0	0	0
PG	54	Alessandro Pajola	10	4	6
Head coach:
Romeo Sacchetti

== Statistics ==
=== Player statistics ===
Legend
GP	Games played	GS	Games started	MPG	Minutes per game
FG%	Field-goal percentage	3FG%	3-point field-goal percentage	FT%	Free-throw percentage
RPG	Rebounds per game	APG	Assists per game	SPG	Steals per game
BPG	Blocks per game	PPG	Points per game	EF	PIR per game

Player	GP	GS	MPG	FG%	3FG%	FT%	RPG	APG	SPG	BPG	PPG	EF
Danilo Anđušić	4	3	24.0	.625	.545	.900	2.5	1.5	0.0	0.3	15.3	15.0
Aleksa Avramović	4	1	16.8	.267	.000	.000	2.5	2.3	0.8	0.3	2.0	3.8
Nemanja Bjelica	3	3	24.6	.444	.412	.667	5.7	0.7	1.0	1.0	11.7	13.0
Dejan Davidovac	3	1	9.7	.300	.000	1.000	1.0	1.7	0.7	0.3	2.3	3.7
Ognjen Dobrić	4	4	28.4	.460	.462	.786	2.3	2.8	0.3	0.8	11.3	13.3
Stefan Jović	2	1	22.9	.333	.000	.000	5.0	3.5	0.5	0.0	2.0	7.0
Nikola Kalinić	2	1	20.8	.444	.000	.750	6.5	5.0	1.0	0.0	5.5	13.5
Boban Marjanović	4	4	18.5	.615	1.000	.750	7.0	1.0	0.8	0.3	13.8	17.5
Vasilije Micić	3	3	22.7	.481	.364	.833	1.7	5.0	0.3	0.0	15.0	15.0
Dragan Milosavljević	2	0	8.6	.250	.000	1.000	1.5	0.5	0.0	0.0	3.0	1.5
Filip Petrušev	4	0	19.6	.769	.000	.733	5.0	0.8	0.8	1.0	15.5	19.0
Miloš Teodosić	4	0	23.9	.344	.320	.833	2.0	6.8	0.3	0.0	8.8	9.3
Total	4	4	200.0	.504	.365	.788	36.8	25.0	5.0	3.5	93.5	112.5

Last updated: July 4, 2021.
Source: OQT Serbia

== See also ==
- 2016 Serbia OQT basketball team
- 2020 Italy men's OQT basketball team
