= Basketball at the 2016 Summer Olympics – Men's tournament =

Tournament details
- Host country: Brazil
- City: Rio de Janeiro
- Dates: 6–21 August 2016
- Teams: 12 (from 5 confederations)
- Venue: Carioca Arena 1

Final positions
- Champions: United States (15th title)
- Runners-up: Serbia
- Third place: Spain
- Fourth place: Australia

Tournament statistics
- Games played: 38
- Top scorer: (Croatia) Bojan Bogdanović (25.3 points per game)

The men's basketball tournament at the 2016 Summer Olympics in Rio de Janeiro, began on 6 August and ended on 21 August. The gold medal game in this discipline was the final competitive event before the Closing Ceremony. The United States won their fifteenth gold medal, after defeating Serbia, 96–66, in the gold medal match, which was the largest margin of victory in a gold medal game since the 1992 Summer Olympics. Spain won the bronze medal, after an 89–88 win over Australia. The medals were presented by Patrick Baumann of Switzerland, Dr. René Fasel of Switzerland, Kirsty Coventry of Zimbabwe, and members of the International Olympic Committee, while the gifts were presented by Horacio Muratore, the President of FIBA, Hamine Niang, the first vice-president of FIBA, and Jerry Colangelo, the chairman of USA Basketball.

== Competition schedule ==
G	Group stage	¼	Quarter-finals	½	Semi-finals	B	Bronze medal match	F	Final

Sat 6	Sun 7	Mon 8	Tue 9	Wed 10	Thu 11	Fri 12	Sat 13	Sun 14	Mon 15	Tue 16	Wed 17	Thu 18	Fri 19	Sat 20	Sun 21	
G	G	G	G	G	G	G	G	G	G		¼		½		B	F

== Qualification ==
Means of qualification	Date	Venue	Berths	Qualified
2014 FIBA Basketball World Cup	31 August – 14 September 2014	Spain	1	United States
Host nation	9 August 2015	N/A	1	Brazil
2015 FIBA Oceania Championship	15–18 August 2015	Various	1	Australia
AfroBasket 2015	19–30 August 2015	(Tunisia) Radès	1	Nigeria
2015 FIBA Americas Championship	31 August – 12 September 2015	Mexico City	2	Venezuela
2015 FIBA Americas Championship	31 August – 12 September 2015	Mexico City	2	Argentina
EuroBasket 2015	5–20 September 2015	Various	2	Spain
EuroBasket 2015	5–20 September 2015	Various	2	Lithuania
2015 FIBA Asia Championship	23 September – 3 October 2015	(China) Changsha	1	China
2016 FIBA World Olympic Qualifying Tournament – Belgrade	4–10 July 2016	(Serbia) Belgrade	1	Serbia
2016 FIBA World Olympic Qualifying Tournament – Manila	4–10 July 2016	(Philippines) Pasay	1	France
2016 FIBA World Olympic Qualifying Tournament – Turin	4–10 July 2016	(Italy) Turin	1	Croatia
Total			12	

== Squads ==
Each NOC was limited to one team per tournament. Each team had a roster of twelve players, one of which could be a naturalized player.

== Referees ==
The following referees were selected for the tournament.

- (Angola) Carlos Júlio
- (Argentina) Leandro Lezcano
- (Australia) Scott Beker
- (Australia) Vaughan Mayberry
- (Brazil) Guilherme Locatelli
- (Brazil) Cristiano Maranho
- (Canada) Karen Lasuik
- (Canada) Stephen Seibel
- (China) Duan Zhu
- (Croatia) Sreten Radović
- (Dominican Republic) Natalia Cuello
- (France) Eddie Viator
- (Germany) Robert Lottermoser
- (Germany) Anne Panther
- (Greece) Christos Christodoulou
- (Ivory Coast) Nadege Zouzou
- (South Korea) Hwang In-tae
- (Latvia) Oļegs Latiševs
- (Mexico) José Reyes
- (Morocco) Chahinaz Boussetta
- (Oman) Ahmed Al-Bulushi
- (Philippines) Ferdinand Pascual
- (Poland) Piotr Pastusiak
- (Puerto Rico) Roberto Vázquez
- (Serbia) Ilija Belošević
- (Slovenia) Damir Javor
- (Spain) Juan Carlos García
- (Spain) Carlos Peruga
- (Ukraine) Borys Ryzhyk
- (United States) Steven Anderson

== Draw ==
The draw was held at the FIBA Headquarters, also known as the "House of Basketball" in Mies, Switzerland, on 11 March 2016. As the three winners of the 2016 FIBA World Olympic Qualifying Tournaments for Men (OQT) were yet to be known, they were assigned placeholders as "OQT 1", "OQT 2" and "OQT 3". These were the pot assignments:

Pot 1	Pot 2	Pot 3	Pot 4	Pot 5	Pot 6
United States; Spain	Venezuela; Argentina	Nigeria; China	Australia; Brazil	Lithuania; OQT 1	OQT 2 OQT 3

Group A was assigned with OQT 1 and OQT 2, while Group B had OQT 3.

After the World Olympic Qualifying Tournament on 10 July 2016, another draw was held at the Mall of Asia Arena in Pasay, Philippines, to determine which among the teams would be assigned to which group. This was a straight draw: there were two pots containing three balls each. One pot had the names of the teams that won the Olympic Qualifying Tournaments (OQT), while the other pot had the name of the placeholders.

Team	Placeholder	Group
France	OQT 1	Group A
Serbia	OQT 2	Group A
Croatia	OQT 3	Group B

== Group stage ==
All times are local (UTC−3).

=== Group A ===
Pos	Team	Pld	W	L	PF	PA	PD	Pts	Qualification
1	United States	5	5	0	524	407	+117	10	Quarterfinals
2	Australia	5	4	1	444	368	+76	9	Quarterfinals
3	France	5	3	2	423	378	+45	8	Quarterfinals
4	Serbia	5	2	3	426	387	+39	7	Quarterfinals
5	Venezuela	5	1	4	315	444	−129	6	
6	China	5	0	5	318	466	−148	5	

Source: FIBA
Rules for classification: 1) points; 2) head-to-head points; 3) head-to-head points difference; 4) head-to-head number of points scored.

6 August 2016
14:15

Boxscore

Australia	87–66	France
Scoring by quarter: 20–14, 16–19, 25–15, 26–18
Pts: Mills 21; Rebs: Baynes 8 Asts: Dellavedova 10		Pts: Parker 18; Rebs: Gobert 6 Asts: Diaw, Heurtel 3

Carioca Arena 1, Rio de Janeiro
Attendance: 8,719
Referees: Cristiano Maranho (BRA), Steven Anderson (USA), Ferdinand Pascual (PHI)

6 August 2016
19:00

Boxscore

China	62–119	United States
Scoring by quarter: 10–30, 20–29, 17–32, 15–28
Pts: Yi 25; Rebs: Yi, Zhao 6 Asts: Zhao 5		Pts: Durant 25; Rebs: Anthony, Jordan 7 Asts: Durant 6

Carioca Arena 1, Rio de Janeiro
Attendance: 10,622
Referees: Stephen Seibel (CAN), Oļegs Latiševs (LAT), Sreten Radović (CRO)

6 August 2016
22:30

Boxscore

Venezuela	62–86	Serbia
Scoring by quarter: 14–18, 9–26, 18–24, 21–18
Pts: Echenique 12; Rebs: Colmenares 6 Asts: Vargas 5		Pts: Bogdanović 19; Rebs: Štimac 9 Asts: Nedović 4

Carioca Arena 1, Rio de Janeiro
Attendance: 5,063
Referees: Christos Christodoulou (GRE), Duan Zhu (CHN), Roberto Vázquez (PUR)

8 August 2016
14:15

Boxscore

Serbia	80–95	Australia
Scoring by quarter: 23–26, 20–14, 20–22, 17–33
Pts: Raduljica 25; Rebs: Bogdanović 8 Asts: Marković 4		Pts: Mills 26; Rebs: Bogut 12; Asts: Dellavedova 13

Carioca Arena 1, Rio de Janeiro
Attendance: 5,409
Referees: Cristiano Maranho (BRA), Borys Ryzhyk (UKR), Guilherme Locatelli (BRA)

8 August 2016
19:00

Boxscore

United States	113–69	Venezuela
Scoring by quarter: 18–18, 30–8, 27–25, 38–18
Pts: George 20; Rebs: Jordan 9 Asts: Lowry 9		Pts: Cox 19; Rebs: Echenique 7 Asts: Vargas 5

Carioca Arena 1, Rio de Janeiro
Attendance: 10,572
Referees: Eddie Viator (FRA), Damir Javor (SLO), Scott Beker (AUS)

8 August 2016
22:30

Boxscore

France	88–60	China
Scoring by quarter: 19–14, 23–9, 22–22, 24–15
Pts: de Colo 19; Rebs: Batum 10; Asts: Parker 8		Pts: Yi 19; Rebs: Yi 6 Asts: Ding, Guo 4

Carioca Arena 1, Rio de Janeiro
Attendance: 6,360
Referees: Juan Carlos García (ESP), Roberto Vázquez (PUR), Piotr Pastusiak (POL)

10 August 2016
14:15

Boxscore

Serbia	75–76	France
Scoring by quarter: 17–26, 19–14, 24–17, 15–19
Pts: Raduljica 16; Rebs: Jokić 7 Asts: Teodosić 9		Pts: de Colo 22; Rebs: Diaw 9 Asts: Diaw 9

Carioca Arena 1, Rio de Janeiro
Attendance: 6,901
Referees: Borys Ryzhyk (UKR), Stephen Seibel (CAN), Oļegs Latiševs (LAT)

10 August 2016
19:00

Boxscore

Australia	88–98	United States
Scoring by quarter: 29–29, 25–20, 13–21, 21–28
Pts: Mills 30; Rebs: Dellavedova 6 Asts: Dellavedova 11		Pts: Anthony 31; Rebs: Anthony, Cousins 8 Asts: Irving 5

Carioca Arena 1, Rio de Janeiro
Attendance: 10,957
Referees: Christos Christodoulou (GRE), Juan Carlos García (ESP), Robert Lottermoser (GER)

10 August 2016
22:30

Boxscore

Venezuela	72–68	China
Scoring by quarter: 25–13, 13–22, 13–15, 21–18
Pts: Colmenares 16; Rebs: Colmenares 5 Asts: Vargas 5		Pts: Guo 17; Rebs: Yi 10; Asts: Guo, Zhou 3

Carioca Arena 1, Rio de Janeiro
Attendance: 6,223
Referees: Cristiano Maranho (BRA), Sreten Radović (CRO), Guilherme Locatelli (BRA)

12 August 2016
14:15

Boxscore

China	68–93	Australia
Scoring by quarter: 14–17, 20–27, 16–21, 18–28
Pts: Yi 20; Rebs: Yi 9 Asts: Guo 5		Pts: Bairstow 17; Rebs: Bairstow 9 Asts: Dellavedova 8

Carioca Arena 1, Rio de Janeiro
Attendance: 7,704
Referees: Roberto Vázquez (PUR), Sreten Radović (CRO), Carlos Peruga (ESP)

12 August 2016
19:00

Boxscore

United States	94–91	Serbia
Scoring by quarter: 27–15, 23–26, 22–21, 22–29
Pts: Irving 15; Rebs: George 9 Asts: Irving, Cousins 5		Pts: Jokić 25; Rebs: Jokić 6 Asts: Teodosić 6

Carioca Arena 1, Rio de Janeiro
Attendance: 11,413
Referees: Stephen Seibel (CAN), Guilherme Locatelli (BRA), Piotr Pastusiak (POL)

12 August 2016
22:30

Boxscore

France	96–56	Venezuela
Scoring by quarter: 23–18, 19–12, 24–17, 30–9
Pts: Lauvergne 17; Rebs: Kahudi 12; Asts: Heurtel 8		Pts: Echenique 12; Rebs: Vargas 7 Asts: Cox 4

Carioca Arena 1, Rio de Janeiro
Attendance: 7,312
Referees: Cristiano Maranho (BRA), Robert Lottermoser (GER), Ferdinand Pascual (PHI)

14 August 2016
14:15

Boxscore

United States	100–97	France
Scoring by quarter: 30–24, 25–22, 26–23, 19–28
Pts: Thompson 30; Rebs: Durant 6 Asts: Irving 12		Pts: de Colo, Heurtel 18; Rebs: Heurtel 8 Asts: Heurtel 9

Carioca Arena 1, Rio de Janeiro
Attendance: 11,302
Referees: Borys Ryzhyk (UKR), José Reyes (MEX), Damir Javor (SLO)

14 August 2016
19:00

Boxscore

Australia	81–56	Venezuela
Scoring by quarter: 16–6, 16–19, 21–18, 28–13
Pts: Goulding 22; Rebs: Broekhoff 8 Asts: Martin 4		Pts: Perez 12; Rebs: Vargas, Ruiz 4 Asts: Vargas 7

Carioca Arena 1, Rio de Janeiro
Attendance: 9,459
Referees: Stephen Seibel (CAN), Sreten Radović (CRO), Carlos Peruga (ESP)

14 August 2016
22:30

Boxscore

Serbia	94–60	China
Scoring by quarter: 24–18, 19–10, 35–15, 16–17
Pts: Bogdanović 19; Rebs: Jokić 7 Asts: Marković, Teodosić 5		Pts: Yi 20; Rebs: Wang 8 Asts: Ailun 8

Carioca Arena 1, Rio de Janeiro
Attendance: 7,367
Referees: Juan García (ESP), Guilherme Locatelli (BRA), Anne Panther (GER)

=== Group B ===
Pos	Team	Pld	W	L	PF	PA	PD	Pts	Qualification
1	Croatia	5	3	2	400	407	−7	8 (Note: In games among the four teams at 3–2, Croatia and Spain were 2–1 while Argentina and Lithuania were 1–2. Croatia beat Spain 72–70, and Lithuania beat Argentina 81–73.)	Quarterfinals
2	Spain	5	3	2	432	357	+75	8	Quarterfinals
3	Lithuania	5	3	2	392	428	−36	8	Quarterfinals
4	Argentina	5	3	2	441	428	+13	8	Quarterfinals
5	Brazil (H)	5	2	3	411	407	+4	7	
6	Nigeria	5	1	4	392	441	−49	6	

Source: FIBA
Rules for classification: 1) points; 2) head-to-head points; 3) head-to-head points difference; 4) head-to-head number of points scored.
(H) Hosts
Notes:

7 August 2016
14:15

Boxscore

Brazil	76–82	Lithuania
Scoring by quarter: 17–27, 12–31, 23–12, 24–12
Pts: Barbosa 21; Rebs: Nenê 8 Asts: Huertas 3		Pts: Kalnietis 16; Rebs: Jankūnas 7 Asts: Kalnietis 8

Carioca Arena 1, Rio de Janeiro
Attendance: 7,990
Referees: Eddie Viator (FRA), Steven Anderson (USA), José Reyes (MEX)

7 August 2016
19:00

Boxscore

Croatia	72–70	Spain
Scoring by quarter: 13–21, 19–17, 15–16, 25–16
Pts: Bogdanović 23; Rebs: three players 7 Asts: Šarić 5		Pts: Gasol 26; Rebs: Gasol 9 Asts: Rodríguez 7

Carioca Arena 1, Rio de Janeiro
Attendance: 8,039
Referees: Stephen Seibel (CAN), Oļegs Latiševs (LAT), Robert Lottermoser (GER)

7 August 2016
22:30

Boxscore

Nigeria	66–94	Argentina
Scoring by quarter: 15–22, 16–28, 19–22, 16–22
Pts: Diogu 15; Rebs: Diogu 13; Asts: Gbinije, Umeh 3		Pts: Campazzo 19; Rebs: Scola 9 Asts: Campazzo, Ginóbili 5

Carioca Arena 1, Rio de Janeiro
Attendance: 8,425
Referees: Ilija Belošević (SRB), Damir Javor (SLO), Borys Ryzhyk (UKR)

9 August 2016
14:15

Boxscore

Spain	65–66	Brazil
Scoring by quarter: 13–18, 18–16, 14–19, 20–13
Pts: Gasol 13; Rebs: Gasol 10; Asts: Rodríguez 5		Pts: Huertas 11; Rebs: Lima 10; Asts: Huertas 7

Carioca Arena 1, Rio de Janeiro
Attendance: 10,761
Referees: Ilija Belošević (SRB), Roberto Vázquez (PUR), Damir Javor (SLO)

9 August 2016
19:00

Boxscore

Lithuania	89–80	Nigeria
Scoring by quarter: 13–16, 23–25, 29–13, 24–26
Pts: Mačiulis 21; Rebs: Sabonis 7 Asts: Kalnietis 12		Pts: Diogu 19; Rebs: Diogu 7 Asts: Ere 4

Carioca Arena 1, Rio de Janeiro
Attendance: 5,785
Referees: Stephen Seibel (CAN), Robert Lottermoser (GER), Anne Panther (GER)

9 August 2016
22:30

Boxscore

Argentina	90–82	Croatia
Scoring by quarter: 22–22, 24–18, 27–14, 17–28
Pts: Scola 23; Rebs: Scola 9 Asts: Campazzo 8		Pts: Šarić 19; Rebs: Šarić 10; Asts: Šarić 7

Carioca Arena 1, Rio de Janeiro
Attendance: 8,514
Referees: Christos Christodoulou (GRE), Steven Anderson (USA), José Reyes (MEX)

11 August 2016
14:15

Boxscore

Brazil	76–80	Croatia
Scoring by quarter: 17–19, 14–22, 19–18, 26–21
Pts: Barbosa 16; Rebs: Lima 6 Asts: Huertas 9		Pts: Bogdanović 33; Rebs: Šarić 7 Asts: Ukić 4

Carioca Arena 1, Rio de Janeiro
Attendance: 10,756
Referees: Borys Ryzhyk (UKR), Roberto Vázquez (PUR), Oļegs Latiševs (LAT)

11 August 2016
19:00

Boxscore

Nigeria	87–96	Spain
Scoring by quarter: 11–25, 30–18, 25–22, 21–31
Pts: Oguchi 24; Rebs: Diogu 7 Asts: Uzoh 7		Pts: Gasol 16; Rebs: Reyes 9 Asts: Llull 5

Carioca Arena 1, Rio de Janeiro
Attendance: 6,999
Referees: Steven Anderson (USA), José Reyes (MEX), Duan Zhu (CHN)

11 August 2016
22:30

Boxscore

Lithuania	81–73	Argentina
Scoring by quarter: 16–15, 14–12, 27–22, 24–24
Pts: Kuzminskas 23; Rebs: Valančiūnas 10; Asts: Kalnietis 7		Pts: Ginóbili 22; Rebs: Nocioni, Scola 7 Asts: Scola 4

Carioca Arena 1, Rio de Janeiro
Attendance: 11,093
Referees: Ilija Belošević (SRB), Damir Javor (SLO), Eddie Viator (FRA)

13 August 2016
14:15

Boxscore

Argentina	111–107 (2OT)	Brazil
Scoring by quarter: 28–19, 16–33, 23–20, 18–13, Overtime: 10–10, 16–12
Pts: Nocioni 37; Rebs: Nocioni 11; Asts: Campazzo 11		Pts: Nenê 24; Rebs: Nenê 10; Asts: Neto 4

Carioca Arena 1, Rio de Janeiro
Attendance: 11,701
Referees: Christos Christodoulou (GRE), Stephen Seibel (CAN), José Reyes (MEX)

13 August 2016
19:00

Boxscore

Spain	109–59	Lithuania
Scoring by quarter: 26–11, 22–18, 36–16, 25–14
Pts: Gasol 23; Rebs: Reyes 9 Asts: Llull 6		Pts: Kuzminskas 17; Rebs: Valančiūnas 10; Asts: Mačiulis 2

Carioca Arena 1, Rio de Janeiro
Attendance: 11,045
Referees: Ilija Belošević (SRB), Roberto Vázquez (PUR), Oļegs Latiševs (LAT)

13 August 2016
22:30

Boxscore

Croatia	76–90	Nigeria
Scoring by quarter: 28–21, 11–22, 17–27, 20–20
Pts: Bogdanović 28; Rebs: Simon 6 Asts: Ukić 4		Pts: Umeh 19; Rebs: Diogu 12; Asts: Ere 6

Carioca Arena 1, Rio de Janeiro
Attendance: 8,720
Referees: Steven Anderson (USA), Damir Javor (SLO), Scott Beker (AUS)

15 August 2016
14:15

Boxscore

Nigeria	69–86	Brazil
Scoring by quarter: 16–15, 15–27, 21–17, 17–27
Pts: Akognon 16; Rebs: Aminu 7 Asts: four players 2		Pts: Nenê 19; Rebs: Nenê 7 Asts: Huertas 11

Carioca Arena 1, Rio de Janeiro
Attendance: 11,173
Referees: Ilija Belošević (SRB), Ferdinand Pascual (PHI), Robert Lottermoser (GER)

15 August 2016
19:00

Boxscore

Spain	92–73	Argentina
Scoring by quarter: 25–15, 23–20, 23–22, 21–16
Pts: Fernández 23; Rebs: Gasol 13; Asts: Llull, Rodríguez 5		Pts: Laprovíttola 21; Rebs: three players 5 Asts: Laprovíttola 4

Carioca Arena 1, Rio de Janeiro
Attendance: 10,949
Referees: Christos Christodoulou (GRE), Stephen Seibel (CAN), Roberto Vázquez (PUR)

15 August 2016
22:30

Boxscore

Lithuania	81–90	Croatia
Scoring by quarter: 21–13, 20–34, 14–28, 26–15
Pts: Kalnietis 26; Rebs: Valančiūnas 6 Asts: Kalnietis 11		Pts: Bogdanović 22; Rebs: Simon 10; Asts: Simon 6

Carioca Arena 1, Rio de Janeiro
Attendance: 7,809
Referees: Borys Ryzhyk (UKR), Steven Anderson (USA), Piotr Pastusiak (POL)

== Knockout stage ==
=== Bracket ===
Quarterfinals
17 August
Australia	90
Lithuania	64
17 August
Croatia	83
Serbia	86
17 August
Spain	92
France	67
17 August
United States	105
Argentina	78

Semifinals
19 August
Australia	61
Serbia	87
19 August
Spain	76
United States	82

Gold medal
21 August
Serbia	66
United States	96
Bronze medal
21 August
Australia	88
Spain	89

=== Quarterfinals ===
17 August 2016
11:00

Boxscore

Australia	90–64	Lithuania
Scoring by quarter: 26–17, 22–13, 22–13, 20–21
Pts: Mills 24; Rebs: Bogut 7 Asts: Bogut 6		Pts: Kalnietis, Kavaliauskas 12; Rebs: Valančiūnas 8 Asts: Kalnietis 5

Carioca Arena 1, Rio de Janeiro
Attendance: 9,348
Referees: Steven Anderson (USA), Stephen Seibel (CAN), Piotr Pastusiak (POL)

17 August 2016
14:30

Boxscore

Spain	92–67	France
Scoring by quarter: 19–16, 24–14, 26–19, 23–18
Pts: Mirotić 23; Rebs: Gasol 8 Asts: Navarro 5		Pts: Parker 14; Rebs: Gobert 12; Asts: Diaw 5

Carioca Arena 1, Rio de Janeiro
Attendance: 9,725
Referees: José Reese (MEX), Damir Javor (SLO), Oļegs Latiševs (LAT)

17 August 2016
18:45

Boxscore

United States	105–78	Argentina
Scoring by quarter: 25–21, 31–19, 31–21, 18–17
Pts: Durant 27; Rebs: George 8 Asts: Durant 6		Pts: Scola 15; Rebs: Scola 10; Asts: Campazzo 9

Carioca Arena 1, Rio de Janeiro
Attendance: 11,700
Referees: Ilija Belošević (SRB), Guilherme Locatelli (BRA), Robert Lottermoser (GER)

17 August 2016
22:15

Boxscore

Croatia	83–86	Serbia
Scoring by quarter: 19–20, 19–12, 14–34, 31–20
Pts: Bogdanović 28; Rebs: Planinić 9 Asts: Simon 5		Pts: Bogdanović 18; Rebs: three players 4 Asts: Teodosić 10

Carioca Arena 1, Rio de Janeiro
Attendance: 9,027
Referees: Juan García (ESP), Borys Ryzhyk (UKR), Roberto Vázquez (PUR)

=== Semifinals ===
19 August 2016
15:30

Boxscore

Spain	76–82	United States
Scoring by quarter: 17–26, 22–19, 18–21, 19–16
Pts: Gasol 23; Rebs: Gasol 8 Asts: Rodríguez 5		Pts: Thompson 22; Rebs: Jordan 16; Asts: Lowry, Thompson 3

Carioca Arena 1, Rio de Janeiro
Attendance: 10,455
Referees: Christos Christodoulou (GRE), José Reyes (MEX), Guilherme Locatelli (BRA)

19 August 2016
19:00

Boxscore

Australia	61–87	Serbia
Scoring by quarter: 5–16, 9–19, 24–31, 23–21
Pts: Mills, Motum 13; Rebs: Baynes 8 Asts: Broekhoff 4		Pts: Teodosić 22; Rebs: Jokić 11; Asts: Teodosić 5

Carioca Arena 1, Rio de Janeiro
Attendance: 9,655
Referees: Stephen Seibel (CAN), Robert Lottermoser (GER), Oļegs Latiševs (LAT)

=== Bronze medal game ===
21 August 2016
11:30

Boxscore

Australia	88–89	Spain
Scoring by quarter: 17–23, 21–17, 26–27, 24–22
Pts: Mills 30; Rebs: Lisch, Motum 6 Asts: Dellavedova 8		Pts: Gasol 31; Rebs: Gasol 11; Asts: Rodríguez 5

Carioca Arena 1, Rio de Janeiro
Attendance: 9,449
Referees: Ilija Belošević (SRB), Steven Anderson (USA), Roberto Vázquez (PUR)

=== Gold medal game ===
21 August 2016
15:45

Boxscore

Serbia	66–96	United States
Scoring by quarter: 15–19, 14–33, 14–27, 23–17
Pts: Nedović 14; Rebs: Jokić 4 Asts: three players 3		Pts: Durant 30; Rebs: Cousins 15; Asts: Lowry 5

Carioca Arena 1, Rio de Janeiro
Attendance: 10,658
Referees: José Reyes (MEX), Borys Ryzhyk (UKR), Juan García (SPA)

Team details

Serbia	United States

PG	4	Miloš Teodosić (c)
SF	5	Marko Simonović
SG	7	Bogdan Bogdanović
PF	12	Stefan Birčević
C	14	Nikola Jokić
PG	9	Stefan Marković
C	13	Miroslav Raduljica
PG	24	Stefan Jović
PF	25	Milan Mačvan
Head Coach:
(Serbia) Aleksandar Đorđević

G	5	Kevin Durant
G	9	DeMar DeRozan
G	7	Kyle Lowry
C	12	DeMarcus Cousins
F	13	Paul George
G	4	Jimmy Butler
C	6	DeAndre Jordan
G	10	Kyrie Irving
G	11	Klay Thompson
F	15	Carmelo Anthony
Head Coach:
(United States) Mike Krzyzewski

== Awards ==
2016 Olympic Basketball champions

United States
Fifteenth title

== Statistical leaders ==
=== Individual tournament highs ===
Points
Name	GP	PPG
Bojan Bogdanović (CRO)	6	25.3
Patty Mills (AUS)	7	21.3
Yi Jianlian (CHN)	5	20.4
Pau Gasol (ESP)	8	19.5
Kevin Durant (USA)	8	19.4

Rebounds
Name	GP	RPG
Pau Gasol (ESP)	8	8.9
Ike Diogu (NGR)	5	8.6
Luis Scola (ARG)	6	8.3
Rudy Gobert (FRA)	6	7.2
Jonas Valančiūnas (LTU)	6	7.0

Assists
Name	GP	APG
Mantas Kalnietis (LTU)	6	7.5
Matthew Dellavedova (AUS)	8	7.0
Marcelinho Huertas (BRA)	5	6.6
Facundo Campazzo (ARG)	6	5.8
Miloš Teodosić (SRB)	8	5.4

Blocks
Name	GP	BPG
Ekene Ibekwe (NGR)	5	2.4
Pau Gasol (ESP)	8	1.9
Rudy Gobert (FRA)	6	1.8
Andrew Bogut (AUS)	7	1.4
Ike Diogu (NGR)	5	1.2

Steals
Name	GP	SPG
Facundo Campazzo (ARG)	6	2.8
Gregory Vargas (VEN)	5	2.2
Nene Hilario (BRA)	5	2.0
Rudy Fernández (ESP)	8	1.9
Nikola Jokić (SRB)	8	1.5
Paul George (USA)	8	1.5

Minutes
Name	GP	MPG
Bojan Bogdanović (CRO)	6	35.3
Dario Šarić (CRO)	6	33.1
Yi Jianlian (CHN)	5	32.8
Mantas Kalnietis (LTU)	6	31.7
Andrés Nocioni (ARG)	6	31.7

=== Individual game highs ===
Statistic	Name	Total	Opponent
Points	Andrés Nocioni (ARG)	37	Brazil
Total Rebounds	DeAndre Jordan (USA)	16	Spain
Assists	Matthew Dellavedova (AUS)	13	Serbia
Blocks	Rudy Gobert (FRA)	5	China
Steals	Facundo Campazzo (ARG)	5	Nigeria
Minutes	Andrés Nocioni (ARG)	47:23	Brazil
Field goal percentage	Andrew Bogut (AUS)	90% (9/10)	France
2-point field goal percentage	Nikola Mirotić (ESP)	100% (7/7)	Lithuania
3-point field goal percentage	Pau Gasol (ESP)	100% (5/5)	Lithuania
Free throw percentage	Patty Mills (AUS); Jimmy Butler (USA); Gregory Vargas (VEN); Nando de Colo (FRA); Nando de Colo (FRA)	100% (8/8)	Serbia; Venezuela; China; Serbia; China
Turnovers	Miloš Teodosić (SRB); Dario Šarić (CRO); Jonas Mačiulis (LTU)	6	Australia; Brazil; Argentina

Statistic	Name	Total	Opponent
Field goals made	Pau Gasol (ESP)	12	Australia
Field goals attempted	Facundo Campazzo (ARG); Patty Mills (AUS)	22	Brazil; United States
2-point field goals made	Nene Hilario (BRA); Pau Gasol (ESP)	11	Argentina; Australia
2-point field goals attempted	Nene Hilario (BRA)	17	Argentina
3-point field goals made	Carmelo Anthony (USA)	9	Australia
3-point field goals attempted	Carmelo Anthony (USA)	15	Australia
Free throws made	Miroslav Raduljica (SRB)	11	Australia
Free throws attempted	Manu Ginóbili (ARG)	17	Lithuania
Offensive Rebounds	Ike Diogu (NGR)	8	Croatia
Defensive Rebounds	DeAndre Jordan (USA)	13	Spain

=== Team tournament highs ===
Points
Team	GP	PPG
United States	8	100.9
Argentina	6	86.5
Spain	8	86.1
Australia	8	85.4
Serbia	8	83.1

Rebounds
Team	GP	RPG
United States	8	45.5
Spain	8	38.3
Brazil	5	38.2
Argentina	6	38.2
Croatia	6	38.2

Assists
Team	GP	APG
Australia	8	24.3
United States	8	24.0
Serbia	8	22.1
France	6	21.2
Spain	8	20.5

Blocks
Team	GP	BPG
Nigeria	5	5.0
United States	8	3.5
France	6	3.5
Lithuania	6	3.5
Spain	8	3.0

Steals
Team	GP	SPG
United States	8	8.8
Argentina	6	8.7
Serbia	8	8.4
Venezuela	5	7.8
Spain	8	7.6
China	5	7.6

=== Team game highs ===
Statistic	Team	Total	Opponent
Points	United States	119	China
Total rebounds	United States	54	Argentina
Assists	Australia	34	China
Blocked shots	France	8	China
Steals	United States	15	China
Field goal percentage	France	61.2%	Venezuela
2-point field goal percentage	United States	69.4%	France
3-point field goal percentage	Croatia	57.9%	Lithuania
Free throws percentage	Croatia	88.2%	Brazil
Turnovers	China	24	United States

Statistic	Team	Total	Opponent
Field goals made	France; France; United States	41	Venezuela; United States; Argentina
Field goals attempted	United States	89	Argentina
Two-point field goals made	France; France	36	Venezuela; United States
Two-point field goals attempted	Brazil	57	Argentina
Three-point field goals made	Argentina; Nigeria; United States	17	Brazil; Croatia; Australia
Three-point field goal attempted	Argentina	42	Brazil
Free throws made	United States; United States	33	Serbia; China
Free throws attempted	United States	45	China
Offensive rebounds	United States; United States	21	Australia; Spain
Defensive rebounds	Lithuania	40	Argentina

== Final ranking ==
Rankings are determined by:

- 1st–4th
  - Results of gold and bronze medal games
- 5th–8th:
  - Win–loss record in the preliminary round group
  - Standings in the preliminary round group (i.e. Group A's 3rd is ranked higher than Group B's 4th.)
- 9th–10th and 11th–12th:
  - 5th placers in the preliminary round groups are classified 9th–10th; 6th placers classified 11th–12th
  - Win–loss record in the preliminary round group

Rank	Team	Pld	W	L	PF	PA	PD	Standing	New rank
1st place, gold medalist(s)	United States	8	8	0	807	627	+180		1
2nd place, silver medalist(s)	Serbia	8	4	4	665	627	+38		3 (▲3)
3rd place, bronze medalist(s)	Spain	8	5	3	689	594	+95		2
4th	Australia	8	5	3	683	608	+75		10 (▲1)
Eliminated at the quarterfinals
5th	Croatia	6	3	3	483	493	−10	B–1st	11 (▲1)
6th	France	6	3	3	490	470	+20	A–3rd	4 (▲1)
7th	Lithuania	6	3	3	456	518	−62	B–3rd	5 (▼2)
8th	Argentina	6	3	3	519	533	−14	B–4th	6 (▼2)
Preliminary round 5th placers
9th	Brazil	5	2	3	411	407	+4		7 (▲2)
10th	Venezuela	5	1	4	315	444	−129		15 (▲7)
Preliminary round 6th placers
11th	Nigeria	5	1	4	392	441	–49		16 (▲9)
12th	China	5	0	5	318	466	−148		14
