= Basketball at the 2016 Summer Olympics – Men's qualification =

2016 FIBA Olympic Qualifying Tournaments
For Men

Tournament details
- Host country: Italy; Philippines; Serbia
- Dates: 4 – 10 July 2016
- Teams: 18
- Venue(s): 3 (in 3 host cities)

The basketball qualification for the Summer Olympics men's basketball tournament occurred from 2014 to 2016; all five FIBA (International Basketball Federation) zones sent in teams.

The first qualifying tournament was the 2014 FIBA Basketball World Cup in which the champion was guaranteed of a place in the Olympics. Throughout the next two years, several regional tournaments served as qualification for the zonal tournaments, which doubled as intercontinental championships, to determine which teams would participate in the 2016 Rio de Janeiro Summer Olympics.

== Method ==
=== Qualification via continental championships and World Cup ===
A total of 12 teams will take part in the Olympics, with each NOC sending in one team.

There were a total of 5 zonal tournaments (doubling as intercontinental championships) that determined the qualifying teams, with a total of 7 teams qualifying outright. Each zone was allocated with the following qualifying berths:

- FIBA Africa: 1 team (Champion)
- FIBA Americas: 2 teams (Champion and runner-up)
- FIBA Asia: 1 team (Champion)
- FIBA Europe: 2 teams (Champion and runner-up)
- FIBA Oceania: 1 team (Champion)

Furthermore, the current world champion, the United States qualified automatically by winning at the 2014 FIBA Basketball World Cup.

=== Qualification via hosting the Olympics ===
The host nation (Brazil) qualified after FIBA voted to allow them to qualify as hosts in a meeting at Tokyo in August 2015.

=== Qualification via the wild card tournament ===
The additional three teams will be determined at the 2016 FIBA World Olympic Qualifying Tournament for Men, with the best non-qualifying teams participating from teams that did not qualify outright. Each zone was allocated with the following berths:

- Hosts: 3 teams
- FIBA Africa: 3 teams
- FIBA Americas: 3 teams
- FIBA Asia: 3 teams
- FIBA Europe: 5 teams
- FIBA Oceania: 1 team

There would be three tournaments, with the winners in each tournament winning a berth to the Olympics. All teams that are participating in the continental championships are allowed to bid as hosts. If the host team already qualified outright, the next best team from its continent would be invited to participate instead of them.

== Qualified teams ==
Teams are arranged by time of qualification.

Team	Qualification		Appearance			Best performance	FIBA World Rankings
Team	Date	As	Last	Total	Streak	Best performance	FIBA World Rankings
United States	14 September 2014	Champions of the 2014 FIBA Basketball World Cup	2012	17	9th	14× gold medalists	1
Brazil	9 August 2015	Hosts of the 2016 Summer Olympics	2012	15	2nd	3× bronze medalists	9
Australia	18 August 2015	Champions of the 2015 FIBA Oceania Championship	2012	14	12th	4th place	11
Nigeria	30 August 2015	Champions of AfroBasket 2015	2012	2	2nd	10th place	25
Venezuela	11 September 2015	Champions of the 2015 FIBA Americas Championship	1992	2	1st	11th place	22
Argentina	11 September 2015	Finalists of the 2015 FIBA Americas Championship	2012	7	4th	1× gold medalists	4
Spain	17 September 2015	Champions of EuroBasket 2015	2012	12	4th	3× silver medalists	2
Lithuania	18 September 2015	Finalists of EuroBasket 2015	2012	7	7th	3× bronze medalists	3
China	3 October 2015	Champions of the 2015 FIBA Asia Championship	2012	11	1st	5th place	14
Serbia	9 July 2016	Winner of 2016 FIBA World Olympic Qualifying Tournament – Belgrade	2004	3	1st	1× silver medalists	6
Croatia	9 July 2016	Winner of 2016 FIBA World Olympic Qualifying Tournament – Turin	2008	3	1st	1× silver medalists	12
France	10 July 2016	Winner of 2016 FIBA World Olympic Qualifying Tournament – Manila	2012	9	2nd	1× silver medalists	5

== 2014 FIBA Basketball World Cup ==
As winners of the 2014 FIBA Basketball World Cup, the USA automatically qualified for the 2016 Olympics, and chose not to participate in the 2015 FIBA Americas Championship.

#	Team	W–L	Qualification
1st place, gold medalist(s)	United States	9–0	Qualify to the Olympics
2nd place, silver medalist(s)	Serbia	5–4	
3rd place, bronze medalist(s)	France	6–3	
4	Lithuania	6–3	
5	Spain	6–1	
6	Brazil	5–2	
7	Slovenia	5–2	
8	Turkey	4–3	
9	Greece	5–1	
10	Croatia	3–3	
11	Argentina	3–3	
12	Australia	3–3	
13	Dominican Republic	2–4	
14	Mexico	2–4	
15	New Zealand	2–4	
16	Senegal	2–4	
17	Angola	2–3	
18	Ukraine	2–3	
19	Puerto Rico	1–4	
20	Iran	1–4	
21	Philippines	1–4	
22	Finland	1–4	
23	South Korea	0–5	
24	Egypt	0–5	

== FIBA Africa ==
=== AfroBasket qualification ===
Hosts Tunisia and defending champions Angola qualified automatically. The other berths were disputed per each FIBA Africa zone, with three wild card berths awarded to complete the 16-team roster.

==== Zone 1 ====
#	Team	W–L	Qualification
1st place, gold medalist(s)	Morocco	2–1	Qualify to the AfroBasket
2nd place, silver medalist(s)	Algeria	2–1	Selected as a wild card
3rd place, bronze medalist(s)	Libya	0–2	Withdrew

==== Zone 2 ====
===== Group B =====
#	Team	W–L	Qualification
1st place, gold medalist(s)	Mali	2–0	Qualify to the AfroBasket
2nd place, silver medalist(s)	Senegal	0–2	Selected as a wild card

===== Group C =====
#	Team	W–L	Qualification
1st place, gold medalist(s)	Cape Verde	2–0	Qualify to the AfroBasket
2nd place, silver medalist(s)	Guinea	0–2	

==== Zone 3 ====
===== Group D =====
#	Team	W–L	Qualification
1st place, gold medalist(s)	Ivory Coast	2–0	Qualify to the AfroBasket
2nd place, silver medalist(s)	Benin	0–2	

===== Group E =====
#	Team	W–L	Qualification
1st place, gold medalist(s)	Nigeria	2–0	Qualify to the AfroBasket
2nd place, silver medalist(s)	Burkina Faso	0–2	

==== Zone 4 ====
===== Group F =====
#	Team	W–L	Qualification
1st place, gold medalist(s)	Cameroon	2–0	Qualify to the AfroBasket
2nd place, silver medalist(s)	Congo	0–2	

===== Group G =====
#	Team	W–L	Qualification
1st place, gold medalist(s)	Gabon	3–1	Qualify to the AfroBasket
2nd place, silver medalist(s)	Central African Republic	2–2	Selected as a wild card
3rd place, bronze medalist(s)	Chad	1–3	

==== Zone 5 ====
#	Team	W–L	Qualification
1st place, gold medalist(s)	Egypt	4–0	Qualify to the AfroBasket
2nd place, silver medalist(s)	Uganda	3–1	Qualify to the AfroBasket
3rd place, bronze medalist(s)	Rwanda	2–2	
4	Kenya	1–3	
5	Somalia	0–4	

==== Zone 6 ====
===== Group I =====
#	Team	W–L	Qualification
1st place, gold medalist(s)	Zimbabwe	3–1	Qualify to the AfroBasket
2nd place, silver medalist(s)	South Africa	2–2	
3rd place, bronze medalist(s)	Seychelles	1–3	

===== Group J =====
#	Team	W–L	Qualification
1st place, gold medalist(s)	Mozambique	2–0	Qualify to the AfroBasket
2nd place, silver medalist(s)	Botswana	0–2	

=== AfroBasket ===
#	Team	W–L	Qualification
1st place, gold medalist(s)	Nigeria	6–1	Qualify to the Olympics
2nd place, silver medalist(s)	Angola	5–2	Qualify to Final Qualifying Tournament
3rd place, bronze medalist(s)	Tunisia	6–1	Qualify to Final Qualifying Tournament
4	Senegal	5–2	Qualify to Final Qualifying Tournament
5	Egypt	6–1	
6	Algeria	3–4	
7	Mali	3–4	
8	Gabon	1–6	
9	Cameroon	3–2	
10	Cape Verde	3–2	
11	Mozambique	2–3	
12	Ivory Coast	2–3	
13	Morocco	1–4	
14	Central African Republic	1–4	
15	Uganda	1–4	
16	Zimbabwe	0–5	

== FIBA Americas ==
=== FIBA Americas Championship qualification ===
Qualification in the FIBA Americas was first via the Central American and Caribbean championships, where the top three teams in each tournament advance to the Centrobasket, where four FiBA Americas Championship berths were up for grabs. Four berths were disputed in the South American Championship. Mexico, which had already qualified, were awarded hosting duties. Canada and the USA are automatic entrants, but world champions USA chose to skip the tournament as they had already qualified via the World Cup.

==== Central America ====
#	Team	W–L	Qualification
1st place, gold medalist(s)	Mexico	3–0	Qualify to the Centrobasket
2nd place, silver medalist(s)	El Salvador	2–1	Qualify to the Centrobasket
3rd place, bronze medalist(s)	Costa Rica	1–2	Qualify to the Centrobasket
4	Honduras	0–3	

==== Caribbean ====
#	Team	W–L	Qualification
1st place, gold medalist(s)	Bahamas	4–1	Qualify to the Centrobasket
2nd place, silver medalist(s)	Cuba	3–2	Qualify to the Centrobasket
3rd place, bronze medalist(s)	Virgin Islands	4–1	Qualify to the Centrobasket
4	British Virgin Islands	2–3	
5	Guyana	2–3	
6	Barbados	2–3	
7	Antigua and Barbuda	2–3	
8	Saint Vincent and the Grenadines	1–4	

==== Central America and Caribbean ====
#	Team	W–L	Qualification
1st place, gold medalist(s)	Mexico	6–0	Qualify to the Americas Championship
2nd place, silver medalist(s)	Puerto Rico	4–2	Qualify to the Americas Championship
3rd place, bronze medalist(s)	Dominican Republic	5–1	Qualify to the Americas Championship
4	Cuba	3–3	Qualify to the Americas Championship
5	Panama	2–2	Qualify to the Americas Championship
6	Virgin Islands	2–2	
7	Bahamas	1–3	
8	Jamaica	1–3	
9	Costa Rica	0–4	
10	El Salvador	0–4	

==== South America ====
#	Team	W–L	Qualification
1st place, gold medalist(s)	Venezuela	4–1	Qualify to the Americas Championship
2nd place, silver medalist(s)	Argentina	4–1	Qualify to the Americas Championship
3rd place, bronze medalist(s)	Brazil	3–2	Qualify to the Americas Championship
4	Uruguay	2–3	Qualify to the Americas Championship
5	Paraguay	3–2	
6	Chile	2–3	
7	Ecuador	1–4	
8	Peru	0–5	

=== FIBA Americas Championship ===
#	Team	W–L	Qualification
1st place, gold medalist(s)	Venezuela	6–4	Qualify to the Olympics
2nd place, silver medalist(s)	Argentina	8–2	Qualify to the Olympics
3rd place, bronze medalist(s)	Canada	8–2	Qualify to Final Qualifying Tournament
4	Mexico	7–3	Qualify to Final Qualifying Tournament
5	Puerto Rico	4–4	Qualify to Final Qualifying Tournament
6	Dominican Republic	2–6	
7	Panama	2–6	
8	Uruguay	2–6	
9	Brazil	1–3	Qualify as host nation
10	Cuba	0–4	

== FIBA Asia ==
=== FIBA Asia Championship qualification ===
Qualification in FIBA Asia was done in two stages. First, on the FIBA Asia Cup, the winner qualifies to the FIBA Asia Championship, while the second to fifth-ranked team get additional berths for their respective FIBA Asia subzones. The second stage was via the subzones. The East Asia subzone chose to award its berths based on the FIBA World Rankings, as no country was willing to host the championship.

==== FIBA Asia Cup ====
#	Team	W–L	Qualification
1st place, gold medalist(s)	Iran	4–1	Qualify to the Asian Championship
2nd place, silver medalist(s)	Chinese Taipei	4–1	+1 East Asia berth
3rd place, bronze medalist(s)	Philippines	3–2	+1 Southeast Asia berth
4	China	2–3	
5	Jordan	3–2	+1 West Asia berth
6	Japan	2–3	+1 East Asia berth
7	India	1–4	
8	Singapore	0–5	
8	Indonesia	0–5	

==== Central Asia ====
#	Team	W–L	Qualification
1st place, gold medalist(s)	Kazakhstan	1–0	Qualify to the Asian Championship
2nd place, silver medalist(s)	Kyrgyzstan	0–1	

==== East Asia ====
Team	Rank	Qualification
China	14	Qualify to the Asian Championship
South Korea	28	Qualify to the Asian Championship
Chinese Taipei	44	Qualify to the Asian Championship
Japan	47	Qualify to the Asian Championship
Hong Kong	69	Qualify to the Asian Championship

==== Gulf ====
#	Team	W–L	Qualification
1st place, gold medalist(s)	Qatar	5–0	Qualify to the Asian Championship
2nd place, silver medalist(s)	Kuwait	4–1	Qualify to the Asian Championship
3rd place, bronze medalist(s)	Bahrain	3–2	
4	Saudi Arabia	2–3	
5	United Arab Emirates	1–4	
6	Oman	0–5	

==== South Asia ====
#	Team	W–L	Qualification
1st place, gold medalist(s)	India	5–0	Qualify to the Asian Championship
2nd place, silver medalist(s)	Sri Lanka	4–1	
3rd place, bronze medalist(s)	Nepal	2–3	
4	Bangladesh	2–3	
5	Maldives	2–3	
6	Bhutan	0–5	

==== Southeast Asia ====
#	Team	W–L	Qualification
1st place, gold medalist(s)	Philippines	5–0	Qualify to the Asian Championship
2nd place, silver medalist(s)	Malaysia	4–1	Qualify to the Asian Championship
3rd place, bronze medalist(s)	Singapore	3–2	Qualify to the Asian Championship
4	Indonesia	2–3	
5	Laos	1–4	
6	Brunei	0–5	

==== West Asia ====
#	Team	W–L	Qualification
1st place, gold medalist(s)	Lebanon	4–0	Qualify to the Asian Championship
2nd place, silver medalist(s)	Jordan	3–1	Qualify to the Asian Championship
3rd place, bronze medalist(s)	Palestine	2–2	Qualify to the Asian Championship
4	Syria	1–3	
5	Iraq	0–4	

=== FIBA Asia Championship ===
#	Team	W–L	Qualification
1st place, gold medalist(s)	China	9–0	Qualify to the Olympics
2nd place, silver medalist(s)	Philippines	7–2	Qualify to Final Olympic Qualifying Tournament as host
3rd place, bronze medalist(s)	Iran	7–2	Qualify to Final Qualifying Tournament
4	Japan	5–4	Qualify to Final Qualifying Tournament
5	Lebanon	5–4	Stripped of qualification to Final Qualifying Tournament
6	South Korea	5–4	
7	Qatar	4–5	
8	India	3–6	
9	Jordan	5–3	
10	Palestine	4–4	
11	Kazakhstan	2–6	
12	Hong Kong	1–7	
13	Chinese Taipei	3–2	
14	Kuwait	1–4	
15	Singapore	1–4	
16	Malaysia	0–5	

== FIBA Europe ==
=== EuroBasket qualification ===
There were two rounds of qualification for EuroBasket. On the first round, the group winners qualify to a knockout stage; the winner qualifies to the championship, all other teams, including those eliminated in the group stages, participate in the second round, where the group winners and the runners-up, except for the team with worst record, qualifies to the final tournament. European teams that participated in the 2014 FIBA Basketball World Cup also Qualify to the final tournament. Hosts Ukraine were stripped of the hosting duties, but still were retained by virtue of participating in the 2014 FIBA Basketball World Cup; instead hosting rights were awarded to four countries: Croatia, France, Germany and Latvia, each hosting a preliminary round group, with France hosting the final round.

==== First round ====
===== Group A =====
#	Team	W–L	Qualification
1st place, gold medalist(s)	Bulgaria	3–0	Advance to knockout stage
2nd place, silver medalist(s)	Iceland	2–2	Advance to second round
3rd place, bronze medalist(s)	Romania	1–3	Advance to second round

===== Group B =====
#	Team	W–L	Qualification
1st place, gold medalist(s)	Estonia	3–1	Advance to knockout stage
2nd place, silver medalist(s)	Portugal	2–2	Advance to second round
3rd place, bronze medalist(s)	Netherlands	1–3	Advance to second round

===== Group C =====
#	Team	W–L	Qualification
1st place, gold medalist(s)	Switzerland	5–1	Advance to knockout stage
2nd place, silver medalist(s)	Austria	5–1	Advance to second round
3rd place, bronze medalist(s)	Denmark	2–4	Advance to second round
4	Luxembourg	0–6	Advance to second round

===== Group D =====
#	Team	W–L	Qualification
1st place, gold medalist(s)	Belarus	3–1	Advance to knockout stage
2nd place, silver medalist(s)	Slovakia	2–2	Advance to second round
3rd place, bronze medalist(s)	Hungary	1–3	Advance to second round

===== Knockout stage =====
#	Team	W–L	Qualification
1st place, gold medalist(s)	Estonia	2–2	Qualify to EuroBasket
2nd place, silver medalist(s)	Bulgaria	3–1	Advance to second round
3rd place, bronze medalist(s)	Belarus	1–1	Advance to second round
3rd place, bronze medalist(s)	Switzerland	0–2	Advance to second round

==== Second round ====
===== Group A =====
#	Team	W–L	Qualification
1st place, gold medalist(s)	Bosnia and Herzegovina	4–0	Qualify to EuroBasket
2nd place, silver medalist(s)	Iceland	2–2	Qualify to EuroBasket
3rd place, bronze medalist(s)	Great Britain	0–4	

===== Group B =====
#	Team	W–L	Qualification
1st place, gold medalist(s)	Israel	4–2	Qualify to EuroBasket
2nd place, silver medalist(s)	Netherlands	4–2	Qualify to EuroBasket
3rd place, bronze medalist(s)	Montenegro	3–3	
4	Bulgaria	1–5	

===== Group C =====
#	Team	W–L	Qualification
1st place, gold medalist(s)	Poland	5–1	Qualify to EuroBasket
2nd place, silver medalist(s)	Germany	4–2	Qualify to EuroBasket
3rd place, bronze medalist(s)	Austria	3–3	
4	Luxembourg	0–6	

===== Group D =====
#	Team	W–L	Qualification
1st place, gold medalist(s)	Belgium	5–1	Qualify to EuroBasket
2nd place, silver medalist(s)	North Macedonia	5–1	Qualify to EuroBasket
3rd place, bronze medalist(s)	Belarus	2–4	
4	Denmark	0–6	

===== Group E =====
#	Team	W–L	Qualification
1st place, gold medalist(s)	Georgia	4–2	Qualify to EuroBasket
2nd place, silver medalist(s)	Czech Republic	4–2	Qualify to EuroBasket
3rd place, bronze medalist(s)	Hungary	4–2	
4	Portugal	0–6	

===== Group F =====
#	Team	W–L	Qualification
1st place, gold medalist(s)	Latvia	6–0	Qualify to EuroBasket
2nd place, silver medalist(s)	Romania	4–2	
3rd place, bronze medalist(s)	Sweden	2–4	
4	Slovakia	0–6	

===== Group G =====
#	Team	W–L	Qualification
1st place, gold medalist(s)	Italy	3–1	Qualify to EuroBasket
2nd place, silver medalist(s)	Russia	2–2	Qualify to EuroBasket
3rd place, bronze medalist(s)	Switzerland	1–3	

=== EuroBasket ===
#	Team	W–L	Qualification
1st place, gold medalist(s)	Spain	7–2	Qualify to the Olympics
2nd place, silver medalist(s)	Lithuania	7–2	Qualify to the Olympics
3rd place, bronze medalist(s)	France	8–1	Qualify to Final Qualifying Tournament
4	Serbia	7–2	Qualify to Final Olympic Qualifying Tournament as host
5	Greece	7–1	Qualify to Final Qualifying Tournament
6	Italy	5–3	Qualify to Final Olympic Qualifying Tournament as host
7	Czech Republic	5–4	Qualify to Final Qualifying Tournament
8	Latvia	4–5	Qualify to Final Qualifying Tournament
9	Croatia	3–3	Qualify to Final Qualifying Tournament
10	Israel	3–3	
11	Poland	3–3	
12	Slovenia	3–3	
13	Belgium	3–3	
14	Turkey	3–3	Qualify to Final Qualifying Tournament as replacement team for Lebanon
15	Georgia	2–4	
16	Finland	2–4	
17	Russia	1–4	
18	Germany	1–4	
19	North Macedonia	1–4	
20	Estonia	1–4	
21	Netherlands	1–4	
22	Ukraine	1–4	
23	Bosnia and Herzegovina	1–4	
24	Iceland	0–5	

== FIBA Oceania ==
=== FIBA Oceania Championship ===
#	Team	W–L	Qualification
1st place, gold medalist(s)	Australia	2–0	Qualify to the Olympics
2nd place, silver medalist(s)	New Zealand	0–2	Qualify to Final Qualifying Tournament

== FIBA World Olympic Qualifying Tournaments ==
=== Draw ===
In 2016 three qualifying tournaments, each producing a team which qualified for the 2016 Summer Olympics. They were held on 4–10 July 2016 in Turin, Manila and Belgrade. Serbia, Croatia and France qualified for the Olympics as a result of these tournaments.

The format consisted of 18 national teams divided into three tournaments of six teams each, with the winning team from each event qualifying for the Olympics. The draw for the Olympic qualifiers took place at The House of Basketball in Mies, Switzerland on 26 January 2016. The teams were divided into six pots. The draw had three parts. The first part determined in which of the three qualifying tournaments would each team participate, except for the host countries. The second part determined the grouping of each team (Group A or Group B) and the third part determined their position from 1 to 3, which would be used to determine the fixtures.

The teams' FIBA World Rankings on the day of the draw are shown in brackets.

Pot 1	Pot 2	Pot 3	Pot 4	Pot 5	Pot 6
France (5); Serbia (6) (host); Greece (10)	Italy (35) (host); Czech Republic (42); Canada (26)	Philippines (28) (host); Iran (17); Japan (48)	Angola (15); Tunisia (23); Senegal (31)	Latvia (35); Croatia (12); Turkey (8)	Mexico (19); Puerto Rico (16); New Zealand (21)
Source: FIBA

=== Turin ===
The tournament was held in Turin, Italy.

#	Team	W–L	Qualification
1st place, gold medalist(s)	Croatia	3–1	Qualify to the Olympics
2nd place, silver medalist(s)	Italy	3–1	
3rd place, bronze medalist(s)	Greece	2–1	
4	Mexico	1–2	
5	Iran	0–2	
6	Tunisia	0–2	

=== Manila ===
The tournament was held in Manila, Philippines.

#	Team	W–L	Qualification
1st place, gold medalist(s)	France	4–0	Qualify to the Olympics
2nd place, silver medalist(s)	Canada	3–1	
3rd place, bronze medalist(s)	New Zealand	1–2	
4	Turkey	1–2	
5	Senegal	0–2	
6	Philippines	0–2	

=== Belgrade ===
The tournament was held in Belgrade, Serbia.

#	Team	W–L	Qualification
1st place, gold medalist(s)	Serbia	4–0	Qualify to the Olympics
2nd place, silver medalist(s)	Puerto Rico	2–2	
3rd place, bronze medalist(s)	Latvia	2–1	
4	Czech Republic	1–2	
5	Angola	0–2	
6	Japan	0–2	
