= 2016 FIBA World Olympic Qualifying Tournament – Manila =

2016 FIBA World Olympic Qualifying Tournament for Men
Manila, Philippines

Tournament details
- Host country: Philippines
- Dates: 5–10 July
- Teams: 6 (from 5 federations)
- Venue: 1 (in 1 host city)

Final positions
- Champions: France

Tournament statistics
- MVP: (France) Nando de Colo
- Top scorer: (Philippines) Andray Blatche (25.5)
- Top rebounds: (Senegal) Maurice Ndour (10.5)
- Top assists: (Canada) Cory Joseph (4.3)
- PPG (Team): Philippines (82)
- RPG (Team): Senegal (52)
- APG (Team): France (15.3)

Official website
- OQT Philippines

The 2016 FIBA World Olympic Qualifying Tournament in Manila was one of three 2016 FIBA World Olympic Qualifying Tournaments for Men. The tournament was held at the Mall of Asia Arena in Pasay, Philippines, from 5 to 10 July 2016. The national teams of Turkey, Senegal, Canada, France, New Zealand, and hosts Philippines were drawn into the tournament. The winner qualified for the 2016 Summer Olympics.

== Teams ==
Team	Qualification	Date of qualification	FIBA World Ranking
Turkey (Note: Lebanon qualified as fifth placers at the 2015 FIBA Asia Championship with the Philippines named as one of the hosts of the Olympic qualifying tournaments. However, FIBA stated that Lebanon is not "in good standing" or behind in payments with FIBA Asia and the FIBA Executive decided to invite Turkey as replacement taking its FIBA World Ranking and final standings at the EuroBasket in consideration.)	Wild card selection	19 January 2016	8
Senegal	AfroBasket 2015 4th place	30 August 2015	31
Canada	2015 FIBA Americas Championship 3rd place	12 September 2015	26
France	EuroBasket 2015 3rd place	20 September 2015	5
New Zealand	2015 FIBA Oceania Championship runner-up	18 August 2015	21
Philippines (Note: The Philippines also qualified by virtue of being the runner-up at the 2015 FIBA Asia Championship.)	Hosts, FIBA Asian Championship 2nd place	19 January 2016	28

== Venue ==
The Mall of Asia Arena was chosen as the main venue for the tournament. Since the arena's location, Pasay, is part of Metro Manila, the host city of the Philippine qualifiers was designated as "Manila" for marketing purposes. The arena had previously hosted the 2013 FIBA Asia Championship.

Pasay	2016 FIBA World Olympic Qualifying Tournament – Manila (Philippines)
Mall of Asia Arena	2016 FIBA World Olympic Qualifying Tournament – Manila (Philippines)
Capacity: 15,000	2016 FIBA World Olympic Qualifying Tournament – Manila (Philippines)

== Referees ==
The following referees were selected for the tournament.

- (Algeria) Sofiane Si Youcef
- (Australia) Michael Aylen
- (Greece) Elias Koromilas
- (Italy) Luigi Lamonica
- (Philippines) Ferdinand Pascual
- (Puerto Rico) José Carrion
- (Slovenia) Saša Pukl
- (Spain) Miguel Pérez

== Preliminary round ==
All times are local (UTC+8).

=== Group A ===
Pos	Team	Pld	W	L	PF	PA	PD	Pts	Qualification
1	Canada	2	2	0	135	124	+11	4	Semifinals
2	Turkey	2	1	1	137	139	−2	3	Semifinals
3	Senegal	2	0	2	117	126	−9	2	

Source: FIBA
Rules for classification: 1) Points; 2) Head-to-head results; 3) Points difference; 4) Points scored.

5 July 2016
18:30

Boxscore

Turkey	69–77	Canada
Scoring by quarter: 17–21, 13–18, 17–20, 22–18
Pts: Güler 14; Rebs: Erden 8 Asts: Güler 3		Pts: Joseph 21; Rebs: Birch 7 Asts: Joseph 5

Mall of Asia Arena, Pasay
Attendance: 8,000
Referees: Saša Pukl (SLO), Miguel Pérez (ESP), Sofiane Si Youcef (ALG)

6 July 2016
18:30

Boxscore

Canada	58–55	Senegal
Scoring by quarter: 22–20, 11–8, 14–14, 11–13
Pts: Joseph 13; Rebs: Thompson 10; Asts: Ennis 3		Pts: Ndour 16; Rebs: Ndour 10; Asts: Hannah, Niang 4

Mall of Asia Arena, Pasay
Attendance: 7,200
Referees: Luigi Lamonica (ITA), Michael Aylen (AUS), Sofiane Si Youcef (ALG)

7 July 2016
18:30

Boxscore

Senegal	62–68	Turkey
Scoring by quarter: 11–10, 12–23, 20–13, 19–22
Pts: N'Doye 15; Rebs: Ndour 11; Asts: Hannah 4		Pts: Muhammed 23; Rebs: Erden 11; Asts: Muhammed 4

Mall of Asia Arena, Pasay
Attendance: 1,900
Referees: Saša Pukl (SLO), Miguel Pérez (ESP), Sofiane Si Youcef (ALG)

=== Group B ===
Pos	Team	Pld	W	L	PF	PA	PD	Pts	Qualification
1	France	2	2	0	159	143	+16	4	Semifinals
2	New Zealand	2	1	1	148	146	+2	3	Semifinals
3	Philippines (H)	2	0	2	164	182	−18	2	

Source: FIBA
Rules for classification: 1) Points; 2) Head-to-head results; 3) Points difference; 4) Points scored.
(H) Hosts
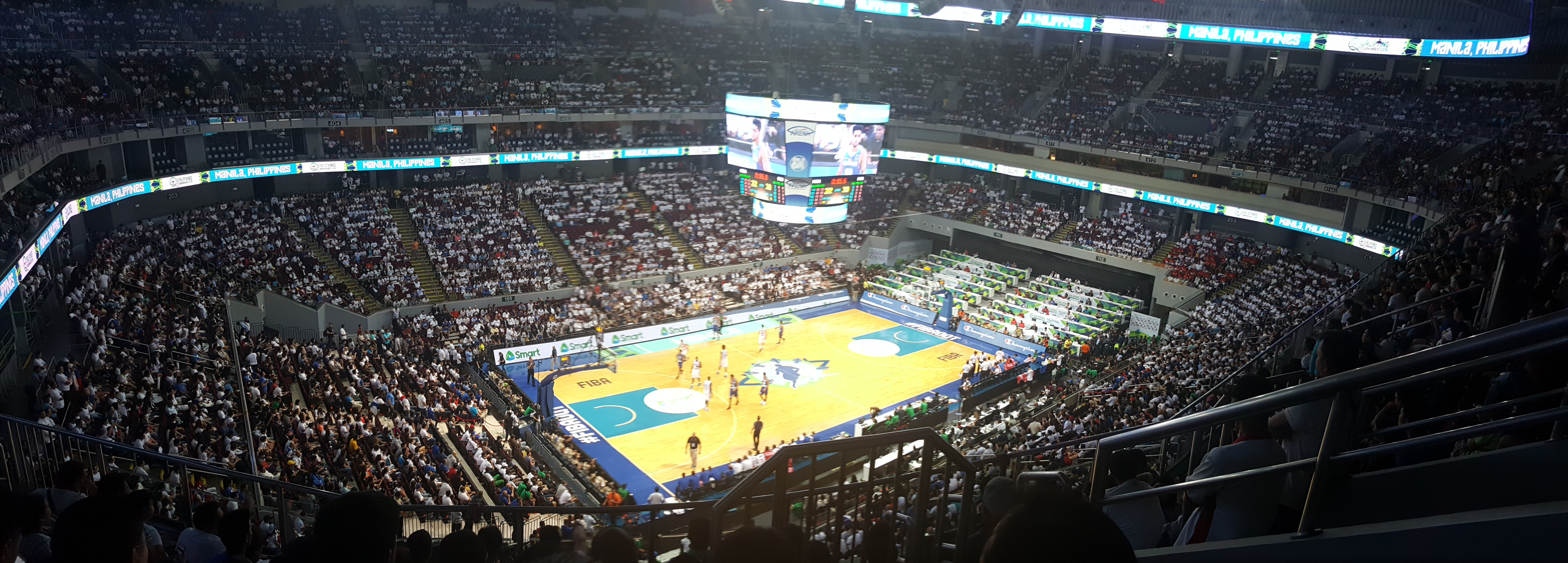
Panorama shot inside the Mall of Asia Arena during the game between the Philippines and France.

5 July 2016
21:00

Boxscore

France	93–84	Philippines
Scoring by quarter: 22–30, 23–13, 32–23, 16–18
Pts: De Colo 27; Rebs: Diaw 9 Asts: Diaw, Parker 6		Pts: Blatche 21; Rebs: Rosario 9 Asts: William 3

Mall of Asia Arena, Pasay
Attendance: 15,000
Referees: Luigi Lamonica (ITA), Michael Aylen (AUS), Elias Koromilas (GRE)

6 July 2016
21:00

Boxscore

Philippines	80–89	New Zealand
Scoring by quarter: 17–21, 14–17, 22–22, 27–29
Pts: Blatche 30; Rebs: Blatche, Norwood 7 Asts: Norwood, William 3		Pts: T. Webster 25; Rebs: T. Webster 11; Asts: Ili 4

Mall of Asia Arena, Pasay
Attendance: 13,000
Referees: Saša Pukl (SLO), Elias Koromilas (GRE), Miguel Pérez (ESP)

7 July 2016
21:00

Boxscore

New Zealand	59–66	France
Scoring by quarter: 14–13, 17–10, 17–15, 11–28
Pts: C. Webster 21; Rebs: Vukona 12; Asts: C. Webster 3		Pts: Gelabale 11; Rebs: Diaw 6 Asts: Heurtel 4

Mall of Asia Arena, Pasay
Attendance: 6,000
Referees: Luigi Lamonica (ITA), Michael Aylen (AUS), Elias Koromilas (GRE)

== Knockout phase ==
Semifinals
9 July
Canada	78
New Zealand	72
9 July
France	75
Turkey	63

Final
10 July
Canada	74
France	83

=== Semifinals ===
9 July 2016
18:30

Boxscore

Canada	78–72	New Zealand
Scoring by quarter: 23–25, 19–17, 16–12, 20–18
Pts: Joseph 23; Rebs: Thompson 10; Asts: Joseph 4		Pts: C. Webster 21; Rebs: T. Webster 10; Asts: Loe, T. Webster 4

Mall of Asia Arena, Pasay
Attendance: 8,000
Referees: Saša Pukl (SLO), Elias Koromilas (GRE), Ferdinand Pascual (PHI)

9 July 2016
21:00

Boxscore

France	75–63	Turkey
Scoring by quarter: 18–16, 19–14, 16–13, 22–20
Pts: Heurtel 17; Rebs: Diaw 7 Asts: Heurtel 4		Pts: Aşık 19; Rebs: Erden 7 Asts: Arslan 5

Mall of Asia Arena, Pasay
Attendance: 13,000
Referees: Luigi Lamonica (ITA), Michael Aylen (AUS), Miguel Pérez (ESP)

=== Final ===
10 July 2016
21:00

Boxscore

Canada	74–83	France
Scoring by quarter: 25–30, 11–9, 15–17, 23–27
Pts: Joseph 20; Rebs: Thompson 7 Asts: Joseph 6		Pts: Parker 26; Rebs: De Colo 5 Asts: Diaw, Parker 4

Mall of Asia Arena, Pasay
Attendance: 13,000
Referees: Luigi Lamonica (ITA), Ferdinand Pascual (PHI), Saša Pukl (SLO)

== Final rankings ==
#	Team	W–L	Qualification
1st place, gold medalist(s)	France	4–0	Qualified for the Olympics
2nd place, silver medalist(s)	Canada	3–1	
3rd place, bronze medalist(s)	New Zealand	1–2	
4	Turkey	1–2	
5	Senegal	0–2	
6	Philippines	0–2	

== Statistical leaders ==
=== Players ===
Points

Pos.	Name	PPG
1	(Philippines) Andray Blatche	25.5
2	(New Zealand) Corey Webster	21.7
3	(Canada) Cory Joseph	19.3
4	(France) Nando De Colo	17.3
5	(New Zealand) Tai Webster	16.3

Rebounds

Pos.	Name	RPG
1	(Senegal) Maurice Ndour	10.5
2	(New Zealand) Tai Webster	9.7
3	(Turkey) Semih Erden	8.7
4	(Canada) Tristan Thompson	8.3
5	(New Zealand) Mika Vukona	7.5

Assists

Pos.	Name	APG
1	(Canada) Cory Joseph	4.3
2	(Senegal) Clevin Hannah	4.0
3	(France) Tony Parker	3.5
3	(Senegal) Thierno Niang	3.5
5	(France) Boris Diaw	3.3

Steals

Pos.	Name	SPG
1	(France) Nando De Colo	2.3
2	(Turkey) Sinan Güler	1.7
3	(Philippines) Andray Blatche	1.5
4	(Turkey) Semih Erden	1.3
4	(France) Boris Diaw	1.3
4	(France) Thomas Heurtel	1.3
4	(Canada) Cory Joseph	1.3

Blocks

Pos.	Name	BPG
1	(Senegal) Maurice Ndour	2.5
2	(Senegal) Cheikh Mbodj	2.0
3	(Canada) Melvin Ejim	1.0
3	(New Zealand) Thomas Abercrombie	1.0
3	(Canada) Khem Birch	1.0
3	(Philippines) Andray Blatche	1.0

Other statistical leaders

Stat	Name	Avg.
Field goal percentage	(France) Nando de Colo	58.5%
3-point FG percentage	(New Zealand) Isaac Fotu	57.1%
Free throw percentage	(New Zealand) Corey Webster	100.0%
Turnovers	(Philippines) Andray Blatche (Canada) Cory Joseph	3.5
Fouls	(New Zealand) Mika Vukona	5.0

=== Teams ===
Points

Pos.	Name	PPG
1	Philippines	82.0
2	France	79.3
3	New Zealand	73.3
4	Canada	71.8
5	Turkey	66.7

Rebounds

Pos.	Name	RPG
1	Senegal	52.0
2	New Zealand	41.7
3	Canada	41.5
4	Turkey	37.7
5	Philippines	36.0

Assists

Pos.	Name	APG
1	France	15.3
2	New Zealand	14.0
2	Turkey	14.0
4	Canada	12.8
5	Senegal	12.0

Steals

Pos.	Name	SPG
1	France	8.5
2	Turkey	6.0
3	New Zealand	5.0
4	Philippines	4.0
5	Canada	3.8

Blocks

Pos.	Name	BPG
1	Senegal	5.0
2	Canada	3.3
3	New Zealand	3.0
4	Philippines	2.0
5	France	1.3

Other statistical leaders

Stat	Name	Avg.
Field goal percentage	France	41.0%
3-point FG percentage	Philippines	40.0%
Free throw percentage	France	83.1%
Turnovers	Senegal	17.5
Fouls	Senegal	26.5

== Issues ==
=== Reception to the Haka ===
Fans booing the New Zealand squad as it performed its Haka drew a mixed reception. However, the New Zealand team stated that it had no issue with the reaction, as "Different people react in different ways to it."

== Marketing ==
=== Broadcasting ===
The following table lists the broadcasters of the participating teams .

Country	Broadcaster
Canada	TSN
France	Canal+
New Zealand	Māori TV
Philippines	TV5
Senegal	Canal + Sport; SuperSport
Turkey	NTV

=== Side Events ===
==== The March to MOA ====
On the afternoon of July 5, day 1 of the tournament, a street parade called The March to MOA (Mall of Asia Arena) was held to open the tournament's festivities. The parade proceeded through the streets of the SM Mall of Asia precinct towards the Mall of Asia Arena. It highlighted Filipino culture and featured floats representing the six participating nations and FIBA, as well as cultural dance and drummer groups from across the Philippines.

==== The Global Village ====
A Global Village fan zone was erected beside the Mall of Asia Arena, where fans could visit booths representing each of the participating countries, featuring food, music and culture.

The Village Central consisted of a registration area where visitors could obtain a passport for the village, get money or chits to buy food in the village, and purchase souvenir merchandise from all six participating countries.

== See also ==
- 2016 FIBA World Olympic Qualifying Tournaments for Men
- 2016 FIBA World Olympic Qualifying Tournament – Belgrade
- 2016 FIBA World Olympic Qualifying Tournament – Turin
