= Milan Minić (basketball) =

Serbian basketball coach (born 1954)

Milan Minić Милан Минић
Crvena zvezda
- Position: Assistant coach
- League: KLS; ABA League; EuroLeague

Personal information
- Born: 4 December 1954 (age 71) Ljubljana, SFR Yugoslavia

Career history

Coaching
- 22 December (women's)
- Crvena zvezda (women's)
- IMT
- Spartak Subotica (women's)
- 1989–1991: Voždovac (women's) (assistant)
- 1991–1993: PAOK (assistant)
- 1994–1996: Panionios (assistant)
- 1996–1999: Olympiacos (assistant)
- 1999–2001: AEK Athens (assistant)
- 2002: Aris Thessaloniki
- 2003–2004: RheinEnergie Köln
- 2004: Olympiacos
- 2004–2005: Olympiacos (assistant)
- 2006–2007: Armani Milano (assistant)
- 2007–2008: Lokomotiv Rostov
- 2008–2009: Vojvodina Srbijagas
- 2009–2010: CSKA Moscow (assistant)
- 2012–2013: El Jaish
- 2013–2019: Serbia (assistant)
- 2013–2014: Aris Thessaloniki
- 2015–2016: Panathinaikos (assistant)
- 2018: Partizan (assistant)
- 2025–2026: Crvena zvezda (assistant)

Career highlights
- As assistant coach: EuroLeague champion (1997); FIBA Saporta Cup champion (2000); 2× Greek League champion (1992, 1997); 4× Greek Cup winner (1997, 2000, 2001, 2016); VTB United League champion (2010); Russian League champion (2010); Russian Cup winner (2010); Serbian Cup winner (2026)
Medals
Men's Basketball
Assistant coach for Serbia and Montenegro
FIBA World Cup
Gold medal – first place	1998 Greece	Team
EuroBasket
Gold medal – first place	2001 Turkey	Team
Gold medal – first place	1995 Greece	Team
Assistant coach for Serbia
Summer Olympics
Silver medal – second place	2016 Rio de Janeiro	Team
FIBA World Cup
Silver medal – second place	2014 Spain	Team
EuroBasket
Silver medal – second place	2017 Turkey	Team

Milan Minić (Serbian Cyrillic: Милан Минић, born 4 December 1954) is a Serbian professional basketball coach who last worked as assistant coach for KK Crvena zvezda of the Basketball League of Serbia (KLS), the ABA League and the EuroLeague.

== Coaching career (men's basketball) ==
Minić was an assistant coach of Serbian coach Dušan Ivković in the Greek League from 1991 to 2001. During that time, he was a part of staff in the PAOK, Panionios, Olympiacos and AEK Athens. In 2002, he became head coach of the Aris Thessaloniki. Later, he was coach for the RheinEnergie Köln of the Basketball Bundesliga, the Lokomotiv Rostov of the Russian Super League 1, the Vojvodina Srbijagas of the Serbian Super League and the Adriatic League and for the El Jaish of Qatari League.

Minić was an assistant coach of Serbian coach Aleksandar Đorđević for two seasons, during 2006-07 Italian League season with the Armani Milano and during 2015–2016 Greek League season with the Panathinaikos.

=== National team ===
Minić was an assistant coach of Dušan Ivković, Željko Obradović and Svetislav Pešić in the national team of Serbia and Montenegro, with whom he won three gold medals (EuroBasket 1995 and the 1998 FIBA World Championship in Greece, and EuroBasket 2001 in Turkey).

Minić was an assistant coach of Aleksandar Đorđević in the Serbia national team, with whom he won three silver medals (2014 Basketball World Cup in Spain, at the Summer Olympics in Rio de Janeiro and EuroBasket 2017 in Turkey).

== Coaching career (women's basketball) ==
Minić coached 22 December, Crvena zvezda and Voždovac from Belgrade and Spartak from Subotica of the Yugoslav Women's League.

== Career achievements ==
=== As an assistant coach ===
Club competitions

- EuroLeague: 1 (with Olympiacos: 1996–97)
- FIBA Saporta Cup: 1 (with AEK: 1999–00)
- Greek League: 2 (with PAOK: 1991–92 and Olympiacos: 1996–97)
- Greek Cup: 4 (with Olympiacos: 1996–97, with AEK: 1999–00, 2000–01 and Panathinaikos: 2015–16)
- VTB United League: 1 (with CSKA Moscow: 2009–10)
- Russian League: 1 (with CSKA Moscow: 2009–10)
- Russian Cup: 1 (with CSKA Moscow: 2009–10)
- Serbian Cup: 1 (with Crvena zvezda: 2025–26)

National team competitions

- 2016 Summer Olympics: Silver
- EuroBasket 1995: Gold
- EuroBasket 2001: Gold
- EuroBasket 2017: Silver
- 1998 FIBA World Championship: Gold
- 2014 FIBA World Cup: Silver
