= 2016 FIBA World Olympic Qualifying Tournament – Turin =

2016 FIBA World Olympic Qualifying Tournament for Men
Turin, Italy

Tournament details
- Host country: Italy
- Dates: 4–9 July
- Teams: 6 (from 4 federations)
- Venue: 1 (in 1 host city)

Final positions
- Champions: Croatia

Tournament statistics
- MVP: (Croatia) Dario Šarić
- Top scorer: (Croatia) Bojan Bogdanović (24.3)
- Top rebounds: (Croatia) Dario Šarić (10.0)
- Top assists: (Greece) Nick Calathes (5.3)
- PPG (Team): Greece (75.0)
- RPG (Team): Italy (42.8)
- APG (Team): Greece (17.0)

Official website
- OQT Italy

The 2016 FIBA World Olympic Qualifying Tournament in Turin was one of three 2016 FIBA World Olympic Qualifying Tournaments for Men. The tournament was held at the Pala Alpitour in Turin, Italy, from 4 to 9 July 2016. The national teams of Greece, Mexico, Iran, Tunisia, Croatia, and hosts Italy were drawn into the tournament. Croatia qualified for the 2016 Summer Olympics after defeating hosts Italy in the final.

== Teams ==
Team	Qualification	Date of qualification	FIBA World Ranking
Greece	EuroBasket 2015 5th place	15 September 2015	10
Mexico	2015 FIBA Americas Championship 4th place	12 September 2015	19
Iran	2015 FIBA Asia Championship 3rd place	3 October 2015	17
Tunisia	AfroBasket 2015 3rd place	30 August 2015	23
Croatia (Note: Croatia later qualified for the tournament, together with Latvia, when Italy and Serbia were announced as two of the Olympic qualifying tournament hosts.)	EuroBasket 2015 9th place	18 August 2015	12
Italy (Note: Italy also qualified by virtue of being the 6th placers at EuroBasket 2015.)	Hosts, EuroBasket 2015 6th place	19 January 2016	T-35

== Venue ==
The Pala Alpitour was chosen as the main venue for the tournament. The arena hosted the ice hockey events at the 2006 Winter Olympics

Turin	2016 FIBA World Olympic Qualifying Tournament – Turin (Italy)
Pala Alpitour	2016 FIBA World Olympic Qualifying Tournament – Turin (Italy)
Capacity: 16,600	2016 FIBA World Olympic Qualifying Tournament – Turin (Italy)

== Referees ==
The following referees were selected for the tournament.

- (Cameroon) Arnaud Kom Njilo
- (Kazakhstan) Yevgeniy Mikheyev
- (Lithuania) Jurgis Laurinavičius
- (Puerto Rico) Jorge Vázquez
- (Slovenia) Matej Boltauzer
- (Spain) Emilio Pérez
- (Serbia) Milivoje Jovčić
- (Ukraine) Borys Shulga

== Preliminary round ==
All times are local (UTC+2).

=== Group A ===
Pos	Team	Pld	W	L	PF	PA	PD	Pts	Qualification
1	Greece	2	2	0	164	123	+41	4	Semifinals
2	Mexico	2	1	1	145	156	−11	3	Semifinals
3	Iran	2	0	2	123	153	−30	2	

Source: FIBA
Rules for classification: 1) Points; 2) Head-to-head results; 3) Points difference; 4) Points scored.

4 July 2016
18:00

Boxscore

Greece	78–53	Iran
Scoring by quarter: 27–21, 21–10, 18–16, 12–6
Pts: G. Antetokounmpo 16; Rebs: Papapetrou 6 Asts: Calathes 6		Pts: Haddadi 16; Rebs: Sahakian 8 Asts: Jamshidi 5

Pala Alpitour, Turin
Attendance: 7,500
Referees: Jorge Vázquez (PUR), Emilio Pérez (ESP), Borys Shulga (UKR)

5 July 2016
18:00

Boxscore

Iran	70–75	Mexico
Scoring by quarter: 14–17, 12–19, 21–17, 23–22
Pts: Yakhchali 20; Rebs: Kazemi 9 Asts: four players 3		Pts: Cruz 18; Rebs: Hernández 8 Asts: Stoll 4

Pala Alpitour, Turin
Attendance: 7,150
Referees: Matej Boltauzer (SLO), Jurgis Laurinavičius (LTU), Yevgeniy Mikheyev (KAZ)

6 July 2016
18:00

Boxscore

Mexico	70–86	Greece
Scoring by quarter: 16–15, 19–18, 13–27, 22–26
Pts: Cruz 19; Rebs: I. Gutiérrez 11; Asts: Méndez 5		Pts: G. Antetokounmpo 21; Rebs: Bourousis 9 Asts: Calathes 7

Pala Alpitour, Turin
Attendance: 1,728
Referees: Jorge Vázquez (PUR), Milivoje Jovčić (SRB), Borys Shulga (UKR)

=== Group B ===
Pos	Team	Pld	W	L	PF	PA	PD	Pts	Qualification
1	Italy (H)	2	2	0	135	101	+34	4	Semifinals
2	Croatia	2	1	1	132	119	+13	3	Semifinals
3	Tunisia	2	0	2	93	140	−47	2	

Source: FIBA
Rules for classification: 1) Points; 2) Head-to-head results; 3) Points difference; 4) Points scored.
(H) Hosts

4 July 2016
21:00

Boxscore

Tunisia	41–68	Italy
Scoring by quarter: 12–19, 15–13, 2–22, 12–14
Pts: El Mabrouk 11; Rebs: Braa 9 Asts: Roll 5		Pts: Bargnani 15; Rebs: Gallinari 9 Asts: Cusin, Melli 3

Pala Alpitour, Turin
Attendance: 9,834
Referees: Matej Boltauzer (SLO), Milivoje Jovčić (SRB), Arnaud Kom Njilo (CMR)

5 July 2016
21:00

Boxscore

Italy	67–60	Croatia
Scoring by quarter: 21–23, 12–12, 21–12, 13–13
Pts: Belinelli 19; Rebs: Gallinari, Hackett 8 Asts: Gentile 4		Pts: Bogdanović 26; Rebs: Šarić 10; Asts: Šarić, Ukić 3

Pala Alpitour, Turin
Attendance: 11,872
Referees: Emilio Pérez (ESP), Milivoje Jovčić (SRB), Jorge Vázquez (PUR)

6 July 2016
21:00

Boxscore

Croatia	72–52	Tunisia
Scoring by quarter: 12–12, 17–12, 22–12, 21–16
Pts: Bogdanović 25; Rebs: Šarić 9 Asts: three players 3		Pts: Roll 21; Rebs: Ben Romdhane 9 Asts: Roll 5

Pala Alpitour, Turin
Attendance: 3,682
Referees: Matej Boltauzer (SLO), Jurgis Laurinavičius (LTU), Emilio Pérez (ESP)

== Knockout phase ==
Semifinals
8 July
Greece	61
Croatia	66
8 July
Italy	79
Mexico	54

Final
9 July
Croatia (OT)	84
Italy	78

=== Semifinals ===
8 July 2016
16:30

Boxscore

Greece	61–66	Croatia
Scoring by quarter: 13–31, 21–13, 15–8, 12–14
Pts: Perperoglou 13; Rebs: G. Antetokounmpo 9 Asts: G. Antetokounmpo 4		Pts: Bogdanović 20; Rebs: Šarić, Simon 8 Asts: Ukić 5

Pala Alpitour, Turin
Attendance: 5,618
Referees: Matej Boltauzer (SLO), Emilio Pérez (ESP), Borys Shulga (UKR)

8 July 2016
21:00

Boxscore

Italy	79–54	Mexico
Scoring by quarter: 19–13, 19–15, 20–13, 21–13
Pts: Gallinari 15; Rebs: Melli 6 Asts: Belinelli 4		Pts: Cruz 20; Rebs: Cruz 7 Asts: J. Gutiérrez 4

Pala Alpitour, Turin
Attendance: 10,083
Referees: Jorge Vázquez (PUR), Milivoje Jovčić (SRB), Jurgis Laurinavičius (LTU)

=== Final ===
9 July 2016
21:00

Boxscore

Croatia	84–78 (OT)	Italy
Scoring by quarter: 19–12, 20–22, 15–18, 16–18, Overtime: 14–8
Pts: Bogdanović 26; Rebs: Šarić 13; Asts: Hezonja 4		Pts: Belinelli 18; Rebs: Gallinari, Melli 8 Asts: three players 4

Pala Alpitour, Turin
Attendance: 12,074
Referees: Matej Boltauzer (SLO), Emilio Pérez (ESP), Jorge Vázquez (PUR)

== Final rankings ==
#	Team	W–L	Qualification
1st place, gold medalist(s)	Croatia	3–1	Qualified for the Olympics
2nd place, silver medalist(s)	Italy	3–1	
3rd place, bronze medalist(s)	Greece	2–1	
4	Mexico	1–2	
5	Iran	0–2	
6	Tunisia	0–2	

== Statistical leaders ==
=== Players ===
Points

Pos.	Name	PPG
1	(Croatia) Bojan Bogdanović	23.7
2	(Mexico) Francisco Cruz	19.0
3	(Iran) Behnam Yakhchali	16.0
4	(Greece) Giannis Antetokounmpo	15.3
5	(Tunisia) Michael Roll	15.0

Rebounds

Pos.	Name	RPG
1	(Croatia) Dario Šarić	9.0
2	(Italy) Danilo Gallinari	7.0
2	(Iran) Arsalan Kazemi	7.0
4	(Greece) Ioannis Bourousis	6.7
4	(Mexico) Héctor Hernández	6.7

Assists

Pos.	Name	APG
1	(Greece) Nick Calathes	5.3
2	(Tunisia) Michael Roll	5.0
3	(Mexico) Paul Stoll	3.7
3	(Croatia) Roko Ukić	3.7
5	(Iran) Mohammad Jamshidi	3.5

Steals

Pos.	Name	SPG
1	(Mexico) Jorge Gutiérrez	2.3
2	(Mexico) Paul Stoll	2.0
2	(Tunisia) Hamdi Braa	2.0
2	(Iran) Adnan Doraghi	2.0
5	(Greece) Nick Calathes	1.7

Blocks

Pos.	Name	BPG
1	(Greece) Giannis Antetokounmpo	2.0
2	(Tunisia) Mokhtar Ghyaza	1.5
3	(Greece) Thanasis Antetokounmpo	1.3
4	(Mexico) Lorenzo Mata	1.0
4	(Italy) Riccardo Cervi	1.0

Other statistical leaders

Stat	Name	Avg.
Field goal percentage	(Mexico) Francisco Cruz	55.0%
3-point FG percentage	(Italy) Pietro Aradori	83.3%
Free throw percentage	(Greece) Giannis Antetokounmpo (Tunisia) Michael Roll	100.0%
Turnovers	(Iran) Mohammad Jamshidi	5.5
Fouls	(Tunisia) Mehdi Seyeh	4.0

=== Teams ===
Points

Pos.	Name	PPG
1	Greece	75.0
2	Italy	71.3
3	Mexico	66.3
4	Croatia	66.0
5	Iran	61.5

Rebounds

Pos.	Name	RPG
1	Italy	44.0
2	Croatia	41.3
3	Greece	37.3
4	Mexico	33.7
5	Iran	33.0

Assists

Pos.	Name	APG
1	Greece	17.0
2	Italy	16.0
3	Iran	15.0
4	Mexico	14.0
5	Croatia	13.3

Steals

Pos.	Name	SPG
1	Greece	8.3
1	Mexico	8.3
3	Tunisia	7.5
4	Italy	7.3
5	Iran	4.5

Blocks

Pos.	Name	BPG
1	Greece	6.0
2	Mexico	3.0
3	Italy	2.7
4	Iran	2.0
4	Tunisia	2.0

Other statistical leaders

Stat	Name	Avg.
Field goal percentage	Greece	43.1%
3-point FG percentage	Iran	42.5%
Free throw percentage	Italy; Greece	73.8%
Turnovers	Iran	23.5
Fouls	Mexico	24.7

== Sponsors ==
Sponsors of the 2016 FIBA World Olympic Qualifying Tournament in Turin
Presenting Partner
- Barilla Group
Global Sponsors
- Champion
- Japan Airlines
- Molten Corporation
- Peak Sport Products
- Tissot
- Wanda Group
- Yanjing Beer

== See also ==
- 2016 FIBA World Olympic Qualifying Tournaments for Men
- 2016 FIBA World Olympic Qualifying Tournament – Belgrade
- 2016 FIBA World Olympic Qualifying Tournament – Manila
