= 2016 FIBA World Olympic Qualifying Tournament – Belgrade =

2016 FIBA World Olympic Qualifying Tournament for Men
Belgrade, Serbia

Tournament details
- Host country: Serbia
- Dates: 4–9 July
- Teams: 6 (from 4 federations)
- Venue: 1 (in 1 host city)

Final positions
- Champions: Serbia

Tournament statistics
- MVP: (Serbia) Nikola Jokić
- Top scorer: (Serbia) Bogdan Bogdanović (Serbia) Nikola Jokić (17.8)
- Top rebounds: (Serbia) Nikola Jokić (7.5)
- Top assists: (Czech Republic) Tomáš Satoranský (7.3)
- PPG (Team): Serbia (93.5)
- RPG (Team): Latvia (44.0)
- APG (Team): Serbia (28.5)

Official website
- OQT Serbia

The 2016 FIBA World Olympic Qualifying Tournament in Belgrade was one of three 2016 FIBA World Olympic Qualifying Tournaments for Men. The tournament was held at the Kombank Arena in Belgrade, Serbia, from 4 to 9 July 2016. The national teams of hosts Serbia, Angola, Puerto Rico, Japan, the Czech Republic, and Latvia were drawn into tournament. The winner qualified for the 2016 Summer Olympics.

== Teams ==
Team	Qualification	Date of qualification	FIBA World Ranking
Serbia (Note: Serbia also qualified by virtue of being the 4th placers at EuroBasket 2015.)	Hosts, EuroBasket 2015 4th place	19 January 2016	6
Angola	AfroBasket 2015 runner-up	30 August 2015	15
Puerto Rico	2015 FIBA Americas Championship 5th place	9 September 2015	16
Japan	2015 FIBA Asia Championship 4th place	3 October 2015	48
Czech Republic	EuroBasket 2015 7th place	18 September 2015	42
Latvia (Note: Latvia later qualified for the tournament, together with Croatia, when Italy and Serbia were announced as two of the Olympic qualifying tournament hosts.)	EuroBasket 2015 8th place	18 September 2015	T-35

== Venue ==
The Kombank Arena was chosen as the main venue for the tournament. The arena's location is in New Belgrade, but the host city will be designated as "Belgrade", since it is one of the city municipalities of the Serbian capital. The arena hosted the EuroBasket 2005.

Belgrade	2016 FIBA World Olympic Qualifying Tournament – Belgrade (Serbia)
Kombank Arena	2016 FIBA World Olympic Qualifying Tournament – Belgrade (Serbia)
Capacity: 25,000	2016 FIBA World Olympic Qualifying Tournament – Belgrade (Serbia)

== Referees ==
The following referees were selected for the tournament.

- (Canada) Michael Weiland
- (France) Joseph Bissang
- (Italy) Carmelo Paternico
- (Morocco) Samir Abaakil
- (Portugal) Fernando Rocha
- (Spain) Daniel Hierrezuelo
- (Turkey) Emin Moğulkoç
- (United States) Anthony Jordan

== Preliminary round ==
All times are local (UTC+2).

=== Group A ===
Pos	Team	Pld	W	L	PF	PA	PD	Pts	Qualification
1	Serbia (H)	2	2	0	170	141	+29	4	Semifinals
2	Puerto Rico	2	1	1	172	168	+4	3	Semifinals
3	Angola	2	0	2	141	174	−33	2	

Source: FIBA
Rules for classification: 1) Points; 2) Head-to-head results; 3) Points difference; 4) Points scored.
(H) Hosts

4 July 2016
21:00

Boxscore

Serbia	87–81	Puerto Rico
Scoring by quarter: 21–22, 20–9, 28–20, 18–30
Pts: Nedović 14; Rebs: Jokić 8 Asts: Teodosić 6		Pts: Holland 21; Rebs: Ramos 7 Asts: Barea 3

Kombank Arena, Belgrade
Attendance: 13,872
Referees: Daniel Hierrezuelo (ESP), Joseph Bissang (FRA), Michael Weiland (CAN)

5 July 2016
18:00

Boxscore

Puerto Rico	91–81	Angola
Scoring by quarter: 20–18, 26–15, 33–19, 12–29
Pts: Arroyo, Barea 18; Rebs: three players 5 Asts: Barea 7		Pts: Morais 21; Rebs: Ambrósio, Moore 6 Asts: four players 2

Kombank Arena, Belgrade
Attendance: 483
Referees: Daniel Hierrezuelo (ESP), Emin Moğulkoç (TUR), Michael Weiland (CAN)

6 July 2016
18:00

Boxscore

Angola	60–83	Serbia
Scoring by quarter: 23–30, 15–17, 13–22, 9–14
Pts: Moore 10; Rebs: Fernandes 6 Asts: Domingos, Santos 2		Pts: Jokić 17; Rebs: Jokić 6 Asts: Bogdanović 8

Kombank Arena, Belgrade
Attendance: 10,422
Referees: Joseph Bissang (FRA), Carmelo Paternico (ITA), Fernando Rocha (POR)

=== Group B ===
Pos	Team	Pld	W	L	PF	PA	PD	Pts	Qualification
1	Latvia	2	2	0	159	107	+52	4	Semifinals
2	Czech Republic	2	1	1	146	142	+4	3	Semifinals
3	Japan	2	0	2	119	175	−56	2	

Source: FIBA
Rules for classification: 1) Points; 2) Head-to-head results; 3) Points difference; 4) Points scored.

4 July 2016
18:00

Boxscore

Japan	48–88	Latvia
Scoring by quarter: 11–26, 12–20, 15–18, 10–24
Pts: K. Takeuchi 12; Rebs: four players 4 Asts: Tabuse 4		Pts: Bertāns 20; Rebs: J. Bērziņš 8 Asts: J. Bērziņš 6

Kombank Arena, Belgrade
Attendance: 1,352
Referees: Fernando Rocha (POR), Samir Abaakil (MAR), Emin Moğulkoç (TUR)

5 July 2016
21:00

Boxscore

Latvia	71–59	Czech Republic
Scoring by quarter: 13–20, 18–10, 20–15, 20–14
Pts: Bertāns 18; Rebs: four players 5 Asts: Strēlnieks 5		Pts: Schilb, Veselý 10; Rebs: Satoranský 8 Asts: Satoranský 8

Kombank Arena, Belgrade
Attendance: 1,473
Referees: Joseph Bissang (FRA), Fernando Rocha (POR), Carmelo Paternico (ITA)

6 July 2016
21:00

Boxscore

Czech Republic	87–71	Japan
Scoring by quarter: 23–14, 25–21, 21–16, 18–20
Pts: Palyza 22; Rebs: Auda 6 Asts: Satoranský 7		Pts: Tsuji 18; Rebs: J. Takeuchi, Watanabe 7 Asts: Tabuse 6

Kombank Arena, Belgrade
Attendance: 627
Referees: Daniel Hierrezuelo (ESP), Samir Abaakil (MAR), Michael Weiland (CAN)

== Knockout phase ==
Semifinals
8 July
Serbia	96
Czech Republic	72
8 July
Latvia	70
Puerto Rico	77

Final
9 July
Serbia	108
Puerto Rico	77

=== Semifinals ===
8 July 2016
18:00

Boxscore

Latvia	70–77	Puerto Rico
Scoring by quarter: 13–17, 17–16, 20–18, 20–26
Pts: Timma 16; Rebs: Pasečņiks 9 Asts: Bertāns 7		Pts: Holland 15; Rebs: Balkman 10; Asts: Arroyo, Barea 5

Kombank Arena, Belgrade
Attendance: 2,739
Referees: Joseph Bissang (FRA), Michael Weiland (CAN), Carmelo Paternico (ITA)

8 July 2016
21:00

Boxscore

Serbia	96–72	Czech Republic
Scoring by quarter: 26–17, 19–19, 28–22, 23–14
Pts: Bogdanović 21; Rebs: Bogdanović, Jokić 8 Asts: Raduljica, Teodosić 6		Pts: Satoranský 14; Rebs: Satoranský 7 Asts: Satoranský 7

Kombank Arena, Belgrade
Attendance: 12,793
Referees: Daniel Hierrezuelo (ESP), Fernando Rocha (POR), Emin Moğulkoç (TUR)

=== Final ===
9 July 2016
21:00

Boxscore

Serbia	108–77	Puerto Rico
Scoring by quarter: 37–11, 23–16, 22–29, 26–21
Pts: Bogdanović 26; Rebs: Jokić 8 Asts: Bogdanović 8		Pts: Barea 22; Rebs: Huertas, Vassallo 4 Asts: Arroyo 6

Kombank Arena, Belgrade
Attendance: 17,123
Referees: Daniel Hierrezuelo (ESP), Joseph Bissang (FRA), Michael Weiland (CAN)

== Final rankings ==
#	Team	W–L	Qualification
1st place, gold medalist(s)	Serbia	4–0	Qualified for the Olympics
2nd place, silver medalist(s)	Puerto Rico	2–2	
3rd place, bronze medalist(s)	Latvia	2–1	
4	Czech Republic	1–2	
5	Angola	0–2	
6	Japan	0–2	

== Statistical leaders ==
=== Players ===
Points

Pos.	Name	PPG
1	(Serbia) Bogdan Bogdanović	17.8
1	(Serbia) Nikola Jokić	17.8
3	(Latvia) Dairis Bertāns	16.3
4	(Puerto Rico) Jose Juan Barea	16.0
5	(Japan) Naoto Tsuji	14.5

Rebounds

Pos.	Name	RPG
1	(Serbia) Nikola Jokić	7.5
2	(Czech Republic) Tomáš Satoranský	6.3
3	(Latvia) Anžejs Pasečņiks	5.7
3	(Latvia) Jānis Timma	5.7
5	(Japan) Joji Takeuchi	5.5

Assists

Pos.	Name	APG
1	(Czech Republic) Tomáš Satoranský	7.3
2	(Serbia) Bogdan Bogdanović	6.0
3	(Serbia) Miloš Teodosić	5.5
4	(Japan) Yuta Tabuse	5.0
5	(Puerto Rico) Carlos Arroyo	4.5

Steals

Pos.	Name	SPG
1	(Angola) Carlos Morais	2.5
2	(Puerto Rico) John Holland	2.3
3	(Serbia) Stefan Jović	1.8
3	(Serbia) Nikola Kalinić	1.8
5	(Japan) Yuta Watanabe	1.5

Blocks

Pos.	Name	BPG
1	(Japan) Yuta Watanabe	1.5
2	(Latvia) Anžejs Pasečņiks	1.3
2	(Czech Republic) Jan Veselý	1.3
4	(Puerto Rico) Renaldo Balkman	1.0
4	(Latvia) Ojārs Siliņš	1.0
4	(Latvia) Jānis Timma	1.0

Other statistical leaders

Stat	Name	Avg.
Field goal percentage	(Serbia) Nikola Jokić	69.0%
3-point FG percentage	(Puerto Rico) Carlos Arroyo	66.7%
Free throw percentage	(Puerto Rico) John Holland	93.8%
Turnovers	(Angola) Carlos Morais	5.0
Fouls	(Puerto Rico) Ricky Sánchez	4.0

=== Teams ===
Points

Pos.	Name	PPG
1	Serbia	93.5
2	Puerto Rico	81.5
3	Latvia	76.3
4	Czech Republic	72.7
5	Angola	70.5

Rebounds

Pos.	Name	RPG
1	Latvia	44.0
2	Angola	39.5
3	Puerto Rico	37.5
4	Czech Republic	37.3
5	Serbia	34.5

Assists

Pos.	Name	APG
1	Serbia	28.5
2	Czech Republic	23.7
3	Latvia	18.3
4	Puerto Rico	15.3
5	Japan	12.0

Steals

Pos.	Name	SPG
1	Serbia	9.0
2	Puerto Rico	8.5
3	Latvia	7.3
4	Angola	6.5
5	Czech Republic	5.3

Blocks

Pos.	Name	BPG
1	Latvia	4.7
2	Czech Republic	4.3
3	Puerto Rico	2.0
3	Japan	2.0
5	Serbia	1.8

Other statistical leaders

Stat	Name	Avg.
Field goal percentage	Serbia	54.6%
3-point FG percentage	Serbia	42.4%
Free throw percentage	Japan	79.2%
Turnovers	Angola	18.5
Fouls	Angola	26.0

== Broadcasting ==
Country	Broadcaster
Angola	Canal + Sport; SuperSport
Czech Republic	Czech Television
Japan	Fuji TV
Latvia	TV6
Puerto Rico	Telemundo
Serbia	Sport Klub; RTS

== Sponsors ==
Sponsors of the 2016 FIBA World Olympic Qualifying Tournament in Belgrade
Presenting Partner
- Beograd
Global Sponsors
- Champion
- Japan Airlines
- Molten Corporation
- Peak Sport Products
- Tissot
- Wanda Group
- Yanjing Beer
Event Sponsors
- Komercijalna banka
- Roda
- mts
- Ministarstvo omladine i sporta
- Triglav osiguranje

== See also ==
- 2016 Serbia OQT basketball team
- 2016 FIBA World Olympic Qualifying Tournaments for Men
- 2016 FIBA World Olympic Qualifying Tournament – Manila
- 2016 FIBA World Olympic Qualifying Tournament – Turin
