= SD Crvena zvezda =

Multi-sport club in Belgrade, Serbia

- Nicknames: Црвено-бели (The Red & Whites); Звезда (The Star)
- Sports: 35 clubs in 31 different sports
- Founded: 4 March 1945; 81 years ago
- Based in: Belgrade, Serbia
- Colors: Red and White
- Anthem: Svečana pesma Crvene zvezde
- Chairman: Zvezdan Terzić
- Official fan club: Delije
- Website: sd-crvenazvezda.net

Sportsko društvo Crvena zvezda (Serbian Cyrillic: Спортско друштво Црвена звезда, lit. 'Red Star Sports Society'), commonly abbreviated as SD Crvena zvezda (Serbian Cyrillic: СД Црвена звезда) and commonly known in English as Red Star Belgrade, is a multi-sport club from Belgrade, Serbia.

SD Crvena zvezda's clubs have won 929 trophies, including 5 Intercontinental trophies, 13 European trophies, 19 Regional trophies, 625 National Leagues, 245 National Cups and 22 National Super Cups and League Cups. SD Crvena zvezda's athletes have won 43 Olympic medals, including 7 gold, 23 silver and 13 bronze medals.

SD Crvena zvezda is the most successful multi-sport club in Serbia.

== Clubs ==
SD Crvena zvezda has sport clubs in the following disciplines:

Sport	Club name	Founded
Athletics	Atletski klub Crvena zvezda	1945
Auto racing	Automobilski karting sportski klub Crvena zvezda	1946
Basketball	Košarkaški klub Crvena zvezda Ženski košarkaški klub Crvena zvezda	1945; 1945
Bowling	Kuglaški klub Crvena zvezda	1953
Boxing	Bokserski klub Crvena zvezda	1952
Chess	Šahovski klub Crvena zvezda	1945
Cycling	Biciklistički klub Crvena zvezda	1947
Esports	Esport klub Crvena zvezda	2017
Fencing	Mačevalački klub Crvena zvezda	1946
Football	Fudbalski klub Crvena zvezda Ženski fudbalski klub Crvena zvezda	1945; 2011
Futsal	Klub malog fudbala Crvena zvezda	2019
Handball	Rukometni klub Crvena zvezda Ženski rukometni klub Crvena zvezda	1948; 1995
Ice hockey	Sportski klub za hokej na ledu Crvena zvezda	1946
Judo	Džudo klub Crvena zvezda	1955
Karate	Karate klub Crvena zvezda	1972
Kickboxing	Kik boks klub Crvena zvezda	1995
Mixed martial arts	MMA klub Crvena zvezda	2014
Rowing	Veslački klub Crvena zvezda	1922
Rugby league	Ragbi liga klub Crvena zvezda	2006
Rugby union	Beogradski ragbi klub Crvena zvezda	1982
Shooting sports	Streljački klub Crvena zvezda	1980
Skiing	Skijaški klub Crvena zvezda	1946
Swimming	Plivački klub Crvena zvezda	1946
Table tennis	Stonoteniski klub Crvena zvezda	1945
Taekwondo	Tekvondo klub Crvena zvezda	1994
Tennis	Teniski klub Crvena zvezda	1946
Volleyball	Odbojkaški klub Crvena zvezda	1945
Water polo	Vaterpolo klub Crvena zvezda Ženski vaterpolo klub Crvena zvezda	1945; 2013
Weightlifting	Klub dizača tegova Crvena zvezda	1996
Wrestling	Rvački klub Crvena zvezda	1953
3x3 basketball	BK 3x3 Crvena zvezda	2026

== Honours and achievements ==
=== Athletics ===
==== Men ====
- National Championships
  - Winners (41): 1953, 1954, 1955, 1967, 1968, 1969, 1970, 1971, 1972, 1973, 1974, 1975, 1976, 1977, 1978, 1979, 1980, 1981, 1982, 1983, 1985, 1986, 1987, 1988, 1989, 1990, 1992, 1993, 1994, 1995, 2002, 2008, 2009, 2010, 2011, 2017, 2018, 2019, 2020, 2021, 2026
- National Cups
  - Winners (47): 1966, 1967, 1968, 1969, 1970, 1971, 1972, 1973, 1974, 1975, 1976, 1977, 1978, 1979, 1980, 1981, 1982, 1983, 1984, 1985, 1986, 1987, 1988, 1989, 1990, 1992, 1993, 1994, 1995, 2002, 2003, 2004, 2005, 2006, 2007, 2008, 2009, 2010, 2011, 2012, 2015, 2016, 2019, 2023, 2024, 2025, 2026
- Cross country running
  - Winners (19): 1948, 1953, 1954, 1959, 1960, 1971, 1972, 1973, 1977, 1979, 1980, 1985, 1986, 1992, 1993, 1994, 2006, 2020, 2022
- European Champion Clubs Cup
  - Winners (1): 1989

==== Women ====
- National Championships
  - Winners (27): 1986, 1987, 1988, 1989, 1992, 1993, 1994, 1995, 2002, 2007, 2008, 2009, 2010, 2011, 2012, 2013, 2014, 2015, 2017, 2018, 2019, 2020, 2021, 2023, 2024, 2025, 2026
- National Cups
  - Winners (24): 1986, 1987, 1988, 1989, 1992, 1993, 1994, 2002, 2003, 2004, 2005, 2006, 2008, 2009, 2010, 2011, 2013, 2014, 2015, 2016, 2019, 2023, 2024, 2026
- Cross country running
  - Winners (7): 1982, 1993, 2002, 2017, 2018, 2019, 2026

=== Auto racing ===
National Championships – 11

- Oval track racing
  - Winners (5): 1974, 1988, 2017, 2018, 2019
- Rallying
  - Winners (2): 1974, 1975
- Kart racing
  - Winners (4): 2017, 2018, 2020, 2022

=== Basketball ===
==== KK Crvena zvezda ====
National Championships – 24 (record)

- Yugoslav League
  - Winners (12): 1946, 1947, 1948, 1949, 1950, 1951, 1952, 1953, 1954, 1955, 1968–69, 1971–72
- Serbia and Montenegro League
  - Winners (3): 1992–93, 1993–94, 1997–98
- Serbian League
  - Winners (9): 2014–15, 2015–16, 2016–17, 2017–18, 2018–19, 2020–21, 2021–22, 2022–23, 2023–24

National Cups – 15

- Yugoslav Cup
  - Winners (3): 1970–71, 1972–73, 1974–75
- Radivoj Korać Cup
  - Winners (12): 2003–04, 2005–06, 2012–13, 2013–14, 2014–15, 2016–17, 2020–21, 2021–22, 2022–23, 2023–24, 2024–25, 2025-26

National Super Cup – 1

- FR Yugoslav Super Cup
  - Winners (1): 1993

International titles – 9

- FIBA Saporta Cup
  - Winners (1): 1973–74
- ABA League
  - Winners (7): 2014–15, 2015–16, 2016–17, 2018–19, 2020–21, 2021–22, 2023–24
- ABA League Supercup
  - Winners (1): 2018

==== ŽKK Crvena zvezda ====
National Championships – 36 (record)

- Yugoslav League
  - Winners (25): 1946, 1947, 1948, 1949, 1950, 1951, 1952, 1953, 1954, 1955, 1956, 1957, 1958, 1959, 1960, 1963, 1972–73, 1975–76, 1976–77, 1977–78, 1978–79, 1979–80, 1980–81, 1988–89, 1991–92
- Serbia and Montenegro League
  - Winners (3): 1992–93, 1995–96, 2003–04
- Serbian League
  - Winners (8): 2016–17, 2017–18, 2018–19, 2020–21, 2021–22, 2022–23, 2024–25, 2025-26

National Cups – 17 (record)

- Yugoslav Cup
  - Winners (6): 1972–73, 1973–74, 1975–76, 1978–79, 1980–81, 1991–92
- Serbia and Montenegro Cup
  - Winners (4): 1993–94, 1994–95, 2002–03, 2003–04
- Milan Ciga Vasojević Cup
  - Winners (7): 2015–16, 2016–17, 2018–19, 2021–22, 2022–23, 2024–25, 2026

International titles – 1

- EuroLeague Women
  - Winners (1): 1978–79

=== Bowling ===
- National Championships
  - Winners (7): 1991–92, 1992–93, 1998–99, 2001–02, 2002–03, 2003–04, 2022–23
- National Cups
  - Winners (1): 1985

=== Boxing ===
==== Men ====
- National Championships
  - Winners (4): 1967, 1969, 1970, 2026
- Regional League
  - Winners (1): 2021–22
- EUBC European Champions Cup
  - Winners (1): 2025

==== Women ====
- National Championships
  - Winners (1): 2023

=== Bridge ===
- National Championships
  - Winners (5): 1996, 2001, 2008, 2015, 2020
- National Cups
  - Winners (2): 1997, 1998

=== Chess ===
==== Men ====
- National Championships
  - Winners (10): 1947, 1948, 1950, 1967, 1968, 1970, 1975, 1976, 1977, 1981
- National Cups
  - Winners (8): 1966, 1969, 1970, 1972, 1973, 1975, 1976, 1986

==== Women ====
- National Championships
  - Winners (3): 2023, 2024, 2025
- National Cups
  - Winners (2): 1983, 1992

=== Fencing ===
==== Men ====
National Championships – 59 (record)

- Épée
  - Winners (12): 1950, 1951, 1958, 1964, 2001, 2003, 2004, 2016, 2019, 2024, 2025, 2026
- Foil
  - Winners (12): 1951, 1952, 1958, 1960, 2001, 2002, 2021, 2022, 2023, 2024, 2025, 2026
- Sabre
  - Winners (35): 1970, 1972, 1974, 1975, 1976, 1977, 1978, 1979, 1980, 1981, 1982, 1983, 1988, 1989, 1991, 1992, 1995, 1996, 1997, 1998, 1999, 2000, 2001, 2002, 2003, 2007, 2009, 2010, 2011, 2012, 2013, 2015, 2016, 2017, 2018

National Cups – 5

- Sabre
  - Winners (5): 1981, 1984, 1991, 1992, 1993

International titles – 1

- European Cup of Club Champions
  - Winners (1): 2025 (Foil)

==== Women ====
National Championships – 58 (record)

- Foil
  - Winners (40): 1952, 1954, 1956, 1957, 1959, 1960, 1961, 1965, 1966, 1967, 1968, 1970, 1971, 1974, 1976, 1979, 1991, 2002, 2003, 2005, 2006, 2007, 2008, 2009, 2010, 2011, 2012, 2013, 2014, 2016, 2017, 2018, 2019, 2020, 2021, 2022, 2023, 2024, 2025, 2026
- Épée
  - Winners (12): 1991, 2002, 2003, 2004, 2007, 2008, 2009, 2010, 2011, 2012, 2013, 2019
- Sabre
  - Winners (6): 2009, 2010, 2011, 2012, 2015, 2026

National Cups – 4

- Épée
  - Winners (2): 1989, 1990
- Foil
  - Winners (2): 1990, 1991

=== Football ===
==== FK Crvena zvezda ====
National Championships – 37 (record)

- People's Republic of Serbia League
  - Winners (1): 1945–46
- Yugoslav First League
  - Winners (19): 1951, 1952–53, 1955–56, 1956–57, 1958–59, 1959–60, 1963–64, 1967–68, 1968–69, 1969–70, 1972–73, 1976–77, 1979–80, 1980–81, 1983–84, 1987–88, 1989–90, 1990–91, 1991–92
- First League of Serbia and Montenegro
  - Winners (5): 1994–95, 1999–2000, 2000–01, 2003–04, 2005–06
- Serbian SuperLiga
  - Winners (12): 2006–07, 2013–14, 2015–16, 2017–18, 2018–19, 2019–20, 2020–21, 2021–22, 2022–23, 2023–24, 2024–25, 2025-26

National Cups – 30 (record)

- Yugoslav Cup
  - Winners (12): 1948, 1949, 1950, 1957–58, 1958–59, 1963–64, 1967–68, 1969–70, 1970–71, 1981–82, 1984–85, 1989–90
- Serbia and Montenegro Cup
  - Winners (9): 1992–93, 1994–95, 1995–96, 1996–97, 1998–99, 1999–2000, 2001–02, 2003–04, 2005–06
- Serbian Cup
  - Winners (9): 2006–07, 2009–10, 2011–12, 2020–21, 2021–22, 2022–23, 2023–24, 2024–25, 2025-26

National Super Cups – 2 (record)

- Yugoslav Super Cup
  - Winners (2): 1969, 1971

National League Cup – 1 (shared record)

- Yugoslav League Cup
  - Winners (1): 1972–73

National Champions League – 2 (record)

- Yugoslav Summer Champions League
  - Winners (2): 1971, 1973

International titles – 4

- European Cup / UEFA Champions League
  - Winners (1): 1990–91
- Intercontinental Cup
  - Winners (1): 1991
- Mitropa Cup
  - Winners (2): 1958, 1967–68

==== ŽFK Crvena zvezda ====
- Serbian Super League
  - Winners (3): 2023–24, 2024–25, 2025-26
- Serbian Cup
  - Winners (4): 2017–18, 2023–24, 2024–25, 2025-26

=== Futsal ===
- Serbian Prva Futsal Liga
  - Winners (1): 2019–20

=== Golf ===
- National Championships
  - Winners (1): 2022

=== Handball ===
==== RK Crvena zvezda ====
National Championships – 9

- Yugoslav League
  - Winners (2): 1954–55, 1955–56
- Serbia and Montenegro League
  - Winners (5): 1995–96, 1996–97, 1997–98, 2003–04, 2005–06
- Serbian League
  - Winners (2): 2006–07, 2007–08

National Cups – 5

- Yugoslav Cup
  - Winners (1): 1955–56
- Serbia and Montenegro Cup
  - Winners (3): 1994–95, 1995–96, 2003–04
- Serbian Cup
  - Winners (1): 2016–17

National Super Cup – 1

- Serbian Super Cup
  - Winners (1): 2017

==== ŽRK Crvena zvezda ====
- Serbian League
  - Winners (3): 2023–24, 2024–25, 2025-26
- Serbian Cup
  - Winners (3): 2023–24, 2024–25, 2025-26
- Serbian Super Cup
  - Winners (2): 2025, 2026
- All-Serbian Cup
  - Winners (2): 2024, 2026

=== Ice hockey ===
National Championships – 13

- Serbian Hockey League
  - Winners (13): 1991–92, 1992–93, 1995–96, 1996–97, 2004–05, 2018, 2019, 2020, 2021, 2023, 2024, 2025, 2026

National Cups – 5 (record)

- Yugoslav Ice Hockey Cup
  - Winners (1): 1980
- Serbian Hockey Cup
  - Winners (4): 1992, 1996, 1997, 1998

International titles – 1

- International Hockey League
  - Winners (1): 2018–19

=== Judo ===
==== Men ====
- National Championships
  - Winners (11): 1989, 1991, 1995, 2016, 2018, 2019, 2021, 2022, 2023, 2024, 2025
- National Cups
  - Winners (2): 1989, 1991

==== Women ====
- National Championships
  - Winners (5): 2018, 2019, 2021, 2022, 2024

=== Karate ===
==== Men ====
- National Championships
  - Winners (14): 1981, 1990 (2×), 1997, 2019, 2020 (2×), 2022 (2×), 2023 (2×), 2024 (2×), 2025
- National Cups
  - Winners (2): 1996, 1997
- European Club Championship
  - Winners (4): 1997, 1998, 2021, 2024
- Intercontinental Club Championship
  - Winners (4): 2013, 2015, 2025 (2×)
- Mediterranean Club Championship
  - Winners (2): 2016 (2×)

==== Women ====
- National Championships
  - Winners (4): 1980, 1981, 1983, 2024
- National Cups
  - Winners (1): 1996

=== Rowing ===
- National Championships
  - Winners (11): 1949, 1950, 1951, 1978, 1979, 1980, 1982, 1986, 1999, 2010, 2018
- National Cups
  - Winners (6): 1996, 2000, 2018, 2019, 2023, 2024

=== Rugby league ===
- Serbian Rugby League Championship
  - Winners (8): 2014, 2017, 2018, 2019, 2020, 2021, 2022, 2023
- Serbian Rugby League Cup
  - Winners (5): 2016, 2018, 2019, 2020, 2023
- Serbian Super Cup
  - Winners (4): 2016, 2018, 2019, 2020
- Balkan Super League
  - Winners (5): 2018, 2019, 2021, 2022, 2023

==== Rugby league nines ====
===== Women =====
- Serbian Rugby League Championship
  - Winners (1): 2019

=== Rugby union ===
- Rugby Championship of Serbia
  - Winners (3): 2015, 2016, 2025
- Rugby Cup of Serbia
  - Winners (2): 2014, 2016

==== Rugby sevens ====
- Rugby Championship of Serbia
  - Winners (4): 2014, 2015, 2016, 2017

=== Shooting ===
==== Men ====
- National Championships
  - Winners (9): 1981, 1982 (2×), 1983 (2×), 1986, 1994, 1999, 2007
- National Cups
  - Winners (2): 1998, 2002

==== Women ====
- National Championships
  - Winners (39): 1992 (2×), 1993 (2×), 1994 (2×), 1995 (2×), 1996 (2×), 1997, 1998 (2×), 1999, 2001 (2×), 2002, 2004, 2005 (2×), 2006 (2×), 2007, 2008 (2×), 2009 (2×), 2010 (2×), 2011 (2×), 2012 (2×), 2013 (2×), 2014 (2×), 2015, 2016
- National Cups
  - Winners (3): 2013, 2015, 2016

=== Swimming ===
- National Championships
  - Winners (4): 1975, 1977, 1978, 1992
- National Cups
  - Winners (2): 1975, 1977

=== Table tennis ===
- National Championships
  - Winners (12): 1992–93, 2000–01, 2001–02, 2003–04, 2004–05, 2009–10, 2014–15, 2015–16, 2016–17, 2020–21, 2024–25, 2025-26
- National Cups
  - Winners (1): 2025-26

=== Taekwondo ===
==== Men ====
National Championships – 5

- Hyeong
  - Winners (4): 1998, 1999, 2000, 2001
- Sparring
  - Winners (1): 2001

==== Women ====
National Championships – 1

- Sparring
  - Winners (1): 2000

=== Tennis ===
==== Men ====
- National Championships
  - Winners (25): 1974, 1975, 1978, 1979, 1982, 1983, 1984, 1998, 1999, 2000, 2002, 2004, 2006, 2008, 2009, 2010, 2011, 2012, 2013, 2014, 2015, 2016, 2017, 2018, 2022

==== Women ====
- National Championships
  - Winners (16): 1998, 1999, 2001, 2002, 2003, 2004, 2005, 2006, 2007, 2008, 2011, 2014, 2015, 2018, 2025, 2026

=== Volleyball ===
==== Men ====
National Championships – 13

- Yugoslav Volleyball Championship
  - Winners (5): 1951, 1954, 1956, 1957, 1973–74
- Volleyball League of Serbia and Montenegro
  - Winners (1): 2002–03
- Volleyball League of Serbia
  - Winners (7): 2007–08, 2011–12, 2012–13, 2013–14, 2014–15, 2015–16, 2023–24

National Cups – 14

- Yugoslav Cup
  - Winners (5): 1959–60, 1972, 1973, 1975, 1991
- Serbia and Montenegro Cup
  - Winners (3): 1993, 1997, 1999
- Serbian Cup
  - Winners (6): 2008–09, 2010–11, 2012–13, 2013–14, 2015–16, 2018–19

National Super Cups – 6 (shared record)

- Serbian Super Cup
  - Winners (6): 2011, 2012, 2013, 2014, 2016, 2024

==== Women ====
National Championships – 28 (record)

- Yugoslav Volleyball Championship
  - Winners (18): 1959, 1962, 1963, 1964, 1965, 1966, 1967, 1968–69, 1969–70, 1970–71, 1971–72, 1974–75, 1975–76, 1976–77, 1977–78, 1978–79, 1981–82, 1982–83
- Volleyball League of Serbia and Montenegro
  - Winners (5): 1991–92, 1992–93, 2001–02, 2002–03, 2003–04
- Volleyball League of Serbia
  - Winners (5): 2009–10, 2010–11, 2011–12, 2012–13, 2021–22

National Cups – 18 (record)

- Yugoslav Cup
  - Winners (10): 1960, 1961, 1962, 1972, 1974, 1976–77, 1979, 1982, 1983, 1991
- Serbia and Montenegro Cup
  - Winners (2): 1992, 2002
- Serbian Cup
  - Winners (6): 2009–10, 2010–11, 2011–12, 2012–13, 2013–14, 2021–22

National Super Cups – 1

- Serbian Super Cup
  - Winners (1): 2022

=== Water polo ===
==== VK Crvena zvezda ====
National Championships – 4

- Serbia and Montenegro League
  - Winners (2): 1991–92, 1992–93
- Serbian League
  - Winners (2): 2012–13, 2013–14

National Cups – 4

- Serbian Cup
  - Winners (4): 2012–13, 2013–14, 2020–21, 2022–23

International titles – 2

- LEN Champions League
  - Winners (1): 2012–13
- LEN Super Cup
  - Winners (1): 2013

==== ŽVK Crvena zvezda ====
- Serbian League
  - Winners (5): 2013–14, 2014–15, 2015–16, 2016–17, 2017–18
- Serbian Cup
  - Winners (7): 2013, 2014, 2015, 2016, 2017, 2018, 2019

=== Weightlifting ===
- National Championships
  - Winners (4): 1997, 1998, 2001, 2007

=== Wrestling ===
==== Men ====
National Championships – 5

- Grappling
  - Winners (2): 2010, 2011
- Freestyle wrestling
  - Winners (2): 2012, 2024
- Beach wrestling
  - Winners (1): 2024

==== Women ====
- Euro Beach Wrestling League
  - Winners (1): 2026

National Championships – 15

- Grappling
  - Winners (1): 2011
- Freestyle wrestling
  - Winners (10): 2011, 2012, 2016, 2017, 2020, 2021, 2023, 2024, 2025, 2026
- Beach wrestling
  - Winners (4): 2022, 2024, 2025, 2026

National Cups – 4

- Freestyle wrestling
  - Winners (4): 2022, 2023, 2024, 2025
