= Dragan Vuković =

Serbian basketball coach

Crvena zvezda
- Position: Head coach
- League: Basketball League of Serbia; Adriatic League

Personal information
- Born: August 26, 1963 (age 63) Šabac, SR Serbia, SFR Yugoslavia
- Coaching career: 1991–present

Career history

Coaching
- 1996–1998: Iva Zorka Šabac
- 1998–2001: ŽKK Mačva Šabac
- 2001–2002: Iva Zorka Šabac
- 2002–2003: Crvena zvezda (assistant)
- Vojvodina
- Jedinstvo Bijelo Polje
- 2006–2009: Partizan
- 2009–2012: Radivoj Korać
- 2013–2024: Crvena zvezda

Dragan Vuković (Serbian Cyrillic: Драган Вуковић; born August 26, 1963) is a Serbian basketball coach. He currently serves as a head coach for the Crvena zvezda of the Women's Basketball League of Serbia and the Women's Adriatic League.

== Coaching career ==
=== Men's basketball ===
Vuković started his coaching career in hometown team Iva Zorka in 1991. In the first years he was a coach for youth selections. Later he became a head coach for senior team. After 1997–98 season he left. Also, he had second stint with Iva Zorka during 2001–02 season.

=== Women's basketball ===
Vuković was a heah coach for Mačva Šabac, Vojvodina, Jedinstvo Bijelo Polje, Partizan and Radivoj Korać.

==== Crvena zvezda (2013–present) ====
In 2013, Vuković became a head coach for Crvena zvezda. He won the national cup in the 2016 tournament. In the 2016–17 season, Vuković won Serbian League, the first time in 13 years. Also, he won the national cup with Zvezda in the same season.

In March 2021, Vuković coached the Zvezda on his 300th game.

== Career achievements ==
- Serbian League: 5 (with Crvena zvezda: 2016–17, 2017–18, 2018–19, 2020–21, 2021–22)
- Serbian Cup: 4 (with Crvena zvezda: 2015–16, 2016–17, 2018–19, 2021–22)
