= 2019–20 First Women's Basketball League of Serbia =

First Women's Basketball League of Serbia
- Season: 2019–20
- Duration: 5 October 2019 – 8 March 2020 (Regular season); March 2020 – April 2020 (Playoffs)
- Teams: 10
- All statistics correct as of 7 Мarch 2020.

The 2019–20 First Women's Basketball League of Serbia (Serbian Cyrillic: Прва женска лига Србије 2019–20.) is the 14th season of the First Women's Basketball League of Serbia, the highest professional basketball league in Serbia. Also, it's the 76th national championship played by Serbian clubs inclusive of the nation's previous incarnations as Yugoslavia and Serbia & Montenegro.

On 16 March 2020, the Basketball Federation of Serbia temporarily suspended its competitions due to the COVID-19 pandemic. On 2 June, the Federation canceled definitely the season due to the COVID-19 pandemic.

== Teams ==
=== Promotion and relegation ===
Teams promoted from the Second League

- Radnički Kragujevac
- Proleter Zrenjanin

Teams relegated to the Second League

- Spartak Subotica
- Bor
- Šabac
- Loznica

=== Venues and locations ===
Location of teams in the 2019–20 season

| Team | City | Arena | Capacity |
|---|---|---|---|
| 021 | Novi Sad | Petrovaradin Hall | 900 |
| Crvena zvezda Kombank | Belgrade | Basket City Hall | 1,600 |
| Kraljevo | Kraljevo | Kraljevo Sports Hall | 3,350 |
| Novosadska ŽKA | Novi Sad | SPC Vojvodina | 6,987 |
| Partizan 1953 | Belgrade | Vizura Sports Center | 1,500 |
| Proleter 023 | Zrenjanin | Crystal Hall | 2,800 |
| Radivoj Korać | Belgrade | Vizura Sports Center; Radivoj Korać Hall | 1,500 n/a |
| Radnički Kragujevac | Kragujevac | Gordana Goca Bogojević Hall | 800 |
| Student Niš | Niš | Dušan Radović School Hall | 1,000 |
| Vrbas Medela | Vrbas | CFK Drago Jovović | 2,500 |

| Team that play in the 2019–20 Adriatic League |

== Regular season ==
=== Standings ===
| Pos | Team | Pld | W | L | PF | PA | PD | Pts |
|---|---|---|---|---|---|---|---|---|
| 1 | Kraljevo | 18 | 17 | 1 | 1495 | 1226 | +269 | 35 |
| 2 | 021 | 18 | 14 | 4 | 1403 | 1209 | +194 | 32 |
| 3 | Crvena zvezda Kombank | 18 | 14 | 4 | 1379 | 1222 | +157 | 32 |
| 4 | Radivoj Korać | 18 | 12 | 6 | 1326 | 1184 | +142 | 30 |
| 5 | Radnički Kragujevac | 18 | 8 | 10 | 1345 | 1344 | +1 | 26 |
| 6 | Novosadska ŽKA | 18 | 6 | 12 | 1188 | 1289 | −101 | 24 |
| 7 | Partizan 1953 | 18 | 6 | 12 | 1214 | 1370 | −156 | 24 |
| 8 | Vrbas Medela | 18 | 6 | 12 | 1174 | 1202 | −28 | 24 |
| 9 | Student Niš | 18 | 5 | 13 | 1140 | 1368 | −228 | 23 |
| 10 | Proleter 023 | 18 | 2 | 16 | 1218 | 1468 | −250 | 20 |

Source: SrbijaSport

== See also ==
- 2019–20 Milan Ciga Vasojević Cup
- 2019–20 Basketball League of Serbia
- 2019–20 WABA League
