= 2022–23 First Women's Basketball League of Serbia =

First Women's League of Serbia
- Season: 2022–23
- Duration: 5 October 2022 – 22 April 2023
- Games played: 141
- Teams: 12

Regular season
- Relegated: Vršac; Radnički Kragujevac

Finals
- Champions: Crvena zvezda mts
- Runners-up: Kraljevo
- Semifinalists: Vojvodina 021; Art Basket
- All statistics correct as of 15 April 2023.

The 2022–23 First Women's Basketball League of Serbia (Serbian Cyrillic: Прва женска лига Србије 2022–23.) will be the 17th season of the First Women's Basketball League of Serbia, the highest professional basketball league in Serbia. Also, it will be the 79th national championship played by Serbian clubs inclusive of the nation's previous incarnations as Yugoslavia, Serbia and Montenegro.

Crvena zvezda mts is the defending champion.

== Teams ==
A total of 12 teams participated in the 2022–23 First Women's Basketball League of Serbia as confirmed by the Basketball Federation of Serbia on 1 July 2022.

=== Distribution ===
The following is the access list for this season.

Access list for the 2022–23 Serbian League
	Teams entering in this round	Teams advancing from the previous round
Regular season (12 teams)	10 highest-placed teams from the last season; 2 highest-placed teams from the Second League	
Playoffs (4 teams)		4 highest-placed teams from the Regular season

=== Promotion and relegation ===
Teams promoted from the Second League

- Sloga MAYA CONSULTING
- Novosadska ŽKA
- Spartak Subotica

Teams relegated to the Second League

- Student Niš
- Proleter 023
- Radivoj Korać

=== Venues and locations ===
Location of teams in the 2022–23 season

Club	City	Arena	Capacity
Art Basket	Belgrade	Mega Factory	500
Crvena zvezda mts	Belgrade	Basket City Hall	1,600
Duga	Šabac	Šabac Gymnasium Hall	—
Kraljevo	Kraljevo	Kraljevo Sports Hall	3,350
Novosadska ŽKA	Novi Sad	SPC Vojvodina	6,987
Partizan 1953	Belgrade	Ranko Žeravica Sports Hall	4,000
Radnički	Kragujevac	Jezero Hall	3,750
Sloga MAYA CONSULTING	Požega	Sports Hall Požega	—
Spartak Subotica	Subotica	Dudova Šuma Hall	2,500
Vojvodina 021	Novi Sad	Petrovaradin Hall	900
Vrbas Medela	Vrbas	CFK Drago Jovović	2,500
Vršac	Vršac	Millennium Center	4,400

Team that play in the 2022–23 Adriatic League
Team that play in the 2022–23 EuroCup Women

== Regular season ==
=== Standings ===
Pos	Team	Pld	W	L	PF	PA	PD	Pts	Qualification or relegation
1	Crvena zvezda mts	22	20	2	1977	1272	+705	42	Qualification to the Playoffs
2	Kraljevo	22	19	3	1690	1445	+245	41	Qualification to the Playoffs
3	Art Basket	22	17	5	1994	1423	+571	39	Qualification to the Playoffs
4	Vojvodina 021	22	13	9	1643	1380	+263	35	Qualification to the Playoffs
5	Sloga MAYA CONSULTING	22	13	9	1682	1520	+162	35	
6	Duga Šabac	22	12	10	1516	1574	−58	34	
7	Vrbas Medela	22	11	11	1567	1665	−98	33	
8	Partizan 1953	22	10	12	1692	1651	+41	32	
9	Novosadska ŽKA	22	6	16	1520	1720	−200	28	
10	Spartak Subotica	22	6	16	1568	1865	−297	28	
11	Vršac	22	4	18	1351	1820	−469	26	Relegation to the Second League
12	Radnički Kragujevac	22	1	21	1199	2064	−865	23	Relegation to the Second League

Updated to match(es) played on March 12, 2023. Source: SrbijaSport / KSS

== Playoffs ==
The four highest-placed teams from the Regular season will qualify for the Playoffs.

=== Bracket ===
Semifinals
29 March – 2 April
Crvena zvezda mts	2
Vojvodina 021	0
28 March – 1 April
Kraljevo	2
Art Basket	0

Finals
8 – 22 April
Crvena zvezda mts	3
Kraljevo	2

=== Semifinals ===
Team 1	Series	Team 2	Game 1	Game 2	Game 3
Crvena zvezda mts	2–0	Vojvodina 021	90–53	71–49	—
Kraljevo	2–0	Art Basket	77–68	85–83	—

=== Finals ===
Team 1	Series	Team 2	Game 1	Game 2	Game 3	Game 4	Game 5
Crvena zvezda mts	3–2	Kraljevo	73–66	74–63	79–85	69—75	67—61

== See also ==
- 2022–23 Milan Ciga Vasojević Cup
- 2022–23 Basketball League of Serbia
- 2022–23 WABA League
