= 2016–17 First Women's Basketball League of Serbia =

- League: First League of Serbia
- Sport: Basketball
- Duration: 8 October 2016 – 12 April 2017
- Games: 140
- Teams: 12
- Total attendance: 2489 (in play off)

2016–17
- Season champions: Crvena zvezda (29th title)
- Season MVP: (Serbia) Teodora Turudić

First League of Serbia seasons
- ← 2015–16 2017–18 →

The 2016–17 First Women's Basketball League of Serbia is the 11th season of the First Women's Basketball League of Serbia, the highest professional basketball league in Serbia. It is also 73rd national championship played by Serbian clubs inclusive of nation's previous incarnations as Yugoslavia and Serbia and Montenegro.

The first half of the season consists of 12 teams and 132-game regular season (22 games for each of the 12 teams).

21 December 2016, Vojvodina NS is expelled from the league on the basis of the regulations of the Federation because it is not organized two matches in a row as the host, and according to the same rules will be transferred to the two lower competition.

== Team information ==
Team	City	Arena	Capacity
Crvena zvezda	Belgrade	Basket city Hall	1.600
Kraljevo	Kraljevo	Kraljevo Sports Hall	3.350
Novosadska ŽKA	Novi Sad	SPC Vojvodina - big hall SPC Vojvodina - small hall	11.500; 1.030
Partizan 1953	Belgrade	Sports Hall Ranko Žeravica; Hall Vizura Sport	5.000; 1.500
Radivoj Korać	Belgrade	SC Šumice; Sport EKO Hall	2.000; 1.000
Spartak Subotica	Subotica	Sport Palace Subotica	3.500
Student Niš	Niš	Dušan Radović School Hall	1.000
Vojvodina NS	Novi Sad	SPC Vojvodina - small hall	1.030
Vrbas Medela	Vrbas	CFK Vrbas	2.500
Vršac	Vršac	Millennium Center	5.000
Šabac	Šabac	Šabac High School Hall	500
Šumadija Kragujevac	Kragujevac	Hall Gordana Goca Bogojević	600

Teams from Adriatic League

== Regular season ==
The League of the season was played with 12 teams and play a dual circuit system, each with each one game at home and away. The four best teams at the end of the regular season were placed in the Play Off. The regular season began on 8 October 2016 and it will end on 8 March 2017.

=== Standings ===
Pos	Team	Pld	W	L	PF	PA	PD	Pts	Qualification or relegation
1	Radivoj Korać	22	19	3	1489	1195	+294	41	Play Off
2	Crvena zvezda	22	18	4	1551	1134	+417	40	Play Off
3	Partizan 1953	22	17	5	1460	1273	+187	39	Play Off
4	Vršac	22	14	8	1392	1294	+98	36	Play Off
5	Kraljevo	22	14	8	1273	1118	+155	36	
6	Vrbas Medela	22	12	10	1404	1342	+62	34	
7	Šabac	22	10	12	1458	1498	−40	32	
8	Spartak Subotica	22	9	13	1187	1343	−156	31	
9	Student Niš	22	7	15	1266	1354	−88	29	
10	Šumadija Kragujevac	22	7	15	1247	1489	−242	29	
11	Novosadska ŽKA	22	5	17	1168	1415	−247	27	Relegation to Second League
12	Vojvodina NS	22	0	22	0	440	−440	0 (Note: 22 points deducted)	Relegation to Second League

=== Results ===
Home \ Away	CZV	KRA	NŽKA	PAR	RAK	SPA	STU	VOJ	VRB	VRŠ	ŠAB	ŠKG
Crvena zvezda		61–64	97–49	74–53	74–75	77–47	62–45	20–0	71–65	79–69	104–71	73–53
Kraljevo	54–48		58–56	51–56	53–64	77–32	75–55	20–0	60–54	68–72	70–56	67–50
Novosadska ŽKA	57–78	52–74		55–67	48–73	42–81	42–63	20–0	71–51	56–66	70–59	65–71
Partizan 1953	53–82	59–52	75–55		77–67	75–48	85–52	20–0	74–65	66–54	83–57	93–58
Radivoj Korać	63–65	83–72	71–45	66–55		60–48	83–53	20–0	77–63	61–59	86–68	84–48
Spartak Subotica	48–80	34–53	63–65	61–60	48–74		62–56	20–0	64–76	59–52	77–73	66–59
Student Niš	50–73	50–54	61–50	63–76	76–79	74–54		20–0	83–65	56–65	61–77	79–51
Vojvodina NS	0–20	0–20	0–20	0–20	0–20	0–20	0–20		0–20	0–20	0–20	0–20
Vrbas Medela	55–80	66–51	85–57	75–79	61–71	74–60	76–57	20–0		78–57	72–68	74–56
Vršac	69–67	66–54	59–47	76–80	71–66	72–46	70–56	20–0	81–64		65–75	84–64
Šabac	51–99	62–56	88–76	77–65	64–77	70–77	88–79	20–0	65–68	89–72		87–65
Šumadija Kragujevac	43–67	42–70	75–70	85–89	47–69	74–72	67–57	20–0	60–77	63–73	76–73	

Legend: Blue = home team win; Yellow = draw; Red = away team win.

== Play Off ==
=== Semifinals ===
Game 1

22 March 2017
18:00

Report

Radivoj Korać	71–43	Vršac
Scoring by quarter: 15:16, 22:16, 20:8, 14:3
Pts: Turudić 17; Rebs: Erak 8 Asts: four players 2		Pts: Bošnjić 11; Rebs: Janković 7 Asts: Mršić 6
1:0

SC Šumice, Belgrade
Attendance: 100
Referees: Ivanović, Virijević, Živković

23 March 2017
19:00

Report

Crvena zvezda	75–49	Partizan 1953
Scoring by quarter: 24:17, 16:7, 17:11, 18:14
Pts: A. Katanić 18; Rebs: Stjepanović 11; Asts: I. Katanić, A. Katanić 2		Pts: Orozović 12; Rebs: Mitić 7 Asts: Orozović 4
1:0

Basket city Hall, Belgrade
Attendance: 400
Referees: Savić, Arsić, Đorđević

Game 2

25 March 2017
20:30

Report

Vršac	47–70	Radivoj Korać
Scoring by quarter: 17:17, 12:17, 5:20, 13:16
Pts: Mršić 11; Rebs: Mitov, Bošnjić 5 Asts: Mršić 4		Pts: Spasojević 14; Rebs: Turudić, Stevanović 6 Asts: Nikolić 4
0:2

Millennium Center, Vršac
Attendance: 250
Referees: Smiljanić, Vlahović, Svrkota

26 March 2017
19:00

Report

Partizan 1953	63–71 (OT)	Crvena zvezda
Scoring by quarter: 14:14, 17:18, 14:18, 14:9, Overtime: 4:12
Pts: Milovanović 15; Rebs: Orozović 7 Asts: Živadinović 7		Pts: Prlja 19; Rebs: Đorđević 10; Asts: three players 3
0:2

Sports Hall Ranko Žeravica, Belgrade
Attendance: 239
Referees: Juras, Pavlica, Heđeši

=== Final ===
Game 1

1 April 2017
18:00

Report

Radivoj Korać	59–47	Crvena zvezda
Scoring by quarter: 15:13, 10:13, 18:2, 16:19
Pts: Turudić 19; Rebs: Stojiljković 8 Asts: Nikolić 8		Pts: Prlja 12; Rebs: Đorđević 8 Asts: A. Katanić, Mišeljić 3
1:0

SC Šumice, Belgrade
Attendance: 400
Referees: Juras, Virijević, Grujić

Game 2

5 April 2017
19:00

Report

Crvena zvezda	64–52	Radivoj Korać
Scoring by quarter: 18:12, 20:12, 15:12, 11:16
Pts: Jovanović 18; Rebs: A. Katanić 6 Asts: Prlja 5		Pts: Spasojević 16; Rebs: Erak 7 Asts: Nikolić, Spasojević 2
1:1

Basket city Hall, Belgrade
Attendance: 400
Referees: Pavlica, Savić, Grujić

Game 3

8 April 2017
17:30

Report

Radivoj Korać	42–71	Crvena zvezda
Scoring by quarter: 12:20, 15:13, 9:21, 6:17
Pts: Turudić 11; Rebs: Turudić, Stojiljković 5 Asts: Spasojević, L. Vučković 2		Pts: Đorđević 17; Rebs: Đorđević 8 Asts: A. Katanić 7
1:2

SC Šumice, Belgrade
Attendance: 400
Referees: Juras, Smiljanić, Arsić

Game 4

12 April 2017
19:00

Report

Crvena zvezda	68–33	Radivoj Korać
Scoring by quarter: 13:9, 23:15, 11:8, 21:1
Pts: Mišeljić 15; Rebs: A. Katanić 9 Asts: A. Katanić 8		Pts: L. Vučković 9 Rebs: Turudić 8 Asts: Nikolić
3:1

Basket city Hall, Belgrade
Attendance: 300
Referees: Juras, Savić, Pavlica

=== Bracket ===
Semifinals
1	Radivoj Korać	2
4	Vršac	0
2	Crvena zvezda	2
3	Partizan 1953	0

Final
1	Radivoj Korać	1
2	Crvena zvezda	3

== Awards ==
- Finals MVP: Mina Đorđević (186-PF-99) of Crvena zvezda
- Player of the Year: Bojana Stevanović (180-F/C-96) of Radivoj Korać
- Guard of the Year: Aleksandra Katanić (172-PG-97) of Crvena zvezda
- Forward of the Year: Mina Đorđević (186-PF-99) of Crvena zvezda
- Center of the Year: Bojana Stevanović (180-F/C-96) of Radivoj Korać
- Defensive player of the year: Bojana Stevanović (180-F/C-96) of Radivoj Korać
- Most Improved Player of the Year: Teodora Turudić (178-F-99) of Radivoj Korać
- Coach of the Year: Dragan Vuković of Crvena zvezda

1st Team

- PG: Aleksandra Katanić (172-PG-97) of Crvena zvezda
- PF: Mina Đorđević (186-PF-99) of Crvena zvezda
- PF: Suzana Milovanović (185-PF-79) of Partizan 1953
- PF: Zorica Mitov (188-PF-87) of Vršac
- F/C: Bojana Stevanović (180-F/C-96) of Radivoj Korać

2nd Team

- SG: Snežana Bogićević (177-SG-97) of Crvena zvezda
- F: Teodora Turudić (178-F-99) (178-F-99) of Radivoj Korać
- F: Marina Mandić (182-F-83) of Vršac
- F/C: Nataša Mijatović (191-F/C-89) of Vrbas Medela
- C/F: Ivanka Matić (193-C/F-79) of Tarbes Basket

3rd Team

- G: Rada Vidović (177-G-79) of Partizan 1953
- G: Jelena Trifunović (G-92) of Šumadija Kragujevac
- F: Kristina Milošević (177-F-90) of Šumadija Kragujevac
- F: Anđelina Radić (187-F-94) of Kraljevo
- F/C: Tamara Jokić (182-F/C-96) of Šabac

Honorable Mention

- Tijana Jelić (189-F/C-99) of Radivoj Korać
- Anja Spasojević (180-SG-96) of Radivoj Korać
- Ivana Katanić (174-PG-99) of Crvena zvezda
- Milina Mišeljić (186-PF-98) of Crvena zvezda
- Marija Prlja (163-PG-87) of Crvena zvezda
- Ivana Šerić (170-G-88) of Kraljevo
- Miljana Džombeta (169-PG-94) of Vrbas Medela
- Jelena Nikpaljević (175-G-94) of Vrbas Medela
- Olga Stepanović (178-SG-94) of Partizan 1953
- Nataša Pavlov (179-F/C-93) of Spartak Subotica
- Sofija Lazareska (175-G/F-95) of Šumadija Kragujevac
- Jovana Jeremić (95) of Student Niš
- Dragana Nikolić (189-PF-95) of Student Niš
- Anastasija Podunavac (184-C-97) of Novosadska ŽKA
- Marijana Čorto (182-F-94) of Vojvodina NS
