= 2018–19 Women's Basketball League of Serbia =

Women's Basketball League of Serbia
- Season: 2018–19
- Duration: September 29, 2018 – March 2, 2019 (Regular season); March 30, 2019 – April 2019 (Playoffs)
- Games played: 132
- Teams: 12

Regular season
- Top seed: Crvena zvezda
- Relegated: Student; Spartak

Finals
- Champions: Crvena zvezda (31st title)
- Runners-up: 021
- Semifinalists: Radivoj Korać; Novosadska ŽKA

Statistical leaders
Points	(Serbia) Jovana Adamović	24.2
Rebounds	(Serbia) Jelena Mitrović	14.7
Assists	(Serbia) Anđela Radović	8.4

Records
- Winning streak: Crvena zvezda (21 games)
- Losing streak: Spartak (21 games)
- All statistics correct as of 18 April 2019.

The 2018–19 Women's Basketball League of Serbia (Serbian Cyrillic: Женска кошаркашка лига Србије 2018–19.) is the 13th season of the Women's Basketball League of Serbia, the highest professional basketball league in Serbia. Also, it's the 75th national championship played by Serbian clubs inclusive of nation's previous incarnations as Yugoslavia and Serbia & Montenegro.

The first half of the season consists of 12 teams and 132-game regular season (22 games for each of the 12 teams).

== Teams ==
=== Promotion and relegation ===
Teams promoted from the Second League

- Loznica
- Novosadska ŽKA

Teams relegated to the Second League

- Šumadija
- Vršac

=== Venues and locations ===
Location of teams in the 2018–19 season

Team	City	Arena	Capacity
021	Novi Sad	Petrovaradin Hall	900
Bor	Bor	Bor Sports Center	3,000
Crvena zvezda	Belgrade	Železnik Hall	3,000
Kraljevo	Kraljevo	Kraljevo Sports Hall	3,350
Loznica	Loznica	Lagator Hall	2,236
Novosadska ŽKA	Novi Sad	SPC Vojvodina	6,987
Partizan 1953	Belgrade	Vizura Sports Center	1,500
Radivoj Korać	Belgrade	Vizura Sports Center	1,500
Spartak	Subotica	Dudova Šuma Sports Center	2,500
Student Niš	Niš	Dušan Radović School Hall	1,000
Vrbas Medela	Vrbas	CFK Drago Jovović	2,500
Šabac	Šabac	Šabac High School Hall	500

Team that play in the 2018–19 Adriatic League

== Regular season ==
=== Standings ===
Pos	Team	Pld	W	L	PF	PA	PD	Pts	Qualification or relegation
1	Crvena zvezda	22	21	1	1876	1339	+537	43	Qualification to the Playoffs
2	Radivoj Korać	22	18	4	1720	1530	+190	40	Qualification to the Playoffs
3	021	22	17	5	1657	1459	+198	39	Qualification to the Playoffs
4	Novosadska ŽKA	22	15	7	1685	1568	+117	37	Qualification to the Playoffs
5	Partizan 1953	22	13	9	1764	1525	+239	35	
6	Loznica	22	11	11	1516	1602	−86	33	
7	Vrbas Medela	22	9	13	1657	1680	−23	31	
8	Kraljevo	22	9	13	1473	1544	−71	31	
9	Bor	22	7	15	1441	1520	−79	29	Relegation to the Second League
10	Šabac	22	6	16	1465	1668	−203	28	Relegation to the Second League
11	Student Niš	22	5	17	1390	1548	−158	27	Relegation to the Second League
12	Spartak	22	1	21	1272	1933	−661	23	Relegation to the Second League

Source: SrbijaSport

== Playoffs ==
=== Bracket ===
Semifinals
30 March – 4 April
Crvena zvezda	2
Novosadska ŽKA	0
30 March – 4 April
Radivoj Korać	0
021	2

Finals
April
Crvena zvezda	3
021	0

=== Semifinals ===
Team 1	Series	Team 2	Game 1	Game 2	Game 3
Crvena zvezda	2–0	Novosadska ŽKA	78–67	81–80	—
Radivoj Korać	0–2	021	84–88	64–72	—

=== Finals ===
Crvena zvezda won 3–0 over 021 in the Finals.

Team 1	Series	Team 2	Game 1	Game 2	Game 3	Game 4	Game 5
Crvena zvezda	3–0	021	62–50	68–60	69–49		

== See also ==
- 2018–19 Milan Ciga Vasojević Cup
- 2018–19 Basketball League of Serbia
- 2018–19 WABA League
