= Maša Janković =

Serbian basketball player

No. 12 – Cb Avenida Perfumerias
- Position: Small forward
- League: Liga Femenina de Baloncesto

Personal information
- Born: 1 February 2000 (age 26) Vrbas, Serbia, FR Yugoslavia
- Listed height: 6 ft 2 in (1.88 m)

Career information
- Playing career: 2014–present

Career history
- 2014–2018: Vrbas
- 2018–2019: Novosadska ŽKA
- 2019–2022: Crvena zvezda
- 2022: Vrbas

Career highlights
- WABA Newcomer of the Year (2020); WABA All-Newcomers Team (2020)
Medals
Women's basketball
Representing Serbia
EuroBasket
Gold medal – first place	2021 France/Spain

Maša Janković (Serbian Cyrillic: Маша Јанковић; born 1 February 2000) is a Serbian basketball player for CB Perfumerias Avenida of the Liga Femenina de Baloncesto. Also, she represents Serbia national team internationally.

== Playing career ==
In June 2019, Janković signed a three-year contract with Crvena zvezda.

== National team career ==
In June 2021, Janković was a member of the Serbia national team that won the gold medal at the Eurobasket 2021 in Valencia, Spain.

== Career achievements ==
- Serbian League: 2 (with Crvena zvezda: 2020–21, 2021–22)
- Serbian Cup: 1 (with Crvena zvezda: 2021–22)
