= List of basketball clubs in Serbia by major honours won =

The following are lists of the major honours won by basketball clubs in Serbia. It lists every Serbian professional basketball club, both men's and women's, to have won one of the two major Serbian national domestic trophies, the Adriatic trophies, and any of the major official European continental-wide competitions.

== Key ==
Most in category
Defunct

== Men's clubs ==
Note: Statistics are correct through the end of the 2024–25 season.

	Club	City	National League (Note: The clubs have played in three National Leagues since 1945, including the Yugoslav First Federal League (1945–1992), the First League of Serbia and Montenegro (1992–2006) and the Serbian League (2006 onward).)	National Cup (Note: The clubs have played in two National Cup tournaments, including the Yugoslav Cup (1959–2002) and the Radivoj Korać Cup (2003 onward).)	Yugoslav Super Cup	Adriatic League	Adriatic SuperCup	EuroLeague (1st–tier)	FIBA Saporta Cup (2nd–tier)	FIBA Korać Cup (3rd–tier)	Total	Ref
1	Partizan	Belgrade	22	16	0	8	1	1	0	3	51	
2	Crvena zvezda	Belgrade	24	15	1	7	1	0	1	0	49	
3	OKK Beograd	Belgrade	4	3	0	0	0	0	0	0	7	
4	FMP Železnik	Belgrade	0	4	0	2	0	0	0	0	6	
5	Radnički Beograd	Belgrade	1	1	0	0	0	0	0	0	2	
6	Proleter	Zrenjanin	1	0	0	0	0	0	0	0	1	
6	Spartak	Subotica	1	0	0	0	0	0	0	0	1	
6	IMT / Beopetrol / Atlas	Belgrade	0	1	0	0	0	0	0	0	1	
6	Mega Basket	Belgrade	0	1	0	0	0	0	0	0	1	
6	Vršac	Vršac	0	0	0	1	0	0	0	0	1	

== Women's clubs ==
Note: Statistics are correct through the end of the 2024–25 season.

	Club	City	National League (Note: The clubs have played in three different National Leagues since 1946, including the Yugoslav First Federal League (1946–1992), the First League of Serbia and Montenegro (1992–2006) and the Serbian League (2006 onward).)	National Cup (Note: The clubs have played in three different National Cup tournaments, including the Yugoslav Cup (1960, 1962, 1972–2002), the Serbia and Montenegro Cup (1993–2006) and the Serbian Cup (2007 onward).)	Adriatic League	EuroLeague	Total	Ref
1	Crvena zvezda	Belgrade	36	17	0	1	54	
2	Vršac	Vršac	9	11	0	0	20	
3	Partizan 1953	Belgrade	7	5	2	0	14	
4	Radnički Beograd	Belgrade	6	2	0	0	8	
5	Radivoj Korać	Belgrade	3	1	1	0	5	
6	Vojvodina	Novi Sad	2	2	0	0	4	
6	Voždovac	Belgrade	2	2	0	0	4	
8	Art Basket	Belgrade	1	2	0	0	3	
9	Bečej	Bečej	2	0	0	0	2	
9	Dinamo	Pančevo	1	1	0	0	2	
10	Student	Niš	0	1	0	0	1	
10	Kovin	Kovin	0	1	0	0	1	
10	Kraljevo	Kraljevo	0	1	0	0	1	

== Combined honors ==
Note: Statistics are correct through the end of the 2024–25 season.

The following is a list of combined trophies of both men and women teams who has a parent club, including only those who won titles in both genders.

	Multi-sport club	City	League	Cup	Adriatic (Note: Includes all Adriatic-level competitions.)	Europe (Note: Includes all European-level competitions.)	Total	Ref
1	SD Crvena Zvezda	Belgrade	60	33	8	2	103	
2	JSD Partizan	Belgrade	29	21	11	4	65	
3	KK Vršac d.o.o. (Note: A private limited company which controls only two basketball selections, no other sports included.)	Vršac	9	11	1	0	21	
4	SD Radnički Beograd	Belgrade	7	3	0	0	10	
5	Mega Basket / Art Basket (Note: Mega Basket (men) and Art Basket (women) are not a part any multi-sport club but they have been in a cooperation since 2017.)	Belgrade	1	3	0	0	4	

== See also ==
- List of European Major Basketball club competition winners
- List of FIBA Europe women's club competition winners
- List of basketball clubs in Greece by major honours won
