= 2019–20 Milan Ciga Vasojević Cup =

2020 Milan Ciga Vasojević Cup
- Season: 2019–20
- Duration: 14–15 March 2020
- Games played: 3
- Teams: 4
- TV partner: Arena Sport

Finals
- Champions: Kraljevo (1st title)
- Runners-up: Radivoj Korać

The 2020 Milan Ciga Vasojević Cup is the 14th season of the Serbian women's national basketball cup tournament.,

The tournament was held in Surdulica from 14 to 15 March 2020.

== Qualified teams ==
Cup of Serbia (2nd-tier)
Radivoj Korać
Novosadska ŽKA
Kraljevo
Vrbas Medela

== Venue ==
| Surdulica | 2019–20 Milan Ciga Vasojević Cup (Serbia) |
| Surdulica Sports Hall | 2019–20 Milan Ciga Vasojević Cup (Serbia) |
| Capacity: 800 | 2019–20 Milan Ciga Vasojević Cup (Serbia) |

== Bracket ==
Semifinals
14 March
Radivoj Korać | 78
Vrbas Medela | 74
14 March
Kraljevo | 75
Novosadska ŽKA | 69

Final
15 March
Radivoj Korać | 73
Kraljevo | 76

== Semifinals ==
=== Radivoj Korać vs Vrbas Medela ===
14 March 2020
17:00

Report

| Radivoj Korać | 78–74 | Vrbas Medela |
Scoring by quarter: 30:19, 19:28, 19:13, 10:14
| Pts: Tomašević 26; Rebs: Maksimović 16; Asts: Tomašević 5 | | Pts: Pronić 25; Rebs: Janković 12; Asts: Gvero 7 |

Surdulica Sports Hall, Surdulica
Attendance: 30
Referees: Juras, Ivanović, Jovčić

=== Kraljevo vs Novosadska ŽKA ===
14 March 2020
19:30

Report

| Kraljevo | 75–69 | Novosadska ŽKA |
Scoring by quarter: 13:11, 21:18, 25:10, 16:30
| Pts: Pierre-Louis 15; Rebs: Živanović 9 Asts: Hill 10 | | Pts: Mršić 22; Rebs: Roglić, Mirosavljev 7 Asts: Radulović 4 |

Surdulica Sports Hall, Surdulica
Attendance: 40
Referees: Smiljanić, Ljubić, Nikolić

== Final ==
15 March 2020
18:00

Report

| Radivoj Korać | 73–76 | Kraljevo |
Scoring by quarter: 21:15, 11:17, 19:13, 22:31
| Pts: Tomašević 23; Rebs: Tomašević 7 Asts: Vukosavljević 10 | | Pts: Pierre-Louis 16; Rebs: Gobeljić 7 Asts: Hill 6 |

Surdulica Sports Hall, Surdulica
Attendance: 40
Referees: Juras, Smiljanić, Ivanović

== See also ==
- 2019–20 First Women's Basketball League of Serbia
- 2019–20 Radivoj Korać Cup
