= 2021–22 First Women's Basketball League of Serbia =

First Women's League of Serbia
- Season: 2021–22
- Duration: 2 October 2021 – 21 April 2022
- Teams: 12

Finals
- Champions: Crvena zvezda mts
- Runners-up: Art Basket
- Semifinalists: Vojvodina 021; Kraljevo
- All statistics correct as of 25 January 2023.

The 2021–22 First Women's Basketball League of Serbia (Serbian Cyrillic: Прва женска лига Србије 2021–22.) will be the 16th season of the First Women's Basketball League of Serbia, the highest professional basketball league in Serbia. Also, it will be the 78th national championship played by Serbian clubs inclusive of the nation's previous incarnations as Yugoslavia, Serbia and Montenegro.

Crvena zvezda mts is the defending champion.

== Teams ==
A total of 12 teams participated in the 2021–22 First Women's Basketball League of Serbia as confirmed by the Basketball Federation of Serbia on 30 June 2021.

=== Distribution ===
The following is the access list for this season.

Access list for the 2021–22 Serbian League
	Teams entering in this round	Teams advancing from the previous round
Regular season (12 teams)	10 highest-placed teams from the last season; 2 highest-placed teams from the Second League	
Playoffs (4 teams)		4 highest-placed teams from the Regular season

=== Promotion and relegation ===
Teams promoted from the Second League

- Proleter 023
- Vršac

Teams relegated to the Second League

- Novosadska ŽKA
- Spartak

=== Venues and locations ===
Location of teams in the 2021–22 season

Club	City	Arena	Capacity
Art Basket	Belgrade	Mega Factory	500
Crvena zvezda mts	Belgrade	Basket City Hall	1,600
Duga	Šabac	Šabac Gymnasium Hall	—
Kraljevo	Kraljevo	Kraljevo Sports Hall	3,350
Partizan 1953	Belgrade	Ranko Žeravica Sports Hall	4,000
Proleter 023	Zrenjanin	Crystal Hall	3,000
Radivoj Korać	Belgrade	Radivoj Korać Hall	700
Radnički	Kragujevac	Jezero Hall	3,750
Student	Niš	Dušan Radović School Hall	1,000
Vojvodina 021	Novi Sad	Petrovaradin Hall	900
Vrbas Medela	Vrbas	CFK Drago Jovović	2,500
Vršac	Vršac	Millennium Center	4,400

Team that play in the 2021–22 Adriatic League
Team that play in the 2021–22 EuroCup Women

== Regular season ==
=== Standings ===
Pos	Team	Pld	W	L	PF	PA	PD	Pts	Qualification or relegation
1	Crvena zvezda mts	22	21	1	2051	1359	+692	43	Qualification to the Playoffs
2	Art Basket	22	19	3	2058	1478	+580	41	Qualification to the Playoffs
3	Kraljevo	22	17	5	1738	1525	+213	39	Qualification to the Playoffs
4	Vojvodina 021	22	17	5	1663	1360	+303	39	Qualification to the Playoffs
5	Duga Šabac	22	13	9	1601	1598	+3	35	
6	Partizan 1953	22	12	10	1586	1575	+11	34	
7	Vrbas Medela	22	9	13	1500	1691	−191	31	
8	Radivoj Korać	22	8	14	1519	1755	−236	30	
9	Vršac	22	7	15	1643	1690	−47	29	
10	Radnički Kragujevac	22	6	16	1467	1727	−260	28	
11	Student Niš	22	2	20	1416	2006	−590	24	Relegation to the Second League
12	Proleter 023	22	1	21	1355	1833	−478	23	Relegation to the Second League

Updated to match(es) played on March 27, 2022. Source: SrbijaSport / KSS

== Playoffs ==
The four highest-placed teams from the Regular season will qualify for the Playoffs.

=== Bracket ===
Semifinals
2–6 April
Crvena zvezda mts	2
Vojvodina 021	0
2–6 April
Art Basket	2
Kraljevo	0

Finals
13–20 April
Crvena zvezda mts	3
Art Basket	0

=== Semifinals ===
Team 1	Series	Team 2	Game 1	Game 2	Game 3
Crvena zvezda mts	2–0	Vojvodina 021	67–59	79–74	—
Art Basket	2–0	Kraljevo	81–60	88–56	—

=== Finals ===
Team 1	Series	Team 2	Game 1	Game 2	Game 3
Crvena zvezda mts	3–0	Art Basket	81–68	77–73	71–61

== See also ==
- 2021–22 Milan Ciga Vasojević Cup
- 2021–22 Basketball League of Serbia
- 2021–22 WABA League
