= Dejan Kovačević =

Dejan Kovačević may refer to:

- Dejan Kovačević (basketball) (born 1996), Bosnian-German basketball player
- Dejan Kovačević (Socialist Party of Serbia politician) (1937–2021), Serbian politician
- Dejan Kovačević (Serbian Progressive Party politician) (born 1979), Serbian politician
