= 2021–22 Milan Ciga Vasojević Cup =

2022 Milan Ciga Vasojević Cup
Tournament details
- Country: Serbia
- City: Niš
- Venue(s): Čair Sports Center
- Dates: 11–12 March 2022
- Teams: 4
- Defending champions: Art Basket
- TV partner(s): Arena Sport

Final positions
- Champions: Crvena zvezda mts
- Runner-up: Art Basket
- Semifinalists: Kraljevo; Vojvodina 021

Tournament statistics
- Matches played: 3
- All statistics correct as of 22 March 2022 (UTC).

The 2022 Milan Ciga Vasojević Cup is the 16th season of the Serbian women's national basketball cup tournament, scheduled to be held from 11 to 12 March 2022 in Niš, Serbia.

== Qualification ==
Qualified teams

- Section 1: Crvena zvezda mts
- Section 2: Kraljevo
- Section 3: Art Basket
- Section 4: Vojvodina 021

=== Section 1 ===
Qualifying competition
12 January 2022
Topolčanka | 59
Novosadska ŽKA | 70
11 January 2022
Rudar 1903 | 20
Karaburma | 0

Eighth-finals
22 February 2022
Novosadska ŽKA | 84
Radivoj Korać | 82
24 February 2022
Rudar 1903 | 37
Crvena zvezda mts | 87

Quarterfinals
3 March 2022
Novosadska ŽKA | 45
Crvena zvezda mts | 97

=== Section 2 ===
Eighth-finals
25 February 2022
Vrbas Medela | 57
Radnički Kragujevac | 59
22 February 2022
Proleter 023 | 67
Kraljevo | 80

Quarterfinals
2 March 2022
Radnički Kragujevac | 82
Kraljevo | 91

=== Section 3 ===
Qualifying competition
11 January 2022
Ljubovija | 51
Sloga | 61

Eighth-finals
23 February 2022
Vršac | 67
Partizan 1953 | 70
23 February 2022
Sloga | 51
Art Basket | 87

Quarterfinals
2 March 2022
Partizan 1953 | 67
Art Basket | 74

=== Section 4 ===
Qualifying competition
12 January 2022
Srbobran | 64
Spartak | 72

Eighth-finals
24 February 2022
Duga | 67
Student | 60
13 February 2022
Spartak | 56
Vojvodina 021 | 95

Quarterfinals
2 March 2022
Duga | 75
Vojvodina 021 | 76

== Venue ==
| Niš | 2021–22 Milan Ciga Vasojević Cup (Serbia) |
| Čair Sports Center | 2021–22 Milan Ciga Vasojević Cup (Serbia) |
| Capacity: 4,800 | 2021–22 Milan Ciga Vasojević Cup (Serbia) |

== Draw ==
The draw was conducted in the Tami hotel in Niš on Monday 7 March 2022.

== Bracket ==
Semifinals
11 March
Kraljevo | 69
Crvena zvezda mts | 80
11 March
Art Basket | 79
Vojvodina 021 | 77

Final
12 March
Crvena zvezda mts | 90
Art Basket | 71

== Semifinals ==
=== Kraljevo v Crvena zvezda mts ===
11 March 2022
16:00

Boxscore

| Kraljevo | 69–80 | Crvena zvezda mts |
Scoring by quarter: 23–21, 16–17, 15–19, 15–23
| Pts: Radović 17; Rebs: Gobeljić 7 Asts: three players 5 | | Pts: M. Janković 21; Rebs: Elliott 11; Asts: Naumčev, M. Janković 4 |

Čair Sports Center, Niš
Attendance: 50
Referees: Juras, Smiljanić, Nedeljković

=== Art Basket v Vojvodina 021 ===
11 March 2022
18:30

Boxscore

| Art Basket | 79–77 | Vojvodina 021 |
Scoring by quarter: 21–21, 20–19, 18–20, 20–17
| Pts: Stefanović 20; Rebs: Vučković 6 Asts: Bukvić 6 | | Pts: Ž. Janković, Loomis 16; Rebs: Prokić, Ž. Janković 8 Asts: Prokić, Vujisić 7 |

Čair Sports Center, Niš
Attendance: 50
Referees: Ivanović, Jovičin, Dimovski

== Final ==
12 March 2022
18:30

Boxscore

| Crvena zvezda mts | 90–71 | Art Basket |
Scoring by quarter: 23–18, 25–20, 19–23, 23–10
| Pts: Elliott 22; Rebs: Elliott 12; Asts: Katanić 7 | | Pts: Mitrović 25; Rebs: Mitrović 10; Asts: Čolić 10 |

Čair Sports Center, Niš
Attendance: 50
Referees: Juras, Smiljanić, Ivanović

== See also ==
- 2021–22 First Women's Basketball League of Serbia
- 2021–22 Radivoj Korać Cup
