= 2020–21 WABA League =

WABA League
- Season: 2020–21
- Duration: October 14, 2020 – March 4, 2021 (Regular season); 20–21 March 2021 (Final Four)
- Games played: 60
- Teams: 8
- TV partner: TV Stara Zagora

Regular season
- Season MVP: Mina Đorđević

Finals
- Champions: (Bulgaria) Beroe
- Runners-up: (Montenegro) Budućnost Bemax
- Semifinalists: (Bulgaria) Montana 2003 (Slovenia) Cinkarna Celje

Records
- Highest attendance: 50; Cinkarna Celje 49–68 Budućnost Bemax (16 January 2021); Budućnost Bemax 79–44 Montana 2003 (26 February 2021); Budućnost Bemax 70–53 RMU Banovići (1 March 2021)
- Lowest attendance: No data for several matches 1 Orlovi 46–67 Budućnost Bemax (14 October 2020)
- All statistics correct as of July 25, 2022.

The 2020–21 WABA League was the 20th season of the Adriatic League. Competition included eight teams from five countries. In this season participating clubs from Serbia, Montenegro, Bosnia and Herzegovina, Bulgaria and Slovenia.

Vojvodina 021 informed the Board of the WABA League 23 february 2021 that due to obligations in the national championship and the Serbian Cup, it is not able to play the remaining seven games of the 2020-21 WABA League regular season. It means that Vojvodina 021 withdraws from the 2020-21 WABA League.

As per the Official Basketball Rules, the games (played and unplayed) were awarded to their respective opponents with a score of 20-0. Furthermore, the forfeiting team Vojvodina 021 will receive 0 classification points in the standings.

== Teams ==
=== Team allocation ===
Regular season
(Bulgaria) Montana 2003	(Bosnia and Herzegovina) RMU Banovići	(Slovenia) Cinkarna Celje	(Serbia) Vojvodina 021
(Bulgaria) Beroe	(Bosnia and Herzegovina) Orlovi	(Montenegro) Budućnost Bemax	(Serbia) Partizan 1953

=== Venues and locations ===
Location of teams in the 2020–21 WABA League
Location of teams in the 2020–21 WABA League

Team	Home city	Arena	Capacity
Beroe	Stara Zagora	Municipal Hall	1,000
Budućnost Bemax	Podgorica	Bemax Arena	2,500
Cinkarna Celje	Celje	Gimnazija Center Celje Hall	1,500
Montana 2003	Montana	Mladost Sports Hall	
Partizan 1953	Beograd	Ranko Žeravica Sports Hall	5,000
Vojvodina 021	Novi Sad	Petrovaradin Hall	900
Orlovi	Banja Luka		
RMU Banovići	Banovići	SKC Banovići	

== Regular season ==
In the Regular season was played with 8 teams and play a dual circuit system, each with each one game at home and away. The four best teams at the end of the regular season were placed in the Final Four. The regular season began on 14 October 2020 and it will end on 4 March 2021.

=== Standings ===
Pos	Team	Pld	W	L	PF	PA	PD	Pts	Qualification or relegation
1	(Bulgaria) Beroe	14	12	2	970	774	+196	26	Advance to the Final Four
2	(Montenegro) Budućnost Bemax	14	12	2	942	677	+265	26	Advance to the Final Four
3	(Slovenia) Cinkarna Celje	14	9	5	870	782	+88	23	Advance to the Final Four
4	(Bulgaria) Montana 2003	14	9	5	896	777	+119	23	Advance to the Final Four
5	(Bosnia and Herzegovina) Orlovi	14	7	7	861	830	+31	21	
6	(Serbia) Partizan 1953	14	4	10	782	981	−199	18	
7	(Bosnia and Herzegovina) RMU Banovići	14	3	11	774	994	−220	17	
8	(Serbia) Vojvodina 021	14	0	14	0	280	−280	14	

Updated to match(es) played on March 4, 2021. Source: WABA League

== Final Four ==
The Final Four was held on 20 and 21 March 2021 in Stara Zagora.

Semi-finals; 21 March
(Bulgaria) Beroe	82
(Bulgaria) Montana 2003	68
(Montenegro) Budućnost Bemax	70
(Slovenia) Cinkarna Celje	60

Final; 22 March
(Bulgaria) Beroe	66
(Montenegro) Budućnost Bemax	56
Third place
(Bulgaria) Montana 2003	68
(Slovenia) Cinkarna Celje	65

2020–21 Adriatic League champion

Beroe
2nd title

== Awards ==
- Final Four MVP: Jaklin Zlatanova (190-PF-88) of (Bulgaria) Beroe
- Player of the Year: Mina Đorđević (188-PF-99) of (Montenegro) Budućnost Bemax
- Guard of the Year: Matea Tavić (178-G-92) of (Bulgaria) Beroe
- Forward of Year: Mina Đorđević (188-PF-99) of (Montenegro) Budućnost Bemax
- Center of the Year: Jaklin Zlatanova (190-PF-88) of (Bulgaria) Beroe
- Newcomer of the Year: Dragana Domuzin (174-PG-00) of (Bosnia and Herzegovina) Orlovi
- Most Improved Player of Year: Mojca Jelenc (200-PF-03) of (Slovenia) Cinkarna Celje
- Defensive Player of Year: Sarah Boothe (195-F/C-90) of (Bulgaria) Beroe
- Coach of the Year: Tatyana Gateva of (Bulgaria) Beroe

1st Team

- Matea Tavić (178-G-92) of (Bulgaria) Beroe
- Dragana Domuzin (174-PG-00) of (Bosnia and Herzegovina) Orlovi
- Isabela Lyra (180-F-94) of (Bulgaria) Montana 2003
- Mina Đorđević (188-PF-99) of (Montenegro) Budućnost Bemax
- Jaklin Zlatanova (190-PF-88) of (Bulgaria) Beroe

2nd Team

- Snežana Aleksić (173-G-89) of (Bulgaria) Montana 2003
- Snežana Bogićević (183-SG-97) of (Slovenia) Cinkarna Celje
- Tamara Rajić (182-G/F-93) of (Bosnia and Herzegovina) Orlovi
- Patricia Bura (188-C-96) of (Montenegro) Budućnost Bemax
- Sarah Boothe (195-F/C-90) of (Bulgaria) Beroe

Honorable Mention

- Radostina Dimitrova (181-SF-94) of (Bulgaria) Beroe
- Dragana Živković (183-G-01) of (Montenegro) Budućnost Bemax
- Dimana Georgieva (188-F/C-88) of (Bulgaria) Montana 2003
- Vladinka Erak (192-C-84) of (Bosnia and Herzegovina) Orlovi

All-Defensive Team

- Victoria Stoycheva (165-PG-92) of (Bulgaria) Montana 2003
- Blaža Čeh (181-PG-03) of (Slovenia) Cinkarna Celje
- Isabela Lyra (180-F-94) of (Bulgaria) Montana 2003
- Patricia Bura (180-C-96) of (Montenegro) Budućnost Bemax
- Sarah Boothe (195-F/C-90) of (Bulgaria) Beroe

All-Newcomers Team

- Blaža Čeh (181-PG-03) of (Slovenia) Cinkarna Celje
- Dragana Domuzin (174-PG-00) of (Bosnia and Herzegovina) Orlovi
- Yana Karamfilova (175-F-05) of (Bulgaria) Beroe
- Sara Garić (183-F-03) (Slovenia) Cinkarna Celje
- Jite Gbemuotor (188-F-04) (Slovenia) Cinkarna Celje

== See also ==
- 2020–21 ABA League First Division
- 2020–21 First Women's Basketball League of Serbia
