= 2018–19 Milan Ciga Vasojević Cup =

2019 Milan Ciga Vasojević Cup
- Season: 2018–19
- Duration: March 16–17, 2019
- Games played: 3
- Teams: 4

Finals
- Champions: Crvena zvezda Kombank
- Runners-up: Radivoj Korać

The 2019 Milan Ciga Vasojević Cup is the 13th season of the Serbian women's national basketball cup tournament.,

The tournament was held in Loznica from March 16–17, 2019. Crvena zvezda Kombank won the tournament.

== Qualified teams ==
Basketball League of Serbia	Cup of Serbia (2nd-tier)
Crvena zvezda Kombank (1st); 021 (3rd); Novosadska ŽKA (4th)	Radivoj Korać (Winner)

== Venue ==
Loznica	2018–19 Milan Ciga Vasojević Cup (Serbia)
Lagator Hall	2018–19 Milan Ciga Vasojević Cup (Serbia)
Capacity: 2,236	2018–19 Milan Ciga Vasojević Cup (Serbia)

== Bracket ==
Semifinals
16 March
Crvena zvezda Kombank	60
Novosadska ŽKA	49
16 March
Radivoj Korać	72
021	71

Final
17 March
Crvena zvezda Kombank	56
Radivoj Korać	55

== Semifinals ==
=== Crvena zvezda Kombank v Novosadska ŽKA ===
16 March 2019
16:00

Boxscore

Crvena zvezda Kombank	60–49	Novosadska ŽKA
Scoring by quarter: 15–23, 10–13, 15–6, 20–7
Pts: Đorđević 18; Rebs: Đorđević 9 Asts: Bojović, A. Katanić 5		Pts: Radulović 12; Rebs: Mitrović 16; Asts: Radulović 3

Lagator Hall, Loznica
Attendance: 550
Referees: Jasmina Juras, Nataša Virijević, Uroš Dojčinović

=== Radivoj Korać v 021 ===
16 March 2019
18:30

Boxscore

Radivoj Korać	72–71	021
Scoring by quarter: 22–19, 14–24, 17–18, 19–10
Pts: Tomašević 21; Rebs: Vučković 8 Asts: Vukosavljević 5		Pts: Adamović 34; Rebs: Adamović 12; Asts: Adamović 4

Lagator Hall, Loznica
Attendance: 550
Referees: Ivana Ivanović, Dejan Mizdrak, Miroslava Jovičin

== Final ==
17 March 2019
17:00

Boxscore

Crvena zvezda Kombank	56–55	Radivoj Korać
Scoring by quarter: 9–19, 14–15, 21–9, 12–12
Pts: Đorđević 16; Rebs: Đorđević 7 Asts: I. Katanić 7		Pts: Vučković 16; Rebs: Stojiljković 15; Asts: Tomašević, Vukosavljević 3

Lagator Hall, Loznica
Attendance: 600
Referees: Jasmina Juras, Ivana Ivanović, Nataša Virijević

== See also ==
- 2018–19 Women's Basketball League of Serbia
- 2018–19 Radivoj Korać Cup
