= 2016–17 Milan Ciga Vasojević Cup =

Milan Ciga Vasojević Cup 2016–17
- League: Milan Ciga Vasojević Cup
- Sport: Basketball
- Duration: 11–12 March 2017
- Total attendance: 1750
- TV partner(s): RTS; Arena Sport

2016–17
- Season champions: Crvena zvezda (12th title)
- Finals champions: Crvena zvezda
- Runners-up: Radivoj Korać

Milan Ciga Vasojević Cup seasons
- ← 2015–16 2017–18 →

The 2016–17 Milan Ciga Vasojević Cup season is the 11th season of the Serbian national women's basketball cup tournament.

The competition started on 11 March and concluded with the Final on 12 March 2017.

== Teams ==
Four teams competed in this years cup.

Seeded	Unseeded
Radivoj Korać	Partizan 1953
Crvena zvezda	Vršac

== Bracket ==
Semi-finals
March 11, 2017
Crvena zvezda	53
Partizan 1953	50
March 11, 2017
Radivoj Korać	75
Vršac	47

Final
March 12, 2017
Crvena zvezda	84
Radivoj Korać	66

== Semifinals ==
11 March 2017
16:00

Report

Crvena zvezda	53–50	Partizan 1953
Scoring by quarter: 7:8, 8:14, 26:16, 12:12
Pts: Mišeljić 16; Rebs: A. Katanić 6 Asts: A. Katanić 7		Pts: Milovanović 13; Rebs: Stepanović 10; Asts: Orozović, Vidović 3

SPC Vojvodina, Novi Sad
Attendance: 400
Referees: Smiljanić, Grujić, Pavlica

11 March 2017
18:00

Report

Radivoj Korać	75–47	Vršac
Scoring by quarter: 20:11, 13:11, 24:18, 18:7
Pts: Tudurić, Spasojević 19; Rebs: Tudurić 11; Asts: Nikolić 4		Pts: Radović 16; Rebs: Mitov, Radović 5 Asts: Mršić 3

SPC Vojvodina, Novi Sad
Attendance: 250
Referees: Juras, Virijević, Savić

== Final ==
12 March 2017
16:00

Report

Crvena zvezda	84–66	Radivoj Korać
Scoring by quarter: 23:8, 19:19, 20:23, 22:16
Pts: A. Katanić 18; Rebs: Đorđević 12; Asts: Prlja 6		Pts: Stojiljković 12; Rebs: Stevanović 6 Asts: Tudurić 3

SPC Vojvodina, Novi Sad
Attendance: 1100
Referees: Juras, Ivanović, Virijević

2016–17 Milan Ciga Vasojević Cup

Crvena zvezda
12 title
