= 2017–18 First Women's Basketball League of Serbia =

First Women's League of Serbia
- Season: 2017–18
- Duration: October 7, 2017 – March 14, 2018 (Regular season); March 31, 2018 – April 2018 (Playoffs)
- Teams: 12

Regular season
- Top seed: Crvena zvezda
- Relegated: Šumadija; Vršac

Finals
- Champions: Crvena zvezda
- Runners-up: Partizan 1953
- Semifinalists: Radivoj Korać; Kraljevo
- All statistics correct as of 10 March 2018.

The 2017–18 First Women's Basketball League of Serbia is the 12th season of the First Women's Basketball League of Serbia, the highest professional basketball league in Serbia. It is also 74th national championship played by Serbian clubs inclusive of nation's previous incarnations as Yugoslavia and Serbia and Montenegro.

The first half of the season consists of 12 teams and 132-game regular season (22 games for each of the 12 teams).

== Teams ==
=== Venues and locations ===
Location of teams in the 2017–18 season

Team	City	Arena	Capacity
021 Beočin	Beočin	Sports center Beočin	600
Bor	Bor	Sports center Bor	3,000
Crvena zvezda	Belgrade	Basket city Hall	1.600
Kraljevo	Kraljevo	Kraljevo Sports Hall	3.350
Partizan 1953	Belgrade	Sports Hall Ranko Žeravica; Hall Vizura Sport	5.000; 1.500
Radivoj Korać	Belgrade	SC Šumice; Sport EKO Hall	2.000; 1.000
Spartak	Subotica	Sport Palace Subotica	3.500
Student Niš	Niš	Dušan Radović School Hall	1.000
Vrbas Medela	Vrbas	CFK Vrbas	2.500
Vršac	Vršac	Millennium Center	5.000
Šabac	Šabac	Šabac High School Hall	500
Šumadija	Kragujevac	Hall Gordana Goca Bogojević	600

Teams that play in the 2017–18 Adriatic League

== Regular season ==
=== Standings ===
Pos	Team	Pld	W	L	PF	PA	PD	Pts	Qualification or relegation
1	Crvena zvezda	22	21	1	1865	1258	+607	43	Qualification to the Playoffs
2	Partizan 1953	22	19	3	1859	1342	+517	41	Qualification to the Playoffs
3	Kraljevo	22	17	5	1585	1304	+281	39	Qualification to the Playoffs
4	Radivoj Korać	22	16	6	1626	1446	+180	38	Qualification to the Playoffs
5	Student	22	13	9	1635	1410	+225	35	
6	Šabac	22	11	11	1691	1604	+87	33	
7	021 Beočin	22	11	11	1608	1527	+81	33	
8	Bor	22	9	13	1382	1501	−119	31	
9	Vrbas Medela	22	8	14	1542	1594	−52	30	
10	Spartak	22	4	18	1523	1755	−232	26	
11	Šumadija	22	2	20	1326	2023	−697	24	Relegation to the Second League
12	Vršac	22	1	21	1102	1980	−878	23	Relegation to the Second League

Source: FWLS

== Playoffs ==
Source: Srbijasport

=== Bracket ===
Semifinals; 31 Mar–11 Apr 2018
Crvena zvezda	2
Radivoj Korać	0
Partizan 1953	2
Kraljevo	0

Final; April 2018
Crvena zvezda	3
Partizan 1953	1

=== Semifinals ===
Team 1	Series	Team 2	Game 1	Game 2	Game 3
Crvena zvezda	2–0	Radivoj Korać	75–45	64–55	—
Partizan 1953	2–0	Kraljevo	80–78	66–56	—

=== Finals ===
Team 1	Series	Team 2	Game 1	Game 2	Game 3	Game 4	Game 5
Crvena zvezda	3–1	Partizan 1953	73–80	85–59	65–54	75–45	—

== See also ==
- 2017–18 Milan Ciga Vasojević Cup
- 2017–18 Basketball League of Serbia
- 2017–18 WABA League
