= 2016 Milan Ciga Vasojević Cup =

Milan Ciga Vasojević Cup 2016
- League: Milan Ciga Vasojević Cup
- Sport: Basketball
- Duration: 19–20 March 2016
- Total attendance: 4400
- TV partner(s): RTS; Arena Sport

2015–16
- Season champions: Crvena zvezda (11th title)
- Finals champions: Crvena zvezda
- Runners-up: Vrbas Medela

Milan Ciga Vasojević Cup seasons
- ← 2014–15 2016–17 →

The 2016 Milan Ciga Vasojević Cup season is the 10th season of the Serbian national women's basketball cup tournament.

The competition started on 19 March and concluded with the Final on 20 March 2016.

== Teams ==
Four teams competed in this years cup.

Seeded	Unseeded
Radivoj Korać	Vrbas Medela
Crvena zvezda	Vršac Swisslion

== Bracket ==
Semi-finals
March 19, 2016
Crvena zvezda	64
Vršac Swisslion	56
March 19, 2016
Radivoj Korać	49
Vrbas Medela	55

Final
March 20, 2016
Crvena zvezda	71
Vrbas Medela	66

=== Semifinals ===
19 March 2016
16:30

Report

Crvena zvezda	64–56	Vršac Swisslion
Scoring by quarter: 13:12, 18:17, 17:13, 16:14
Pts: Zec 17; Rebs: Đorđević 7 Asts: Čolić 3		Pts: M. Mandić 20; Rebs: M. Mandić 14; Asts: M. Mandić 3

CFK Drago Jovović, Vrbas
Attendance: 600
Referees: Smiljanić, Virijević, Grujić

19 March 2016
19:00

Report

Radivoj Korać	49–55	Vrbas Medela
Scoring by quarter: 17:17, 16:14, 9:10, 7:14
Pts: S. Mandić, Bučevac 13; Rebs: Pašić 10; Asts: S. Mandić 6		Pts: Džombeta 27; Rebs: Mijatović 7 Asts: Cukić 10

CFK Drago Jovović, Vrbas
Attendance: 1800
Referees: Juras, Ivanović, Savić

=== Final ===
20 March 2016
17:00

Report

Crvena zvezda	71–66	Vrbas Medela
Scoring by quarter: 24:22, 22:10, 17:23, 8:11
Pts: Zec, Đorđević 17; Rebs: Đorđević 11; Asts: Katanić, Čolić 5		Pts: Jovović 23; Rebs: Rajić 8 Asts: Džombeta 4

CFK Drago Jovović, Vrbas
Attendance: 2000
Referees: Juras, Smiljanić, Pavlica

2015–16 Milan Ciga Vasojević Cup

Crvena zvezda
11th Title
