= 2020–21 Milan Ciga Vasojević Cup =

2021 Milan Ciga Vasojević Cup
- Season: 2020–21
- Duration: 13–14 March 2021
- Games played: 3
- Teams: 4
- TV partner(s): Arena Sport

Regular season
- Season MVP: Višnja Stefanović

Finals
- Champions: Art Basket
- Runners-up: Vojvodina 021

The 2021 Milan Ciga Vasojević Cup is the 15th season of the Serbian women's national basketball cup tournament.,

The tournament was held in Vršac from 13 to 14 March 2021. Art Basket won the tournament.

== Qualified teams ==
Cup of Serbia (2nd-tier)
Vojvodina 021
Crvena zvezda Kombank
Radivoj Korać
Art Basket

== Venue ==
Vršac	2020–21 Milan Ciga Vasojević Cup (Serbia)
Millennium Centar	2020–21 Milan Ciga Vasojević Cup (Serbia)
Capacity: 4,400	2020–21 Milan Ciga Vasojević Cup (Serbia)

== Bracket ==
Semifinals
13 March
Vojvodina 021	71
Crvena zvezda Kombank	59
13 March
Art Basket	81
Radivoj Korać	67

Final
14 March
Vojvodina 021	74
Art Basket	83

== Semifinals ==
=== Vojvodina 021 v Crvena zvezda Kombank ===
13 March 2021
12:30

Report

Vojvodina 021	71–59	Crvena zvezda Kombank
Scoring by quarter: 18:13, 18:19, 15:14, 20:13
Pts: Adamović 21; Rebs: Mišeljić 9 Asts: Jakovljević, Adamović 5 each		Pts: Naumčev 21; Rebs: Janković 11; Asts: Katanić 3

Millennium Centar, Vršac
Attendance: 10
Referees: J. Smiljanić, I. Ivanović, Vladimir Jevtović

=== Art Basket v Radivoj Korać ===
13 March 2021
15:00

Report

Art Basket	81–67	Radivoj Korać
Scoring by quarter: 27:17, 13:29, 27:9, 14:12
Pts: Čolić 27; Rebs: Čolić, Ma. Mitrović 8 Asts: Čolić 6		Pts: Loomis 20; Rebs: Loomis 15; Asts: Mi. Mitrović, Vukosavljević 3

Millennium Centar, Vršac
Attendance: 20
Referees: Jasmina Juras, Stefan Ćalić, Strahinja Dašić

== Final ==
14 March 2021
13:00

Report

Vojvodina 021	74–83	Art Basket
Scoring by quarter: 19–18, 24–24, 17–18, 14–23
Pts: Adamović 31; Rebs: Mišeljić 9 Asts: Mišeljić 4		Pts: Zec 19; Rebs: Stefanović 12; Asts: Zec 7

Millennium Centar, Vršac
Attendance: 15
Referees: Vladimir Jevtović, Nikola Miloradović, Strahinja Dašić

== See also ==
- 2020–21 First Women's Basketball League of Serbia
- 2020–21 Radivoj Korać Cup
