= TK Crvena zvezda =

Serbian tennis club

- Founded: 22 April 1946; 80 years ago
- Based in: Belgrade, Serbia
- Colors
- Website: tkcrvenazvezda.com

Teniski klub Crvena zvezda is a tennis club from Belgrade, Serbia. The club is part of the SD Crvena Zvezda. The club was founded as a section of Red Star on 22 April 1946.

== Honours and achievements ==
=== Men ===
- National Championships
  - Winners (26): 1974, 1975, 1976, 1978, 1979, 1982, 1983, 1984, 1998, 1999, 2000, 2002, 2004, 2006, 2008, 2009, 2010, 2011, 2012, 2013, 2014, 2015, 2016, 2017, 2018, 2022
- European Champions Cup
  - Quarter-finalists (4): 1979, 1985, 2000, 2001

=== Women ===
- National Championships
  - Winners (16): 1998, 1999, 2001, 2002, 2003, 2004, 2005, 2006, 2007, 2008, 2011, 2014, 2015, 2018, 2025, 2026

== Notable players ==
=== Men ===
- (Socialist Federal Republic of Yugoslavia) Slobodan Živojinović - No. 1 tennis player in the world in doubles
- (Socialist Federal Republic of Yugoslavia) Dragan Savić
- (Socialist Federal Republic of Yugoslavia) Zoltan Ilin
- (North Macedonia) Aleksandar Kitinov
- (Serbia and Montenegro) Nebojša Đorđević
- (Serbia and Montenegro) Dejan Petrović
- (Serbia and Montenegro) Alex Vlaški
- (Bulgaria) Milen Velev
- (Bulgaria) Ivaylo Traykov
- (Venezuela) Jimy Szymanski
- (Serbia) Nenad Zimonjić - No. 1 tennis player in the world in doubles
- (Serbia) Viktor Troicki - No. 12 tennis player in the world
- (Serbia) Boris Pašanski - No. 55 tennis player in the world
- (Serbia) Ilija Bozoljac
- (Serbia) Nikola Ćirić
- (Serbia) David Savić
- (Serbia) Miljan Zekić
- (Serbia) Danilo Petrović
- (Serbia) Nikola Milojević
- Miomir Kecmanovic - No. 27 tennis player in the world
- Ivko Plecevic
- Nikola Gnjatovic
- Aleksandar Slovic
- Petko Milojkovic
- Djordje Kostic
- Branko Kuzmanovic
- Ivan Bjelica
- Ognjen Jovanovic
- Stefan Milicevic

=== Women ===
- (Serbia and Montenegro) Dragana Zarić
- (Serbia and Montenegro) Katarina Mišić
- (Serbia) Jelena Janković - No. 1 tennis player in the world singles
- (Serbia) Aleksandra Krunić - No. 39 tennis player in the world in singles and number 35 player in the world in doubles
- (Serbia) Ana Timotić
- (Serbia) Ana Jovanović
- (Montenegro) Danica Krstajić
- Sandra Jukic
- Danka Petrovic
- Dragana Ilic
- Bojana Jovanovski - No. 32 player in the world singles
