= Basketball Federation of Serbia =

Sports governing body

- Sport: Basketball
- Jurisdiction: Serbia
- Abbreviation: KSS
- Founded: 1948; 78 years ago
- Affiliation: FIBA
- Affiliation date: 1936
- Regional affiliation: FIBA Europe
- Headquarters: Belgrade
- President: Nebojša Čović
- Vice president(s): Nenad Krstić; Ana Joković; Filip Sunturlić; Darko Jović
- Secretary: Zlatko Bolić
- Men's coach: Dušan Alimpijević
- Women's coach: Miloš Pavlović
- Replaced: Basketball Federation of Serbia and Montenegro (1992–2006); Basketball Federation of Yugoslavia (1948–1992)

Official website
- kss.rs
- (Serbia)

The Basketball Federation of Serbia (Serbian: Кошаркашки савез Србије, КСС, romanized: Košarkaški savez Srbije, KSS) is a non-profit organization and the national sports governing body for basketball in Serbia.

The organization represents Serbia in FIBA and the men's and women's national basketball teams in the Olympic Committee of Serbia. The Federation traditionally selects the Serbian Basketball Player of the Year.

== Structure ==
=== Managing board ===
According to the Federation Statute, the Managing Board is constituted by the representatives elected through a semi-mandatory system. This means that a half of the executive body members is appointed by the President and the remaining four will be elected by The Federation Assembly. The Managing Board members are elected on four-year mandate.

Position	Department/Region	Name
President		Nebojša Čović
Vice-Presidents	Men’s Basketball	Nenad Krstić
Vice-Presidents	Women’s Basketball	Ana Joković
Vice-Presidents	Competitions	Darko Jovičić
Vice-Presidents	Marketing and Finance	Filip Sunturlić
Representatives of the Regional Associations	Belgrade	Dragana Kontić
Representatives of the Regional Associations	Vojvodina	Darko Karan
Representatives of the Regional Associations	West Serbia	Marko Ivanović
Representatives of the Regional Associations	East Serbia	Miodrag Kostić
Board members without portfolio		Suzana Vasiljević
Board members without portfolio		Dragan Marković
Board members without portfolio		Zoran Petrović
Board members without portfolio		Aleksandar Seratlić

==== Presidents ====
#	Years	Name
1	2007–2011	Dragan Kapičić
2	2011–2016	Dragan Đilas
3	2016–2024	Predrag Danilović
4	2024–present	Nebojša Čović

=== Secretary General ===
#	Years	Name
1	2006–2007	Predrag Bogosavljev
2	2007–2009	Predrag Bojić
3	2009–2011	Zoran Gavrilović
4	2011–2015	Andrija Kleut
5	2015–2019	Dejan Tomašević
6	2019–2024	Zlatko Bolić
7	2024–2025	Filip Sunturlić (acting)
8	2025–present	Mićo Radanović

== Logos ==
2006–2018	2018–present

== National teams' medals ==
=== Basketball ===
Age group	Men	Women
Senior (Men's) (Women's)	2009 EuroBasket; 2014 World Championship; 2016 Summer Olympics; 2017 EuroBasket	2015 EuroBasket; 2021 EuroBasket; 2016 Summer Olympics; 2019 EuroBasket
U-20 (Men's) (Women's)	2007 Europe Championship; 2008 Europe Championship; 2015 Europe Championship; 2014 Europe Championship	2007 Europe Championship; 2018 Europe Championship; 2008 Europe Championship
U-19 (Men's) (Women's)	2007 World Championship; 2011 World Championship; 2013 World Championship	2007 World Championship
U-18 (Men's) (Women's)	2007 Europe Championship; 2009 Europe Championship; 2017 Europe Championship; 2018 Europe Championship; 2011 Europe Championship; 2014 Europe Championship; 2012 Europe Championship	2007 Europe Championship; 2017 Europe Championship; 2012 Europe Championship; 2013 Europe Championship
U-17 (Men's) (Women's)	2014 World Championship	N/A
U-16 (Men's) (Women's)	2007 Europe Championship; 2013 Europe Championship; 2009 Europe Championship; 2012 Europe Championship; 2017 Europe Championship	N/A
University (Men's) (Women's)	2009 Summer Universiade; 2011 Summer Universiade; 2007 Summer Universiade; 2013 Summer Universiade	N/A

=== 3x3 ===
Selection	Men	Women
Senior (Men's) (Women's)	2012 World Championships; 2016 World Championships; 2017 World Cup; 2018 World Cup; 2018 Europe Cup; 2019 Europe Cup; 2014 World Championships; 2016 Europe Championships; 2015 European Games; 2020 Olympic Games	N/A
U-18 (Men's)	2010 Youth Olympics; 2012 World Championship	N/A

== Club competitions ==
=== Major ===
Competitions	Men	Women
National League, 1st tier	Basketball League of Serbia	Basketball League of Serbia
National Cup	Radivoj Korać Cup	Milan Ciga Vasojević Cup

==== Current champions ====
Note: These lists are correct through the end of the 2019–20 season.

Competitions	Men	Women
National League	Crvena zvezda (2020–21)	Crvena zvezda (2020–21)
National Cup	Crvena zvezda (2020–21)	Art Basket (2020–21)

=== Minor ===
- Second Men's League of Serbia (2nd-tier)
- First Regional Men's League (3rd-tier)
- Second Regional Men's League (4th-tier)
- Men's League Cup (2nd-tier)

== Hall of Fame inductees ==
- Naismith Memorial Basketball Hall of Fame
  - Borislav Stanković (1991, contributor)
  - Aleksandar Nikolić (1998, coach)
  - Dražen Dalipagić (2004, player)
  - Vlade Divac (2019, player)
  - Radivoj Korać (2022, player)
- FIBA Hall of Fame
  - Nebojša Popović (contributor)
  - Borislav Stanković (contributor)
  - Radomir Šaper (contributor)
  - Aleksandar Nikolić (2007, coach)
  - Ranko Žeravica (2007, coach)
  - Obrad Belošević (2007, technical official)
  - Radivoj Korać (2007, player)
  - Dražen Dalipagić (2007, player)
  - Dragan Kićanović (2010, player)
  - Vlade Divac (2010, player)
  - Zoran Slavnić (2013, player)
  - Dušan Ivković (2017, coach)
  - Svetislav Pešić (2020, coach)
  - Milan Vasojević (2022, coach)
- Women's Basketball Hall of Fame
  - Borislav Stanković (2000, contributor)
  - Jasmina Perazić (2014, player)

== See also ==
- List of Serbian NBA players
