= KK Loznica =

Basketball club in Loznica, Serbia

Loznica
- Leagues: Second League of Serbia
- Founded: 1963; 62 years ago
- History: KK Loznica (1963–present)
- Arena: Lagator Hall
- Location: Loznica
- Team colors: Green, yellow
- President: Danilo Negovanović
- Division titles: 1 Second MRL Western G1 (2019)
- Website: kkloznica.com

Košarkaški klub Loznica (Serbian Cyrillic: Кошаркашки клуб Лозница, transl. Basketball Club Loznica), commonly referred to as KK Loznica, is a men's basketball club based in Loznica, Serbia. They are currently competing in the 2nd-tier Second League of Serbia. The club was founded in 1963.

== Home arenas ==
The team play domestic home matches in the Lagator Hall.

== See also ==
- ŽKK Loznica
