= 2017–18 Milan Ciga Vasojević Cup =

2018 Milan Ciga Vasojević Cup
- Season: 2017–18
- Duration: March 16–17, 2018
- Games played: 3
- Teams: 4
- TV partner: Arena Sport

Regular season
- Season MVP: (Serbia) Ivanka Matić

Finals
- Champions: Partizan 1953
- Runners-up: Crvena zvezda

The 2018 Milan Ciga Vasojević Cup was the 12th season of the Serbian women's national basketball cup tournament.

== Venue ==
Banja Koviljača	2017–18 Milan Ciga Vasojević Cup (Serbia)
Vera Blagojević Sports Hall	2017–18 Milan Ciga Vasojević Cup (Serbia)
Capacity: N/A	2017–18 Milan Ciga Vasojević Cup (Serbia)

== Qualified teams ==
Basketball League of Serbia	Cup of Serbia (2nd-tier)
Crvena zvezda (1st); Partizan 1953 (2nd); Kraljevo (3rd)	Radivoj Korać (Winner)

The draw was held in Belgrade on 8 March 2018.

== Bracket ==
Semifinals
16 March
Crvena zvezda	72
Kraljevo	58
16 March
Partizan 1953	71
Radivoj Korać	67

Final
17 March
Crvena zvezda	61
Partizan 1953	68

== Semifinals ==
=== Crvena zvezda v Kraljevo ===
16 March 2018
17:00

Boxscore

Crvena zvezda	72–58	Kraljevo
Scoring by quarter: 22–13, 16–11, 12–18, 22–16
Pts: Bogićević 20; Rebs: Bogićević 9 Asts: Stjepanović 6		Pts: Bajić, Katić 16; Rebs: Ali Bra 24; Asts: Bajić 6

Vera Blagojević Sports Hall, Banja Koviljača
Attendance: 450
Referees: Jelena Smiljanić, Dejan Savić, Stefan Calić

=== Partizan 1953 v Radivoj Korać ===
16 March 2018
20:00

Boxscore

Partizan 1953	71–67	Radivoj Korać
Scoring by quarter: 17–19, 22–16, 17–16, 15–16
Pts: Stepanović 21; Rebs: Stepanović 7 Asts: Mitrović 6		Pts: Tomašević 27; Rebs: Turudić 6 Asts: Marjanović 4

Vera Blagojević Sports Hall, Banja Koviljača
Attendance: 300
Referees: Jasmina Juras, Ivana Ivanović, Andrija Dimovski

== Final ==
17 March 2018
19:00

Boxscore

Crvena zvezda	61–68	Partizan 1953
Scoring by quarter: 21–24, 17–18, 19–12, 4–14
Pts: Katanić 13; Rebs: Stjepanović 6 Asts: Stjepanović 4		Pts: Matić 30; Rebs: Matić 16; Asts: Claussen 5

Vera Blagojević Sports Hall, Banja Koviljača
Attendance: 1,200
Referees: Jasmina Juras, Jelena Smiljanić, Dejan Savić

== See also ==
- 2017–18 First Women's Basketball League of Serbia
- 2017–18 Radivoj Korać Cup
