= 2020–21 First Women's Basketball League of Serbia =

- Season: 2020–21
- Duration: 26 September 2020 – 7 March 2021 (Regular season); 20 March 2021 – 12 April 2021 (Playoffs)
- Games played: 132 (Regular season)
- Teams: 12

Regular season
- Relegated: Novosadska ŽKA; Spartak Subotica

Finals
- Champions: Crvena zvezda Kombank (32nd title)
- Runners-up: Art Basket
- Semifinalists: Vojvodina 021; Radivoj Korać
- All statistics correct as of 9 April 2021.

The 2020–21 First Women's Basketball League of Serbia (Serbian Cyrillic: Прва женска лига Србије 2020–21.) is the 15th season of the First Women's Basketball League of Serbia, the highest professional basketball league in Serbia. Also, it's the 77th national championship played by Serbian clubs inclusive of the nation's previous incarnations as Yugoslavia and Serbia & Montenegro.

Crvena zvezda Kombank won its 32nd national championship.

== Teams ==
=== Promotion and relegation ===
Teams promoted from the Second League

- Spartak Subotica
- Art Basket
- Duga Šabac

Teams relegated to the Second League

- Proleter 023

=== Venues and locations ===
Location of teams in the 2020–21 season

Team	City	Arena	Capacity
Art Basket	Belgrade	Mega Factory Hall	500
Crvena zvezda Kombank	Belgrade	Basket City Hall	1,600
Duga Šabac	Šabac	Protić Sports Hall	n/a
Kraljevo	Kraljevo	Kraljevo Sports Hall	3,350
Novosadska ŽKA	Novi Sad	SPC Vojvodina	6,987
Partizan 1953	Belgrade	Vizura Sports Center	1,500
Radivoj Korać	Belgrade	Radivoj Korać Hall	n/a
Radnički Kragujevac	Kragujevac	Gordana Goca Bogojević Hall	800
Spartak Subotica	Subotica	Dudova Šuma Hall	2,500
Student Niš	Niš	Dušan Radović School Hall	1,000
Vojvodina 021	Novi Sad	Petrovaradin Hall; SPC Vojvodina	900; 6,987
Vrbas Medela	Vrbas	CFK Drago Jovović	2,500

Team that play in the 2020–21 Adriatic League

== Regular season ==
=== Standings ===
Pos	Team	Pld	W	L	PF	PA	PD	Pts	Qualification or relegation
1	Vojvodina 021	22	19	3	1749	1301	+448	41 (Note: Vojvodina 021 2–0 Crvena zvezda Kombank)	Qualification to the Playoffs
2	Crvena zvezda Kombank	22	19	3	1856	1352	+504	41	Qualification to the Playoffs
3	Radivoj Korać	22	18	4	1875	1564	+311	40	Qualification to the Playoffs
4	Art Basket	22	17	5	1666	1367	+299	39	Qualification to the Playoffs
5	Kraljevo	22	13	9	1607	1484	+123	35	
6	Partizan 1953	22	10	12	1532	1522	+10	32	
7	Student Niš	22	8	14	1353	1599	−246	30	
8	Radnički Kragujevac	22	7	15	1474	1657	−183	29 (Note: Radnički Kragujevac +17, Vrbas Medela 0, Duga Šabac –17)	
9	Vrbas Medela	22	7	15	1329	1552	−223	29	
10	Duga Šabac	22	7	15	1393	1599	−206	29	
11	Novosadska ŽKA	22	6	16	1444	1647	−203	28	Relegation to the Second League
12	Spartak Subotica	22	1	21	1365	1999	−634	23	Relegation to the Second League

Source: SrbijaSport, KSS

== Playoffs ==
Four teams were qualified for the Playoffs, as follows: Vojvodina 021, Crvena zvezda Kombank, Radivoj Korać, and Art Basket.

=== Bracket ===
Semifinals
20–27 March
Crvena zvezda Kombank	2
Radivoj Korać	1
20–28 March
Vojvodina 021	1
Art Basket	2

Finals
3–8 April
Crvena zvezda Kombank	2
Art Basket	1

=== Semifinals ===
Team 1	Series	Team 2	Game 1	Game 2	Game 3
Vojvodina 021	1–2	Art Basket	74–60	47–80	61–68
Crvena zvezda Kombank	2–1	Radivoj Korać	57–60	82–60	73–64

=== Finals ===
Team 1	Series	Team 2	Game 1	Game 2	Game 3
Crvena zvezda Kombank	2–1	Art Basket	76–59	64–69	77–61

== See also ==
- 2020–21 Milan Ciga Vasojević Cup
- 2020–21 Basketball League of Serbia
- 2020–21 WABA League
