= List of FIBA Europe and Euroleague Basketball club competition winners =

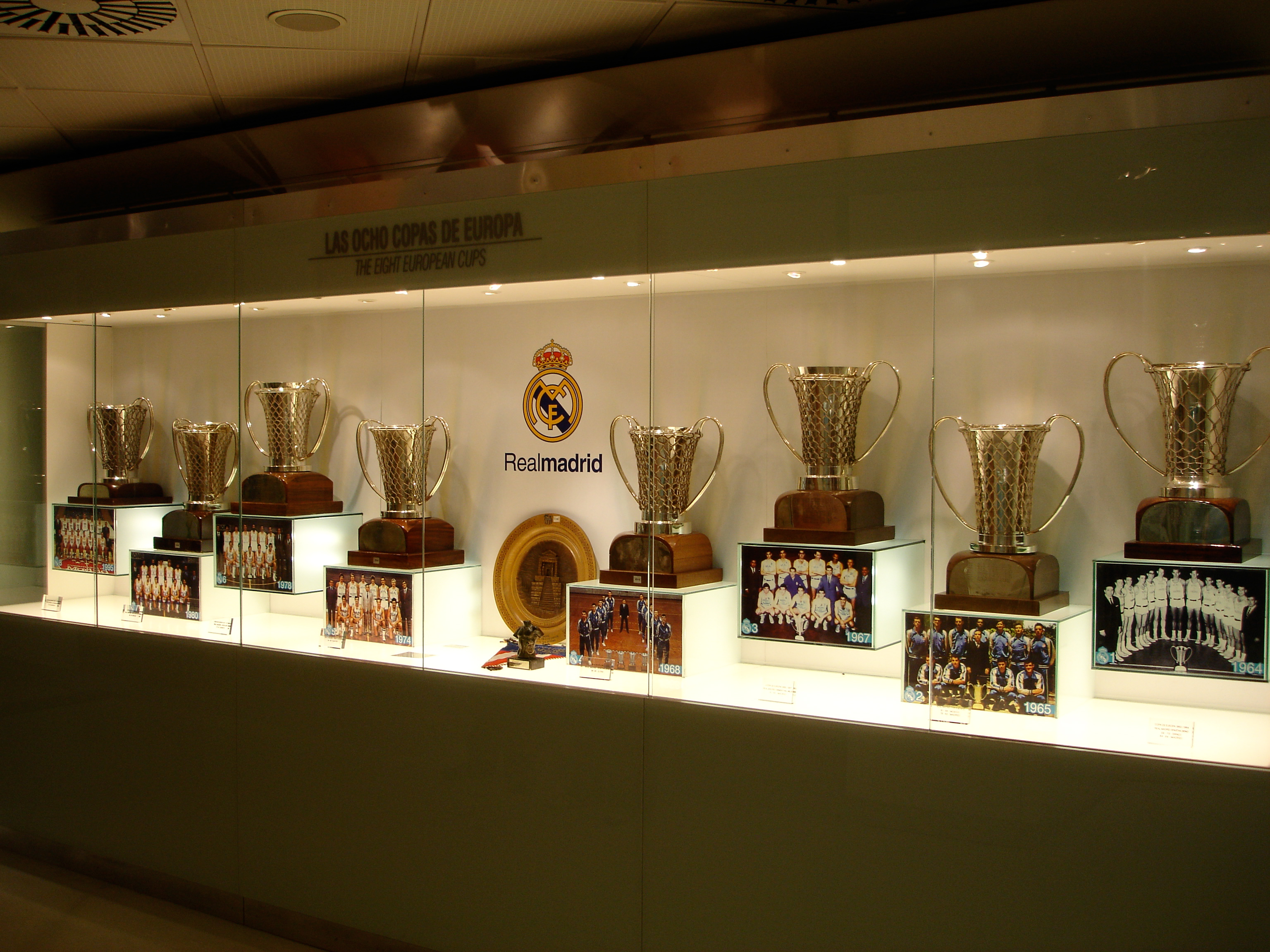
Real Madrid BC European trophies displayed in the club's museum.

The FIBA Europe is the governing body for Basketball in Europe; along with the Euroleague Basketball Organization and the ULEB they organize five main active club competitions for men: the Euroleague (formerly European Cup), the EuroCup Basketball, the EuroLeague SuperCup, the FIBA Champions League and the FIBA Europe Cup. There are also another four former FIBA Europe club competitions: FIBA Saporta Cup (1966–2002), FIBA Korać Cup (1971–2002), FIBA EuroCup Challenge (2002–2007) and FIBA EuroChallenge (2003–2015). The European Basketball Club Super Cup and the FIBA SuproLeague are considered semi–official tournaments by FIBA Europe and thus not included in this list.

Spanish side Real Madrid have won a record total of 18 titles in European competitions, seven more than Italian club Cantù. The Spanish clubs have won the most titles (46) ahead of clubs from Italy (44) and from Greece (20).

== Winners ==
=== By club ===
The following table lists all the men's clubs that have won at least one European major club competition, and is updated as of 25 May 2026 (in chronological order).

Key

FEL	Euroleague
FEB	EuroCup Basketball
FCL	Champions League
FEC	FIBA Europe Cup
ESC	EuroLeague SuperCup
FSC	FIBA Saporta Cup(defunct)
FKC	FIBA Korać Cup(defunct)
ECC	FIBA EuroChallenge (defunct)
FECC	FIBA EuroCup Challenge (defunct)

Most in category

List of European majors club competition winners
Rk.	Club	FEL	FEB	FCL	FEC	ESC	FSC	FKC	ECC	FECC	Total
1	(Spain) Real Madrid	11	1			1	4	1			18
2	(Italy) Cantù	2					4	4			10
3	(Russia) (Soviet Union) CSKA Moscow	8									8
=	(Italy) Olimpia Milano	3					3	2			8
5	(Greece) Panathinaikos	7									7
=	(Italy) Varese	5					2				7
7	(Israel) Maccabi Tel Aviv	6									6
=	(Italy) Virtus Bologna	2	1	1			1		1		6
=	(Spain) Barcelona	2					2	2			6
10	(Croatia) (Socialist Federal Republic of Yugoslavia) Split	3						2			5
=	(Croatia) (Socialist Federal Republic of Yugoslavia) Cibona	2					2	1			5
=	(Spain) Joventut Badalona	1	1					2	1		5
=	(France) Limoges CSP	1					1	3			5
14	(Greece) Olympiacos Piraeus	4									4
=	(Serbia) (Socialist Federal Republic of Yugoslavia) Partizan	1						3			4
=	(Spain) Valencia		4								4
=	(Spain) Málaga		1	2				1			4
18	(Latvia) (Soviet Union) Rīgas ASK	3									3
=	(Turkey) Anadolu Efes	2						1			3
=	(Italy) Virtus Roma	1						2			3
=	(Lithuania) Rytas Vilnius		2	1							3
=	(Greece) AEK Athens			1			2				3
=	(Greece) Aris Thessaloniki						1	1		1	3
24	(Turkey) Fenerbahçe	2									2
=	(Lithuania) Žalgiris Kaunas	1					1				2
=	(Russia) Khimki		2								2
=	(Russia) UNICS Kazan		1						1		2
=	(Spain) San Pablo Burgos			2							2
=	(Spain) Canarias			2							2
=	(Spain) Bilbao Basket				2						2
=	(France) Nanterre 92				1				1		2
=	(Russia) (Soviet Union) Spartak Saint Petersburg						2				2
=	(Italy) Treviso						2				2
=	(Greece) PAOK Thessaloniki						1	1			2
35	(Georgia (country)) (Soviet Union) Dinamo Tbilisi	1									1
=	(Bosnia and Herzegovina) (Socialist Federal Republic of Yugoslavia) Bosna	1									1
=	(Israel) Hapoel Jerusalem		1								1
=	(Russia) Dynamo Moscow		1								1
=	(Russia) Lokomotiv Kuban		1								1
=	(Turkey) Galatasaray		1								1
=	(Turkey) Darüşşafaka		1								1
=	(France) Monaco		1								1
=	(Spain) Gran Canaria		1								1
=	(France) Paris		1								1
=	(Israel) Hapoel Tel Aviv		1								1
=	(France) JL Bourg Basket		1								1
=	(Germany) Baskets Bonn			1							1
=	(Germany) Skyliners Frankfurt				1						1
=	(Italy) Reyer Venezia				1						1
=	(Italy) Dinamo Sassari				1						1
=	(Israel) Ironi Nes Ziona				1						1
=	(Turkey) Bahçeşehir Koleji				1						1
=	(Poland) Włocławek				1						1
=	(Germany) Niners Chemnitz				1						1
=	(Czech Republic) (Czechoslovakia) USK Praha						1				1
=	(Italy) Partenope Napoli						1				1
=	(Serbia) (Socialist Federal Republic of Yugoslavia) Crvena zvezda						1				1
=	(Italy) Victoria Libertas						1				1
=	(Slovenia) Olimpija Ljubljana						1				1
=	(Spain) Baskonia						1				1
=	(Greece) Maroussi						1				1
=	(Italy) Mens Sana						1				1
=	(Italy) AMG Sebastiani							1			1
=	(France) Élan Béarnais							1			1
=	(Germany) Alba Berlin							1			1
=	(Italy) Scaligera Verona							1			1
=	(France) SLUC Nancy							1			1
=	(Russia) Dynamo Saint Petersburg								1		1
=	(Spain) Sant Josep								1		1
=	(Latvia) Barons								1		1
=	(Germany) Göttingen								1		1
=	(Slovenia) Krka								1		1
=	(Turkey) Beşiktaş								1		1
=	(Russia) Krasnye Krylia								1		1
=	(Italy) Reggiana								1		1
=	(Ukraine) Mariupol									1	1
=	(Cyprus) AEL Limassol									1	1
=	(Germany) Mitteldeutscher									1	1
=	(Romania) CSU Ploiești									1	1
=	(Russia) Ural Great Perm									1	1
=	(Russia) Samara									1	1

=== By country ===
The following table lists all the countries whose clubs have won at least one European major competition, and is updated as of 25 May 2026 (in chronological order).

Key

FEL	Euroleague
FEB	EuroCup Basketball
FCC	Champions League
FEC	FIBA Europe Cup
FSC	FIBA Saporta Cup (defunct)
FKC	FIBA Korać Cup (defunct)
ECC	FIBA EuroChallenge (defunct)
FECC	FIBA EuroCup Challenge (defunct)

Most in category

List of European majors club competition winners by country
Rk.	Nation	FEL	FEB	FCC	FEC	FSC	FKC	ECC	FECC	Total
1	Spain	14	8	6	2	7	6	2		45
2.	Italy	13	1	1	2	15	10	2		44
3.	Greece	11		1		5	2		1	20
4.	Yugoslavia	7				3	6			16
5.	Russia	4	5					3	2	14
6.	France	1	3		1	1	5	1		12
7.	Soviet Union	8				2				10
8.	Israel	6	2		1					9
=	Turkey	4	2		1		1	1		9
10.	Germany			1	2		1	1	1	6
11.	Lithuania	1	2	1		1				5
12.	Slovenia					1		1		2
13.	Poland				1					1
=	Czechoslovakia					1				1
=	Latvia							1		1
=	Ukraine								1	1
=	Cyprus								1	1
=	Romania								1	1

== See also ==
- FIBA Europe
- FIBA
