= Tatjana Živanović =

Serbian basketball player

No. 77 – Kraljevo
- Position: Power forward / center
- League: First League of Serbia; Adriatic League

Personal information
- Born: 6 August 1990 (age 36) Kraljevo, SFR Yugoslavia
- Listed height: 1.90 m (6 ft 3 in)
- Listed weight: 72 kg (159 lb)

Career information
- WNBA draft: 2011: undrafted
- Playing career: 2005–present

Career history
- 2005–2009: Kraljevo
- 2009–2010: Kovin
- 2010–2013: Voždovac
- 2013: Vrbas Medela
- 2013–2014: Šumadija Kragujevac
- 2015: Kraljevo
- 2016: Grupo EM Leganés
- 2016: ADBA Avilés
- 2016–2017: Kraljevo
- 2017: AEL Limassol
- 2017–present: Kraljevo
Medals
Women's basketball
Representing Serbia
Mediterranean Games
| Silver medal – second place | 2009 Pescara | Team |
European U18 Championship
| Gold medal – first place | 2007 Serbia | Team |

Tatjana Živanović (Serbian Cyrillic: Татјана Живановић, born 6 August 1990 in Kraljevo, SFR Yugoslavia) is a Serbian women's basketball player.

== Personal life ==
In September 2017, she got engaged to her boyfriend at training of Kraljevo.
