= ŽKK Art Basket =

Basketball club in Novi Sad, Serbia

Art Basket
- Leagues: First League of Serbia
- Founded: 2009; 16 years ago
- History: ŽKK Art Basket; 2009–present
- Arena: Mega Factory Hall
- Capacity: 700
- Location: Belgrade, Serbia
- Team colors: Pink
- President: Ana Mrkić
- Head coach: Milan Vidosavljević
- Championships: 1 National Cup
- Website: zkkartbasket.com

Ženski košarkaški klub Art Basket (Serbian Cyrillic: Женски кошаркашки клуб Арт Баскет), commonly referred to as ŽKK Art Basket, is a women's professional basketball club based in Belgrade, Serbia.

== History ==
The club was founded in 2009 in Belgrade at the Vladislav Ribnikar Elementary School by Ana Mrkić, a basketball coach and former player from Šabac. She started Art Basket as a youth system academy with the desire to be a farm team for Crvena zvezda. After years of working with girls, the club formed a senior basketball team in 2017. At that point a cooperation with men's club Mega Basket was established.

In March 2021, the club won its first title, the National Cup.

== Head coaches ==
- (Serbia) Milan Vidosavljević (2019–present)

== Trophies and awards ==
=== Trophies ===
- First League of Serbia
  - Runners-up (1) : 2020–21
- Serbian Cup
  - Winner (2): 2021, 2024
  - Runners-up (1) : 2022, 2023

== Season by season ==
Season	Tier	Division	Pos.	Postseason	W–L	National Cup
2018–19	3	First Regional League, North 2	1	—	10–0	DNQ
2019–20	2	WLS Second League	1	—	16–0	DNQ
2020–21	1	WLS First League	4	Runners-up	20–8	Winners
2021–22	1	WLS First League	2	Semifinal	19–3	Runners-up
2022–23	1	WLS First League	3	Semifinal	17–5	Runners-up

Source: Srbijasport

== See also ==
- List of basketball clubs in Serbia by major honours won
