= Filip Sunturlić =

Serbian basketball player and executive

Personal information
- Born: April 14, 1982 (age 44) Belgrade, SR Serbia, SFR Yugoslavia
- Listed height: 1.97 m (6 ft 5 1/2 in)

Career information
- NBA draft: 2004: undrafted
- Playing career: 2000–2009
- Position: Guard
- Number: 10

Career history
- Leotar
- Hercegovac
- Student Tuzla
- Rabotnički
- Petrochimi Bandar Imam
- 2006–2007: Spartak Subotica
- 2008–2009: AEK Larnaca
- 2009: Vitez

Filip Sunturlić (Serbian Cyrillic: Филип Сунтурлић; born April 14, 1982) is a Serbian marketing specialist, basketball executive and former professional basketball player. Most recently, he served as the general manager of KK Crvena zvezda of the Basketball League of Serbia and the Adriatic League.

== Playing career ==
Sunturlić spent the 2006–07 season with Spartak Subotica of the Basketball League of Serbia.

In Bosnia and Herzegovina, Sunturlić played for Leotar, Hercegovac, KK Student Tuzla and HKK Vitez. In Cyprus, he played for Petrolina AEK Larnaca during the 2008–09 season. Also, he played professional basketball for Rabotnički (Macedonia) and Petrochimi Bandar Imam (Iran).

== Basketball executive career ==
=== Crvena zvezda (2011–2021) ===
Sunturlić have been serving as a marketing director for KK Crvena zvezda since September 2011. In July 2017, his marketing team was awarded with the Bronze Devotion Marketing Award from Euroleague Basketball. In March 2018, EuroLeague Basketball named him as a member of a working group for marketing and business development.

In July 2018, he was named as a general manager for Crvena zvezda, succeeding Davor Ristović on that position. As the general manager of the Zvezda, Sunturlić won two Serbian League championships (2018–19, 2020–21), a National Cup tournament (2021), and two Adriatic League championships (2019, 2021). He ended his term on 31 December 2021.

== Personal life ==
Sunturlić earned his master's degree in sports marketing and management from the Ca' Foscari University of Venice in 2014.

In March 2008, he became an executive director for FTS Sport Media.

Sporting positions
Preceded by Davor Ristović	General manager of KK Crvena zvezda 2018–2021	Succeeded by Nemanja Vasiljević
