= 2022–23 Milan Ciga Vasojević Cup =

2023 Milan Ciga Vasojević Cup
- Season: 2022–23
- Duration: 19–20 March 2023
- Games played: 3
- Teams: 4
- TV partner(s): Arena Sport

Finals
- Champions: Crvena zvezda mts
- Runners-up: Art Basket

The 2023 Milan Ciga Vasojević Cup is the 17th season of the Serbian women's national basketball cup tournament.

The tournament was held in Niš from 19 to 20 March 2023. Crvena zvezda mts won the tournament.

== Qualified teams ==
Cup of Serbia (2nd-tier)
Kraljevo
Crvena zvezda mts
Partizan 1953
Art Basket

== Venue ==
| Niš | 2022–23 Milan Ciga Vasojević Cup (Serbia) |
| Čair Sports Center | 2022–23 Milan Ciga Vasojević Cup (Serbia) |
| Capacity: 4,800 | 2022–23 Milan Ciga Vasojević Cup (Serbia) |

== Bracket ==
Semifinals
19 March
Art Basket | 92
Partizan 1953 | 76
19 March
Crvena zvezda mts | 64
Kraljevo | 57

Final
20 March
Art Basket | 55
Crvena zvezda mts | 77

== Semifinals ==
19 March 2023
17:30

Report

| Art Basket | 92–76 | Partizan 1953 |
Scoring by quarter: 17:17, 19:18, 32:17, 24:24
| Pts: Samardžić 16; Rebs: Vućković 16; Asts: Tripković 6 | | Pts: Knežević 21; Rebs: Davinić, Knežević 9 Asts: Davinić 4 |

Čair Sports Center, Niš
Attendance: 324
Referees: Ivanović, Ćirić, Nikolić

19 March 2023
20:00

Report

| Crvena zvezda mts | 64–57 | Kraljevo |
Scoring by quarter: 20:11, 18:16, 14:16, 12:14
| Pts: Jakovina 18; Rebs: Katanić 11; Asts: Katanić, Bojović 3 | | Pts: Gobeljić 19; Rebs: Gobeljić 13; Asts: Gobeljić 4 |

Čair Sports Center, Niš
Attendance: 300
Referees: Smiljanić, Jovičin, Stamenković

== Final ==
20 March 2023
20:00

Report

| Art Basket | 55–77 | Crvena zvezda mts |
| Pts: Avlijaš 18; Rebs: Mitrović 8 Asts: Avlijaš 6 | | Pts: Hall, Bojović 17; Rebs: Bojović 8 Asts: Katanić 5 |

Čair Sports Center, Niš
Attendance: 300
Referees: Smiljanić, Ivanović, Jovičin

== See also ==
- 2022–23 First Women's Basketball League of Serbia
- 2022–23 Radivoj Korać Cup
