= Dejan Kovačević (Serbian Progressive Party politician) =

Serbian politician

Dejan Kovačević (Serbian Cyrillic: Дејан Ковачевић; born 6 June 1979) is a politician in Serbia. He was a member of the National Assembly of Serbia from 2014 to 2016 and has served as mayor of Gornji Milanovac since 2016. Kovačević is a member of the Serbian Progressive Party (Srpska napredna stranka, SNS).

== Early life and career ==
Kovačević was born in Gornji Milanovac, in what was then the Socialist Republic of Serbia in the Socialist Federal Republic of Yugoslavia. A graduated engineer of industrial management, he has worked in the private sector and has been a branch manager and the Kragujevac director for DDOR a.d.o. Novi Sad.

== Politician ==
Kovačević has been a member of the Progressive Party since its founding. He led the party's electoral list for the Gornji Milanovac municipal assembly in the 2012 local elections and was elected when the list won nine mandates. The Socialist Party of Serbia (Socijalistička partija Srbije, SPS) won the election, and Kovačević led the SNS's assembly group in the term that followed. He also appeared in the 161st position on the SNS's list in the 2012 Serbian parliamentary election and was not elected when the list won seventy-three mandates.

=== Parliamentarian ===
Kovačević was promoted to the 122nd position on the SNS's list for the 2014 parliamentary election and was elected when the list won a landslide victory with 158 out of 250 mandates. He served for the next two years as a government supporter. In parliament, he was a deputy member of the committee on defence and internal affairs and the committee on economy, regional development, trade, tourism, and energy, as well as a being a member of parliamentary friendship groups with China, Germany, Italy, and Russia.

Kovačević was also a substitute member of Serbia's delegation to the Parliamentary Assembly of the Council of Europe (PACE) from 2014 to 2016. He served with the parliamentary group of the European People's Party and was a substitute member of the committee on social affairs, health, and sustainable development.

He was not a candidate in the 2016 parliamentary election.

=== Mayor of Gornji Milanovac ===
Kovačević led the SNS's list to a near-majority victory with twenty-four out of forty-nine seats in Gornji Milanovac in the 2016 local elections . He was chosen as mayor when the assembly convened, ending twelve years of SPS rule in the municipality.

In the 2020 local elections, he led the SNS to a majority victory with twenty-seven seats. He was confirmed afterward for another term as mayor, this time in coalition with the SPS.
