= ŽKK Loznica =

Women's basketball club in Loznica, Serbia

Loznica
- Founded: 1973; 52 years ago (as the part of KK Loznica); 2001; 24 years ago
- History: KK Loznica (1973–2001); ŽKK Loznica (2001–present)
- Arena: Lagator Hall
- Location: Loznica
- Team colors: Green, yellow

Ženski košarkaški klub Loznica (Serbian Cyrillic: Женски кошаркашки клуб Лозица), commonly referred to as ŽKK Loznica, is a women's professional basketball club based in Loznica, Serbia. The club was founded in 1973. Before 2001, it was a part of the men's basketball club KK Loznica.

== History ==
In the season 2017/2018, ŽKK Loznica played in Serbian First Women's Basketball League.

== Home arenas ==
The team play domestic home matches in the Lagator Hall.

== Notable players ==
Note: Flags indicate national team eligibility at FIBA-sanctioned events. Players may hold other non-FIBA nationalities not displayed.

Criteria

To appear in this section a player must have either:

- Set a club record or won an individual award while at the club
- Played at least one official international match for their national team at any time
- Played at least one official NBA match at any time.

- (Serbia) Aleksandra Crvendakić
- (Serbia) Tina Krajišnik (Jovanović)

== See also ==
- KK Loznica
