= Milan Ciga Vasojević Cup =

- Official logo
- Sport: Basketball
- Founded: 2006
- No. of teams: 4
- Country: Serbia
- Continent: FIBA Europe (Europe)
- Most recent champions: Crvena zvezda (5th title)
- Most titles: Vršac; Crvena zvezda (5 titles)
- Broadcasters: RTS; SOS Channel; Arena Sport
- Website: kss.rs (in Serbian)

The Milan Ciga Vasojević Cup (Serbian Cyrillic: Куп Милан Цига Васојевић) is the women's national basketball cup of Serbia. It is run by the Basketball Federation of Serbia. Named in honor of Milan Ciga Vasojević, who as coach and director lead the national team of Yugoslavia during the greatest successes of women's basketball.

After the dissolution of Serbia and Montenegro in 2006, the competition was called the Serbian Cup. At the initiative of Hemofarm in 2008 the Cup bears its present name.

== Title holders ==
- 2006–07 Hemofarm
- 2007–08 Hemofarm (2)
- 2008–09 Hemofarm (3)
- 2009–10 Hemofarm (4)
- 2010–11 Partizan
- 2011–12 Hemofarm (5)
- 2012–13 Partizan (2)
- 2013–14 Radivoj Korać
- 2014–15 Vojvodina
- 2015–16 Crvena zvezda
- 2016–17 Crvena zvezda (2)
- 2017–18 Partizan 1953 (3)
- 2018–19 Crvena zvezda (3)
- 2019–20 Kraljevo
- 2020–21 Art Basket
- 2021–22 Crvena zvezda mts (4)
- 2022–23 Crvena zvezda mts (5)

== The finals ==
| Season | City host | Winner | Result | Runner-up | Winner's Coach | Ref. |
|---|---|---|---|---|---|---|
| 2006–07 | Novi Sad/Bačka Palanka | Hemofarm | 76–64 | Vojvodina | (Serbia) Jovica Antonić | |
| 2007–08 | Subotica | Hemofarm | 74–67 | Crvena zvezda | (Serbia) Marina Maljković | |
| 2008–09 | Vršac | Hemofarm | 79–66 | Crvena zvezda | (Serbia) Marina Maljković | |
| 2009–10 | Belgrade | Hemofarm | 76–69 | Partizan | (Serbia) Miroslav Popov | |
| 2010–11 | Beočin and Ruma | Partizan | 83–69 | Hemofarm | (Serbia) Marina Maljković | |
| 2011–12 | Smederevo | Hemofarm | 67–53 | Radivoj Korać | (Serbia) Miroslav Popov | |
| 2012–13 | Lazarevac | Partizan | 103–71 | Radivoj Korać | (Serbia) Marina Maljković | |
| 2013–14 | Lazarevac | Radivoj Korać | 90–64 | Partizan | (Serbia) Miloš Pavlović | |
| 2014–15 | Zrenjanin | Vojvodina | 79–71 | Radivoj Korać | (Serbia) Milan Dabović | |
| 2015–16 | Vrbas | Crvena zvezda | 71–66 | Vrbas Medela | (Serbia) Dragan Vuković | |
| 2016–17 | Novi Sad | Crvena zvezda | 84–66 | Radivoj Korać | (Serbia) Dragan Vuković | |
| 2017–18 | Banja Koviljača | Partizan 1953 | 68–61 | Crvena zvezda | (Serbia) Blagoje Ivić | |
| 2018–19 | Loznica | Crvena zvezda | 56–55 | Radivoj Korać | (Serbia) Dragan Vuković | |
| 2019–20 | Surdulica | Kraljevo | 76–73 | Radivoj Korać | (Serbia) Dejan Kovačević | |
| 2020–21 | Vršac | Art Basket | 83–74 | Vojvodina 021 | (Serbia) Milan Vidosavljević | |
| 2021–22 | Niš | Crvena zvezda mts | 90–71 | Art Basket | (Serbia) Dragan Vuković | |
| 2022–23 | Niš | Crvena zvezda mts | 77–55 | Art Basket | (Serbia) Dragan Vuković | |

== Performance by club ==
Including titles in SFR Yugoslavia, FR Yugoslavia, Serbia and Montenegro and Serbia

| Team | Winners | Runners-up | Years Won | Years Runner-up |
|---|---|---|---|---|
| Crvena zvezda | 15 | 12 | 1973, 1974, 1976, 1979, 1981, 1992, 1994, 1995, 2003, 2004, 2016, 2017, 2019, 2022, 2023 | 1975, 1977, 1980, 1984, 1989, 1990, 1991, 1993, 2001, 2008, 2009, 2018 |
| Vršac | 11 | 2 | 1996, 1998, 1999, 2002, 2005, 2006, 2007, 2008, 2009, 2010, 2012 | 2004, 2011 |
| Partizan | 5 | 6 | 1985, 1986, 2011, 2013, 2018 | 1978, 1983, 1996, 2000, 2010, 2014 |
| Vojvodina | 2 | 7 | 2001, 2015 | 1972, 1995, 1998, 1999, 2005, 2006, 2007 |
| Voždovac | 2 | 1 | 1972, 1984 | 1974 |
| Radnički Beograd | 2 | – | 1960, 1962 | – |
| Radivoj Korać | 1 | 6 | 2014 | 2012, 2013, 2015, 2017, 2019, 2020 |
| Art Basket | 1 | 2 | 2021 | 2022, 2023 |
| Student Niš | 1 | 1 | 1993 | 1994 |
| Dinamo Pančevo | 1 | – | 1997 | – |
| Kovin | 1 | – | 2000 | – |
| Kraljevo | 1 | – | 2020 | – |
| Bačka Palanka | – | 1 | – | 1997 |
| Vrbas Medela | – | 1 | – | 2016 |
| Vojvodina 021 | – | 1 | – | 2021 |

== See also ==
- First Women's Basketball League of Serbia
