= Dejan Kovačević (basketball) =

Bosnian-German basketball player

Free Agent
- Position: Power forward / center

Personal information
- Born: December 27, 1996 (age 29) Munich, Germany
- Listed height: 6 ft 10 in (2.08 m)
- Listed weight: 218 lb (99 kg)

Career information
- Playing career: 2015–present

Career history
- 2015–2017: Bayern Munich
- 2017–2018: s.Oliver Würzburg
- 2018–2019: Löwen Braunschweig
- 2019–2022: Crailsheim Merlins
- 2022–2024: Bayer Giants Leverkusen
- 2024–2025: Medi Bayreuth

Dejan Kovačević (born December 27, 1996) is a Bosnian-German professional basketball player who last played for Medi Bayreuth of the German ProA. He previously played for Bayern Munich.

== Professional career ==
Following the 2016–17 campaign, Kovačević signed with s.Oliver Würzburg of the German Basketball Bundesliga.

On May 25, 2024, he signed with Medi Bayreuth of the German ProA.
