= Lagator Hall =

Indoor arena in Loznica, Serbia

- Interactive map of Lagator Hall
- Full name: Lagator Sports Centre
- Location: Loznica, Serbia
- Coordinates: 44.5403°N 19.2321°E
- Owner: City of Loznica
- Operator: Loznica
- Capacity: 2,236

Construction
- Groundbreaking: 1979
- Opened: 23 September 1984; 42 years ago

Tenant
- KK Loznica (1984–present)

Lagator Hall (Serbian: Hala Lagator, Serbian Cyrillic: Хала Лагатор) is an indoor arena in Loznica. It has a capacity of 2,236 people. It was finished in 1984. It is the home arena of KK Loznica.

== Location ==
The indoor arena is located in "Lagator" urban neighborhood, hence the name. With Lagator Stadium and other sports venues located in close proximity, it comprises the main sports center of Loznica.

== See also ==
- List of indoor arenas in Serbia
