= Mina Đorđević =

Serbian basketball player

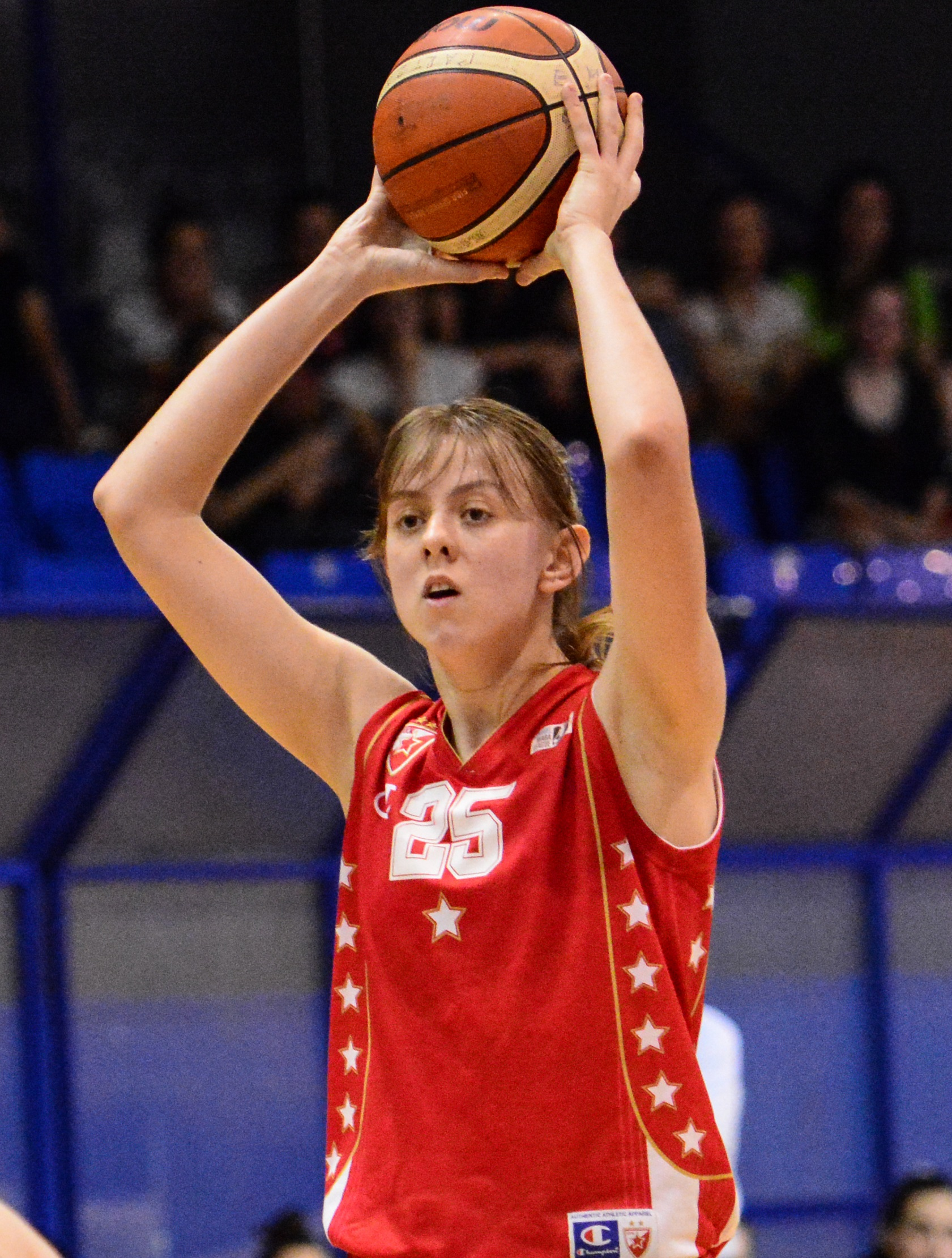

No. 25 – Crvena zvezda
- Position: Power forward
- League: First Women's Basketball League of Serbia

Personal information
- Born: 23 February 1999 (age 27) Aleksinac, Serbia, FR Yugoslavia
- Listed height: 1.86 m (6 ft 1 in)

Career history
- —2019: Crvena zvezda
- 2019—2022: Budućnost Podgorica
- 2022—2023: Fenerbahçe
- 2023: Hapoel Rishon Le-Zion
- 2023—2024: Emlak Konut
- 2024—2025: Rutronik Stars Keltern
- 2025—present: Crvena zvezda

Career highlights
- 1× 1. Damen-Basketball-Bundesliga (2025)

Mina Đorđević (Serbian Cyrillic: Мина Ђорђевић; born 23 February 1999) is a Serbian basketball player. She represented Serbia at the 2024 Summer Olympics.
