= Kraljevo Sports Hall =

Indoor arena in Kraljevo, Serbia

- Хала спортова у Краљеву
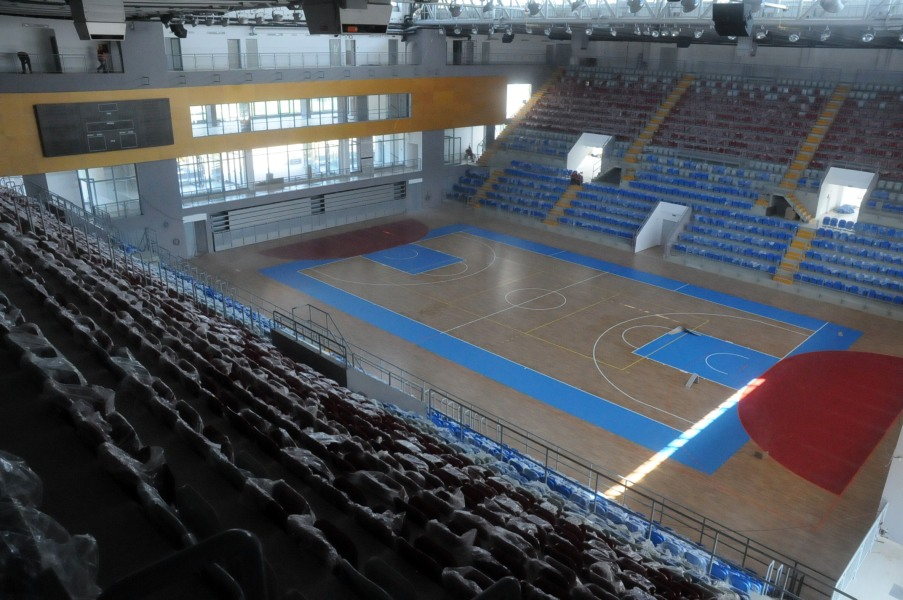
- Sports Hall Interior in July 2013
- Interactive map of Kraljevo Sports Hall
- Location: Kraljevo, Serbia
- Coordinates: 43.715122°N 20.693883°E
- Capacity: 3,000–6,000
- Type: sports hall

Construction
- Opened: 2 November 2015; 10 years ago

Tenants
- KK Sloga (2015–present); OK Ribnica (2015–present)

Kraljevo Sports Hall (Serbian: Хала спортова у Краљеву, romanized: Hala sportova u Kraljevu) is a multi-use indoor arena in Kraljevo, Serbia. The arena has a total capacity of 6,000. It is used mostly for team handball and basketball matches since it is the home arena of basketball teams KK Sloga and KK Mašinac as well as volleyball team OK Ribnica.

The arena was officially opened on 11 February 2015.

In March 2015 Serbia played against Croatia for the Davis Cup first round, while the following year Serbia's Fed Cup team received Spain for the Fed Cup World Group II at this stadium.

== See also ==
- List of indoor arenas in Serbia
