= ŽKK Vojvodina 021 =

Basketball club in Novi Sad, Serbia

Vojvodina 021
- Leagues: First League of Serbia; Adriatic League Women
- Founded: 2 August 1999; 25 years ago
- History: ŽKK Beočin (1999–2018); ŽKK 021 (2018–2020); ŽKK Vojvodina 021 (2020–present)
- Arena: Petrovaradin Hall
- Capacity: 900
- Location: Beočin, Serbia (1999–2018); Novi Sad, Serbia (2018–present)
- Team colors: Red and White
- President: (Serbia) Aleksandar Jovanović
- Head coach: (Serbia) Aleksandar Jovanović

Ženski košarkaški klub Vojvodina 021 (Serbian Cyrillic: Женски кошаркашки клуб Војводина 021), commonly referred to as ŽKK Vojvodina 021, is a women's professional basketball club based in Novi Sad, Serbia. The club was founded in Beočin in 1999 as ŽKK Beočin, and was relocated to Novi Sad in 2018.

== History ==
Founded in 1999 as ŽKK Beočin based in Beočin, the club relocated to Novi Sad in 2018, changing its name to ŽKK 021. On 25 September 2020, the club changed its name to ŽKK Vojvodina 021, continuing the tradition of the former club ŽKK Vojvodina.

In March 2021, the club lost in the final of National Cup.

== Honours ==
=== Domestic ===
- First League of Serbia
  - Runners-up (1) : 2019
- Serbian Cup
  - Runner up (1): 2021

=== International ===
- Adriatic League
  - Third place (1): 2023
