= ŽKK Student Niš =

Serbian basketball club

- Leagues: Serbian League
- Founded: 1957; 68 years ago
- Arena: Dušan Radović School Hall (capacity: 1.000)
- Location: Niš, Serbia
- Team colors: Blue and Yellow
- Head coach: (Serbia) Zvonimir Stanković
- Championships: 1 National Cups

Univerzitetski ženski košarkaški klub Student (Serbian Cyrillic: Универзитетски женски кошаркашки клуб Студент, English: University Women's Basketball Club Student) is a women's professional basketball club based in Niš, Serbia. They are currently competing in the Women's Serbian League and Eurocup.

== Honours ==
- Milan Ciga Vasojević Cup:
  - Winners (1) : 1993
  - Runners-up (1) : 1994

== See also ==
- List of basketball clubs in Serbia by major honours won
