= ŽKK Vrbas =

Basketball club in Vrbas, Serbia

- Leagues: Serbian first league
- Founded: 1975
- Arena: CFK Drago Jovović (capacity: 2.500)
- Location: Vrbas, Serbia
- Team colors: Blue and White
- President: (Serbia) Ivica Lončar
- Head coach: (Serbia) Vesna Džuver

Ženski košarkaški klub Vrbas (Serbian Cyrillic: Женски кошаркашки клуб Врбас, English: Women's Basketball Club Vrbas) is a Serbian women's basketball team from Vrbas, Serbia. The club currently plays in Serbian first league.

== History ==
Vrbas was founded in 1975. He began working as a school section of the high school "Žarko Zrenjanin," which was led by Professor Zdravko Bjelica, to the same year became the club. The first coach was Peter Kankaraš. With more or less success, the club has been functioning for 40 years.

At the end of the 80s competed in the Yugoslav Second Federal League which then played in venues all over Yugoslavia. Since 2011 ŽKK Vrbas is a member of the Serbian first league, and their teams had players who were on the scene for team, Tijana Ajduković, Nataša Mijatović, Ivana Jovović, Tijana Cukić, Tamara Rajić, etc.

== Honours ==
National Cups – 0

- Milan Ciga Vasojević Cup:
  - Runners-up (1) : 2016

== Arena ==
Teodora Sarić

== Notable former players ==
- Tijana Ajduković
- Nataša Mijatović
- Ivana Jovović
- Tijana Cukić
- Tamara Rajić
- Nataša Bučevac
- Jovana Vukoje
- Tatjana Živanović
