= ŽKK Radivoj Korać =

Serbian basketball club

- Leagues: First League of Serbia
- Founded: 1972; 53 years ago
- Arena: CKS Šumice (2.000); Sport EKO Hall (1.000)
- Location: Belgrade, Serbia
- Team colors: Blue, Orange and White
- Head coach: (Serbia) Miloš Pavlović
- Championships: 3 National Championships; 1 National Cups; 1 Adriatic League
- Website: korac.rs

Ženski košarkaški klub Radivoj Korać (Serbian Cyrillic: Женски кошаркашки клуб Радивој Кораћ), commonly referred to as ŽKK Radivoj Korać, is a women's professional basketball club based in Belgrade, Serbia. They are currently competing in the First League of Serbia.

They have won three national championships, one national cup and one Adriatic League championships. They play their home games at the CKS Šumice and Sport EKO Hall.

== History ==
=== 20th century ===
ŽKK Radivoj Korać was established in 1972. as an amateur section of the men's club. At the beginning of the nineties Radivoj Korać junior team was the champion of FR Yugoslavia.

=== 2000s ===
Good results Club starts recorded since 2006. year. In the 2006–2007 season the club in the First B League won fifth place and the following season to qualify for the highest rank.

In his first season in the First League of Serbia is Radivoj Korać finished sixth place in the division. The following season Radivoj Korać finished in third place and qualified for the playoffs, where his opponent in the quarterfinals was a Crvena zvezda. Basketball player steps have triumphed 2–1 victory, and in the semifinals they waited defending champion Hemofarm. Girls from Vršac were better and triumphed 2–0 in victories.

=== 2010s ===
Thanks won third place last season, earned the right to compete in the 2010–2011 season in the Adriatic league where they finished sixth in no. In the Super League Serbia reiterated last year's success by winning third place and the semi-finals where they were better than Partizan were 2-0 victories. The following season he made a step forward in the Adriatic league by winning the fifth place, the first time they played and the final Milan Ciga Vasojević Cup where defeated by Hemofarm 67:53.

In the season 2012-13 the first time they played in the Final Four Adriatic league after they won second place in regular competitions. At the Final Four, the semifinals they beat Hungarian PEAC-Pécs 68:43, but in the final lost against Partizan 70:45. In the Milan Ciga Vasojević Cup in Lazarevac reiterated the success of last year, and the final was again better than them Partizan 103:71. As a participant in the Adriatic league are placed directly into the final play-off First League of Serbia where 2-0 victories were better than Radnički Kragujevac. The semifinals are revenged basketball players of Vojvodina, but for the third time this season, in the finals of a competition were worse than Partizan.

Season 2013-14 was the most successful in the club's history. At the Final Four Adriatic league in Podgorica in the final after three overtime beat the Crvena zvezda with 87:83 and won the first trophy in history. The second trophy was won two weeks later when the third consecutive cup final, triumphed over Partizan 90:64.

== Arena ==
=== CKS Šumice ===
CKS Šumice is a multi-purpose indoor arena located in the Voždovac municipality and it has a capacity of 2.000 seats.

=== Sport EKO Hall ===
Sport EKO Hall is a multi-purpose indoor arena located in the Voždovac municipality and it has a capacity of 1.000 seats.

== Honours ==
=== Domestic ===
National Championships – 3

- First League of Serbia:
  - Winners (3) : 2014, 2015, 2016
  - Runners-up (2) : 2013, 2017

National Cups – 1

- Cup of Serbia:
  - Winners (1) : 2014
  - Runners-up (4) : 2012, 2013, 2015, 2017

=== International ===
International titles – 1

- Adriatic League Women:
  - Winners (1) : 2014
  - Runners-up (2) : 2013, 2015

== Coaches ==
- Petar Marković (?)

== Notable players ==
- Ines Ajanović
- Ivana Grubor
- Nevena Jovanović
- Biljana Stanković
- Jelena Antić
- Nikolina Milić
- Maja Vučurović
- Marina Marković
- Mirjana Beronja
- Sanja Mandić
- Kristina Topuzović

== See also ==
- List of basketball clubs in Serbia by major honours won
