= 2013–14 First Women's Basketball League of Serbia =

- League: First League of Serbia
- Sport: Basketball
- Duration: 5 October 2013 – 10 May 2014
- Games: 191
- Teams: 14

2013–14
- Season champions: Radivoj Korać (1st title)
- Season MVP: (Serbia) Adrijana Knežević

Serbian First League seasons
- ← 2012–13 2014–15 →

The 2013–14 First Women's Basketball League of Serbia was the 8th season of the First Women's Basketball League of Serbia, the highest professional basketball league in Serbia. It was also 70th national championship played by Serbian clubs inclusive of nation's previous incarnations as Yugoslavia and Serbia and Montenegro.

The first half of the season consisted of 14 teams and 182-game regular season (26 games for each of the 14 teams). It began Saturday, October 5, 2013 and ended Tuesday, April 15, 2014. The second half of the season consisted of four teams that play a playoff.

The playoff included the top four teams from the First Women's Basketball League of Serbia and ran from 16 April 2014 to 10 May 2014. Radivoj Korać won the championship.

== Team information ==
Team	City	Arena	Capacity	Head coach
Crvena zvezda	Belgrade	Basket city Hall	1,600	Dragan Vuković
Jagodina 2001	Jagodina	JASSA Sports Center	2,600	Slavica Nikolić
Partizan	Belgrade	Belgrade Sport Palace	5,000	Milan Dabović
Radivoj Korać	Belgrade	Sport EKO Hall	1,000	Miloš Pavlović
Radnički Kragujevac	Kragujevac	Hall Gordana Goca Bogojević	600	Vesna Despotović
Spartak Subotica	Subotica	Sport Palace Subotica	3,500	Stojanka Došić
Srbobran	Srbobran	SC Srbobran	500	Slobodan Subić
Stara Pazova	Stara Pazova	Sport Palace Stara Pazova	300	Slađan Ivić
Student Niš	Niš	Dušan Radović School Hall	1,000	Zvonimir Stanković
Šabac	Šabac	Šabac High School Hall	500	Dejan Popović
Šumadija Kragujevac	Kragujevac	Hall Gordana Goca Bogojević	600	Darko Jakovljević
Vojvodina	Novi Sad	SPC Vojvodina	1,030	Aleksandar Jovanović
Vrbas	Vrbas	CFK Vrbas	2,500	Dejan Mudreša
Vršac	Vršac	Millennium Center	5,000	Bogdan Bulj

Teams from Adriatic League

== Regular season ==
The season was played with 14 teams and a dual circuit system, each with each one game at home and away. The four best teams at the end of the regular season were placed in the playoff. The regular season began 5 October 2013 and ended 15 April 2014.

Place	Team	Pld	W	L	PF	PA	Diff	Pts	
1.	Radivoj Korać	26	25	1	2018	1282	+736	51	Play Off
2.	Crvena zvezda	26	22	4	2096	1635	+461	48	Play Off
3.	Partizan	26	20	6	2147	1834	+313	46	Play Off
4.	Vrbas	26	20	6	1871	1656	+215	46	Play Off
5.	Vršac	26	18	8	1747	1629	+118	44	
6.	Srbobran	26	15	11	1806	1761	+45	41	
7.	Šumadija Kragujevac	26	13	13	1814	1730	+84	39	
8.	Radnički Kragujevac	26	11	15	1811	1834	-23	37	
9.	Šabac	26	11	15	1646	1790	-144	37	
10.	Vojvodina (-1)	26	10	16	1703	1883	-180	35	
11.	Spartak Subotica	26	8	18	1662	1887	-225	34	
12.	Student Niš	26	5	21	1544	1886	-342	31	
13.	Jagodina 2001	26	2	24	1763	2255	-492	28	
14.	Stara Pazova	26	2	24	1468	2034	-566	28	

Qualified for Play Off
Relegated to Second League

== Playoff ==
The playoff was according to the cup system. The semifinals was played on 2 wins, in the final at 3 wins. The playoffs lasted from 16 April 2014 to 10 May 2014.

Semifinals
1	Radivoj Korać	2
4	Vrbas	1
2	Crvena zvezda	2
3	Partizan	0

Final
1	Radivoj Korać	3
2	Crvena zvezda	1

== Awards ==
- Finals MVP: Aleksandra Crvendakić (188-F-96) of Crvena zvezda
- Player of the Year: Adrijana Knežević (183-F-87) of Spartak Subotica
- Point Guard of the Year: Jovana Popović (173-PG-90) of Partizan
- Power Forward of the Year: Adrijana Knežević (183-F-87) of Spartak Subotica
- Center of the Year: Emina Demirović (186-C-85) of Vrbas
- Coach of the Year: Miloš Pavlović of Radivoj Korać

1st Team

- PG: Jovana Popović (173-PG-90) of Partizan
- G: Biljana Stanković (177-G-74) of Radivoj Korać
- F: Adrijana Knežević (183-F-87) of Spartak Subotica
- F: Jelena Mitić (188-F-89) of Jagodina 2001
- C: Emina Demirović (186-C-85) of Vrbas

2nd Team

- G: Jovana Pašić (178-G-92) of Partizan
- G: Aleksandra Katić (172-G-87) of Radnički Kragujevac
- F: Aleksandra Crvendakić (188-F-96) of Crvena zvezda
- C/F: Ivanka Matić (193-C/F-79) of Crvena zvezda
- C: Nikolina Milić (191-C-94) of Radivoj Korać

3rd Team

- G: Dunja Prčić (180-G-87) of Partizan
- F/G: Jovana Jakšić (178-F/G-92) of Vršac
- F/C: Tina Jovanović (190-F/C-91) of Crvena zvezda
- F/C: Ivana Grubor (185-F/C-84) of Jagodina 2001
- C: Jelena Maksimović (192-C-82) of Radivoj Korać

Honorable Mention

- Dara Kovačević (197-C-83) of Srbobran
- Jelena Antić (187-SF-91) of Radivoj Korać
- Aleksandra Dobrović (184-C-93) of Vršac
- Aleksandra Račić (181-G-90) of Šumadija Kragujevac
- Mirjana Velisavljević (188-C-78) of Šabac
- Emeše Vida (188-F/C-93) of Spartak Subotica
- Sonja Marić (185-F-85) of Srbobran
- Bojana Janković (184-F-83) of Partizan
