= 2012–13 First Women's Basketball League of Serbia =

- League: First League of Serbia
- Sport: Basketball
- Duration: 6 October 2012 – 6 April 2013
- Games: 125
- Teams: 16

2012–13
- Season champions: Partizan Galenika (7th title)
- Season MVP: (Serbia) Tamara Radočaj

Serbian First League seasons
- ← 2011–12 2013–14 →

The 2012–13 First Women's Basketball League of Serbia is the 7th season of the First Women's Basketball League of Serbia, the highest professional basketball league in Serbia. It is also 69th national championship played by Serbian clubs inclusive of nation's previous incarnations as Yugoslavia and Serbia & Montenegro.

The first half of the season consists of 11 teams and 110-game regular season (20 games for each of the 11 teams) began on 6 October 2012 and will end on 17 February 2013. The second part of the season consists of two parts, the Play Off and Play Out.

In the Play Off playing eight teams, 5 from Adriatic League and 3 from First Women's Basketball League of Serbia. In the Play Out playing six teams it turns out that the last team. After the regular season it turns the bottom team and one team in Play Out. Play Off is played from 10. March 2013. to 6. April 2013, Play Out is played from 5. - 30. March 2013. Champion for this season is Partizan.

== Team information ==
Team	City	Arena	Capacity
Beočin	Beočin	SPC Beočin	1,000
Crvena zvezda	Belgrade	Basket city Hall	1,600
Jagodina 2001	Jagodina	JASSA Sports Center	2,600
Partizan Galenika	Belgrade	Belgrade Sport Palace	5,000
Radivoj Korać	Belgrade	Sport EKO Hall	1,000
Radnički Kragujevac	Kragujevac	Hall Gordana Goca Bogojević	600
Srbobran	Srbobran	SC Srbobran	500
Stara Pazova	Stara Pazova	Sport Palace Stara Pazova	300
Student Niš	Niš	Dušan Radović School Hall	1,000
Šabac	Šabac	Šabac High School Hall	500
Šumadija Kragujevac	Kragujevac	Hall Gordana Goca Bogojević	600
Čelarevo	Čelarevo	SD Čelarevo	400
Vojvodina	Novi Sad	SPC Vojvodina	1,030
Vrbas	Vrbas	CFK Vrbas	2,500
Vršac	Vršac	Millennium Center	5,000
Voždovac	Belgrade	SC Šumice	2,000

Teams from Adriatic League

== Regular season ==
The League of the season was played with 11 teams and play a dual circuit system, each with each one game at home and away. The four best teams at the end of the regular season were placed in the Play Off. The regular season began on 6 October 2012 and it will end on 17 February 2013.

Place	Team	Pld	W	L	PF	PA	Diff	Pts	
1.	Crvena zvezda	20	19	1	1666	1264	+402	39	Play Off
2.	Jagodina 2001	20	15	5	1544	1395	+149	35	Play Off
3.	Radnički Kragujevac	20	13	7	1239	1207	+32	33	Play Off
4.	Šabac	20	11	9	1245	1255	-10	31	Play Off
5.	Srbobran	20	10	10	1317	1324	-7	30	Play Out
6.	Šumadija Kragujevac	20	10	10	1415	1312	+103	30	Play Out
7.	Vrbas	20	10	10	1376	1416	-40	30	Play Out
8.	Student Niš	20	9	11	1233	1299	-66	29	Play Out
9.	Stara Pazova	20	9	11	1277	1302	-25	29	Play Out
10.	Beočin	20	4	16	1206	1395	-189	24	Play Out
11.	Čelarevo	20	0	20	1200	1549	-349	20	Relegation

Qualified for Play Off
Played in Play Out
Relegated to Second League

== Play Off ==
Play Off is played according to the cup system. Champion is received after the final was played. The final was played on 3 wins, while in other parts the Play Off at 2 victory. Play Off is played from 10. March 2013. to 6. April 2013.

Quarter Finals
Partizan Galenika	2
Šabac	0
Vršac	0
Crvena zvezda	2
Radivoj Korać	2
Radnički Kragujevac	0
Vojvodina	2
Jagodina 2001	0

Semifinals
Partizan Galenika	2
Crvena zvezda	0
Radivoj Korać	2
Vojvodina	0

Finals
Partizan Galenika	3
Radivoj Korać	0

== Play Out ==
In play out all the clubs play against each other, and the worst ranked team in play out is relegation of the league. Play Out is played from 5. - 30. March 2013.

Place	Team	Pld	W	L	PF	PA	Diff	Pts
9.	Šumadija Kragujevac	15	11	4	1047	908	+139	26
10.	Vrbas	15	9	6	1029	1021	+8	24
11.	Stara Pazova	15	9	6	1008	973	+35	24
12.	Srbobran	15	9	6	959	950	+9	24
13.	Student Niš	15	7	8	909	920	-11	22
14.	Beočin	15	0	15	794	974	-180	15

Relegated to Second League

== Awards ==
- Player of the Year: Tamara Radočaj (170-PG-87) of Partizan Galenika
- Point Guard of the Year: Tamara Radočaj (170-PG-87) of Partizan Galenika
- Shooting Guard of the Year: Jovana Popović (173-PG-90) of Vojvodina
- Small Forward of the Year: Nataša Bučevac (179-G-85) of Vojvodina
- Power Forward of the Year: Brooke Queenan (188-F-84) of Partizan Galenika
- Center of the Year: Nikolina Milić (195-C-94) of Radnički Kragujevac
- Coach of the Year: Marina Maljković of Partizan Galenika

1st Team

- PG: Tamara Radočaj (170-PG-87) of Partizan Galenika
- G: Jovana Popović (173-PG-90) of Vojvodina
- F: Nataša Bučevac (179-G-85) of Vojvodina
- PF: Brooke Queenan (188-F-84) of Partizan Galenika
- C: Nikolina Milić (195-C-94) of Radnički Kragujevac

2nd Team

- G: Snežana Čolić (178-G-92) of Radivoj Korać
- G: Milica Dabović (175-PG-82) of Partizan Galenika
- G: Nevena Jovanović (178-G-90) of Partizan Galenika
- F/C: Ivana Grubor (185-F/C-84) of Jagodina 2001
- F/C: Tina Jovanović (190-F/C-91) of Radivoj Korać

Honorable Mention

- Aleksandra Stanaćev (167-PG-94) of Crvena zvezda
- Katarina Vučković (191-F/C-94) of Crvena zvezda
- Ivana Jovović (185-F-89) of Vrbas
- Jovana Vidaković (171-PG-94) of Šabac
- Jelena Prvulović (175-G-91) of Radnički Kragujevac
- Marina Marković (181-G/F-91) of Šumadija Kragujevac
- Bojana Janković (184-F-83) of Vršac
- Dijana Stančić (182-G/F-93) of Stara Pazova
- Marija Ilić (190-C-85) of Student Niš
- Ivana Grubor (185-F/C-84) of Jagodina 2001
- Sandra Bošković (171-F-91) of Vojvodina
- Milena Radošević (173-G/F-87) of Srbobran
- Marija Radošević of Čelarevo
