= 2014–15 First Women's Basketball League of Serbia =

- League: First League of Serbia
- Sport: Basketball
- Duration: 11 October 2014 – 15 April 2015
- Games: 140
- Teams: 12
- Total attendance: 1716 (in Play Off)

2014–15
- Season champions: Radivoj Korać (2nd title)
- Season MVP: (Montenegro) Jelena Vučetić

Serbian First League seasons
- ← 2013–14 2015–16 →

The 2014–15 First Women's Basketball League of Serbia is the 9th season of the First Women's Basketball League of Serbia, the highest professional basketball league in Serbia. It is also 71st national championship played by Serbian clubs inclusive of nation's previous incarnations as Yugoslavia and Serbia & Montenegro.

The first half of the season consists of 12 teams and 132-game regular season (22 games for each of the 12 teams).

== Team information ==
Team	City	Arena	Capacity
Bor	Bor	SC Bor	4,000
Crvena zvezda	Belgrade	Basket city Hall	1,600
Partizan	Belgrade	Belgrade Sport Palace	5,000
Radivoj Korać	Belgrade	Sport EKO Hall	1,000
Radnički Kragujevac	Kragujevac	Hall Gordana Goca Bogojević	600
Spartak Subotica	Subotica	Sport Palace Subotica	3,500
Srbobran	Srbobran	SC Srbobran	500
Šabac	Šabac	Šabac High School Hall	500
Šumadija Kragujevac	Kragujevac	Hall Gordana Goca Bogojević	600
Vojvodina	Novi Sad	SPC Vojvodina	1,030
Vrbas	Vrbas	CFK Vrbas	2,500
Vršac	Vršac	Millennium Center	5,000

Teams from Adriatic League

== Regular season ==
The League of the season was played with 14 teams and play a dual circuit system, each with each one game at home and away. The four best teams at the end of the regular season were placed in the Play Off. The regular season began on 11 October 2014 and it will end on 2 March 2015.

Place	Team	Pld	W	L	PF	PA	Diff	Pts	
1.	Radivoj Korać	22	22	0	1726	1214	+512	44	Play Off
2.	Partizan	22	17	5	1583	1375	+208	39	Play Off
3.	Vojvodina (-1)	22	16	6	1788	1607	+181	37	Play Off
4.	Šumadija Kragujevac	22	14	8	1559	1454	+105	36	Play Off
5.	Vrbas	22	13	9	1436	1397	+39	35	
6.	Vršac Swisslion	22	10	12	1427	1516	-89	32	
7.	Crvena zvezda	22	10	12	1512	1504	+8	32	
8.	Radnički Kragujevac	22	9	13	1477	1529	-52	31	
9.	Spartak Subotica	22	7	15	1297	1570	-273	29	
10.	Bor	22	7	15	1314	1507	-193	29	Relegation
11.	Šabac	22	7	15	1485	1472	+13	29	Relegation
12.	Srbobran (-1)	22	0	22	1322	1781	-459	21	Relegation

Qualified for Play Off
Relegated to Second League

1. round
(11.10.)	Vršac – Srbobran	80:75
(11.10.)	Crvena zvezda – Spartak	89:40
(12.10.)	Vojvodina – Radnički	70:67
(11.10.)	Šumadija – Bor	82:49
(12.10.)	Radivoj Korać – Partizan	73:57
(11.10.)	Vrbas – Šabac	67:66

2. round
(18.10.)	Srbobran – Šabac	53:80
(19.10.)	Partizan – Vrbas	64:68
(19.10.)	Bor – Radivoj Korać	55:76
(17.10.)	Radnički – Šumadija	59:64
(18.10.)	Spartak – Vojvodina	64:110
(18.10.)	Vršac – Crvena zvezda	78:56

3. round
(25.10.)	Crvena zvezda – Srbobran	73:58
(26.10.)	Vojvodina – Vršac	106:87
(25.10.)	Šumadija – Spartak	91:38
(24.10.)	Radivoj Korać – Radnički	83:54
(25.10.)	Vrbas – Bor	63:53
(25.10.)	Šabac – Partizan	82:85

4. round
(1.11.)	Srbobran – Partizan	74:90
(1.11.)	Bor – Šabac	56:48
(1.11.)	Radnički – Vrbas	76:73
(1.11.)	Spartak – Radivoj Korać	48:73
(1.11.)	Vršac – Šumadija	75:53
(1.11.)	Crvena zvezda – Vojvodina	76:80

5. round
(9.11.)	Vojvodina – Srbobran	108:85
(8.11.)	Šumadija – Crvena zvezda	83:62
(9.11.)	Radivoj Korać – Vršac	59:43
(8.11.)	Vrbas – Spartak	83:56
(9.11.)	Šabac – Radnički	63:76
(8.11.)	Partizan – Bor	55:41

6. round
(15.11.)	Srbobran – Bor	66:70
(15.11.)	Radnički – Partizan	66:80
(15.11.)	Spartak – Šabac	63:60
(14.11.)	Vršac – Vrbas	53:65
(15.11.)	Crvena zvezda – Radivoj Korać	55:69
(14.11.)	Vojvodina – Šumadija	88:62

7. round
(22.11.)	Šumadija – Srbobran	71:53
(22.11.)	Radivoj Korać – Vojvodina	103:74
(21.11.)	Vrbas – Crvena zvezda	76:65
(23.11.)	Šabac – Vršac	71:55
(22.11.)	Partizan – Spartak	81:64
(22.11.)	Bor – Radnički	80:70

8. round
(29.11.)	Srbobran – Radnički	75:85
(3.12.)	Spartak – Bor	70:68
(29.11.)	Vršac – Partizan	50:73
(29.11.)	Crvena zvezda – Šabac	75:61
(30.11.)	Vojvodina – Vrbas	0:20
(29.11.)	Šumadija – Radivoj Korać	64:70

9. round
(6.12.)	Radivoj Korać – Srbobran	101:52
(5.12.)	Vrbas – Šumadija	85:66
(7.12.)	Šabac – Vojvodina	69:77
(6.12.)	Partizan – Crvena zvezda	77:59
(7.12.)	Bor – Vršac	72:81
(6.12.)	Radnički – Spartak	75:55

10. round
(13.12.)	Srbobran – Spartak	51:58
(13.12.)	Vršac – Radnički	56:51
(13.12.)	Crvena zvezda – Bor	91:69
(14.12.)	Vojvodina – Partizan	80:74
(13.12.)	Šumadija – .Šabac	80:76
(13.12.)	Radivoj Korać – Vrbas	75:61

11. round
(17.12.)	Vrbas – Srbobran	86:69
(17.12.)	Šabac – Radivoj Korać	48:66
(18.12.)	Partizan – Šumadija	72:67
(17.12.)	Bor – Vojvodina	69:81
(17.12.)	Radnički – Crvena zvezda	83:75
(18.12.)	Spartak – Vršac	69:73

12. round
(22.12.)	Srbobran – Vršac	56:76
(22.12.)	Spartak – Crvena zvezda	54:60
(20.12.)	Radnički – Vojvodina	56:68
(21.12.)	Bor – Šumadija	62:72
(21.12.)	Partizan – Radivoj Korać	51:59
(20.12.)	Šabac – Vrbas	57:61

13. round
(10.1.)	Šabac – Srbobran	87:68
(10.1.)	Vrbas – Partizan	70:76
(10.1.)	Radivoj Korać – Bor	81:46
(10.1.)	Šumadija – Radnički	87:78
(9.1.)	Vojvodina – Spartak	86:72
(13.1.)	Crvena zvezda – Vršac	68:64

14. round
(16.1.)	Srbobran – Crvena zvezda	65:81
(18.1.)	Vršac – Vojvodina	92:86
(18.1.)	Spartak – Šumadija	44:49
(17.1.)	Radnički – Radivoj Korać	41:82
(17.1.)	Bor – Vrbas	56:54
(17.1.)	Partizan – Šabac	56:65

15. round
(22.1.)	Partizan – Srbobran	82:48
(21.1.)	Šabac – Bor	71:48
(21.1.)	Vrbas – Radnički	78:74
(20.1.)	Radivoj Korać – Spartak	88:59
(21.1.)	Šumadija – Vršac	66:68
(21.1.)	Vojvodina – Crvena zvezda	83:73

16. round
(24.1.)	Srbobran – Vojvodina	74:121
(25.1.)	Crvena zvezda – Šumadija	67:72
(24.1.)	Vršac – Radivoj Korać	60:69
(24.1.)	Spartak – Vrbas	78:72
(24.1.)	Radnički – Šabac	58:57
(24.1.)	Bor – Partizan	66:75

17. round
(31.1.)	Bor – Srbobran	65:49
(31.1.)	Partizan – Radnički	80:56
(31.1.)	Šabac – Spartak	67:71
(30.1.)	Vrbas – Vršac	79:64
(1.2.)	Radivoj Korać – Crvena zvezda	80:51
(31.1.)	Šumadija – Vojvodina	76:68

18. round
(7.2.)	Srbobran – Šumadija	65:92
(8.2.)	Vojvodina – Radivoj Korać	68:90
(7.2.)	Crvena zvezda – Vrbas	83:60
(7.2.)	Vršac – Šabac	60:75
(7.2.)	Spartak – Partizan	45:68
(7.2.)	Radnički – Bor	76:42

19. round
(14.2.)	Radnički – Srbobran	86:73
(14.2.)	Bor – Spartak	66:51
(15.2.)	Partizan – Vršac	78:57
(14.2.)	Šabac – Crvena zvezda	73:91
(13.2.)	Vrbas – Vojvodina	72:111
(14.2.)	Radivoj Korać – Šumadija	76:47

20. round
(17.2.)	Srbobran – Radivoj Korać	62:100
(18.2.)	Šumadija – Vrbas	83:63
(19.2.)	Vojvodina – Šabac	80:78
(18.2.)	Crvena zvezda – Partizan	56:62
(18.2.)	Vršac – Bor	52:65
(18.2.)	Spartak – Radnički	72:58

21. round
(21.2.)	Spartak – Srbobran	69:51
(21.2.)	Radnički – Vršac	69:44
(22.2.)	Bor – Crvena zvezda	54:64
(21.2.)	Partizan – Vojvodina	84:72
(22.2.)	Šabac – Šumadija	73:75
(21.2.)	Vrbas – Radivoj Korać	60:72

22. round
(27.2.)	Srbobran – Vrbas	0:20
(28.2.)	Radivoj Korać – Šabac	81:58
(28.2.)	Šumadija – Partizan	57:63
(1.3.)	Vojvodina – Bor	79:62
(2.3.)	Crvena zvezda – Radnički	72:63
(28.2.)	Vršac – Spartak	59:55

== Play Off ==
Play Off is played according to the cup system. Champion is received after the final was played. In the semifinals was played on 2 wins, in the Final at 3 wins. Play Off is played from 18. March 2015. to 15. April 2015.

=== Semifinals ===
Game 1

March 19
18:30

Report

Radivoj Korać	75–56	Šumadija Kragujevac
Scoring by quarter: 26-17, 16-11, 16-14, 17-14
Pts: Kapor 17; Rebs: Brajković 8 Asts: Jakšić 5		Pts: Mijatović 14; Rebs: Mijatović 8 Asts: Milošević 6
1:0

SC Šumice, Belgrade
Attendance: 150
Referees: Petrović, Oabrašić, Hadžić

March 18
19:00

Report

Partizan	66–73	Vojvodina
Scoring by quarter: 20-22, 14-19, 21-15, 11-17
Pts: Radunović 19; Rebs: Radunović 16; Asts: Janković 6		Pts: Pašić, Vučetić 27; Rebs: Vida 10; Asts: Vučetić 5
0:1

New Belgrade Sports Hall, Belgrade
Attendance: 540
Referees: Grujić, Marković, Kovinić

Game 2

March 22
18:15

Report

Šumadija Kragujevac	45–52	Radivoj Korać
Scoring by quarter: 15-10, 12-14, 12-7, 6-21
Pts: Milošević 18; Rebs: Raković, Mijatović 8 Asts: Milošević, Katić 3		Pts: Kapor 14; Rebs: Erak 14; Asts: Kapor 5
0:2

Hall Gordana Goca Bogojević, Kragujevac
Attendance: 50
Referees: Dimovski, Nikitović, Dašić

March 23
18:00

Report

Vojvodina	87–56	Partizan
Scoring by quarter: 23-18, 18-16, 19-9, 27-13
Pts: Vučetić 32; Rebs: Pašić 9 Asts: Vučetić, Pašić 5		Pts: Janković 16; Rebs: Janković 11; Asts: Vučković 4
2:0

SPC Vojvodina, Novi Sad
Attendance: 176
Referees: Nedeljković, Đorđević, Đurić

=== Final ===
March 27
20:30

Report

Radivoj Korać	76–58	Vojvodina
Scoring by quarter: 23-16, 16-16, 20-11, 17-15
Pts: Topuzivić 19; Rebs: Topuzivić 16; Asts: Mandić 5		Pts: Vučetić 21; Rebs: three players 8 Asts: Vučetić 4
1:0

SC Šumice, Belgrade
Attendance: 200
Referees: Heđeši, Stamenković. Krstić

Game 2

April 5
19:00

Report

Vojvodina	78–72	Radivoj Korać
Scoring by quarter: 27-19, 14-15, 20-11, 17-27
Pts: Vučetić 35; Rebs: Laković 10; Asts: Vučetić 9		Pts: Kapor 24; Rebs: Topuzović 16; Asts: Kapor 5
1:1

SPC Vojvodina, Novi Sad
Attendance: 150
Referees: Semjaniv, Smiljanić, Novaković

Game 3

April 9
20:00

Report

Radivoj Korać	74–68	Vojvodina
Scoring by quarter: 21-18, 10-16, 27-14, 16-20
Pts: Erak 14; Rebs: Erak 18; Asts: three players 3		Pts: Vučetić 22; Rebs: Vida, Laković 7 Asts: Vučetić 5
2:1

SC Šumice, Belgrade
Attendance: 300
Referees: Ivanović, Savić, Vukanović

Game 4

April 15
17:00

Report

Vojvodina	72–77	Radivoj Korać
Scoring by quarter: 25-15, 11-22, 23-21, 13-19
Pts: Pašić 24; Rebs: Laković 11; Asts: Pašić 3		Pts: Kapor 17; Rebs: Erak 15; Asts: three players
1:3

SPC Vojvodina, Novi Sad
Attendance: Ivanović, Arsić, Smiljanić
Referees: 150

=== Bracket ===
Semifinals
1	Radivoj Korać	2
4	Šumadija Kragujevac	0
2	Partizan	0
3	Vojvodina	2

Final
1	Radivoj Korać	3
3	Vojvodina	1

== Awards ==
- Finals MVP: Kristina Topuzović (183-F/G-94) of Radivoj Korać
- Player of the Year: Jelena Vučetić (178-G-93) of Vojvodina
- Point Guard of the Year: Jelena Vučetić (178-G-93) of Vojvodina
- Power Forward of the Year: Kristina Topuzović (183-F/G-94) of Radivoj Korać
- Center of the Year: Ivana Brajković (195-C-93) of Radivoj Korać
- Coach of the Year: Miloš Pavlović of Radivoj Korać

1st Team

- G: Jelena Vučetić (178-G-93) of Vojvodina
- G: Tamara Kapor (184-G-91) of Radivoj Korać
- F/G: Jovana Jakšić (178-F/G-92) of Radivoj Korać
- F/G: Kristina Topuzović (183-F/G-94) of Radivoj Korać
- C: Ivana Brajković (195-C-93) of Radivoj Korać

2nd Team

- PG: Aleksandra Katanić (172-PG-97) of Crvena zvezda
- G: Jelena Ćulafić (172-G-89) of Šumadija Kragujevac
- SG: Sanja Mandić (178-SG-95) of Radivoj Korać
- F: Jovana Pasić (180-F-92) of Vojvodina
- F/C: Kristina Raković (186-F/C-94) of Šumadija Kragujevac

3rd Team

- G: Rada Vidović (177-G-79) of Spartak Subotica
- G: Marija Prlja (163-G-87) of SBS Ostrava
- F: Bojana Janković (184-F-83) of Partizan
- F/C: Nataša Mijatović (191-F/C-89) of Šumadija Kragujevac
- C: Milica Cvetanović (195-C-86) of Radnički Kragujevac

Honorable Mention

- Vida Emeše (188-F/C-93) of Vojvodina
- Milena Laković (93) of Vojvodina
- Marina Mandić (182-F-83) of Vršac
- Branka Luković (190-PF-95) of Partizan
- Kristina Milošević (177-F-90) of Šumadija Kragujevac
- Tijana Čukić (173-PG-96) of Vrbas Medela
- Miljana Džombeta (169-PG-94) of Čelik Zenica
- Žaklina Janković (190-C/F-94) of Vršac
- Mina Đorđevic (186-PF-99) of Crvena zvezda
- Aleksandra Katanić (172-PG-97) of Crvena zvezda
- Bojana Stevanović (180-PF-96) of Radnički Kragujevac
- Mirjana Velisavljević (188-C-78) of Šabac
- Anđelina Radić (187-F-94) of Vojvodina
