= 2011–12 Women's A Basketball League of Serbia =

- League: Women's A Basketball League of Serbia
- Sport: Basketball
- Duration: 2 October 2011 – 13 May 2012
- Games: 188
- Teams: 17

2011–12
- Season champions: Partizan (6th title)
- Season MVP: (Serbia) Aleksandra Katić

Serbian First League seasons
- ← 2010–11 2012–13 →

The 2011–12 Women's A Basketball League of Serbia is the 6th season of the First Women's Basketball League of Serbia, the highest professional basketball league in Serbia. It is also 68th national championship played by Serbian clubs inclusive of nation's previous incarnations as Yugoslavia and Serbia & Montenegro.

The first half of the season consists of 12 teams and 132-game regular season (22 games for each of the 12 teams) began on 1 October 2011 and will end on 4 March 2012. The second part of the season consists of two parts, the playoffs and Play Out.

In the Play Off playing eight teams, 5 from Adriatic League and 3 from First Women's Basketball League of Serbia. In the Play Out playing six teams it turns out that the last team. After the regular season it turns the bottom team and one team in Play Out.

== Team information ==
Team	City	Arena	Capacity
Beočin	Beočin	SPC Beočin	1,000
Crvena zvezda	Belgrade	Basket city Hall	1,600
Jagodina 2001	Jagodina	JASSA Sports Center	2,600
Partizan	Belgrade	Belgrade Sport Palace	5,000
Proleter Zrenjanin	Zrenjanin	Medison Hall	3.000
Radivoj Korać	Belgrade	Sport EKO Hall	1,000
Radnički Kragujevac	Kragujevac	Hall Gordana Goca Bogojević	600
Spartak Subotica	Subotica	Sport Palace Subotica	3,500
Stara Pazova	Stara Pazova	Sport Palace Stara Pazova	300
Student Niš	Niš	Dušan Radović School Hall	1,000
Šabac	Šabac	Šabac High School Hall	500
Loznica	Loznica	Lagator	2,000
Čelarevo	Čelarevo	SD Čelarevo	400
Vojvodina	Novi Sad	SPC Vojvodina	1,030
Vrbas	Vrbas	CFK Vrbas	2,000
Hemofarm	Vršac	Millennium Center	5,000
Voždovac	Belgrade	SC Šumice	2,000

Teams from Adriatic League

== Regular season ==
The League of the season was played with 13 teams and play a dual circuit system, each with each one game at home and away. The three best teams at the end of the regular season were placed in the Play Off. The regular season began on 2 October 2011 and it will end on 4 March 2012.

Place	Team	Pld	W	L	PF	PA	Diff	Pts	
1.	Crvena zvezda	22	21	1	1773	1303	+470	43	Play Off
2.	Jagodina 2001	22	18	4	1782	1620	+162	40	Play Off
3.	Vrbas	22	15	7	1682	1573	+109	37	Play Off
4.	Šabac	22	18	8	1570	1512	+58	36	Play Out
5.	Radnički Kragujevac	22	11	11	1463	1397	+66	33	Play Out
6.	Beočin	22	10	12	1513	1603	-90	32	Play Out
7.	Čelarevo	22	10	12	1424	1428	-4	32	Play Out
8.	Stara Pazova	22	9	13	1572	1522	+50	31	Play Out
9.	Student Niš	22	8	14	1436	1487	-51	30	Play Out
10.	Spartak Subotica	22	8	14	1486	1549	-63	30	Play Out
11.	Proleter Zrenjanin	22	5	17	1507	1736	-229	27	Play Out
12.	Loznica (-1)	22	3	19	1244	1722	-478	24	Play Out

Qualified for Play Off
Played in Play Out

== Play Off ==
Play Off is played according to the cup system. Champion is received after the final was played. The final was played on 3 wins, while in other parts the Play Off at 2 victory. Play Off is played from 14. March 2012. to 8. April 2012.

Quarter Finals
Partizan	2
Vrbas	0
Radivoj Korać	1
Vojvodina	2
Hemofarm	2
Jagodina 2001	0
Voždovac	2
Crvena zvezda	1

Semifinals
Partizan	2
Vojvodina	0
Hemofarm	2
Voždovac	3

Finals
Partizan	3
Hemofarm	0

== Play Out ==
In play out all the clubs play against each other, and the worst ranked team in play out is relegation of the league. Play Out is played from 17. March 2012. - 13. May 2012.

Place	Team	Pld	W	L	PF	PA	Diff	Pts	
1.	Šabac	24	19	5	1697	1513	+184	43	
2.	Stara Pazova	24	16	8	1726	1485	+241	40	
3.	Radnički Kragujevac	24	15	9	1582	1429	+153	39	
4.	Student Niš	24	13	11	1618	1551	+67	37	
5.	Čelarevo	24	13	11	1561	1472	+68	37	
6.	Beočin	24	12	12	1642	1627	+15	36	
7.	Proleter Zrenjanin	24	9	15	1673	1796	-123	33	
8.	Spartak Subotica	24	9	15	1572	1592	-20	33	Relegation
9.	Loznica	24	2	22	1220	1826	-606	26	Relegation

Relegated to Second League

== Awards ==
- Player of the Year: Aleksandra Katić (172-G-87) of Radnički Kragujevac
- Guard of the Year: Aleksandra Katić (172-G-87) of Radnički Kragujevac
- Forward of the Year: Sonja Marić (185-F-85) of Čelarevo
- Center of the Year: Mirjana Velisavljević (188-C-78) of Šabac
- Defensive Player of the Year: Kristina Milošević (177-F-90) of Radnički Kragujevac
- Coach of the Year: Marina Maljković of Partizan

1st Team

- PG: Milica Dabović (175-82) of Partizan
- G: Saša Čađo (178-89) of Hemofarm
- G: Aleksandra Katić (172-87) of Radnički Kragujevac
- F: Ana Nikšić (181-91) of Crvena zvezda
- C: Mirjana Velisavljević (188-78) of Šabac

2nd Team

- G: Tamara Petković (170-89) of Jagodina 2001
- G: Jelena Prvulović (177-91) of Radnički Kragujevac
- F: Snježana Vasić (178-75) of Stara Pazova
- C: Marija Ilić (190-85) of Student Niš
- C: Jelena Marinkov (185-90) of Proleter Zrenjanin

Honorable Mention

- Vida Emeše (188-F/C-93) of Spartak Subotica
- Iva Musulin (170-G-84) of Stara Pazova
- Marija Kovačić (197-C-78) of Jagodina 2001
- Ivana Grubor (185-F/C-84) of Jagodina 2001
- Danijela Varda (195-C-74) of Beočin
