= 2015–16 First Women's Basketball League of Serbia =

- League: First League of Serbia
- Sport: Basketball
- Duration: 10 October 2015 – 16 April 2016
- Games: 139
- Teams: 12
- Total attendance: 2520 (in Play Off)

2015–16
- Season champions: Radivoj Korać (3rd title)
- Season MVP: (Serbia) Sanja Mandić
- Top scorer: (Montenegro) Jelena Nikpaljević

Serbian First League seasons
- ← 2014–15 2016–17 →

The 2015–16 First Women's Basketball League of Serbia is the 10th season of the First Women's Basketball League of Serbia, the highest professional basketball league in Serbia. It is also 72nd national championship played by Serbian clubs inclusive of nation's previous incarnations as Yugoslavia and Serbia & Montenegro.

The first half of the season consists of 12 teams and 132-game regular season (22 games for each of the 12 teams).

Partizan is left the competition and moved in lower rank, and therefore stayed Bor in the league.

== Team information ==
Team	City	Arena	Capacity
Bor	Bor	SC Bor	4.000
Crvena zvezda	Belgrade	Basket city Hall	1.600
Kraljevo	Kraljevo	Kraljevo Sports Hall	3.350
Novosadska ŽKA	Novi Sad	SPC Vojvodina - big hall	11.500
Radivoj Korać	Belgrade	Sport EKO Hall; SC Šumice	1.000; 2.000
Radnički Kragujevac	Kragujevac	Hall Gordana Goca Bogojević	600
Spartak Subotica	Subotica	Sport Palace Subotica	3.500
Student Niš	Niš	Dušan Radović School Hall	1.000
Vojvodina NS	Novi Sad	SPC Vojvodina - small hall	1.030
Vrbas Medela	Vrbas	CFK Vrbas	2.500
Vršac Swisslion	Vršac	Millennium Center	5.000
Šumadija Kragujevac	Kragujevac	Hall Gordana Goca Bogojević	600

Teams from Adriatic League

== Regular season ==
The League of the season was played with 12 teams and play a dual circuit system, each with each one game at home and away. The four best teams at the end of the regular season were placed in the Play Off. The regular season began on 10 October 2015 and it will end on 10 March 2016.

=== Standings ===
Pos	Team	Pld	W	L	PF	PA	PD	Pts	Qualification or relegation
1	Radivoj Korać	22	22	0	1739	1181	+558	44	Qualified for Play Off
2	Crvena zvezda	22	17	5	1668	1289	+379	39	Qualified for Play Off
3	Vrbas Medela	22	15	7	1691	1434	+257	37	Qualified for Play Off
4	Vršac Swisslion	22	14	8	1528	1389	+139	36	Qualified for Play Off
5	Kraljevo	22	14	8	1507	1332	+175	36	
6	Student Niš	22	11	11	1471	1506	−35	33	
7	Spartak Subotica	22	11	11	1320	1310	+10	33	
8	Novosadska ŽKA	22	8	14	1399	1537	−138	30	
9	Vojvodina NS	22	7	15	1743	1894	−151	29	
10	Šumadija Kragujevac	22	7	15	1408	1518	−110	29	
11	Radnički Kragujevac	22	6	16	1510	1628	−118	28	Relegated to Second League
12	Bor	22	0	22	1004	1970	−966	21 (Note: 1 point deducted)	Relegated to Second League

=== Results ===
Home \ Away	BOR	CZV	KRA	NŽKA	RAK	RKG	SPA	STU	VOJ	VRB	VRŠ	ŠKG
Bor		32–94	36–107	45–85	44–82	57–79	39–94	63–94	72–128	61–103	46–74	62–81
Crvena zvezda	114–31		71–52	64–52	46–58	81–62	89–59	78–47	92–69	69–55	65–57	78–53
Kraljevo	80–37	59–69		87–48	51–76	68–56	49–54	75–49	98–73	66–61	62–54	75–55
Novosadska ŽKA	84–45	48–71	57–60		46–72	68–65	71–55	56–73	99–97	59–71	66–60	67–77
Radivoj Korać	103–26	83–82	77–54	79–42		71–61	66–47	84–50	124–35	86–75	86–74	62–51
Radnički Kragujevac	85–49	61–80	67–60	71–60	55–87		47–58	84–63	90–105	66–61	69–71	69–83
Spartak Subotica	20–0	78–65	49–64	64–43	52–76	69–56		61–53	96–79	60–65	65–66	74–60
Student Niš	89–51	73–69	51–54	83–73	49–69	79–71	69–50		80–66	70–78	74–67	57–47
Vojvodina NIS	95–59	66–97	74–80	74–79	70–83	119–85	64–81	92–75		64–83	68–86	78–75
Vrbas Medela	113–69	72–74	82–68	91–68	54–77	79–74	65–43	74–53	106–77		80–48	73–43
Vršac Swisslion	90–39	64–52	70–61	67–60	57–64	74–56	65–41	76–77	78–70	85–74		65–57
Šumadija Kragujevac	76–41	58–68	66–77	66–68	60–74	86–81	59–50	68–63	76–80	54–76	57–80	

Legend: Blue = home team win; Yellow = draw; Red = away team win.

== Play Off ==
Play Off is played according to the cup system. Champion is received after the final was played. In the semifinals was played on 2 wins, in the Final at 3 wins. Play Off is played from 26 March 2015. to 16 April 2015.

=== Semifinals ===
Game 1

27 March 2016
17:00

Report

Radivoj Korać	66–53	Vršac Swisslion
Scoring by quarter: 15:18, 12:18, 20:8, 19:9
Pts: Bučevac 16; Rebs: Bučevac 8 Asts: three players 2		Pts: Ćorda 20; Rebs: M. Mandić 10; Asts: Ćorda, Radović 4
1:0

SC Šumice, Belgrade
Attendance: 220
Referees: Ivanović, Arsić, Vlahović

26 March 2016
19:00

Report

Crvena zvezda	74–71 (OT)	Vrbas Medela
Scoring by quarter: 18:18, 14:16, 25:24, 8:7, Overtime: 9:6
Pts: Zec 27; Rebs: Bojović 9 Asts: Zec, Čolić 6		Pts: Jovović 22; Rebs: Zalar, Mijatović 10; Asts: Džombeta 10
1:0

Basket city Hall, Belgrade
Attendance: 150
Referees: Smiljanić, Grujić, Marković

Game 2

30 March 2016
18:00

Report

Vršac Swisslion	65–91	Radivoj Korać
Scoring by quarter: 12:31, 23:15, 11:20, 19:25
Pts: M. Mandić 25; Rebs: Janković 10; Asts: M. Mandić 4		Pts: S. Mandić 23; Rebs: Vasović 10; Asts: S. Mandić, L. Vučković 5
0:2

Millennium Center, Vršac
Attendance: Pavlica, Savić, Živković
Referees: 300

31 March 2016
19:30

Report

Vrbas Medela	58–68	Crvena zvezda
Scoring by quarter: 14:17, 13:17, 22:15, 9:19
Pts: Mijatović 20; Rebs: Mijatović 10; Asts: Cukić 5		Pts: Zec 18; Rebs: Đorđević 11; Asts: Čolić 4
0:2

CFK Drago Jovović, Vrbas
Attendance: 650
Referees: Juras, Ivanović, Virijević

=== Final ===
Game 1

9 April 2016
21:00

Report

Radivoj Korać	84–59	Crvena zvezda
Scoring by quarter: 23:20, 27:12, 22:9, 12:18
Pts: Pašić 21; Rebs: Bučevac 6 Asts: S. Mandić, L. Vučković 7		Pts: Čolić 13; Rebs: Đorđević 7 Asts: I. Katanić 3
1:0

SC Šumice, Belgrade
Attendance: 500
Referees: Juras, Arsić, Đorđević

Game 2

13 April 2016
19:30

Report

Crvena zvezda	51–62	Radivoj Korać
Scoring by quarter: 11:20, 18:12, 14:10, 8:20
Pts: Zec 18; Rebs: Đorđević 7 Asts: Čolić 13		Pts: S. Mandić 23; Rebs: Erak 14; Asts: S. Mandić 4
0:2

Basket City Hall, Belgrade
Attendance: 200
Referees: Ivanović, Virijević, Pavlica

Game 3

16 April 2016
18:00

Report

Radivoj Korać	73–63	Crvena zvezda
Scoring by quarter: 14:11, 25:22, 13:16, 21:14
Pts: Pašić 21; Rebs: Pašić 9 Asts: S. Mandić 9		Pts: Čolić 21; Rebs: Đorđević 10; Asts: Čolić 4
3:0

SC Šumice, Belgrade
Attendance: 500
Referees: Juras, Ivanović, Virijević

=== Bracket ===
Semifinals
1	Radivoj Korać	2
4	Vršac Swisslion	0
2	Crvena zvezda	2
3	Vrbas Medela	0

Final
1	Radivoj Korać	3
2	Crvena zvezda	0

== Awards ==
- Finals MVP: Jovana Pašić (180-F-92) of Radivoj Korać
- Player of the Year: Marina Mandić (182-F-83) of Vršac Swisslion
- Guard of the Year: Sanja Mandić (178-SG-95) of Radivoj Korać
- Forward of the Year: Marina Mandić (182-F-83) of Vršac Swisslion
- Center of the Year: Nataša Mijatović (191-F/C-89) of Vrbas Medela
- Defensive player of the year: Nataša Bučevac (179-F-85) of Radivoj Korać
- Most Improved Player of the Year: Katarina Zec (178-G-97) of Crvena zvezda
- Coach of the Year: Dragan Vuković of Crvena zvezda

1st Team

- SG: Sanja Mandić (178-SG-95) of Radivoj Korać
- G: Katarina Zec (178-G-97) of Crvena zvezda
- F: Jovana Pašić (180-F-92) of Radivoj Korać
- F: Marina Mandić (182-F-83) of Vršac Swisslion
- F/C: Nataša Mijatović (191-F/C-89) of Vrbas Medela

2nd Team

- G: Snežana Čolić (178-G-92) of Crvena zvezda
- G: Jelena Nikpaljević (175-G-94) of Bor
- G/F: Tanja Ćirov (181-G/F-81) of Student Niš
- SF: Ivana Jovović (185-SF-89) of Vrbas Medela
- F/C: Milena Vukićević (188-F/C-80) of Student Niš

Honorable Mention

- Tijana Cukić (173-PG-96) of Vrbas Medela
- Snežana Bogičević (188-C-90) of Crvena zvezda
- Marijana Paunović (188-C-90) of Kraljevo
- Bojana Stevanović (180-PF-96) of Radnički Kragujevac
- Nataša Kovačević (188-F-94) of Crvena zvezda
- Jelena Mitrović (204-C-1) of Novosadska ŽKA
- Ines Ćorda (169-PG-95) of Vršac Swisslion
- Marina Ristić (168-G-87) of Kraljevo
- Rada Vidović (177-G-79) of Slovanka MB
- Mina Đorđević (186-PF-99) of Crvena zvezda
- Miljana Džombeta (169-PG-94) of Vrbas Medela
- Nataša Bučevac (179-F-85) of Radivoj Korać
