= Jovana Karakašević =

Serbian basketball player

Jovana Karakašević Joka
Personal information
- Born: May 17, 1992 (age 34) Senta, FR Yugoslavia
- Listed height: 1.90 m (6 ft 3 in)

Career information
- WNBA draft: 2014: undrafted
- Playing career: 2005–present
- Position: Center

Career history
- 2005–2010: Vojvodina
- 2010–2011: Partizan
- 2011–2012: Crvena zvezda
- 2012: Subrina Ilirija
- 2013: Srbobran
- 2013: Partizan
- 2014: MTK
- 2014: Partizan
- 2015: Hibernians
- 2015–2016: Šumadija Kragujevac
- 2016–present: ICIM Arad

Jovana Karakašević (Serbian: Јована Кaрaкaшевић; born 17 May 1992) is a Serbian female basketball player.

== Personal life ==
Jovana is a sister of Serbian basketball player Jefimija Karakašević.
