= Erice (disambiguation) =

Erice is a municipality in Sicily.

Erice may also refer to:

== People ==
- Diego de Erice (born 1986), Mexican actor, director and writer
- Edgar Erice (born 1960), Filipino politician
- Jon Erice (born 1986), Spanish footballer
- Víctor Erice (born 1940), Spanish film director
- Erice van Leuven (born 2006), New Zealand mountain biker

== Other uses ==
- Erice, a village in Iza – Itza, Spain
- Monte Erice, a mountain of Sicily
- Caspase 13 or ERICE (evolutionarily related interleukin-1β converting enzyme), a protein in cattle

== See also ==
- Eryx (disambiguation)
- Eric (disambiguation)
- Erice statement, 2010, a statement about freedom of expression for scientists and nuclear disarmament
