= Zichichi =

Zichichi (pronounced [dziˈkiːki]) is an Italian surname of Arabic origin from Sicily, probably derived from zaqqāq (زقاق), 'wineskin maker or seller'. Notable people with the surname include:

- Alvise Zichichi (1938–2003), Italian chess master
- Antonino Zichichi (1929–2026), Italian physicist

== See also ==
- 3951 Zichichi, an asteroid named after Antonino Zichichi
