= Eric (disambiguation) =

Eric is a common given name.

Eric, Erik, Erich, or Erick may also refer to:

== Arts and media ==
- Eric, a 1975 American television film directed by James Goldstone for Hallmark Hall of Fame
- Eric (miniseries), a 2024 Netflix television miniseries
- Eric (novel), a 1990 Discworld novel by Terry Pratchett
- Eric, or, Little by Little, an 1858 novel by Frederic W. Farrar
- Erik, a 2004 album by Erik Rubin
- "Eric", a 2013 song by Mitski from Lush

== People ==
- Erić, a Serbian surname
- Erik (Vietnamese singer)
- Erik (British singer)
- Eric (Croatian singer)
- Erik (wrestler), American professional wrestler
- Eric (footballer, born 1977), East Timorese footballer (midfielder)
- Eric (footballer, born 1989), Brazilian footballer (striker)
- Erik (footballer, born 1994), Brazilian footballer (forward)
- Erik (footballer, born 1995), Brazilian footballer (forward)
- Erick (footballer, born November 1997), Brazilian footballer (midfielder)
- Erick (footballer, born December 1997), Brazilian footballer (forward)
- Eric (footballer, born 2000), Brazilian footballer (left back)
- Erik (footballer, born 2001), Emirati footballer (left back)
- Erich Albrecht (footballer), German Footballer (forward)

== Places ==
- Erich, Uttar Pradesh, a town and nagar panchayat in Jhansi district, Uttar Pradesh, India
- Erick, Oklahoma, second westernmost town in Beckham County, Oklahoma, United States

== Other ==
- Eric (robot), a robot built in 1928
- Eric (software), a free integrated-development environment
- 4954 Eric, an asteroid
- SS Erich, a West German cargo ship
- Tropical Storm Erick, a list of tropical cyclones
- Electronic Registration Information Center (ERIC), a multi-state shared database of voter registration data in the US
- Education Resources Information Center (ERIC), an online digital library of education research and information
- European Research Infrastructure Consortium (ERIC), a legal entity in the European Union
- Ericsson, Swedish telecommunications company (stock ticker ERIC)
- Erik (HBC vessel), a propeller driven steamship
- Erik (The Phantom of the Opera), the title character from Gaston Leroux's 1910 novel Le Fantôme de l'Opéra
- "Eric", the nickname for the holotype specimen of the plesiosaur Umoonasaurus demoscyllus

== See also ==
- Ericsson (disambiguation)
