= Ivana Grubor =

Serbian basketball player

Personal information
- Born: 28 June 1984 (age 42) Novi Sad, SFR Yugoslavia
- Listed height: 1.84 m (6 ft 0 in)

Career information
- WNBA draft: 2006: undrafted
- Position: Power forward / center

Career history
- 2006–2009: Vojvodina
- 2009–2010: Radivoj Korać
- 2010–2011: Crvena zvezda
- 2011: Aris
- 2011–2014: Jagodina 2001
- 2014–2015: Šumadija Kragujevac
- 2015–2017: Radnički Kragujevac
- 2018: Cairo, Egypt (Tourniers)

Ivana Grubor (Serbian Cyrillic: Ивана Грубор, born 28 June 1984 in Novi Sad, SFR Yugoslavia) is a former Serbian female basketball player.
