= Jefimija Karakašević =

Serbian basketball player

No. 8 – ICIM Arad
- Position: Power forward / center
- League: First League of Romania

Personal information
- Born: 13 August 1989 (age 37) Senta, SFR Yugoslavia
- Listed height: 1.91 m (6 ft 3 in)

Career information
- WNBA draft: 2011: undrafted
- Playing career: 2006–present

Career history
- 2006–2009: Vojvodina
- 2009–2010: Mladi Krajišnik
- 2010–2011: Partizan
- 2011–2012: Voždovac
- 2012–2013: CUS Chieti
- 2013: Northland Luleå
- 2014: Norrkoping Dolphins
- 2014–2016: Danzio Timișoara
- 2016: CSU Alba Iulia
- 2016–: ICIM Arad
Medals
Women's basketball
Representing Serbia
Mediterranean Games
Silver medal – second place	2009 Pescara	Team

Jefimija Karakašević (Serbian: Јефимија Кaрaкaшевић; born 13 August 1989) is a Serbian female basketball player.

== Personal life ==
Jefimija is a sister of Serbian basketball player Jovana Karakašević.
