= EuroBasket Women 2003 squads =

== Group A ==
=== Serbia and Montenegro ===
Serbia and Montenegro roster
Players
Coaches

Pos.	No.	Name	Age – Date of birth	Height	Club
	4	Gordana Bogojević	–
	5	Katarina Manić	–
	6	Biljana Stanković	–
	7	Lara Mandić	–
	8	Milka Bjelica	–
	9	Gordana Grubin	–
	10	Hajdana Radunović	–
	11	Ivana Matović	–
	12	Ljubica Drljača	–
	13	Slobodanka Tuvić	–
	14	Ana Joković	–
	15	Daliborka Vilipić	–

Head coach

- Miodrag Vesković

Legend

- (C) Team captain
- nat field describes country
  of last club
  before the tournament
- Age field is age on June 7, 2003
