= Luka Vuksanović =

Serbian basketball player

Personal information
- Born: March 15, 1995 (age 31) Kraljevo, FR Yugoslavia
- Listed height: 2.01 m (6 ft 7 in)

Career information
- Playing career: 2013–present
- Position: Small forward / shooting guard

Career history
- 2013–2014: Sloga
- 2014–2015: Metalac Farmakom
- 2015: Jagodina
- 2015–2017: Sloga

Luka Vuksanović (Serbian Cyrillic: Лука Вуксановић, born 15 March 1995) is a Serbian professional basketball player.

After spending a season and a half for his hometown's Sloga, he signed for Metalac on 26 December 2014.
