= Delchev =

Delchev (Bulgarian: Делчев) is a Bulgarian masculine surname, its feminine counterpart is Delcheva. It may refer to

- Aleksander Delchev (born 1971), Bulgarian chess grandmaster and chess author
- Aleksandra Delcheva (born 1987), Bulgarian volleyball player
- Gotse Delchev (1872–1903), revolutionary figure in Ottoman-ruled Macedonia
  - Gotse Delchev (town) in southwestern Bulgaria
  - PFC Pirin Gotse Delchev, a Bulgarian football club, based in Gotse Delchev
  - Gotse Delchev Municipality in Bulgaria
  - Gotse Delchev, Blagoevgrad Province, a town in Gotse Delchev Municipality
  - Delchev Ridge in Antarctica, named after Gotse
  - Delchev Peak in Antarctica, named after Gotse
- Ruzha Delcheva (1915–2002), Bulgarian stage and film actress
