= Ettore Majorana Foundation and Centre for Scientific Culture =

Coordinates: 38.03778°N 12.58749°E

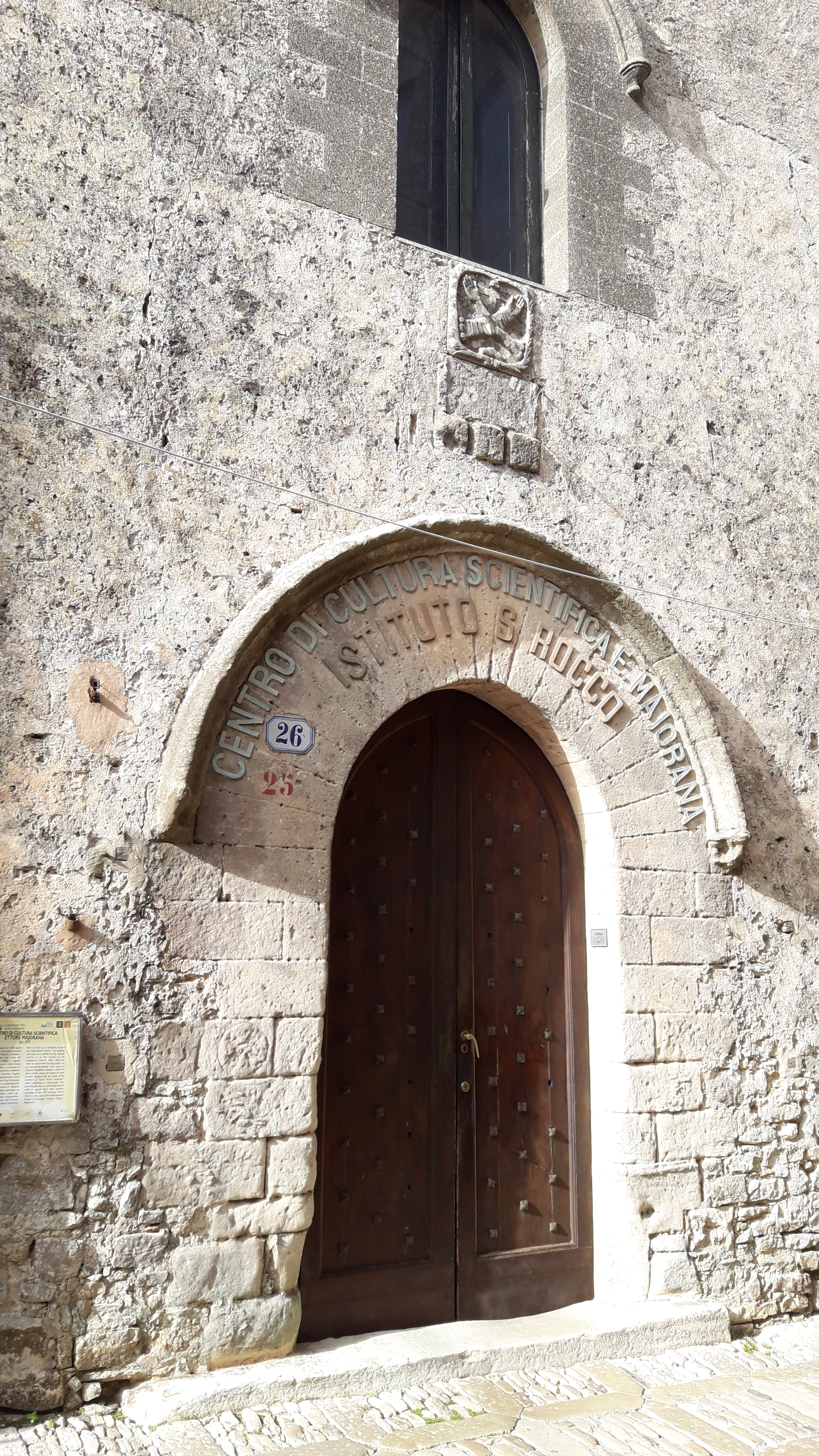
The Foundation and Centre for Scientific Culture

Ettore Majorana Foundation and Centre for Scientific Culture (acronym EMFCSC) is a scientific organization based in Erice, Sicily, Italy. The President of EMFCSC is Prof. Antonino Zichichi. It sponsors the International School of Subnuclear Physics whose Director is Prof. Antonino Zichichi.

== See also ==
- Erice statement
