= Erić =

Erić is a Serbian surname. Notable people with the surname include:

- Dobrica Erić (1936–2019), Serbian writer
- Filip Erić (born 1994), Serbian football player
- Jelena Erić (handballer) (born 1979), Serbian handball player
- Jelena Erić (cyclist) (born 1996), Serbian racing cyclist
- Marija Erić (born 1983), Serbian basketball player
- Nenad Erić (born 1982), Serbian and Kazakhstani footballer
- Ninoslav Erić (born 1976), Serbian politician
- Petar Erić (c. 1780-after 1821), Serbian revolutionary
- Slađana Erić (born 1983), Serbian volleyball player
- Zoran Erić (1950–2024), Serbian composer

== See also ==
- Eric
