= Erico =

Erico is a masculine given name which may refer to:

- Erico Aumentado (1940–2012), Filipino politician
- Erico Aristotle Aumentado (born 1977), Filipino businessman and politician
- Eric Erico Barney (born 1941), Argentine former pole vaulter
- Érico Castro (born 1992), Angolan football attacking midfielder
- Érico de Paula Coelho Filho (1944–2014), also known as Nenê (footballer, born 1944), Brazilian footballer and manager
- Erico Cuna (born 2000), Angolan swimmer
- Erico Basilio Fabian (born 1957), Filipino politician
- Erico Hori (born 1988), stage name Pile, Japanese singer and actress
- Erico Menczer (1926–2012), Italian cinematographer
- Erico Constantino da Silva, also known as Erico (footballer, born 1989), Brazilian football centre-back
- Érico Sousa (born 1995), Portuguese football midfielder
- Érico de Souza (born 1947), Brazilian rower
- Erico Spinadel (1929–2020), Austrian-born Argentine industrial engineer
- Erico Verissimo (1905–1975), Brazilian writer

== See also ==
- Eric (disambiguation)
- Erica (disambiguation)
