= Noriyuki Kanzaki =

Japanese figure skater

Japanese name
- Kanji: 神崎範之
- Kana: かんざき のりゆき

Noriyuki Kanzaki
Personal information
- Born: December 12, 1982 (age 43) Nagoya, Japan
- Height: 1.74 m (5 ft 8 1/2 in)

Figure skating career
- Country: Japan
- Began skating: 1989
- Retired: 2007

Noriyuki Kanzaki (神崎 範之, Kanzaki Noriyuki; born December 12, 1982) is a Japanese former competitive figure skater. He is the 2005 Nebelhorn Trophy silver medalist and placed seventh at the 2007 Four Continents Championships.

== Programs ==
Season	Short program	Free skating
2006–2007	Bolero by Maurice Ravel	The Phantom of the Opera by Andrew Lloyd Webber
2003–2004	Tango; Seasons by Astor Piazzolla	Lord of the Rings by Howard Shore

== Competitive highlights ==
International
Event	96–97	97–98	98–99	99–00	00–01	01–02	02–03	03–04	04–05	05–06	06–07
Four Continents Champ.											7th
Nebelhorn Trophy								8th		2nd	
Winter Universiade											7th
National
Japan Championships							9th	10th	7th	10th	4th
Japan Junior	11th		16th	11th							
