= Dara Kovačević =

Serbian basketball player

Personal information
- Born: 13 March 1983 (age 43) Bačka Palanka, SFR Yugoslavia
- Listed height: 1.97 m (6 ft 6 in)

Career information
- WNBA draft: 2005: undrafted
- Playing career: 1998–2016
- Position: Center

Career history
- 1998–2011: Hemofarm
- 2011–2012: Joventud Mariana
- 2012: C.S.M. Târgoviște
- 2012–2013: CSM Satu Mare
- 2013–2014: Srbobran
- 2014–2015: Spartak Noginsk
- 2015–2016: Olimpia Brasov
- 2016: Vojvodina
Medals
Women's basketball
Representing Serbia
European U16 Championship
Silver medal – second place	1999 Romania	Team

Dara Kovačević, (Serbian Cyrillic: Дара Ковачевић; born 13 March 1983 in Bačka Palanka, SFR Yugoslavia) is a former Serbian basketball player.
