= Tanja Ćirov =

Bulgarian-Serbian basketball player

Personal information
- Born: 26 February 1981 (age 45) Bor, SR Serbia, SFR Yugoslavia
- Listed height: 1.81 m (5 ft 11 in)

Career information
- WNBA draft: 2003: undrafted
- Playing career: 1993–2016
- Position: Small forward / shooting guard

Career history
- 1993–1998: Bor
- 1998–1999: Student Niš
- 1999–2002: Gimnazijalac Niš
- 2002–2004: Student Niš
- 2004: Maccabi Ramat Hen
- 2004–2006: Kimiko
- 2006–2007: CSKA Sofia
- 2007–2008: Napoli
- 2008–2012: Libertas Trogylos Basket
- 2012–2013: Canik Belediyesi
- 2013: Radnički Kragujevac
- 2013–2014: Dunav Ruse
- 2014–2015: Vigarano
- 2015–2016: Student Niš

Tanja Ćirov (Serbian Cyrillic: Тања Ћиров; Bulgarian: Таня Чиров, romanized: Tanya Chirov; born 26 February 1981) is a Bulgarian-Serbian female professional basketball player.
