= Marija Erić =

Serbian basketball player

Personal information
- Born: 2 May 1983 (age 43) Belgrade, SFR Yugoslavia
- Listed height: 164 cm (5 ft 5 in)

Career information
- WNBA draft: 2005: undrafted
- Playing career: 2002–2016
- Position: Point guard

Career history
- 2002–2004: Crvena zvezda
- 2004–2005: Vojvodina
- 2005–2006: Cavezzo
- 2006–2008: Faenza
- 2008–2009: Dynamo Kursk
- 2009–2010: Napoli
- 2010–2011: Tarbes
- 2011: Priolo
- 2011–2012: Faenza
- 2012–2013: Priolo
- 2013: Spartak Noginsk
- 2013–2014: Priolo
- 2014–2015: Lazùr Catania
- 2015–2016: Palmares Catania

Marija Erić (Serbian Cyrillic: Марија Ерић, born 2 May 1983 in Belgrade, SFR Yugoslavia) is a Serbian female basketball player. She plays point guard position.
