= San Vittore Observatory =

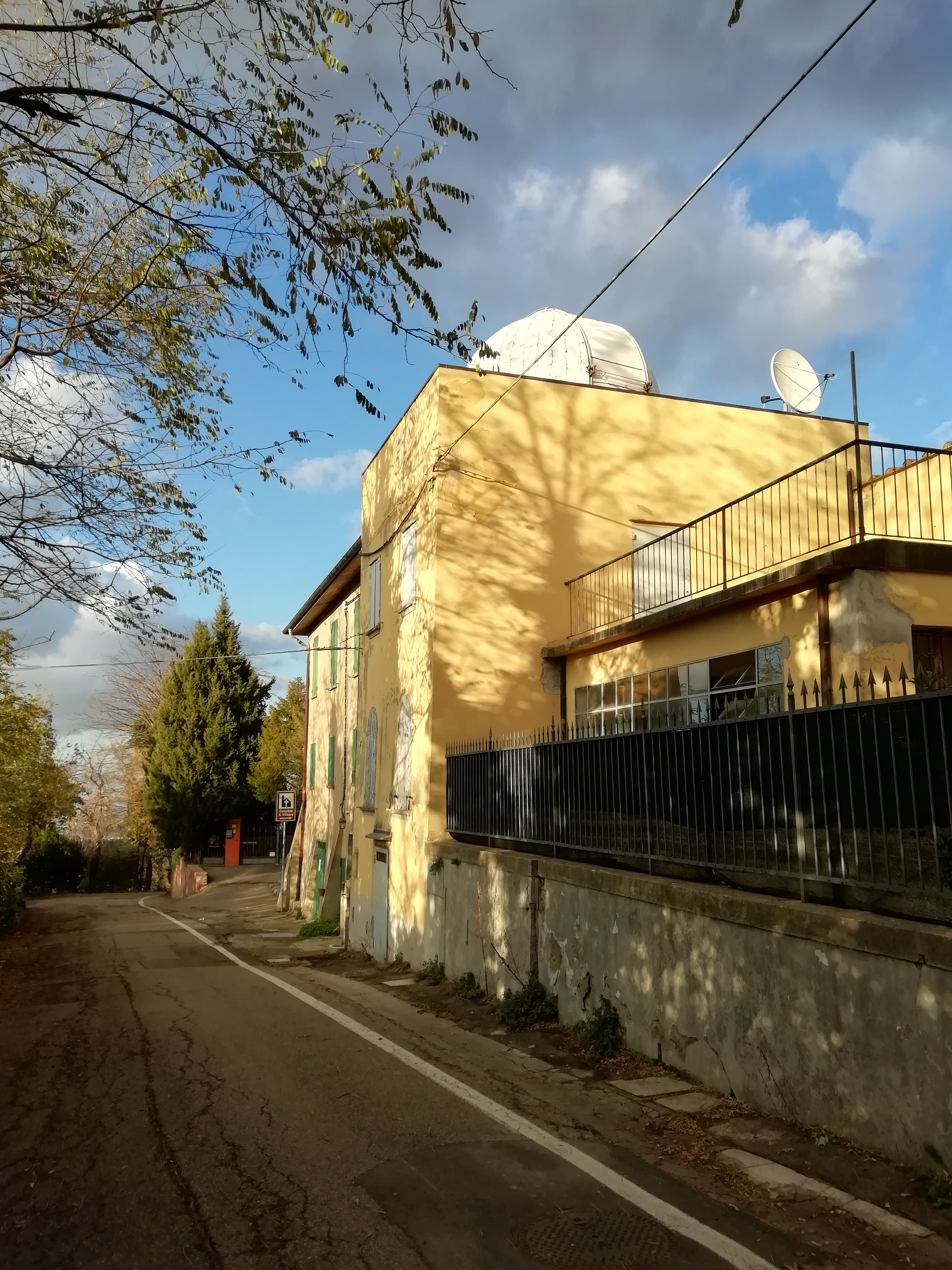
- Alternative names: Osservatorio San Vittore
- Observatory code: 552
- Location: Bologna, Metropolitan City of Bologna, Emilia-Romagna, Italy
- Coordinates: 44°28′06″N 11°20′30″E
- Altitude: 280 m (920 ft)
- Website: www.gizarastro.it/SanVittore.html
- Location of San Vittore Observatory
- Related media on Commons

The San Vittore Observatory (Italian: Osservatorio San Vittore, observation code: 552) was a private astronomical observatory in Bologna, Italy. It was active between 1969 and 2004.

== History ==
The San Vittore Observatory was a private astronomical observatory in Bologna, Italy. It was active between 1969 and 2004. Located 280 meters above sea level it was equipped with a newtonian telescope of 0.45 meters, with a 25/32/61.5 cm Schmidt camera mounted in parallel and a 15 cm f/10 guide refractor. The aforementioned instruments were built by Ciro Vacchi (1916-1999) and Giorgio Sassi (1918-2009) in the Optical-mechanical Workshop located on the ground floor of the observatory itself.

== Activities ==
In the years from 1975 to 1981 the San Vittore Observatory (Bologna) Italy participated to the International Planetary Patrol Program. It made numerous asteroid discoveries during 1980–2000. The observatory stopped operating in 2004.

The Minor Planet Center credits the observatory with the discovery of 99 asteroids, made between 1980 and 2000.

Minor planets discovered: 99
see § List of discovered minor planets

== List of discovered minor planets ==
2601 Bologna	8 December 1980	list
3344 Modena	15 May 1982	list
3744 Horn-d'Arturo	5 November 1983	list
3809 Amici	26 March 1984	list
3951 Zichichi	13 February 1986	list
4062 Schiaparelli	28 January 1989	list
4063 Euforbo	1 February 1989	list
4122 Ferrari	28 July 1986	list
4158 Santini	28 January 1989	list
4279 De Gasparis	19 November 1982	list
4540 Oriani	6 November 1988	list
4542 Mossotti	30 January 1989	list
4705 Secchi	13 February 1988	list
4742 Caliumi	26 November 1986	list
6241 Galante	4 October 1989	list
6598 Modugno	13 February 1988	list
6640 Falorni	24 February 1990	list
6746 Zagar	9 July 1994	list
6855 Armellini	29 January 1989	list
6862 Virgiliomarcon	11 April 1991	list

7491 Linzerag	23 September 1995	list
7516 Kranjc	18 June 1987	list
8006 Tacchini	22 August 1988	list
8081 Leopardi	17 February 1988	list
8155 Battaglini	17 August 1988	list
8266 Bertelli	1 October 1986	list
8269 Calandrelli	17 August 1988	list
8421 Montanari	2 December 1996	list
8472 Tarroni	12 October 1983	list
10376 Chiarini	16 May 1996	list
10413 Pansecchi	29 December 1997	list
10579 Diluca	20 July 1995	list
10722 Monari	1 October 1986	list
11100 Lai	22 May 1995	list
11120 Pancaldi	17 August 1996	list
11122 Eliscolombini	13 September 1996	list
11360 Formigine	24 February 1998	list
11981 Boncompagni	20 October 1995	list
12222 Perotto	19 November 1982	list
12407 Riccardi	23 September 1995	list

12579 Ceva	5 September 1999	list
13225 Manfredi	29 August 1997	list
14074 Riccati	11 July 1996	list
14361 Boscovich	17 February 1988	list
14846 Lampedusa	29 January 1989	list
15385 Dallolmo	25 September 1997	list
15388 Coelum	27 September 1997	list
16715 Trettenero	20 October 1995	list
16745 Zappa	9 August 1996	list
16906 Giovannisilva	18 February 1998	list
16930 Respighi	29 March 1998	list
18462 Riccò	26 August 1995	list
18505 Caravelli	9 August 1996	list
19523 Paolofrisi	18 December 1998	list
21687 Filopanti	11 September 1999	list
22263 Pignedoli	3 September 1980	list
23685 Toaldo	1 May 1997	list
24939 Chiminello	1 May 1997	list
27150 Annasante	16 December 1998	list
27341 Fabiomuzzi	10 February 2000	list

27967 Beppebianchi	1 October 1997	list
29568 Gobbi-Belcredi	25 March 1998	list
31015 Boccardi	16 February 1996	list
31028 Cerulli	18 April 1996	list
31134 Zurria	27 September 1997	list
31271 Nallino	25 March 1998	list
31431 Cabibbo	21 January 1999	list
35324 Orlandi	7 March 1997	list
35325 Claudiaguarnieri	7 March 1997	list
35326 Lucastrabla	7 March 1997	list
35346 Ivanoferri	1 May 1997	list
37749 Umbertobonori	12 January 1997	list
37840 Gramegna	20 February 1998	list
39854 Gabriopiola	20 February 1998	list
40447 Lorenzoni	11 September 1999	list
42593 Antoniazzi	1 May 1997	list
43890 Katiaottani	31 August 1995	list
44033 Michez	15 February 1998	list
48715 Balbinot	13 September 1996	list
49187 Zucchini	18 September 1998	list

49441 Scerbanenco	22 December 1998	list
52480 Enzomora	20 October 1995	list
52570 Lauraco	1 May 1997	list
52670 Alby	20 February 1998	list
55845 Marco	13 September 1996	list
58441 Thomastestoni	19 April 1996	list
65770 Leonardotestoni	28 May 1995	list
65852 Alle	7 March 1997	list
70210 Cesarelombardi	11 September 1999	list
79991 Umbertoleotti	19 March 1999	list
79996 Vittoria	23 March 1999	list
85564 Emilia	17 January 1998	list
90837 Raoulvalentini	18 November 1995	list
93061 Barbagallo	23 September 2000	list
96263 Lorettacavicchi	23 September 1995	list
118235 Federico	7 March 1997	list
(164676) 1997 EL_{7}	2 March 1997	list
(187805) 1999 RR_{32}	8 September 1999	list
(285617) 2000 RC_{8}	1 September 2000	list

== See also ==
- List of asteroid-discovering observatories
- List of astronomical observatories
- List of minor planet discoverers § Discovering dedicated institutions
