= Florina Pașcalău =

Romanian basketball player (born 1982)

Florina Paşcalău
CSM Târgovişte
- Position: Center
- League: Divizia A

Personal information
- Born: January 19, 1982 (age 44) Cluj-Napoca, Romania
- Listed height: 6 ft 4 in (1.93 m)

Career information
- Playing career: 1996–present

Career history
- 1996–1997: BC Cluj-Napoca
- 1997–2002: Livas Târgovişte
- 2002–2011: Priolo
- 2008: Seattle Storm
- 2011–2012: Taranto
- 2012–present: CSM Târgovişte
- Stats at Basketball Reference

Florina Paşcalău (born January 19, 1982, in Cluj-Napoca) is a Romanian professional female basketball player who plays for the Romanian club CSM Târgovişte in the Women's EuroLeague. As a member of the senior Romanian national basketball team, she competed at the 2007 EuroBasket. Paşcalău is the first Romanian who has played in the WNBA.
