= 2007 Four Continents Figure Skating Championships =

2007 Four Continents Championships
- Type: ISU Championship
- Date: February 7 – 10
- Season: 2006–07
- Location: Colorado Springs, USA
- Venue: World Arena

Champions
- Men's singles: (United States) Evan Lysacek
- Ladies' singles: (United States) Kimmie Meissner
- Pairs: (China) Shen Xue / Zhao Hongbo
- Ice dance: (Canada) Marie-France Dubreuil / Patrice Lauzon
- Previous: 2006 Four Continents Championships
- Next: 2008 Four Continents Championships

The 2007 Four Continents Figure Skating Championships was an international figure skating competition in the 2006–07 season. It was held at the World Arena in Colorado Springs, USA on February 7–10. Medals were awarded in the disciplines of men's singles, ladies' singles, pair skating, and ice dancing.

== Medals table ==
Rank	Nation	Gold	Silver	Bronze	Total
1	United States (USA)	2	2	2	6
2	Canada (CAN)	1	1	2	4
3	China (CHN)	1	1	0	2
Totals (3 entries)		4	4	4	12

== Results ==
=== Men ===
Rank	Name	Nation	Total points	SP		FS	
1	Evan Lysacek	United States	226.27	4	67.04	1	159.23
2	Jeffrey Buttle	Canada	223.96	1	77.72	2	146.24
3	Jeremy Abbott	United States	203.22	2	74.34	4	128.88
4	Ryan Bradley	United States	196.29	3	68.83	5	127.46
5	Christopher Mabee	Canada	188.41	8	58.58	3	129.83
6	Wu Jialiang	China	184.69	6	63.52	7	121.17
7	Noriyuki Kanzaki	Japan	181.58	7	62.34	8	119.24
8	Kensuke Nakaniwa	Japan	177.03	9	55.34	6	121.69
9	Emanuel Sandhu	Canada	173.67	5	64.98	10	108.69
10	Xu Ming	China	167.71	10	55.00	9	112.71
11	Yang Zhixue	China	154.57	12	52.98	11	101.59
12	Yasuharu Nanri	Japan	153.11	11	54.16	12	98.95
13	Sean Carlow	Australia	127.08	13	42.69	13	84.39
14	Joel Watson	New Zealand	112.04	14	40.56	14	71.48
15	Tristan Thode	New Zealand	106.61	15	39.10	15	67.51
16	Nicholas Fernandez	Australia	103.43	16	39.07	18	64.36
17	Luis Hernández	Mexico	101.35	19	34.76	16	66.59
18	Mathieu Wilson	New Zealand	94.59	21	28.44	17	66.15
19	Justin Pietersen	South Africa	94.12	18	34.89	20	59.23
20	Dean Timmins	Australia	93.74	20	31.56	19	62.18
21	Adrian Alvarado	Mexico	91.26	17	35.44	21	55.82

=== Ladies ===
Rank	Name	Nation	Total points	SP		FS	
1	Kimmie Meissner	United States	172.75	6	52.49	1	120.26
2	Emily Hughes	United States	166.60	2	55.34	2	111.26
3	Joannie Rochette	Canada	165.90	1	56.60	3	109.30
4	Aki Sawada	Japan	156.88	3	55.13	5	101.75
5	Alissa Czisny	United States	154.03	4	54.64	6	99.39
6	Yoshie Onda	Japan	152.61	7	49.38	4	103.23
7	Lesley Hawker	Canada	138.23	16	41.06	7	97.17
8	Xu Binshu	China	133.09	10	46.82	8	86.27
9	Liu Yan	China	126.69	5	53.34	15	73.35
10	Fang Dan	China	125.20	8	48.56	13	76.64
11	Shin Yea-ji	South Korea	123.44	14	42.21	9	81.23
12	Anastasia Gimazetdinova	Uzbekistan	123.39	11	46.15	12	77.24
13	Kim Na-young	South Korea	122.28	13	43.28	10	79.00
14	Kim Chae-hwa	South Korea	121.11	9	46.96	14	74.15
15	Cynthia Phaneuf	Canada	120.01	15	42.14	11	77.87
16	Joanne Carter	Australia	108.40	18	38.35	16	70.05
17	Ana Cecilia Cantu	Mexico	100.64	17	39.19	20	61.45
18	Emily Naphtal	Mexico	96.26	21	31.66	17	64.60
19	Jocelyn Ho	Chinese Taipei	95.56	20	33.11	19	62.45
20	Ami Parekh	India	94.56	22	30.40	18	64.16
21	Phoebe Di Tommaso	Australia	92.92	19	34.05	22	58.87
22	Michelle Cantu	Mexico	90.63	23	29.66	21	60.97
23	Abigail Pietersen	South Africa	74.30	24	25.21	23	49.09
WD	Fumie Suguri	Japan		12	46.09		
Free Skating Not Reached
25	Kristine Y. Lee	Hong Kong		25	23.06		
26	Stephanie Gardner	Brazil		26	18.69		

=== Pairs ===
Jessica Dubé / Bryce Davison did not complete their free skating and so automatically withdrew. During a side-by-side camel spin, the two drifted too close to each other, and Davison's blade hit Dubé in the face. She was immediately taken to the hospital and underwent surgery to repair the damage. Dubé later made a complete recovery and the two were able to compete at the 2007 World Championships.

Rank	Name	Nation	Total points	SP		FS	
1	Shen Xue / Zhao Hongbo	China	203.05	1	69.29	1	133.76
2	Pang Qing / Tong Jian	China	185.33	2	65.80	2	119.53
3	Rena Inoue / John Baldwin	United States	175.48	3	61.73	3	113.75
4	Valérie Marcoux / Craig Buntin	Canada	162.79	4	60.43	5	102.36
5	Brooke Castile / Benjamin Okolski	United States	160.04	7	55.12	4	104.92
6	Naomi Nari Nam / Themistocles Leftheris	United States	153.39	6	56.08	6	97.31
7	Anabelle Langlois / Cody Hay	Canada	152.26	5	56.15	7	96.11
8	Marina Aganina / Artem Knyazev	Uzbekistan	101.41	9	36.08	8	65.33
WD	Jessica Dubé / Bryce Davison	Canada		8	53.39		

=== Ice dancing ===
Rank	Name	Nation	Total points	CD		OD		FD	
1	Marie-France Dubreuil / Patrice Lauzon	Canada	198.59	1	38.54	2	59.32	1	100.73
2	Tanith Belbin / Ben Agosto	United States	196.98	2	37.72	1	60.45	2	98.81
3	Tessa Virtue / Scott Moir	Canada	184.89	4	33.41	3	57.49	3	93.99
4	Meryl Davis / Charlie White	United States	179.69	3	33.68	4	54.66	4	91.35
5	Kim Navarro / Brent Bommentre	United States	157.82	6	29.37	5	48.44	5	80.01
6	Lauren Senft / Leif Gislason	Canada	149.39	5	29.70	6	46.34	7	73.35
7	Cathy Reed / Chris Reed	Japan	144.17	7	27.42	9	40.88	6	75.87
8	Huang Xintong / Zheng Xun	China	137.07	8	24.61	7	41.71	8	70.75
9	Yu Xiaoyang / Wang Chen	China	131.28	10	22.47	8	41.56	9	67.25
10	Olga Akimova / Alexander Shakalov	Uzbekistan	126.71	9	22.91	10	37.44	10	66.36
11	Laura Munana / Luke Munana	Mexico	115.46	11	21.07	11	36.35	11	58.04
12	Maria Borounov / Evgeni Borounov	Australia	83.52	12	12.95	12	24.15	12	46.42
