= Jelena Stanković =

Serbian basketball player

Personal information
- Born: 28 March 1993 (age 33) Belgrade, FR Yugoslavia
- Listed height: 1.80 m (5 ft 11 in)

Career information
- Playing career: 2009–2014
- Position: Guard

Career history
- 2009–2011: Čelarevo
- 2011–2013: Voždovac
- 2013: Šabac
- 2013–2014: Crvena zvezda
- 2014: Partizan

Jelena Stanković (Serbian Cyrillic: Јелена Станковић, born 28 March 1993) is a former Serbian women's basketball player.
