= Zoran Cvetanović (basketball) =

Serbian basketball coach

Al-Ahli Benghazi
- Position: Head coach
- League: Libyan Division I Basketball League

Personal information
- Born: June 13, 1958 (age 68) Kragujevac, PR Serbia, FPR Yugoslavia
- Coaching career: 1993–present

Career history

Coaching
- 1993–1996: ŽKK Radnički Kragujevac (youth)
- 1996–2000: ŽKK Radnički Kragujevac
- 2000–2002: Zastava
- 2003–2006: Ibon Nikšić
- 2006–2008: Radnički 034 Group
- 2009–2010: Primorje
- 2010–2011: Niš
- 2011–2013: Ryazan
- 2013–2020: SK MVP (youth)
- 2020–2021: Radnički 1950
- 2021–present: Al-Ahli Benghazi

Career highlights
- Serbian League Cup winner (2007)

Zoran Cvetanović (Serbian Cyrillic: Зоран Цветановић, born June 13, 1958) is a Serbian professional basketball coach.

== Coaching career ==
Cvetanović began his coaching career with the Radnički women's team in Kragujevac. In 1993, he became the coach for youth teams. In 1996 he moved to senior squad as the head coach. He also had two stints with men's teams from Kragujevac – Zastava and Radnički 034 Group.

Cvetanović spent a part of his coaching career working abroad. He had two stints in Montenegro with Ibon Nikšić and Herceg Novi-based Primorje. In 2011, he was named as a head coach for Ryazan of the Russian Super League 1.

Since 2013, Cvetanović has been working with youth selections of SK MVP in Kragujevac.

In March 2021, Cvetanović was hired as the new head coach for Al-Ahli Benghazi of the Libyan Division I Basketball League.
