= Gordana Bogojević =

Yugoslavian and Serbian basketball player

Personal information
- Born: 22 May 1974 Zagreb, SFR Yugoslavia
- Died: 5 December 2009 (aged 35) Belgrade, Serbia
- Listed height: 1.73 m (5 ft 8 in)
- Listed weight: 60 kg (132 lb)

Career information
- Playing career: 1989–2007
- Position: Power forward

Career history
- 1989: Radnički Kragujevac
- 1989–1996: Crvena zvezda
- 1996–1997: Profi D Pančevo
- 1997–1999: Hemofarm
- 1999–2000: BK Brno
- 2000–2001: ASDG Comense 1872
- 2001–2002: MBK Ružomberok
- 2002–2005: Sopron
- 2005–2006: Lotos Gdynia
- 2006: PF Schio
- 2007: Ros Casares Valencia

Gordana Bogojević, married Kovačević, (22 May 1974 – 5 December 2009) was a former Yugoslavian and Serbian female basketball player and former member of basketball national team of FR Yugoslavia.
