= Libertas Trogylos Basket =

Italian women's basketball club

GS Libertas Trogylos
- Leagues: Serie A1
- Founded: 1970
- Arena: PalaAcer
- Location: Priolo Gargallo, Italy
- Team colors: Green and white
- President: Paolo Giuliano
- Head coach: Santino Coppa
- Website: trogylos.net
Home	Away

Gruppo Sportivo Libertas Trogylos Basket is an Italian women's basketball club from Priolo Gargallo. Founded in 1970, it reached the Serie A1 in 1986, where it played until its withdrawal in 2014.

Libertas Trogylos won the 1989 national championship and the 1990 European Cup, beating CSKA Moscow in the final. It also reached the 1992 Ronchetti Cup's final, lost to AS Vicenza. In 2000 the team won its second national title, marking its debut in the new Euroleague. Its best result since was a silver medal in 2006, while most recently it was 10th in the 2012 championship with a 5–17 record.

== Titles ==
- European Cup
  - 1990
- Serie A
  - 1989, 2000

== Players ==
=== 2011-12 Roster ===
- (1.97) (Italy) Valentina Fabbri
- (1.93) (Israel) Jennifer Fleischer
- (1.91) (United States) Katryna Gaither
- (1.88) (United States) Michelle Maslowski
- (1.85) (Italy) Sivia Favento
- (1.82) (Italy) Tania Bertan
- (1.81) (Serbia) Tanja Ćirov
- (1.81) (Cuba) Tania Seino
- (1.80) (Belgium) Romina Ciappina
- (1.78) (Italy) Susana Bonfiglio
- (1.77) (Italy) Elena Bestagno
- (1.74) (Italy) Elisa Buccianti
- (1.72) (Italy) Ilaria Milazzo

=== 2013-14 Roster ===
- (2.02) (Bulgaria) Aleksandra Delcheva

== Notable former players ==
- (Finland) Michaela Moua
- (Romania) Florina Pașcalău
- (Bulgaria) Polina Tzekova

== See also ==
- National titles won by Sicilian teams

== Bibliography ==
- Quartarone, Roberto (2021). Abbiamo sconfitto l'Armata Rossa! (in Italian). Basket Catanese. ISBN 9798701135862.
