= Erik (HBC vessel) =

Scottish steamship

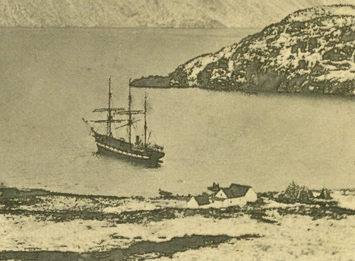

History

United Kingdom
- Name: Erik
- Owner: J. W. Baird & Co., West Hartlepool (Sunderland)
- Builder: Stephen & Sons Ltd. - Alexander Stephen, Glasgow
- Yard number: 32
- Way number: 52665
- Launched: 1895
- Out of service: 25 August 1918
- Fate: Shelled and sunk 1918

General characteristics
- Type: Whaler
- Tonnage: 583
- Propulsion: steam

Erik (alternately Eric) was a propeller driven steamship, built in the Dundee, Scotland, for service in northern waters. She was launched in 1865, and worked as a whaling ship off Labrador, until her purchase by the Hudson's Bay Company. From 1888 to 1900 she provided transport to and from London, England, to Labrador and Hudson's Bay. She was the first steam powered vessel to enter Hudson's Bay.

She ran aground in Hudson's Bay in 1900. She was refloated in 1901, and returned to the UK, where she was sold, and then turned to Labrador's seal fishery. She served as a supply vessel for Robert E. Peary's exploration voyages in 1902 and 1906.

She was captured, and sunk, by the Imperial German Navy submarine SM U-156, in 1918.
