= 3951 Zichichi =

Main-belt asteroid

Discovery
- Discovered by: San Vittore Obs.
- Discovery site: San Vittore Obs.
- Discovery date: 13 February 1986

Designations
- Named after: Antonino Zichichi (Italian nuclear physicist)
- Alternative designations: 1986 CK_{1} · 1938 UG; 1976 JG_{9} · 1979 DR; 1981 UJ_{12} · 1986 AU_{2}
- Minor planet category: main-belt · Flora

Orbital characteristics
- Epoch 4 September 2017 (JD 2458000.5)
- Uncertainty parameter 0
- Observation arc: 40.56 yr (14,816 days)
- Aphelion: 2.7469 AU
- Perihelion: 1.9320 AU
- Semi-major axis: 2.3394 AU
- Eccentricity: 0.1742
- Orbital period (sidereal): 3.58 yr (1,307 days)
- Mean anomaly: 355.00°
- Mean motion: 0° 16^{m} 31.44^{s} / day
- Inclination: 5.4133°
- Longitude of ascending node: 270.04°
- Argument of perihelion: 151.72°
- Known satellites: 1

Physical characteristics
- Dimensions: 6.720±0.213
- Synodic rotation period: 3.39423±0.00007 h
- Geometric albedo: 0.325±0.050
- Spectral type: S
- Absolute magnitude (H): 12.8

3951 Zichichi, provisional designation 1986 CK_{1}, is a stony Florian asteroid and binary system from the inner regions of the asteroid belt, approximately 7 kilometers in diameter. It was discovered on 12 February 1986, by staff members at the San Vittore Observatory near Bologna, Italy, and named after physicist Antonino Zichichi.

== Orbit and classification ==
Zichichi is a S-type asteroid and member of the Flora family, one of the largest collisional populations of stony asteroids in the main-belt. It orbits the Sun in the inner main-belt at a distance of 1.9–2.7 AU once every 3 years and 7 months (1,307 days). Its orbit has an eccentricity of 0.17 and an inclination of 5° with respect to the ecliptic.

== Physical characteristics ==
A minor-planet moon was discovered orbiting at a distance of 16 km in 2006, but not announced until 2011.

== Naming ==
This minor planet was named after Italian nuclear physicist Antonino Zichichi. The approved naming citation was published by the Minor Planet Center on 20 May 1989 (M.P.C. 14634).
