= Jelena Vučetić =

Montenegrin Serb basketball player

Personal information
- Born: 14 September 1993 (age 33) Kotor, FR Yugoslavia
- Listed height: 5 ft 10 in (1.78 m)

Career information
- Playing career: 2008–present
- Position: Point guard / shooting guard
- Number: 23

Career history
- 2008–2009: Herceg Novi
- 2009–2010: Antivari Bar
- 2010–2011: Herceg Novi
- 2012–2013: Palanka 2012
- 2013–2014: ŽKK Partizan
- 2014–2015: ŽKK Vojvodina
- 2015–2016: PINKK-Pécsi 424
- 2016–2018: Kazanochka Kazan
- 2018-2019: ŽKK Budućnost Bemax
- 2019-2020: ACS Sepsi SIC
- 2020-2022: Herner TC
- 2022-2023: Barça CBS
- 2023: AE Sedis Bàsquet
- 2023-present: Royal Castors Braine

Career highlights
- Serbian Basketball Cup (2015); Serbian Basketball Cup MVP (2015)

Jelena Vučetić (born 14 September 1993) is a Montenegrin professional basketball player and a member of the Montenegro women's national basketball team. She made her national team debut in 2014. In 2015, she was named the MVP of the Serbian Basketball Cup after scoring 39 points for ŽKK Vojvodina in the cup final win against ŽKK Radivoj Korać.

She split the 2022–2023 season with Barça CBS and Cadi La Seu in the Spanish Liga Femenina de Baloncesto.

== Honours ==
Vojvodina

- National Cup of Serbia (1): 2014–15
