= KK Jagodina =

Basketball club in Jagodina, Serbia

- Nickname: Ćurani (The turkeys)
- Leagues: First Regional League
- Founded: 1965; 60 years ago
- History: OKK Svetozarevo (1965–1977); KK Jagodina (1977–present)
- Arena: JASSA Sports Center (capacity: 2,600)
- Location: Jagodina, Serbia
- Team colors: Blue and White
Home	Away

Košarkaški klub Jagodina (Serbian Cyrillic: Кошаркашки клуб Јагодина), commonly referred to as KK Jagodina, is a men's professional basketball club based in Jagodina, Serbia. The club currently participates in the First Regional Basketball League.

== History ==
The club was founded in 1965 under the name of OKK Svetozarevo, but they failed to complete the first competitive season due to financial problems. In 1977, the club changed its name to KK Jagodina. In 1982, there was a separation of the women's and men's teams and the formation of separate clubs.

The first major success of the club was the entry into the First B Federal League of Yugoslavia in the early 1980s (1981–82 season). After that years, the club competed in lower-tier leagues for some years. In 2002, entered the First B League of Serbia and Montenegro. In the 2005–06 season, Jagodina took the last place and dropped out of the First B League. In the Serbian First Regional League, the third ranking, has been kept for two seasons, and since the 2008–09 season they are back to First B League of Serbia.

In the 2011–12 season, Jagodina won the First B League of Serbia and for the first time in its history was placed in the first ranking of the competition, the Basketball League of Serbia. In their debut season in first-tier league, Jagodina took the last place and dropped in the lower ranking. However, they went back to the first league for the 2014–15 season. Same as the first time, Jagodina dropped out from the first league in the end of the season. In 2016–17 season, they dropped out of the second league to the First Regional League.

=== Seasons in the Basketball League of Serbia ===
- 2012–13 season
- 2014–15 season
- 2015–16 season

== Trophies and awards ==
=== Trophies ===
- Second League of Serbia (2nd-tier)
  - Winners (2): 2011–12, 2013–14

== See also ==
- ŽKK Jagodina 2001
