= Erich Albrecht (footballer) =

German footballer

Personal information
- Date of birth: 31 March 1889
- Place of birth: Leipzig, Germany
- Date of death: 30 November 1949 (aged 60)
- Position: Forward

Senior career*
Years	Team	Apps	(Gls)
1906–1914	Wacker Leipzig		

International career
1909	Germany	1	(0)
- * Club domestic league appearances and goals

Erich Albrecht (31 March 1889 – 30 November 1949) was a German international footballer.
