= Antonino Zichichi =

Italian physicist (1929–2026)

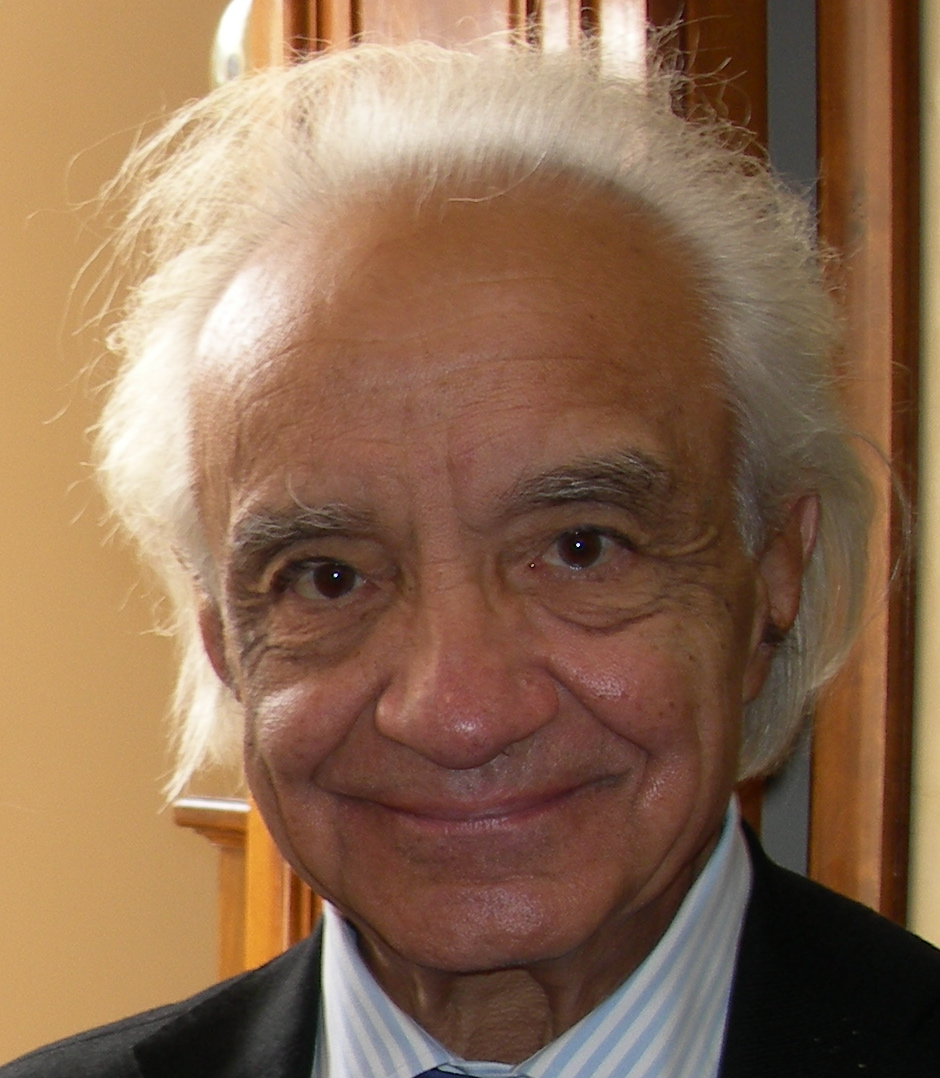
- Born: 15 October 1929
- Died: 9 February 2026 (aged 96)

Antonino Zichichi (Italian pronunciation: [antoˈniːno dziˈkiːki]; 15 October 1929 – 9 February 2026) was an Italian physicist who worked in the field of nuclear physics. He served as President of the World Federation of Scientists and as a professor at the University of Bologna.

== Life and career ==
Zichichi was born in Trapani, Sicily on 15 October 1929. After graduating from the Ximenes classical high school in Trapani, he obtained a degree in physics from the University of Palermo.

He collaborated on several discoveries in the field of sub-nuclear physics and worked in numerous research laboratories such as Fermilab in Chicago and CERN in Geneva, where in 1965 he led the research group that first observed the antideuteron, simultaneously with an American team from the Alternating Gradient Synchrotron at Brookhaven National Laboratory.

In 1963, he founded the Centro Ettore Majorana of Erice, dedicated to scientific culture. The Ettore Majorana centre sponsors the International School of Subnuclear Physics, where Zichichi served as director. He was president of the Istituto Nazionale di Fisica Nucleare from 1977 up to 1982, and in 1980 he strongly backed the creation of the Laboratori Nazionali del Gran Sasso. From 1978 until 1980, he served as President of the European Physical Society.

In 1979, during the election of the new Director-General of CERN, pressure from Italy in his favour caused a clear rift between Italy and other Member States, and in the end, with 12 votes against, Zichichi's candidacy was rejected in favour of the German candidate Herwig Schopper. In 1986, he became director of World Lab, an association that supports scientific projects in third world countries, founded in 1973 by Isidor Isaac Rabi and Zichichi himself.

Zichichi was an emeritus professor of physics at the University of Bologna. He was president of the World Federation of Scientists, an organization concerned with the fight against planetary emergencies. In 1982, with P. A. M. Dirac and Pyotr Kapitsa, he drafted the Erice statement. Zichichi gave the opening talk at the four-day international symposium Subnuclear Physics: Past, Present and Future held in 2011 in Vatican City. Zichichi talked with Pope John Paul II about the responsibility of the Roman Catholic Church in the case of Galileo Galilei, playing a role in the public request of forgiveness issued by the Pope in October 1992.

He was repeatedly critical of astrology and of the theory of evolution, which he considered to lack sufficient scientific evidence and a mathematical model capable of describing phenomena and making future predictions of events not yet known. Zichichi died on 9 February 2026, at the age of 96.

== Honours and assignments ==
- Knight Grand Cross of the Order of Merit of the Italian Republic
- Order of Merit of the Italian Republic
- Grand Officer of the Order of Merit of the Italian Republic
- President of European Physical Society (1978–1980)
- President of Italian National Institute of Nuclear Physics (1977–1982)
- President of the NATO Commission for Technologies for Disarmament
- Representative of EEC in the Scientific Committee of the International Centre for Science and Technology in Moscow
- President of the Historical Museum of Physics and the Research Centre "E. Fermi"
- Laurea Honoris Causa from Peking University, Buenos Aires, Malta, Bucharest, Arizona, Torino
- Member of the Academy of Sciences of the Republic of Ukraine
- Member of the Academy of Sciences of Georgia
- Member of Pontifical Academy of Sciences
- Pope Benedict XV's member of the Accademia delle scienze dell'Istituto di Bologna
- Fellow, The World Academy of Sciences
- Order of Merit of the Republic of Poland
- Order of Merit of the Federal Republic of Germany
- Enrico Fermi Award (Italian Physical Society)
- Asteroid 3951 Zichichi is named after Zichichi.

== Publications ==
- L'infinito, Lausanne, G. Galilei, 1988; Milano, Rizzoli, 1994 ISBN 8817138339; Milano, Nuova Pratiche Editrice, 1998.
- Scienza ed emergenze planetarie. Il paradosso dell'era moderna, Milano, Rizzoli, 1993. ISBN 8817842869
- Perché io credo in Colui che ha fatto il mondo, Milano, Il Saggiatore, 1999, ISBN 88-428-0714-1
- L'irresistibile fascino del Tempo. Dalla resurrezione di Cristo all'universo subnucleare, Milano, Il Saggiatore, 2000, ISBN 88-515-2004-6
- Subnuclear Physics. The first 50 years highlights from Erice to ELN, Singapore, World Scientific, 2000.
- Galilei divin uomo, Milano, Il Saggiatore, 2001, ISBN 88-428-0943-8
- Il vero e il falso. Passeggiando tra le stelle e a casa nostra, Milano, Il Saggiatore, 2003, ISBN 88-428-1078-9
- Galilei. Dall'Ipse Dixit al processo di oggi. 100 risposte, Milano, Il Saggiatore, 2004, ISBN 88-428-1174-2
- Tra Fede e Scienza. Da Giovanni Paolo II a Benedetto XVI, Milano, Il Saggiatore, 2005, ISBN 88-428-1310-9
- Creativity in Science: 6th International Zermatt Symposium Creativity in Economics, Arts and Science, Zermatt, Switzerland, 12-16 January 1996, World Scientific, 1999; ISBN 9810240457
- Giovanni Paolo II. Il Papa Amico della Scienza, Marco Tropea Editore, 2011, ISBN 88-558-0180-5
- Zichichi, A.,"Bruno Pontecorvo and his vision"; the content of the paper is a part of the special volume published by the Italian Physical Society (2013) to celebrate the Hundredth Anniversary of Bruno Pontecorvo.

== See also ==
- Erice
- Galileo Galilei
