= Adrijana Knežević =

Serbian basketball player

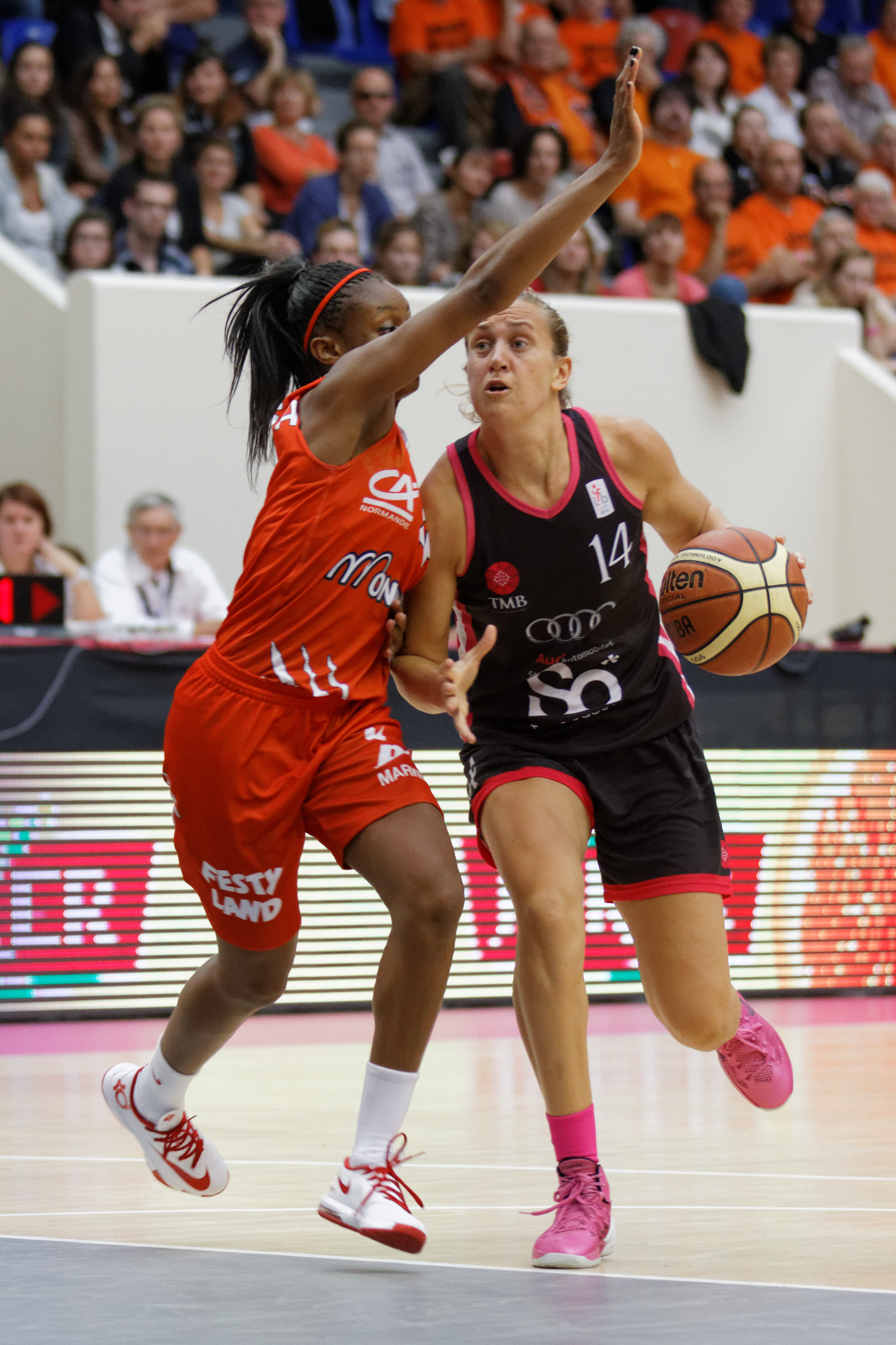
- Adrijana Knežević (right) in Toulouse Métropole Basket in 2013

No. 14 – Girne Üniversitesi
- Position: Small forward

Personal information
- Born: 20 January 1987 (age 39) Senta, SFR Yugoslavia
- Listed height: 1.80 m (5 ft 11 in)

Career information
- WNBA draft: 2009: undrafted
- Playing career: 2003–present

Career history
- 2003–2005: Novi Beograd
- 2005–2006: Ros Casares Valencia
- 2006–2007: CB Avenida
- 2007–2008: Club Atletico Faenza Pallacanestro
- 2008–2009: CB Islas Canarias
- 2009–2010: Soller Joventud Mariana
- 2011: ESB Villeneuve-d'Ascq
- 2011–2012: Lotos Gdynia
- 2012–2013: Toulouse Métropole Basket
- 2013–2014: Spartak Subotica
- 2014: Šumadija Kragujevac
- 2014–2015: Campus Promete
- 2015–2016: Uni Girona
- 2016–present: Girne Üniversitesi
Medals
Women's basketball
Representing Serbia
European U20 Championship
Silver medal – second place	2007 Bulgaria	Team
World U19 Championship
Silver medal – second place	2005 Tunisia	Team
European U18 Championship
Gold medal – first place	2005 Hungary	Team
European U16 Championship
Gold medal – first place	2003 Turkey	Team

Adrijana Knežević (Serbian Cyrillic: Адријана Кнежевић; born 20 January 1987) is a Serbian professional basketball player for Club Deportivo Promete of La Liga Feminina.
