= Stephanie Gardner =

Brazilian-American figure skater (born 1989)

Personal information
- Born: November 11, 1989 (age 36)
- Home town: Orange County, California, U.S.

Figure skating career
- Country: Brazil (2006–2007); United States (till 2005)
- Coach: Sherri Torando

Stephanie Gardner (born November 11, 1989) is a Brazilian-American retired figure skater. She is the first skater to represent Brazil in at an ISU Championship, which she did at the 2007 Four Continents Championships. She was also the winner of the second season of Brazilian's version of Dancing on Ice.

== Personal life ==
Gardner's father is American while her mother's Brazilian, which gives her double citizenship. She learned to speak Portuguese when she was 13 from watching Brazilian telenovelas on Globo International.

== Carreira ==
Stephanie Gardner began skating at nine years old at Costa Mesa, California, after watching Tara Lipinski win gold at the Nagano Olympic Games in 1998. Until 2004, she used to compete at the USFS domestic circuit in ladies' singles, but in 2005 she decided to change to synchronized skating, when she began competing for the ICE'Kateers team, with whom she got 4th place at the Intermediate level US Nationals.

In 2006, she went back to singles after finding out there'd be a national competition for Brazilian skaters in São Paulo and, along with her coaches, developed a set of programs more adjusted for the rink she'd skate there, which was eight times smaller than the Olympic sized ones. Gardner won the competition, which caught the attention of a Domingão do Faustão producer who invited her to be one of the skaters at the Dancing on Ice segment. At only 16 years old then, Gardner cancelled her high school enrollment to spend a semester at Rio de Janeiro. Her performance at the reality show was enough to make the CBDG directors aware of her skill and so she was invited to be the first ever athlete to represent Brazil in a ISU sanctioned championship at 2007 Four Continents Championships, in which she finished at 26th. The skater reviewed her lack of good results as a consequence of not training for the singles category for three years, and the Four Continents being her first ever senior-level competition.

Gardner had stumbled on the possibility of changing categories once again, this time to ice dance, and focusing on the 2010 Olympics, with either Flávio Francisco or Diego Dores, both Brazilian-born skaters, as her partner, but the lack of adequate structure in Brazil and the logistical issues of moving the potential partners to California made her decide to retire.

== Programs ==
Season	Short program	Free skating
2006-2007	The Girl from Ipanema by Antônio Carlos Jobim	Carioca - Copacabana performed by Erich Kunzel and Orchestra

== Competitive highlights ==
Event	2006–2007
Four Continents Championships	26th
