= Vesna Despotović =

Serbian basketball player and coach

Personal information
- Born: 18 April 1961 (age 65) Kragujevac, PR Serbia, FPR Yugoslavia
- Listed height: 1.85 m (6 ft 1 in)
- Listed weight: 75 kg (165 lb)

Career information
- Playing career: 1973–1996
- Position: Center
- Coaching career: 2011–present

Career history

Playing
- 1973–1996: Radnički Kragujevac

Coaching
- 2012–2016: Radnički Kragujevac
- 2016–present: Radnički 2016
Medals
Women's basketball
Representing Yugoslavia
Olympic Games
Bronze medal – third place	1980 Moskva	Team competition
EuroBasket
Bronze medal – third place	1980 Banja Luka	Team competition

Vesna Despotović (Весна Деспотовић, born 18 April 1961) is a Serbian basketball coach and former basketball player who competed for Yugoslavia in the 1980 Summer Olympics.
