= Aleksandra Delcheva =

Bulgarian volleyball and basketball player

Personal information
- Born: April 11, 1987 (age 39)
- Height: 2.02 m (6 ft 8 in)

Volleyball information
- Position: Center (basketball)

Career
| Years | Teams |
|---|---|
| 2009-2012 | WBC Slavia Sofia |
| 2012-2013 | DSK Basketball Karlin |
| 2013-2014 | Libertas Trogylos Basket |
| 2014-2015 | RS Samokov |
| 2015-2016 | Haskovo 2012 |

National team
| 2011- | Bulgaria (basketball) |

Aleksandra Delcheva (Bulgarian: Александра Делчева, born April 11, 1987) is a Bulgarian volleyball and basketball player, playing as a center.

Delcheva started her basketball career with the club WBC Slavia Sofia in Hungary and played there between 2009 and 2012 (68 matches, making 532 points). In her last season, 2011–12, she played at Slavia (Division A), played 24 games and had 8.5ppg and 7.3rpg. After the season she moved to the Czech Republic to play a season with DSK Basketball Karlin (25 matches, making 82 points). A year later she moved to Italy and played with Libertas Trogylos Basket in the Italian league (16 matches, making 66 points). In 13 A1 games she averaged 4.5ppg and 7.4rpg. Delcheva was selected to Italian League All-Star Game in 2014.

Delcheva has represented Bulgaria on the Bulgaria women's national basketball team since 2011, including the EuroBasket Women 2013 qualification.
