= Petar Erić =

Petar Erić (Serbian: Петар Ерић; c. 1780-after 1821) was one of the many revolutionaries who joined Karađorđe to liberate Serbia from Turkish thraldom. He also participated in the Second Serbian Uprising in 1815.

He was born in the village of Zvečke in Serbia in 1780. During the battles of the First Serbian Uprising, he attained the titles of buljubaša and then captain in 1813. He was a close collaborator of Matija Nenadović. He was one of the many warriors who didn't leave Serbia and immediately joined the ranks of Miloš Obrenović who initiated the second revolt against the Ottoman Empire.

== Literature ==
- Lazar Arsenijević Batalaka, Istorija srpskog ustanka (Belgrade, 1898)
- Konstantin N. Nenadović, Život i dela velikog Đorđa Petrovića Kara Đorđa Vrhovnog Vožda... (Vienna, 1884)
