= Erice statement =

1982 declaration of freedom and scientific responsibility for peace and ethics

The Erice statement is a declaration on 24 August, 1982 at Erice, Sicily by Paul Dirac, Piotr Kapitza, and Antonino Zichichi asking for freedom of expression for scientists as well as for nuclear disarmament. It has been signed by over 90,000 scientists as well as numerous world leaders including Mikhail Gorbachev, Ronald Reagan and Deng Xiaoping.

== Summary ==
The statement was written in 1982, following several wars of the 20th century that had either necessitated or made use of developments in science and technology to cause greater death tolls and fatalities. It acknowledged that humanity had acquired the power to effectively cause its own extinction and alter the planet irreversibly through its actions.

It countered that such an event was not an unavoidable consequence of scientific development, and stated that a new trend in scientific research had to develop to prevent humanity from progressing towards another arms race and third world war.

The statement therefore makes the following proposals:

- To not punish scientists who devote their full time and effort to study the basic and natural sciences.
- To minimise the restrictions surrounding the flow of information and people across governments.
- To reduce secrecy in matters concerning defence technology.
- To prevent the acquisition of nuclear weapons by any additional nations or non-national groups.
- For countries with nuclear arsenals to reduce their stockpiles.
- For powerful governments to reduce the instability of non-nuclear powers.
- To ban all kinds of nuclear testing for war technology.
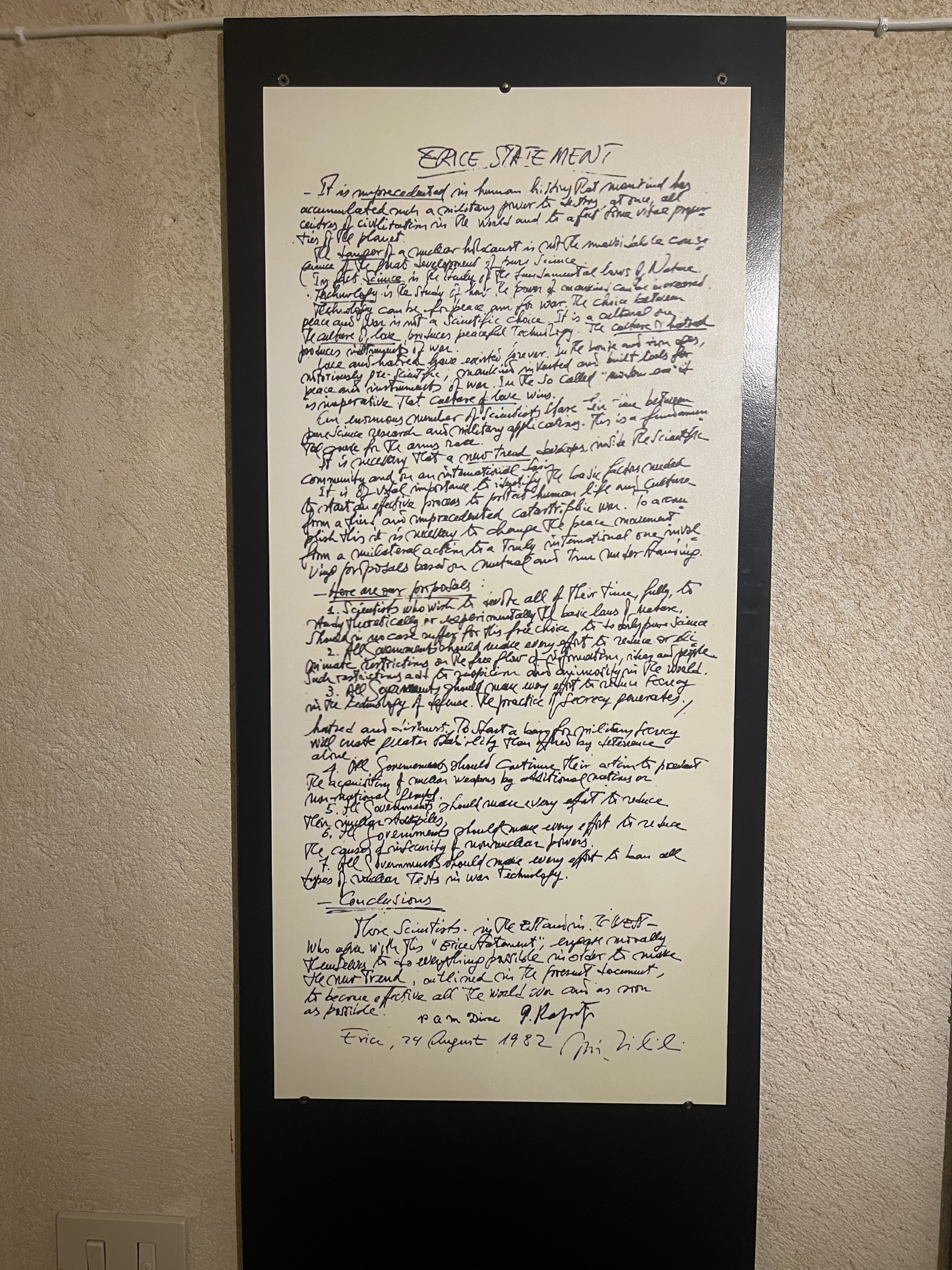
Erice Statement
