= Jovana Pašić =

Montenegrin basketball player

No. 13 – Hapoel Kfar saba
- Position: Small forward / power forward
- League: Israeli League

Personal information
- Born: 12 May 1992 (age 34) Cetinje, Montenegro, FR Yugoslavia
- Listed height: 6 ft 0 in (1.83 m)

Career information
- WNBA draft: 2014: undrafted

Career history
- Herceg Novi
- Antivari Bar
- Herceg Novi
- 2012–2013: Palanka 2012
- 2013–2014: Partizan
- 2014–2016: Vojvodina
- 2016: Radivoj Korać
- 2016–2017: ICIM Arad
- 2018–2023: ACS Sepsi-SIC
- 2023–2024: ASA Jerusalem
- 2024–present: Hapoel Kfar saba
Medals
Women's basketball
Representing Montenegro
Games of the Small States of Europe
Gold medal – first place	2025 Andorra	Team

Jovana Pašić (born 12 May 1992) is a Montenegrin basketball player. She spent much of her life in Montenegro, but decided to continue her career in France.

The Montenegrin national team player Jovana Pašić started her career in Herceg Novi, played for Antivari, Palanka, Partizan, Vojvodina, Radivoj Korać, and then there was a period in Romania. After the season in Arad, she spent four years in Sepsi, where she won everything she could win, and she also shone in the Eurocup.

== Honours ==
Vojvodina

- National Cup of Serbia (1): 2014–15

Radivoj Korać

- First League of Serbia (1): 2015–16
