= ŽKK Srbobran =

Serbian basketball team

- Leagues: Serbian League
- Founded: 2005
- Arena: SC Srbobran (capacity: 500)
- Location: Srbobran, Serbia
- Team colors: Red and White
- President: (Serbia) ??
- Head coach: (Serbia) Slobodan Subić

Ženski košarkaški klub Srbobran (Serbian Cyrillic: Женски кошаркашки клуб Србобран) is a Serbian women's basketball team from Srbobran, Serbia. The club currently plays in Women's Serbian League.

== History ==
Ženski košarkaški klub Srbobran was founded 29 January 2005, in 2011 was qualified for the First B league, and a year later the team was placed in the First A league of Serbia when a permanent member of the highest ranks of competition in Serbia. In the 2013–14 season he played in MŽRKL due to cancellation ŽKK Mladi Krajišnik from Banja Luka. Since its founding ŽKK Srbobran took part in competitions for all younger age categories.

== Arena ==
Sports hall in Srbobran a multi-purpose type which includes: small hall, big hall, gym, bowling, chess hall and restaurant, is also suitable to reflect different aspects of events (festivals, fairs, concerts ...).

== Notable former players ==
- Jovana Karakašević
- Dara Kovačević
