= ŽKK Stara Pazova =

Serbian basketball team

- Leagues: Serbian League
- Arena: Arena Park Stara Pazova (capacity: 300)
- Location: Stara Pazova, Serbia
- Team colors: Red and White
- Head coach: Renata Mužević

Ženski košarkaški klub Stara Pazova (Serbian Cyrillic: Женски кошаркашки клуб Стара Пазова, English: Women's Basketball Club Stara Pazova) is a Serbian women's basketball team from Stara Pazova, Serbia. The club currently plays in Women's Serbian League.

== Notable former players ==
- Bobana Filipović
- Ivana Dević
- Milica Špikić
- Ivana Grbić
- Iva Musulin
- Dragana Vuković
- Milica Inđić
- Ivana Terzić
- Mirjana Beronja

== Notable former coaches ==
- Jovan Gorec
- Miroslav Kanjevac
- Slađan Ivić
- Željko Babić
