= JASSA Sports Center =

Serbian sport center

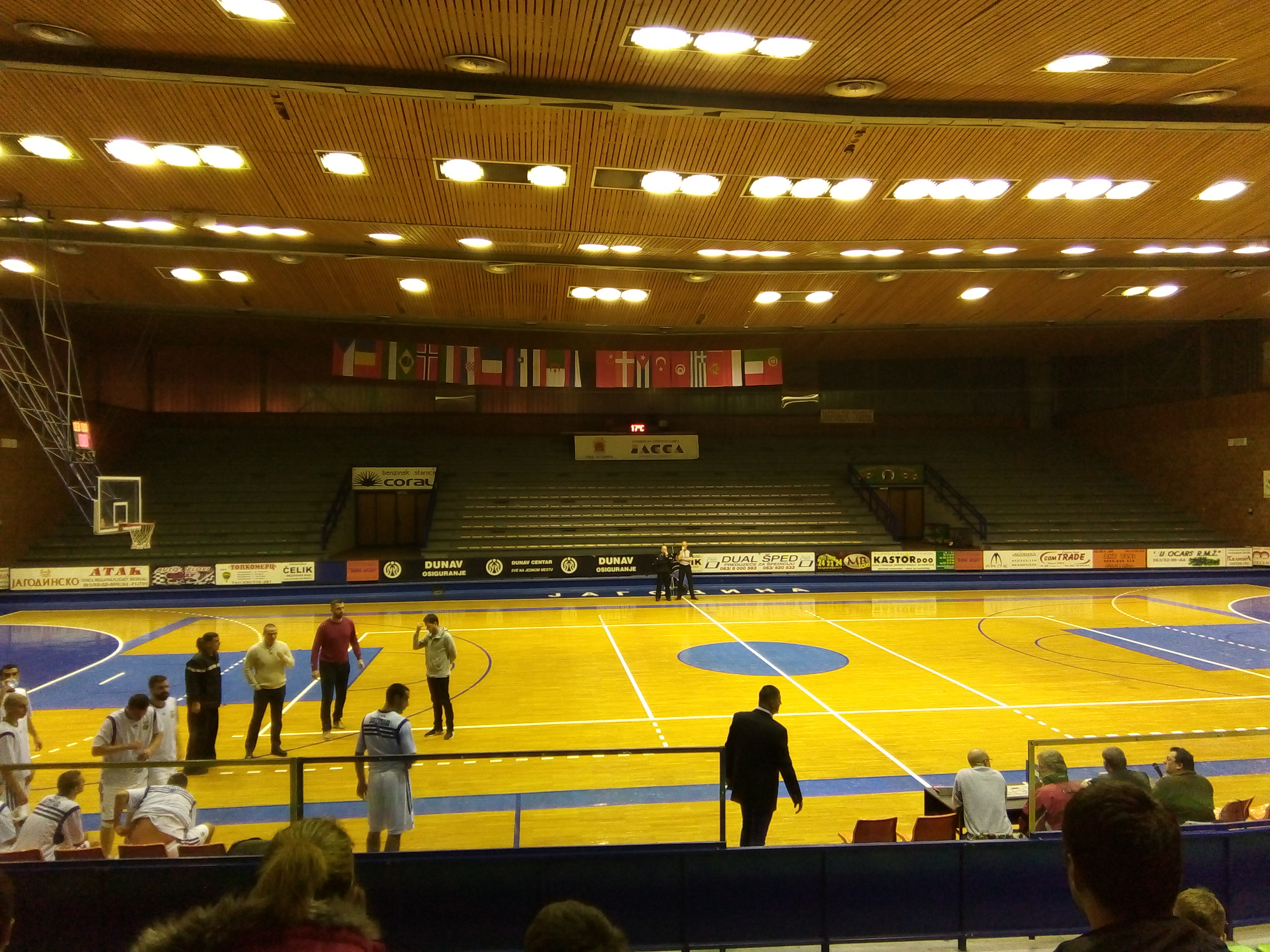
- Location: Braće Dirak, 35000; Jagodina, Serbia
- Owner: Jagodina Sports Association
- Capacity: 2,600

Construction
- Opened: 1978

Tenants
- KK Jagodina; ŽKK Jagodina 2001; RK Jagodina; ŽORK Jagodina; OK Jagodina; ŽOK Jagodina

JASSA Sport Center is an indoor multi-purpose sports arena in Jagodina, Serbia. Hall was opened in 1978. as Sports Hall Mladost, and current name JASSA is actually abbreviation of Jagodina Sports Association, which manages the hall. It is home arena of KK Jagodina, ŽKK Jagodina 2001, RK Jagodina, ŽORK Jagodina, OK Jagodina and ŽOK Jagodina.

Hall has two stands of the same capacity of 1,300 seats, so that the total capacity of 2,600 seats. Hall area is 5500 m2, while the field size 40x20 meters. From accompanying the sports facilities there are also small hall size 20x12 meter field, bowling, gym and judo hall dimensions of 15x8 meters. The hall is still a restaurant, bar, small and large hall for celebrations and office space for several clubs. Parking in front of the hall has space for 1,000 vehicles.

== See also ==
- List of indoor arenas in Serbia
