= ŽKK Jagodina 2001 =

Serbian women's basketball team

- Founded: 25 November 2001
- Dissolved: 2014
- Arena: JASSA Sports Center
- Location: Jagodina, Serbia
- Team colors: blue and White

Ženski košarkaški klub Jagodina 2001 (Serbian Cyrillic: Женски кошаркашки клуб Јагодина 2001, English: Women's Basketball Club Jagodina 2001) is a former women's basketball team from Jagodina, Serbia. Home games were played at the JASSA Sports Center.

== History ==
ŽKK Jagodina 2001 was established on 25 November 2001 with only junior categories. In 2009 they managed to qualify to the Second League of Serbia, and in 2011 for the First League of Serbia. 2014 the club relegated from the First League and after that, the club ceased to exist.

== Arena ==
JASSA Sport Center is an indoor multi-purpose sports arena in Jagodina, Serbia. The hall was opened in 1978 as Sports Hall Mladost. The current name JASSA is actually an abbreviation of Jagodina Sports Association, which manages the hall. The hall has two stands of 1,300 seats, so that the total capacity is 2,600 seats.

The hall area is 5500 m2, while the field size is 40x20 meters. Accompanying the sports facilities there are also a small hall with a 20x12 meter field, and a bowling, gym and judo hall with dimensions of 15x8 meters. The hall is still a restaurant, bar, small and large hall for celebrations and office space for several clubs. Parking in front of the hall has space for 1,000 vehicles.

== Notable former coaches ==
- Slađan Ivić

== See also ==
- KK Jagodina
