= ŽKK Šabac =

Serbian basketball club

OKK Šabac
- Leagues: Serbian League
- Founded: 1 August 1995; 30 years ago
- History: OKK Šabac; 1995–present
- Arena: Šabac High School Hall (capacity: 500)
- Location: Šabac, Serbia
- Team colors: Black and Red
- Head coach: (Serbia) Dejan Popović

Omladinski košarkaški klub Šabac (Serbian Cyrillic: Омладински кошаркашки клуб Шабац, English: Šabac Youth Basketball Club) is a women's basketball club based in Šabac, Serbia. The club currently plays in Women's Serbian League.

== Notable former players ==
- Andrea Pinter
- Vanja Lukić
- Aleksandra Begenisić
- Danica Simić
- Marija Acslović
- Ana Savić
- Sara Marković
- Jelena Stanković
- Nataša Zolotić
- Kristina Topuzović
- Andrijana Abadzić
- Ana Daskalović
- Jana Marković
- Sara Nešić
- Darja Zolotić
