= ŽKK Šumadija Kragujevac =

Serbian basketball team

- Leagues: Serbian League
- Arena: Hall Gordana Goca Bogojević (capacity: 600)
- Location: Kragujevac, Serbia
- Team colors: Green and White
- President: (Serbia) ??
- Head coach: (Serbia) Darko Jakovljević

Ženski košarkaški klub Šumadija Kragujevac (Serbian Cyrillic: Женски кошаркашки клуб Шумадија Крагујевац, English: Women's Basketball Club Šumadija Kragujevac) is a Serbian women's basketball team from Kragujevac, Serbia. The club currently plays in Women's Serbian League.

== 2015 roster ==
Note: Flags indicate national team eligibility at FIBA-sanctioned events. Players may hold other non-FIBA nationalities not displayed.

ŽKK Šumadija Kragujevac roster
Players
Coaches

Pos.	No.	Nat.	Name	Ht.	Wt.	Age
G	3	(Serbia)	Prvulović, Jelena	1.75 m (5 ft 9 in)
F	4	(Serbia)	Milošević, Kristina	1.77 m (5 ft 10 in)
C	5	(Serbia)	Todorović, Milica	1.91 m (6 ft 3 in)
G	8	(North Macedonia)	Lazareska, Sofija	1.72 m (5 ft 8 in)
G	9	(Serbia)	Mršić, Marija	1.74 m (5 ft 9 in)
G	10	(Serbia)	Katić, Aleksandra	1.72 m (5 ft 8 in)
PG	12	(United States)	Gardner, Stephanie	1.70 m (5 ft 7 in)
G/F	13	(Serbia)	Bezarević, Neda	1.76 m (5 ft 9 in)
G	14	(Serbia)	Martinović, Neda	1.73 m (5 ft 8 in)
C	22	(United States)	Williams, Paris	1.89 m (6 ft 2 in)
C	32	(Serbia)	Laković, Milena	1.86 m (6 ft 1 in)
F		(Serbia)	Trifunović, Neda	1.80 m (5 ft 11 in)

Head coach

- (Serbia) Darko Jakovljević

Assistant coach(es)

- (Serbia) Nenad Milovanović

Legend

- (C) Team captain
- Injured

- Roster
Updated: 29 November 2015

== Notable former players ==
- Marina Marković
- Jelena Milovanović
- Adrijana Knežević

== Notable former coaches ==
- Petar Marković
