= ŽKK Radnički Kragujevac =

Serbian basketball club

Radnički Kragujevac
- Leagues: Serbian League
- Founded: 1967; 58 years ago
- Arena: Gordana Bogojević Hall
- Capacity: 600
- Location: Kragujevac, Serbia
- Team colors: Red and White
- Head coach: Nenad Milovanović
- Ownership: SPD Radnički
- Website: kkkradnicki.rs

Ženski košarkaški klub Radnički (Serbian Cyrillic: Женски кошаркашки клуб Раднички), commonly referred to as Radnički Kragujevac or SPD Radnički, is a women's professional basketball club based in Kragujevac, Serbia. It's a part of the Radnički multi-sports company. The club currently plays in Women's Serbian League.

== History ==
The decision of the Radnički men's basketball club, with the approval of the Radnički Sports Association, in 1967 the Women's Club was formed. The first president was elected Professor Stevan Žilović, and the coach was Jovan Antić, known as Jova Piroćanac, who performed the first selection. In the first year of competition, the club is in Serbian league-South took the last place. It was only in 1971. year, began the serious work when the coach was Vlastimir Kovačević - Batica when they formed the pioneering schools in the primary school Svetozar Marković and Radoje Domanović. The separation of the male and female club coming in 1986. year. ŽKK Radnički five times in the highest ranks of the competition. In First National League Yugoslavia played in seasons: 1975–76, 1977–78, 1980–81 and 1986-87 (coach Rajko Levajac and Vlastimir Kovačević), and the First A league SRJ 1999–00.

The most famous player was Vesna Despotović, who played for Yugoslavia 90 times in all selections and has scored 21,240 points in the 22-year-long career. She is the first athlete of Kragujevac to win an Olympic medal, the bronze in Moscow in 1980. She also won medals at the Balkan and European Championships. In addition to the Vesna Despotović in the national team have successfully and proudly played Snežana Pavlović, Mirjana Jovanović, Gordana Bogojević and Snežana Bozinović.

The greatest sports success in club history starts in 2008. when this small club entered the top league in Serbia, president of the club was Zvonko Ognjanovic, head coach Vladimir S. For the next 8 years the club was in the elite league of Serbia, the top place was 4th at the end of 2012–13 season.

== Arena ==
Hall Gordana Goca Bogojević is a multi-purpose indoor arena located in the Kragujevac and it has a capacity of 600 seats.

== Notable former players ==
- Vesna Despotović
- Snežana Pavlović
- Mirjana Jovanović
- Gordana Bogojević
- Snežana Bozinović
- Nikolina Milić

== Notable former coaches ==
- Jovan Antić
- Rajko Levajac
- Vlastimir Kovačević
- Vesna Despotović
- Zoran Cvetanović
