= ŽKK Vojvodina =

Defunct basketball club in Novi Sad, Serbia

Vojvodina
- Founded: 1948
- Dissolved: 2016
- Arena: SPC Vojvodina
- Location: Novi Sad, Serbia
- Team colors: Red and white
- Championships: 2 National Championships; 2 National Cups

Ženski košarkaški klub Vojvodina (Serbian Cyrillic: Женски кошаркашки клуб Војводина, Women's Basketball Club Vojvodina) was a women's basketball team from Novi Sad, Serbia. It was part of the multi-sports club Vojvodina.

== History ==
ŽKK Vojvodina was founded 1948 in Novi Sad, Serbia. He was part of the multi-sports club Vojvodina. In the course of its history ŽKK Vojvodina has twice been state champion and cup winner.

On April 17, 2015, Ana Dabović became club president despite the fact that at the time she was active basketball player. In October 2016, she left the position of club president.

In December 2016, the club was expelled from the league, which effectively ended the club's existence.

== Arena ==
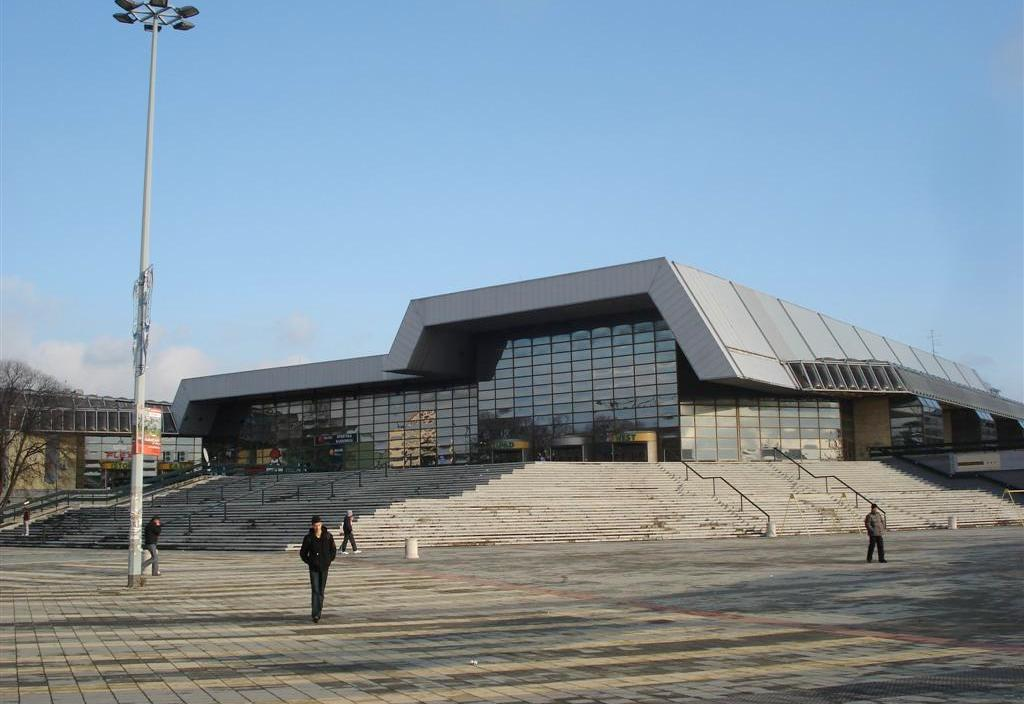
SPC Vojvodina

Sports Center Vojvodina is a multi-purpose indoor arena located in Novi Sad. It operates under publicly owned company JP "Sportski i poslovni centar Vojvodina", which in addition to SPENS also has "Sajmište Sports Center" under its umbrella. There are two halls one has a capacity of 11,500 seats, and second halls of 1,030 seats. Sprawled over 85,000 m^{2}, SPENS consists of main hall, 'small' hall, ice-hockey rink (which can house 1,623), bowling alley, shooting range, 3 training halls, swimming pool, 11 tennis courts, media center, 2 press centers, amphitheater, reception salon, conference hall, double-level garage, and 215 retail and business spaces that house banks, furniture stores, tourist agencies, jewelers, bookstores, pool halls, fitness clubs, boutiques, etc. Its construction was completed in less than 2 years, and on 14 April 1981, SPENS opened its door for the first time, its inaugural event being the 9th Table Tennis European Championships in Novi Sad (Serbian: Stonotenisko prvenstvo Evrope Novi Sad – SPENS, hence the unofficial name of the venue).

SPENS' most famous residents are basketball's KK Vojvodina Srbijagas (participating in Basketball League of Serbia) and volleyball's OK Vojvodina. Spens is hosted basketball's European Cup Winners' Cup Final 1987, group D (group stage) of Eurobasket 2005, Group C (group stage) and the Group II of the main round, which consisted of the 2012 European Men's Handball Championship and played Serbia men's national volleyball team in FIVB World League, as well as its friendly warm-up games.

== Supporters ==
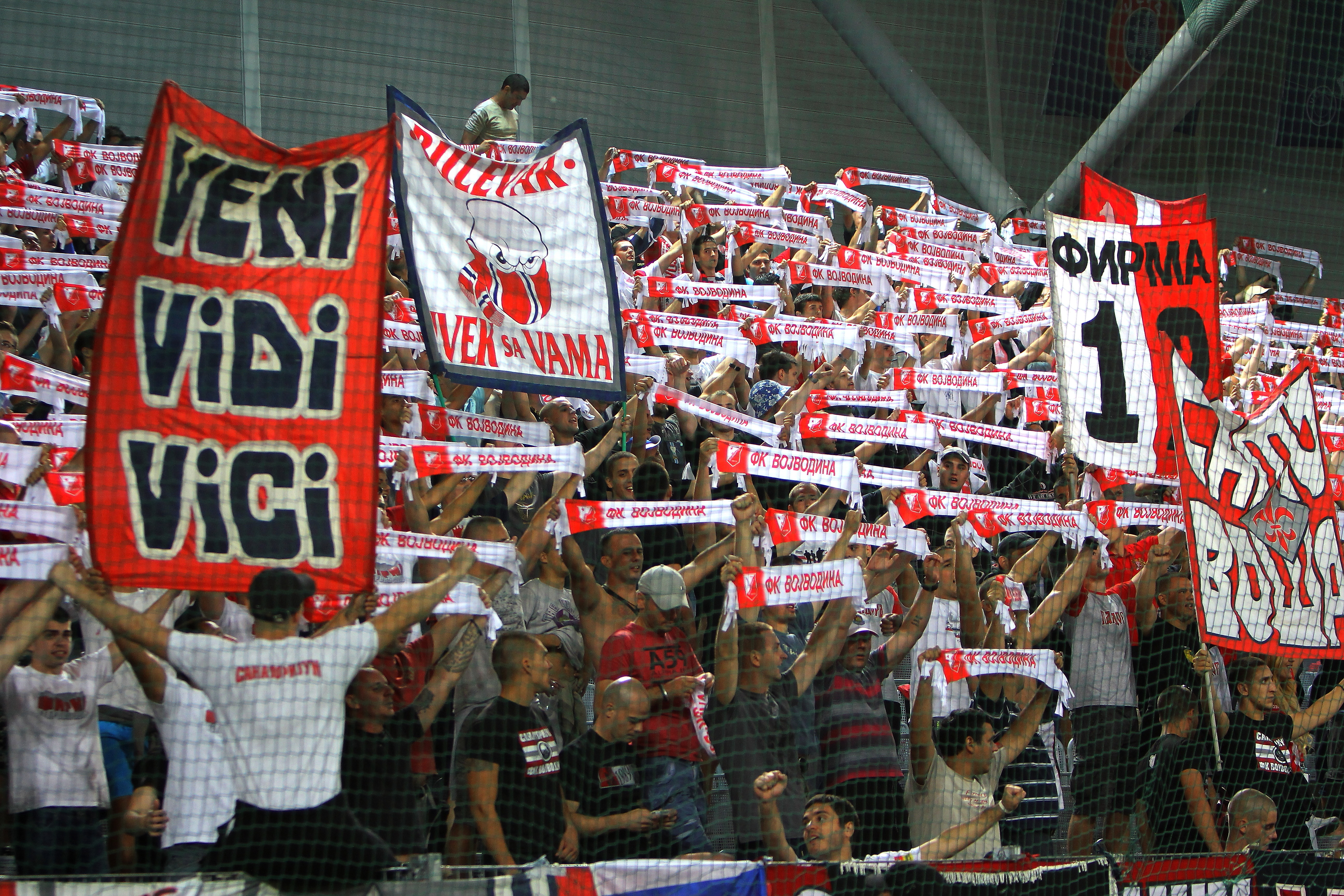
The Firmaši

The Firma (Serbian Cyrillic: Фирма) are supporters of the Novi Sad football club Vojvodina. Although the club had numerous supporters throughout the history, more organized groups emerged end of the 1970s and beginning of the 1980s. In 1989, for the first time starts the idea of uniting of all the smaller supporter groups. This idea is realized and the group was named Red Firm. A few days later, several youngsters established the group Firma (English: The Firm) as one of the subgroups, because they wanted a Serbian name for their group.

The disintegration of Yugoslavia and its follows led to stagnation in all Yugoslavian supporter groups so that in 1992, the Red Firm fell apart and the Firma took over the leadership of the organized supports. The members of Firma call themselves Firmaši (English:Members of the Firma), the plural of the singular form Firmaš, and belongs today to the top supporter groups in Serbia. They are more known as ultras, not hooligans.

Besides football, they also support other sport sections of the Vojvodina Novi Sad Sport Association. The club also has a group of their oldest supporters, called the Stara Garda (English: Old Guard) and who are for more than 40 years in the east stand of the stadium. The Firma are in a brotherhood with the organized fan group of Borac Banja Luka from Bosnia and Herzegovina, the Lešinari.

== Honours ==
=== Domestic ===
National Championships – 2

- First League of SFR Yugoslavia:
  - Winners (2) : 1969, 1970
  - Runners-up (2) : 1972, 1992
- First League of FR Yugoslavia / Serbia and Montenegro:
  - Runners-up (3) : 2004, 2005, 2006
- First League of Serbia:
  - Runners-up (1) : 2015

National Cups – 2

- Cup of SFR Yugoslavia:
  - Runners-up (2) : 1972
- Cup of FR Yugoslavia / Serbia and Montenegro:
  - Winners (1) : 2001
  - Runners-up (2) : 1995, 1998, 1999, 2005, 2006
- Milan Ciga Vasojević Cup:
  - Winners (1) : 2015
  - Runners-up (1) : 2007

=== International ===
International titles – 0

- Adriatic League:
  - Runners-up (1) : 2006

== Notable former players ==
- Marija Veger
- Gordana Grubin
- Ljubica Drljača
- Marija Erić
- Suzana Milovanović
- Slobodanka Tuvić
- Jasmina Perazić
- Ana Joković
- Milica Beljanski
- Nataša Ivančević
- Neda Đurić
- Dragana Vuković
- Stojanka Došić
- Snežana Momirov
- Ivana Matović
- Ana Perović
- Snežana Jovanović
- Tatjana Mitrić
- Andrea Pinter
- Nataša Bučevac
- Aleksandra Vujović
- Biljana Pavićević
- Jovana Popović
- Irena Matović
- Jelena Milovanović
- Milica Dabović
- Sara Krnjić
- Jasmina Perazić
- Jasmina Ilić
- Jovana Pašić
- Jelena Vučetić

== Coaching history ==
- (Socialist Federal Republic of Yugoslavia) Stevan Putnik (1948)
- (Socialist Federal Republic of Yugoslavia) Vojislav Panić (1958–1960)
- (Socialist Federal Republic of Yugoslavia) Ladislav Demšar (1964–1972)
- (Socialist Federal Republic of Yugoslavia) Milutin Minja (1973–1974)
- (Socialist Federal Republic of Yugoslavia) Stevan Mezei (1974–1975)
- (Socialist Federal Republic of Yugoslavia) Ladislav Demšar (1980–1984)
- (Hungary) László Rátgéber (1984–1993)
- (Serbia and Montenegro) Dragan Vuković
- (Serbia and Montenegro) Milovan Stepandić (2003–2004)
- (Serbia and Montenegro) Dragomir Bukvić (2004–2005)
- (Serbia) Zoran Višić (2006)
- (Serbia) Radojica Nikitović (2006–2008)
- (Serbia) Zoran Mirković (2010–2011)
- (Serbia) Dušan Kasum (2011–2012)
- (Serbia) Miodrag Selimović (2012–2013)
- (Serbia) Aleksandar Jovanović (2013–2014)
- (Serbia) Milan Dabović (2014–2016)

== See also ==
- List of basketball clubs in Serbia by major honours won
