= 2008–09 WABA Multipower =

- League: WABA Multipower
- Sport: Basketball
- Duration: 11 October 2008 - 15 March 2009
- Number of games: 84
- Number of teams: 9

2008–09
- Season champions: (Croatia) Šibenik Jolly (4th title)
- Season MVP: (United States) Constance Jinks

WABA League seasons
- ← 2007–08 2009–10 →

WABA Multipower for season 2008–09 was the eighth season of WABA League. The league included nine teams from five countries, with Šibenik Jolly becoming champions, for the fourth time in the team's history. In this season participating clubs from Serbia, Montenegro, Bosnia and Herzegovina, Croatia and from Slovenia.

The season began on 11 October 2008 and ended on 28 February 2009, when it completed a Regular season. The Final Four was played during the 14th and 15 March 2009 in Bijelo Polje, Montenegro. The Winner of the Final Four this season was Šibenik Jolly from Croatia.

== Team information ==
Country	Teams	Team	City	Venue (Capacity)
Croatia	4			
Croatia	4	Gospić Croatia Osiguranje	Gospić	Gradska Školska Sportska Dvorana (2,000)
Croatia	4	Šibenik Jolly	Šibenik	Dvorana Baldekin (1,500)
Croatia	4	Medveščak	Zagreb	ŠD Peščenica (600)
Croatia	4	Ragusa Dubrovnik	Dubrovnik	Športska dvorana Gospino polje (1,400)
Montenegro	2			
Montenegro	2	Budućnost	Podgorica	Morača Sports Center (4,570)
Montenegro	2	Jedinstvo	Bijelo Polje	Nikoljac (2,000)
Bosnia and Herzegovina	1			
Bosnia and Herzegovina	1	Mladi Krajišnik	Banja Luka	Sports hall Obilićevo (800)
Serbia	1			
Serbia	1	Vojvodina NIS	Novi Sad	SPC Vojvodina (1,030)
Slovenia	1			
Slovenia	1	Merkur Celje	Celje	Dvorana Gimnazije Celje - Center (1,500)

== Regular season ==
The season was played with 9 teams in a dual circuit system, each team playing one game at home and one away. The four best teams at the end of the regular season were placed in the Final Four. The regular season began on 11 October 2008 and it ended on 28 February 2009.

Place	Team	Pld	W	L	PF	PA	Diff	Pts	
1.	(Croatia) Šibenik Jolly	16	13	3	1241	1033	+208	29	Final Four
2.	(Montenegro) Jedinstvo	16	12	4	1106	1003	+103	28	Final Four
3.	Gospić Croatia Osiguranje	16	10	6	1277	1087	+190	26	Final Four
4.	(Slovenia) Merkur Celje	16	8	8	1131	1061	+70	24	Final Four
5.	(Croatia) Ragusa Dubrovnik	16	8	8	1123	1141	-18	24	
6.	(Croatia) Medveščak	16	7	9	1123	1175	-52	23	
7.	(Montenegro) Budućnost	16	5	11	1136	1227	-91	21	
8.	(Serbia) Vojvodina NIS	16	5	11	1074	1205	-131	21	
9.	(Bosnia and Herzegovina) Mladi Krajišnik	16	3	13	953	1232	-279	19	

1. round
(11.10.)	Medveščak – Mladi Krajišnik	73:52
(11.10.)	Ragusa – Gospić	81:65
(11.10.)	Jedinstvo – Budućnost	84:56
(11.10.)	Šibenik - Vojvodina	93:67

2. round
(18.10.)	Vojvodina - Merkur Celje	77:67
(18.10.)	Budućnost - Šibenik	73:89
(18.10.)	Medveščak - Ragusa	68:72
(18.10.)	Gospić - Jedinstvo	78:65

3. round
(25.10.)	Ragusa – Mladi Krajišnik	74:37
(25.10.)	Šibenik - Gospić	59:56
(25.10.)	Merkur Celje – Budućnost	66:69
(25.10.)	Jedinstvo - Medveščak	60:42

4. round
(2.11.)	Ragusa - Jedinstvo	68:72
(1.11.)	Mladi Krajišnik - Vojvodina	60:84
(31.10.)	Gospić - Merkur Celje	74:69
(31.10.)	Medveščak - Šibenik	59:66

5. round
(9.11.)	Jedinstvo - Mladi Krajišnik	74:72
(9.11.)	Šibenik - Ragusa	95:71
(8.11.)	Merkur Celje - Medveščak	69:58
(8.11.)	Vojvodina - Budućnost	77:71

6. round
(2.12.)	Ragusa - Merkur Celje	60:89
(24.11.)	Šibenik - Jedinstvo	76:64
(15.11.)	Mladi Krajišnik - Budućnost	64:77
(15.11.)	Gospić - Vojvodina	91:54

7. round
(7.12.)	Šibenik - Mladi Krajišnik	77:29
(23.11.)	Vojvodina - Medveščak	76:72
(23.11.)	Budućnost - Gospić	82:67
(23.11.)	Merkur Celje - Jedinstvo	41:44

8. round
(29.11.)	Mladi Krajišnik - Gospić	62:82
(29.11.)	Medveščak - Budućnost	90:78
(29.11.)	Vojvodina - Ragusa	66:68
(29.11.)	Šibenik - Merkur Celje	69:57

9. round
(6.12.)	Merkur Celje - Mladi Krajišnik	72:43
(6.12.)	Vojvodina - Jedinstvo	52:70
(6.12.)	Budućnost - Ragusa	65:61
(6.12.)	Gospić - Medveščak	68:72

10. round
(13.12.)	Mladi Krajišnik - Medveščak	73:98
(13.12.)	Gospić - Ragusa	91:59
(13.12.)	Budućnost - Jedinstvo	66:72
(13.12.)	Vojvodina - Šibenik	61:80

11. round
(20.12.)	Merkur Celje - Vojvodina	75:62
(20.12.)	Šibenik - Budućnost	94:73
(20.12.)	Jedinstvo - Gospić	69:67
(20.12.)	Ragusa - Medveščak	86:68

12. round
(12.2.)	Mladi Krajišnik - Ragusa	68:65
(17.1.)	Budućnost - Merkur Celje	68:69
(23.12.)	Medveščak - Jedinstvo	65:53
(23.12.)	Gospić - Šibenik	71:83

13. round
(24.1.)	Vojvodina - Mladi Krajišnik	69:63
(24.1.)	Merkur Celje - Gospić	61:73
(24.1.)	Šibenik - Medveščak	70:43
(24.1.)	Jedinstvo - Ragusa	66:41

14. round
(1.2.)	Budućnost - Vojvodina	79:65
(31.1.)	Mladi Krajišnik - Jedinstvo	78:74
(31.1.)	Ragusa - Šibenik	83:71
(31.1.)	Medveščak - Merkur Celje	89:88

15. round
(8.2.)	Jedinstvo - Šibenik	86:81
(8.2.)	Vojvodina - Gospić	70:85
(7.2.)	Merkur Celje - Ragusa	81:64
(7.2.)	Budućnost - Mladi Krajišnik	62:65

16. round
(14.2.)	Mladi Krajišnik - Šibenik	65:69
(14.2.)	Jedinstvo - Merkur Celje	75:67
(14.2.)	Medveščak - Vojvodina	79:74
(14.2.)	Gospić - Budućnost	99:68

17. round
(21.2.)	Gospić - Mladi Krajišnik	97:55
(21.2.)	Budućnost - Medveščak	77:69
(21.2.)	Merkur Celje - Šibenik	75:69
(3.2.)	Ragusa - Vojvodina	77:67

18. round
(28.2.)	Medveščak - Gospić	78:113
(28.2.)	Ragusa - Budućnost	93:72
(28.2.)	Jedinstvo - Vojvodina	75:53
(28.2.)	Mladi Krajišnik - Merkur Celje	67:85

== Final four ==
The final four was played from 14 to 15 March 2009, in the Nikoljac hall in Bijelo Polje, Montenegro.

club 1	result	club 2
semifinals
(Croatia) Šibenik Jolly	75:49	(Slovenia) Merkur Celje
(Montenegro) Jedinstvo	67:65	Gospić Croatia Osiguranje
for third place
Gospić Croatia Osiguranje	76:62	(Slovenia) Merkur Celje
final
(Croatia) Šibenik Jolly	69:63	(Montenegro) Jedinstvo

2008–09 WABA Multipower

Šibenik Jolly JBS
4th Title

== Awards ==
- Player of the Year: Constance Jinks (170-G-81) of Šibenik Jolly (Croatia)
- Coach of the Year: Anđelko Matov of Šibenik Jolly (Croatia)

1st Team

- Constance Jinks (170-G-81) of Šibenik Jolly (Croatia)
- Marija Vrsaljko (195-C-89) of Gospić Croatia Osiguranje
- Luca Ivanković (200-C-87) of Šibenik Jolly (Croatia)
- Jasmina Bigović (174-G-79) of Jedinstvo (Montenegro)
- Monique Blake (188-F-85) of Merkur Celje (Slovenia)

2nd Team

- Ivana Jurčević (174-G-81) of Šibenik Jolly (Croatia)
- Jelena Ivezić (184-G-84) of Gospić Croatia Osiguranje
- Carla Thomas (191-F/C-85) of Gospić Croatia Osiguranje
- Mirna Mazić (188-F-85) of Medveščak (Croatia)
- Lady Comfort (188-C-86) of Budućnost (Montenegro)

Honorable Mention

- Neda Lokas (182-F-85) of Šibenik Jolly (Croatia)
- Marta Čakić (175-G-82) of Šibenik Jolly (Croatia)
- Lamisha Augustine (186-F-82) of Gospić Croatia Osiguranje
- Dea Klein-Šumanovac (182-G/F-81) of Medveščak (Croatia)
- Sanja Knežević (187-F-84) of Jedinstvo (Montenegro)
- Nika Barič (168-G-92) of Merkur Celje (Slovenia)
- Dragoslava Žakula (173-G-73) of Mladi Krajišnik (Bosnia and Herzegovina)
- Matea Vrdoljak (186-F-85) of Ragusa Dubrovnik (Croatia)
- Anja Stupar (178-F/C-89) of Vojvodina NIS (Serbia)
