= Martina Gambiraža =

Croatian basketball player

Personal information
- Born: November 27, 1982 (age 43) Zadar, SFR Yugoslavia
- Listed height: 1.76 m (5 ft 9 in)

Career information
- WNBA draft: 2004: undrafted
- Playing career: –2014
- Position: Point guard / shooting guard

Career history
- Gospić
- Ragusa Dubrovnik
- Studenac Omiš
- Mladi Krajišnik
- Zadar
- Kvarner
- Šibenik
- UNI Győr
- 2014: Rilski Sportist

Martina Gambiraža (born 27 November 1982 in Zadar, SFR Yugoslavia) is a Croatian female basketball player.
