= 2010–11 MŽRKL =

- League: MŽRKL
- Sport: Basketball
- Duration: 6 October 2010 – 6 March 2011
- Games: 135
- Teams: 12

2010–11
- Season champions: (Croatia) Šibenik (5th title)
- Season MVP: (Montenegro) Ana Turčinović

WABA League seasons
- ← 2009–10 2011–12 →

The 2010–11 MŽRKL was the 10th season of the WABA League. The study included twelve teams from five countries, a champion for the fifth time in team history became Šibenik. In this season participating clubs from Serbia, Montenegro, Bosnia and Herzegovina, Croatia and Slovenia.

The season has begun on 6 October 2010 and ended on 20 February 2011, when he it was completed a Regular season. Final Four to be played from 5–6 March 2011. in Šibenik, Croatia. Winner Final Four this season for the team Šibenik from Croatia.

== Team information ==
Country	Teams	Team	City	Venue (Capacity)
Croatia	4			
Croatia	4	Gospić	Gospić	Gradska Skolska Sportska Dvorana (2,000)
Croatia	4	Šibenik	Šibenik	Dvorana Baldekin (1,500)
Croatia	4	Medveščak	Zagreb	ŠD Peščenica (600)
Croatia	4	Novi Zagreb	Zagreb	Športska dvorana Trnsko (2,500)
Serbia	4			
Serbia	4	Partizan	Belgrade	Belgrade Sport Palace (5,000)
Serbia	4	Vojvodina	Novi Sad	SPC Vojvodina (1,030)
Serbia	4	Radivoj Korać	Belgrade	Sport EKO Hall (1,000)
Serbia	4	Voždovac	Belgrade	SC Šumice (2.000)
Slovenia	2			
Slovenia	2	Merkur Celje	Celje	Dvorana Gimnazije Celje – Center (1,500)
Slovenia	2	Maribor	Maribor	Tabor Hall (3,800)
Bosnia and Herzegovina	1			
Bosnia and Herzegovina	1	Čelik	Zenica	Arena Zenica (6,200)
Montenegro	1	Jedinstvo	Bijelo Polje	Nikoljac (2,000)

== Regular season ==
The League of the season was played with 12 teams and play a dual circuit system, each with each one game at home and away. The four best teams at the end of the regular season were placed in the Final Four. The regular season began on 6 October 2010 and it will end on 20 February 2011.

Place	Team	Pld	W	L	PF	PA	Diff	Pts	
1.	(Croatia) Gospić	22	19	3	1913	1467	+446	41	Final Four
2.	(Serbia) Partizan	22	17	5	1667	1465	+202	39	Final Four
3.	(Croatia) Šibenik	22	16	6	1596	1414	+182	38	Final Four
4.	(Slovenia) Merkur Celje	22	16	6	1566	1417	+149	38	Final Four
5.	(Montenegro) Jedinstvo Bijelo Polje	22	14	8	1400	1337	+63	36	
6.	(Serbia) Radivoj Korać	22	11	11	1502	1520	–18	33	
7.	(Croatia) Novi Zagreb	22	10	12	1463	1520	–57	32	
8.	(Bosnia and Herzegovina) Čelik Zenica	22	9	13	1494	1590	–96	31	
9.	(Serbia) Voždovac	22	7	15	1388	1523	–135	29	
10.	(Serbia) Vojvodina	22	6	16	1308	1488	–180	28	
11.	(Slovenia) Maribor	22	5	17	1473	1719	–246	27	
12.	(Croatia) Medveščak	22	2	20	1290	1600	–310	24	

1. round
(6.10.)	Radivoj Korać – Medveščak	89–70
(6.10.)	Vojvodina – Jedinstvo	62–58
(6.10.)	Šibenik – Čelik	86–67
(6.10.)	Voždovac – Novi Zagreb	7–62
(6.10.)	Merkur Celje – Maribor	83–66
(6.10.)	Partizan – Gospić	100–96

2. round
(9.10.)	Gospić – Medveščak	103–64
(10.10.)	Maribor – Partizan	73–89
(10.10.)	Novi Zagreb – Merkur Celje	64–76
(9.10.)	Čelik – Voždovac	74–69
(10.10.)	Jedinstvo – Šibenik	67–70
(9.10.)	Radivoj Korać – Vojvodina	81–49

3. round
(16.10.)	Vojvodina – Medveščak	72–74
(16.10.)	Šibenik – Radivoj Korać	78–74
(17.10.)	Voždovac – Jedinstvo	58–62
(16.10.)	Merkur Celje – Čelik	80–60
(15.10.)	Partizan – Novi Zagreb	73–63
(16.10.)	Gospić – Maribor	102–72

4. round
(23.10.)	Maribor – Medveščak	76–63
(24.10.)	Novi Zagreb – Gospić	71–89
(23.10.)	Čelik – Partizan	58–62
(24.10.)	Jedinstvo – Merkur Celje	81–71
(23.10.)	Radvioj Korać – Voždovac	78–79
(23.10.)	Vojvodina – Šibenik	55–60

5. round
(30.10.)	Šibenik – Medveščak	86–61
(30.10.)	Voždovac – Vojvodina	51–66
(30.10.)	Merkur Celje – Radivoj Korać	60–52
(31.10.)	Partizan – Jedinstvo	57–38
(30.10.)	Gospić – Čelik	103–65
(30.10.)	Maribor – Novi Zagreb	89–81

6. round
(6.11.)	Medveščak – Novi Zagreb	39–60
(6.11.)	Čelik – Maribor	77–62
(6.11.)	Gospić – Jedinstvo	90–62
(7.11.)	Radivoj Korać – Partizan	86–84
(6.11.)	Vojvodina – Merkur Celje	58–63
(6.11.)	Šibenik – Voždovac	69–59

7. round
(14.11.)	Voždovac – Medveščak	71–57
(14.11.)	Merkur Celje – Šibenik	68–57
(13.11.)	Partizan – Vojvodina	71–62
(14.11.)	Gospić – Radivoj Korać	90–57
(13.11.)	Maribor – Jedinstvo	80–72
(14.11.)	Novi Zagreb – Čelik	75–73

8. round
(20.11.)	Medvešćak – Čelik	61–64
(20.11.)	Jedinstvo – Novi Zagreb	72–66
(20.11.)	Radivoj Korać – Maribor	83–74
(20.11.)	Vojvodina – Gospić	40–70
(20.11.)	Šibenik – Partizan	53–68
(20.11.)	Voždovac – Merkur Celje	65–69

9. round
(27.11.)	Merkur Celje – Medveščak	80–66
(28.11.)	Partizan – Voždovac	68–60
(28.11.)	Gospić – Šibenik	85–66
(27.11.)	Maribor – Vojvodina	62–77
(28.11.)	Novi Zagreb – Radivoj Korać	67–63
(27.11.)	Čelik – Jedinstvo	69–72

10. round
(4.12.)	Medveščak – Jedinstvo	50–69
(4.12.)	Radivoj Korać – Čelik	66–54
(4.12.)	Vojvodina – Novi Zagreb	55–63
(4.12.)	Šibenik – Maribor	90–50
(1.2.)	Voždovac – Gospić	77–73
(4.12.)	Merkur Celje – Partizan	76–70

11. round
(11.12.)	Partizan – Medveščak	83–62
(11.12.)	Gospić – Merkur Celje	97–87
(11.12.)	Maribor – Voždovac	66–72
(12.12.)	Novi Zagreb – Šibenik	51–49
(11.12.)	Čelik – Vojvodina	76–69
(11.12.)	Jedinstvo – Radivoj Korać	80–72

12. round
(18.12.)	Medveščak – Radivoj Korać	58–70
(17.12.)	Jedinstvo – Vojvodina	62–54
(2.2.)	Čelik – Šibenik	68–78
(19.12.)	Novi Zagreb – Voždovac	69–55
(18.12.)	Maribor – Merkur Celje	62–83
(18.12.)	Gospić – Partizan	72–63

13. round
(21.12.)	Medveščak – Gospić	52–76
(5.1.)	Partizan – Maribor	99–70
(5.1.)	Merkur Celje – Novi Zagreb	64–56
(5.1.)	Voždovac – Čelik	54–67
(18.2.)	Šibenik – Jedinstvo	70–59
(10.2.)	Vojvodina – Radivoj Korać	49–63

14. round
(12.1.)	Medveščak – Vojvodina	59–80
(9.1.)	Radivoj Korać – Šibenik	54–78
(9.1.)	Jedinstvo – Voždovac	73–52
(9.1.)	Čelik - Merkur Celje	77–66
(8.1.)	Novi Zagreb – Partizan	64–75
(8.1.)	Maribor – Gospić	59–104

15. round
(15.1.)	Medveščak - Maribor	58–63
(16.1.)	Gospić – Novi Zagreb	98–65
(16.1.)	Partizan – Čelik	73–64
(15.1.)	Merkur Celje – Jedinstvo	58–67
(15.1.)	Voždovac – Radivoj Korać	54–65
(15.1.)	Šibenik – Vojvodina	74–55

16. round
(22.1.)	Medveščak – Šibenik	59–81
(21.1.)	Vojvodina – Voždovac	48–44
(22.1.)	Radivoj Korać – Merkur Celje	49–61
(23.1.)	Jedinstvo – Partizan	83–63
(22.1.)	Čelik – Gospić	56–85
(22.1.)	Novi Zagreb – Maribor	86–78

17. round
(26.1.)	Novi Zagreb – Medveščak	64–59
(26.1.)	Maribor – Čelik	77–72
(27.1.)	Jedinstvo – Gospić	68–75
(27.1.)	Partizan – Radivoj Korać	95–69
(26.1.)	Merkur Celje – Vojvodina	66–56
(26.1.)	Voždovac – Šibenik	55–64

18. round
(29.1.)	Medveščak – Voždivac	54–66
(30.1.)	Šibenik – Merkur Celje	83–57
(29.1.)	Vojvodina – Partizan	56–80
(30.1.)	Radivoj Korać – Gospić	55–70
(11.2.)	Jedinstvo – Maribor	2–0
(29.1.)	Čelik – Šibenik	71–76

19. round
(5.2.)	Čelik – Medveščak	66–60
(5.2.)	Novi Zagreb – Jedinstvo	54–69
(6.2.)	Maribor – Radivoj Korać	66–69
(5.2.)	Gospić – Vojvodina	89–54
(6.2.)	Partizan – Šibenik	81–61
(7.2.)	Merkur Celje – Voždovac	86–49

20. round
(12.2.)	Medveščak – Merkur Celje	53–67
(11.2.)	Voždovac – Partizan	65–71
(12.2.)	Šibenik – Gospić	76–81
(12.2.)	Vojvodina – Maribor	77–73
(13.2.)	Radivoj Korać – Novi Zagreb	69–66
(13.2.)	Jedinstvo – Čelik	68–50

21. round
(15.2.)	Jeidnstvo – Medveščak	52–48
(16.2.)	Čelik – Radivoj Korać	74–70
(16.2.)	Novi Zagreb – Vojvodina	71–54
(15.2.)	Maribor – Šibenik	71–87
(16.2.)	Gospić – Voždovac	98–70
(16.2.)	Partizan – Merkur Celje	62–57

22. round
(19.2.)	Medveščak – Partizan	63–62
(19.2.)	Merkur Celje – Gospić	88–67
(20.2.)	Voždovac – Maribor	93–84
(20.2.)	Šibenik – Novi Zagreb	80–69
(19.2.)	Vojvodina – Čelik	60–78
(20.2.)	Radivoj Korać – Jedinstvo	68:64

== Final four ==
The Final Four was played from 5–6 March 2011 in the Baldekin Hall in Šibenik, Croatia.

club 1	result	club 2
semifinals
(Croatia) Gospić	20–0 bb	(Serbia) Partizan
(Croatia) Šibenik Jolly	90–65	(Slovenia) Merkur Celje
final
(Croatia) Šibenik Jolly	20–0 bb	(Croatia) Gospić

2010–11 MŽRKL

Šibenik
5th Title

== Awards ==
- Player of the Year: Ana Turčinović (190-C-93) of Merkur Celje (Slovenia)
- Guard of the Year: Nika Barič (169-G-92) of Merkur Celje (Slovenia)
- Forward of the Year: Neda Lokas (182-F-85) of Šibenik (Croatia)
- Center of the Year: Ana Turčinović (190-C-93) of Merkur Celje (Slovenia)
- Import Player of the Year: Maurita Reid (173-G-85) of Gospić (Croatia)
- European Player of the Year: Ana Turčinović (190-C-93) of Merkur Celje (Slovenia)
- Defensive Player of the Year: Ana Turčinović (190-C-93) of Merkur Celje (Slovenia)
- Coach of the Year: Ante Nerber of Šibenik Jolly (Croatia)

1st Team

- G: Maurita Reid (173-85) of Gospić (Croatia)
- G: Nika Barič (169-92) of Merkur Celje (Slovenia)
- F: Neda Lokas (182-85) of Šibenik (Croatia)
- F/C: Michelle Maslowski (188-79) of Gospić (Croatia)
- C: Ana Turčinović (190-93) of Merkur Celje (Slovenia)

2nd Team

- G: Dajana Butulija (175-86) of Partizan (Serbia)
- G: Jelena Ivezić (184-84) of Gospić (Croatia)
- F: Gordana Bedalov (193-84) of Medveščak (Croatia)
- F/C: Kristina Baltić (187-90) of Maribor (Slovenia)
- C: Marija Vrsaljko (195-89) of Gospić (Croatia)

Honorable Mention

- Britany Miller (193-C-87) of Novi Zagreb (Croatia)
- Petra Štampalija (190-C-80) of Šibenik (Croatia)
- Nataša Popović (190-C-82) of Jedinstvo Bijelo Polje (Montenegro)
- Ana Krstović (187-C-83) of Voždovac (Serbia)
- Kristina Baltić (187-F/C-90) of Maribor (Slovenia)
- Ljubica Kure (178-G-81) of Maribor (Slovenia)

All-European Players Team

- G: Dajana Butulija (175-86) of Partizan (Serbia)
- G: Nika Barič (169-92) of Merkur Celje (Slovenia)
- F: Neda Lokas (182-85) of Šibenik Jolly (Croatia)
- F/C: Kristina Baltić (187-90) of Maribor (Slovenia)
- C: Ana Turčinović (190-93) of Merkur Celje (Slovenia)
