= 2015–16 MŽRKL Group B =

Group B of the MŽRKL took place between 7 October 2015 and it will end on 23 December 2015.

The three best ranked teams advanced to the League 6.

== Standings ==
| Place | Team | Pld | W | L | PF | PA | Diff | Pts | |
|---|---|---|---|---|---|---|---|---|---|
| 1. | (Montenegro) Budućnost Bemax | 8 | 8 | 0 | 598 | 506 | +92 | 16 | League 6 |
| 2. | (Croatia) Kvarner | 8 | 6 | 2 | 562 | 488 | +74 | 14 | League 6 |
| 3. | (Bosnia and Herzegovina) Čelik Zenica | 8 | 3 | 5 | 521 | 520 | +1 | 11 | League 6 |
| 4. | (Slovenia) Athlete Celje | 8 | 3 | 5 | 599 | 582 | +17 | 11 | |
| 5. | (Croatia) Trešnjevka 2009 | 8 | 0 | 8 | 443 | 627 | -184 | 8 | |

== Fixtures and results ==
All times given below are in Central European Time.

=== Game 1 ===
7 October 2015
18:00

Report

| Čelik Zenica | 60–59 | Trešnjevka 2009 |
Scoring by quarter: 11:19, 6:17, 20:14, 23:9
| Pts: Mitrašević 16; Rebs: Popović 16; Asts: Kapor 4 | | Pts: Skara 17; Rebs: Stojsavljević, Salopek 6 Asts: Packovski, Plavljanin 6 |

Arena Zenica, Zenica
Attendance: 100
Referees: Savović, Vujičić, Šutulović

8 October 2015
18:00

Report

| Athlete Celje | 70–83 | Budućnost Bemax |
Scoring by quarter: 14:23, 14:20, 17:19, 25:21
| Pts: Prezelj 26; Rebs: Gajić 17; Asts: Dojkić, Potočnik 4 | | Pts: Matović 25; Rebs: Matović, McLean 8 Asts: Popović 9 |

Dvorana Gimnazije Celje – Center, Celje
Attendance: 200
Referees: Prpić, Palavra, Marunica

=== Game 2 ===
14 October 2015
20:00

Report

| Trešnjevka 2009 | 54–77 | Budućnost Bemax |
Scoring by quarter: 13:28, 11:22, 19:12, 11:15
| Pts: Stojsavljević 17; Rebs: Salopek 7 Asts: Salopek 7 | | Pts: Matović 26; Rebs: McLean 10; Asts: Popović 10 |

Dom Sportova, Zagreb
Attendance: 100
Referees: Lovšin, Kolar, Župančić

15 October 2015
18:00

Report

| Kvarner | 86–59 | Athlete Celje |
Scoring by quarter: 28:20, 26:12, 12:10, 20:17
| Pts: Tomljenović 21; Rebs: Tomljenović 8 Asts: Perić 7 | | Pts: Ivana Dojkić 16; Rebs: three players 3 Asts: six players 1 |

Dvorana Mladosti, Rijeka
Attendance: 100
Referees: Adamović, Babić, Šabot

=== Game 3 ===
22 October 2015
18:00

Report

| Athlete Celje | 78–73 | Čelik Zenica |
Scoring by quarter: 21:19, 13:18, 21:19, 23:17
| Pts: Gajić 25; Rebs: Gajić 14; Asts: Dojkić 5 | | Pts: Kapor 31; Rebs: Popović 14; Asts: Kapor, Iriškić 5 |

Dvorana Gimnazije Celje – Center, Celje
Attendance: 100
Referees: Prpić, Glavurdić, Marunica

22 October 2015
19:00

Report

| Budućnost Bemax | 64–47 | Kvarner |
Scoring by quarter: 20:8, 17:14, 10:18, 17:7
| Pts: Popović 28; Rebs: Mujović, Raković 6 Asts: Mujović 6 | | Pts: Šerić 10; Rebs: Tomljenović 10; Asts: Marjanović, Šesnić 2 |

Morača Sports Center, Podgorica
Attendance: 150
Referees: Terzievski, Mijalkovski, Piljafov

=== Game 4 ===
28 October 2015
20:00

Report

| Trešnjevka 2009 | 50–71 | Kvarner |
Scoring by quarter: 18:19, 8:26, 15:13, 9:13
| Pts: Packovski 17; Rebs: Stojsavljević, Skara 6 Asts: Salopek, Plavljanin 5 | | Pts: Šesnić 24; Rebs: three players 7 Asts: Šerić 9 |

Športska dvorana Trešnjevka, Zagreb
Attendance: 100
Referees: Marunica, Peić, Glavurdić

28 October 2015
18:00

Report

| Čelik Zenica | 63–69 | Budućnost Bemax |
Scoring by quarter: 13:14, 13:21, 19:17, 18:17
| Pts: Kapor 23; Rebs: N. Popović 11; Asts: N. Popović 4 | | Pts: J. Popović 22; Rebs: Raković, McLean 8 Asts: Mujović 3 |

Arena Zenica, Zenica
Attendance: 400
Referees: Jevtović, Milovanović, Prpa

=== Game 5 ===
5 November 2015
18:00

Report

| Athlete Celje | 102–56 | Trešnjevka 2009 |
Scoring by quarter: 29:11, 25:11, 18:14, 30:20
| Pts: Gajić 23; Rebs: Gajić 12; Asts: Dojkić 10 | | Pts: Plavljanin 16; Rebs: Erjavec 6 Asts: Erjavec 4 |

Dvorana Gimnazije Celje – Center, Celje
Attendance: 100
Referees: Adamović, Babić, Sobot

4 November 2015
18:00

Report

| Kvarner | 58–56 (OT) | Čelik Zenica |
Scoring by quarter: 15:21, 17:10, 8:13, 11:7, Overtime: 7:5
| Pts: Šerić 12; Rebs: Šesnić 14; Asts: Šesnić 5 | | Pts: Iriškić, Kapor 12; Rebs: Nataša Popović 16; Asts: Iriškić 3 |

Dvorana Mladosti, Rijeka
Attendance: 50
Referees: Lovšin, Kolar, Javor

=== Game 6 ===
11 November 2015
20:00

Report

| Trešnjevka 2009 | 56–75 | Čelik Zenica |
Scoring by quarter: 14:22, 9:16, 13:20, 20:17
| Pts: Packovski 19; Rebs: Krajačić 7 Asts: Packovski 6 | | Pts: Iriškić 21; Rebs: Popović 18; Asts: Popović, Kapor 6 |

Dom sportova, Zagreb
Attendance: 50
Referees: Lovšin, Župančić, Grbić

12 November 2015
19:00

Report

| Budućnost Bemax | 79–77 | Athlete Celje |
Scoring by quarter: 15:23, 24:20, 27:16, 13:18
| Pts: Popović 21; Rebs: Matović 7 Asts: Mujović 8 | | Pts: Dojkić 17; Rebs: Gajić 18; Asts: Dojkić 7 |

Morača Sports Center, Podgorica
Attendance: 250
Referees: Cvetanovski, Mihajlović, Antovski

=== Game 7 ===
3 December 2015
19:00

Report

| Budućnost Bemax | 80–62 | Trešnjevka 2009 |
Scoring by quarter: 23:14, 27:17, 23:8, 7:23
| Pts: Henry 16; Rebs: Vučetić 19; Asts: Popović 10 | | Pts: Packovski 17; Rebs: Kelava 20; Asts: Packovski 4 |

Morača Sports Center, Podgorica
Attendance: 150
Referees: Marić, Čavor, Karačić

3 December 2015
18:00

Report

| Athlete Celje | 73–79 (OT) | Kvarner |
Scoring by quarter: 14:17, 17:15, 21:19, 15:16, Overtime: 6:12
| Pts: Jakovina 19; Rebs: Dojkić 6 Asts: Dojkić 6 | | Pts: Perić 19; Rebs: Tomljenović 10; Asts: Tomljenović 4 |

Dvorana Gimnazije Celje – Center, Celje
Attendance: 100
Referees: Avdić, Nožinović, Lasetović

=== Game 8 ===
9 December 2015
18:00

Report

| Čelik Zenica | 74–65 | Athlete Celje |
Scoring by quarter: 19:17, 24:18, 10:15, 21:15
| Pts: Kalušić 19; Rebs: Popović 12; Asts: Iriškić 6 | | Pts: Trebec 13; Rebs: Marić, Slonjšak 9 Asts: Dojkić, Slonjšak 4 |

Arena Zenica, Zenica
Attendance: 300
Referees: Jevtović, Ninković, Arsenijević

9 December 2015
18:00

Report

| Kvarner | 70–75 | Budućnost Bemax |
Scoring by quarter: 21:16, 12:23, 20:23, 17:13
| Pts: Tomljenović 18; Rebs: Tomljenović 7 Asts: Tomljenović 6 | | Pts: Matović 30; Rebs: Matović 10; Asts: Popović 5 |

Športska dvorana Dinko Lukarić, Rijeka
Attendance: 80
Referees: Lovšin, Kolar, Župančić

=== Game 9 ===
16 December 2015
18:00

Report

| Kvarner | 87–54 | Trešnjevka 2009 |
Scoring by quarter: 22:21, 25:9, 23:5, 17:19
| Pts: Miletić 22; Rebs: Blažević 12; Asts: Šerić 8 | | Pts: Dobroslavić 24; Rebs: Stojsavljevič 15; Asts: Pačkovski 5 |

Športska dvorana Dinko Lukarić, Rijeka
Attendance: 100
Referees: Terlević, Stanković, Šverko

17 December 2015
19:00

Report

| Budućnost Bemax | 71–63 | Čelik Zenica |
Scoring by quarter: 14:15, 20:16, 16:16, 21:16
| Pts: Matović 18; Rebs: Matović, Raković 6 Asts: Mujović 4 | | Pts: Kapor 20; Rebs: N. Popović 15; Asts: N. Popović 3 |

Morača Sports Center, Podgorica
Attendance: 450
Referees: Mijalkovski, Klincarov, Lalkov

=== Game 10 ===
23 December 2015
20:00

Report

| Trešnjevka 2009 | 52–75 | Athlete Celje |
Scoring by quarter: 13:16, 14:18, 7:23, 18:18
| Pts: Erjavec, Pačkovski 12; Rebs: Kelava 8 Asts: Erjavec 11 | | Pts: Marić, Prezelj 16; Rebs: Ocvirk, Slonjšak 11; Asts: Slonjšak 5 |

ŠD Peščenica, Zagreb
Attendance: 50
Referees: Karović, Durmić, Luković

23 December 2015
18:00

Report

| Čelik Zenica | 57–64 | Kvarner |
Scoring by quarter: 13:10, 22:18, 18:14, 4:22
| Pts: Iriškić 16; Rebs: Popović 12; Asts: Kalušić 4 | | Pts: Tomljenović 17; Rebs: Miletić, Tomljenović 8 Asts: Šerić 5 |

Arena Zenica, Zenica
Attendance: 250
Referees: Vesković, Pecelj, Jovičin
