= 2009–10 IWBL League =

- League: IWBL League
- Sport: Basketball
- Duration: 10 October 2009 – 13 March 2010
- Games: 94
- Teams: 10

2009–10
- Season champions: Gospić Croatia Osiguranje (2nd title)
- Season MVP: (Croatia) Jelena Ivezić

WABA League seasons
- ← 2008–09 2010–11 →

The 2009–10 IWBL League was the ninth season of the WABA League. The study included ten teams from five states, and the winner has become the team Gospić Croatia Osiguranje. In this season participating clubs from Serbia, Montenegro, Bosnia and Herzegovina, Croatia and from Slovenia.

IWBL League for the season 2009–10 has begun to play 10 October 2009 and ended on 22 February 2010, when he it was completed a Regular season. Final Four to be played from 12–13 March 2010. in Gospić, Croatia. Winner Final Four this season for the team Gospić Croatia Osiguranje from Croatia.

== Team information ==
| Country | Teams | Team | City | Venue (Capacity) |
|---|---|---|---|---|
| Croatia | 4 | | | |
| Croatia | 4 | Gospić Croatia Osiguranje | Gospić | Gradska Školska Sportska Dvorana (2,000) |
| Croatia | 4 | Šibenik Jolly | Šibenik | Dvorana Baldekin (1,500) |
| Croatia | 4 | Medveščak | Zagreb | ŠD Peščenica (600) |
| Croatia | 4 | Ragusa Dubrovnik | Dubrovnik | Športska dvorana Gospino polje (1,400) |
| Slovenia | 3 | | | |
| Slovenia | 3 | Merkur Celje | Celje | Dvorana Gimnazije Celje - Center (1,500) |
| Slovenia | 3 | AJM Maribor | Maribor | Tabor Hall (3,800) |
| Slovenia | 3 | HIT Kranjska Gora | Kranjska Gora | Dvorana Vitranc (600) |
| Bosnia and Herzegovina | 1 | | | |
| Bosnia and Herzegovina | 1 | Mladi Krajišnik | Banja Luka | Sports hall Obilićevo (800) |
| Serbia | 1 | | | |
| Serbia | 1 | Vojvodina NIS | Novi Sad | SPC Vojvodina (1,030) |
| Montenegro | 1 | Jedinstvo Bijelo Polje | Bijelo Polje | Nikoljac (2,000) |

== Regular season ==
The League of the season was played with 10 teams and play a dual circuit system, each with each one game at home and away. The four best teams at the end of the regular season were placed in the Final Four. The regular season began on 10 October 2009 and it will end on 20 February 2010.

| Place | Team | Pld | W | L | PF | PA | Diff | Pts | |
|---|---|---|---|---|---|---|---|---|---|
| 1. | Gospić Croatia Osiguranje | 18 | 18 | 0 | 1610 | 1089 | +521 | 36 | Final Four |
| 2. | (Croatia) Šibenik Jolly | 18 | 16 | 2 | 1347 | 1065 | +282 | 34 | Final Four |
| 3. | (Slovenia) Merkur Celje | 18 | 11 | 7 | 1286 | 1229 | +57 | 29 | Final Four |
| 4. | (Bosnia and Herzegovina) Mladi Krajišnik | 18 | 9 | 9 | 1196 | 1156 | +40 | 27 | Final Four |
| 5. | (Slovenia) HIT Kranjska Gora | 18 | 8 | 10 | 1111 | 1063 | +48 | 26 | |
| 6. | (Montenegro) Jedinstvo Bijelo Polje | 18 | 8 | 10 | 1123 | 1131 | -8 | 26 | |
| 7. | (Serbia) Vojvodina NIS | 18 | 6 | 12 | 1145 | 1291 | -146 | 24 | |
| 8. | (Croatia) Medveščak | 18 | 6 | 12 | 1171 | 1327 | -156 | 24 | |
| 9. | (Slovenia) AJM Maribor | 18 | 4 | 14 | 1125 | 1160 | -35 | 22 | |
| 10. | (Croatia) Ragusa Dubrovnik | 18 | 4 | 14 | 1059 | 1562 | -503 | 22 | |

1. round
| (10.10.) | Ragusa - Medvešćak | 64:53 |
| (10.10.) | Šibenik - Hit Kran. Gora | 68:57 |
| (10.10.) | Gospić - Mladi Krajišnik | 87:59 |
| (10.10.) | Jedinstvo - Maribor | 82:67 |
| (10.10.) | Celje - Vojvodina | 58:46 |

2. round
| (18.10.) | Hit Kran. Gora - Medvešćak | 60:46 |
| (18.10.) | Vojvodina - Ragusa | 76:61 |
| (18.10.) | Mladi Krajišnik - Celje | 64:69 |
| (17.10.) | Gospić - Maribor | 49:73 |
| (17.10.) | Šibenik - Jedinstvo | 65:58 |

3. round
| (25.10.) | Jedinstvo - Hit Kran. Gora | 85:73 |
| (25.10.) | Ragusa - Mladi Krajišnik | 60:53 |
| (24.10.) | Gospić - Šibenik | 84:71 |
| (24.10.) | Celje - Maribor | 79:78 OT |
| (24.10.) | Medvešćak - Vojvodina | 93:74 |

4. round
| (31.10.) | Gospić - Jedinstvo | 86:53 |
| (31.10.) | Hit Kran. Gora - Vojvodina | 90:56 |
| (31.10.) | Maribor - Ragusa | 71:62 |
| (31.10.) | Mladi Krajišnik - Medvešćak | 83:70 |
| (30.10.) | Šibenik - Celje | 65:48 |

5. round
| (8.11.) | Celje - Jedinstvo | 87:84 OT |
| (7.11.) | Gospić - Hit Kran.Gora | 80:63 |
| (7.11.) | Ragusa - Šibenik | 80:81 |
| (7.11.) | Medvešćak - Maribor | 70:68 |
| (7.11.) | Vojvodina - Mladi Krajišnik | 69:71 |

6. round
| (14.11.) | Hit Kran.Gora - Mladi Krajišnik | 66:65 |
| (14.11.) | Maribor - Vojvodina | 68:76 |
| (14.11.) | Šibenik - Medvešćak | 65:62 |
| (14.11.) | Jedinstvo - Ragusa | 87:77 |
| (14.11.) | Gospić - Celje | 88:69 |

7. round
| (21.11.) | Celje - Hit Kran.Gora | 62:53 |
| (21.11.) | Ragusa - Gospić | 49:93 |
| (21.11.) | Medvešćak - Jedinstvo | 75:73 |
| (21.11.) | Vojvodina - Šibenik | 52:69 |
| (21.11.) | Mladi Krajišnik - Maribor | 81:50 |

8. round
| (29.11.) | Jedinstvo - Vojvodina | 70:45 |
| (28.11.) | Gospić - Medvešćak | 113:53 |
| (28.11.) | Celje - Ragusa | 88:81 |
| (28.11.) | Hit Kran.Gora - Celje | 72:63 |
| (28.11.) | Šibenik - Mladi Krajišnik | 76:64 |

9. round
| (7.12.) | Maribor - Šibenik | 58:78 |
| (6.12.) | Medvešćak - Celje | 77:69 |
| (5.12.) | Vojvodina - Gospić | 58:97 |
| (5.12.) | Mladi Krajišnik - Jeidnstvo | 65:56 |
| (5.12.) | Ragusa - Hit Kran.Gora | 75:72 |

10. round
| (11.1.) | Maribor - Jedinstvo | 20:0 |
| (12.12.) | Hit Kran.Gora - Šibenik | 48:52 |
| (12.12.) | Vojvodina - Celje | 57:66 |
| (12.12.) | Medvešćak - Ragusa | 70:73 OT |
| (11.12.) | Mladi Krajišnik - Gospić | 63:77 |

11. round
| (4.2.) | Ragusa - Vojvodina | 54:104 |
| (19.12.) | Celje - Mladi Krajišnik | 54:59 |
| (19.12.) | Gospić - Maribor | 101:85 |
| (19.12.) | Jedinstvo - Šibenik | 35:80 |
| (19.12.) | Medvešćak - Hit Kran.Gora | 59:56 |

12. round
| (2.2.) | Mladi Krajišnik - Ragusa | 111:50 |
| (13.1.) | Hit Kran.Gora - Jedinstvo | 20:0 |
| (9.1.) | Vojvodina - Medvešćak | 67:58 |
| (9.1.) | Maribor - Celje | 74:81 |
| (9.1.) | Šibenik - Gospić | 80:90 |

13. round
| (10.2.) | Jedinstvo - Gospić | 65:90 |
| (17.1.) | Celje - Šibenik | 62:79 |
| (17.1.) | Medvešćak - Mladi Krajišnik | 73:65 |
| (16.1.) | Ragusa - Maribor | 82:100 |
| (16.1.) | Vojvodina - Hit Kran.Gora | 64:60 |

14. round
| (24.1.) | Mladi Krajišnik - Vojvodina | 57:48 |
| (23.1.) | Jedinstvo - Celje | 52:68 |
| (23.1.) | Maribor - Medvešćak | 73:57 |
| (23.1.) | Šibenik - Ragusa | 108:29 |
| (23.1.) | Hit Kran.Gora - Gospić | 61:72 |

15. round
| (30.1.) | Mladi Krajišnik - Hit Kran.Gora | 62:57 |
| (30.1.) | Vojvodina - Maribor | 72:68 |
| (30.1.) | Celje - Gospić | 70:85 |
| (30.1.) | Ragusa - Jedinstvo | 42:86 |
| (30.1.) | Medvešćak - Šibenik | 62:73 |

16. round
| (6.2.) | Hit Kran.Gora - Celje | 74:70 |
| (6.2.) | Jedinstvo - Medvešćak | 86:69 |
| (6.2.) | Maribor - Mladi Krajišnik | 42:46 |
| (6.2.) | Gospić - Ragusa | 99:38 |
| (6.2.) | Šibenik - Vojvodina | 79:69 |

17. round
| (13.2.) | Mladi Krajišnik - Šibenik | 53:74 |
| (13.2.) | Vojvodina - Jedinstvo | 59:65 |
| (13.2.) | Maribor - Hit Kran.Gora | 53:64 |
| (13.2.) | Ragusa - Celje | 49:109 |
| (13.2.) | Medvešćak - Gospić | 60:88 |

18. round
| (20.2.) | Hit Kran.Gora - Ragusa | 91:33 |
| (20.2.) | Jedinstvo - Mladi Krajišnik | 78:75 |
| (20.2.) | Gospić - Vojvodina | 107:53 |
| (20.2.) | Celje - Medvešćak | 77:64 |
| (20.2.) | Šibenik - Maribor | 84:54 |

== Final four ==
Final Four to be played from 12–13 March 2010. in the Gradska Školska Sportska Dvorana in Gospić, Croatia.

| club 1 | result | club 2 |
semifinals
| Gospić Croatia Osiguranje | 86:49 | (Bosnia and Herzegovina) Mladi Krajišnik |
| (Croatia) Šibenik Jolly | 86:64 | (Slovenia) Merkur Celje |
for third place
| (Slovenia) Merkur Celje | 69:53 | (Bosnia and Herzegovina) Mladi Krajišnik |
final
| Gospić Croatia Osiguranje | 73:65 | (Croatia) Šibenik Jolly |

2009–10 IWBL League

Gospić Croatia Osiguranje
2nd Title

== Awards ==
- Player of the Year: Jelena Ivezić (184-G-84) of Gospić Croatia Osiguranje
- Guard of the Year: Jelena Ivezić (184-G-84) of Gospić Croatia Osiguranje
- Forward of the Year: Mirna Mazić (188-F-85) of Medveščak (Croatia)
- Center of the Year: Natalia Terglav Tratsiak (195-C-80) of HIT Kranjska Gora (Slovenia)
- Import Player of the Year: Carla Thomas (191-F/C-85) of Gospić Croatia Osiguranje
- European Player of the Year: Jelena Ivezić (184-G-84) of Gospić Croatia Osiguranje
- Defensive Player of the Year: Mirna Mazić (188-F-85) of Medveščak (Croatia)
- Coach of the Year: Stipe Bralić of Gospić Croatia Osiguranje

1st Team

- G: Jelena Ivezić (184-84) of Gospić Croatia Osiguranje
- G: Anda Jelavić (175-80) of Gospić Croatia Osiguranje
- F: Mirna Mazić (188-85) of Medveščak (Croatia)
- F/C: Carla Thomas (191-85) of Gospić Croatia Osiguranje
- C: Natalia Terglav-Tratsiak (195-80) of HIT Kranjska Gora (Slovenia)

2nd Team

- G: Brankica Hadžović (175-81) of Jedinstvo Bijelo Polje (Montenegro)
- F: Lamisha Augustine (186-82) of Gospić Croatia Osiguranje
- F: Stanecia Graham (185-86) of Jedinstvo Bijelo Polje (Montenegro)
- F/C: Nikya Hughes (191-85) of Merkur Celje (Slovenia)
- C: Emina Demirović (186-85) of Mladi Krajišnik (Bosnia and Herzegovina)

Honorable Mention

- Ljubica Kure (178-G-81) of AJM Maribor (Slovenia)
- Eva Komplet (182-F/C-86) of HIT Kranjska Gora (Slovenia)
- Luca Ivanković (200-C-87) of Šibenik Jolly (Croatia)
- Nataša Popović (190-C-82) of Šibenik Jolly (Croatia)
- Jasmina Bigović (174-G-79) of Jedinstvo Bijelo Polje (Montenegro)

All-European Players Team

- G: Jelena Ivezić (184-84) of Gospić Croatia Osiguranje
- G: Anda Jelavić (175-80) of Gospić Croatia Osiguranje
- F: Mirna Mazić (188-85) of Medveščak (Croatia)
- F/C: Eva Komplet (182-86) of HIT Kranjska Gora (Slovenia)
- C: Natalia Terglav Tratsiak (195-80) of HIT Kranjska Gora (Slovenia)
