= 2003–04 EWWL Trocal league =

2003-04 EWWL Trocal league
- League: EWWL Trocal league
- Sport: Basketball
- Games: 114
- Teams: 11

2003–04
- Season champions: (Croatia) Gospić Industrogradnja (1st title)

WABA League seasons
- ← 2002–03 2004–05 →

EWWL Trocal League for the season 2003–04 was the third season of the EWWL Trocal league. Attended by eleven teams from five countries, a champion for the first time in history, became the team Gospić Industrogradnja. In this season, clubs from Serbia and Montenegro, Bosnia and Herzegovina, Croatia, Slovenia and Austria took part.

EWWL Trocal League for the season 2003–04 has begun to play 4 October 2003 and ended on 22 February 2004, when he it was completed a Regular season. Final Four to be played from 12 to 13 March 2004. in Gospić in Croatia. Winner Final Four this season for the team Gospić Croatia Osiguranje from Croatia.

== Team information ==
Country	Teams	Team	City	Venue (Capacity)
Croatia	3			
Croatia	3	Gospić Industrogradnja	Gospić	Gradska Školska Sportska Dvorana (2.000)
Croatia	3	Šibenik Jolly	Šibenik	Dvorana Baldekin (1.500)
Croatia	3	Croatia 2006	Zagreb	ŠD Peščenica (600)
Slovenia	3			
Slovenia	3	Postaja Center	Maribor	Tabor Hall (3.800)
Slovenia	3	Merkur Celje	Celje	Dvorana Gimnazije Celje - Center (1,500)
Slovenia	3	Ježica	Ljubljana	ŠRC Ježica
Bosnia and Herzegovina	3			
Bosnia and Herzegovina	3	Željezničar Sarajevo	Sarajevo	Dvorana Mirza Delibašić (6.500)
Bosnia and Herzegovina	3	Trocal Jedinstvo	Tuzla	SKPC Mejdan (5.000)
Bosnia and Herzegovina	3	Troglav Livno	Livno	
Serbia and Montenegro	1			
Serbia and Montenegro	1	Univerziteti Priština	Priština	
Austria	1			
Austria	1	Gustino Powers	Wels	Raiffeisen Arena (952)

== Regular season ==
The League of the season was played with 11 teams and play a dual circuit system, each with each one game at home and away. The four best teams at the end of the regular season were placed in the Final Four. The regular season began on 4 October 2003 and it will end on 22 February 2004.

Place	Team	Pld	W	L	PF	PA	Diff	Pts	
1.	(Croatia) Gospić Industrogradnja	20	18	2	1590	1338	+252	38	Final Four
2.	(Croatia) Šibenik Jolly JBS	20	17	3	1540	1266	+274	37	Final Four
3.	(Serbia and Montenegro) Univerziteti Priština	20	15	5	1429	1350	+79	35	Final Four
4.	Croatia 2006	20	14	6	1364	1251	+113	34	Final Four
5.	(Slovenia) Merkur Celje	20	12	8	1383	1276	+107	32	
6.	(Bosnia and Herzegovina) Željezničar Sarajevo	20	11	9	1455	1455	+0	31	
7.	(Slovenia) Postaja Center	20	6	14	1136	1486	-350	26	
8.	(Bosnia and Herzegovina) Trocal Jedinstvo	20	6	14	1238	1448	-210	26	
9.	(Slovenia) Ježica	20	4	16	1145	1267	-122	24	
10.	(Austria) Gustino Powers	20	4	16	1129	1297	-169	24	
11.	(Bosnia and Herzegovina) Troglav Livno	20	1	19	683	851	-168	21	excluded

== Final four ==
Final Four to be played from 12 to 13 March 2004. in the Gradska Školska Sportska Dvorana in Gospić, Croatia.

club 1	result	club 2
semifinals
(Croatia) Gospić Industrogradnja	95:76	Croatia 2006
(Croatia) Šibenik Jolly JBS	81:64	(Serbia and Montenegro) Univerziteti Priština
for third place
Croatia 2006	87:81	(Serbia and Montenegro) Univerziteti Priština
final
(Croatia) Gospić Industrogradnja	59:58	(Croatia) Šibenik Jolly JBS

2003–04 EWWL Trocal league

Gospić Industrogradnja
1st Title

== Awards ==
- Finals Four MVP: Vanda Baranović-Urukalo of Gospić Industrogradnja (Croatia)
