= 2004–05 EWWL Trocal League =

2004-05 EWWL Trocal league
- League: EWWL Trocal league
- Sport: Basketball
- Games: 76
- Teams: 9

2004–05
- Season champions: (Croatia) Šibenik Jolly (1st title)
- Season MVP: (Croatia) Anđa Jelavić (Croatia) Vanda Baranović-Urukalo (Serbia and Montenegro) Jelena Dubljević
- Top scorer: (Serbia and Montenegro) Anica Tešić

MŽRKL seasons
- ← 2003–04 2005–06 →

EWWL Trocal League for the season 2004–05 was the fourth season of the WABA League, a top-level regional female basketball league. Attended by nine teams from four countries, Šibenik Jolly became the champion for the first time in history. The season featured clubs participating from Bosnia and Herzegovina, Croatia, Slovenia, Macedonia and Austria.

== Team information ==
Country	Teams	Team	City	Venue (Capacity)
Croatia	3			
Croatia	3	Gospić Croatia Osiguranje	Gospić	Gradska Školska Sportska Dvorana (2,000)
Croatia	3	Šibenik Jolly	Šibenik	Dvorana Baldekin (1,500)
Croatia	3	Croatia 2006	Zagreb	ŠD Peščenica (600)
Serbia and Montenegro	2			
Serbia and Montenegro	2	Budućnost	Podgorica	Morača Sports Center (4,570)
Serbia and Montenegro	2	Vojvodina NIS	Novi Sad	SPC Vojvodina (1,030)
Slovenia	2			
Slovenia	2	Maribor	Maribor	Tabor Hall (3.800)
Slovenia	2	Merkur Celje	Celje	Dvorana Gimnazije Celje - Center (1,500)
Bosnia and Herzegovina	1			
Bosnia and Herzegovina	1	Željezničar Sarajevo	Sarajevo	Mala dvorana KSC Skenderija (800)
(North Macedonia) Macedonia	1			
(North Macedonia) Macedonia	1	Kimiko	Struga	

== Regular season ==
The League of the season was played with 9 teams and play a dual circuit system, each with each one game at home and away. The four best teams at the end of the regular season were placed in the Final Four.

Place	Team	Pld	W	L	Pts	
1.	.	16	.	.	.	Final Four
2.	.	16	.	.	.	Final Four
3.	.	16	.	.	.	Final Four
4.	.	16	.	.	.	Final Four
5.	(Slovenia) Athlete Celje	16	9	7	25	
6.	.	16	.	.	.	
7.	.	16	.	.	.	
8.	(Serbia and Montenegro) Budućnost Podgorica	16	3	15	21	
9.	.	16	.	.	.	

== Final four ==
Final Four to be played 15 and 16 February 2005 in the Dvorana Baldekin in Šibenik, Croatia.

club 1	result	club 2
semifinals
(Croatia) Šibenik Jolly JBS	80:77	(Bosnia and Herzegovina) Željezničar Sarajevo
(Croatia) Gospić Industrogradnja	87:76	(Serbia and Montenegro) Vojvodina NIS
for third place
(Serbia and Montenegro) Vojvodina NIS	75:66	(Bosnia and Herzegovina) Željezničar Sarajevo
final
(Croatia) Šibenik Jolly JBS	82:66	(Croatia) Gospić Industrogradnja

2004–05 EWWL Trocal League

Šibenik Jolly JBS
1st Title

== Awards ==
- Finals MVP: Ivona Bogoje (193-C-76) of Šibenik Jolly (Croatia)
- Player of the Year (MVP):
- Anđa Jelavić (172-SG-80) of Šibenik Jolly (Croatia)
- Vanda Baranović-Urukalo of Gospić Croatia Osiguranje
- Jelena Dubljević (188-SM-87) of Budućnost Podgorica (Serbia and Montenegro)
- Top scorer: Anica Tešić of Željezničar Sarajevo (Bosnia and Herzegovina)

1st Team

- Anđa Jelavić (172-SG-80) of Šibenik Jolly (Croatia)
- Jelena Dubljević (188-SM-87) Budućnost Podgorica (Serbia and Montenegro)
- Mensura Hadžić (173-G-70) of Željezničar Sarajevo (Bosnia and Herzegovina)
- Lidija Milkova (193-C-70) of Kimiko (North Macedonia)
- Maja Drozg (179-C-81) of Maribor (Slovenia)
