= 2008 Vojko Herksel Cup =

- League: Vojko Herksel Cup
- Sport: Basketball
- Duration: 3 – 5 October 2008

2008
- Season champions: (Croatia) Gospić CO (1st title)
- Season MVP: Marija Vrsaljko

Vojko Herksel Cup seasons
- ← 2007 2009 →

The 2008 Vojko Herksel Cup was the 3rd Vojko Herksel Cup whose groups were held which took place at several venues across ex-Yugoslavia. In the Vojko Herksel Cup played 9 teams. Šibenik, a past winner of seasonal regional league, is secured directly to the final tournament, while the remaining 8 teams were divided into 3 groups, whose winners have secured the final tournament. The final tournament was held in Šibenik in Hall Baldekin.

== Groups ==
=== Group A ===
Group A is played in Gospić, Croatia

Place	Team	Pld	W	L	PF	PA	Diff	Pts	
1.	(Croatia) Gospić CO	0	0	0	0	0	0	0	Final tournament
2.	(Croatia) Medveščak	0	0	0	0	0	0	0	
3.	(Slovenia) Athlete Celje	0	0	0	0	0	0	0	

=== Group B ===
Group B is played in Banja Luka, Bosnia and Herzegovina

Place	Team	Pld	W	L	PF	PA	Diff	Pts	
1.	(Bosnia and Herzegovina) Mladi Krajišnik	0	0	0	0	0	0	0	Final tournament
2.	(Serbia) Vojvodina	0	0	0	0	0	0	0	

=== Group C ===
Group C is played in Podgorica, Montenegro

Place	Team	Pld	W	L	PF	PA	Diff	Pts	
1.	(Montenegro) Jedinstvo Bijelo Polje	0	0	0	0	0	0	0	Final tournament
2.	(Montenegro) Budućnost Podgorica	0	0	0	0	0	0	0	
3.	(Croatia) Ragusa PGM	0	0	0	0	0	0	0	

== Final tournament ==
Semi-finals
3 October
(Croatia) Šibenik Jolly	!
(Montenegro) Jedinstvo Bijelo Polje	!
3 October
(Croatia) Gospić CO	!
(Bosnia and Herzegovina) Mladi Krajišnik	!

Final
5 October
(Croatia) Šibenik Jolly	74
(Croatia) Gospić CO	77
Third place
5 October
(Montenegro) Jedinstvo Bijelo Polje	!
(Bosnia and Herzegovina) Mladi Krajišnik	!

== Awards ==
- MVP: (Croatia) Marija Vrsaljko
