= 2002–03 EWWL League =

- League: EWWL League
- Sport: Basketball
- Games: 60
- Teams: 8

2002–03
- Season champions: (Bosnia and Herzegovina) Željezničar Sarajevo (1st title)

WABA League seasons
- ← 2001–02 2003–04 →

The 2002–03 season of EWWL League was the second season of the WABA League. Attended by eight teams from four countries, a champion for the first time in history, became the team Željezničar Sarajevo. Clubs from Bosnia and Herzegovina, Croatia, Slovenia and Austria participated in this season.

== Team information ==
Country	Teams	Team	City	Venue (Capacity)
Croatia	3			
Croatia	3	Gospić Industrogradnja	Gospić	Gradska Školska Sportska Dvorana (2.000)
Croatia	3	Šibenik Jolly	Šibenik	Dvorana Baldekin (1.500)
Croatia	3	Montmontaža Zagreb	Zagreb	Športska dvorana Trešnjevka (5.000)
Slovenia	2			
Slovenia	2	Merkur Celje	Celje	Dvorana Gimnazije Celje - Center (1,500)
Slovenia	2	Lek Ježica	Ljubljana	ŠRC Ježica (300)
Bosnia and Herzegovina	2			
Bosnia and Herzegovina	2	Željezničar Sarajevo	Sarajevo	Dvorana Mirza Delibašić (6.500)
Bosnia and Herzegovina	2	Trocal Jedinstvo	Tuzla	SKPC Mejdan (5.000)
Austria	1			
Austria	1	Gustino Powers	Wels	Raiffeisen Arena (952)

== Regular season ==
The League of the season was played with 8 teams and play a dual circuit system, each with each one game at home and away. The four best teams at the end of the regular season were placed in the Final Four.

Place	Team	Pld	W	L	PF	PA	Diff	Pts	
1.	(Croatia) Gospić Industrogradnja	14	.	.	.	.	.	.	Final Four
2.	(Croatia) Šibenik Jolly JBS	14	.	.	.	.	.	.	Final Four
3.	(Slovenia) Merkur Celje	14	10	4	.	.	.	24	Final Four
4.	(Bosnia and Herzegovina) Željezničar Sarajevo	14	.	.	.	.	.	.	Final Four
5.	.	14	.	.	.	.	.	.	
6.	.	14	.	.	.	.	.	.	
7.	.	14	.	.	.	.	.	.	
8.	.	14	.	.	.	.	.	.	

== Final four ==
Final Four to be played 24 and 25 January 2003 in the Dvorana Mirza Delibašić in Sarajevo, Bosnia and Herzegovina.

club 1	result	club 2
semifinals
(Croatia) Gospić Industrogradnja	76:79	(Croatia) Šibenik Jolly JBS
(Bosnia and Herzegovina) Željezničar Sarajevo	70:61	(Slovenia) Merkur Celje
for third place
(Croatia) Gospić Industrogradnja	52:65	(Slovenia) Merkur Celje
final
(Bosnia and Herzegovina) Željezničar Sarajevo	84:78	(Croatia) Šibenik Jolly JBS

2002–03 EWWL League

Željezničar Sarajevo
1st Title

== Awards ==
- Finals MVP: Mirna Deak of Željezničar Sarajevo (Bosnia and Herzegovina)
