= Anić =

Anić is a Croatian and Serbian surname. The surname may refer to:

- Ante (Antun) Anić (1876–1953), Croatian writer and politician
- Antonela Anić (born 1985), Croatian basketball player
- Boško Anić (born 1968), Croatian footballer
- Damir Anić (1944–1992), Croatian gymnast
- Darko Anić (chess player) (b. 1957), Croatian chess grandmaster
- Darko Anić (footballer) (b. 1974), retired Serbian football player
- Franka Anić (b. 1991), Slovenian-Croatian taekwondo athlete
- Igor Anić (born 1987), French handball player of Herzegovinian origin
- Lazar Anić (born 1991), Serbian long jumper
- Maja Anić (b. 1988), Croatian rower
- Milan Anić (1906–1968), Croatian forestry expert
- Vladimir Anić (1930–2000), Croatian linguist and lexicographer
- Petar Anić (1927–1990), Croatian economist, one of the founders of Osijek University and its first Rector
