= 2006 WABA Cup =

- League: WABA Cup
- Sport: Basketball
- Duration: 24 –25 November 2006

2006
- Season champions: (Croatia) Šibenik Jolly (1st title)
- Season MVP: Luca Ivanković

Vojko Herksel Cup seasons
- 2007 →

The 2006 WABA Cup was the 1st WABA Cup. Winner of the first edition of the Šibenik Jolly who won Gospić Croatia Osiguranje.

== Final tournament ==
Semi-finals
24 November
(Croatia) Šibenik Jolly	78
(Montenegro) Jedinstvo Bijelo Polje	71
24 November
(Croatia) Gospić CO	76
(Montenegro) Budućnost Podgorica	55

Final
25 November
(Croatia) Šibenik Jolly	72
(Croatia) Gospić CO	69
Third place
25 November
(Montenegro) Jedinstvo Bijelo Polje	61
(Montenegro) Budućnost Podgorica	73

== Awards ==
- MVP: (Croatia) Luca Ivanković
