= Ivona Matić =

Croatian basketball player (born 1986)

Personal information
- Born: 5 September 1986 (age 40) Dubrovnik, SFR Yugoslavia
- Listed height: 1.88 m (6 ft 2 in)

Career information
- WNBA draft: 2008: undrafted
- Position: Power forward / center

Career history
- Athlete Celje
- Pays d'Aix Basket 13
- Gospić
- Novi Zagreb
- Ragusa Drubrovnik
- 2014–2015: San Pieto
- 2015–2016: Keltern
- 2016–present: Bolzano

Ivona Matić (born 5 September 1986 in Dubrovnik, SFR Yugoslavia) is a Croatian female basketball player.
