= Croatian First Women's Basketball League =

First tier level league for women's basketball clubs in Croatia

Croatian Premier Women's Basketball League Premijer ženska košarkaška liga
- Sport: Basketball
- Founded: 1991
- No. of teams: 12
- Country: Croatia
- Continent: Europe
- Most recent champion: ŽKK Brod na Savi (1st title)
- Most titles: ŽKK Gospić (8 titles)
- Domestic cup: Ružica Meglaj-Rimac Cup
- Website: hks-cbf.hr

The Hrvatska Premijer ženska košarkaška liga (English: Croatian Premier Women's Basketball League), also known as Premijer ženska liga or simply Premijer liga, is the first tier level league for women's basketball clubs in Croatia. Founded in 1991 following the independence of the country, it is contested by ten teams.

Currently the champion is granted a spot in the EuroLeague Women.

== Current teams ==
The following 12 teams compete in the 2024–25 season, scheduled to start in September 2024:

Team	Home city	Arena	Capacity
KK Akademija Žana Lelas	Split		
ŽKK Brod na Savi	Slavonski Brod	SD Vijuš	2,200
KK FSV	Rijeka	Dvorana Mladosti	2,960
ŽKK Medveščak	Zagreb	ŠŠD Peščenica	600
ŽKK Plamen Požega	Požega	SD Tomislav Pirc	1,200
ŽKK Pula	Pula	SC Mirna Pattinaggio	2,312
ŽKK Ragusa	Dubrovnik	ŠD Gospino Polje	2,500
ŽKK Šibenik	Šibenik	SD Baldekin	1,500
ŽKK Trešnjevka 2009	Zagreb	ŠD Trešnjevka	1,000
ŽKK Zadar	Zadar	SC Višnjik	300
ŽKK Zadar Plus	Zadar		
ŽKK Zagreb	Zagreb		

== List of champions ==
Season	Champion	Runner-up	Result
1991–92	Split	Montmontaža Zagreb	
1992–93	Split	Montmontaža Zagreb	2–1
1993–94	Split	Centar banka	2–0
1994–95	Centar banka	Montmontaža Zagreb	
1995–96	Centar banka	Montmontaža Zagreb	3–2
1996–97	Šibenik Jolly	Centar banka	3–2
1997–98	Adriatic osiguranje	Šibenik Jolly	3–2
1998–99	Montmontaža Zagreb	Hrvatski Dragovoljac	3–1
1999–00	Gospić	Montmontaža Zagreb	2–0
2000–01	Croatia Zagreb	Gospić	3–1
2001–02	Gospić	Montmontaža Zagreb	3–1
2002–03	Šibenik Jolly	Gospić	
2003–04	Gospić	Šibenik Jolly	3–1
2004–05	Croatia Zagreb	Šibenik Jolly	
2005–06	Gospić	Šibenik Jolly	3–2
2006–07	Šibenik Jolly	Gospić	3–2
2007–08	Šibenik Jolly	Gospić	3–1
2008–09	Gospić	Šibenik Jolly	3–1
2009–10	Gospić	Šibenik Jolly	3–0
2010–11	Gospić	Šibenik Jolly	3–0
2011–12	Gospić	Šibenik Jolly	3–0
2012–13	Novi Zagreb	Gospić	3–2
2013–14	Medveščak	Novi Zagreb	3–1
2014–15	Medveščak	Kvarner	3–2
2015–16	Medveščak	Zadar	3–0
2016–17	Medveščak	Trešnjevka 2009	3–0
2017–18	Medveščak	Trešnjevka 2009	3–0
2018–19	Medveščak	Split	3–1
2019–20	Canceled due to the COVID-19 pandemic.		
2020–21	ŽKK Ragusa	ŽKK Medveščak	3–0
2021–22	ŽKK Ragusa	ŽKK Plamen Požega	3–2
2022–23	ŽKK Ragusa	KK Trešnjevka 2009	3–0
2023–24	ŽKK Ragusa	KK Trešnjevka 2009	3–2
2024–25	ŽKK Ragusa	KK Trešnjevka 2009	3–0
2025–26	ŽKK Brod na Savi	ŽKK Šibenik	3–0

== Titles by club ==
Club	City/town	Winners	Runners-up	Years Won	Years Runner-up
ŽKK Gospić	Gospić	8	5	2000, 2002, 2004, 2006, 2009, 2010, 2011, 2012	2001, 2003, 2007, 2008, 2013
ŽKK Medveščak	Zagreb	6	1	2014, 2015, 2016, 2017, 2018, 2019	2021
ŽKK Croatia 2006	Zagreb	5	2	1995, 1996, 1998, 2001, 2005	1994, 1997
ŽKK Šibenik	Šibenik	4	9	1997, 2003, 2007, 2008	1998, 2004, 2005, 2006, 2009, 2010, 2011, 2012, 2026
ŽKK Ragusa	Dubrovnik	5	–	2021, 2022, 2023, 2024, 2025	–
ŽKK Split	Split	3	1	1992, 1993, 1994	2019
ŽKK Trešnjevka 2009	Zagreb	1	11	1999	1992, 1993, 1995, 1996, 2000, 2002, 2017, 2018, 2023, 2024, 2025
ŽKK Novi Zagreb	Zagreb	1	2	2013	1999, 2014
ŽKK Brod na Savi	Slavonski Brod	1	–	2026	–
ŽKK Kvarner	Rijeka	–	1	–	2015
ŽKK Zadar	Zadar	–	1	–	2016
ŽKK Plamen Požega	Požega	–	1	–	2022
