= Antonija Sandrić =

Croatian basketball player

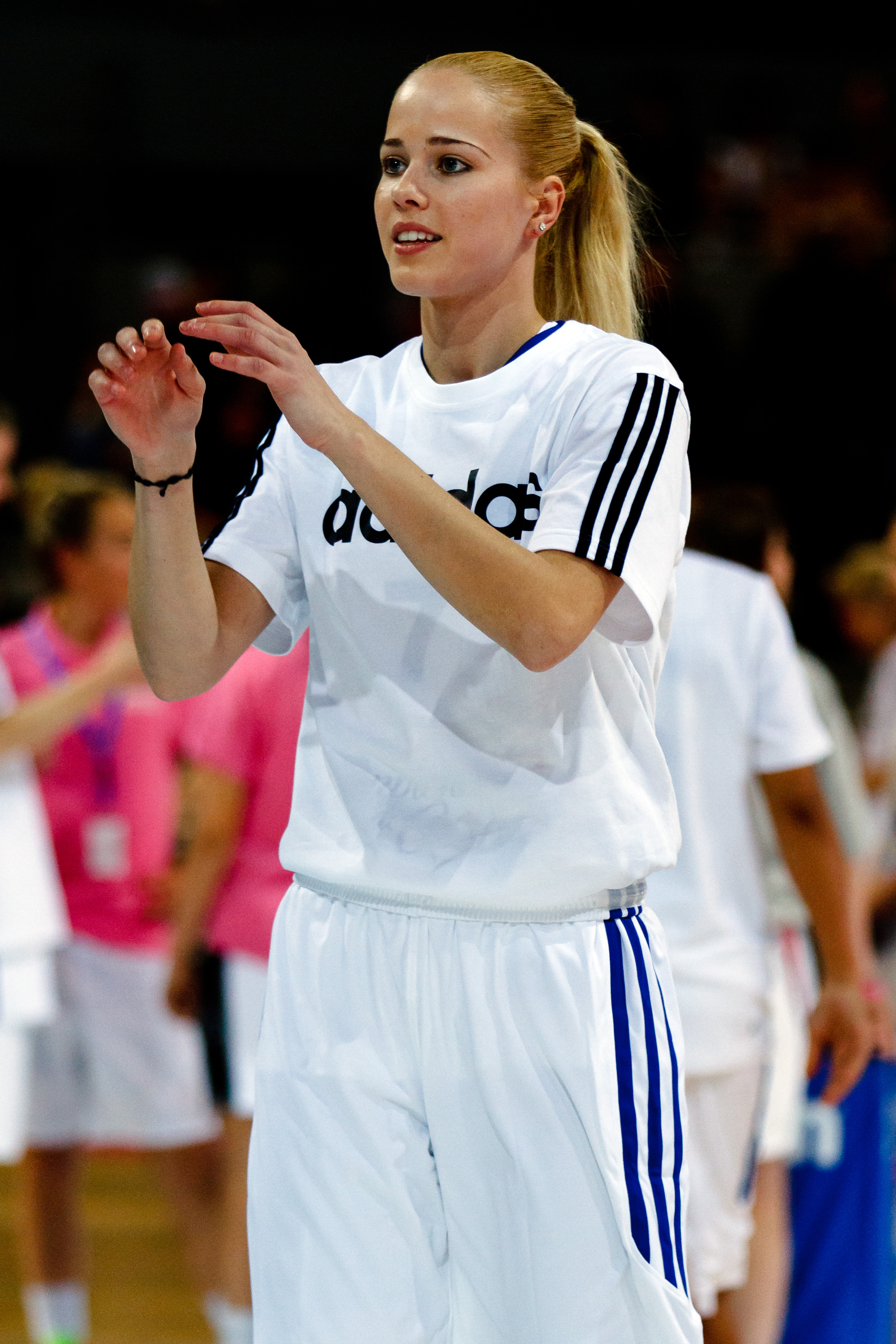
- Sandrić in March 2014

No. 7 – CCC Polkowice
- Position: Point guard
- League: Basket Liga Kobiet

Personal information
- Born: 19 May 1988 (age 38) Šibenik, SR Croatia, SFR Yugoslavia
- Listed height: 1.81 m (5 ft 11 in)
- Listed weight: 65 kg (143 lb)

Career information
- WNBA draft: 2010: undrafted
- Playing career: 2005–present

Career history
- 2005–2007: Vidici Dalmostan
- 2007–2013: Jolly JBS
- 2013–2016: Toulouse Métropole Basket
- 2016: Canik Belediye Samsun
- 2017: Lointek Gernika Bizkaia
- 2017–present: CCC Polkowice
Medals
Women's basketball
Representing Croatia
Mediterranean Games
Bronze medal – third place	2009 Pescara	Team

Antonija Sandrić (born Mišura; 19 May 1988) is a Croatian professional basketball player for CCC Polkowice of the Basket Liga Kobiet and the Croatia national team.

Sandrić has represented the national team in the 2009 Mediterranean Games, EuroBasket Women 2011, 2012 Olympics and EuroBasket Women 2013. She plays as a point guard and shooting guard, and is noted for her quick, aggressive style of play.

== Biography ==
As a girl, Sandrić played a variety of sports in her native town of Šibenik, including volleyball. She was ultimately attracted to basketball, following the example of her older sister, as well as her sports idol Dražen Petrović, also a native of Šibenik. She started her professional career with Vidici Dalmostan in 2005, moving to Jolly JBS in 2007, and winning both the national championship and the Croatian Cup in 2008, in her first season with her new club. In the 2010–11 season, Sandrić averaged 30.0 minutes and 9.0 points per game in the Adriatic League, and 26.0 minutes and 7.3 points per game in the EuroCup, leading her team in assists and steals per game in the Adriatic League with 3.5 and 2.0, respectively.

With the national team, Sandrić won the bronze medal at the 2009 Mediterranean Games, placed fifth in the EuroBasket Women 2011 and tenth in the 2012 Olympics. Due to competition from more experienced players, Sandrić saw limited playing time with the national team in 2011 and 2012, scoring 4.8 points per game in the Eurobasket and 3.3 points per game in the Olympics.

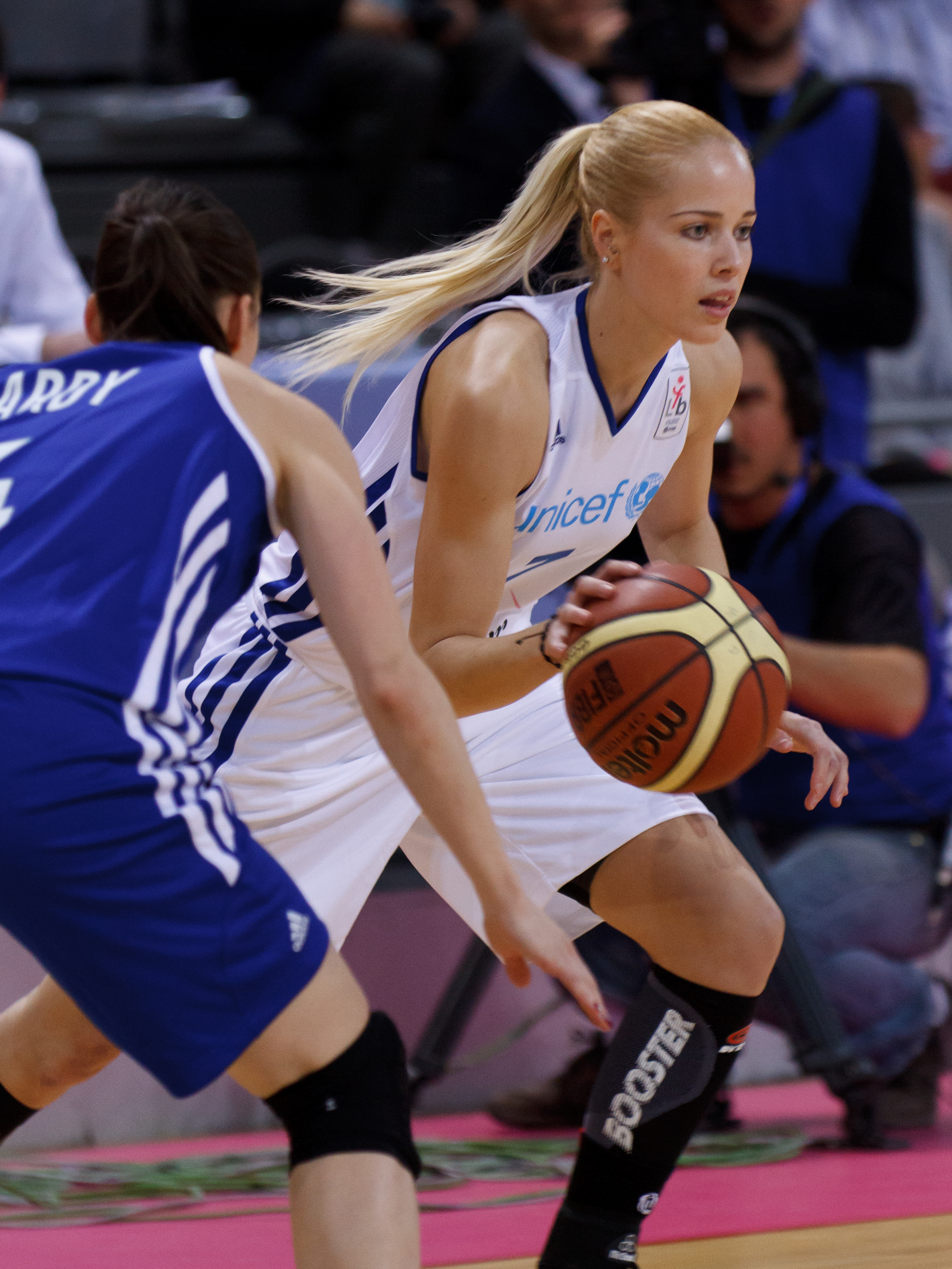
Sandrić in 2014

Sandrić received considerable coverage from media during her basketball career, often focusing on solely on her physical appearance. She was named Miss Mediterranean Games in 2009 in a poll of photographers. Sandrić stated that she found the attention both flattering but annoying. She declined most offers to work as a model, focusing chiefly on her sports career and education.

As of 2012, Sandrić was studying tourism management in Šibenik.

== Personal life ==
In August 2015, she married Croatian basketball player Marko Sandrić, with whom she has two children.
