= Ilisha (disambiguation) =

Ilisha is a genus of ray-finned fishes.

Ilisha may also refer to:

- Tenualosa ilisha, a species of fish known by the common name ilisha
- Ilisha Jarrett (born 1977), American retired basketball player
