= Emanuela Salopek =

Croatian basketball player

Personal information
- Born: April 18, 1987 (age 39) Niš, SR Serbia, SFR Yugoslavia
- Listed height: 1.78 m (5 ft 10 in)
- Listed weight: 66 kg (146 lb)

Career information
- Playing career: 2005–present
- Position: Shooting guard

Career history
- 2005–2007: Montmontaža Zagreb
- 2007–2010: Gospić
- 2010–2011: Šibenik
- 2011–2012: Novi Zagreb
- 2012–2013: Gospić
- 2013–2014: Üniversitesi Kayseri Kaski
- 2014–2015: ASPTT Arras

Emanuela Salopek (born 18 April 1987 in Niš, SFR Yugoslavia) is a Croatian female basketball player. (Note: "Emanuela Salopek". London 2012. The London Organising Committee of the Olympic Games and Paralympic Games Limited.) At the 2012 Summer Olympics, she competed for the Croatia women's national basketball team in the women's event. She is 5 ft 10 inches tall.

== Career ==
- (Croatia) Montmontaža Zagreb (2005–2007), Gospić (2007–2010, 2012–2013), Šibenik (2010–2011), Novi Zagreb (2011–2012)
- (Turkey) Üniversitesi Kayseri Kaski (2013–2014)
- (France) ASPTT Arras (2014–2015)
