= 2009 Vojko Herksel Cup =

- League: Vojko Herksel Cup
- Sport: Basketball
- Duration: 29 – 30 September 2009

2009
- Season champions: (Croatia) Šibenik Jolly (3rd title)

Vojko Herksel Cup seasons
- ← 2008 2010 →

The 2009 Vojko Herksel Cup was the 4th Vojko Herksel Cup. Hold of Final tournament is Gospić. Winner of the four edition of the Šibenik Jolly who won Gospić Croatia Osiguranje. Vojko Herksel Cup was also the traditional Gospić Cup, which was the sixth time in a row.

== Final tournament ==
Semi-finals
29 September
(Croatia) Gospić CO	77
(Slovenia) Merkur Celje	57
29 September
(Croatia) Šibenik Jolly	69
(Montenegro) Jedinstvo Bijelo Polje	41

Final
30 September
(Croatia) Gospić CO	75
(Croatia) Šibenik Jolly	85
Third place
30 September
(Slovenia) Merkur Celje	68
(Montenegro) Jedinstvo Bijelo Polje	76
