= 2010 Vojko Herksel Cup =

- League: Vojko Herksel Cup
- Sport: Basketball
- Duration: 1 – 3 October 2010

2010
- Season champions: (Croatia) Šibenik Jolly (4th title)

Vojko Herksel Cup seasons
- ← 2009

The 2010 Vojko Herksel Cup was the 5th Vojko Herksel Cup. Hold of Final tournament is Gospić. Winner of the five edition of the Šibenik Jolly who won Gospić Croatia Osiguranje.

== Final tournament ==
Semi-finals
1 October
(Croatia) Gospić CO
(Serbia) Vojvodina NIS
1 October
(Croatia) Šibenik Jolly
(Slovenia) AJM Maribor

Final
3 October
(Croatia) Gospić CO	69
(Croatia) Šibenik Jolly	85
Third place
3 October
(Serbia) Vojvodina NIS
(Slovenia) AJM Maribor
