= Darko Anić =

Darko Anić may refer to:

- Darko Anić (chess player) (born 1957), Croatian-born French chess player
- Darko Anić (footballer) (born 1974), Serbian football player
