= ANIC =

Anic or ANIC may refer to:

== Organisations ==
- African Network Information Center, the regional Internet registry for Africa
- The Anglican Diocese of Canada, known from 2009 to 2024 as the Anglican Network in Canada, a diocese of the Anglican Church in North America
- Australian National Imams Council, a religious organization in Australia
- Australian National Insect Collection, a division of the CSIRO
- Azienda Nazionale Idrogenazione Combustibili, a former Italian chemical company (1936–1953)

== Other uses ==
- Anić, a surname
- "A.N.I.C.", a song on the album Does This Look Infected? by Sum 41
