= Euroleague Women 2007–08 Regular Season Group B =

International basketball tournament

Standings and Results for Group B of the Regular Season phase of the 2007-08 Euroleague Women basketball tournament.

Main page: EuroLeague Women 2007-08

Key to colors
Top four places in each group, advance to Eighth-Final Play-Offs
Eliminated

== Standings ==
	Team	Pld	W	L	PF	PA	Diff
1.	(Russia) UMMC Ekaterinburg	10	9	1	790	606	+184
2.	(France) Bourges Basket	10	6	4	670	620	+50
3.	(Poland) Wisła Can-Pack Kraków	10	5	5	658	709	-51
4.	(Spain) Halcon Avenida	10	4	6	732	793	-61
5.	(Czech Republic) USK Praha	10	3	7	686	741	-55
6.	(Croatia) Šibenik Jolly JBS	10	3	7	672	739	-67

== Fixtures and results ==
=== Game 1 ===
November 7, 2007

November 7
19:00

(Report)

UMMC Ekaterinburg (Russia)	85–43	(Czech Republic) USK Praha
Scoring by quarter: 22- 9, 16-13, 23-7, 24-14

Ekaterinburg

November 7
20:00

(Report)

Bourges Basket (France)	89–72	(Croatia) Šibenik Jolly JBS
Scoring by quarter: 23-19, 23-19, 20-23, 23-11

Bourges

November 7
20:30

(Report)

Halcon Avenida (Spain)	71–76	(Poland) Wisła Kraków
Scoring by quarter: 18-21, 13-19, 15-20, 25-16

Salamanca

=== Game 2 ===
November 14–15, 2007

November 14
18:15

(Report)

Wisła Kraków (Poland)	53–80	(Russia) UMMC Ekaterinburg
Scoring by quarter: 15-20, 10-26, 18-13, 10-21

Kraków

November 14
19:00

(Report)

Šibenik Jolly JBS (Croatia)	80–71	(Spain) Halcon Avenida
Scoring by quarter: 28-26, 17-16, 13-17, 22-12

Šibenik

November 15
18:00

(Report)

USK Praha (Czech Republic)	60–51	(France) Bourges Basket
Scoring by quarter: 11-9, 16-21, 21-12, 12-9

Prague

=== Game 3 ===
November 21, 2007

November 21
18:15

Report

Wisła Kraków (Poland)	74–71	(Czech Republic) USK Praha
Scoring by quarter: 22-21, 12-15, 23-16, 17-19

Kraków

November 21
19:00

Report

UMMC Ekaterinburg (Russia)	78–63	(Croatia) Šibenik Jolly JBS
Scoring by quarter: 22-17, 23-17, 19-16, 14-13

Ekaterinburg

November 21
20:30

Report

Halcon Avenida (Spain)	69–65	(France) Bourges Basket
Scoring by quarter: 22-23, 16-12, 12-19, 19-11

Salamanca

=== Game 4 ===
November 28–29, 2007

November 28
19:00

(Report)

Šibenik Jolly JBS (Croatia)	65–64	(Poland) Wisła Kraków
Scoring by quarter: 15-12, 18-13, 18-19, 14-20

Šibenik

November 28
20:00

(Report)

Bourges Basket (France)	56–57	(Russia) UMMC Ekaterinburg
Scoring by quarter: 15-13, 13-12, 19-18, 9-14

Bourges

November 29
18:30

(Report)

USK Praha (Czech Republic)	82–88	(Spain) Halcon Avenida
Scoring by quarter: 20-18, 22-19, 11-23, 29-28

Prague

=== Game 5 ===
December 5–6, 2007

December 5
18:15

(Report)

Wisła Kraków (Poland)	66–61	(France) Bourges Basket
Scoring by quarter: 23-13, 14-12, 11-22, 18-14

Kraków

December 5
19:00

(Report)

UMMC Ekaterinburg (Russia)	90–64	(Spain) Halcon Avenida
Scoring by quarter: 23-18, 19-19, 27-12, 21-15

Ekaterinburg

December 6
19:00

(Report)

Šibenik Jolly JBS (Croatia)	62–71	(Czech Republic) USK Praha
Scoring by quarter: 13-16, 17-14, 17-22, 15-19

Šibenik

=== Game 6 ===
December 12, 2007

December 12
18:15

(Report)

Wisła Kraków (Poland)	80–72	(Spain) Halcon Avenida
Scoring by quarter: 21-24, 24-12, 16-14, 19-22

Kraków

December 12
18:30

(Report)

USK Praha (Czech Republic)	72–81	(Russia) UMMC Ekaterinburg
Scoring by quarter: 21-17, 21-24, 15-24, 15-16

Prague

December 12
19:00

(Report)

Šibenik Jolly JBS (Croatia)	64–74	(France) Bourges Basket
Scoring by quarter: 20-25, 16-11, 11-25, 17-13

Šibenik

=== Game 7 ===
December 19–20, 2007

December 19
20:00

(Report)

Bourges Basket (France)	71–60	(Czech Republic) USK Praha
Scoring by quarter: 18-14, 17-19, 18-13, 18-14

Bourges

December 19
20:30

(Report)

Halcon Avenida (Spain)	82–72	(Croatia) Šibenik Jolly JBS
Scoring by quarter: 17-25, 25-15, 20-16, 20-16

Salamanca

December 20
19:00

(Report)

UMMC Ekaterinburg (Russia)	75–49	(Poland) Wisła Kraków
Scoring by quarter: 23-13, 12-13, 21-9, 19-14

Ekaterinburg

=== Game 8 ===
January 9–10, 2008

January 9
19:00

(Report)

Šibenik Jolly JBS (Croatia)	66–86	(Russia) UMMC Ekaterinburg
Scoring by quarter: 14-23, 17-17, 13-23, 22-23

Šibenik

January 9
20:00

(Report)

Bourges Basket (France)	79–59	(Spain) Halcon Avenida
Scoring by quarter: 22-22, 17-14, 20-13, 20-10

Bourges

January 10
18:30

(Report)

USK Praha (Czech Republic)	85–90	(Poland) Wisła Kraków
Scoring by quarter: 24-22, 20-22, 17-24, 24-22

Prague

=== Game 9 ===
January 16, 2008

January 16
18:15

(Report)

Wisła Kraków (Poland)	55–69	(Croatia) Šibenik Jolly JBS
Scoring by quarter: 13-19, 20-11, 11-15, 11-24

Kraków

January 16
19:00

(Report)

UMMC Ekaterinburg (Russia)	62–64	(France) Bourges Basket
Scoring by quarter: 19-16, 17-6, 13-22, 13-20

Ekaterinburg

January 16
20:30

(Report)

Halcon Avenida (Spain)	80–73	(Czech Republic) USK Praha
Scoring by quarter: 16-18, 19-20, 25-17, 20-18

Salamanca

=== Game 10 ===
January 23, 2008

January 23
18:30

(Report)

USK Praha (Czech Republic)	69–59	(Croatia) Šibenik Jolly JBS
Scoring by quarter: 22-15, 12-14, 19-13, 16-17

Prague

January 23
20:00

(Report)

Bourges Basket (France)	60–51	(Poland) Wisła Kraków
Scoring by quarter: 18-18, 12-5, 20-15, 10-13

Bourges

January 23
20:30

(Report)

Halcon Avenida (Spain)	76–96	(Russia) UMMC Ekaterinburg
Scoring by quarter: 24-18, 22-17, 11-32, 19-29

Salamanca
