= 2007–08 WABA NBL =

- League: WABA NBL
- Sport: Basketball
- Duration: 27 October 2007 - 22 March 2008
- Number of games: 94
- Number of teams: 10

2007–08
- Season champions: (Croatia) Šibenik Jolly (3rd title)
- Season MVP: (Czech Republic) Lucie Conkova

WABA League seasons
- ← 2006–07 2008–09 →

WABA NBL for season 2007–08 was the seventh season of WABA League. The study included tens teams from five countries, a champion for the third time in team history became Šibenik Jolly. In this season participating clubs from Serbia, Montenegro, Bosnia and Herzegovina, Croatia and from Slovenia.

WABA NBL for season 2007–08 has begun to play 27 October 2007 and ended on 17 March 2008, when he it was completed a Regular season. Final Four to be played from 21 to 22 March 2008. in Šibenik, Croatia. Winner Final Four this season for the team Šibenik Jolly.

== Team information ==
Country	Teams	Team	City	Venue (Capacity)
Croatia	4			
Croatia	4	Gospić Croatia Osiguranje	Gospić	Gradska Školska Sportska Dvorana (2,000)
Croatia	4	Šibenik Jolly	Šibenik	Dvorana Baldekin (1,500)
Croatia	4	Medveščak	Zagreb	ŠD Peščenica (600)
Croatia	4	Ragusa Dubrovnik	Dubrovnik	Športska dvorana Gospino polje (1,400)
Montenegro	2			
Montenegro	2	Budućnost	Podgorica	Morača Sports Center (4,570)
Montenegro	2	Jedinstvo	Bijelo Polje	Nikoljac (2,000)
Serbia	2			
Serbia	2	Vojvodina NIS	Novi Sad	SPC Vojvodina (1,030)
Serbia	2	Crvena zvezda	Belgrade	Basket City Hall (1,600)
Bosnia and Herzegovina	1			
Bosnia and Herzegovina	1	Mladi Krajišnik	Banja Luka	Sports hall Obilićevo (800)
Slovenia	1			
Slovenia	1	Merkur Celje	Celje	Dvorana Gimnazije Celje - Center (1,500)

== Regular season ==
The League of the season was played with 10 teams and play a dual circuit system, each with each one game at home and away. The four best teams at the end of the regular season were placed in the Final Four. The regular season began on 27 October 2007 and it will end on 17 March 2008.

Place	Team	Pld	W	L	PF	PA	Diff	Pts	
1.	(Croatia) Šibenik Jolly	18	16	2	1469	1108	+361	34	Final Four
2.	(Montenegro) Budućnost	18	15	3	1425	1184	+241	33	Final Four
3.	Gospić Croatia Osiguranje	18	14	4	1377	1185	+192	32	Final Four
4.	(Croatia) Ragusa Dubrovnik	18	10	8	1290	1262	+28	28	Final Four
5.	(Serbia) Crvena zvezda	18	10	8	1315	1316	-1	28	
6.	(Montenegro) Jedinstvo	18	6	12	1241	1376	-135	24	
7.	(Slovenia) Merkur Celje	17	6	11				23	
8.	(Croatia) Medveščak	18	5	13	1251	1421	-170	23	
9.	(Serbia) Vojvodina NIS	17	4	13				21	
10.	(Bosnia and Herzegovina) Mladi Krajišnik	18	3	15				21	

== Final four ==
Final Four to be played from 21 to 22 March 2008. in the Gradska Skolska Sportska Dvorana in Gospić, Croatia.

club 1	result	club 2
semifinals
(Croatia) Šibenik Jolly	81:57	(Croatia) Ragusa Dubrovnik
Gospić Croatia Osiguranje	75:60	(Montenegro) Budućnost
for third place
(Montenegro) Budućnost	67:78	(Croatia) Ragusa Dubrovnik
final
(Croatia) Šibenik Jolly	72:66	Gospić Croatia Osiguranje

2007–08 WABA NBL

Šibenik Jolly JBS
3rd Title
