= 2012–13 WBFAL =

- Sport: Basketball
- No. of teams: 6
- Country: Bosnia and Herzegovina; Croatia; Montenegro
- Continent: FIBA Europe (Europe)
- Most recent champions: Budućnost Podgorica (1st title)

2012–13 WBFAL was the first edition of Women Basketball Friendship Adriatic League. Participated six teams from three countries, champion became the team of Budućnost Podgorica.

== Team information ==
Country	Teams	Team	City	Venue (Capacity)
Montenegro	3			
Montenegro	3	Budućnost	Podgorica	Morača Sports Center (4,570)
Montenegro	3	Rolling	Nikšić	
Montenegro	3	Lovćen	Cetinje	
Croatia	2			
Croatia	2	Ragusa	Dubrovnik	Športska dvorana Gospino polje (1,400)
Croatia	2	Vodice	Vodice	
Bosnia and Herzegovina	1			
Bosnia and Herzegovina	1	Trebinje 03	Trebinje	

== Regular season ==
Place	Team	Pld	W	L	PF	PA	Diff	Pts	
1.	(Croatia) Ragusa	15	12	3			+246	27	Final Four
2.	(Montenegro) Primorje	15	11	4			+175	26	Final Four
3.	(Montenegro) Budućnost Podgorica	15	10	5			+210	25	Final Four
4.	(Montenegro) Rolling Nikšić	15	8	7			+117	23	Final Four
5.	(Bosnia and Herzegovina) Trebinje 03	15	3	12			-343	18	
6.	(Croatia) Vodice	15	1	14			-407	16	

== Final four ==
Final Four to be played from 4–5 March 2013 in Igalo, Montenegro.

club 1	result	club 2
semifinals
(Croatia) Ragusa	63:61	(Montenegro) Rolling Nikšić
(Montenegro) Budućnost Podgorica	64:60	(Montenegro) Primorje
final
(Croatia) Ragusa	51:60	(Montenegro) Budućnost Podgorica

== Awards ==
- Top scorer: Ivona Matić of Ragusa (Croatia)
