= Marta Čakić =

Croatian basketball player

Personal information
- Born: 16 August 1982 (age 44) Drniš, SFR Yugoslavia
- Listed height: 1.75 m (5 ft 9 in)

Career information
- WNBA draft: 2004: undrafted
- Playing career: 1995–2012
- Position: Shooting guard

Career history
- 1995–2005: Jolly Šibenik
- 2005–2006: Gospić
- 2006–2007: Budućnost Podgorica
- 2007–2008: Ragusa Dubrovnik
- 2008–2011: Jolly Šibenik
- 2012: UNB Obenasa
Medals
Women's basketball
Representing Croatia
Mediterranean Games
Silver medal – second place	2005 Almería	Team
Bronze medal – third place	2009 Pescara	Team

Marta Čakić (born 16 August 1982) is a Croatian former female professional basketball player.
