= Stipe Bralić =

Croatian basketball coach

Šibenik
- Position: Head coach
- League: Croatian League

Personal information
- Born: June 10, 1973 (age 53) Šibenik, SR Croatia, SFR Yugoslavia

Career history

Coaching
- Šibenik Jolly JBS
- Gospić Croatia Osiguranje
- 2008–2013: Croatia
- 2013–2016: Kaštela
- 2017–present: Šibenik
- 2019–present: Croatia
Medals
Head Coach for Croatia
Bronze medal – third place	2009 Italy	Team

Stipe Bralić (born June 10, 1973) is a Croatian professional basketball coach who is the head coach of ŽKK Šibenik and the senior women's Croatia national team, which he led at the 2012 Summer Olympics in London.
