= 2007 Vojko Herksel Cup =

- League: Vojko Herksel Cup
- Sport: Basketball
- Duration: 21 – 23 October 2007

2007
- Season champions: (Croatia) Šibenik Jolly (2nd title)

Vojko Herksel Cup seasons
- ← 2006 2008 →

The 2007 Vojko Herksel Cup was the 2nd Vojko Herksel Cup whose groups were held which took place at several venues across ex-Yugoslavia. In the Vojko Herksel Cup played 10 teams. Šibenik, a past winner of seasonal regional league, is secured directly to the final tournament, while the remaining 9 teams were divided into 3 groups, whose winners secured the final tournament. The final tournament was held in Bijelo Polje in Hall Nikoljac.

== Groups ==
=== Group A ===
| Place | Team | Pld | W | L | PF | PA | Diff | Pts | |
|---|---|---|---|---|---|---|---|---|---|
| 1. | ! | 0 | 0 | 0 | 0 | 0 | 0 | 0 | Final tournament |
| 2. | ! | 0 | 0 | 0 | 0 | 0 | 0 | 0 | |
| 3. | ! | 0 | 0 | 0 | 0 | 0 | 0 | 0 | |

=== Group B ===
| Place | Team | Pld | W | L | PF | PA | Diff | Pts | |
|---|---|---|---|---|---|---|---|---|---|
| 1. | ! | 0 | 0 | 0 | 0 | 0 | 0 | 0 | Final tournament |
| 2. | ! | 0 | 0 | 0 | 0 | 0 | 0 | 0 | |
| 3. | ! | 0 | 0 | 0 | 0 | 0 | 0 | 0 | |

=== Group C ===
| Place | Team | Pld | W | L | PF | PA | Diff | Pts | |
|---|---|---|---|---|---|---|---|---|---|
| 1. | ! | 0 | 0 | 0 | 0 | 0 | 0 | 0 | Final tournament |
| 2. | ! | 0 | 0 | 0 | 0 | 0 | 0 | 0 | |
| 3. | ! | 0 | 0 | 0 | 0 | 0 | 0 | 0 | |

== Final tournament ==
Semi-finals
18 October
! | !
! | !
18 October
! | !
! | !

Final
21 October
(Croatia) Šibenik Jolly | !
(Croatia) Gospić CO | !
Third place
21 October
! | !
! | !
