= Denis Periša =

Activist and hacker from Croatia (born 1983)

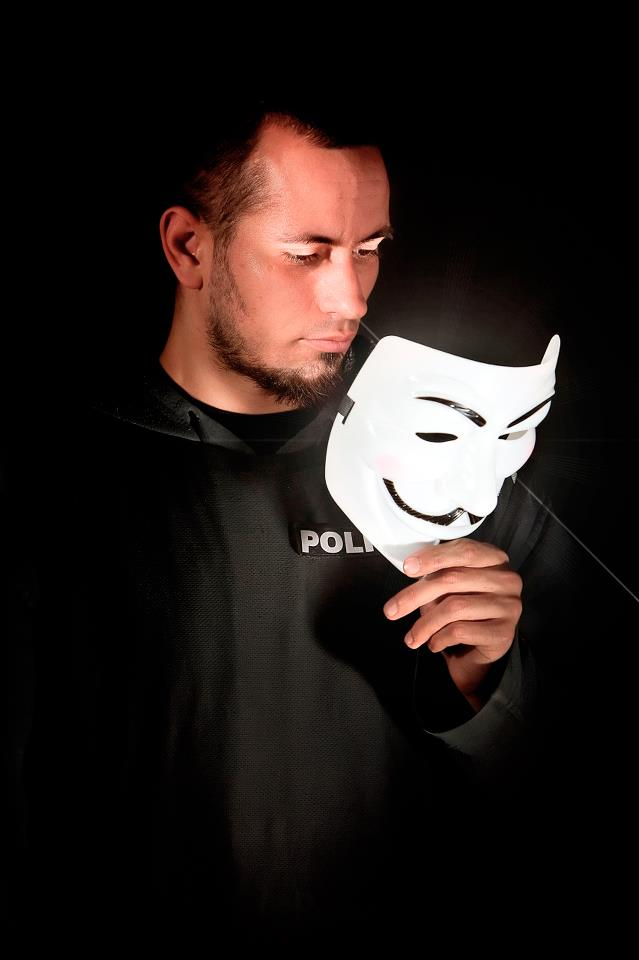
- Born: Denis Periša; July 23, 1983 (age 43); Šibenik, SR Croatia, Yugoslavia (now Croatia)
- Citizenship: Croatian
- Occupations: Computer hacker and whistle blower
- Known for: Hactivism
- Movement: Anonymous
- Relatives: Tina Periša (sister)
- Website: www.denis.in

Denis Periša (born July 23, 1983) is a political activist, whistle blower and computer hacker from Šibenik, Croatia. He founded the computer security website Jezgra.org in 1997. He was convicted and criminally charged in September 1999. He was forbidden the use of any form of computer system or the internet for hacking the e-mail of politician Veselin Pejnović while planting a backdoor to his network. In 2005, he founded ŠI-WIFI Wireless, an organization that was formed for his town.

== Infrastructure in Šibenik ==
=== Wireless network ===
Periša was the founder and president of the ŠI-WIFI organization from 21 July 2005. In August 2010, Periša claimed that he blew the whistle on the Social Democratic Party (SDP) for overspending the local municipal budget on a wireless network. He informed the city mayor Mayor Ante Županović privately, who replied with little interest. Periša then publicly confronted Županović to accuse him of stealing public money.

A local newspaper tested out the existing municipal wireless network in 2013 and concluded that Periša was right, and it was not working. After the Croatian Democratic Union (HDZ) took power, Periša was appointed to rebuild and maintain the city's wireless network, which he did using city funds in April 2014. The network was placed on 10 public nodes with 30 public antennas and access points.

On 20 November 2017, the ŠI-WIFI organization was closed and a new city network was established.

=== LoRaWAN ===
In January 2019, Periša built and installed a new type of sensor network for Šibenik, using LoRaWAN technology, and based on an 868Mhz version. Šibenik was the first town in the region to use such a network.

== Activism ==
=== Law and order ===
Beginning in 2017, Periša worked on cases for local police and DORH (the state attorney) by coming across and prosecuting online bullies and people spreading hate with the possible use of physical violence towards others. He spoke about how to report such crimes on national television. Shortly after that, he was threatened and put under police protection. Later on, he searched for fugitive Ivica Todorić and the servers Todorić used.

=== Anonymous group ===
After a decade of claiming to lead hacking groups, Periša claims he finally joined the Anonymous group firstly fighting against ACTA and similar acts. He encourages people to use the Linux OS for supposedly lower power consumption and better power savings. On June 4, 2015, Periša appeared on a Skype interview for the Alter EGO show talking about the internet and anonymously representing himself as one of the internet freedom fighters.

=== COVID-19 pandemic ===
During the COVID-19 pandemic, as part of a group, Periša made 3D-printed face shields for the local hospitals in Drniš and Knin.

== Public appearances ==
In 2014, Periša began appearing at conferences, giving a guest lecture at the Split Film Festival (STFF) on the subject of "Hacking and (Privacy) Protection". He was interviewed about the same subject by H-Alter magazine with the subject "Table to table via smartphones", commenting on his previous work and the WikiLeaks arrests which had taken place shortly before that.

In the summer of 2014, Periša was invited to do a video presentation on the island of Prvić on the subject of hacking and creative thinking.

Periša conducted a live hack on the RTL television channel and did a demonstration of an MITM attack on 14 May 2019.

On 7 October 2019, Periša implanted an xNT NFC chip in his hand and discussed it on national television and other media.

In November 2019, Periša gave a live presentation and lecture on "Potrošači Digitalnog Doba" in Split, Croatia, on the subject of personal protection and Internet news, hacks and biohacking.
