= Iva Serdar =

Croatian basketball player

Personal information
- Born: 26 August 1982 (age 44) Rijeka, SFR Yugoslavia
- Listed height: 1.95 m (6 ft 5 in)
- Position: Center

Career history
- ?: Studenac Omiš
- ?: Rogaška Slatina
- ?: Szolnok
- ?: Hatis Yerevan
- ?: Novi Zagreb
- 2011-present: Kvarner

Iva Serdar (born 26 August 1982) is a Croatian female professional basketball player. She is 6 ft 5 in (196 cm) tall.
