= 2001–02 EWWL League =

- League: Adriatic League
- Sport: Basketball
- Games: 33
- Teams: 6

2001–02
- Season champions: (Slovenia) Merkur Celje (1st title)

Adriatic League seasons
- 2002–03 →

The 2001–02 season of EWWL League was the first season of the Adriatic League. It was attended by six teams from four countries, and Merkur Celje, a club from Slovenia, became the inaugural champion of the league. In this season participating clubs from Bosnia and Herzegovina, Croatia, Slovenia and from Austria. Winner Play Off this season for the team Merkur Celje from Slovenia.

== Team information ==
Country	Teams	Team	City	Venue (Capacity)
Croatia	2			
Croatia	2	Šibenik Jolly	Šibenik	Dvorana Baldekin (1.500)
Croatia	2	Croatia Fila	Zagreb	ŠD Peščenica (600)
Slovenia	2			
Slovenia	2	Merkur Celje	Celje	Dvorana Gimnazije Celje - Center (1,500)
Slovenia	2	KIK Group Ilirija	Ljubljana	ŠRC Ježica (300)
Bosnia and Herzegovina	1			
Bosnia and Herzegovina	1	Željezničar Sarajevo	Sarajevo	Dvorana Mirza Delibašić (6.500)
Austria	1			
Austria	1	n/a	n/a	n/a

== Regular season ==
The League of the season was played with 6 teams and play a dual circuit system, each with each one game at home and away. The three best teams at the end of the regular season were placed in the Play Off.

Place	Team	Pld	W	L	PF	PA	Diff	Pts	
1.	.	10	.	.	.	.	.	.	Play Off
2.	.	10	.	.	.	.	.	.	Play Off
3.	(Slovenia) Merkur Celje	10	6	4	.	.	.	16	Play Off
4.	.	10	.	.	.	.	.	.	
5.	.	10	.	.	.	.	.	.	
6.	.	10	.	.	.	.	.	.	

== Play Off ==
Play Off to be played 22 and 23 January 2002 in the Dvorana Baldekin in Šibenik, Croatia. The Play Off teams are playing against each other, and the champion was the team with the most victories achieved.

club 1	result	club 2
(Croatia) Šibenik Jolly JBS	90:70	(Bosnia and Herzegovina) Željezničar Sarajevo
(Slovenia) Merkur Celje	71:67	(Bosnia and Herzegovina) Željezničar Sarajevo
(Croatia) Šibenik Jolly JBS	67:71	(Slovenia) Merkur Celje

2001–02 Adriatic League champion

Merkur Celje
1st Title

== Awards ==
- Play Off MVP: Katja Temnik of Merkur Celje (Slovenia)
