= Ivana Puzar =

Croatian basketball player

Personal information
- Born: 28 July 1981 (age 45) Šibenik, SFR Yugoslavia
- Listed height: 1.75 m (5 ft 9 in)
- Position: Small forward / power forward

Career history
- 2004-2008: Jolly JBS

Ivana Puzar (born 28 July 1981) is a Croatian female professional basketball player.
