= WBFAL =

- Sport: Basketball
- Founded: 2012
- First season: 2012–13
- Folded: 2015
- No. of teams: 5
- Country: Bosnia and Herzegovina; Croatia; Montenegro
- Continent: FIBA Europe (Europe)
- Last champions: (Croatia) Ragusa Dubrovnik (1st title)
- Most titles: (Montenegro) Budućnost Podgorica (2 titles)
- Website: wbfal.com

The Women Basketball Friendship Adriatic League, shortly WBFAL, was a regional basketball league featuring women's teams from Montenegro, Bosnia and Herzegovina and Croatia.

== Finals ==
Year	Final			Third and fourth place	
Year	Winner	Score	Runner-up	Third place	Fourth place
2012–13; Details	(Montenegro); Budućnost Podgorica	73:63	(Croatia); Ragusa Dubrovnik	(Montenegro); Primorje	(Montenegro); Rolling Nikšić
2013–14; Details	(Montenegro); Budućnost Podgorica	60:51	(Croatia); Ragusa Dubrovnik	(Montenegro); Lovćen	(Montenegro); Primorje
2014–15; Details	(Croatia); Ragusa Dubrovnik	2:0	(Montenegro); Lovćen	(Montenegro); Nikšić 1995	(Bosnia and Herzegovina); Trebinje 03

== Champions ==
Team	Winners	Runners-up	Years won	Years runner-up
(Montenegro) Budućnost Podgorica	2	–	2013, 2014	–
(Croatia) Ragusa Dubrovnik	1	2	2015	2013, 2014
(Montenegro) Lovćen	–	1	–	2015
