= KK FSV =

Croatian basketball club

- Leagues: Premier Women's League
- Founded: 2008
- Arena: Dvorana Mladosti
- Capacity: 2,960
- Location: Rijeka, Croatia
- President: Katja Jajaš
- Website: www.kk-fsv.hr

KK Flumen Sancti Viti, commonly referred to as KK FSV or FSV for short, is a Croatian basketball club based in the city of Rijeka. Founded in 2008, the club has around 150 players across various youth categories and operates both a men's and women's section.

The club's name is in Latin, translated as "River of St. Vitus," in reference to the phrase used in medieval sources to refer to the city, as well as the city's patron saint, Saint Vitus. The club host their games at Dvorana Mladosti ("Youth Hall"), a multi-sports indoor arena in the historic neighborhood of Trsat.

As of 2024, the women's senior team plays in the Women's Premier League, the top level of women's basketball in Croatia, while the club's men's senior team plays in the Croatian third level.
