= Petra Štampalija =

Croatian basketball player

Personal information
- Born: August 23, 1980 (age 46) Šibenik, SFR Yugoslavia
- Listed height: 1.89 m (6 ft 2 in)

Career information
- Playing career: 2000–2013
- Position: Power forward / center

Career history
- 2000-2002: Jolly JBS
- 2002-2003: Toulouse Métropole Basket
- 2003-2005: Stade Clermontois
- 2006-2007: Basket Spezia Club
- 2007-2008: CCC Polkowice
- 2008-2009: CB Avenida
- 2009-2010: Uni Girona CB
- 2010-2011: Jolly JBS
- 2011-2012: Saint-Amand Hainaut Basket
- 2012: TS Wisła Can-Pack Kraków
- 2013: Saint-Amand Hainaut Basket

Petra Štampalija (born August 23, 1980) is a former Croatian female basketball player.
