= Tina Periša =

Croatian basketball player

Trina Periša
Personal information
- Born: 15 November 1984 (age 42) Šibenik, SFR Yugoslavia
- Listed height: 1.70 m (5 ft 7 in)

Career information
- WNBA draft: 2006: undrafted
- Playing career: 2000–2013
- Position: Center

Career history
- 2000–2004: Jolly JBS
- 2006–2007: Ragusa Dubrovnik
- 2007–2008: Jolly JBS
- 2008–2009: Ragusa Dubrovnik
- 2009–2010: Jedinstvo Tuzla
- 2010–2011: Željezničar Sarajevo
- 2012–2013: Rudar Sport
Medals
Women's basketball
Representing Croatia
Mediterranean Games
Bronze medal – third place	2009 Pescara	Team

Trina Periša, married Tanasilović (born 15 November 1984 in Šibenik, SFR Yugoslavia) is a Croatian female professional basketball player.
