= 2013–14 WBFAL =

- Sport: Basketball
- No. of teams: 6
- Country: Bosnia and Herzegovina; Croatia; Montenegro
- Continent: FIBA Europe (Europe)
- Most recent champions: Budućnost Podgorica (2nd title)

2013–14 WBFAL was the second edition of Women Basketball Friendship Adriatic League. Participated six teams from three countries, champion became the team of Budućnost Podgorica.

== Team information ==
Country	Teams	Team	City	Venue (Capacity)
Montenegro	3			
Montenegro	3	Budućnost	Podgorica	Morača Sports Center (4,570)
Montenegro	3	Primorje	Herceg Novi	
Montenegro	3	Lovćen	Cetinje	
Croatia	2			
Croatia	2	Ragusa	Dubrovnik	Športska dvorana Gospino polje (1,400)
Croatia	2	Vodice	Vodice	
Bosnia and Herzegovina	1			
Bosnia and Herzegovina	1	Trebinje 03	Trebinje	

== Regular season ==
Place	Team	Pld	W	L	PF	PA	Diff	Pts	
1.	(Montenegro) Budućnost Podgorica	15	15	0			+359	30	Final Four
2.	(Montenegro) Primorje	15	11	4			+244	26	Final Four
3.	(Croatia) Ragusa	15	9	6			+149	24	Final Four
4.	(Montenegro) Lovćen	15	7	8			0	22	Final Four
5.	(Croatia) Vodice	15	3	12			-252	18	
6.	(Bosnia and Herzegovina) Trebinje 03	15	1	14			-500	15	

== Final four ==
Final Four to be played from 4–5 April 2014 in Dubrovnik, Croatia.

club 1	result	club 2
semifinals
(Montenegro) Budućnost	89:65	(Montenegro) Lovćen
(Croatia) Ragusa	66:55	(Montenegro) Primorje
final
(Croatia) Ragusa	63:73	(Montenegro) Budućnost
