= Vojko Herksel Cup =

Annual basketball competition

- Sport: Basketball
- Founded: 2006
- Folded: 2010
- Continent: FIBA Europe (Europe)
- Last champions: (Croatia) Šibenik (4th title)
- Most titles: (Croatia) Šibenik (4 titles)

The Vojko Herksel Cup was an annual basketball club competition held between 2006 and 2010. The last Vojko Herksel Cup season was held during 2010. The cup is 2007 renamed in honor of the former director Adriatic League Vojko Herksel, who died in 2007, which contributed to the development of women's basketball.

== Finals ==
Year	Host	Final		
Year	Host	Winner	Score	Runner-up
2006; Details	N / A	(Croatia); Šibenik Jolly	72–69	Gospić Croatia Osiguranje
2007; Details	Montenegro (Bijelo Polje)	(Croatia); Šibenik Jolly	N / A	Gospić Croatia Osiguranje
2008; Details	Croatia (Šibenik)	Gospić Croatia Osiguranje	77–74	(Croatia); Šibenik Jolly
2009; Details	Croatia (Gospić)	(Croatia); Šibenik Jolly	85–75	Gospić Croatia Osiguranje
2010; Details	Croatia (Gospić)	(Croatia); Šibenik Jolly	85–69	(Croatia); Gospić

== Champions ==
Club	Winners	Runners-up	Winning years	Runner-up years
(Croatia) Šibenik	4	1	2006, 2007, 2009, 2010	2008
(Croatia) Gospić	1	4	2008	2006, 2007, 2009, 2010

== See also ==
- WABA League
