= 2014–15 WBFAL =

- Sport: Basketball
- No. of teams: 5
- Country: Bosnia and Herzegovina; Croatia; Montenegro
- Continent: FIBA Europe (Europe)
- Most recent champion: (Croatia) Ragusa Dubrovnik (1st title)

2014–15 WBFAL was the third edition of Women Basketball Friendship Adriatic League. Participated five teams from three countries, champion became the team of Ragusa Dubrovnik.

== Team information ==
Country	Teams	Team	City	Venue (Capacity)
Montenegro	2			
Montenegro	2	Nikšić 1995	Nikšić	
Montenegro	2	Lovćen	Cetinje	
Croatia	2			
Croatia	2	Ragusa Dubrovnik	Dubrovnik	Športska dvorana Gospino polje (1,400)
Croatia	2	Vodice	Vodice	
Bosnia and Herzegovina	1			
Bosnia and Herzegovina	1	Trebinje 03	Trebinje	

== Regular season ==
Place	Team	Pld	W	L	PF	PA	Diff	Pts	
1.	(Croatia) Ragusa Dubrovnik	7	6	1	584	490	+94	13	Final Four
2.	(Montenegro) Lovćen	7	6	1	644	555	+89	13	Final Four
3.	(Montenegro) Nikšić 1995	6	2	4	347	363	-16	8	Final Four
4.	(Bosnia and Herzegovina) Trebinje 03	6	2	4	238	277	-39	8	Final Four
5.	(Croatia) Vodice	6	1	5	257	385	-128	7	

== Final ==
club 1	result	club 2
final
(Croatia) Ragusa Dubrovnik	70:67	(Montenegro) Lovćen
(Montenegro) Lovćen	68:72	(Croatia) Ragusa Dubrovnik

2014–15 WBFAL

Ragusa Dubrovnik
1st Title
