= Matea Vrdoljak =

Croatian basketball player

Personal information
- Born: November 19, 1985 (age 40) Split, SFR Yugoslavia
- Listed height: 1.83 m (6 ft 0 in)
- Position: Shooting guard

Career history
- 2005-2007: Ragusa Dubrovnik
- 2010-2011: Alges Dafundo
- 2011-2012: Quinta dos Lombos
- 2012: CSM Sportul
- 2012-2013: Novi Zagreb
- 2013: Spartak Noginsk
- 2013-2014: Katarzynki Toruń
- 2014-2015: ASPTT Arras

Matea Vrdoljak (born November 19, 1985) is a Croatian female basketball player.
