= Antonela Anić =

Croatian basketball player

Personal information
- Born: 1 June 1985 (age 41) Bugojno, SFR Yugoslavia
- Listed height: 1.77 m (5 ft 10 in)

Career information
- WNBA draft: 2007: undrafted
- Playing career: –2016
- Position: Small forward / power forward

Career history
- 2012–2016: Studenac Omiš

Antonela Anić (born 1 June 1985 in Bugojno, SFR Yugoslavia) is a Croatian female professional basketball player.
