= Vanda Baranović =

Yugoslavian and Croatian basketball player

Personal information
- Born: October 3, 1971 (age 55) Šibenik, SFR Yugoslavia

Career information
- Playing career: –2008

Career history
- Šibenik Jolly
- 2003–2006: Gospić
- 2006–2007: Ceyhan
- 2007–2008: CB Ciudad de Burgos
- 2008: Novi Zagreb
Medals
Women's basketball
Representing Croatia
Mediterranean Games
Gold medal – first place	1997 Bari	Team
Gold medal – first place	2001 Tunis	Team

Vanda Baranović-Urukalo (born 3 October 1971 in Šibenik, SFR Yugoslavia) is a former Yugoslavian and Croatian female basketball player.
