= Ante Anić =

Croatian footballer

Personal information
- Date of birth: 8 June 1989 (age 37)
- Place of birth: Zagreb, SR Croatia, SFR Yugoslavia
- Height: 1.83 m (6 ft 0 in)
- Position: Midfielder

Team information
- Current team: ASK Hausmening

Youth career
- –2007: Hrvatski Dragovoljac

Senior career*
| Years | Team | Apps | (Gls) |
| 2007–2008 | Rudeš | | |
| 2008–2009 | Imotski | | |
| 2009–2010 | HAŠK | | |
| 2010–2011 | Gorica | | |
| 2011–2012 | Vrbovec | | |
| 2012 | Karlovac | 11 | (0) |
| 2012–2013 | Vrbovec | | |
| 2013 | Nußdorfer AC | 13 | (2) |
| 2013–2015 | SV Gaflenz | 52 | (11) |
| 2015–2018 | Blau-Weiß Linz | 48 | (3) |
| 2019 | SC Liezen | 12 | (1) |
| 2019–2020 | Gmunden | 22 | (4) |
| 2021- | ASK Hausmening | 21 | (10) |
- * Club domestic league appearances and goals as of 12 February 2019

Ante Anić (born 8 June 1989) is a Croatian footballer who plays for Austrian amateur side ASK Hausmening.

== Club career ==
After playing in the three top tiers of Croatian football, he moved to Austria and has played on different levels there as well but most notably with Blau-Weiß Linz in the second tier and with SV Gmunden.
