= Irena Matović =

Montenegrin basketball player

Enea AZS Poznań
- Position: Shooting guard
- League: Basket Liga Kobiet

Personal information
- Born: 23 May 1988 (age 38) Bar, SFR Yugoslavia
- Listed height: 184 cm (6 ft 0 in)

Career information
- WNBA draft: 2010: undrafted

Career history
- Kecskemeti KC
- MKB Euroleasing Sopron
- Sepsi Sfantu Gheorghe
- Hapoel Tel Aviv
- US Laveyron Drome
- –2014: Vojvodina
- 2014: Partizan
- 2014–2017: Budućnost Podgorica
- 2017–2018: Beočin
- 2018–: Enea AZS Poznań

Irena Matović (born 23 May 1988) is a Montenegrin basketball player for Enea AZS Poznań and the Montenegrin national team.

She participated at the EuroBasket Women 2017.
