= Ilisha Jarrett =

American basketball player

Trinos Göttingen
- League: FIBA Women's Pro League

Personal information
- Born: January 8, 1977 (age 49) Illinois, U.S.
- Listed height: 6 ft 5 in (1.96 m)
- Listed weight: 191 lb (87 kg)

Career information
- Playing career: 1996–present

Career history
- 1996–1998: Mississippi State University
- 1998–2000: University of Alabama in Huntsville
- BK SGAU Samara: Ronchetti Cup 2002
- 2003: Korean Summer Basketball League
- 2004–2005: Gospic Industrogradnja
- 2005–2006: Siemens Poprad
- 2006–2008: APS Siemens

Career highlights
- Croatian Basketball Cup Winner 2005; Trocal League Finalist 2005

Ilisha Keisha Marie Jarrett (born January 8, 1977) is an American retired professional basketball player.

== Sports career ==
Ilisha began her sports career in 1996 by playing for Mississippi State University and after five years, played in the FIBA professional women's basketball league. The 38-year-old American has played for Russian, Korean, Portuguese, Hungarian, Croatia and German clubs. She is co-owner of the Dominican Republic basketball team Samana Gladiatores.

== Mississippi State and Alabama-Huntsville statistics ==
Legend
GP	Games played	GS	Games started	MPG	Minutes per game
FG%	Field goal percentage	3P%	3-point field goal percentage	FT%	Free throw percentage
RPG	Rebounds per game	APG	Assists per game	SPG	Steals per game
BPG	Blocks per game	PPG	Points per game	**Bold**	Career high

Year	Team	GP	Points	FG%	3P%	FT%	RPG	APG	SPG	BPG	PPG
1998–99	Mississippi State	18	26	45.8%	0.0%	0.4%	1.3	0.1	–	0.3	1.4
1999-00	Mississippi State	4	7	**66.7%**	0.0%	**60.0%**	2.5	–	0.3	–	1.8
2000–01	Alabama-Huntsville	**24**	**119**	45.6%	**45.6%**	55.6%	**5.2**	**0.3**	**0.5**	**0.7**	**5.0**
Career		46	152	46.1%	45.6%	0.0%	0.0	0.2	0.3	0.5	3.3

== Sexual assault incident ==
Jarrett moved to Gospić in Lika, Croatia in September 2004 as a reinforcement to Croatia's best women's basketball team Gospić-Industrogradnja, which had placed in the top sixteen teams in the FIBA Cup the previous season.

In 2005, a Croatian businessman, Joso Mraović approached Jarrett in a hotel and sexually assaulted her. Initially, judge Branko Milanović ruled that it was not rape because Mraović "only put his finger inside her anus", so it was ruled that the "anus was not a sex organ, nor was the finger, otherwise any unsolicited handshake could be characterized as rape". However, later in 2008, Mraović, then 58, was sentenced to three years in prison for battery, a physical delict per Croatian law. A year later, judge Milanović was relieved of his duties. The term "Lika-style handshake" (Croatian: ličko rukovanje, as a euphemism for anal fingering) became widespread in Croatia following the incident. Mraović died in November 2020 due to COVID-19.
