= Kristina Raković =

Montenegrin basketball player

No. 20 – Valencia Basket
- Position: Power forward / center
- League: LFB 2

Personal information
- Born: 26 September 1994 (age 32) Bijelo Polje, Montenegro, FR Yugoslavia
- Listed height: 6 ft 1 in (1.85 m)

Career information
- WNBA draft: 2016: undrafted
- Playing career: 2010–present

Career history
- 2010–2012: Jedinstvo Bijelo Polje
- 2012–2013: Mladi Krajišnik
- 2013–2015: Šumadija Kragujevac
- 2015–2016: Budućnost Bemax
- 2016–present: Valencia Basket

Kristina Raković (Serbian: Кристина Раковић; born 26 September 1994) is a Montenegrin basketball player.
