= Luca Ivanković =

Croatian basketball player

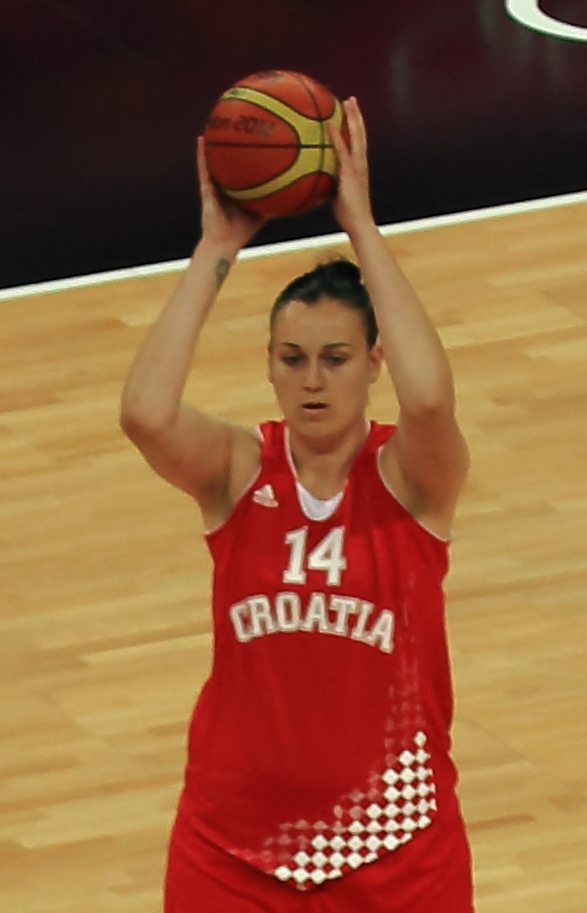
- Luca Ivanković at the 2012 Summer Olympics

No. 41 – Botaş
- Position: Center
- League: First League of Turkey

Personal information
- Born: 26 September 1987 (age 39) Split, SFR Yugoslavia
- Listed height: 1.98 m (6 ft 6 in)
- Listed weight: 100 kg (220 lb)

Career information
- WNBA draft: 2009: undrafted
- Playing career: 2005–present

Career history
- 2005–2006: Montmontaža Zagreb
- 2006–2013: Šibenik Jolly
- 2013–2014: Novi Zagreb
- 2014–2015: EB Edirnespor
- 2015–2016: Beşiktaş JK
- 2016: Samsun
- 2016–2017: Botaş
- 2017-2018: Ormanspur
- 2018-2020: Kayseri
- 2020-2021: Beşiktaş JK
- 2021-2022: Antalya 07
Medals
Women's basketball
Representing Croatia
Mediterranean Games
Bronze medal – third place	Pescara 2009	Team Event

Luca Ivanković (born 26 September 1987 in Split, SFR Yugoslavia) is a Croatian female basketball player who plays as center. At the 2012 Summer Olympics, she competed for the Croatia women's national basketball team in the women's event. She is 198 cm tall.
