= Marija Režan =

Croatian basketball player

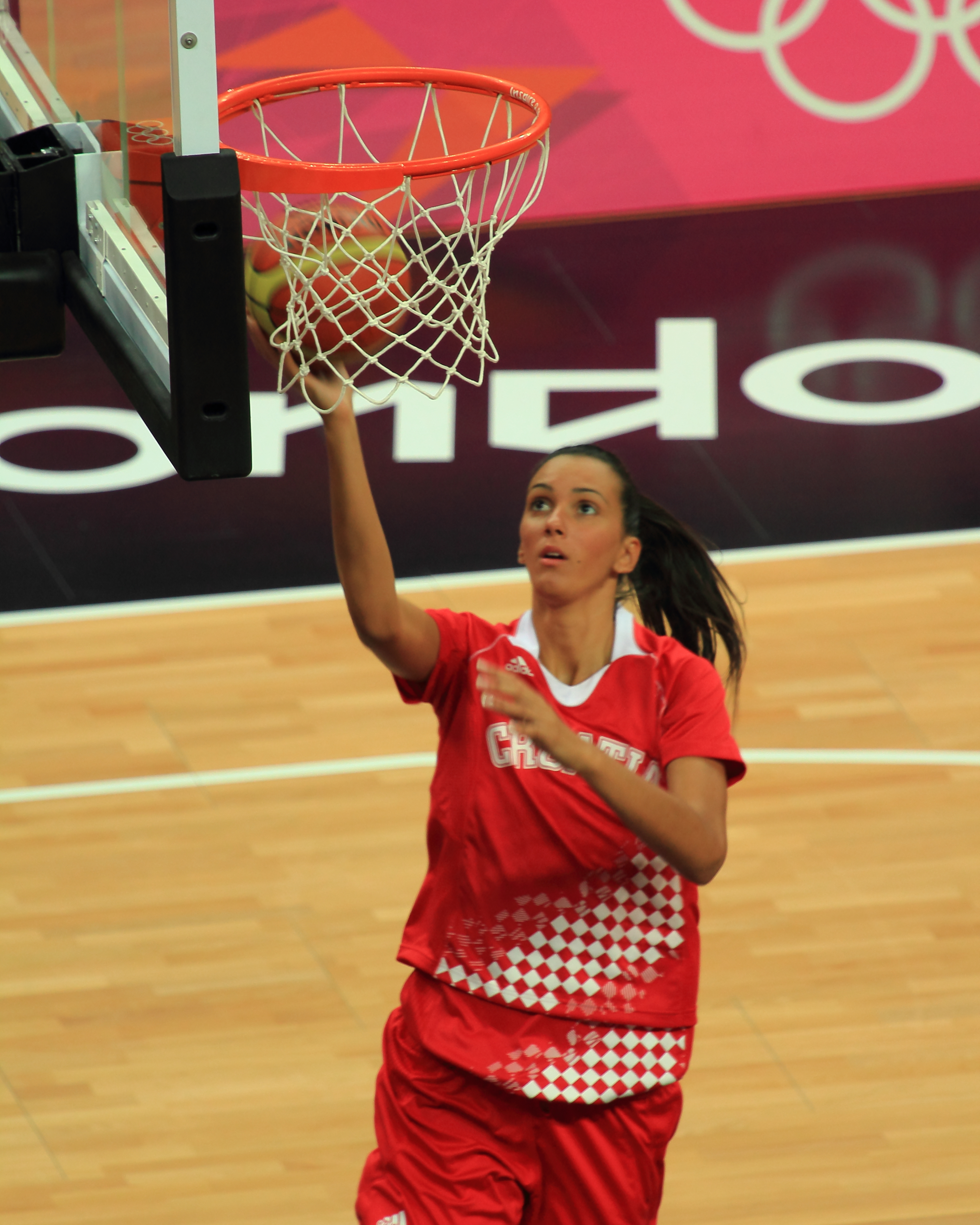
- Režan at 2012 Summer Olympics

No. 9 – CCC Polkowice
- Position: Center
- League: First League of Poland

Personal information
- Born: 8 August 1989 (age 37) Zadar, SFR Yugoslavia
- Listed height: 198 cm (6 ft 6 in)
- Listed weight: 80 kg (176 lb)

Career information
- WNBA draft: 2010: undrafted
- Playing career: 2006–present

Career history
- 2006–2008: Zadar
- 2008–2012: Gospić
- 2012–2015: Avenida
- 2015–2016: İstanbul Üniversitesi
- 2016–present: CCC Polkowice

Marija Režan (born Vrsaljko; 8 August 1989 in Zadar, SFR Yugoslavia) is a Croatian basketball player. At the 2012 Summer Olympics, she competed for the national team of Croatia in the women's event. She is 6 ft 6 inches tall. She plays for İstanbul Üniversitesi.

== Club career ==
- (Croatia) Zadar (2006–2008), Gospić (2008–12)
- (Spain) Avenida (2012–2015)
- (Turkey) İstanbul Üniversitesi (2015– )
