= ŽKK Studenac Omiš =

Croatian Women's basketball club

ŽKK Studenac Omiš is a Croatian Women's basketball club in Omiš. The headquarters is in Omiš.

== Notable players ==
- Antonela Anić
