= Ružica Meglaj-Rimac Cup =

Croatian national women's basketball cup

- Sport: Basketball
- Founded: 1991
- Country: Croatia (1991–present)
- Continent: (European Union) FIBA Europe (Europe)
- Most recent champions: Medveščak (5th title)
- Most titles: Trešnjevka 2009, Gospić (7 titles)
- Website: hks-cbf.hr (in Croatian)

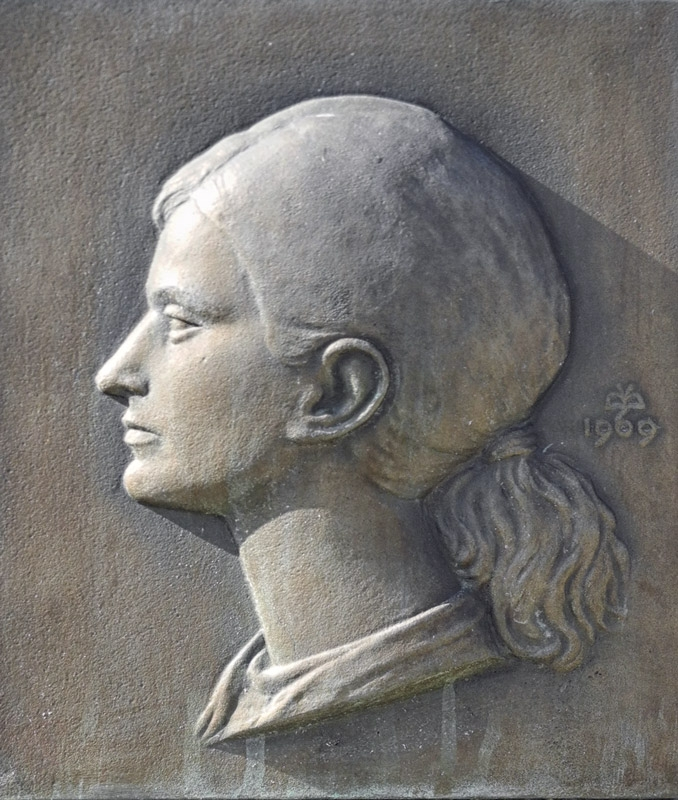
It is named after Ružica Meglaj-Rimac

The Ružica Meglaj-Rimac Cup is the national women's basketball cup of Croatia. It has been played for since 1992. It is named after Ružica Meglaj-Rimac, a noted Croatian female basketball player.

== Cup winners ==
Season	Winner	Result	Runner-up
1991–92	Split		Montmontaža Zagreb
1992–93	Montmontaža Zagreb		Split
1993–94	Montmontaža Zagreb		Split
1994–95	Centar banka Zagreb		Montmontaža Zagreb
1995–96	Montmontaža Zagreb		Centar banka Zagreb
1996–97	Centar banka Zagreb		Šibenik
1997–98	Adriatic osiguranje Zagreb		Šibenik
1998–99	Zagreb		Montmontaža Zagreb
1999–00	Croatia Zagreb		Gospić 83 Inero
2000–01	Croatia Zagreb		Šibenik Jolly JBS
2001–02	Šibenik		Gospić
2002–03	Gospić		Šibenik Jolly JBS
2003–04	Šibenik Jolly JBS		Croatia Zagreb
2004–05	Gospić		Croatia Zagreb
2005–06	Šibenik Jolly JBS	83:67	Gospić Industrogradnja
2006–07	Gospić CO	70:65	Šibenik Jolly JBS
2007–08	Šibenik Jolly JBS	78:66	Gospić Industrogradnja
2008–09	Gospić CO	79:60	Medveščak
2009–10	Gospić CO	64:56	Šibenik Jolly JBS
2010–11	Gospić CO	83:69	Šibenik Jolly JBS
2011–12	Gospić CO	107:50	Novi Zagreb
2012–13	Novi Zagreb	87:76	Šibenik Jolly JBS
2013–14	Novi Zagreb	62:44	Trešnjevka 2009
2014–15	Medveščak	64:56	Ragusa Dubrovnik
2015–16	Medveščak	67:59	Kvarner
2016–17	Medveščak	73:71	Trešnjevka 2009
2017–18	Medveščak	77:50	Ragusa Dubrovnik
2018–19	Medveščak	60:57	Šibenik
2019–20	Canceled due to COVID-19		
2020–21	Ragusa Dubrovnik	69:61	Šibenik
2021–22	Trešnjevka 2009	65:57	Medveščak
2022–23	Ragusa Dubrovnik	66:64	Trešnjevka 2009
2023–24	Plamen Požega	80:62	Ragusa Dubrovnik

== Performance by club ==
Club	City/town	Winners	Runners-up	Years Won	Years Runner-up
ŽKK Gospić	Gospić	7	4	2003, 2005, 2007, 2009, 2010, 2011, 2012	2000, 2002, 2006, 2008
ŽKK Croatia 2006	Zagreb	6	3	1995, 1997, 1998, 1999, 2000, 2001	1996, 2004, 2005
ŽKK Medveščak	Zagreb	5	2	2015, 2016, 2017, 2018, 2019	2009, 2022
ŽKK Šibenik	Šibenik	4	10	2002, 2004, 2006, 2008	1997, 1998, 2001, 2003, 2007, 2010, 2011, 2013, 2019, 2021
ŽKK Trešnjevka 2009	Zagreb	4	6	1993, 1994, 1996, 2022	1992, 1995, 1999, 2014, 2017, 2023
ŽKK Ragusa	Dubrovnik	2	3	2021, 2023	2015, 2018, 2024
ŽKK Novi Zagreb	Zagreb	2	1	2013, 2014	2012
ŽKK Splićanka	Split	1	2	1992	1993, 1994
ŽKK Plamen Požega	Požega	1	–	2024	–
ŽKK Kvarner	Rijeka	–	1	–	2016
