= Darko Anić (chess player) =

Croatian-French chess grandmaster (born 1957)

Personal information
- Born: 30 April 1957 (age 69) Zadar, Croatia

Chess career
- Country: France
- Title: Grandmaster (1999)
- Peak rating: 2499 (January 2000)

Darko Anić (born 30 April 1957) is a French chess player originally from Croatia. He was awarded the title of Grandmaster in 1999.
