= Neda Lokas =

Croatian basketball player

Personal information
- Born: 5 August 1985 (age 41) Šibenik, SFR Yugoslavia
- Listed height: 1.82 m (6 ft 0 in)

Career information
- WNBA draft: 2007: undrafted
- Playing career: 2002–2011
- Position: Small forward

Career history
- 2002–2011: Jolly JBS
- 2011: Novi Zagreb
Medals
Women's basketball
Representing Croatia
Mediterranean Games
| Bronze medal – third place | 2009 Pescara | Team |

Neda Lokas (born 5 August 1985 in Šibenik, SFR Yugoslavia) is a former Croatian female basketball player.
