= ŽKK Zadar =

Women's Basketball Club based in Zadar, Croatia

ŽKK Zadar is Croatian women's basketball club in Zadar. The headquarters is in Zadar.
