= ŽKK Croatia 2006 Zagreb =

ŽKK Croatia Zagreb
- Leagues: Croatian League
- Founded: 1974 (refounded: 2006)
- Arena: ŠŠD Pešćenica (capacity: 600)
- Location: Zagreb, Croatia
- Championships: 5 National Championships; 6 National Cups
- Website: zkkcroatia2006.com

ŽKK Croatia was a Croatian women's basketball club from Zagreb. Today is called ŽKK Croatia 2006 although the all management and composition changed.

== Honours ==
National Championships – 5

- Croatian Women's Basketball League:
  - Winners (5): 1995, 1996, 1998, 2001, 2005
  - Runners-up (2): 1994, 1997

National Cups – 6

- Ružica Meglaj-Rimac Cup:
  - Winners (6): 1995, 1997, 1998, 1999, 2000, 2001
  - Runners-up (3): 1996, 2004, 2005

FIBA cup - Final four Napoli, Italy, 2005.
