= ŽKK Trešnjevka 2009 =

ŽKK Trešnjevka Dinamo Ltd
- Leagues: First League of Croatia
- Founded: 2009
- History: 2009-
- Arena: Dom Sportova, dvorana 2 (capacity: 5.000)
- Location: Zagreb, Croatia
- Team colors: Green, White and Red
- President: Dean Nemec
- Head coach: Dean Nemec
- Championships: National cup 2022, 2025
- Website: zkktresnjevka.com
Home	Away

Ženski košarkaški klub Trešnjevka Dinamo Ltd is Croatian women's basketball club from Zagreb currently playing in the First League of Croatia, a ove sezone nastipa i u grupnoj fazi FIBA EuroCupa. Klub je tradicijski nasljednik nekada poznatih i slavnih klubova Montinga i Montmontaže (1980. god. osvojen Kup Lillan Roncheti) koji su morali ugasiti svoje sportsko djelovanje 2009. godine zbog financijskih razloga. Na toj, 60 godina dugoj tradiciji najboljeg hrvatskog ženskog košarkaškog kluba, prije šesnaest godina osnovan je Ženski Košarkaški klub Trešnjevka 2009, danas ŽKK Trešnjevka Dinamo Ltd.

== History ==
ŽKK Trešnjevka Dinamo Ltd je tradicijski nasljednik nekada poznatih i slavnih klubova Montinga i Montmontaže (1980. god. osvojen Kup Lillan Roncheti) koji su morali ugasiti svoje sportsko djelovanje 2009. godine zbog financijskih razloga. Na toj, 60 godina dugoj tradiciji najboljeg hrvatskog ženskog košarkaškog kluba, prije šesnaest godina osnovan je Ženski Košarkaški klub Trešnjevka 2009, danas ŽKK Trešnjevka Dinamo Ltd. Klub od svog osnutka 2009. god. bilježi brlo dobre rezultate u svim uzrasnim kategorijama (seniorke dva puta osvojile Kup Ružice Meglaj Rimac, četiri puta finalistkinje Premijer lige Prvenstva Hrvatske, juniorke jedanaest puta za redom prvakinje Hrvatske, kadetkinje tri puta prvakinje, U12 prvakinje Hrvatske u sezoni 2024/25). U klubu ponikle Ivana Dojkić, sa New York Liberty osvajačica WNBA naslova u sezoni 2024/25 (igrala još za Seatlle Storm i brojne euroligaške klubove), Nika Muhl (Seatlle Storm, Bešiktaš, Sopron), Iva Slonjšak (Francuska, Euroleague)...

=== Names in history ===
- KK Trešnjevka 2009 (2009–2025)
- ŽKK Trešnjevka Dinamo Ltd (2025)

== Arena ==
Dom sportova, dvorana 2 (kapacitet 5000 gledatelja)

== Honours ==
=== Domestic ===
- First League of Croatia
- Finalisti (3): 2023, 2024, 2025
- Cup of Croatia:
- Winners (2): 2022, 2025

== Current roster ==
Nika Rodek Nina Novak Lauren Hansen Katarina Mihalj Allysa Jimenez Iva Bošnjak Tara Kokolić Lori Zlatoper Zara Valčić Viktorija Ćurić Toma Poljičak Nika Gažić Karolina Škare Kristina Maričević Borna Benković Ana Vojtulek Sara Heljić Čamdžić

== Notable former players ==
- Ivana Dojkić
- Iva Slonjšak
- Nika Mühl
- Lena Bilić
