= ŽKK Šibenik =

Croatian women's basketball club

- Leagues: Premijer liga
- Founded: 1971; 54 years ago
- Arena: Baldekin Sports Hall
- Capacity: 900 (if needed 1,726)
- Location: Šibenik, Croatia
- Team colors: Orange and Black
- President: Neven Periša
- Head coach: Stipe Bralić
- Championships: 5 National Championships; 6 National Cups; 1 National Super Cup; 5 Adriatic Leagues; 4 Vojko Herksel Cups
- Website: zkk-sibenik.com.hr
Home	Away

Ženski košarkaški klub Šibenik (English: Šibenik Women's Basketball Club), commonly referred to as ŽKK Šibenik or simply Šibenik, is a professional women's basketball club based in Šibenik, Croatia. It regularly competes in and has won the national championship, Premijer liga, five times, last time in 2008, and is considered to be among the leading women's basketball clubs in the country.

== Home arena ==
Since 1973, ŽKK Šibenik plays its home matches in the Baldekin Sports Hall, which has a capacity of 900 or 1,726 if needed.

== Honours ==
=== Domestic ===
National Championships – 5

- Yugoslav Women's Basketball League
  - Winners (1): 1990–91
  - Runners-up (3): 1987–88, 1988–89, 1989–90
- Croatian Women's Basketball League:
  - Winners (4): 1996–97, 2002–03, 2006–07, 2007–08
  - Runners-up (8): 1997–98, 2003–04, 2004–05, 2005–06, 2008–09, 2009–10, 2010–11, 2011–12

National Cups – 6

- Yugoslav Women's Basketball Cup:
  - Winners (2): 1986–87, 1989–90
- Ružica Meglaj-Rimac Cup:
  - Winners (4): 2001–02, 2003–04, 2005–06, 2007–08
  - Runners-up (8): 1996–97, 1997–98, 2000–01, 2002–03, 2006–07, 2009–10, 2010–11, 2012–13

National Super Cups – 1

- Croatian Women's Basketball Super Cup:
  - Winners (1): 2007

=== International ===
International titles – 9

- Adriatic League:
  - Winners (5): 2004–05, 2005–06, 2007–08, 2008–09, 2010–11
  - Runners-up (5): 2001–02, 2002–03, 2003–04, 2006–07, 2009–10
- Vojko Herksel Cup
  - Winners (4): 2006, 2007, 2009, 2010
  - Runners-up (1): 2008

== Notable players ==
- Vanda Baranović-Urukalo
- Marta Čakić
- Luca Ivanković
- Anđa Jelavić
- Neda Lokas
- Sandra Mandir
- Antonija Mišura
- Danira Nakić
- Tina Periša
- Emanuela Salopek
- Simona Šoda

== Notable coaches ==
- Nenad Amanović
- Dražen Brajković
- Stipe Bralić
- Danko Radić
- Neven Spahija

== See also ==
- GKK Šibenka
- KK Jolly Jadranska Banka Šibenik
- Baldekin Sports Hall
