= ŽKK Ragusa =

Croatian women's basketball club

- Leagues: Premier Women's League
- Founded: 3 February 1994
- Arena: ŠD Gospino Polje
- Capacity: 1,400
- Location: Dubrovnik, Croatia
- Team colors: Red and white
- President: Lukša Matušić
- Head coach: Cvetana Matić
- Championships: 4 National League; 2 National Cup; 1 WBFAL League
- Website: zkk-ragusa.hr

ŽKK Ragusa, also known as Ragusa Dubrovnik, is a Croatian women's basketball club based in the southern city of Dubrovnik. They are one of the most successful clubs in women's basketball in their country, with four league titles and two national cups won between 2021 and 2024, as well as the 2015 edition of the short-lived Women's Adriatic Friendship League.

== Honours ==
- Croatian Premier League
  - Winners (4): 2020–21, 2021–22, 2022–23, 2023–24
- Croatian Cup
  - Winners (2): 2021, 2023
  - Runners-up (3): 2015, 2018, 2024
- Adriatic League
  - Third place (1): 2007–08
- WBFAL League
  - Winners (1): 2014–15
  - Runners-up (2): 2014–15, 2013–14
