= ŽKK Gospić =

- Leagues: Croatian League
- Founded: 1983
- Arena: Gradska Skolska Sportska Dvorana
- Location: Gospić, Croatia
- Team colors: Blue and white
- President: (Croatia) Milan Kolić
- Head coach: (Croatia) Luka Matijević
- Championships: 8 National Championships; 7 National Cups; 2 Adriatic League; 1 Vojko Herksel Cup
Home	Away

ŽKK Gospić (or Gospić Croatia Osiguranje in sponsorship) is a Croatian women's basketball club from Gospić. It currently competes with youth sections only.

== History ==
Gospić has won eight editions of the Croatian championships since 2000, including four titles in a row from 2009. After playing several editions of the Ronchetti Cup and the Eurocup, it made its debut in the Euroleague in 2010.

== Honours ==
=== Domestic ===
National Championships – 8

- Croatian Women's Basketball League:
  - Winners (8): 2000, 2002, 2004, 2006, 2009, 2010, 2011, 2012
  - Runners-up (4): 2001, 2007, 2008, 2013

National Cups – 7

- Ružica Meglaj-Rimac Cup:
  - Winners (7): 2003, 2005, 2007, 2009, 2010, 2011, 2012
  - Runners-up (4): 2000, 2002, 2006, 2008

National Super Cups – 0

- Croatian Women's Basketball SuperCup:
  - Runners-up (1): 2007

=== International ===
International titles – 3

- Women's Adriatic League:
  - Winners (2): 2004, 2010
  - Runners-up (3): 2005, 2008, 2011
- Vojko Herksel Cup
  - Winners (1): 2008
  - Runners-up (4): 2006, 2007, 2009, 2010

== Notable former players ==
- (Croatia) Jelena Ivezić
- (Croatia) Sandra Mandir
- (United States) Julie McBride
- (Israel) Limor Mizrachi
- (Croatia) Sena Pavetić
- (Croatia) Marija Vrsaljko
- (United States) Ilisha Jarret
