= EuroBasket Women 2013 squads =

This article displays the rosters for the teams competing at the EuroBasket Women 2013. Each team had to submit 12 players.

== Group A ==
=== Montenegro ===
The roster was announced on 14 June 2013.

Montenegro women's national basketball team – EuroBasket Women 2013 roster
Players
Coaches

Pos.	No.	Name	Age – Date of birth	Height	Club	Ctr.
F	4	Milena Bajić	16 – 13 November 1996	1.84 m (6 ft 0 in)	Budućnost Podgorica	(Montenegro)
G	5	Jelena Škerović	32 – 23 December 1980	1.77 m (5 ft 10 in)	ZVVZ UŠK Prague	(Czech Republic)
G	6	Anna DeForge	37 – 14 April 1976	1.79 m (5 ft 10 in)	ZVVZ UŠK Prague	(Czech Republic)
F	7	Ana Baletić	27 – 19 July 1985	1.85 m (6 ft 1 in)	Rolling Nikšić	(Montenegro)
C	8	Nataša Popović	31 – 14 April 1982	1.90 m (6 ft 3 in)	Spartak Noginsk	(Russia)
G	9	Snežana Aleksić	24 – 14 January 1989	1.73 m (5 ft 8 in)	Dynamo Moscow	(Russia)
F/C	10	Jelena Dubljević	26 – 7 May 1987	1.88 m (6 ft 2 in)	ZVVZ UŠK Prague	(Czech Republic)
F/C	11	Milka Bjelica	31 – 22 June 1981	1.92 m (6 ft 4 in)	Beşiktaş JK	(Turkey)
C	12	Iva Perovanović	29 – 1 September 1983	1.88 m (6 ft 2 in)	Nadezhda Orenburg	(Russia)
C	13	Ana Turčinović	19 – 20 October 1993	1.89 m (6 ft 2 in)	Antakya Belediyespor	(Turkey)
F/C	14	Milica Jovanović	23 – 14 August 1989	1.89 m (6 ft 2 in)	Beşiktaş JK	(Turkey)
G	15	Jelena Ćulafić	24 – 8 June 1989	1.75 m (5 ft 9 in)	Željezničar Sarajevo	(Bosnia and Herzegovina)

Head coach

- (Montenegro) Miodrag Baletić

Assistant coaches

- (Montenegro) Rade Petrović

Legend

- Club – describes last
  club before the tournament
- Age – describes age
  on 15 June 2013

=== Slovakia ===
The roster was announced on 4 June 2013.

Slovakia women's national basketball team – EuroBasket Women 2013 roster
Players
Coaches

Pos.	No.	Name	Age – Date of birth	Height	Club	Ctr.
SF	4	Dominika Baburová	22 – 29 May 1991	1.82 m (6 ft 0 in)	MBK Ružomberok	(Slovakia)
SF	5	Katarína Tetemondová	24 – 24 September 1988	1.86 m (6 ft 1 in)	MBK Ružomberok	(Slovakia)
PF	6	Lucia Kupčíková	28 – 28 August 1984	1.86 m (6 ft 1 in)	Good Angels Košice	(Slovakia)
PG	7	Zuzana Brezániová	26 – 4 March 1987	1.68 m (5 ft 6 in)	MBK Ružomberok	(Slovakia)
C	8	Klaudia Lukačovičová	22 – 25 November 1990	1.92 m (6 ft 4 in)	MBK Ružomberok	(Slovakia)
PF	9	Barbora Fabianová	30 – 18 October 1982	1.84 m (6 ft 0 in)	CUS Cagliari	(Italy)
PG	10	Gabriela Kubatová	29 – 26 May 1984	1.72 m (5 ft 8 in)	Roche Vendée Basket	(France)
SG	11	Timea Sujová	29 – 26 February 1984	1.75 m (5 ft 9 in)	ŠBK Šamorín	(Slovakia)
C	12	Romana Vyňuchalová	26 – 3 September 1986	1.93 m (6 ft 4 in)	ŠBK Šamorín	(Slovakia)
C	13	Anna Jurčenková	27 – 26 July 1985	1.95 m (6 ft 5 in)	BK Brno	(Czech Republic)
PF	14	Eva Kmeťová	25 – 6 August 1987	1.83 m (6 ft 0 in)	MBK Ružomberok	(Slovakia)
C	15	Lucia Krč-Turbová	24 – 1 June 1989	1.86 m (6 ft 1 in)	Piešťanské Čajky	(Slovakia)

Head coach

- (Slovakia) Ivan Vojtko

Legend

- Club – describes last
  club before the tournament
- Age – describes age
  on 15 June 2013

=== Turkey ===
The roster was announced on 7 June 2013.

Turkey women's national basketball team – EuroBasket Women 2013 roster
Players
Coaches

Pos.	No.	Name	Age – Date of birth	Height	Club	Ctr.
SG	4	Tuğba Palazoğlu	32 – 4 December 1980	1.73 m (5 ft 8 in)	İstanbul Üniversitesi	(Turkey)
PF	5	Tuğçe Canıtez	22 – 10 November 1990	1.90 m (6 ft 3 in)	Fenerbahçe	(Turkey)
SG	6	Ayşegül Günay	20 – 26 October 1992	1.72 m (5 ft 8 in)	Kayseri Kaski	(Turkey)
PG	7	Birsel Vardarlı	28 – 12 July 1984	1.74 m (5 ft 9 in)	Fenerbahçe	(Turkey)
SF	8	Yasemin Begüm Dalgalar	25 – 8 June 1988	1.85 m (6 ft 1 in)	Kayseri Kaski	(Turkey)
PG	9	Esmeral Tunçluer	33 – 7 June 1980	1.74 m (5 ft 9 in)	Fenerbahçe	(Turkey)
PG	10	Işıl Alben	27 – 22 February 1986	1.70 m (5 ft 7 in)	Galatasaray	(Turkey)
C	11	Nevriye Yılmaz	32 – 16 June 1980	1.94 m (6 ft 4 in)	Galatasaray	(Turkey)
PF	12	Naile Çırak	28 – 29 May 1985	1.85 m (6 ft 1 in)	Homend Antakya Belediyesi	(Turkey)
C	13	Quanitra Hollingsworth	24 – 15 November 1988	1.96 m (6 ft 5 in)	Fenerbahçe	(Turkey)
SF	14	Şaziye İvegin	31 – 8 February 1982	1.82 m (6 ft 0 in)	Galatasaray	(Turkey)
PF	15	Bahar Çağlar	24 – 28 September 1988	1.90 m (6 ft 3 in)	Galatasaray	(Turkey)

Head coach

- (Turkey) Ceyhun Yıldızoğlu

Assistant coach

- (Turkey) Erman Okerman
- (Turkey) Erkan Metin
- (Turkey) Ömer Buharalı

Legend

- (C) Team captain
- Club field describes current club

=== Ukraine ===
The roster was announced on 13 June 2013.

Ukraine women's national basketball team – EuroBasket Women 2013 roster
Players
Coaches

Pos.	No.	Name	Age – Date of birth	Height	Club	Ctr.
PG	4	Olga Dubrovina	26 – 2 May 1987	1.73 m (5 ft 8 in)	Neftochimic	(Bulgaria)
G	5	Olena Samburska	24 – 31 January 1989	1.74 m (5 ft 9 in)	WBC Montana	(Bulgaria)
G	6	Krystyna Matsko	22 – 15 June 1991	1.81 m (5 ft 11 in)	TIM-SKUF Kyiv	(Ukraine)
PG	7	Inna Kochubei	31 – 5 April 1982	1.73 m (5 ft 8 in)	TIM-SKUF Kyiv	(Ukraine)
SF	8	Kateryna Dorogobuzova	22 – 28 June 1990	1.85 m (6 ft 1 in)	PINKK-Pécsi 424	(Hungary)
F	9	Oleksandra Kurasova	27 – 4 April 1986	1.86 m (6 ft 1 in)	Rivas Ecópolis	(Spain)
F	10	Ganna Zarytska	27 – 8 June 1986	1.85 m (6 ft 1 in)	TIM-SKUF Kyiv	(Ukraine)
G/F	11	Alina Iagupova	21 – 9 February 1992	1.83 m (6 ft 0 in)	WBC Dynamo Kyiv	(Ukraine)
C	12	Lyubov Alyoshkina	31 – 23 August 1981	2.00 m (6 ft 7 in)	Olimpia Grodno	(Belarus)
PF	13	Viktoria Mircheva	26 – 17 January 1987	1.90 m (6 ft 3 in)	Nantes-Rezé Basket	(France)
F	14	Olena Ogorodnikova	32 – 30 May 1981	1.86 m (6 ft 1 in)
C	15	Oleksandra Khomenchuk	24 – 4 February 1989	2.02 m (6 ft 8 in)	Horizont Minsk	(Belarus)

Head coach

- (Ukraine) Vadim Czeczuro

Legend

- Club – describes last
  club before the tournament
- Age – describes age
  on 15 June 2013

== Group B ==
=== Italy ===
The roster was announced on 12 June 2013.

Italy women's national basketball team – EuroBasket Women 2013 roster
Players
Coaches

Pos.	No.	Name	Age – Date of birth	Height	Club	Ctr.
PG	4	Francesca Dotto	20 – 17 March 1993	1.68 m (5 ft 6 in)	BF Le Mura Lucca	(Italy)
SG	5	Martina Fassina	25 – 19 March 1988	1.82 m (6 ft 0 in)	Ceprini Costruzioni Orvieto	(Italy)
PF	6	Sabrina Cinili	24 – 22 April 1989	1.91 m (6 ft 3 in)	PF Umbertide	(Italy)
PG	7	Giorgia Sottana	24 – 15 December 1988	1.77 m (5 ft 10 in)	PF Schio	(Italy)
PG	8	Giulia Gatti	24 – 13 June 1989	1.70 m (5 ft 7 in)	Taranto Cras Basket	(Italy)
PF	9	Ilaria Zanoni	27 – 25 January 1986	1.88 m (6 ft 2 in)	Taranto Cras Basket	(Italy)
SG	10	Gaia Gorini	21 – 8 January 1992	1.80 m (5 ft 11 in)	PF Umbertide	(Italy)
PF	11	Raffaella Masciadri	32 – 30 September 1980	1.85 m (6 ft 1 in)	PF Schio	(Italy)
PF	12	Nnena Wabara	31 – 23 October 1981	1.83 m (6 ft 0 in)	Taranto Cras Basket	(Italy)
PG	13	Benedetta Bagnara	26 – 7 February 1987	1.80 m (5 ft 11 in)	BF Le Mura Lucca	(Italy)
C	14	Kathrin Ress	27 – 26 June 1985	1.96 m (6 ft 5 in)	BF Le Mura Lucca	(Italy)
C	15	Alessandra Formica	20 – 13 March 1993	1.89 m (6 ft 2 in)	Reyer Venezia Mestre	(Italy)

Head coach

- (Italy) Roberto Ricchini

Assistant coaches

- (Italy) Giovanni Lucchesi

Legend

- Club – describes last
  club before the tournament
- Age – describes age
  on 15 June 2013

=== Russia ===
The roster was announced on 12 June 2013.

Russia women's national basketball team – EuroBasket Women 2013 roster
Players
Coaches

Pos.	No.	Name	Age – Date of birth	Height	Club	Ctr.
SF	4	Valeriya Musina	25 – 18 August 1987	1.79 m (5 ft 10 in)	CCC Polkowice	(Poland)
SG	5	Evgeniya Belyakova	26 – 27 June 1986	1.84 m (6 ft 0 in)	WBC Spartak Moscow Region	(Russia)
PF	6	Natalia Vodopyanova	32 – 4 June 1981	1.88 m (6 ft 2 in)	Dynamo Kursk	(Russia)
PF	7	Marina Kuzina	27 – 19 July 1985	1.95 m (6 ft 5 in)	WBC Spartak Moscow Region	(Russia)
SG	8	Epiphanny Prince	25 – 11 January 1988	1.75 m (5 ft 9 in)	Dynamo Kursk	(Russia)
SG	9	Liudmila Sapova	29 – 3 May 1984	1.86 m (6 ft 1 in)	Nadezhda Orenburg	(Russia)
SF	10	Ilona Korstin	33 – 30 May 1980	1.82 m (6 ft 0 in)	Dynamo Moscow	(Russia)
C	11	Natalya Vieru	23 – 25 July 1989	2.00 m (6 ft 7 in)	WBC Spartak Moscow Region	(Russia)
C	12	Irina Osipova	31 – 25 June 1981	1.96 m (6 ft 5 in)	İstanbul Üniversitesi	(Turkey)
PF	13	Anna Petrakova	28 – 4 December 1984	1.88 m (6 ft 2 in)	UMMC Ekaterinburg	(Russia)
SG	14	Natalya Zhedik	24 – 11 July 1988	1.84 m (6 ft 0 in)	Nadezhda Orenburg	(Russia)
PF	15	Nadezhda Grishaeva	23 – 2 July 1989	1.95 m (6 ft 5 in)	Dynamo Moscow	(Russia)

Head coach

- (Lithuania) Alfredas Vainauskas

Legend

- Club – describes last
  club before the tournament
- Age – describes age
  on 15 June 2013

=== Spain ===
The roster was announced on 10 June 2013.

Spain women's national basketball team – EuroBasket Women 2013 roster
Players
Coaches

Pos.	No.	Name	Age – Date of birth	Height	Club	Ctr.
F/C	4	Laura Nicholls	24 – 26 February 1989	1.89 m (6 ft 2 in)	Rivas Ecópolis	(Spain)
C	5	Cindy Lima	31 – 21 June 1981	1.96 m (6 ft 5 in)	Uni Seat Győr	(Hungary)
PG	6	Sílvia Domínguez	26 – 31 January 1987	1.66 m (5 ft 5 in)	UMMC Ekaterinburg	(Russia)
F	7	Alba Torrens	23 – 30 August 1989	1.92 m (6 ft 4 in)	Galatasaray S.K.	(Turkey)
G	8	Cristina Ouviña	22 – 18 September 1990	1.74 m (5 ft 9 in)	TS Wisła Can-Pack Kraków	(Poland)
PG	9	Laia Palau	33 – 10 September 1979	1.76 m (5 ft 9 in)	CCC Polkowice (basketball team)	(Poland)
PG	10	Elisa Aguilar	36 – 15 October 1976	1.72 m (5 ft 8 in)	WBC Spartak Moscow Region	(Russia)
G	11	Marta Xargay	22 – 20 December 1990	1.81 m (5 ft 11 in)	Perfumerías Avenida Baloncesto	(Spain)
C	12	Laura Gil	21 – 24 April 1992	1.92 m (6 ft 4 in)	CB Ciudad de Burgos	(Spain)
SF	13	Amaya Valdemoro	36 – 18 August 1976	1.83 m (6 ft 0 in)	Real Canoe NC	(Spain)
C	14	Sancho Lyttle	29 – 20 September 1983	1.90 m (6 ft 3 in)	Galatasaray S.K.	(Turkey)
SG	15	Queralt Casas	20 – 18 November 1992	1.78 m (5 ft 10 in)	Rivas Ecópolis	(Spain)

Head coach

- (Spain) Lucas Mondelo

Assistant coaches

- (Spain) Victor Lapena
- (Spain) Isabel Sánchez

Legend

- Club – describes last
  club before the tournament
- Age – describes age
  on 15 June 2013

=== Sweden ===
The roster was announced on 3 June 2013.

Sweden women's national basketball team – EuroBasket Women 2013 roster
Players
Coaches

Pos.	No.	Name	Age – Date of birth	Height	Club	Ctr.
SG	4	Frida Aili	25 – 22 April 1988	1.80 m (5 ft 11 in)	Northland Basket	(Sweden)
SG	5	Malin Aasa	26 – 14 June 1987	1.76 m (5 ft 9 in)	Norrköping Dolphins	(Sweden)
SG	6	Frida Eldebrink	25 – 4 January 1988	1.74 m (5 ft 9 in)	CJM Bourges Basket	(France)
G/F	7	Ashley Key	28 – 1 June 1985	1.83 m (6 ft 0 in)	Mark Basket	(Sweden)
PF	8	Kadidja Andersson	33 – 7 February 1980	1.83 m (6 ft 0 in)	MBK Ružomberok	(Slovakia)
PG	9	Elin Eldebrink	25 – 4 January 1988	1.74 m (5 ft 9 in)	CUS Cagliari	(Italy)
SF	10	Elisabeth Egnell	25 – 19 November 1987	1.86 m (6 ft 1 in)	Norrköping Dolphins	(Sweden)
F	11	Danielle Hamilton	23 – 23 January 1990	1.86 m (6 ft 1 in)	Georgia Tech Yellow Jackets	(United States)
PF	12	Anna Barthold	33 – 31 March 1980	1.85 m (6 ft 1 in)	Northland Basket	(Slovakia)
G	13	Stefanie Yderström	23 – 23 April 1990	1.74 m (5 ft 9 in)	University of Miami	(United States)
C	14	Louice Halvarsson	24 – 15 January 1989	1.91 m (6 ft 3 in)	CUS Cagliari	(Italy)
C	15	Katarina Andersson	30 – 19 May 1983	1.94 m (6 ft 4 in)	Solna Vikings	(Sweden)

Head coach

- (Sweden) Lars Johansson

Assistant coaches

- (Lithuania) Jurgita Kausaite
- (Sweden) David Leman

Legend

- Club – describes last
  club before the tournament
- Age – describes age
  on 15 June 2013

== Group C ==
=== France ===
The roster was announced on 14 June 2013.

France women's national basketball team – EuroBasket Women 2013 roster
Players
Coaches

Pos.	No.	Name	Age – Date of birth	Height	Club	Ctr.
C	4	Isabelle Yacoubou	27 – 21 April 1986	1.90 m (6 ft 3 in)	WBC Spartak Moscow Region	(Russia)
F	5	Endéné Miyem	25 – 15 May 1988	1.88 m (6 ft 2 in)	CJM Bourges Basket	(France)
SF	6	Diandra Tchatchouang	22 – 14 June 1991	1.89 m (6 ft 2 in)	Perpignan Basket	(France)
C	7	Sandrine Gruda	25 – 25 June 1987	1.92 m (6 ft 4 in)	UMMC Ekaterinburg	(Russia)
PG	8	Edwige Lawson-Wade	34 – 14 May 1979	1.67 m (5 ft 6 in)	Basket Lattes	(France)
PG	9	Céline Dumerc	30 – 9 July 1982	1.69 m (5 ft 7 in)	CJM Bourges Basket	(France)
G/F	10	Valériane Ayayi	19 – 29 April 1994	1.85 m (6 ft 1 in)	Basket Landes	(France)
SG	11	Émilie Gomis	29 – 18 October 1983	1.78 m (5 ft 10 in)	Basket Lattes	(France)
PF	12	Marielle Amant	23 – 9 December 1989	1.91 m (6 ft 3 in)	Nantes-Rezé Basket	(France)
SG	13	Gaëlle Skrela	30 – 24 January 1983	1.77 m (5 ft 10 in)	Basket Lattes	(France)
C	14	Emmeline Ndongue	30 – 25 April 1983	1.92 m (6 ft 4 in)	CJM Bourges Basket	(France)
G	15	Anaël Lardy	25 – 24 October 1987	1.70 m (5 ft 7 in)	ZVVZ UŠK Prague	(Czech Republic)

Head coach

- (France) Pierre Vincent

Assistant coaches

- (France) Francois Brisson
- (France) Valérie Garnier
- (France) Thierry Moullec

Legend

- Club – describes last
  club before the tournament
- Age – describes age
  on 15 June 2013

=== Great Britain ===
The roster was announced on 11 June 2013.

Great Britain women's national basketball team – EuroBasket Women 2013 roster
Players
Coaches

Pos.	No.	Name	Age – Date of birth	Height	Club	Ctr.
G	4	Georgia Jones	23 – 3 April 1990	1.70 m (5 ft 7 in)	WBC Universitatea Cluj	(Romania)
G	5	Rose Anderson	25 – 23 March 1988	1.78 m (5 ft 10 in)	Nantes-Rezé Basket 44	(France)
SG	6	Stef Collins	30 – 30 December 1982	1.68 m (5 ft 6 in)	Cardiff Archers	(United Kingdom)
PG	7	Rachael Vanderwal	29 – 27 June 1983	1.76 m (5 ft 9 in)	University of Limerick	(Republic of Ireland)
F	8	Chantelle Handy	25 – 16 June 1987	1.91 m (6 ft 3 in)	Mersin Büyükşehir Belediyesi	(Turkey)
G	9	Lauren Thomas-Johnson	25 – 25 May 1988	1.80 m (5 ft 11 in)	Sheffield Hatters	(United Kingdom)
F	10	Ella Clark	31 – 8 February 1982	1.90 m (6 ft 3 in)	California State University	(United States)
PF	11	Kim Butler	30 – 7 September 1982	1.85 m (6 ft 1 in)	SK Cēsis	(Latvia)
C	12	Dominique Allen	23 – 10 September 1989	1.92 m (6 ft 4 in)	Nova Bologna	(Italy)
G	13	Jo Leedham	25 – 5 December 1987	1.80 m (5 ft 11 in)	CJM Bourges Basket	(France)
C	14	Azania Stewart	24 – 13 March 1989	1.95 m (6 ft 5 in)	PINKK-Pécsi 424	(Hungary)
F	15	Stephanie Gandy	31 – 10 May 1982	1.78 m (5 ft 10 in)	Sheffield Hatters	(United Kingdom)

Head coach

- (United Kingdom) Damian Jennings

Assistant coaches

- (United Kingdom) Vanessa Ellis
- (United Kingdom) Peter Buckle

Legend

- Club – describes last
  club before the tournament
- Age – describes age
  on 15 June 2013

=== Latvia ===
The roster was announced on 5 June 2013.

Latvia women's national basketball team – EuroBasket Women 2013 roster
Players
Coaches

Pos.	No.	Name	Age – Date of birth	Height	Club	Ctr.
SG	4	Kitija Laksa	17 – 21 May 1996	1.82 m (6 ft 0 in)	TTT Riga	(Latvia)
PG	5	Anda Eibele	28 – 30 July 1984	1.70 m (5 ft 7 in)	SK Cēsis	(Latvia)
PF	6	Līga Šurkusa	21 – 16 July 1991	1.93 m (6 ft 4 in)	Cignoli Broni	(Italy)
PG	7	Elīna Babkina	24 – 24 April 1989	1.76 m (5 ft 9 in)	ZVVZ UŠK Prague	(Czech Republic)
SF	8	Dita Liepkalne	26 – 30 April 1987	1.82 m (6 ft 0 in)	SK Cēsis	(Latvia)
PF	9	Liene Jansone	32 – 22 May 1981	1.88 m (6 ft 2 in)	Tarsus Belediyesi	(Turkey)
SF	10	Anete Horelika	25 – 23 July 1987	1.78 m (5 ft 10 in)	Pro Build Lions	(Netherlands)
SG	11	Ieva Krastiņa	22 – 22 July 1990	1.77 m (5 ft 10 in)	TTT Riga	(Latvia)
SF	12	Zane Jākobsone	27 – 30 November 1985	1.80 m (5 ft 11 in)	SK Cēsis	(Latvia)
SG	13	Kristīne Kārkliņa	29 – 30 September 1983	1.75 m (5 ft 9 in)	Ceyhan Belediye	(Turkey)
PF	14	Anete Šteinberga	23 – 29 January 1990	1.90 m (6 ft 3 in)	UTEP Miners	(United States)
C	15	Aija Brumermane	26 – 17 October 1986	1.91 m (6 ft 3 in)	PINKK-Pécsi 424	(Hungary)

Head coach

- (Latvia) Aigars Nerips

Assistant coaches

- (Latvia) Ainārs Čukste
- (Latvia) Vents Kārkliņš

Legend

- Club – describes last
  club before the tournament
- Age – describes age
  on 15 June 2013

=== Serbia ===
The roster was announced on 11 June 2013.

Serbia women's national basketball team – EuroBasket Women 2013 roster
Players
Coaches

Pos.	No.	Name	Age – Date of birth	Height	Club	Ctr.
PG	4	Tamara Radočaj	25 – 23 December 1987	1.70 m (5 ft 7 in)	Partizan	(Serbia)
PF	5	Bojana Vulić	29 – 28 May 1984	1.91 m (6 ft 3 in)	Canik Belediyespor	(Turkey)
SG	6	Saša Čađo	23 – 13 July 1989	1.78 m (5 ft 10 in)	Partizan	(Serbia)
C	7	Sara Krnjić	21 – 15 July 1991	1.92 m (6 ft 4 in)	UNIQA Euroleasing Sopron	(Hungary)
SG	8	Nevena Jovanović	22 – 30 June 1990	1.78 m (5 ft 10 in)	Partizan	(Serbia)
PF	9	Jelena Milovanović	24 – 28 April 1989	1.90 m (6 ft 3 in)	UNIQA Euroleasing Sopron	(Hungary)
SG	10	Dajana Butulija	27 – 23 February 1986	1.75 m (5 ft 9 in)	Partizan	(Serbia)
C	11	Ivanka Matić	34 – 29 May 1979	1.93 m (6 ft 4 in)	Club Sportiv Municipal Târgoviște	(Romania)
PF	12	Ines Ajanović	32 – 12 November 1980	1.96 m (6 ft 5 in)	SK Cēsis	(Latvia)
SG	13	Milica Dabović	31 – 16 February 1982	1.75 m (5 ft 9 in)	Partizan	(Serbia)
SG	14	Ana Dabović	23 – 18 August 1989	1.83 m (6 ft 0 in)	TED Ankara Kolejliler	(Turkey)
PF	15	Jovana Rad	26 – 8 May 1987	1.87 m (6 ft 2 in)	Tarbes Gespe Bigorre	(France)

Head coach

- (Serbia) Marina Maljković

Assistant coaches

- (Serbia) Igor Polenek
- (Serbia) Bojan Janković

Legend

- Club – describes last
  club before the tournament
- Age – describes age
  on 15 June 2013

== Group D ==
=== Belarus ===
The roster was announced on 9 June 2013.

Belarus women's national basketball team – EuroBasket Women 2013 roster
Players
Coaches

Pos.	No.	Name	Age – Date of birth	Height	Club	Ctr.
PF	4	Volha Istseliatsova	24 – 27 October 1988	1.89 m (6 ft 2 in)	BC Tsmoki-Minsk	(Belarus)
SG	5	Aliaksandra Tarasava	24 – 23 June 1988	1.70 m (5 ft 7 in)	ZVVZ UŠK Prague	(Czech Republic)
SF	6	Katsiaryna Snytsina	27 – 2 September 1985	1.88 m (6 ft 2 in)	Chevakata Vologda	(Russia)
SF	7	Ala Murauskaya	28 – 22 March 1985	1.86 m (6 ft 1 in)	Berezina Borisov	(Belarus)
SG	8	Tatsiana Likhtarovich	25 – 29 March 1988	1.80 m (5 ft 11 in)	Fortuna Klaipėda	(Lithuania)
SG	9	Natallia Anufryienka	28 – 11 June 1985	1.75 m (5 ft 9 in)	Horizont Minsk	(Belarus)
C	10	Anastasiya Verameyenka	25 – 10 July 1987	1.95 m (6 ft 5 in)	Fenerbahçe	(Turkey)
C	11	Yelena Leuchanka	30 – 30 April 1983	1.95 m (6 ft 5 in)	Liaoning Hengye	(China)
PG	12	Zhanna Haradzetskaya	33 – 11 October 1979	1.78 m (5 ft 10 in)	BC Tsmoki-Minsk	(Belarus)
PF	13	Maryia Papova	18 – 13 July 1994	1.89 m (6 ft 2 in)	Olimpia Grodno	(Belarus)
SF	14	Nataliya Trafimava	33 – 16 June 1979	1.88 m (6 ft 2 in)	Energiya Ivanovo	(Russia)
C	15	Marina Kress	32 – 23 August 1980	1.94 m (6 ft 4 in)	Horizont Minsk	(Belarus)

Head coach

- (Belarus) Rimantas Grigas

Assistant coaches

- (Belarus) Andrei Vauleu
- (Belarus) Natallia Maslava

Legend

- Club – describes last
  club before the tournament
- Age – describes age
  on 15 June 2013

=== Croatia ===
The roster was announced on 12 June 2013.

Croatia women's national basketball team – EuroBasket Women 2013 roster
Players
Coaches

Pos.	No.	Name	Age – Date of birth	Height	Club	Ctr.
SG	4	Jelena Ivezić	29 – 17 March 1984	1.82 m (6 ft 0 in)	Ceyhan Belediyespor	(Turkey)
PG	5	Anđa Jelavić	32 – 21 September 1980	1.71 m (5 ft 7 in)	Samsun B.K.	(Turkey)
PG	6	Antonija Mišura	25 – 19 May 1988	1.78 m (5 ft 10 in)	Jolly JBS	(Croatia)
PF	7	Kristina Benić	25 – 4 June 1988	1.83 m (6 ft 0 in)	Jolly JBS	(Croatia)
SG	8	Emanuela Salopek	26 – 18 April 1987	1.78 m (5 ft 10 in)	Gospić	(Croatia)
C	9	Marija Vrsaljko	23 – 8 August 1989	1.96 m (6 ft 5 in)	CB Avenida	(Spain)
PG	10	Iva Ciglar	27 – 12 December 1985	1.71 m (5 ft 7 in)	Perpignan Basket	(France)
SF	11	Ana Lelas	30 – 2 April 1983	1.82 m (6 ft 0 in)	Basket Lattes	(France)
C	12	Iva Slišković	28 – 4 September 1984	1.90 m (6 ft 3 in)	BK 04 AC LB Spisska Nova Ves	(Slovakia)
SG	13	Matea Vrdoljak	27 – 19 November 1985	1.83 m (6 ft 0 in)	Novi Zagreb	(Croatia)
C	14	Luca Ivanković	25 – 26 September 1987	2.00 m (6 ft 7 in)	Jolly JBS	(Croatia)
SF	15	Monika Bosilj	27 – 23 December 1985	1.78 m (5 ft 10 in)	Gospić	(Croatia)

Head coach

- (Croatia) Stipe Bralić

Legend

- Club – describes last
  club before the tournament
- Age – describes age
  on 15 June 2013

=== Czech Republic ===
The roster was announced on 9 June 2013.

Czech Republic women's national basketball team – EuroBasket Women 2013 roster
Players
Coaches

Pos.	No.	Name	Age – Date of birth	Height	Club	Ctr.
SF	4	Jana Veselá	29 – 31 December 1983	1.94 m (6 ft 4 in)	Homend Antakya	(Turkey)
SF	5	Michaela Zrůstová	26 – 4 April 1987	1.86 m (6 ft 1 in)	ZVVZ UŠK Prague	(Czech Republic)
PG	6	Veronika Bortelová	35 – 11 June 1978	1.69 m (5 ft 7 in)	Darüşşafaka S.K.	(Turkey)
PF	7	Alena Hanušová	22 – 29 May 1991	1.90 m (6 ft 3 in)	BK Brno	(Czech Republic)
C	8	Ilona Burgrová	29 – 15 March 1984	1.96 m (6 ft 5 in)	ZVVZ UŠK Prague	(Czech Republic)
PG	9	Kateřina Bartoňová	23 – 17 January 1990	1.73 m (5 ft 8 in)	Sedis Bàsquet	(Spain)
PF	10	Romana Hejdová	25 – 9 May 1988	1.84 m (6 ft 0 in)	BK Brno	(Czech Republic)
SG	11	Kateřina Elhotová	23 – 14 October 1989	1.81 m (5 ft 11 in)	ZVVZ UŠK Prague	(Czech Republic)
SG	12	Tereza Vyoralová	19 – 16 January 1994	1.76 m (5 ft 9 in)	ZVVZ UŠK Prague	(Czech Republic)
C	13	Petra Kulichová	28 – 13 September 1984	1.98 m (6 ft 6 in)	Good Angels Košice	(Slovakia)
SF	14	Tereza Pecková	25 – 10 July 1987	1.89 m (6 ft 2 in)	BK Brno	(Czech Republic)
SG	15	Katerina Hindraková	25 – 9 February 1988	1.76 m (5 ft 9 in)	Kara Trutnov	(Czech Republic)

Head coach

- (Czech Republic) Lubor Blažek

Assistant coaches

- (Czech Republic) Ivan Benes
- (Czech Republic) Martin Petrovický

Legend

- Club – describes last
  club before the tournament
- Age – describes age
  on 15 June 2013

=== Lithuania ===
The roster was announced on 4 June 2013.

Lithuania women's national basketball team – EuroBasket Women 2013 roster
Players
Coaches

Pos.	No.	Name	Age – Date of birth	Height	Club	Ctr.
PG	4	Gabrielė Gutkauskaitė	22 – 26 October 1990	1.76 m (5 ft 9 in)	Fortūna Klaipėda	(Lithuania)
SF	5	Kamilė Nacickaitė	23 – 28 December 1989	1.81 m (5 ft 11 in)	CUS Chieti	(Italy)
PG	6	Inesa Visgaudaitė	22 – 20 May 1991	1.69 m (5 ft 7 in)	Toulouse Métropole Basket	(France)
SF	7	Mantė Kvederavičiūtė	22 – 28 November 1990	1.80 m (5 ft 11 in)	Kibirkstis Vilnius	(Lithuania)
PF	8	Lina Pikčiūtė	22 – 17 November 1990	1.92 m (6 ft 4 in)	Kibirkstis Vilnius	(Lithuania)
PG	9	Rasa Žemantauskaitė	32 – 11 January 1981	1.76 m (5 ft 9 in)	Sirenos Kaunas	(Lithuania)
PF	10	Monika Grigalauskytė	21 – 17 February 1992	1.90 m (6 ft 3 in)	Fortūna Klaipėda	(Lithuania)
PF	11	Giedrė Paugaitė	22 – 15 July 1990	1.92 m (6 ft 4 in)	USO Mondeville	(France)
C	12	Iveta Šalkauskė	31 – 3 February 1982	1.94 m (6 ft 4 in)	Sirenos Kaunas	(Lithuania)
C	13	Gintarė Petronytė	24 – 19 March 1989	1.95 m (6 ft 5 in)	Taranto Cras Basket	(Italy)
PF	14	Kristina Vengrytė	31 – 21 December 1981	1.86 m (6 ft 1 in)	Kibirkstis Vilnius	(Lithuania)
C	15	Eglė Šikšniūtė	22 – 16 May 1991	1.98 m (6 ft 6 in)	Fortūna Klaipėda	(Lithuania)

Head coach

- (Lithuania) Algirdas Paulauskas

Legend

- Club – describes last
  club before the tournament
- Age – describes age
  on 15 June 2013
