= EuroBasket Women 2013 =

2013 edition of the EuroBasket Women

EuroBasket 2013 Women
34th FIBA European Women's Basketball Championship
- Eurobasket Women 2013 logo

Tournament details
- Host country: France
- Dates: 15 – 30 June 2013
- Teams: 16
- Venues: 5 (in 5 host cities)

Final positions
- Champions: Spain (2nd title)
- Runners-up: France
- Third place: Turkey
- Fourth place: Serbia

Tournament statistics
- MVP: (Spain) Sancho Lyttle
- Top scorer: (Spain) Lyttle (18.4)
- Top rebounds: (Spain) Lyttle (11.1)
- Top assists: (United Kingdom) Leedham (4.5)
- PPG (Team): Spain (73.4)
- RPG (Team): Great Britain (41.5)
- APG (Team): Spain (15.8)

Official website
- Website

The 2013 European Women Basketball Championship, commonly called EuroBasket Women 2013, was the 34th regional championship held by FIBA Europe. The competition was held in France from 15 to 30 June 2013. This was the fourth time that the EuroBasket Women has been hosted by France.

Spain defeated France 70–69 in the final to win the title.

== Venues ==
Venues Map

City	Arena	Capacity
Lille	Palais des sports Saint-Sauveur	1,850
Mouilleron-le-Captif	Vendéspace	4,000
Orchies	Pévèle Arena	5,000
Trélazé	Arena Loire	5,000
Vannes	Complexe sportif du Kercado	1,700

== Qualified teams ==
The Qualifying Round was held from June 12 to July 14, 2012.

Country	Qualified as	Date qualification was secured	Last appearance	Best placement in tournament
France	Hosts	5 December 2010	2011	Champion (2001, 2009)
Russia	EuroBasket 2011 Winner	29 June 2011	2011	Champion (2003, 2007, 2011)
Turkey	EuroBasket 2011 Runner-up	30 June 2011	2011	Runner-up (2011)
Czech Republic	EuroBasket 2011 Fourth place	29 June 2011	2011	Champion (2005)
Croatia	EuroBasket 2011 Fifth place	2 July 2011	2011	5th place (2011)
Great Britain	2012 Summer Olympics hosts	6 July 2005	2011	11th place (2011)
Belarus	Qualification Group A Winner	11 July 2012	2011	3rd place (2007)
Ukraine	Qualification Group A Runner-up	14 July 2012	2009	Champion (1995)
Montenegro	Qualification Group B Winner	11 July 2012	2011	6th place (2011)
Serbia	Qualification Group B Runner-up	14 July 2012	2009	5th place (2001)
Slovakia	Qualification Group C Winner	11 July 2012	2011	Runner-up (1997)
Lithuania	Qualification Group C Runner-up	7 July 2012	2011	Champion (1997)
Sweden	Qualification Group D Winner	7 July 2012	1987	7th place (1987)
Spain	Qualification Group D Runner-up	7 July 2012	2011	Champion (1993)
Italy	Qualification Group E Winner	11 July 2012	2009	Champion (1938)
Latvia	Qualification Group E Runner-up	11 July 2012	2011	4th place (2007)

== Group draw ==
The draw took place on September 21, 2012 at 16:30 local time at Paris, France.

=== Seedings ===
The seeding was announced on September 18, 2012.

Pot 1	Pot 2	Pot 3	Pot 4
Russia; Turkey; France; Czech Republic	Croatia; Great Britain; Italy; Slovakia	Sweden; Serbia; Lithuania; Montenegro	Spain; Belarus; Latvia; Ukraine

=== Draw ===
Group A	Group B	Group C	Group D
Turkey; Slovakia; Montenegro; Ukraine	Russia; Italy; Sweden; Spain	France; Great Britain; Serbia; Latvia	Czech Republic; Croatia; Lithuania; Belarus

== Preliminary round ==
The schedule was announced on 5 November 2012.

All times are local (UTC+2).

=== Group A ===
Team	Pld	W	L	PF	PA	PD	Pts
Turkey	3	3	0	210	157	+53	6
Montenegro	3	2	1	206	189	+17	5
Slovakia	3	1	2	186	211	−25	4
Ukraine	3	0	3	180	225	−45	3

15 June 2013
12:30

Boxscore

Montenegro	77–63	Slovakia
Scoring by quarter: 14–18, 19–17, 26–17, 18–11
Pts: Dubljević 20; Rebs: Dubljević 8 Asts: Dubljević, Perovanović 4		Pts: Tetemondová, Vyňuchalová 13; Rebs: Vyňuchalová 7 Asts: Kubatová 5

Complexe sportif du Kercado, Vannes
Attendance: 1,000
Referees: Ingus Baumanis (LAT), Fabiana Martinescu (ROU), Aliaksandr Syrytsa (BLR)

15 June 2013
18:30

Boxscore

Ukraine	52–78	Turkey
Scoring by quarter: 11–24, 21–16, 8–22, 12–16
Pts: Kurasova, Mircheva 8 Rebs: Ogorodnikova 8 Asts: Dubrovina, Kochubei 4		Pts: Hollingsworth 15; Rebs: Çağlar 7 Asts: Alben 7

Complexe sportif du Kercado, Vannes
Attendance: 1,450
Referees: Aleksandar Glisic (SRB), Ilona Kucerova (CZE), Carole Delauné (FRA)

16 June 2013
12:30

Boxscore

Slovakia	75–68	Ukraine
Scoring by quarter: 20–28, 24–9, 17–14, 14–17
Pts: Lukačovičová 23; Rebs: Lukačovičová 9 Asts: Sujová 7		Pts: Iagupova 17; Rebs: Mircheva 7 Asts: Dubrovina 4

Complexe sportif du Kercado, Vannes
Attendance: 550
Referees: Haydn Jones (WAL), Aleksandar Glisic (SRB), Tomislav Hordov (CRO)

16 June 2013
15:00

Boxscore

Turkey	66–57	Montenegro
Scoring by quarter: 12–21, 17–7, 18–10, 19–19
Pts: Tunçluer, Palazoğlu 12; Rebs: Hollingsworth 7 Asts: Vardarlı 7		Pts: Perovanović 17; Rebs: Perovanović, Dubljević 8 Asts: Škerović 9

Complexe sportif du Kercado, Vannes
Attendance: 1,039
Referees: Nicolas Maestre (FRA), Maka Kupatadze (GEO), Nikolaos Somos (GRE)

17 June 2013
12:30

Boxscore

Montenegro	72–60	Ukraine
Scoring by quarter: 16–19, 15–11, 22–13, 19–17
Pts: Dubljević 29; Rebs: Dubljević 6 Asts: Dubljević 4		Pts: Iagupova 21; Rebs: Kurasova 7 Asts: Ogorodnikova 4

Complexe sportif du Kercado, Vannes
Attendance: 800
Referees: Jasmina Juras (SRB), Gintaras Vitkauskas (LTU), Antonis Demetriou (CYP)

17 June 2013
15:00

Boxscore

Turkey	66–48	Slovakia
Scoring by quarter: 12–12, 20–8, 19–18, 15–10
Pts: Palazoğlu 12; Rebs: Canıtez, Hollingsworth 7 Asts: Alben, Vardarlı 5		Pts: Jurčenková 10; Rebs: Jurčenková 9 Asts: Brezániová 3

Complexe sportif du Kercado, Vannes
Attendance: 783
Referees: Carole Delauné (FRA), Haydn Jones (WAL), Ilona Kucerova (CZE)

=== Group B ===
Team	Pld	W	L	PF	PA	PD	Pts
Spain	3	3	0	221	180	+41	6
Sweden	3	1	2	180	194	−14	4
Italy	3	1	2	189	206	−17	4
Russia	3	1	2	201	211	−10	4

15 June 2013
15:00

Boxscore

Sweden	63–64	Italy
Scoring by quarter: 13–12, 17–19, 19–20, 14–13
Pts: F. Eldebrink 23; Rebs: F. Eldebrink 8 Asts: F. Eldebrink 4		Pts: Ress 18; Rebs: Ress 14; Asts: Sottana 3

Complexe sportif du Kercado, Vannes
Attendance: 1,186
Referees: Haydn Jones (WAL), Antonis Demetriou (CYP), Tomislav Hordov (CRO)

15 June 2013
21:00

Boxscore

Spain	77–72	Russia
Scoring by quarter: 21–18, 17–11, 21–19, 18–24
Pts: Torrens 30; Rebs: Lyttle 8 Asts: Palau 4		Pts: Petrakova 18; Rebs: Osipova 9 Asts: Belyakova, Petrakova 3

Complexe sportif du Kercado, Vannes
Attendance: 1,466
Referees: Jasmina Juras (SRB), Nikolaos Somos (GRE), Nicolas Maestre (FRA)

16 June 2013
18:30

Boxscore

Italy	59–71	Spain
Scoring by quarter: 13–15, 10–22, 17–16, 19–18
Pts: Sottana 13; Rebs: Gorini 5 Asts: Dotto, Gatti 4		Pts: Lyttle 19; Rebs: Lyttle 13; Asts: Domínguez 4

Complexe sportif du Kercado, Vannes
Attendance: 1,300
Referees: Jasmina Juras (SRB), Fabiana Martinescu (ROU), Ilona Kucerova (CZE)

16 June 2013
21:00

Boxscore

Russia	57–68	Sweden
Scoring by quarter: 18–14, 16–18, 7–19, 16–17
Pts: Prince 16; Rebs: Grishaeva 8 Asts: Belyakova, Prince 3		Pts: Key 14; Rebs: Halvarsson 10; Asts: Four players 3

Complexe sportif du Kercado, Vannes
Attendance: 1,226
Referees: Ingus Baumanis (LAT), Carole Delauné (FRA), Aliaksandr Syrytsa (BLR)

17 June 2013
18:30

Boxscore

Russia	72–66	Italy
Scoring by quarter: 20–11, 15–19, 12–16, 25–20
Pts: Kuzina 15; Rebs: Prince 8 Asts: three players 3		Pts: Sottana 21; Rebs: Masciadri, Ress 5 Asts: Sottana 3

Complexe sportif du Kercado, Vannes
Attendance: 1,700
Referees: Ingus Baumanis (LAT), Tomislav Hordov (CRO), Fabiana Martinescu (ROU)

17 June 2013
21:00

Boxscore

Sweden	49–73	Spain
Scoring by quarter: 16–12, 14–18, 10–19, 9–24
Pts: F. Eldebrink 10; Rebs: Barthold 7 Asts: F. Eldebrink, Barthold 2		Pts: Lyttle 17; Rebs: Lyttle 14; Asts: Palau 5

Complexe sportif du Kercado, Vannes
Attendance: 1,186
Referees: Aleksandar Glisic (SRB), Nicolas Maestre (FRA), Maka Kupatadze (GEO)

=== Group C ===
Team	Pld	W	L	PF	PA	PD	Pts
France	3	3	0	217	118	+99	6
Great Britain	3	2	1	192	203	−11	5
Serbia	3	1	2	162	208	−46	4
Latvia	3	0	3	151	193	−42	3

15 June 2013
12:30

Boxscore

Serbia	68–76	Great Britain
Scoring by quarter: 13–18, 25–23, 21–11, 9–24
Pts: Milovanović 19; Rebs: Ajanović 7 Asts: Radočaj 3		Pts: Stewart, Gandy 13; Rebs: Leedham 10; Asts: four players 4

Arena Loire, Trélazé
Attendance: 4,100
Referees: Borys Shulga (UKR), Aare Halliko (EST), Karolina Andersson (FIN)

15 June 2013
21:00

Boxscore

Latvia	39–62	France
Scoring by quarter: 7–15, 7–18, 19–17, 6–12
Pts: Babkina 11; Rebs: three players 4 Asts: Brumermane 2		Pts: Yacoubou 17; Rebs: Gruda 6 Asts: Dumerc 3

Arena Loire, Trélazé
Attendance: 5,300
Referees: Ognjen Jokic (MNE), Moritz Reiter (GER), Ilya Putenko (RUS)

16 June 2013
15:00

Boxscore

Great Britain	69–56	Latvia
Scoring by quarter: 16–10, 16–14, 16–19, 21–13
Pts: Butler, Leedham 14; Rebs: Butler 9 Asts: Collins 4		Pts: Krastiņa 12; Rebs: Šteinberga 7 Asts: Babkina 4

Arena Loire, Trélazé
Attendance: 2,628
Referees: Emilio Perez (ESP), Asa Johansson (SWE), Piotr Pastusiak (POL)

16 June 2013
21:00

Boxscore

France	76–32	Serbia
Scoring by quarter: 20–8, 18–7, 17–10, 21–7
Pts: Skrela 14; Rebs: Yacoubou 8 Asts: Lawson-Wade 4		Pts: A. Dabović 15; Rebs: Radočaj, Krnjić 4 Asts: Radočaj, A. Dabović 2

Arena Loire, Trélazé
Attendance: 5,100
Referees: Saverio Lanzarini (ITA), Anna Cardus (ESP), Sérgio Silva (POR)

17 June 2013
15:00

Boxscore

Serbia	62–56	Latvia
Scoring by quarter: 20–14, 11–10, 12–12, 19–20
Pts: Milovanović 15; Rebs: Matić 8 Asts: Radočaj 3		Pts: Kārkliņa 17; Rebs: Kārkliņa, Šteinberga 8 Asts: Babkina 2

Arena Loire, Trélazé
Attendance: 2,014
Referees: Borys Shulga (UKR), Saverio Lanzarini (ITA), Özlem Yalman (TUR)

17 June 2013
21:00

Boxscore

France	79–47	Great Britain
Scoring by quarter: 22–16, 11–6, 23–17, 23–8
Pts: Yacoubou, Ayayi 11; Rebs: Yacoubou, Gruda 9 Asts: Lawson-Wade, Dumerc 4		Pts: Leedham 13; Rebs: Butler, Allen 8 Asts: four players 2

Arena Loire, Trélazé
Attendance: 5,400
Referees: Aare Halliko (EST), Piotr Pastusiak (POL), Zdenko Zubak (SVK)

=== Group D ===
Team	Pld	W	L	PF	PA	PD	Pts
Belarus	3	2	1	184	154	+30	5
Czech Republic	3	2	1	183	179	+4	5
Croatia	3	1	2	200	208	−8	4
Lithuania	3	1	2	200	226	−26	4

15 June 2013
15:00

Boxscore

Lithuania	77–89	Croatia
Scoring by quarter: 26–22, 19–21, 19–25, 13–21
Pts: Petronytė 23; Rebs: Petronytė 14; Asts: Visgaudaitė, Petronytė 4		Pts: Slišković 19; Rebs: Ivezić 8 Asts: Ciglar 6

Arena Loire, Trélazé
Attendance: 4,552
Referees: Saverio Lanzarini (ITA), Anna Cardus (ESP), Piotr Pastusiak (POL)

15 June 2013
18:30

Boxscore

Belarus	60–39	Czech Republic
Scoring by quarter: 21–5, 6–12, 12–12, 21–10
Pts: Leuchanka 14; Rebs: three players 8 Asts: Murauskaya, Likhtarovich 3		Pts: Zrůstová 14; Rebs: Kulichová 6 Asts: six players 1

Arena Loire, Trélazé
Attendance: 4,728
Referees: Emilio Perez (ESP), Sérgio Silva (POR), Özlem Yalman (TUR)

16 June 2013
12:30

Boxscore

Croatia	43–57	Belarus
Scoring by quarter: 13–15, 15–11, 7–18, 8–13
Pts: three players 8 Rebs: four players 4 Asts: Ivezić, Lelas 3		Pts: Leuchanka 13; Rebs: Leuchanka 12; Asts: Likhtarovich 4

Arena Loire, Trélazé
Attendance: 2,291
Referees: Aare Halliko (EST), Ognjen Jokic (MNE), Zdenko Zubak (SVK)

16 June 2013
18:30

Boxscore

Czech Republic	70–51	Lithuania
Scoring by quarter: 14–14, 25–8, 14–9, 17–20
Pts: Kulichová 15; Rebs: Kulichová 7 Asts: Bortelová 5		Pts: Petronytė 13; Rebs: Paugaitė 7 Asts: three players 2

Arena Loire, Trélazé
Attendance: 3,937
Referees: Borys Shulga (UKR), Karolina Andersson (FIN), Ilya Putenko (RUS)

17 June 2013
12:30

Boxscore

Lithuania	72–67	Belarus
Scoring by quarter: 15–14, 20–20, 16–21, 21–12
Pts: Gutkauskaitė 15; Rebs: Paugaitė 9 Asts: Petronytė 3		Pts: Tarasava 16; Rebs: Kress 7 Asts: Anufryienka 4

Arena Loire, Trélazé
Attendance: 1,311
Referees: Anna Cardus (ESP), Ognjen Jokic (MNE), Asa Johansson (SWE)

17 June 2013
18:30

Boxscore

Czech Republic	74–68	Croatia
Scoring by quarter: 24–20, 13–12, 21–14, 16–22
Pts: Hindraková 17; Rebs: Kulichová 10; Asts: Bortelová 5		Pts: Lelas, Slišković 13; Rebs: Ivezić, Slišković 7 Asts: Ciglar 5

Arena Loire, Trélazé
Attendance: 5,000
Referees: Emilio Perez (ESP), Moritz Reiter (GER), Sérgio Silva (POR)

== Main round ==
=== Group E ===
Team	Pld	W	L	PF	PA	PD	Pts
Spain	5	5	0	351	250	+101	10
Turkey	5	4	1	318	263	+55	9
Italy	5	3	2	293	307	−14	8
Sweden	5	2	3	307	339	−32	7
Montenegro	5	1	4	302	330	−28	6
Slovakia	5	0	5	274	356	−82	5

20 June 2013
14:00

Boxscore

Slovakia	44–80	Spain
Scoring by quarter: 9–22, 13–22, 10–16, 12–20
Pts: Lukačovičová 11; Rebs: Tetemondová 7 Asts: Baburová, Vynuchalova 2		Pts: Lyttle 18; Rebs: three players 5 Asts: Xargay, Valdemoro 4

Palais des sports Saint-Sauveur, Lille
Attendance: 1,000
Referees: Ingus Baumanis (LAT), Fabiana Martinescu (ROU), Gintaras Vitkauskas (LTU)

20 June 2013
16:30

Boxscore

Sweden	69–58	Montenegro
Scoring by quarter: 22–15, 16–16, 10–13, 21–14
Pts: F. Eldebrink 21; Rebs: Barthold 8 Asts: E. Eldebrink 5		Pts: Dubljević 17; Rebs: Perovanović 14; Asts: Škerović 3

Palais des sports Saint-Sauveur, Lille
Attendance: 502
Referees: Aleksandar Glisic (SRB), Ilona Kucerova (CZE), Maka Kupatadze (GEO)

20 June 2013
20:00

Boxscore

Italy	46–66	Turkey
Scoring by quarter: 16–20, 13–14, 2–17, 15–15
Pts: Sottana 11; Rebs: Cinili, Formica 5 Asts: Masciadri, Zanoni 2		Pts: Dalgalar 10; Rebs: Çağlar 12; Asts: Palazoğlu, Alben 4

Palais des sports Saint-Sauveur, Lille
Attendance: 1,250
Referees: Nicolas Maestre (FRA), Antonis Demetriou (CYP), Tomislav Hordov (CRO)

22 June 2013
14:00

Boxscore

Italy	58–47	Slovakia
Scoring by quarter: 12–10, 8–10, 20–9, 18–18
Pts: Sottana 22; Rebs: Ress 9 Asts: Gatti 4		Pts: Kupčíková 12; Rebs: Kupčíková 9 Asts: Sujová 4

Palais des sports Saint-Sauveur, Lille
Attendance: 1,200
Referees: Jasmina Juras (SRB), Ilona Kucerova (CZE), Maka Kupatadze (GEO)

22 June 2013
16:30

Boxscore

Turkey	72–51	Sweden
Scoring by quarter: 17–16, 14–10, 24–11, 17–14
Pts: Alben 15; Rebs: Çağlar 7 Asts: Vardarlı 5		Pts: F. Eldebrink 15; Rebs: E. Eldebrink 8 Asts: E. Eldebrink 6

Palais des sports Saint-Sauveur, Lille
Attendance: 1,021
Referees: Haydn Jones (WAL), Ingus Baumanis (LAT), Gintaras Vitkauskas (LTU)

22 June 2013
20:00

Boxscore

Montenegro	50–66	Spain
Scoring by quarter: 10–18, 17–16, 11–17, 12–15
Pts: Perovanović 19; Rebs: DeForge 6 Asts: Dubljević 5		Pts: Lyttle 21; Rebs: Lyttle 11; Asts: Palau 6

Palais des sports Saint-Sauveur, Lille
Attendance: 1,650
Referees: Carole Delauné (FRA), Nikolaos Somos (GRE), Tomislav Hordov (CRO)

24 June 2013
14:00

Boxscore

Montenegro	60–66	Italy
Scoring by quarter: 22–23, 23–11, 9–22, 6–10
Pts: Dubljević 20; Rebs: Dubljević 14; Asts: Dubljević 4		Pts: Masciadri 15; Rebs: Ress 12; Asts: Sottana 6

Palais des sports Saint-Sauveur, Lille
Attendance: 1,100
Referees: Haydn Jones (WAL), Nikolaos Somos (GRE), Antonis Demetriou (CYP)

24 June 2013
16:30

Boxscore

Sweden	75–72	Slovakia
Scoring by quarter: 24–11, 22–25, 9–14, 20–22
Pts: Egnell, F. Eldebrink 17; Rebs: Barthold 7 Asts: F. Eldebrink 4		Pts: Kupčíková 15; Rebs: Vynuchalova 10; Asts: Kubatová, Kupčíková 3

Palais des sports Saint-Sauveur, Lille
Attendance: 1,402
Referees: Jasmina Juras (SRB), Aliaksandr Syrytsa (BLR), Tomislav Hordov (CRO)

24 June 2013
20:00

Boxscore

Spain	61–48	Turkey
Scoring by quarter: 15–10, 17–7, 11–21, 18–10
Pts: Lyttle 18; Rebs: Lyttle 13; Asts: Dominguez 3		Pts: four players 8 Rebs: Vardarlı, Hollingsworth 8 Asts: Vardarlı 4

Palais des sports Saint-Sauveur, Lille
Attendance: 1,650
Referees: Aleksandar Glisic (SRB), Nicolas Maestre (FRA), Fabiana Martinescu (ROU)

=== Group F ===
Team	Pld	W	L	PF	PA	PD	Pts
France	5	5	0	355	248	+107	10
Serbia	5	3	2	306	323	−17	8
Belarus	5	3	2	286	255	+31	8
Czech Republic	5	2	3	287	322	−35	7
Great Britain	5	2	3	324	363	−39	7
Croatia	5	0	5	324	371	−47	5

19 June 2013
14:00

Boxscore

Czech Republic	66–55	Great Britain
Scoring by quarter: 17–13, 15–10, 15–13, 19–19
Pts: Zrůstová 20; Rebs: Burgrová 9 Asts: Bortelová 5		Pts: Leedham 20; Rebs: Leedham, Stewart 8 Asts: Leedham 6

Vendéspace, Mouilleron-le-Captif
Attendance: 2,000
Referees: Saverio Lanzarini (ITA), Moritz Reiter (GER), Ilya Putenko (RUS)

19 June 2013
16:30

Boxscore

Serbia	54–48	Belarus
Scoring by quarter: 14–9, 10–10, 19–13, 11–16
Pts: M. Dabović, A. Dabović 13; Rebs: Matić 5 Asts: A. Dabović 5		Pts: Verameyenka 12; Rebs: Leuchanka 16; Asts: Verameyenka 3

Vendéspace, Mouilleron-le-Captif
Attendance: 2,000
Referees: Emilio Perez (ESP), Aare Halliko (EST), Karolina Andersson (FIN)

19 June 2013
20:00

Boxscore

Croatia	70–78	France
Scoring by quarter: 10–23, 9–20, 30–22, 21–13
Pts: Lelas 18; Rebs: Lelas 9 Asts: Ivezić, Mišura 3		Pts: Lawson-Wade 12; Rebs: Gruda 8 Asts: Lawson-Wade, Dumerc 3

Vendéspace, Mouilleron-le-Captif
Attendance: 4,100
Referees: Borys Shulga (UKR), Anna Cardus (ESP), Özlem Yalman (TUR)

21 June 2013
14:00

Boxscore

Croatia	64–77	Serbia
Scoring by quarter: 12–23, 21–21, 18–18, 13–15
Pts: Vrsaljko 14; Rebs: Lelas 9 Asts: Jelavić 5		Pts: Milovanović 19; Rebs: Rad 9 Asts: M. Dabović 5

Vendéspace, Mouilleron-le-Captif
Attendance: 2,100
Referees: Emilio Perez (ESP), Moritz Reiter (GER), Zdenko Zubak (SVK)

21 June 2013
16:30

Boxscore

Great Britain	61–71	Belarus
Scoring by quarter: 15–15, 13–19, 18–9, 15–28
Pts: Leedham 16; Rebs: Handy, Leedham 6 Asts: Butler 4		Pts: Snytsina 15; Rebs: Leuchanka 13; Asts: Verameyenka 3

Vendéspace, Mouilleron-le-Captif
Attendance: 2,100
Referees: Sérgio Silva (POR), Ognjen Jokic (MNE), Özlem Yalman (TUR)

21 June 2013
20:00

Boxscore

France	64–49	Czech Republic
Scoring by quarter: 17–12, 17–11, 14–11, 16–15
Pts: Gruda 21; Rebs: Yacoubou, Gruda 10; Asts: Dumerc 4		Pts: Kulichová 10; Rebs: Burgrová 8 Asts: Bartoňová 5

Vendéspace, Mouilleron-le-Captif
Attendance: 4,000
Referees: Borys Shulga (UKR), Piotr Pastusiak (POL), Asa Johansson (SWE)

23 June 2013
14:00

Boxscore

Czech Republic	59–75	Serbia
Scoring by quarter: 11–15, 4–21, 15–13, 29–26
Pts: Zrůstová 15; Rebs: Kulichová 8 Asts: three players 3		Pts: M. Dabović 17; Rebs: Milovanović 8 Asts: A. Dabović 5

Vendéspace, Mouilleron-le-Captif
Attendance: 2,500
Referees: Anna Cardus (ESP), Sérgio Silva (POR), Ilya Putenko (RUS)

23 June 2013
16:30

Boxscore

Great Britain	85–79	Croatia
Scoring by quarter: 19–13, 25–21, 20–20, 21–25
Pts: Leedham 26; Rebs: Leedham 9 Asts: Leedham 10		Pts: Lelas 17; Rebs: Lelas 15; Asts: Lelas 5

Vendéspace, Mouilleron-le-Captif
Attendance: 2,500
Referees: Saverio Lanzarini (ITA), Ognjen Jokic (MNE), Asa Johansson (SWE)

23 June 2013
20:00

Boxscore

Belarus	50–58	France
Scoring by quarter: 7–12, 13–14, 14–19, 16–13
Pts: Snytsina 16; Rebs: Likhtarovich 7 Asts: Snytsina 4		Pts: Gruda 18; Rebs: Dumerc, Ndongue 5 Asts: Lawson-Wade, Gomis 4

Vendéspace, Mouilleron-le-Captif
Attendance: 4,000
Referees: Aare Halliko (EST), Karolina Andersson (FIN), Zdenko Zubak (SVK)

== Knockout stage ==
=== Bracket ===
Quarter-finals
June 26
Spain	75
Czech Republic	58
June 26
Serbia	85
Italy	79
June 27
Turkey	55
Belarus	41
June 27
France	87
Sweden	83

Semi-finals
June 28
Spain	88
Serbia	69
June 28
Turkey	49
France	57

Final
June 30
Spain	70
France	69
Third place
June 30
Serbia	71
Turkey	92

5th–8th place bracket

Semi-finals
June 27
Czech Republic	72
Italy	68
June 28
Belarus	69
Sweden	48

Fifth place
June 29
Czech Republic	50
Belarus	64
Seventh place
June 29
Italy	60
Sweden	77

=== Quarterfinals ===
26 June 2013
17:00

Boxscore

Serbia	85–79	Italy
Scoring by quarter: 23–26, 15–16, 26–23, 21–14
Pts: Milovanović 21; Rebs: Rad, Milovanović 7 Asts: A. Dabović 3		Pts: Sottana 22; Rebs: Ress 7 Asts: Gatti, Dotto 5

Pévèle Arena, Orchies
Attendance: 1,440
Referees: Haydn Jones (WAL), Carole Delauné (FRA), Moritz Reiter (GER)

26 June 2013
20:00

Boxscore

Spain	75–58	Czech Republic
Scoring by quarter: 25–15, 16–20, 13–11, 21–12
Pts: Torrens 29; Rebs: Lyttle 12; Asts: Xargay 6		Pts: Elhotová 13; Rebs: Kulichová 10; Asts: Bortelová 6

Pévèle Arena, Orchies
Attendance: 2,502
Referees: Ingus Baumanis (LAT), Fabiana Martinescu (ROU), Aare Halliko (EST)

27 June 2013
17:00

Boxscore

Turkey	55–41	Belarus
Scoring by quarter: 14–10, 17–8, 10–15, 14–8
Pts: İvegin 13; Rebs: Hollingsworth 9 Asts: Vardarlı 4		Pts: Snytsina 12; Rebs: Verameyenka, Leuchanka 11; Asts: four players 2

Pévèle Arena, Orchies
Attendance: 2,802
Referees: Emilio Perez (ESP), Saverio Lanzarini (ITA), Sérgio Silva (POR)

27 June 2013
20:00

Boxscore

France	87–83	Sweden
Scoring by quarter: 21–22, 17–17, 26–24, 23–20
Pts: Dumerc 16; Rebs: three players 3 Asts: Lawson-Wade 6		Pts: F. Eldebrink 21; Rebs: Egnell, Barthold 6 Asts: E. Eldebrink 7

Pévèle Arena, Orchies
Attendance: 5,000
Referees: Anna Cardus (ESP), Jasmina Juras (SRB), Ilona Kucerova (CZE)

=== 5th–8th place semifinals ===
27 June 2013
14:00

Boxscore

Czech Republic	72–68	Italy
Scoring by quarter: 24–13, 15–21, 13–13, 20–21
Pts: Elhotová 18; Rebs: Burgrová 8 Asts: Hindraková 5		Pts: Sottana 16; Rebs: three players 6 Asts: Sottana 3

Pévèle Arena, Orchies
Attendance: 500
Referees: Aleksandar Glisic (SRB), Ognjen Jokic (MNE), Maka Kupatadze (GEO)

28 June 2013
14:00

Boxscore

Belarus	69–48	Sweden
Scoring by quarter: 20–16, 11–8, 16–13, 22–11
Pts: Anufryienka 17; Rebs: Verameyenka 9 Asts: Likhtarovich 5		Pts: F. Eldebrink, E. Eldebrink 11; Rebs: F. Eldebrink 8 Asts: E. Eldebrink 5

Pévèle Arena, Orchies
Attendance: 1,102
Referees: Aleksandar Glisic (SRB), Saverio Lanzarini (ITA), Özlem Yalman (TUR)

=== Semifinals ===
28 June 2013
17:00

Boxscore

Spain	88–69	Serbia
Scoring by quarter: 19–7, 29–21, 21–14, 19–27
Pts: Lyttle 22; Rebs: Lyttle 11; Asts: Ouviña 4		Pts: Butulija, Rad 15; Rebs: Ajanović 7 Asts: Radočaj 7

Pévèle Arena, Orchies
Attendance: 4,500
Referees: Aare Halliko (EST), Moritz Reiter (GER), Ilona Kucerova (CZE)

28 June 2013
20:00

Boxscore

Turkey	49–57	France
Scoring by quarter: 11–22, 12–9, 17–18, 9–8
Pts: Tunçluer 20; Rebs: Vardarlı, Yılmaz 7 Asts: Alben, İvegin 3		Pts: Gomis 11; Rebs: Miyem, Gruda 9 Asts: Gruda 6

Pévèle Arena, Orchies
Attendance: 5,000
Referees: Ingus Baumanis (LAT), Ognjen Jokic (MNE), Fabiana Martinescu (ROU)

=== Seventh place game ===
29 June 2013
17:00

Boxscore

Italy	60–77	Sweden
Scoring by quarter: 13–24, 25–21, 13–19, 9–13
Pts: Zanoni 11; Rebs: Masciadri 10; Asts: Ress, Gatti 2		Pts: Egnell 15; Rebs: Egnell 10; Asts: E. Eldebrink, F. Eldebrink 6

Pévèle Arena, Orchies
Attendance: 2,550
Referees: Carole Delauné (FRA), Ilona Kucerova (CZE), Özlem Yalman (TUR)

=== Fifth place game ===
29 June 2013
20:00

Boxscore

Czech Republic	50–64	Belarus
Scoring by quarter: 12–20, 7–15, 17–15, 14–14
Pts: Zrůstová 13; Rebs: Hejdová, Hindraková 4 Asts: Bartoňová 4		Pts: Leuchanka 18; Rebs: Verameyenka 9 Asts: Leuchanka 5

Pévèle Arena, Orchies
Attendance: 2,302
Referees: Aare Halliko (EST), Haydn Jones (WAL), Ognjen Jokic (MNE)

=== Third place game ===
30 June 2013
17:00

Boxscore

Serbia	71–92	Turkey
Scoring by quarter: 24–21, 20–22, 12–23, 15–26
Pts: Milovanović 23; Rebs: Krnjić 7 Asts: Radočaj 5		Pts: Yılmaz 19; Rebs: Hollingsworth 16; Asts: Vardarlı 5

Pévèle Arena, Orchies
Attendance: 5,002
Referees: Anna Cardus (ESP), Sérgio Silva (POR), Maka Kupatadze (GEO)

=== Final ===
30 June 2013
20:00

Boxscore

Spain	70–69	France
Scoring by quarter: 21–12, 15–23, 17–20, 17–14
Pts: Torrens 21; Rebs: Lyttle 11; Asts: Torrens 4		Pts: Gruda 25; Rebs: Miyem 7 Asts: Gomis 4

Pévèle Arena, Orchies
Attendance: 5,500
Referees: Ingus Baumanis (LAT), Jasmina Juras (SRB), Fabiana Martinescu (ROU)

== Statistical leaders ==
Points

Name	PPG
(Spain) Sancho Lyttle	18.4
(Montenegro) Jelena Dubljević	17.7
(United Kingdom) Jo Leedham	16.8
(Spain) Alba Torrens	16.2
(Sweden) Frida Eldebrink	15.7

Rebounds

Name	RPG
(Spain) Sancho Lyttle	11.1
(Belarus) Yelena Leuchanka	8.9
(Turkey) Quanitra Hollingsworth	7.6
(Italy) Kathrin Ress	7.6
(Montenegro) Jelena Dubljević	7.5

Assists

Name	APG
(United Kingdom) Jo Leedham	4.5
(Turkey) Birsel Vardarlı	4.2
(Sweden) Elin Eldebrink	4.1
(Montenegro) Jelena Škerović	3.5
(Turkey) Işıl Alben	3.4
(Czech Republic) Veronika Bortelová	3.4
(Spain) Laia Palau	3.4

Blocks

Name	BPG
(Belarus) Anastasiya Verameyenka	2.2
(Czech Republic) Petra Kulichová	2.0
(Italy) Kathrin Ress	1.4
(Spain) Sancho Lyttle	1.3
(Slovakia) Anna Jurčenková	1.0

Steals

Name	SPG
(Spain) Sancho Lyttle	2.9
(Turkey) Işıl Alben	1.9
(Slovakia) Dominika Baburová	1.8
(Montenegro) Anna DeForge	1.8
(Slovakia) Lucia Kupčíková	1.8

== All-star team ==
Guard	Center	Forward
(France) Céline Dumerc (Sweden) Frida Eldebrink	(Spain) Sancho Lyttle	(Spain) Alba Torrens (France) Isabelle Yacoubou

== Final ranking ==
Pos	Team	Pld	W	L	PF	PA	PD	Pts
1st place, gold medalist(s)	Spain	9	9	0	661	518	+143	18
2nd place, silver medalist(s)	France	9	8	1	630	489	+141	16
3rd place, bronze medalist(s)	Turkey	9	7	2	592	484	+108	14
4	Serbia	9	5	4	593	636	−43	10
5	Belarus	9	5	4	527	480	+47	10
6	Czech Republic	9	4	5	537	580	−43	8
7	Sweden	9	4	5	583	612	−29	8
8	Italy	9	3	6	566	613	−47	6
9	Great Britain	6	3	3	391	419	−28	6
10	Montenegro	6	2	4	374	390	−16	4
11	Croatia	6	1	5	413	448	−35	2
12	Slovakia	6	1	5	349	424	−75	2
13	Russia	3	1	2	201	211	−10	2
14	Lithuania	3	1	2	200	226	−26	2
15	Latvia	3	0	3	151	193	−42	0
16	Ukraine	3	0	3	180	225	−45	0

Teams are qualified for the 2014 FIBA World Championship for Women & EuroBasket Women 2015
