= Kupec =

Kupec is a Czech and Slovak surname meaning "merchant". Notable people with the surname include:

- C. J. Kupec (born 1953), American basketball player.
- Martin Kupec (born 1988), Czech ice hockey player.

== See also ==
- Kupčík
