= Monika Bosilj =

Croatian basketball player

Personal information
- Born: December 23, 1985 (age 40) Mostar, SFR Yugoslavia
- Listed height: 1.78 m (5 ft 10 in)

Career information
- WNBA draft: 2010: undrafted
- Playing career: –2016
- Position: Small forward

Career history
- Ragusa Dubrovnik
- 2010–2011: Athlete Celje
- 2011–2012: Mladi Krajišnik
- 2012–2013: Gospić
- 2013: Novi Zagreb
- 2014: Rockwool Pula
- 2014–2016: Kvarner

Monika Bosilj (born 23 December 1985) is a Croatian female professional basketball player. Bosilj played basketball at Florida International University until 2010. She represented Croatia at the 2013 EuroBasket.

In 2018, Bosilj returned to education at Durham University, where she played a season for the Durham Palatinates.
