= 2013 Eurobasket squads =

2013 Eurobasket squads may refer to:

- FIBA EuroBasket 2013 squads
- EuroBasket Women 2013 squads
