= Kristina Benić =

Croatian basketball player

Personal information
- Born: 4 June 1988 (age 38) Dubrovnik, SFR Yugoslavia
- Listed height: 1.86 m (6 ft 1 in)

Career information
- WNBA draft: 2010: undrafted
- Position: Power forward

Career history
- 2006–2007: Jolly JBS
- 2008–2010: Ragusa Dubrovnik
- 2012–2013: Jolly JBS
- 2013: Novi Zagreb
- 2014–2015: Ragusa Dubrovnik
- 2015–2016: CUS Cagliari
- 2016: Nottingham Wildcats
- 2017: La Spezia
- 2017–present: Basket Team Crema

Kristina Benić (born 4 June 1988 in Dubrovnik, SFR Yugoslavia) is a Croatian female professional basketball player, who played for clubs in Croatia, England and Italy. She was also part of the Croatia women's national basketball team which played in the EuroBasket Women 2013.

== Career ==
She played the 2006–07 season for Jolly JBS, winning the Croatian League and participating in the EuroCup Women that season. She played the 2008–09 EuroCup Women with Ragusa Dubrovnik. In 2010-11 she played the EuroCup Women with Novi Zagreb. In 2012 she is back at Šibenik Jolly and played 24 matches in the national championship, before moving in 2013 for another spell at Novi Zagreb. In March 2015 she played the final of the Croatian Cup with Ragusa Dubrovnik

In 2015 she sign with Italian club CUS Cagliari to play in the Serie A1. In 2016 she moved to England to play in the British League for the Nottingham Wildcats. In January 2017, she left England and returned to Italy where she signed with Cestistica Spezzina.

Ahead of the 2017–18 season, she sign with Basket Team Crema from Serie A2. She helped the team to win the Serie A2 Cup and is elected the Most Valuable Player in the finals.

== Awards ==
- 2006–07 Croatian First Women's Basketball League champion with ŽKK Šibenik.
