= Rasa Žemantauskaitė =

Lithuanian basketball player

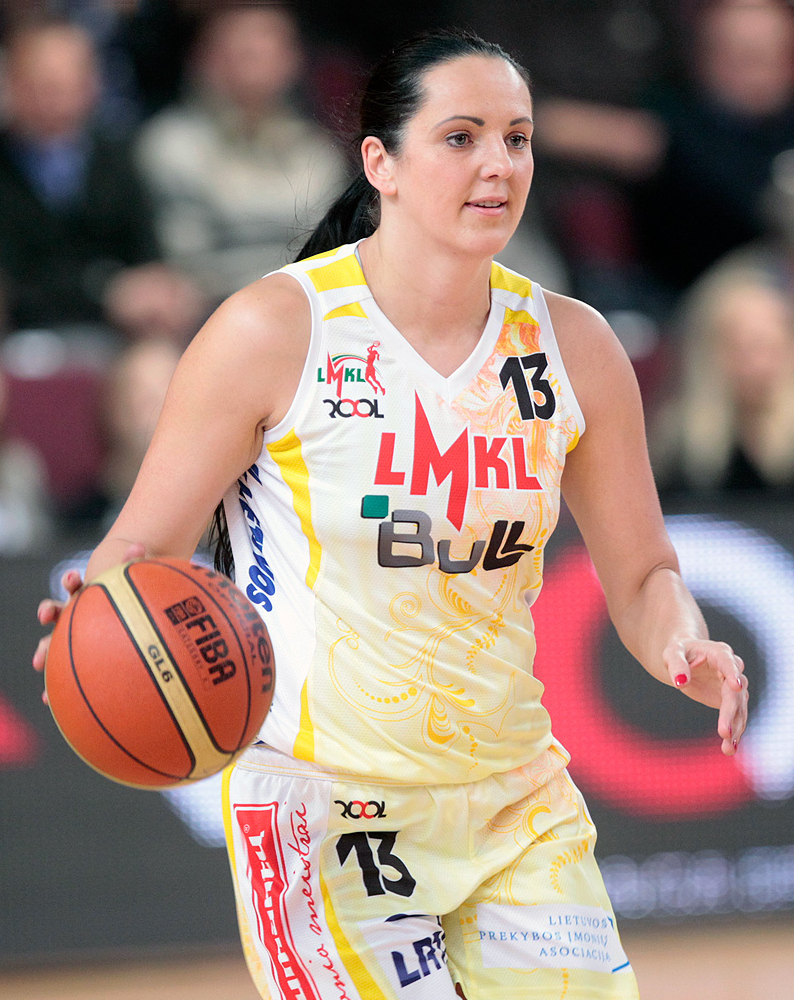
- Žemantauskaitė in 2015

Personal information
- Born: 11 January 1981 (age 45) Kaunas, Lithuanian SSR, Soviet Union
- Height: 176 cm (5 ft 9 in)

Sport
- Sport: Basketball

Rasa Žemantauskaitė (born 11 January 1981) is a Lithuanian basketball point guard. She competed for Lithuania at the 2002 World Championships and 2003 and 2013 European championships.
