= Ana Semren =

Croatian basketball player

Personal information
- Born: 5 February 1988 (age 38) Zagreb, SFR Yugoslavia
- Listed height: 1.90 m (6 ft 3 in)
- Position: Center

Career history
- ?: Montmontaža
- ?: Medveščak
- ?: Jolly JBS
- 2014: Novi Zagreb

Ana Semren (born 5 February 1988) is a Croatian female professional basketball player.
