= Lisa Ann Karčić =

Croatian American basketball player

Personal information
- Born: November 11, 1986 (age 40) New York City, New York, United States
- Listed height: 1.86 m (6 ft 1 in)
- Listed weight: 81 kg (179 lb)

Career information
- High school: New Hyde Park
- College: Villanova University (2005–2009)
- WNBA draft: 2009: undrafted
- Playing career: 2009–2014
- Position: Power forward / center

Career history
- 2009–2010: AEL Limassol
- 2010: Leones Ponce
- 2010–2011: Keravan
- 2011: Keflavík
- 2011–2012: Zamarat
- 2012–2013: Hondarribia-Irun
- 2013–2014: Novi Zagreb

Career highlights
- Icelandic league champion (2011); Naisten Korisliiga steals leader (2011)

Lisa Ann Karčić (born November 11, 1986, in New York City) is a Croatian American former professional basketball player. She was a member of the Croatian national team and competed with the team at the 2012 Summer Olympics. In 2011, she won the Icelandic championship with Keflavík.

== Villanova statistics ==
Legend
GP	Games played	GS	Games started	MPG	Minutes per game
FG%	Field goal percentage	3P%	3-point field goal percentage	FT%	Free throw percentage
RPG	Rebounds per game	APG	Assists per game	SPG	Steals per game
BPG	Blocks per game	PPG	Points per game	**Bold**	Career high

Year	Team	GP	Points	FG%	3P%	FT%	RPG	APG	SPG	BPG	PPG
2005-06	Villanova	32	138	**42.9%**	37.5%	**81.8%**	2.9	0.6	0.6	0.3	4.3
2006-07	Villanova	29	328	37.0%	37.0%	77.0%	**6.1**	1.7	1.1	**1.3**	11.3
2007-08	Villanova	30	**365**	41.6%	**41.6%**	75.5%	4.9	**2.7**	**1.4**	1.1	**12.2**
2008-09	Villanova	**33**	216	31.0%	26.9%	77.1%	4.9	1.9	1.2	0.7	6.5
Career		124	1047	37.7%	35.5%	77.5%	4.7	1.7	1.1	0.8	8.4

== Club career ==
=== Nordic leagues ===
Karčić joined Naisten Korisliiga club Keravan Energia Team prior to the 2010–2011 season. Although the club finished last in the standings she enjoyed a fine season statistical wise. In her last regular season game in Finland, she just missed out on a quadruple double with 26 points, 23 rebounds, 10 steals and 9 assists. For the season she averaged 18.6 points, 12.1 rebounds, 5.5 steals, 3.3 assists and 1.8 blocks. She led the league in steals and came in third in rebounds, assists and blocks.

Shortly after the Finnish season ended, Karčić joined Icelandic Úrvalsdeild powerhouse Keflavík for the 2011 Icelandic playoffs after an injury to starter, and former Villanova Wildcats teammate, Jacquline Adamshick. Her first game was game 3 in Keflavík's semi-finals matchup against KR where Keflavík came out on top. Keflavík edged out KR with a victory in game 4 of the series and advanced to the finals against Njarðvík. On April 3, Karčić scored a buzzer beater to defeat Njarðvík in game 1 of the finals. For the game she had 15 points, 9 rebounds and 9 steals. Keflavík went on to win game 2 and 3, sweeping Njarðvík from the finals. In five playoffs games, Karčić averaged 11.0 points, 12.6 rebounds, 4.8 steals and 3.2 blocks.

=== Spain ===
Karčić spent two seasons in the Spanish Liga Femenina, playing for Zamarat in 2011–2012 and for Hondarribia-Irun 2012–2013.

== Croatian national basketball team ==
Although born in the United States, Karčić holds a Croatian passport. Her first games for the Croatian national team where at the EuroBasket Women 2011. Her best contribution was in the match against Latvia (best rebounder, 7 rebounds) and against Montenegro (8 rebounds). At the 2012 Summer Olympics, Karčić competed again for the national team in the women's basketball event.

== Career ==
- (United States) New Hyde Park High School (? - 2004)
- (United States) Villanova Wildcats (2005–2009)
- (Cyprus) AEL Limassol (2009–2010)
- (Puerto Rico) Leones Ponce (2010)
- (Finland) Keravan (2010–2011)
- (Iceland) Keflavík (2011)
- (Spain) Zamarat (2011–2012)
- (Spain) Hondarribia-Irun (2012–2013)
- (Croatia) ŽKK Novi Zagreb (2013–2014)

== Awards and achievements ==
- 1,897 points in high school career
- twice named Nassau player of the year
- three-time All-Long Island selection
- three-time All-State selection
- MVP of the state tournament when she led the Gladiators to the title
- best in three-point field goals in Villanova, two years in a row

=== Finland ===
- Naisten Korisliiga steals leader (2011)

=== Iceland ===
- Icelandic league champion (2011)

=== Spain ===
- Defensive player of the year (2012)
