= Kupčík =

Kupčík, female Kupčíková, is a Czech and Slovak surname meaning 'small merchant'.

- Ľuboš Kupčík (b. 1989), Slovak footballer
- Lucia Kupčíková (b. 1984), Slovak basketball player
