= Iva Ciglar =

Croatian basketball player

Iva Brkić (Ciglar)
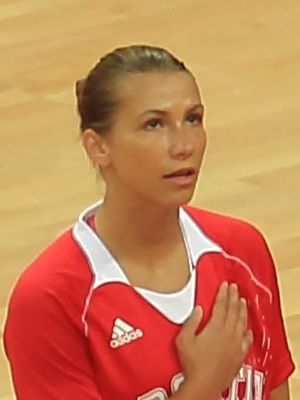
- Iva Ciglar at the 2012 Summer Olympics

No. 34 – Quesos el pastor
- Position: Point guard

Personal information
- Born: 12 December 1985 (age 40) Slavonski Brod, Croatia
- Listed height: 1.69 m (5 ft 7 in)

Career information
- WNBA draft: 2007: undrafted
- Playing career: 2001–present

Career history
- 2001–2004: Medveščak
- 2005–2008: Florida University
- 2008–2009: Merkur Celje
- 2009–2010: Szeged
- 2010–2011: Spartak St. Petersburg
- 2011–2012: UNI Győr
- 2012–2013: Perpignan
- 2013: Novi Zagreb
- 2013–2016: Sopron
- 2016-2019: IDK Guipúzcoa
- 2019-2019: CDB Clarinos
- 2019- present: Quesos el pastor
Medals
Women's basketball
Representing Croatia
Mediterranean Games
Bronze medal – third place	Pescara 2009	Team Event

Iva Brkić (born 12 December 1985) is a Croatian basketball player currently playing for Quesos el pastor, Spain as a point guard.

== Early years ==
Iva was born in the town of Slavonski Brod, Croatia to parents Željko and Melita Ciglar. Her father Željko is a basketball coach. She has two brothers.

Iva's career started in her native country of Croatia with ZKK Medvescak from 2001 to 2004. She later played three years in the NCAA while attending Florida International University from 2005 to 2008. She has also played for Slovenia's Merkur Celje from 2008 to 2009 where she was an "All Star of the Slovenian League" and Hungary's Szeviep Szeged from 2009 to 2010.

== Professional career ==
She is recovering about a very bad injury.

== Personal life ==
In May 2016 she married for Croatian journalist Filip Brkić. In November the same year is revealed that she was pregnant.
