= Trélazé =

- Commune
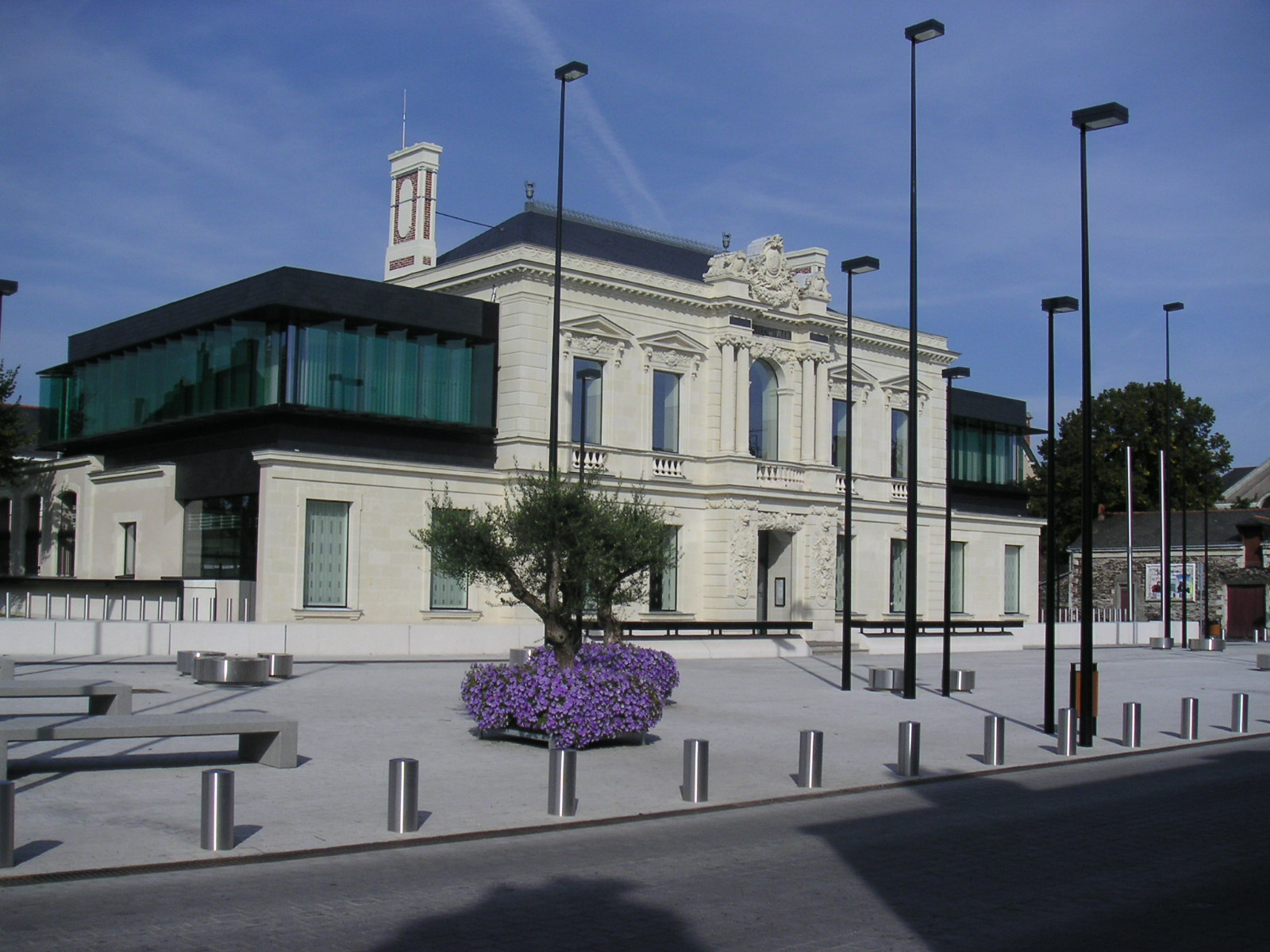
- The town hall of Trélazé
- Location of Trélazé
- Location within France Location within Pays de la Loire
- Coordinates: 47°26′46″N 0°27′54″W
- Country: France
- Region: Pays de la Loire
- Department: Maine-et-Loire
- Arrondissement: Angers
- Canton: Angers-7
- Intercommunality: CU Angers Loire Métropole

Government
  - Mayor (2022–2026): Lamine Naham
- Area^{1}: 12.2 km^{2} (4.7 sq mi)
- Elevation: 22 m (72 ft)
- Highest elevation: 45 m (148 ft)
- Lowest elevation: 0 m (0 ft)
- Population (2023): 16,333
  - Density: 1,340/km^{2} (3,470/sq mi)
- Time zone: UTC+01:00 (CET)
  - Summer (DST): UTC+02:00 (CEST)
- INSEE/Postal code: 49353 /49800
- ^{1} French Land Register data, which excludes lakes, ponds, glaciers > 1 km^{2} (0.386 sq mi or 247 acres) and river estuaries.

Trélazé (French pronunciation: [tʁelaze]) is a commune in the Maine-et-Loire department in western France.

== Population ==
Historical population
Year	Pop.	±% p.a.
1968	11,664	—
1975	11,250	−0.51%
1982	11,009	−0.31%
1990	10,539	−0.54%
1999	11,025	+0.50%
2007	12,030	+1.10%
2012	12,929	+1.45%
2017	14,658	+2.54%
2023	16,333	+1.82%
Source: INSEE

== See also ==
- Communes of the Maine-et-Loire department
