= Kristina Vengrytė =

Lithuanian basketball player (born 1981)

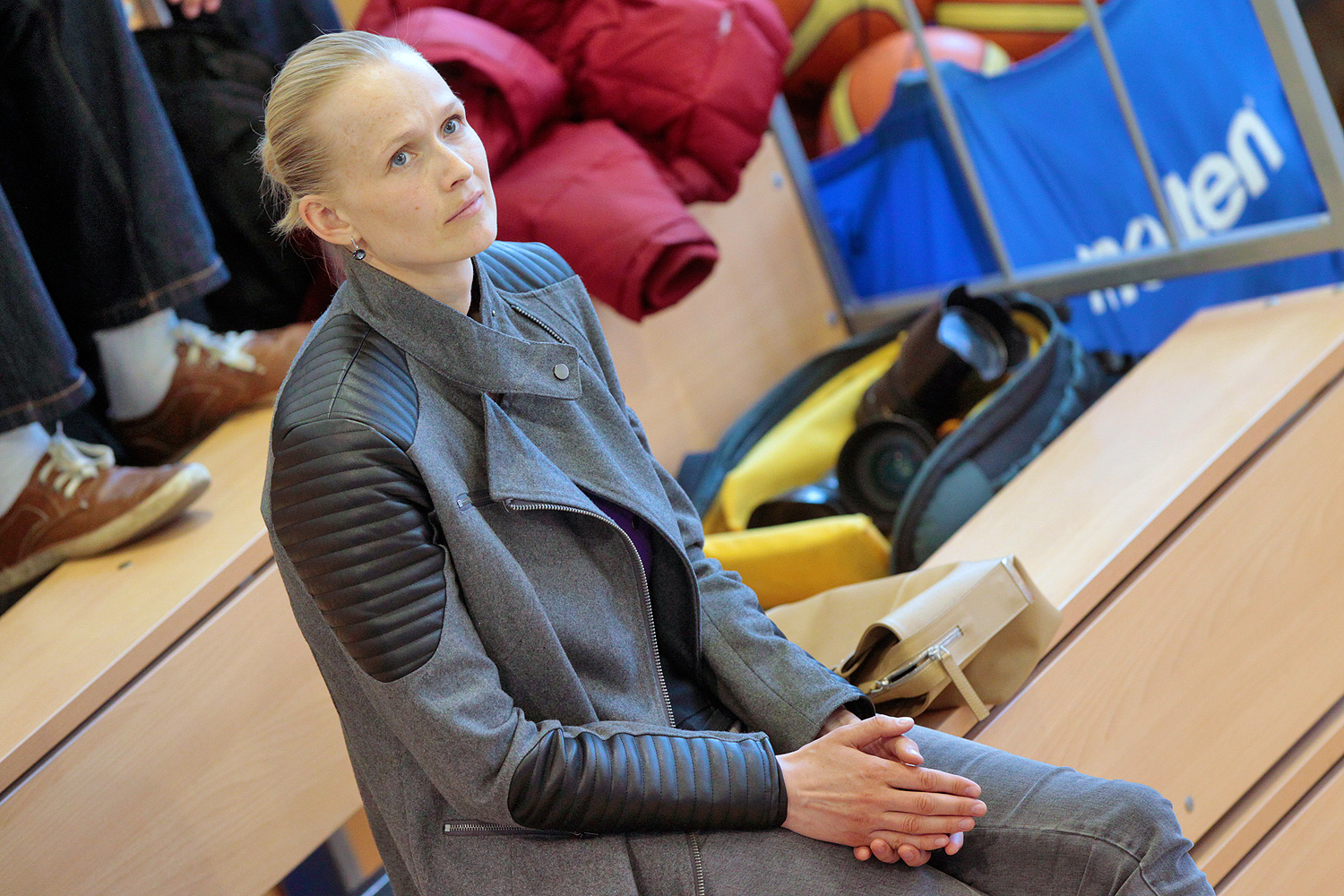

Personal information
- Born: 21 December 1981 (age 44) Vilnius, Lithuanian SSR, Soviet Union
- Listed height: 1.86 m (6 ft 1 in)
- Listed weight: 67 kg (148 lb)
- Position: SF

Kristina Vengrytė (born 21 December 1981 in Vilnius) is a Lithuanian women's basketball player who plays for the Kibirkstis Vilnius of the Lithuanian Women's Basketball League and is member of the Lithuanian national team. She is a 1.86 m (6 ft 1 in) tall SF.

Vengrytė has represented Lithuania at several Eurobasket Women (2007, 2013).
