= Nadezhda Grishaeva =

Russian basketball player (born 1989)

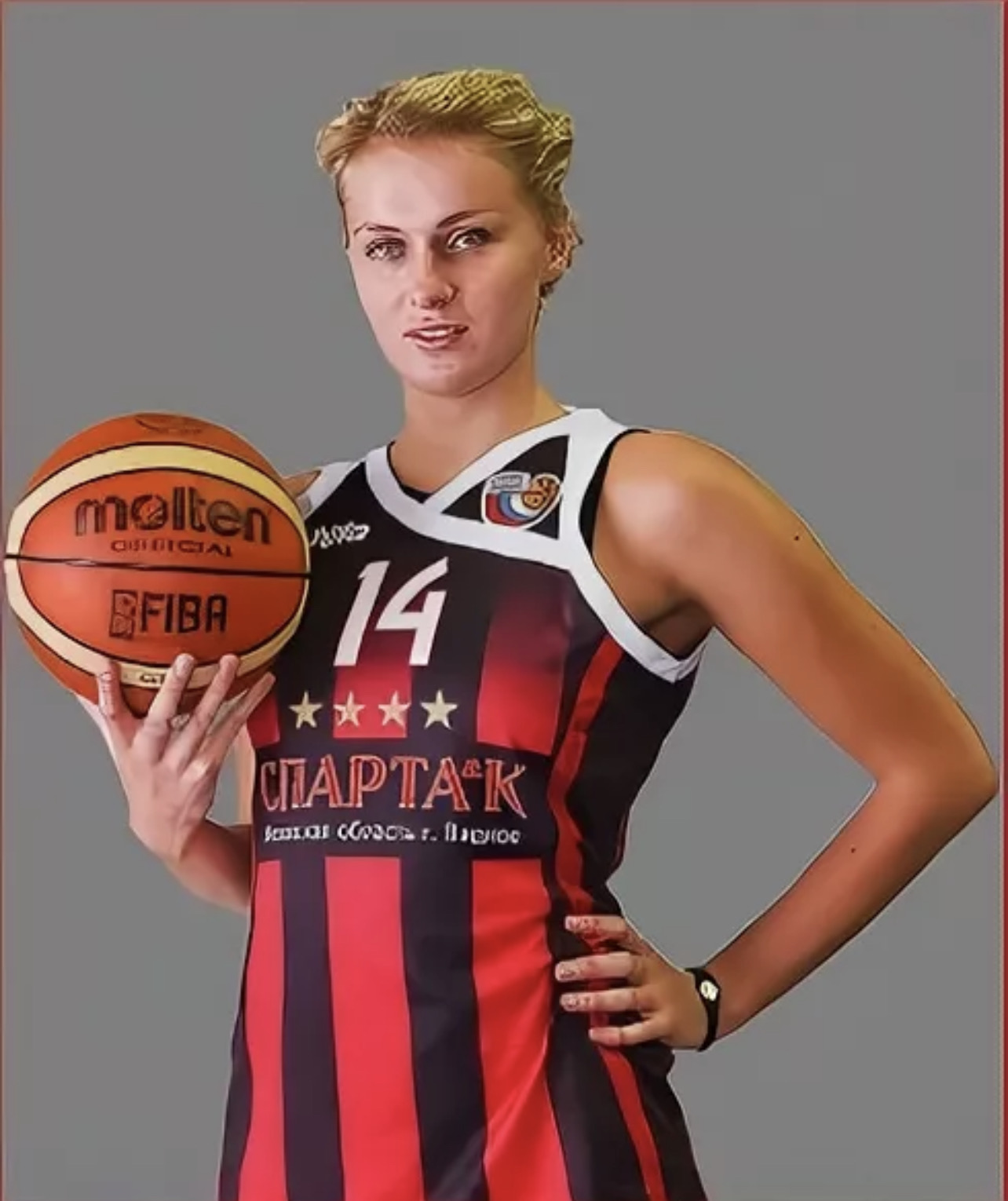

Ended her career
- Position: Power forward / Center

Personal information
- Born: 2 July 1989 (age 37) Leningrad, Soviet Union
- Listed height: 1.95 m (6 ft 5 in)
- Listed weight: 82 kg (181 lb)

Career information
- College: Faculty of Economics at Lomonosov Moscow State University (MSU)

Nadezhda Sergeyevna Grishayeva (Russian: Надежда Сергеевна Гришаева; born 2 July 1989 in Leningrad) is a Russian professional basketball player. She plays for Russia women's national basketball team. She competed in the 2012 Summer Olympics. She is 1.95 m (6 ft 5 in) tall.

== Career ==
Grishaeva began her professional basketball career in Russia where she played for various domestic teams between 2006 and 2011. In the 2011–12 season, she played for the French club Arras before returning to join Dynamo Moscow from 2012 to 2014, primarily as a power forward and center. In 2014, she sustained an injury that temporarily affected her playing career. She later joined the Turkish club Beşiktaş for the 2015–16 season before returning again to Dynamo Moscow in 2016. Internationally, she was a member of the Russian national team and competed in the 2012 Summer Olympics held in London.

After retiring from professional basketball, In 2016, Grishaeva reportedly pursued an economics degree in sports management. In May 2021, she established Anvil Fitness Club, a fitness center in Moscow.
