= Kim Butler (basketball) =

British professional basketball player

Personal information
- Born: 7 September 1982 (age 44)
- Listed height: 6 ft 2 in (1.88 m)
- Listed weight: 176 lb (80 kg)

Kimberly Butler (born 7 September 1982) is a British professional basketball player. She plays for Great Britain women's national basketball team and SK Cēsis from Latvia. She competed in the 2012 Summer Olympics.

== Santa Clara and Oregon State statistics ==
Legend
| GP | Games played | GS | Games started | MPG | Minutes per game |
| FG% | Field goal percentage | 3P% | 3-point field goal percentage | FT% | Free throw percentage |
| RPG | Rebounds per game | APG | Assists per game | SPG | Steals per game |
| BPG | Blocks per game | PPG | Points per game | **Bold** | Career high |

| Year | Team | GP | Points | FG% | 3P% | FT% | RPG | APG | SPG | BPG | PPG |
|---|---|---|---|---|---|---|---|---|---|---|---|
| 2001–02 | Santa Clara | 22 | 100 | 51.9% | 0.0% | 66.7% | 3.4 | 0.2 | 0.5 | 0.1 | 4.5 |
| 2002–03 | Santa Clara | 24 | 195 | **53.2%** | **50.0%** | 75.7% | 4.2 | 1.3 | 0.9 | 0.5 | 8.1 |
| 2003–04 | Oregon State | Sat out due to NCAA transfer rules | | | | | | | | | |
| 2004–05 | Oregon State | 29 | 294 | 45.3% | 29.6% | **81.3%** | 4.5 | 0.8 | 1.2 | **0.7** | 10.1 |
| 2005–06 | Oregon State | **31** | **576** | 50.2% | 21.4% | 76.9% | **5.3** | **1.6** | **1.5** | 0.3 | **18.6** |
| Career | | 106 | 1165 | 49.6% | 101.1% | 12.4% | 2.6 | 1.0 | 1.1 | 0.4 | 11.0 |
