= Natallia Anufryienka =

Belarusian basketball player (born 1985)

Horizont Minsk
- Position: Guard
- League: Belarusian League

Personal information
- Born: 11 June 1985 (age 41) Babruysk, Byelorussian SSR, Soviet Union
- Listed height: 5 ft 9 in (1.75 m)

Natallia Anufryienka (born 11 June 1985) is a Belarusian basketball player who competed in the 2008 Summer Olympics.
