= Michaela Zrůstová =

Czech basketball player

Personal information
- Nationality: Czech Republic
- Born: 4 April 1987 (age 39) Tábor, Czechoslovakia
- Height: 186 cm (6 ft 1 in)

Sport
- Sport: Basketball
- Club: ZVVZ USK Prague

Michaela Zrůstová (Czech pronunciation: [ˈmɪxaɛla ˈzruːstovaː]; born 4 April 1987) is a Czech female basketball player. At the 2012 Summer Olympics, she competed for the Czech Republic women's national basketball team in the women's event. She is 6 ft 1 inches tall.
