= Iva Slišković =

Croatian basketball player

Personal information
- Born: 4 September 1984 (age 42) Zagreb, SFR Yugoslavia
- Listed height: 1.91 m (6 ft 3 in)
- Listed weight: 76 kg (168 lb)

Career information
- Playing career: 2005–present
- Position: Center

Career history
- 2007–2008: Sopron
- 2008–2011: Celta Vigo
- 2011–2012: Rivas Ecópolis
- 2012: Trešnjevka 2009
- 2012–2013: CB Avenida
- 2013–2014: U.F. Angers
- 2014: SKBD Rucon
- 2014–2015: PF Schio
- 2015-present: Basket Landes
Medals
Women's basketball
Representing Croatia
Mediterranean Games
Bronze medal – third place	Pescara 2009	Team Event

Iva Slišković (born 4 September 1984) is a Croatian female basketball player. At the 2012 Summer Olympics, she competed for the Croatia women's national basketball team in the women's event. She is 6 feet 3 inches (1.91 m) tall.

== South Carolina statistics ==
Legend
GP	Games played	GS	Games started	MPG	Minutes per game
FG%	Field goal percentage	3P%	3-point field goal percentage	FT%	Free throw percentage
RPG	Rebounds per game	APG	Assists per game	SPG	Steals per game
BPG	Blocks per game	PPG	Points per game	**Bold**	Career high

Year	Team	GP	Points	FG%	3P%	FT%	RPG	APG	SPG	BPG	PPG
2003-04	South Carolina	28	**308**	**54.9%**	**50.0%**	69.3%	**7.1**	1.6	0.9	0.9	**11.0**
2004-05	South Carolina	29	193	45.7%	0.0%	69.2%	5.9	1.2	0.9	1.0	6.7
2005-06	South Carolina	29	231	49.1%		70.8%	5.6	**1.8**	**1.0**	**1.3**	8.0
2006-07	South Carolina	**33**	244	45.6%	0.0%	**71.0%**	4.7	1.5	0.9	0.6	7.4
Career	South Carolina	119	976	49.2%	14.3%	70.2%	5.8	1.5	0.9	1.0	8.2
