= Ana Lelas =

Croatian basketball player

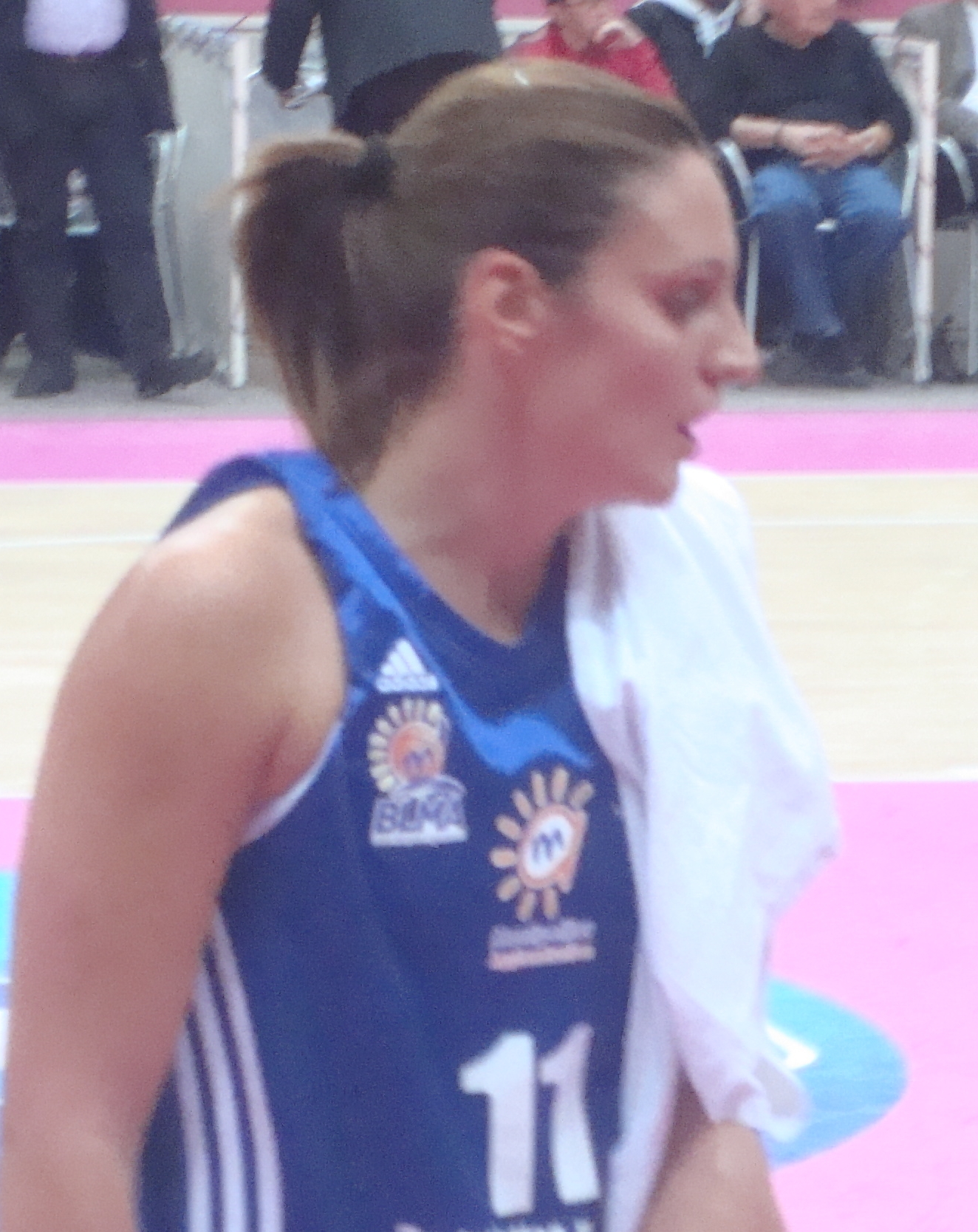

No. 11 – Trešnjevka 2009
- Position: Small forward
- League: First League of Croatia

Personal information
- Born: April 2, 1983 (age 43) Split, SFR Yugoslavia
- Listed height: 1.83 m (6 ft 0 in)
- Listed weight: 72 kg (159 lb)

Career information
- WNBA draft: 2005: undrafted
- Playing career: 2002–present

Career history
- 2002–2003: Šibenik Jolly JBS
- 2003–2004: Tarbes
- 2004–2005: Aix
- 2005–2006: Celta Vigo
- 2006–2008: Mourenx
- 2008–2010: Bourges
- 2010–2013: Basket Lattes
- 2013–2014: Mersin BB
- 2014–2015: Osmaniye Genclik
- 2015: CB Avenida
- 2016: Uniqa Sopron
- 2016–present: Trešnjevka 2009
Medals
Women's basketball
Representing Croatia
Mediterranean Games
Gold medal – first place	2001 Tunis	Team

Ana Lelas (born 2 April 1983) is a Croatian professional basketball player. She plays for the national team of Croatia and Trešnjevka 2009 of Croatia. She has represented the national team in several Eurobasket Women competitions and represented the country at the 2012 Summer Olympics.
