= Romana Vyňuchalová =

Slovak basketball player

No. 15 – ŠBK Šamorín
- Position: Center
- League: SBE

Personal information
- Born: 3 September 1986 (age 40) Bratislava, Slovakia
- Listed height: 6 ft 5 in (1.96 m)

Romana Vyňuchalová (born 3 September 1986) is a Slovak basketball player for ŠBK Šamorín and the Slovak national team.

She participated at the EuroBasket Women 2017.
