= Evgeniya Belyakova =

Russian basketball player (born 1986)

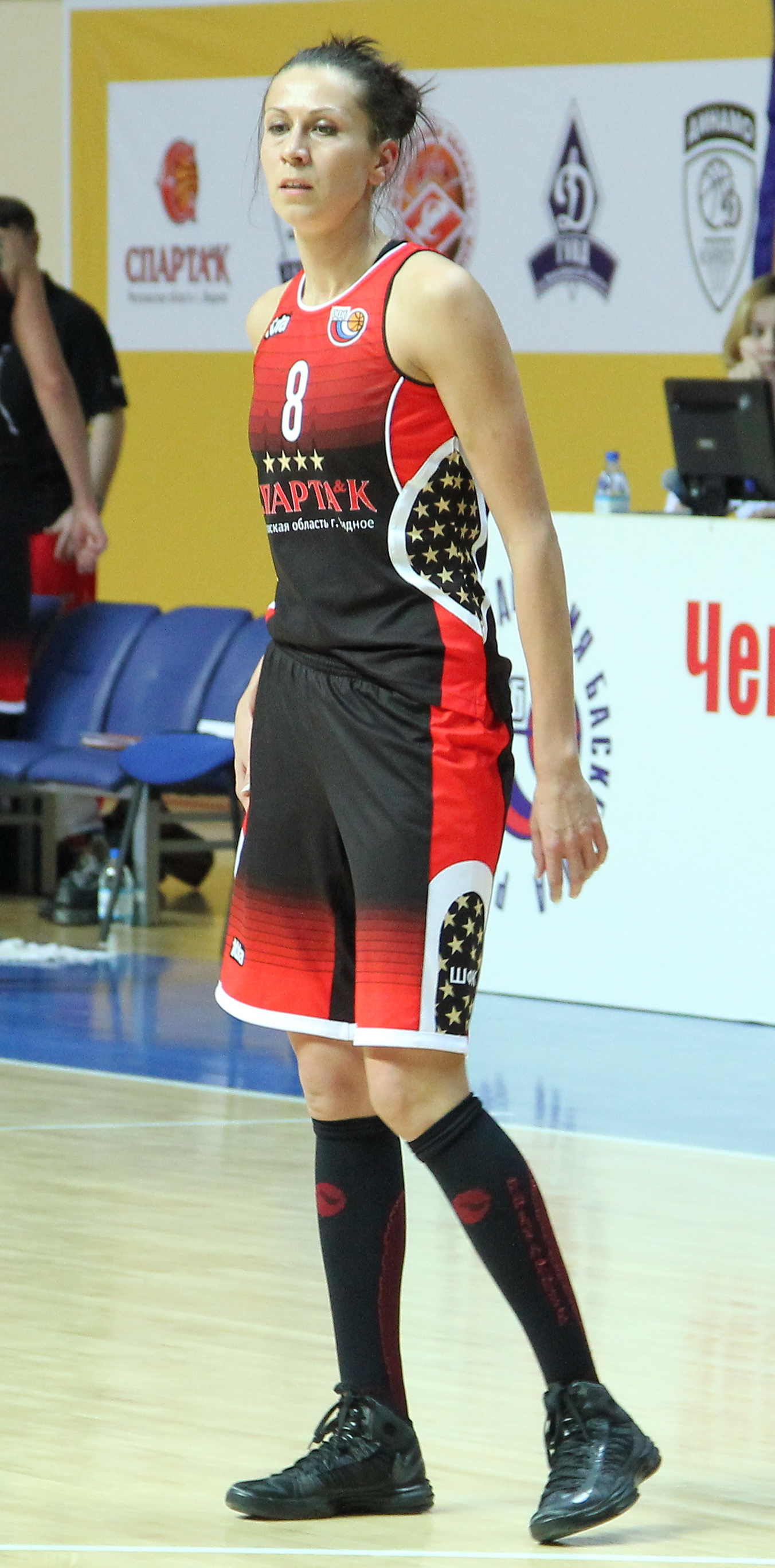

Personal information
- Born: 27 June 1986 (age 40) Leningrad, Soviet Union
- Listed height: 6 ft 0 in (1.83 m)
- Listed weight: 150 lb (68 kg)

Career information
- Playing career: 2004–2023
- Position: Forward

Career history
- 2004–2007: Baltiyskaya zvezda
- 2007–2009: Chevakata Vologda
- 2009–2011: Spartak St.Petersburg
- 2011–2014: Spartak Moscow
- 2014–2015: Dynamo Kursk
- 2015–2016: UMMC Ekaterinburg
- 2016: Los Angeles Sparks
- 2016–2023: UMMC Ekaterinburg

Career highlights
- WNBA champion (2016)
- Stats at WNBA.com
- Stats at Basketball Reference

Evgeniya Alexandrovna Belyakova (Russian: Евгения Александровна Белякова; born 27 June 1986) is a Russian professional basketball player. A professional since 2004, Belyakova plays for Russia women's national basketball team and competed in the 2012 Summer Olympics and three EuroBasket Women.

== Career statistics ==
Legend
GP	Games played	GS	Games started	MPG	Minutes per game	RPG	Rebounds per game
APG	Assists per game	SPG	Steals per game	BPG	Blocks per game	PPG	Points per game
TO	Turnovers per game	FG%	Field-goal percentage	3P%	3-point field-goal percentage	FT%	Free-throw percentage
**Bold**	Career best	°	League leader

=== WNBA ===
==== Regular season ====
Year	Team	GP	GS	MPG	FG%	3P%	FT%	RPG	APG	SPG	BPG	TO	PPG
2016	Los Angeles	21	0	11.3	29.6	17.9	43.8	0.7	0.7	0.6	—	0.4	2.1
Career	1 year, 1 team	21	0	11.3	29.6	17.9	43.8	0.7	0.7	0.6	—	0.4	2.1
Statistics retrieved from Sports Reference.

==== Playoffs ====
Year	Team	GP	GS	MPG	FG%	3P%	FT%	RPG	APG	SPG	BPG	TO	PPG
2016	Los Angeles	3	0	2.7	0.0	0.0	—	0.3	—	—	0.3	0.7	—
Career	1 year, 1 team	3	0	2.7	0.0	0.0	—	0.3	—	—	0.3	0.7	—
