= Kristīne Kārkliņa =

Latvian basketball player

TTT Rīga
- Position: Point guard
- League: LWBL

Personal information
- Born: 30 September 1983 (age 43) Riga, Latvia

Career information
- Playing career: 1998–present

Kristīne Kārkliņa (born 30 September 1983 in Riga) is a Latvian women's basketball player currently playing for TTT Riga and Latvia women's national basketball team. She joined TTT Riga in 2009. Previously she had played for SK Cēsis, as well as several other local and foreign clubs before 2000.

Niedola contributed to the successes of the team in EuroBasket 2009.

== Achievements ==
- 2009 – 9th place in Eurobasket Women with Latvia women's national basketball team.
