= Giorgia Sottana =

Italian basketball player

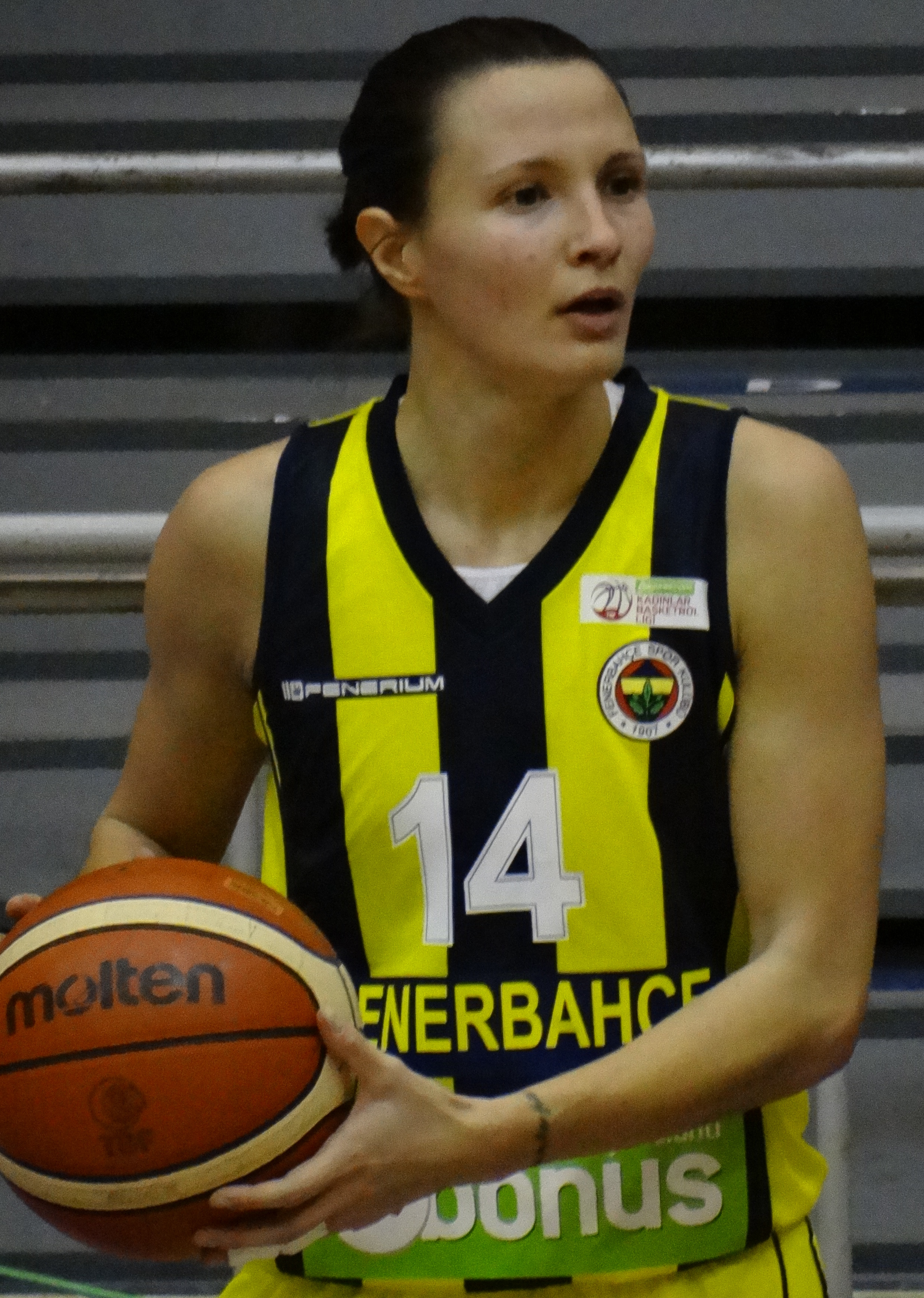

No. 14 – PF Schio
- Position: Point guard
- League: Lega Basket Femminile

Personal information
- Born: 15 December 1988 (age 37) Treviso, Italy
- Listed height: 5 ft 9 in (1.75 m)

Giorgia Sottana (born 15 December 1988) is an Italian basketball player for PF Schio and the Italian national team.

She participated at the EuroBasket Women 2017.

Sottana is married to Belgian basketball player Kim Mestdagh and they have a daughter together.
