= Jovana Rad =

Serbian basketball player

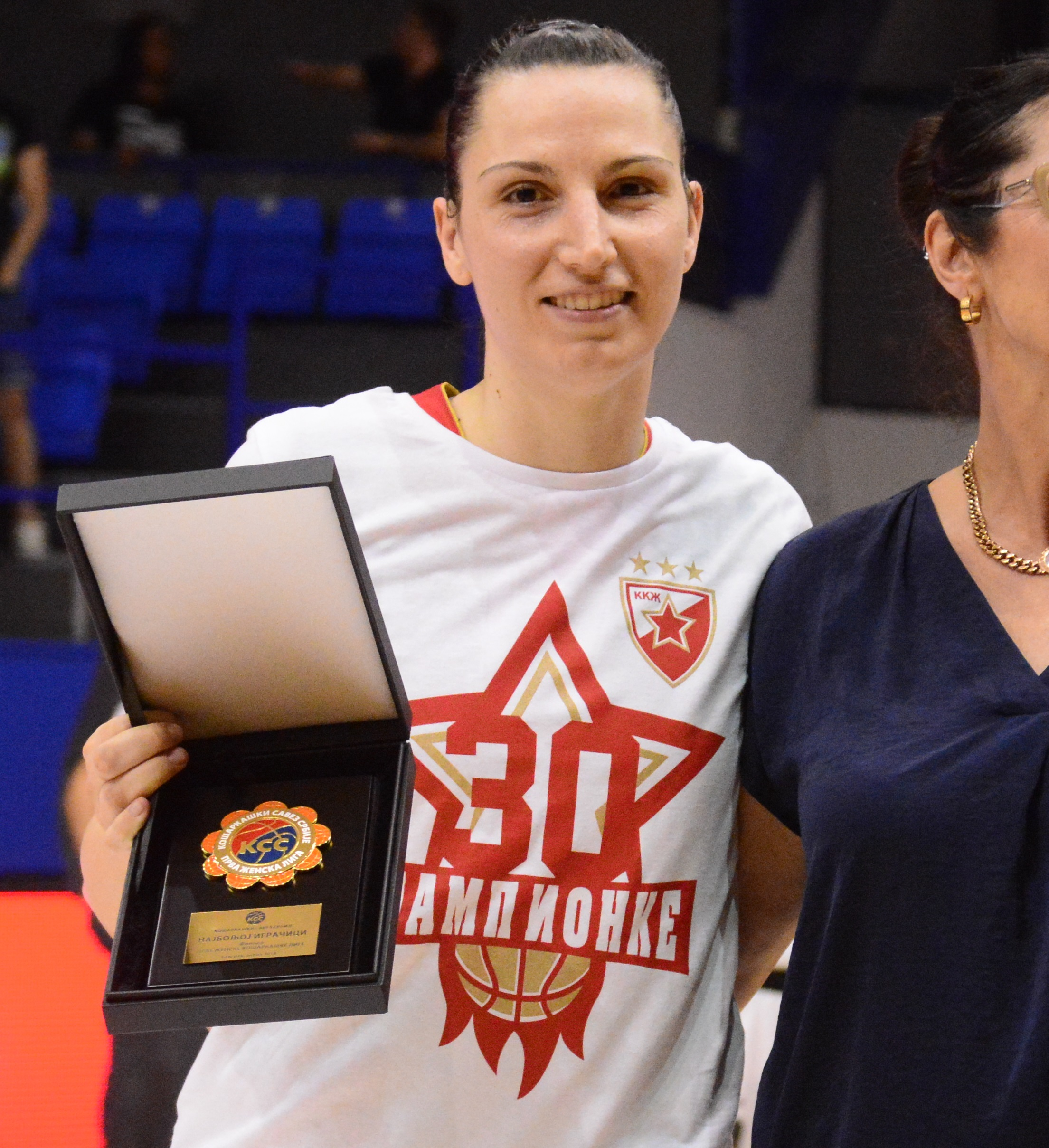

Flammes Carolo Basket
- Position: Power forward
- League: LFB

Personal information
- Born: May 8, 1987 (age 39) Novi Sad, SFR Yugoslavia
- Listed height: 6 ft 2 in (1.88 m)

Career information
- Playing career: 2005–present

Career history
- 2005–2008: Spartak Subotica
- 2008–2011: Hondarribia-Irún
- 2011–2012: UNB Obenasa
- 2012–2014: Tarbes Gespe Bigorre
- 2014–present: Flamens Carolo
Medals
Women's basketball
Representing Serbia
European U20 Championship
Silver medal – second place	2007 Bulgaria	Team

Jovana Rad (Serbian Cyrillic: Јована Рад; born May 8, 1987) is a Serbian professional basketball player. She plays as a power forward for the Serbian club Crvena zvezda.

Jovana is a member of the Serbia national basketball team.
