= Petra Kulichová =

Czech basketball player

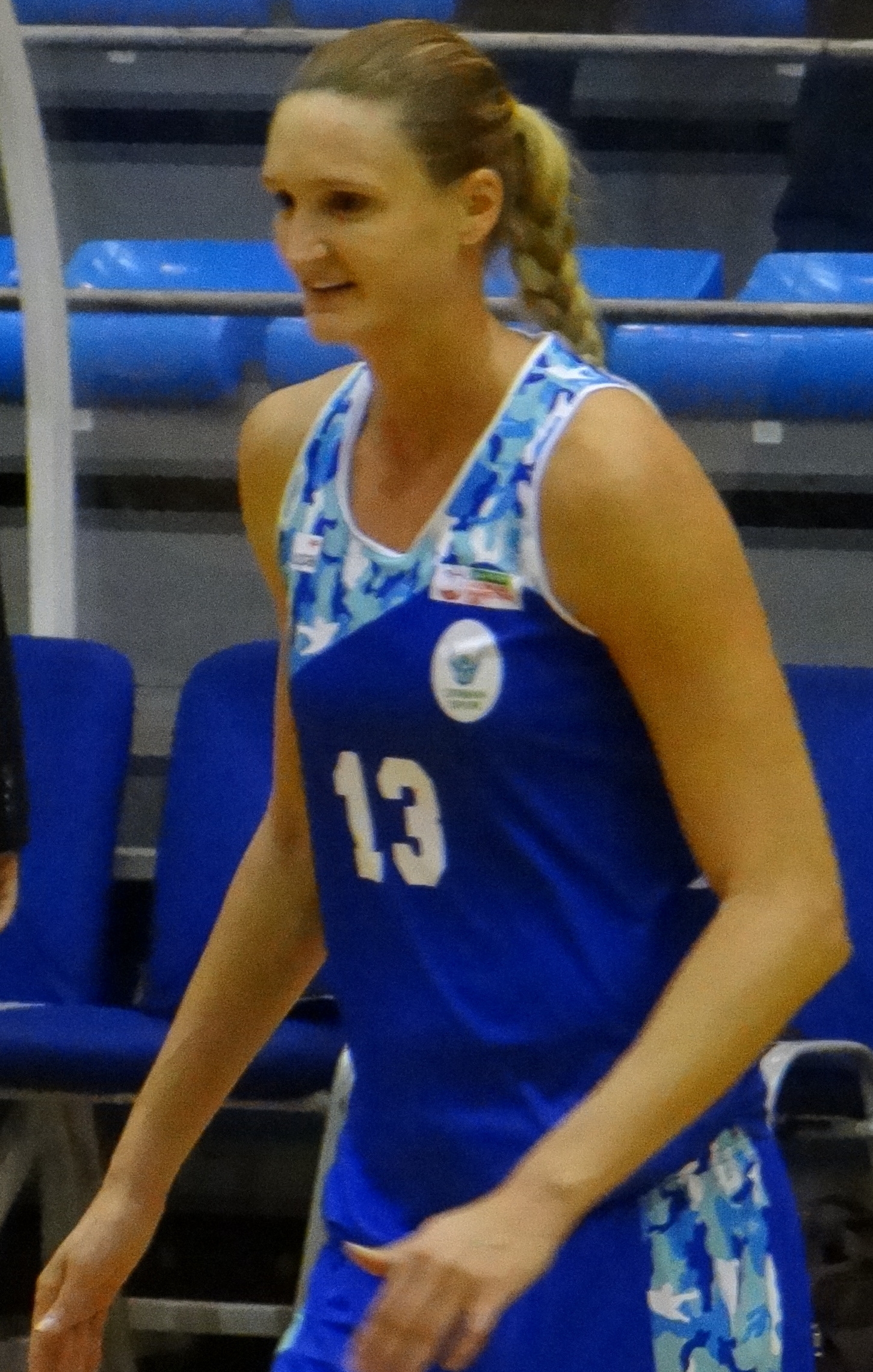

No. 13 – Botaş SK
- Position: Center
- League: TKBL

Personal information
- Born: 13 September 1984 (age 42) Pardubice, Czechoslovakia
- Listed height: 6 ft 6 in (1.98 m)
- Listed weight: 181 lb (82 kg)

Petra Kulichová (Czech pronunciation: [ˈpɛtra ˈkulɪxovaː]; born 13 September 1984) is a Czech basketball player who competed in the 2004 Summer Olympics, the 2008 Summer Olympics and the 2012 Summer Olympics.
