= Ines Ajanović =

Serbian basketball player (born 1980)

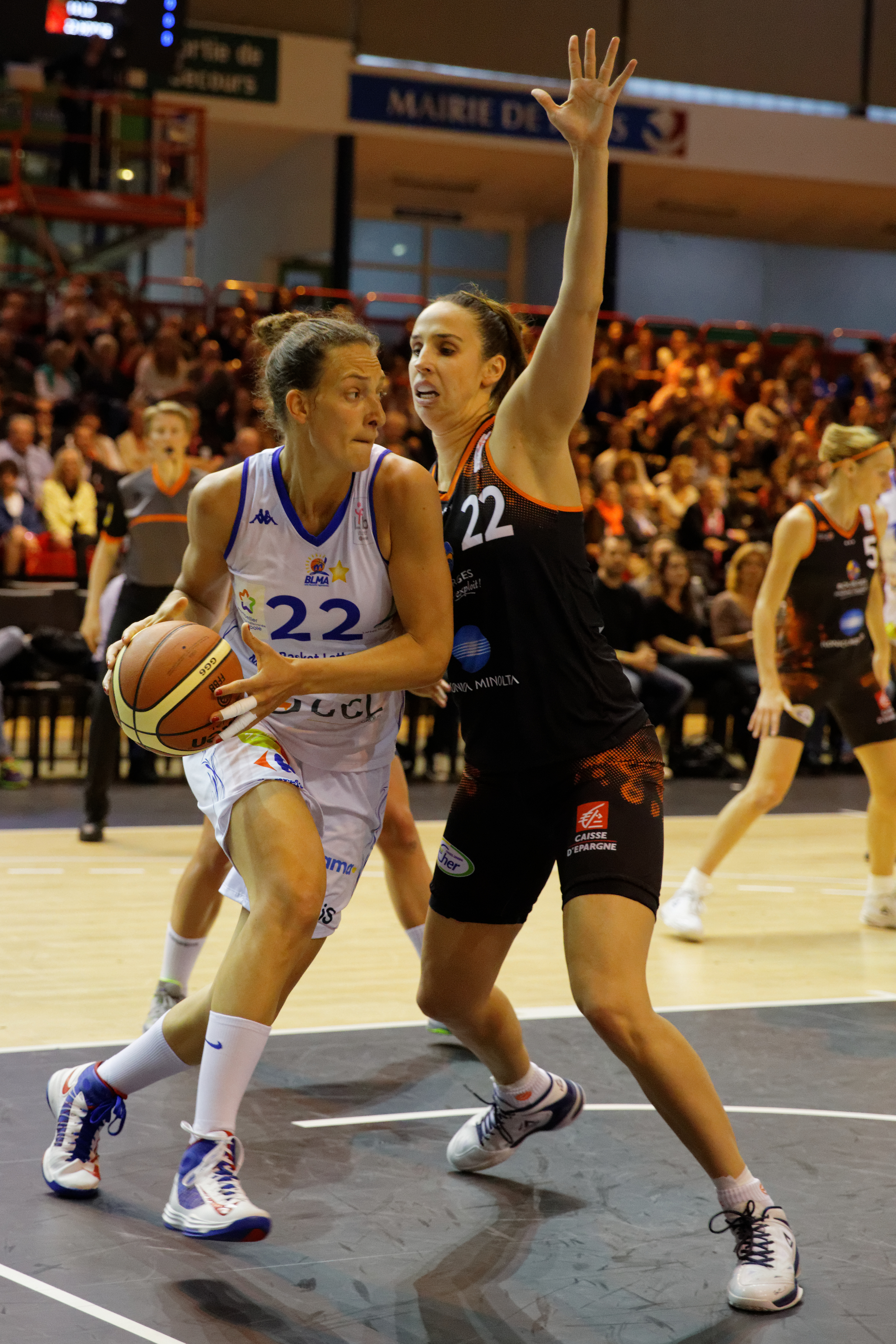

No. 33 – CAB Madeira
- Position: Power forward / center
- League: Liga Feminina de Basquetebol

Personal information
- Born: November 12, 1980 (age 46) Belgrade, SFR Yugoslavia
- Listed height: 1.96 m (6 ft 5 in)
- Listed weight: 85 kg (187 lb)

Career information
- College: South Carolina (1998–2002)
- WNBA draft: 2002: undrafted
- Playing career: 1996–present

Career history
- 1996–1997: Crvena zvezda
- 2002–2003: Crvena zvezda
- 2004–2005: Szeged KE
- 2005–2007: Gescom Viterbo
- 2007–2008: Saint-Amand
- 2008–2009: Club Atletico Faenza
- 2009: Crvena zvezda
- 2009–2010: Basket Parma
- 2010: Radivoj Korać
- 2010–2011: Basket Lattes
- 2011–2012: Lotos Gdynia
- 2012: ASDG Comense 1872
- 2012–2013: ASPTT Arras
- 2013: Radivoj Korać
- 2013: SK Cēsis
- 2014: Maranhao Basquete
- 2014–2015: Rivas Ecópolis
- 2015: Basket Lattes
- 2015–2016: Cluj Napoca
- 2016–present: CAB Madeira

Ines Ajanović (Serbian Cyrillic: Инес Ајановић; born November 12, 1980) is a Serbian professional basketball player.

== Professional career ==
Ines plays for CAB Madeira in the Portugal Basketball League. She is a former member of the Serbian national basketball team.
