= Jelena Dubljević =

Montenegrin basketball player (born 1987)

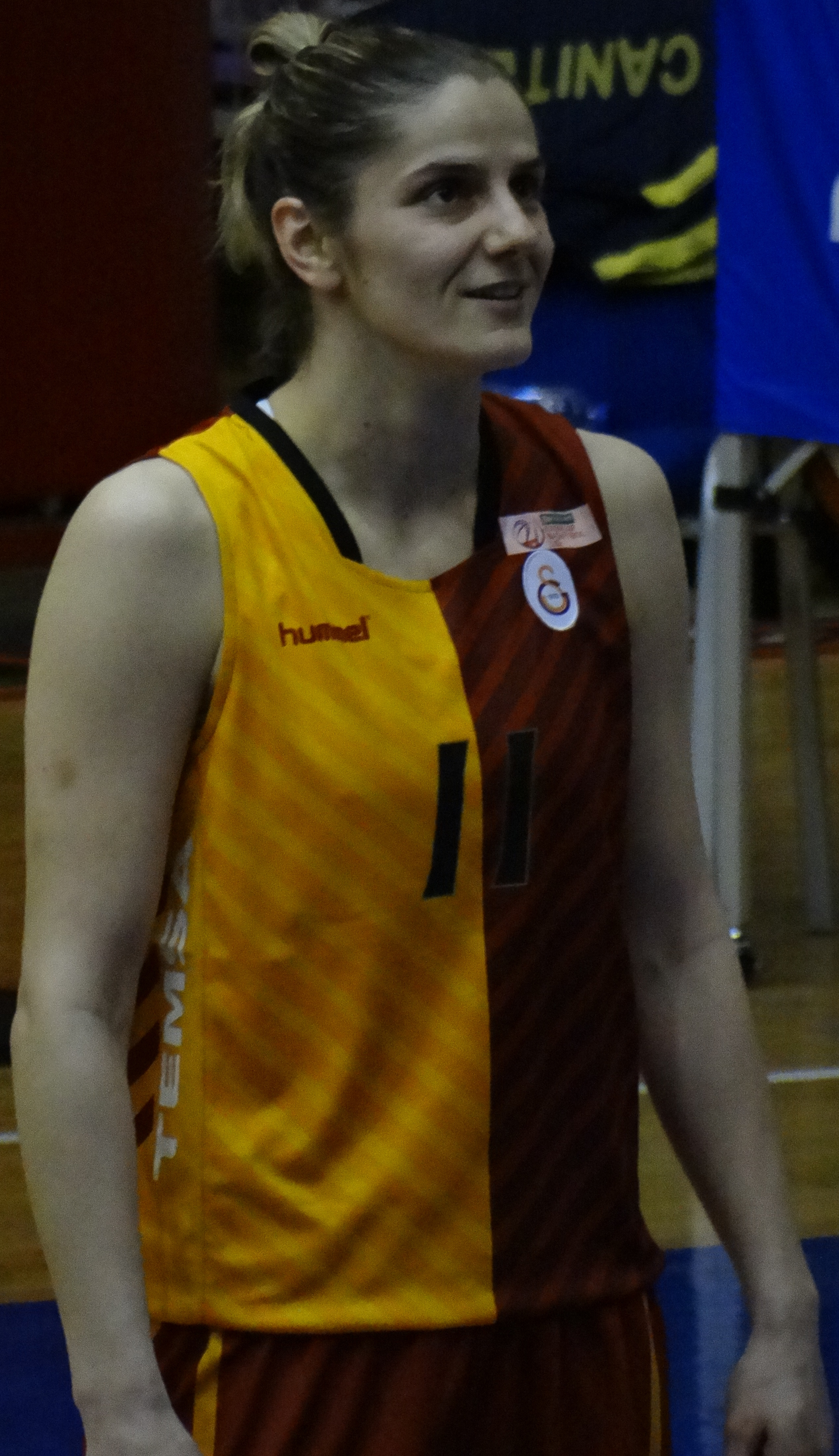

No. 37 – Botaş SK
- Position: Power forward
- League: Turkish Super League

Personal information
- Born: 7 May 1987 (age 39) Nikšić, SFR Yugoslavia
- Listed height: 6 ft 3 in (1.91 m)
- Listed weight: 179 lb (81 kg)

Career information
- Playing career: 2002–present

Career history
- 2002–2006: Budućnost Podgorica
- 2006: Ros Casares
- 2006–2010: Rivas
- 2010–2011: Tarbes GB
- 2011: Rivas
- 2012–2014: Nadezhda Orenburg
- 2014–2016: Galatasaray Odeabank
- 2016: Los Angeles Sparks
- 2016–2017: AGÜ Spor
- 2017–2018: Galatasaray
- 2018–2020: Shanghai Swordfish
- 2020–2021: Elazığ İl Özel İdarespor
- 2021–present: Botaş SK

Career highlights
- WNBA champion (2016)
- Stats at WNBA.com
- Stats at Basketball Reference
Medals
Women's basketball
Representing Serbia and Montenegro
World U19 Championship
Silver medal – second place	2005 Tunisia	Team
European U16 Championship
Gold medal – first place	2003 Turkey	Team

Jelena Dubljević (born May 7, 1987) is a Montenegrin professional basketball player who plays for Botaş SK and the Montenegrin national team. She competed in the 2011 Eurobasket tournament with Montenegro. In 2016, Dubljević signed with the Los Angeles Sparks. In her first WNBA season, she won her first WNBA championship with the Sparks after they defeated the Minnesota Lynx 3–2 in the Finals.

== Career statistics ==
=== WNBA ===
==== Regular season ====
Year	Team	GP	GS	MPG	FG%	3P%	FT%	RPG	APG	SPG	BPG	TO	PPG
2016	Los Angeles	15	0	5.3	40.9	33.3	100	0.9	0.5	0.1	0.1	0.5	1.5

==== Playoffs ====
Year	Team	GP	GS	MPG	FG%	3P%	FT%	RPG	APG	SPG	BPG	TO	PPG
2016	Los Angeles	2	0	3.0	50.0	--	--	0	0	0	0	0	1.0
