= Kathrin Ress =

Italian basketball player (born 1985)

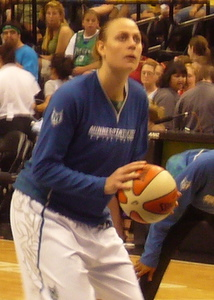

No. 22 – PF Schio
- Position: Forward
- League: LegA

Personal information
- Born: June 26, 1985 (age 41) Salorno, South Tyrol
- Listed height: 1.93 m (6 ft 4 in)
- Listed weight: 94 kg (208 lb)

Career information
- High school: Chantal Academy (Wheeling, West Virginia)
- College: Boston College (2003–2007)
- WNBA draft: 2007: 2nd round, 24th overall pick
- Drafted by: Minnesota Lynx

Career history
- 2007: Minnesota Lynx
- Stats at Basketball Reference

Kathrin Ress (born June 26, 1985) is an Italian professional basketball player, formerly of the WNBA, with the Minnesota Lynx.

== College career ==
Born in Salorno, South Tyrol, Ress attended college at Boston College and graduated in 2007. In her senior season at BC she averaged 16.4 ppg and 8.2 rpg. One of Ress' best performances came in front of her parents against Maryland where she put up 26 points against one of the best defenses in the country..

== Professional career ==
Following her collegiate career, she was selected 24th overall in the 2007 WNBA draft by the Minnesota Lynx. Ress played in 28 games for the Lynx in 2007, averaging 3.0 points and 2.5 rebounds per game before leaving the team to train with the Italian National Team on August 7.

== WNBA career statistics ==
Legend
GP	Games played	GS	Games started	MPG	Minutes per game	RPG	Rebounds per game
APG	Assists per game	SPG	Steals per game	BPG	Blocks per game	PPG	Points per game
TO	Turnovers per game	FG%	Field-goal percentage	3P%	3-point field-goal percentage	FT%	Free-throw percentage
**Bold**	Career best	°	League leader

=== Regular season ===
Year	Team	GP	GS	MPG	FG%	3P%	FT%	RPG	APG	SPG	BPG	TO	PPG
2007	Minnesota	28	1	12.4	.397	.500	.724	2.5	0.6	0.3	0.1	1.3	3.0
Career	1 year, 1 team	28	1	12.4	.397	.500	.724	2.5	0.6	0.3	0.1	1.3	3.0

== Personal ==
She is the sister of the professional basketball player Tomas Ress.

== Boston College statistics ==
Legend
GP	Games played	GS	Games started	MPG	Minutes per game
FG%	Field goal percentage	3P%	3-point field goal percentage	FT%	Free throw percentage
RPG	Rebounds per game	APG	Assists per game	SPG	Steals per game
BPG	Blocks per game	PPG	Points per game	**Bold**	Career high

Year	Team	GP	Points	FG%	3P%	FT%	RPG	APG	SPG	BPG	PPG
2003-04	Boston College	22	217	**58.7**	-	71.9	4.4	2.0	0.5	0.2	9.9
2004-05	Boston College	30	307	46.6	-	65.6	4.7	1.9	0.7	0.5	10.2
2005-06	Boston College	**33**	300	57.4	-	80.5	5.7	1.7	0.6	0.2	9.1
2006-07	Boston College	29	**476**	49.2	**31.3**	**82.4**	**8.2**	**2.5**	0.7	**0.8**	**16.4**
Career	Boston College	114	1300	51.6	31.3	76.2	5.8	2.0	0.6	0.4	11.4
