= Stephanie Gandy =

British-American basketball player

Newcastle Eagles
- Position: Small forward / power forward
- League: WBBL

Personal information
- Born: May 10, 1982 (age 44) Detroit, Michigan, U.S.
- Listed height: 1.78 m (5 ft 10 in)

Career information
- Playing career: 2000–present

Career history
- 2000–2004: University of Michigan
- ?: BC Lieshout
- 2009–2010: Dunav Ruse
- 2010–2011: CB Olesa Espanyol
- 2011–2018: Sheffield Hatters
- 2018–: Newcastle Eagles

Stephanie Gandy (born May 10, 1982) is a British-American former professional basketball player.

== Michigan statistics ==
Legend
GP	Games played	GS	Games started	MPG	Minutes per game
FG%	Field goal percentage	3P%	3-point field goal percentage	FT%	Free throw percentage
RPG	Rebounds per game	APG	Assists per game	SPG	Steals per game
BPG	Blocks per game	PPG	Points per game	**Bold**	Career high

Year	Team	GP	Points	FG%	3P%	FT%	RPG	APG	SPG	BPG	PPG
2000–01	Michigan	29	205	**47.0**	14.3	64.8	4.3	1.3	0.9	0.1	7.1
2001–02	Michigan	29	335	44.7	32.0	**78.3**	**4.7**	1.9	1.0	0.1	11.6
2002–03	Michigan	29	268	40.5	**34.5**	68.9	**4.7**	1.9	**1.4**	0.3	9.2
2003–04	Michigan	**31**	**361**	39.8	24.8	69.5	3.6	**2.0**	1.2	**0.6**	**11.6**
Career	Michigan	118	1169	42.4	28.2	71.3	4.3	1.8	1.1	0.3	9.9
