= Katsiaryna Snytsina =

Kazakhstan-born Belarusian basketball player (born in 1985)

- Snytsina in 2013

No. 6 – London Lions
- Position: Small forward
- League: Turkish Super League; EuroCup Women

Personal information
- Born: 2 September 1985 (age 41) Oskemen, Soviet Union (now Kazakhstan)
- Listed height: 6 ft 2 in (1.88 m)
- Listed weight: 168 lb (76 kg)

Career information
- Playing career: 1999–present

Career history
- 1999–2002: Horizont Minsk
- 2002–2003: Côte d'Opale Basket
- 2003–2006: Dynamo Moscow
- 2006–2007: Dynamo Novosibirsk
- 2007–2009: Arka Gdynia
- 2009–2012: Nadezhda Orenburg
- 2012: Horizont Minsk
- 2012–2013: Chevakata Vologda
- 2013–2014: Tarsus Belediyespor
- 2014: Basket Lattes
- 2014–2015: Diósgyőri VTK
- 2015: Canik Belediyespor
- 2015–2019: Hatay Büyükşehir Belediyespor
- 2019–2020: Beşiktaş
- 2020–2022: Nesibe Aydın
- 2022–present: London Lions

Katsiaryna Andrejeŭna Snytsina (Belarusian: Кацярына Андрэеўна Сныціна; Russian: Екатерина Андреевна Снытина; born 2 September 1985) is a Kazakhstani-born Belarusian basketball player. She is 6ft 2in tall. She was part of the Belarusian teams that won a bronze medal at the 2007 European Championships and placed sixth at the 2008 Summer Olympics.

Snytsina fled Belarus in 2020 and currently lives in exile as a dissident of the Alexander Lukashenko regime. In 2024, she starred as herself in the Belarus Free Theatre production KS6: Small Forward, which covers her life story, coming out as lesbian and becoming a dissident.
