= ŽKK Novi Zagreb =

ZKK Novi Zagreb
- Leagues: Croatian League
- Founded: 1978
- Arena: SD Trnsko
- Location: Novi Zagreb, Croatia
- Team colors: White and blue
- President: Vladimir Ivanković
- Head coach: Predrag Radenović
Home	Away

ŽKK Novi Zagreb is a Croatian women's basketball club based in Novi Zagreb neighborhood in the capital Zagreb established in 1978. In 2012 it was the runner-up in both the championship and the national cup, qualifying for the first time for the Euroleague.

== Honours ==
=== Domestic ===
National Championships – 1

- Croatian Women's Basketball League:
  - Winners (1): 2013
  - Runners-up (1): 2014

National Cups – 1

- Ružica Meglaj-Rimac Cup:
  - Winners (1): 2013

== Players ==
- (1.98) (Croatia) Luca Ivanković
- (1.86) (Croatia) Jelena Ivezić
- (1.83) (Croatia) Lisa Karčić
- (1.79) (Croatia) Antonija Jurić
- (1.80) (Croatia) Ivana Dojkić
- (1.82) (Slovenia) Eva Komplet
- (1.86) (Croatia) Tihana Stojsavljević
- (1.74) (Croatia) Iva Cigić
- (1.86) (Croatia) Kristina Benić
- (1.88) (Croatia) Ana Semren
- (1.76) (Latvia) Elina Babkina

== Notable former players ==
- Elīna Babkina
- Luca Ivanković
- Lisa Ann Karčić
- Jelena Ivezić
- Milica Dabović
