= Lucia Kupčíková =

Slovak basketball player

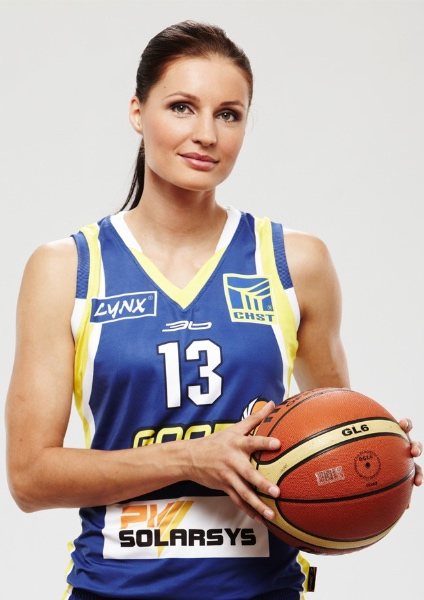

Personal information
- Born: 28 August 1984 (age 40); Poprad, Slovakia
- Listed height: 6 ft 1 in (1.85 m)

Career information
- Playing career: 2003–2018
- Position: Small forward
- Number: 13

Career history
- 2003-2006 2018: ŽBK Poprad
- 2006-2009: MBK Ružomberok
- 2009-2017: Good Angels Košice

Lucia Kupčíková (born 28 August 1984) is a Slovak former professional basketball player who played as small forward.

Kupčíková was born on 28 August 1984 in Poprad. She started her professional career at ŽBK Poprad in 2003. In 2006 she joined MBK Ružomberok, where she became the team captain. In 2009 she joined the Slovak champions Good Angels Košice to be able to play the EuroLeague.

Kupčíková stayed at Košice until her retirement in 2017, with a break in 2014 due to pregnancy. In 2018 she shortly returned to professional basketball to help her home team ŽBK Poprad in the playoffs.

Kupčíková was named Best Female Basketball Player in Slovakia in 2011, 2012 and 2013.
