= EuroBasket Women 2007 squads =

== Group A ==
=== Turkey ===
Turkey Women's National Basketball Team roster
Players
Coaches

Pos.	No.	Name	Age – Date of birth	Height	Club
	4	Şaziye İvegin-Karslı	–
	5	Gülşah Akkaya	–
	6	Birsel Vardarlı	–
	7	Nilay Yiğit	–
	8	Şebnem Kimyacıoğlu	–
	9	Esmeral Tunçluer	–
	10	Işıl Alben	–
	11	Nevriye Yılmaz	–
	12	Didem Sarıca	–
	13	Yasemin Horasan	–
	14	Bahar Çağlar	–
	15	Korel Engin	–

Head coach

- Cem Akdağ

Legend

- (C) Team captain
- nat field describes country
  of last club
  before the tournament
- Age field is age on June 7, 2007

== Group D ==
=== Serbia ===
Serbian Women's National Basketball Team roster
Players
Coaches

Pos.	No.	Name	Age – Date of birth	Height	Club
	4	Ines Kresović	–
	5	Sonja Petrović	–
	6	Maja Miljković	–
	7	Tamara Radočaj	–
	8	Monika Veselovski	–
	9	Zorica Mitov	–
	10	Miljana Bojović	–
	11	Marina Puškar	–
	12	Jasmina Ilić	–
	13	Milica Dabović	–
	14	Ivana Grubor	–
	15	Ana Perović	–

Head coach

- Jovica Antonić

Legend

- (C) Team captain
- nat field describes country
  of last club
  before the tournament
- Age field is age on June 7, 2007

=== Croatia ===
Croatia Women's National Basketball Team roster
Players
Coaches

Pos.	No.	Name	Age – Date of birth	Height	Club
	4	Sandra Mandir	–
	5	Anđa Jelavić	–
	6	Tina Periša	–
	7	Ana Lelas	–
	8	Jelena Ivezić	–
	9	Petra Štampalija	–
	10	Božena Erceg	–
	11	Sonja Kireta	–
	12	Dea Klein-Šumanovac	–
	13	Emilija Podrug	–
	14	Luca Ivanković	–
	15	Josipa Bura	–

Head coach

- Linda Antić

Legend

- (C) Team captain
- nat field describes country
  of last club
  before the tournament
- Age field is age on June 7, 2007
