= Basketball at the 2012 Summer Olympics – Women's team rosters =

This is a list of players named to participate in the women's basketball competition at the Games of the XXX Olympiad.

== Group A ==
=== Angola ===
The following is the Angola roster in the women's basketball tournament of the 2012 Summer Olympics.

Angola women's national basketball team roster – 2012 Summer Olympics roster
Players
Coaches

Pos.	No.	Name	Age – Date of birth	Height	Club	Ctr.
PG	4	Catarina Camufal	32 – March 30, 1980	5 ft 6 in (1.68 m)	Interclube	(Angola)
F	5	Ana Gonçalves	19 – February 14, 1993	6 ft 0 in (1.83 m)	Interclube Benguela	(Angola)
PG	6	Felizarda Jorge	27 – February 23, 1985	5 ft 8 in (1.73 m)	Primeiro de Agosto	(Angola)
SF	7	Ângela Cardoso	32 – March 30, 1980	5 ft 11 in (1.8 m)	Primeiro de Agosto	(Angola)
G	8	Fineza Eusébio	22 – July 18, 1990	5 ft 10 in (1.78 m)	Primeiro de Agosto	(Angola)
F	9	Madalena Felix	22 – September 20, 1989	5 ft 10 in (1.78 m)	Primeiro de Agosto	(Angola)
PF	10	Sónia Guadalupe	26 – September 15, 1985	6 ft 2 in (1.88 m)	Interclube	(Angola)
C	11	Luísa Tomás	29 – March 24, 1983	6 ft 4 in (1.93 m)	Interclube	(Angola)
SG	12	Astrida Vicente	33 – October 6, 1978	5 ft 8 in (1.73 m)	Interclube	(Angola)
SF	13	Nacissela Maurício (C)	32 – June 2, 1980	6 ft 3 in (1.91 m)	Primeiro de Agosto	(Angola)
PF	14	Nadir Manuel	25 – November 30, 1986	6 ft 1 in (1.85 m)	Interclube	(Angola)
SF	15	Ngiendula Filipe	30 – May 20, 1982	5 ft 10 in (1.78 m)	Interclube	(Angola)

Head coach

- (Angola) Aníbal Moreira

Legend

- (C) Team captain
- Club field describes current club

=== China ===
The following is the China roster in the women's basketball tournament of the 2012 Summer Olympics.

China women's national basketball team – 2012 Summer Olympics roster
Players
Coaches

Pos.	No.	Name	Age – Date of birth	Height	Club	Ctr.
G	4	Li Shanshan	25 – 3 March 1987	1.77 m (5 ft 10 in)	Jiangsu Phoenix	(China)
G	5	Song Xiaoyun	29 – 11 December 1982	1.75 m (5 ft 9 in)	Bayi Kylin	(China)
G	6	Ji Yanyan	27 – 29 May 1985	1.82 m (6 ft 0 in)	Heilongjiang Dragons	(China)
F	7	Zhao Shuang	22 – 21 June 1990	1.88 m (6 ft 2 in)	Shenyang Army Golden Lions	(China)
F	8	Miao Lijie	31 – 3 June 1981	1.78 m (5 ft 10 in)	Shenyang Army Golden Lions	(China)
C	9	Guan Xin	25 – 24 January 1987	1.96 m (6 ft 5 in)	Guangdong Dolphins	(China)
PF	10	Zhang Fan	27 – 22 August 1984	1.86 m (6 ft 1 in)	Beijing Great Wall	(China)
F	11	Ma Zengyu	29 – 7 May 1983	1.83 m (6 ft 0 in)	Liaoning Baocheng	(China)
PF	12	Gao Song	20 – 16 April 1992	1.90 m (6 ft 3 in)	Heilongjiang Dragons	(China)
PF	13	Chen Xiaoli	30 – 20 February 1982	1.93 m (6 ft 4 in)	Liaoning Baocheng	(China)
C	14	Wei Wei	22 – 6 October 1989	2.06 m (6 ft 9 in)	Guangdong Dolphins	(China)
C	15	Chen Nan	29 – 8 January 1983	1.95 m (6 ft 5 in)	Bayi Kylin	(China)

Head coach

- (China) Sun Fengwu

Legend

- Club – describes last
  club before the tournament
- Age – describes age
  on 28 July 2012

=== Croatia ===
The following is the Croatia roster in the women's basketball tournament of the 2012 Summer Olympics.

Croatia women's national basketball team – 2012 Summer Olympics roster
Players
Coaches

Pos.	No.	Name	Age – Date of birth	Height	Club	Ctr.
G	4	Sandra Mandir	34 – 4 August 1977	1.77 m (5 ft 10 in)	ŽKK Novi Zagreb	(Croatia)
G	5	Anđa Jelavić	31 – 21 September 1980	1.72 m (5 ft 8 in)	Kayseri Kaski S.K.	(Turkey)
F	6	Antonija Mišura	24 – 19 May 1988	1.79 m (5 ft 10 in)	ŽKK Jolly JBS	(Croatia)
F	7	Lisa Ann Karčić	25 – 11 November 1986	1.85 m (6 ft 1 in)	Caja Rural Tintos de Toro	(Spain)
G	8	Emanuela Salopek	25 – 18 April 1987	1.78 m (5 ft 10 in)	ŽKK Medveščak	(Croatia)
C	9	Marija Vrsaljko	22 – 8 August 1989	1.98 m (6 ft 6 in)	CB Avenida	(Spain)
G	10	Iva Ciglar	26 – 12 December 1985	1.67 m (5 ft 6 in)	Perpignan Basket	(France)
G/F	11	Ana Lelas	29 – 2 April 1983	1.83 m (6 ft 0 in)	Basket Lattes	(France)
F	12	Iva Slišković	27 – 4 September 1984	1.90 m (6 ft 3 in)	KK Kingtrade	(Croatia)
F	13	Mirna Mazić	26 – 24 December 1985	1.88 m (6 ft 2 in)	ŽKK Novi Zagreb	(Croatia)
C	14	Luca Ivanković	24 – 26 September 1987	1.98 m (6 ft 6 in)	ŽKK Jolly JBS	(Croatia)
G/F	15	Jelena Ivezić	28 – 17 March 1984	1.85 m (6 ft 1 in)	Ceyhan Belediyespor	(Turkey)

Head coach

- (Croatia) Stipe Bralić

Legend

- Club – describes last
  club before the tournament
- Age – describes age
  on 28 July 2012

=== Czech Republic ===
The following is the Czech Republic roster in the women's basketball tournament of the 2012 Summer Olympics.

Czech Republic women's national basketball team – 2012 Summer Olympics roster
Players
Coaches

Pos.	No.	Name	Age – Date of birth	Height	Club	Ctr.
F	4	Jana Veselá	28 – 31 December 1983	1.94 m (6 ft 4 in)	Homend Antakya	(Turkey)
F	5	Michaela Zrůstová	25 – 4 April 1987	1.86 m (6 ft 1 in)	Frisco SIKA Brno	(Czech Republic)
PG	6	Kateřina Bartoňová	22 – 17 January 1990	1.74 m (5 ft 9 in)	VS Prague	(Czech Republic)
SF	7	Kateřina Zohnová	27 – 7 November 1984	1.79 m (5 ft 10 in)	USO Mondeville	(France)
C	8	Ilona Burgrová	28 – 15 March 1984	1.95 m (6 ft 5 in)	ZVVZ USK Praha	(Czech Republic)
G	9	Hana Horáková	32 – 11 September 1979	1.79 m (5 ft 10 in)	UMMC Ekaterinburg	(Russia)
C	10	Alena Hanušová	21 – 29 May 1991	1.90 m (6 ft 3 in)	Frisco SIKA Brno	(Czech Republic)
SG	11	Kateřina Elhotová	22 – 14 October 1989	1.80 m (5 ft 11 in)	ZVVZ USK Praha	(Czech Republic)
G	12	Lenka Bartáková	21 – 17 May 1991	1.75 m (5 ft 9 in)	VS Prague	(Czech Republic)
C	13	Petra Kulichová	27 – 13 September 1984	1.98 m (6 ft 6 in)	Good Angels Košice	(Slovakia)
G	14	Tereza Pecková	25 – 10 July 1987	1.90 m (6 ft 3 in)	Frisco SIKA Brno	(Czech Republic)
F	15	Eva Vítečková	30 – 26 January 1982	1.90 m (6 ft 3 in)	ZVVZ USK Praha	(Czech Republic)

Head coach

- (Czech Republic) Lubor Blažek

Legend

- Club – describes last
  club before the tournament
- Age – describes age
  on 28 July 2012

=== Turkey ===
The following is the Turkey roster in the women's basketball tournament of the 2012 Summer Olympics.

Turkey women's national basketball team – 2012 Summer Olympics roster
Players
Coaches

Pos.	No.	Name	Age – Date of birth	Height	Club	Ctr.
G	4	Tuğba Palazoğlu	31 – 4 December 1980	1.72 m (5 ft 8 in)	Mersin BB	(Turkey)
F	5	Begüm Dalgalar	24 – 8 June 1988	1.8 m (5 ft 11 in)	Kayseri Kaski	(Turkey)
G	6	Birsel Vardarlı	28 – 12 July 1984	1.74 m (5 ft 9 in)	Fenerbahçe	(Turkey)
G	7	Nilay Kartaltepe	33 – 13 January 1979	1.70 m (5 ft 7 in)	Botaş SK	(Turkey)
F	8	Tuğçe Canıtez	21 – 10 November 1990	1.75 m (5 ft 9 in)	Westmont College	(United States)
G	9	Esmeral Tunçluer	32 – 7 June 1980	1.75 m (5 ft 9 in)	Fenerbahçe	(Turkey)
G	10	Işıl Alben	26 – 22 February 1986	1.72 m (5 ft 8 in)	Galatasaray Medical Park	(Turkey)
C	11	Nevriye Yılmaz	32 – 16 June 1980	1.94 m (6 ft 4 in)	Fenerbahçe	(Turkey)
C	12	Kuanitra Hollingsworth	23 – 15 November 1988	1.96 m (6 ft 5 in)	UMMC Ekaterinburg	(Russia)
F	13	Yasemin Horasan	28 – 1 August 1983	1.88 m (6 ft 2 in)	Beşiktaş	(Turkey)
F	14	Şaziye İvegin	30 – 8 February 1982	1.80 m (5 ft 11 in)	Galatasaray Medical Park	(Turkey)
F	15	Bahar Çağlar	23 – 28 September 1988	1.90 m (6 ft 3 in)	Galatasaray Medical Park	(Turkey)

Head coach

- (Turkey) Ceyhun Yıldızoğlu

Legend

- Club – describes last
  club before the tournament
- Age – describes age
  on 28 July 2012

=== United States ===
The following is the United States roster in the women's basketball tournament of the 2012 Summer Olympics.

United States women's national basketball team – 2012 Summer Olympics roster
Players
Coaches

Pos.	No.	Name	Age – Date of birth	Height	Club	Ctr.
G	4	Lindsay Whalen	30 – May 9, 1982	5 ft 9 in (1.75 m)	Minnesota Lynx	(United States)
F	5	Seimone Augustus	28 – April 30, 1984	6 ft 0 in (1.83 m)	Minnesota Lynx	(United States)
G	6	Sue Bird	31 – October 16, 1980	5 ft 9 in (1.75 m)	Seattle Storm	(United States)
F	7	Maya Moore	23 – June 11, 1989	6 ft 0 in (1.83 m)	Minnesota Lynx	(United States)
F	8	Angel McCoughtry	25 – September 10, 1986	6 ft 1 in (1.85 m)	Atlanta Dream	(United States)
F	9	Asjha Jones	31 – August 1, 1980	6 ft 3 in (1.91 m)	Connecticut Sun	(United States)
F	10	Tamika Catchings	33 – July 21, 1979	6 ft 1 in (1.85 m)	Indiana Fever	(United States)
F	11	Swin Cash	32 – September 22, 1979	6 ft 1 in (1.85 m)	Chicago Sky	(United States)
G/F	12	Diana Taurasi	30 – June 11, 1982	6 ft 0 in (1.83 m)	Phoenix Mercury	(United States)
C	13	Sylvia Fowles	27 – June 10, 1985	6 ft 6 in (1.98 m)	Chicago Sky	(United States)
C	14	Tina Charles	23 – December 5, 1988	6 ft 4 in (1.93 m)	Connecticut Sun	(United States)
F/C	15	Candace Parker	26 – April 19, 1986	6 ft 4 in (1.93 m)	Los Angeles Sparks	(United States)

Head coach

- (United States) Geno Auriemma

Assistant coach(es)

- (United States) Doug Bruno
- (United States) Jennifer Gillom
- (United States) Marynell Meadors

Legend

- Club – describes last
  club before the tournament
- Age – describes age
  on 28 July 2012

== Group B ==
=== Australia ===
The following was the Australia roster in the women's basketball tournament of the 2012 Summer Olympics.

Australia women's national basketball team – 2012 Summer Olympics roster
Players
Coaches

Pos.	No.	Name	Age – Date of birth	Height	Club	Ctr.
F	4	Jenna O'Hea	25 – 6 June 1987	1.85 m (6 ft 1 in)	Dandenong Rangers	(Australia)
G	5	Samantha Richards	29 – 24 February 1983	1.68 m (5 ft 6 in)	Bulleen Boomers	(Australia)
G	6	Jennifer Screen	30 – 19 February 1982	1.80 m (5 ft 11 in)	Adelaide Lightning	(Australia)
C	7	Abby Bishop	23 – 29 November 1988	1.89 m (6 ft 2 in)	Perpignan Basket	(France)
C	8	Suzy Batkovic	31 – 17 December 1980	1.95 m (6 ft 5 in)	Adelaide Lightning	(Australia)
G	9	Kathleen MacLeod	25 – 23 October 1986	1.68 m (5 ft 6 in)	Dandenong Rangers	(Australia)
PG	10	Kristi Harrower	37 – 4 March 1975	1.66 m (5 ft 5 in)	Bendigo Spirit	(Australia)
C	11	Laura Summerton	28 – 13 December 1983	1.91 m (6 ft 3 in)	Geas Basket	(Italy)
F	12	Belinda Snell	31 – 10 January 1981	1.82 m (6 ft 0 in)	CCC Polkowice	(Poland)
F	13	Rachel Jarry	20 – 6 December 1991	1.85 m (6 ft 1 in)	Bulleen Boomers	(Australia)
C	14	Liz Cambage	20 – 18 August 1991	2.03 m (6 ft 8 in)	Tulsa Shock	(United States)
PF	15	Lauren Jackson	31 – 11 May 1981	1.95 m (6 ft 5 in)	Seattle Storm	(United States)

Head coach

- (Australia) Carrie Graf

Assistant coach(es)

- (Australia) Phil Brown
- (Australia) Michele Timms
- (Australia) Peter Buckle

Legend

- Club – describes last
  club before the tournament
- Age – describes age
  on 29 July 2012

=== Brazil ===
The following is the Brazil roster in the women's basketball tournament of the 2012 Summer Olympics.

Brazil women's national basketball team – 2012 Summer Olympics roster
Players
Coaches

Pos.	No.	Name	Age – Date of birth	Height	Club	Ctr.
PG	4	Adriana Moisés Pinto	34 – June 12, 1978	5 ft 7 in (1.7 m)	Pallacanestro Faenza	(Italy)
SG	5	Karla Costa	33 – September 25, 1978	5 ft 9 in (1.75 m)	Americana Basketball	(Brazil)
G/F	6	Patrícia Ferreira	33 – March 21, 1979	6 ft 0 in (1.83 m)	Ourinhos Basquete	(Brazil)
PG	7	Joice Rodrigues	25 – September 9, 1986	5 ft 9 in (1.75 m)	Ourinhos Basquete	(Brazil)
F	9	Franciele Nascimento	24 – October 19, 1987	6 ft 2 in (1.88 m)	Txingudi Saski Balio Elkartea	(Spain)
G/F	10	Silvia Gustavo	30 – May 14, 1982	6 ft 1 in (1.85 m)	Ourinhos Basquete	(Brazil)
F/C	11	Clarissa dos Santos	26 – July 30, 1985	6 ft 2 in (1.88 m)	Ourinhos Basquete	(Brazil)
F/C	12	Damiris Dantas	19 – November 17, 1992	6 ft 3 in (1.91 m)	Minnesota Lynx	(United States)
C	13	Nádia Colhado	23 – February 25, 1989	6 ft 4 in (1.93 m)	Santo André/Semasa	(Brazil)
C	14	Érika de Souza	30 – March 9, 1982	6 ft 5 in (1.96 m)	Atlanta Dream	(United States)
PG	15	Tássia Carcavalli	20 – May 31, 1992	5 ft 9 in (1.75 m)	Americana Basketball	(Brazil)

Head coach

- (Brazil) Luis Cicchetto

Assistant coach(es)

- (Brazil) Cristiano Cedra
- (Brazil) Maria do Carmo Mardegan Ferreira

Legend

- (C) Team captain
- Age – describes age
  on 28 July 2012
- Club – describes last
  club before the tournament
- nat – country of last club

=== Canada ===
The following is the Canada roster in the women's basketball tournament of the 2012 Summer Olympics.

Canada women's national basketball team – 2012 Summer Olympics roster
Players
Coaches

Pos.	No.	Name	Age – Date of birth	Height	Club	Ctr.
C	4	Krista Phillips	24 – 18 May 1988	1.98 m (6 ft 6 in)	Dandenong Rangers	(Australia)
G	5	Teresa Gabriele	33 – 23 January 1979	1.65 m (5 ft 5 in)	Free agent
PG	6	Shona Thorburn	29 – 7 August 1982	1.78 m (5 ft 10 in)	Uni Girona CB	(Spain)
SG	7	Courtnay Pilypaitis	24 – 11 February 1988	1.85 m (6 ft 1 in)	VICI Kaunas	(Lithuania)
SG	8	Kim Smith	28 – 7 May 1984	1.85 m (6 ft 1 in)	Free agent
PF	9	Miranda Ayim	24 – 6 May 1988	1.91 m (6 ft 3 in)	Istanbul University	(Turkey)
SG	10	Alisha Tatham	25 – 14 October 1986	1.80 m (5 ft 11 in)	Free agent
PF	11	Natalie Achonwa	19 – 2 November 1992	1.90 m (6 ft 3 in)	University of Notre Dame	(United States)
SF	12	Lizanne Murphy	28 – 15 March 1984	1.85 m (6 ft 1 in)	Tarbes Gespe Bigorre	(France)
G/F	13	Tamara Tatham	26 – 19 August 1985	1.85 m (6 ft 1 in)	SV Halle Lions	(Germany)
PF	14	Chelsea Aubry	28 – 27 June 1984	1.88 m (6 ft 2 in)	Bendigo Spirit	(Australia)
SF	15	Michelle Plouffe	19 – 15 September 1992	1.91 m (6 ft 3 in)	University of Utah	(United States)

Head coach

- (Canada) Allison McNeill

Assistant coach(es)

- (Canada) Lisa Thomaidis
- (Canada) Mike McNeill

Legend

- Club – describes last
  club before the tournament
- Age – describes age
  on 28 July 2012

=== France ===
The following is the France roster in the women's basketball tournament of the 2012 Summer Olympics.

France women's national basketball team – 2012 Summer Olympics roster
Players
Coaches

Pos.	No.	Name	Age – Date of birth	Height	Club	Ctr.
C	4	Isabelle Yacoubou	26 – 21 April 1986	1.90 m (6 ft 3 in)	Spartak Moscow	(Russia)
C	5	Endéné Miyem	24 – 15 May 1988	1.88 m (6 ft 2 in)	CJM Bourges Basket	(France)
G	6	Clémence Beikes	28 – 19 October 1983	1.80 m (5 ft 11 in)	Union Hainaut	(France)
C	7	Sandrine Gruda	25 – 25 June 1987	1.92 m (6 ft 4 in)	UMMC Ekaterinburg	(Russia)
G	8	Edwige Lawson-Wade	33 – 14 May 1979	1.66 m (5 ft 5 in)	Lattes-Maurin Montpellier	(France)
G	9	Céline Dumerc	30 – 9 July 1982	1.69 m (5 ft 7 in)	CJM Bourges Basket	(France)
G	10	Florence Lepron	27 – 16 January 1985	1.82 m (6 ft 0 in)	Tarbes Gespe Bigorre	(France)
G	11	Émilie Gomis	28 – 18 October 1983	1.78 m (5 ft 10 in)	ESB Villeneuve-d'Ascq	(France)
G	12	Marion Laborde	25 – 9 December 1986	1.78 m (5 ft 10 in)	Basket Landes	(France)
C	13	Élodie Godin	27 – 5 July 1985	1.90 m (6 ft 3 in)	Taranto Cras Basket	(Italy)
C	14	Emmeline Ndongue	29 – 25 April 1983	1.94 m (6 ft 4 in)	CJM Bourges Basket	(France)
F	15	Jennifer Digbeu	25 – 14 April 1987	1.90 m (6 ft 3 in)	ESB Villeneuve-d'Ascq	(France)

Head coach

- (France) Pierre Vincent

Legend

- Club – describes last
  club before the tournament
- Age – describes age
  on 28 July 2012

=== Great Britain ===
The following is the Great Britain roster in the women's basketball tournament of the 2012 Summer Olympics.

Great Britain women's national basketball team – 2012 Summer Olympics roster
Players
Coaches

Pos.	No.	Name	Age – Date of birth	Height	Club	Ctr.
G	4	Natalie Stafford	35 – 8 December 1976	1.76 m (5 ft 9 in)	Sydney Uni Flames	(Australia)
G	5	Rose Anderson	24 – 23 March 1988	1.78 m (5 ft 10 in)	UWIC Archers	(United Kingdom)
G	6	Stef Collins	29 – 30 December 1982	1.68 m (5 ft 6 in)	UWIC Archers	(United Kingdom)
PG	7	Rachael Vanderwal	29 – 27 June 1983	1.75 m (5 ft 9 in)	University of Limerick	(Republic of Ireland)
F	8	Chantelle Handy	25 – 16 June 1987	1.88 m (6 ft 2 in)	Sony Athinaikos Athens	(Greece)
G	9	Jenaya Wade-Fray	23 – 5 September 1988	1.75 m (5 ft 9 in)	UWIC Archers	(United Kingdom)
F	10	Julie Page	29 – 21 April 1983	1.88 m (6 ft 2 in)	Energa Toruń	(Poland)
PF	11	Kim Butler	29 – 7 September 1982	1.89 m (6 ft 2 in)	SK Cēsis	(Latvia)
C	12	Dominique Allen	22 – 10 September 1989	1.92 m (6 ft 4 in)	Oral Roberts University	(United States)
G	13	Jo Leedham	24 – 5 December 1987	1.80 m (5 ft 11 in)	Bulleen Boomers	(Australia)
C	14	Azania Stewart	23 – 13 March 1989	1.92 m (6 ft 4 in)	University of Florida	(United States)
F	15	Temi Fagbenle	19 – 8 September 1992	1.92 m (6 ft 4 in)	Harvard University	(United States)

Head coach

- (Australia) Tom Maher

Assistant coach(es)

- (Canada) Ken Shields

Legend
- Club is latest as prior to tournament.
- Age is as at 29 July 2012.

=== Russia ===
The following is the Russia roster in the women's basketball tournament of the 2012 Summer Olympics.

Russia women's national basketball team – 2012 Summer Olympics roster
Players
Coaches

Pos.	No.	Name	Age – Date of birth	Height	Club	Ctr.
PF	4	Olga Arteshina	29 – 27 November 1982	1.88 m (6 ft 2 in)	UMMC Ekaterinburg	(Russia)
SF	5	Evgeniya Belyakova	26 – 27 June 1986	1.82 m (6 ft 0 in)	Chevakata Vologda	(Russia)
PF	6	Natalia Vodopyanova	31 – 4 June 1981	1.90 m (6 ft 3 in)	WBC Dynamo Kursk	(Russia)
C	7	Marina Kuzina	27 – 19 July 1985	1.95 m (6 ft 5 in)	WBC Dynamo Moscow	(Russia)
SG	8	Elena Danilochkina	26 – 27 January 1986	1.83 m (6 ft 0 in)	Chevakata Vologda	(Russia)
PG	9	Becky Hammon	35 – 11 March 1977	1.75 m (5 ft 9 in)	Spartak Moscow Region	(Russia)
SG	10	Ilona Korstin	32 – 30 May 1980	1.82 m (6 ft 0 in)	Spartak Moscow Region	(Russia)
C	11	Natalya Vieru	23 – 25 July 1989	1.98 m (6 ft 6 in)	Spartak Moscow Region	(Russia)
C	12	Irina Osipova	31 – 25 June 1981	1.96 m (6 ft 5 in)	Istanbul University	(Turkey)
PF	13	Anna Petrakova	27 – 4 December 1984	1.89 m (6 ft 2 in)	WBC Dynamo Kursk	(Russia)
SF	14	Natalya Zhedik	24 – 11 July 1988	1.82 m (6 ft 0 in)	WBC Spartak Saint Petersburg	(Russia)
C	15	Nadezhda Grishaeva	23 – 2 July 1989	1.95 m (6 ft 5 in)	ASPTT Arras	(France)

Head coach

- (Russia) Boris Sokolovsky

Legend

- Club – describes last
  club before the tournament
- Age – describes age
  on 28 July 2012
