= 2011–12 Galatasaray S.K. (women's basketball) season =

Galatasaray Medical Park
2011–12 season
- Chairman: (Turkey) Ünal Aysal
- Manager: (Turkey) Ceyhun Yıldızoğlu
- 2011 Turkish President Cup: Winner

Galatasaray SK. women's 2011–2012 season is the 2011–2012 basketball season for Turkish professional basketball club Galatasaray Medical Park.

The club competes in EuroLeague Women, Turkish Women's Basketball League, and the Turkish Cup Basketball.

== Depth chart ==
Pos.	Starting 5	Bench 1	Bench 2
C	Sylvia Fowles	Tina Charles	Ivanka Matić
PF	Bahar Çağlar	Melisa Can
SF	Alba Torrens	Şaziye İvegin	Gülşah Gümüşay
SG	Diana Taurasi	Ayşe Cora	Sariye Kumral
PG	Işıl Alben	Epiphanny Prince	Yasemen Saylar

== Squad changes for the 2011–2012 season ==
In: Note: Flags indicate national team as defined under FIFA eligibility rules; some limited exceptions apply. Players may hold more than one non-FIFA nationality.

No.	Pos.	Nation	Player
7	SG	ESP	Alba Torrens (from Perfumerías Avenida)
13	SG	USA	Diana Taurasi (from Free agent)
31	C	USA	Tina Charles (from Connecticut Sun)
14	SF	TUR	Şaziye İvegin (from Fenerbahçe)
8	PF	TUR	Ayşe Cora (from Beşiktaş JK)
99	G	USA	Epiphanny Prince (from Chicago Sky)
4	SG	TUR	Sariye Kumral (from TED Ankara Kolejlier)
11	C	BIH	Ivanka Matić (from Tarbes Gespe Bigorre)

Out: Note: Flags indicate national team as defined under FIFA eligibility rules; some limited exceptions apply. Players may hold more than one non-FIFA nationality.

No.	Pos.	Nation	Player
24		USA	Tamika Catchings (to Indiana Fever)
13		LTU	Gintare Petronyte (to Free agent)
33		USA	Seimone Augustus (to WBC Spartak Moscow Region)
4		TUR	Tuğba Palazoğlu (to Free agent)
6		USA	Doneeka Lewis (to Free agent)
21		TUR	Nihan Anaz (to Free agent)

== Results, schedules and standings ==
=== Preseason games ===
August 10
17:30 TSI

(Report)

Miami University RedHawks	72–56	Galatasaray MP
Scoring by quarter: 19–21, 23–6, 17–17, 13–12
Pts: Rachael Hencke 12, Hannah Robertson 11, Kelsey Simon 11; Rebs: Rachael Hencke 5, Hannah Robertson 5 Asts: -		Pts: Gülşah Gümüşay 18, Gizem Başaran 12, Bahar Çağlar 5 Rebs: Gizem Başaran 12, Bahar Çağlar 11; Asts: Bahar Çağlar 3

Abdi İpekçi Arena, Istanbul
Attendance: unknown

August 11
17:30 TSI

(Report)

Miami University RedHawks	62–58	Galatasaray MP
Scoring by quarter: 13–17, 10–5, 24–18, 15–18
Pts: Courtney Osborn 14, Kirsten Olowonski 7 Rebs: Courtney Osborn 14, Kirsten Olowonski 16		Pts: Gizem Başaran 16, Bahar Çağlar 17; Rebs: Gizem Başaran 13, Bahar Çağlar 9

Florya Metin Oktay Sports Complex and Training Center, Istanbul
Attendance: unknown

September 17
14:00 TSI

(Report)

Istanbul University Women's Basketball Team	44–58	Galatasaray MP
Scoring by quarter: 13–9, 6–24, 14–19, 11–16
Pts: - Rebs: - Asts: -		Pts: Alba Torrens 17, Bahar Çağlar 7, Melek Bilge 9, Işıl Alben 5, Ayşe Cora 4 Rebs: Bahar Çağlar 8, Ayşe Cora 4, Sariye Kumral 4, Işıl Alben 3 Asts: Sariye Kumral 6, Işıl Alben 3, Ayşe Cora 2

Florya Metin Oktay Sports Complex and Training Center, Istanbul
Attendance: -

September 24
15:30 TSI

(Report)

Beşiktaş JK	51–70	Galatasaray MP
Scoring by quarter: 10–15, 18–19, 19–17, 4–19
Pts: Ilona Korstin 16, Yasemin Horasan 11; Rebs: - Asts: -		Pts: Alba Torrens 21, Ivanka Matić 14, Şaziye İvegin 10, Işıl Alben 9, Bahar Çağlar 6 Rebs: Bahar Çağlar 6, Şaziye İvegin 5, Işıl Alben 3 Asts: Işıl Alben 3, Şaziye İvegin 2

Florya Metin Oktay Sports Complex and Training Center, Istanbul
Attendance: none

March 15

(Report)

Istanbul University Women's Basketball Team	70–65	Galatasaray MP
Scoring by quarter: 13–9, 6–24, 14–19, 11–16
Pts: - Rebs: - Asts: -

Istanbul
Attendance: -

==== Kartal Magic Cup 2011 ====
September 30
16:15 TSI

(Report)

Kayseri Kaski S.K.	68–82	Galatasaray MP
Scoring by quarter: 17–24, 15–18, 12–21, 24–19
Pts: Forge 14, Gizem 11, Esra 10; Rebs: - Asts: -		Pts: Ivanka Matić 21, Alba Torrens 18, Bahar Çağlar 13; Rebs: Alba Torrens 7, Bahar Çağlar 7 Asts: Işıl Alben 8, Alba Torrens 4, Bahar Çağlar 3

Hasan Doğan Spor Kompleksi, Istanbul
Attendance: none
Referees: Şeyhmus Melek, Murat Amaç

==== International Galatasaray Store Cup ====
Galatasaray MP won the cup.

October 3
19:30 TSI

(Report)

Galatasaray MP	61–57	Cras Basket Taranto
Scoring by quarter: 17–11, 12–21, 10–11, 22–14
Pts: Ivanka Matić 14, Alba Torrens 11, Epiphanny Prince 10; Rebs: Ivanka Matić 6, Ayşe Cora 6 Asts: Epiphanny Prince 3		Pts: Giorgia Sottana 14, Simona Ballardini 11; Rebs: Dubravka Dacic 6, Elodie Godin 5 Asts: Giorgia Sottana 4, Valentino Siccardi 4

Abdi İpekçi Arena, Istanbul
Attendance: none

October 4
19:30 TSI

(Report)

Galatasaray MP	79–54	Istanbul University Women's Basketball Team
Scoring by quarter: 25–11, 18–12, 16–11, 20–20
Pts: Matić 13, Ayşe 10, Prince 10, Işıl 11, Şaziye 11; Rebs: Bahar Çağlar 9 Asts: Alba Torrens 4		Pts: İlknur Dumlu 13, Esra Erden Atacan 13; Rebs: Mehtap Gezer 10; Asts: Esra Erden Atacan 4

Abdi İpekçi Arena, Istanbul
Attendance: none

October 5
19:30 TSI

(Report)

Galatasaray MP	72–68	Nadezhda Orenburg
Scoring by quarter: 16–24, 16–19, 11–21, 29–4
Pts: Alba Torrens 15, Gülşah Gümüşay 14, Bahar Çağlar 12; Rebs: Şaziye 5, Bahar Çağlar 12; Asts: -		Pts: - Rebs: - Asts: -

Abdi İpekçi Arena, Istanbul
Attendance: none

Results

Pos.	Club
1	(Turkey) Galatasaray MP
2	(Russia) Nadezhda Orenburg
3	(Italy) Cras Basket Taranto
4	(Turkey) Istanbul University Women's Basketball Team

=== Euroleague Women 2011–12 ===
- Galatasaray MP were already qualified for the Final 8.

=== Group A ===
	Team	Pld	W	L	PF	PA	Diff	Pts
1.	(Spain) Ros Casares Valencia	7	6	1	525	405	120	13
2.	(Turkey) Galatasaray Medical Park	7	6	1	540	495	45	13
3.	(Russia) UMMC Ekaterinburg	7	5	2	509	419	90	12
4.	(Czech Republic) ZVVZ USK Prague	7	4	3	484	492	-8	11
5.	(France) Bourges Basket	7	3	4	451	468	-17	10
6.	(Poland) Lotos Gdynia	7	2	5	521	550	-29	9
7.	(Lithuania) Vici Aistes Kaunas	7	1	6	458	548	-90	8
8.	(Hungary) Uni Seat Győr	7	1	6	481	592	-111	8

==== Regular season ====
October 13
19:30 TSI

(Report)

Galatasaray MP	83–66	Vici Aistes Kaunas
Scoring by quarter: 17–18, 21–15, 21–16, 24–17
Pts: Taurasi 31, Torrens 18, Charles 12, Prince 10; Rebs: Diana Taurasi 8, Tina Charles 4, Ivanka Matić 4 Asts: Diana Taurasi 6, Işıl Alben 3 Işıl Alben 8 steals		Pts: Vita Kuktiene 17, Courtnay Pilypaitis 16; Rebs: Sandra Linkeviciene 10; Asts: Sandra Linkeviciene 4, Courtnay Pilypaitis 4

Abdi İpekçi Arena, Istanbul
Attendance: 3,000
Referees: Boris Gabara (SVK), Maka Kupatadze (GEO), Saso Petek (SLO)

October 19
19:00 TSI

(Report)

ZVVZ USK Prague	70–78	Galatasaray MP
Scoring by quarter: 18–13, 16–18, 17–18, 19–29
Pts: Delisha Milton Jones 19, Ilona Burgrová 15, Katerina Elhotova 10; Rebs: Ilona Burgrová 12, Delisha Milton Jones 10, Eva Vitecková 6 Asts: Frida Eldebrink 3, Delisha Milton Jones 3		Pts: Torrens 23, Charles 18, Taurasi 10; Rebs: Charles 11, Taurasi 6, Prince 6 Asts: Torrens 6, Işıl Alben 3

Sport Hall Folimanka, Prague
Attendance: unknown
Referees: Neil Wilkinson (ENG), Erez Gurion (ISR), Saverio Lanzarini (ITA)

October 26
20:00 TSI

(Report)

Galatasaray MP	84–65	UMMC Ekaterinburg
Scoring by quarter: 16–21, 24–14, 19–11, 25–19
Pts: Taurasi 27, Charles 24, Torrens 10, Işıl Alben 8 Rebs: Charles 14, Ivanka Matić 9, Işıl Alben 6, Melisa Can 6 Asts: Işıl Alben 7		Pts: Sandrine Gruda 17, Anete Jekabsone 14, Cappie Pondexter 11; Rebs: Maria Stepanova 9 Asts: Candace Parker 2

Abdi İpekçi Arena, Istanbul
Attendance: 1000
Referees: Benjamin Barth (GER), Fabiana Nitu (ROU), Zdenko Zubak (SVK)

November 3
19:00 TSI

(Report)

Seat-Szese Győr	82–106	Galatasaray MP
Scoring by quarter: 14–24, 16–28, 23–27, 29–27
Pts: Iva Ciglar 18, Zsófia Simon 18, Nóra Nagy 17, Rita Rasheed 16; Rebs: Nora Nagy 8 Asts: Iva Ciglar 5		Pts: Taurasi 24, Torrens 21, Charles 17, Ivanka Matić 15, Prince 13; Rebs: Ivanka Matić 8, Taurasi 6, Charles 5, Bahar 5 Asts: Taurasi 5, Torrens 5, Prince5, Ivanka Matić 4

Magvassy Csarnok, Győr
Attendance: unknown
Referees: Bojan Jovanic (BIH), Ognjen Jokic (MNE), Semen Ovinov (RUS)

November 9
20:00 TSI

(Report)

Galatasaray MP	77–71	Lotos Gdynia
Scoring by quarter: 24–16, 17–14, 18–17, 18–24
Pts: Taurasi 21, Charles 16, Prince 12, Torrens 10; Rebs: Ivanka Matić 9, Taurasi 6, Charles 8, Bahar 8 Asts: Taurasi 7		Pts: J. Anderson 20, A. Knezevic 17, A. Henry 15; Rebs: A. Henry 17, I. Ajanovic 8, G. Robert 8 Asts: I. Jalcova 4

Abdi İpekçi Arena, Istanbul
Attendance: 4,000
Referees: Vladimir Tsekov (BUL), Aleksandar Glisic (SRB), Toni Rodriguez (GER)

November 16
21:00 TSI

(Report)

Bourges Basket	65–66	Galatasaray MP
Scoring by quarter: 18–18, 23–18, 13–12, 11–18
Pts: Catherine Joens 25, Endene Miyem 10; Rebs: Marielle Amant 12; Asts: Endene Miyem 4		Pts: Charles 25, Taurasi 17, Torrens 12, Prince 11; Rebs: Charles 18; Asts: Taurasi 3

Palais des Sports du Prado, France
Attendance: 3,000
Referees: Branislav Mrdak (SRB), Yair Michaelly (ISR), Jonas Bille (DEN)

November 23
20:00 TSI

(Report)

Galatasaray MP	46–76	Ros Casares
Scoring by quarter: 13–22, 6–12, 7–22, 20–20
Pts: Taurasi 14; Rebs: Charles 10; Asts: Bahar Çağlar 3		Pts: Sancho Lyttle 20, Laia Palau 20, Silivia Dominguez 11; Rebs: Ann Wauters 15; Asts: Laia Palau 7

Abdi İpekçi Arena, Istanbul
Attendance: 2,800
Referees: Juris Kokainis (LAT), David Berekashvili (GEO), Josip Radojkovic (CRO)

November 30
17:15 TSI

(Report)

VICI Aistes Kaunas	66–84	Galatasaray MP
Scoring by quarter: 13–19, 16–26, 14–20, 23–19
Pts: Liktarovich 17, Kamezys 10; Rebs: Kamezys 9 Asts: Kamezys 2		Pts: Prince 16, Işıl Alben 15, Bahar Çağlar 10, Ivanka Matic 10; Rebs: Ivanka Matic 7 Asts: Işıl Alben 5

Kaunas Sports Hall, Kaunas
Attendance: 300
Referees: Mart Uuehendrik (EST), Vladan Sundic (MNE), Clemens Fritz (GER)

December 8
17:00 TSI

(Report)

Galatasaray MP	75–67	ZVVZ USK Prague
Scoring by quarter: 22–11, 13–18, 21–23, 19–15
Pts: Taurasi 26, Charles 25, Prince 12; Rebs: Charles 10; Asts: Bahar Çağlar 4		Pts: Katerina Elhotova 16, DeLisha Milton-Jones 13, Anna Montañana 12; Rebs: DeLisha Milton-Jones 9 Asts: DeLisha Milton-Jones 5

Abdi İpekçi Arena, Istanbul
Attendance: 5,000
Referees: Neil Wilkinson (ENG), Maka Kupatadze (GEO), Nicolaas Zwiep (NED)

December 14
17:15 TSI

(Report)

UMMC Ekaterinburg	85–80	Galatasaray MP
Scoring by quarter: 24–27, 24–19, 22–11, 15–23
Pts: Candace Parker 17, Pondexter 15; Rebs: Candace Parker 7 Asts: Pondexter 5		Pts: Taurasi 28, Charles 18, Alba Torrens 13; Rebs: Charles 10; Asts: Taurasi 5

DIVS Sport Hall, Ekaterinburg
Attendance: 5230
Referees: Gili Cohen (ISR), Aliaksandr Syrytsa (BLR), Jasmina Juras (SRB)

=== Turkish Basketball League 2011–12 ===
==== Regular season ====
October 22
19:30 TSI

(Report)

Galatasaray MP	100–75	Ceyhan Belediyesi B.K.
Scoring by quarter: 17–20, 20–15, 29–21, 34–19
Pts: Tina Charles 23, Diana Taurasi 22, Alba Torrens 14, Epiphanny Prince 12, Bahar Çağlar 10; Rebs: Tina Charles 14, Melisa Can 9, Bahar Çağlar 7 Asts: Alba Torrens 5, Bahar Çağlar 4		Pts: Natasha Lacy 22, Ashley Janeen Walker 20, Tiffany Elauie 17; Rebs: Ashley Janeen Walker 11, Natasha Lacy 9, Tiffany Elauie 8 Asts: Natasha Lacy 6

Abdi İpekçi Arena, Istanbul
Attendance: none
Referees: Murat Ciner, Ali Rıza Bozokluoğlu, Semcen Demircan

October 30
16:15 TSI

(Report)

Kayseri Kaski S.K.	80–84	Galatasaray MP
Scoring by quarter: 14–31, 18–10, 20–20, 28–23
Pts: Latoya Antoinette Sand 22, Anna Lois De Forge 15, Doneeka Hodges 14, Bahar Öztürk 14; Rebs: Latoya Antoinette Sand 10, Bahar Öztürk 10; Asts: Bahar Öztürk 3		Pts: Diana Taurasi 29, Tina Charles 16, Işıl Alben 8 Rebs: Diana Taurasi 8, Tina Charles 14, Işıl Alben 9 Asts: Diana Taurasi 5, Işıl Alben 6

Kadir Has Spor Salonu, Kayseri
Attendance: none
Referees: Aydın Karaçam, Mustafa Akilloğlu, Kerem Aytunç Saygan

November 6
15:00 TSI

(Report)

Galatasaray MP	82–63	Beşiktaş
Scoring by quarter: 25–17, 17–14, 21–11, 19–21
Pts: Diana Taurasi 22, Alba Torrens 15, Tina Charles 16, Bahar Çağlar 10; Rebs: Tina Charles 8, Işıl Alben 8, Bahar Çağlar 7 Asts: Diana Taurasi 9, Işıl Alben 4, Alba Torrens 4		Pts: Jantel Cherill Lavent 36, Tuğba Taşçı 10; Rebs: Jantel Cherill Lavent 10, Amber Shanee Harris 7 Asts: Courney Michel Vand 5, Esra Şencebe 4

Abdi İpekçi Arena, Istanbul
Attendance: none
Referees: Özlem Yalman, Ali Rıza Bozokluoğlu, Sencer Yılmaz,

November 12
16:00 TSI

(Report)

Samsun Basket	63–88	Galatasaray MP
Scoring by quarter: 14–27, 15–17, 16–22, 18–22
Pts: Mary Miller 17, Jillian Robbins 14, Jayne Appel 15; Rebs: Kelly Miller 8, Jayne Appel 8 Asts: Kelly Miller 3		Pts: Diana Taurasi 31, Alba Torrens 15, Epiphanny Prince 10; Rebs: Tina Charles 12; Asts: Diana Taurasi 3, Alba Torrens 3

Yaşar Doğu Spor Salonu, Samsun
Attendance: none
Referees: Erman Erdemli, Çetin Artan, Göksun Öz

November 19
15:00 TSI

(Report)

Galatasaray MP	84–68	Tarsus Belediyesi B.K.
Scoring by quarter: 20–12, 17–16, 27–21, 20–18
Pts: Diana Taurasi 25, Tina Charles 14, Epiphanny Prince 14, Işıl Alben 12; Rebs: Diana Taurasi 7, Tina Charles 12, Epiphanny Prince 5, Işıl Alben 5 Asts: Epiphanny Prince 6, Işıl Alben 5		Pts: Tangela Nicole Smith 21, Yasemin Begüm 12; Rebs: Tangela Nicole Smith 9 Asts: Charmaine Riley 3

Abdi İpekçi Arena, Istanbul
Attendance: unknown
Referees: Kaan Büyükçil, Seher Ayşe Nur Yazicioğlu, Ogün Ciliz

November 27
16:00 TSI

(Report)

Fenerbahçe	96–82	Galatasaray MP
Scoring by quarter: 21–19, 19–19, 29–23, 27–21
Pts: Angel McCoughtry 24, Nevriye Yılmaz 17, Birsel Vardarlı 16, Penny Taylor 15, Ivana Matovic 15; Rebs: Nevriye Yılmaz 12; Asts: Birsel Vardarlı 7		Pts: Diana Taurasi 33, Tina Charles 22, Epiphanny Prince 13; Rebs: Tina Charles 9 Asts: Epiphanny Prince 5

Caferağa Spor Salonu, Istanbul
Referees: Rüştü Nuran, Semih Vural, Ziya Özorhon

December 4
13:00 TSI

(Report)

Galatasaray MP	86–73	Optimum TED Ankara Kolejliler
Scoring by quarter: 20–21, 25–17, 22–14, 19–19
Pts: Sylvia Fowles 18, Tina Charles 17, Diana Taurasi 14, Melisa Can 10; Rebs: Tina Charles 11; Asts: Tina Charles 5, Epiphanny Prince 5		Pts: Matee Ajavon 16, Damya Walker 14, Erin Thom 14; Rebs: Damya Walker 8 Asts: Matee Ajavon 3

Abdi İpekçi Arena, Istanbul
Attendance: unknown
Referees: Mehmet Karabilecen, İbrahim Altintaş, Celal Pişman

December 10
15:00 TSI

(Report)

İstanbul Üniversitesi B.K.	63–72	Galatasaray MP
Scoring by quarter: 22–16, 21–18, 8–21, 12–17
Pts: Miranda Joy Ayim 16, Roneeka Rayshell Hodges 14, Tamera Yvonne Young 10; Rebs: Roneeka Rayshell Hodges 9, Tamera Yvonne Young 9 Asts: Bahar Yapar 4		Pts: Diana Taurasi 27, Sylvia Fowles 15, Epiphanny Prince 11, Tina Charles 10; Rebs: Tina Charles 10, Sylvia Fowles 9 Asts: Diana Taurasi 2

Avcılar Spor Salonu, Samsun
Attendance: none
Referees: Aydin Karaçam, Havva Mirhan Ateşer, Göksun Öz

December 17
13:00 TSI

(Report)

Galatasaray MP	75–61	Homend Antakya Bld.
Scoring by quarter: 25–15, 16–7, 17–17, 17–22
Pts: Sylvia Fowles 14, Bahar Çağlar, Diana Taurasi 14; Rebs: Sylvia Fowles 8 Asts: Işıl Alben 4		Pts: Makbule Amachree 16, Sheana Mosch 14; Rebs: Laura Harper 10; Asts: Pınar Turan 3

Abdi İpekçi Arena, Istanbul
Attendance: unknown
Referees: Önder Yilmaz, Elif Bektaş, Ogün Ciliz

December 21
15:00 TSI

(Report)

Mersin BŞB	59–89	Galatasaray MP
Scoring by quarter: 19–27, 13–23, 15–16, 12–23
Pts: Shavonte Zellous 26, Christi Thomas 11, Tuğba Palazoğlu 14; Rebs: Christi Thomas 13; Asts: Tuğba Palazoğlu 2		Pts: Sylvia Fowless 17, Tina Charles 16, Alba Torrens 17, Diana Taurasi 11; Rebs: Tina Charles 12, Sylvia Fowles 8 Asts: Diana Taurasi 8

Edip Buran Spor Salonu, Mersin
Referees: Sami Özel, Sertan Kırklar, Vural Göksu

December 31
14:00 TSI

(Report)

Galatasaray MP	86–63	Botaş B.K.
Scoring by quarter: 26–22, 29–13, 17–13, 14–15
Pts: Sylvia Fowles 14, Alba Torrens 20, Diana Taurasi 22; Rebs: Sylvia Fowles 10; Asts: Diana Taurasi 4		Pts: Monica Wright 11; Rebs: Courtney Paris 9 Asts: Nilay Kartaltepe

Abdi İpekçi Arena, Istanbul
Attendance: unknown
Referees: Murat Ciner, Semcem Demircan, Özgür İlkkurşun

== President Cup 2011–12 ==
October 16
15:00 TSI

(Report)

Galatasaray MP	85–78	Fenerbahçe
Scoring by quarter: 19–15, 24–16, 22–28, 20–19
Pts: Charles 26, Prince 18, Diana Taurasi 16, Bahar 14; Rebs: Charles 12, Prince 8, Alba Torrens 5 Asts: Diana Taurasi 6		Pts: Matović 20, Angel 15, Taylor 18, Babkina 14; Rebs: Nevriye Yılmaz 15, Matović 6, Taylor 6, Angel 5 Asts: Taylor 5

Ankara Arena, Ankara
Attendance: 10,000
Referees: Mehmet Keseratar, Aytuğ Ektiğ, Erman Erdem
