= Turkey women's national basketball team =

Women's national basketball team representing Turkey

Turkey
- FIBA ranking: 17 ▼1 (14 September 2026)
- Joined FIBA: 1936
- FIBA zone: FIBA Europe
- National federation: TBF
- Coach: Frédéric Dusart
- Nickname(s): Potanın Perileri (Fairies of the Basket)

Olympic Games
- Appearances: 2

World Cup
- Appearances: 3

EuroBasket
- Appearances: 11
- Medals: Silver: (2011); Bronze: (2013)
Home	Away

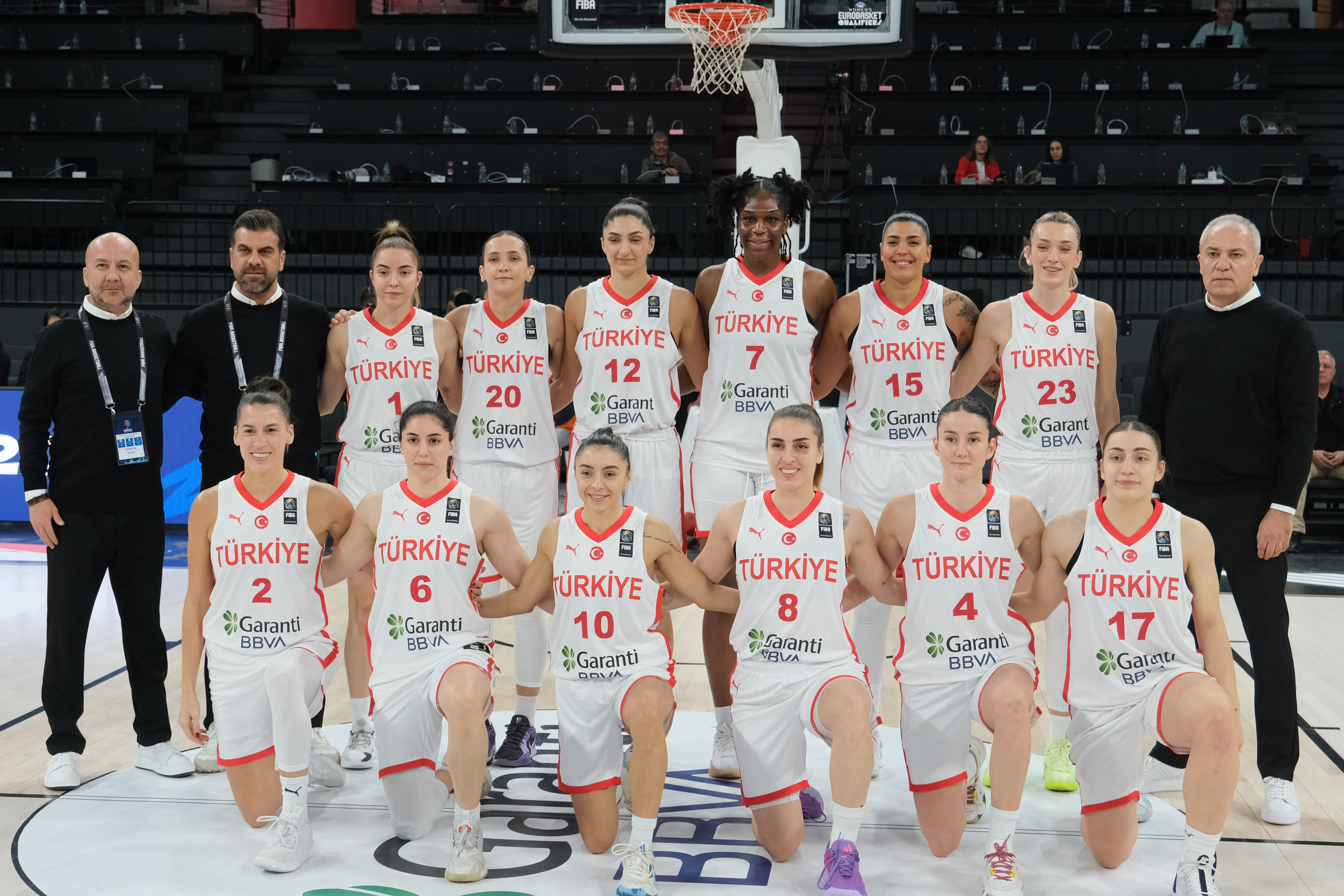
Roster in November 2024

The Turkey women's national basketball team is the women's basketball side that represents Turkey in international tournaments. They have come away from the EuroBasket tournaments with a silver medal in 2011 and bronze medal in 2013.

== History ==
On 19 October 2026, Frédéric Dusart was appointed head coach of the Turkish women's national team.

== Competitive record ==
=== Olympic Games ===
Year	Position	Pld	W	L
(United Kingdom) 2012	5th	6	4	2
(Brazil) 2016	6th	6	3	3
(Japan) 2020	Did not qualify			
(France) 2024	Did not qualify			
(United States) 2028	To be determined			
Total		12	7	5

=== FIBA Women's World Cup ===
Year	Position	Pld	W	L
(Chile) 1953	did not enter			
(Brazil) 1957	did not enter			
(Soviet Union) 1959	did not enter			
(Peru) 1964	did not enter			
(Czechoslovakia) 1967	did not enter			
(Brazil) 1971	did not enter			
(Colombia) 1975	did not enter			
(South Korea) 1979	did not enter			
(Brazil) 1983	did not enter			
(Soviet Union) 1986	did not enter			
(Malaysia) 1990	did not enter			
(Australia) 1994	did not enter			
(Germany) 1998	did not enter			
(China) 2002	did not enter			
(Brazil) 2006	did not enter			
(Czech Republic) 2010	did not enter			
(Turkey) 2014	4th	6	4	2
(Spain) 2018	10th	4	1	3
(Australia) 2022	Did not qualify			
(Germany) 2026	14th	3	0	3
(Japan) 2030	To be determined			
3/21		13	5	8

=== EuroBasket Women ===
Year	Rank	M	W	L	PF	PA	PD
(Italy) 1938	Did not enter						
(Hungary) 1950	Did not enter						
(Soviet Union) 1952	Did not enter						
(Socialist Federal Republic of Yugoslavia) 1954	Did not enter						
(Czechoslovakia) 1956	Did not enter						
(Poland) 1958	Did not enter						
(Bulgaria) 1960	Did not enter						
(France) 1962	Did not enter						
(Hungary) 1964	Did not enter						
(Romania) 1966	Did not enter						
(Italy) 1968	Did not enter						
(Netherlands) 1970	Did not enter						
(Bulgaria) 1972	Did not enter						
(Italy) 1974	Did not enter						
(France) 1976	Did not enter						
(Poland) 1978	Did not enter						
(Socialist Federal Republic of Yugoslavia) 1980	Did not enter						
(Italy) 1981	Did not enter						
(Hungary) 1983	Did not enter						
(Italy) 1985	Did not enter						
(Spain) 1987	Did not enter						
(Bulgaria) 1989	Did not enter						
(Israel) 1991	Did not enter						
(Italy) 1993	Did not enter						
(Czech Republic) 1995	Did not enter						
(Hungary) 1997	Did not enter						
(Poland) 1999	Did not enter						
(France) 2001	Did not enter						
(Greece) 2003	Did not enter						
(Turkey) 2005	8th	8	2	6	593	633	-40
(Italy) 2007	9th	6	2	4	394	432	-38
(Latvia) 2009	9th	6	3	3	372	395	-23
(Poland) 2011	2nd place, silver medalist(s)	9	5	4	545	538	+7
(France) 2013	3rd place, bronze medalist(s)	9	7	2	592	484	+108
(Hungary) / (Romania) 2015	5th	10	8	2	603	521	+82
(Czech Republic) 2017	5th	6	5	1	410	388	+22
(Latvia) / (Serbia) 2019	14th	3	1	2	168	177	-9
(France) / (Spain) 2021	14th	3	0	3	162	199	-37
(Slovenia) / (Israel) 2023	14th	3	1	2	198	219	-21
(Czech Republic) / (Germany) / (Italy) / (Greece) 2025	7th	6	3	3	489	456	+33
(Belgium) / (Finland) / (Sweden) / (Lithuania) 2027	To be determined						
11/41		69	37	32	4526	4442	+84

=== Mediterranean Games ===
Year	Position	Pld	W	L
(Syria) 1987	2nd place, silver medalist(s)	–	–	–
(Italy) 1997	2nd place, silver medalist(s)	–	–	–
(Tunisia) 2001	4th	6	3	3
(Spain) 2005	1st place, gold medalist(s)	4	4	0
(Italy) 2009	5th	5	3	2
(Turkey) 2013	Cancelled			
(Spain) 2018		3	1	2
(Algeria) 2022				
Total		12	8	4

== Team ==
=== Current roster ===
Roster for the 2026 FIBA Women's Basketball World Cup.

Turkey women's national basketball team roster
Players
Coaches

Pos.	No.	Name	Age – Date of birth	Height	Club	Ctr.
PF	1	Elif İstanbulluoğlu	21 – 4 April 2005	1.90 m (6 ft 3 in)	Louisville Cardinals	(United States)
SG	2	Sevgi Uzun	28 – 25 November 1997	1.78 m (5 ft 10 in)	Galatasaray	(Turkey)
PG	4	Olcay Çakır (C)	33 – 13 July 1993	1.82 m (6 ft 0 in)	Fenerbahçe	(Turkey)
SG	6	Gökşen Fitik	25 – 11 August 2001	1.75 m (5 ft 9 in)	Galatasaray	(Turkey)
SG	8	Ayşe Cora	33 – 3 March 1993	1.78 m (5 ft 10 in)	Galatasaray	(Turkey)
PF	11	Elif Bayram	24 – 18 September 2001	1.85 m (6 ft 1 in)	Galatasaray	(Turkey)
PF	15	Tilbe Şenyürek	31 – 26 April 1995	1.92 m (6 ft 4 in)	Spar Girona	(Spain)
PG	17	Derin Erdoğan	24 – 28 June 2002	1.74 m (5 ft 9 in)	Galatasaray	(Turkey)
SF	20	Sinem Ataş	31 – 1 January 1995	1.85 m (6 ft 1 in)	ÇBK Mersin	(Turkey)
PF	22	Kennedy Burke	29 – 14 February 1997	1.85 m (6 ft 1 in)	Connecticut Sun	(United States)
SF	30	Melek Uzunoğlu	24 – 26 March 2002	1.88 m (6 ft 2 in)	Emlak Konut	(Turkey)
C	33	Esra Ural	35 – 18 August 1991	1.98 m (6 ft 6 in)	ÇBK Mersin	(Turkey)

Head coach

- (France) Frédéric Dusart

Assistant coach(es)

- (Turkey) Murat Alkaş
- (Turkey) Fatih Gezer
- (Turkey) Burak Kaya

Legend

- (C) Team captain
- Club – describes last
  club before the tournament
- Age – describes age
  on 4 September 2026

=== Past rosters ===
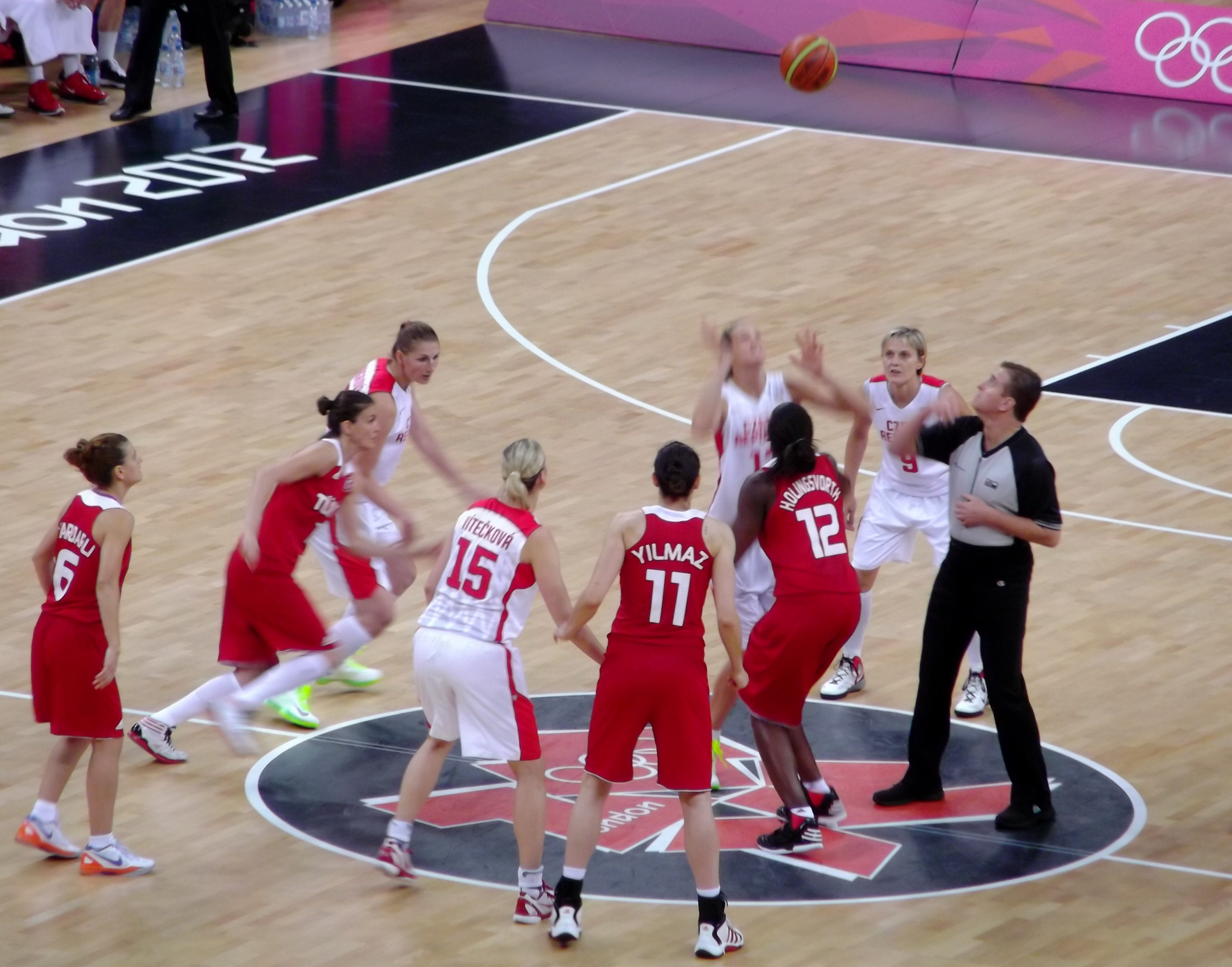
Turkey (red kit) vs. Czech Republic at the 2012 Summer Olympics.

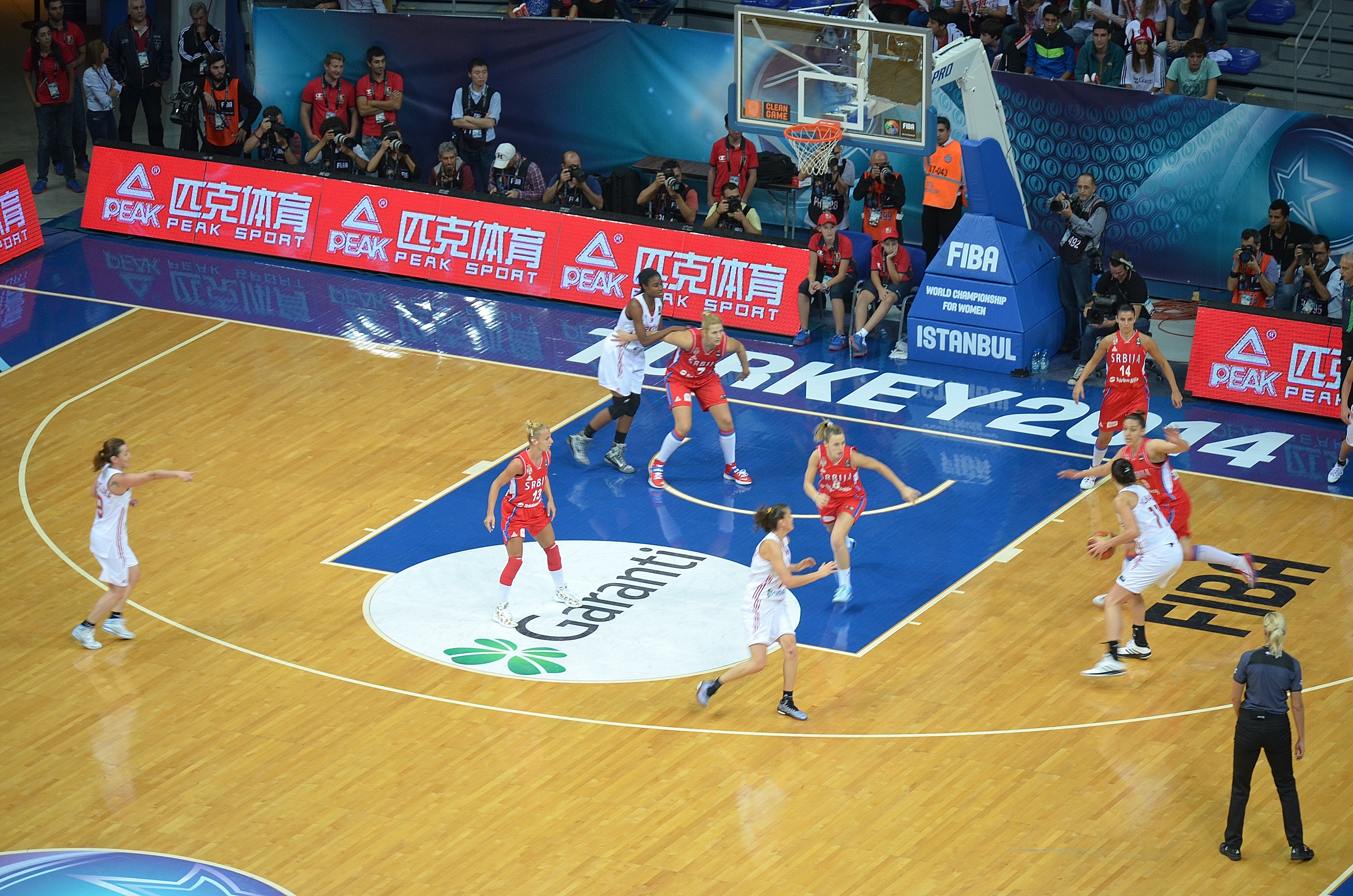
Turkey (white kit) vs. Serbia at the 2014 FIBA World Championship for Women.

2005 EuroBasket: finished 8th among 12 teams

Şaziye İvegin-Karslı, Birsel Vardarlı, Müjde Yüksel, Nilay Yiğit, Şebnem Kimyacıoğlu, Esmeral Tunçluer, Aylin Yıldızoğlu, Nevriye Yılmaz, Serap Yücesir, Yasemin Horasan, Arzu Bildirir, Korel Engin, (Coach: Cem Akdağ)

2007 EuroBasket: finished 9th among 16 teams

Şaziye İvegin-Karslı, Gülşah Akkaya, Birsel Vardarlı, Nilay Yiğit, Şebnem Kimyacıoğlu, Esmeral Tunçluer, Işıl Alben, Nevriye Yılmaz, Didem Sarıca, Yasemin Horasan, Bahar Çağlar, Korel Engin, (Coach: Cem Akdağ)

2009 EuroBasket: finished 9th among 16 teams

Şaziye İvegin-Karslı, Yasemen Saylar, Birsel Vardarlı, Nilay Yiğit, Tuğba Palazoğlu, Gülşah Gümüşay, Sariye Gökçe, Melek Bilge, Naile İvegin, Yasemin Horasan, Nevin Nevlin, Bahar Çağlar, (Coach: Ceyhun Yıldızoğlu)

2011 EuroBasket: finished 2nd among 16 teams

Nilay Yiğit, Birsel Vardarlı, Işıl Alben, Tuğba Palazoğlu, Seda Erdoğan, Gülşah Akkaya, Şaziye İvegin-Karslı, Bahar Çağlar, Yasemin Horasan, Naile Ivegin, Nevriye Yılmaz, Nevin Nevlin, (Coach: Ceyhun Yıldızoğlu)

2013 EuroBasket: finished 3rd among 16 teams

Tuğba Palazoğlu, Tuğçe Canıtez, Ayşegül Günay, Birsel Vardarlı, Yasemin Begüm Dalgalar, Esmeral Tunçluer, Işıl Alben, Nevriye Yılmaz, Naile Çırak, Quanitra Hollingsworth, Şaziye İvegin, Bahar Çağlar, (Coach: Ceyhun Yıldızoğlu)

2014 FIBA World Championship for Women: finished 4th among 16 teams

Tuğba Palazoğlu, Tuğçe Canıtez, Cansu Köksal, Birsel Vardarlı, Yasemin Begüm Dalgalar, Esmeral Tunçluer, Işıl Alben, Nevriye Yılmaz, LaToya Pringle, Tilbe Şenyürek, Şaziye İvegin, Bahar Çağlar, (Coach: Ceyhun Yıldızoğlu)

2015 EuroBasket: finished 5th among 20 teams

Pınar Demirok, Tuğçe Canıtez, Cansu Köksal, Birsel Vardarlı, Olcay Çakır, Bahar Çağlar, Işıl Alben, Nevriye Yılmaz, Lara Sanders, Ayşe Cora, Tilbe Şenyürek, Şaziye İvegin, (Coach: Sevgi Karasu)

2017 EuroBasket: finished 5th among 16 teams

Pelin Bilgiç, Ayşe Cora, Olcay Çakır, Birsel Vardarlı, Bahar Çağlar, Işıl Alben, Tuğçe Canıtez, Quanitra Hollingsworth, Şaziye İvegin, Tilbe Şenyürek, Cansu Köksal, Esra Ural, (Coach: Ekrem Memnun)

2018 FIBA World Championship for Women: finished 10th among 16 teams

Asena Yalçın, Ayşe Cora, Olcay Çakır, Cansu Köksal, Bahar Çağlar, Işıl Alben (C), Tuğçe Canıtez, Quanitra Hollingsworth, Tilbe Şenyürek, Merve Aydın, İlayda Güner, Esra Ural (Coach: Ekrem Memnun)

2019 EuroBasket: finished 14th among 16 teams

Asena Yalçın, Pelin Bilgiç, Ayşe Cora, Olcay Çakır, Cansu Köksal, Bahar Çağlar, Işıl Alben, Tuğçe Canıtez, Tilbe Şenyürek, İnci Güçlü, Esra Ural, Kiah Stokes (Coach: Osman Orak)

2021 EuroBasket: finished 14th among 16 teams

Pelin Bilgiç, Sevgi Uzun, Olcay Çakır, Melis Gülcan, Bahar Çağlar, Tuğçe Canıtez, Quanitra Hollingsworth, Meltem Yıldızhan, İnci Güçlü, Alperi Onar, Esra Ural Topuz, Gökşen Fitik (Coach: Ceyhun Yıldızoğlu)

2023 EuroBasket: finished 14th among 16 teams

Sevgi Uzun, Feride Akalan, Olcay Çakır (C), Gökşen Fitik, Teaira McCowan, Alperi Onar, Elif Bayram, Derin Erdoğan, Tilbe Şenyürek, Meltem Yıldızhan, İlayda Güner, Esra Ural, (Coach: Ekrem Memnun)

2025 EuroBasket: finished 7th among 16 teams

Elif İstanbulluoğlu, Sevgi Uzun, Olcay Çakır (C), Gökşen Fitik, Teaira McCowan, Pelin Bilgiç, Alperi Onar, Elif Bayram, Tilbe Şenyürek, Derin Erdoğan, Sinem Ataş, Esra Ural (Coach: Ekrem Memnun)

2026 FIBA Women's Basketball World Cup:

Elif İstanbulluoğlu, Sevgi Uzun, Olcay Çakır (C), Gökşen Fitik, Ayşe Cora, Elif Bayram, Tilbe Şenyürek, Derin Erdoğan, Sinem Ataş, Kennedy Burke, Melek Uzunoğlu, Esra Ural (Coach: Andrea Mazzon)

== See also ==
- Turkey national basketball team
- Turkey women's national under-20 basketball team
- Turkey women's national under-18 and under-19 basketball team
- Turkey women's national under-16 and under-17 basketball team
- Turkey women's national 3x3 team
