= Kimyacıoğlu =

Kimyacıoğlu is a Turkish surname. Notable people with the surname include:

- Şebnem Kimyacıoğlu (born 1983), Turkish-American basketball player
- Yasemin Kimyacıoğlu (born 1985), Turkish-American basketball player
