= Cengizhan Kartaltepe =

Turkish volleyball player (born 1973)

Personal information
- Full name: Cengizhan Kartaltepe
- Born: June 24, 1973 (age 53); Bandırma-Balıkesir, Turkey
- Height: 1.93 m (6 ft 4 in)

Volleyball information
- Position: Libero

Career
Years	Teams
1992–1995	Arçelik
1995–1996	Halkbank
1996–1999	Arçelik
1999–2004	Erdemir
2004–2006	Halkbank
2006–2008	Havagücü
2008–2009	MEF Okulları
2009–2011	Fenerbahçe SK

National team
1993–2005	Turkey
Honours
Men's volleyball
Representing Turkey
Mediterranean Games
Silver medal – second place	Bari 1997	Team competition
Bronze medal – third place	Languedoc-Roussillon 1993	Team competition
Representing Fenerbahçe SK
Balkan Cup
Gold medal – first place	Thessaloniki 2009	Team competition

Cengizhan Kartaltepe (born June 24, 1973 in Bandırma, Balıkesir) is a former Turkish volleyball player. He is 193 cm and played as libero. He played 151 times for the national team and also played for Erdemir, Arçelik, and Halkbankası.

In July 2008, after completing his military service at Izmir Air Force, he joined MEF Okulları.

He signed with Fenerbahçe SK in June 2009. He played for the team until 2011 and wore the number 1.

== Personal life ==
Kartaltepe married former Turkish national women's basketball player Nilay Yiğit in 2010.

== Honours and awards ==
- 5 times Turkish Men's Volleyball League Champion
- 8 times Turkish Cup runner-up
- 1 time Turkish Cup Champion
- 2 times CEV Champions League Final 4
- 2009-10 Balkan Cup Champion with Fenerbahçe SK
