= Tarullo =

Tarullo is a surname. Notable people with the surname include:

- Daniel Tarullo (born 1952), American government official
- Matthew Tarullo (born 1982), American football player
- Anna Maria Tarullo, Sports anchor, host, reporter

== See also ==
- Tarallo
