= Naile İvegin =

Turkish basketball player

Naile İvegin Çırak
Antalya 07 Basketbol SK
- Position: Power forward
- League: Turkish Women's Basketball League-Euroleague Women-Eurocup Women

Personal information
- Born: 29 May 1985 (age 41) Niksar, Tokat Province, Turkey
- Listed height: 6 ft 1 in (1.85 m)

Career information
- Playing career: 2000–present

Career history
- 2000–08: Botaşspor
- 2008–10: Beşiktaş
- 2009–11: Tarsus Belediye Spor
- 2011–12: Botaşspor
- 2012–14: Homend Antakya Belediyespor
- 2014-15: Yakındoğu Üniversitesi
- 2018-20: Ormanspor (Kadın Basketbol Takımı)
- 2020-21: Elazığ İl Özel İdarespor
- 2021-22: Antalya 07 Basketbol SK
Medals
EuroBasket
Bronze medal – third place	2013 France	Team
Silver medal – second place	2011 Poland	Team

Naile İvegin Çırak (born Naile İvegin on 29 May 1985 in Niksar, Tokat Province, Turkey) is a Turkish female basketball player. The 1.85 m (6 ft 1 in) national plays power forward. She currently plays for Antalya 07 Basketbol SK.

== Early years ==
A basketball player’s daughter, İvegin started basketball in elementary school on the same day as two of her sisters Şaziye and Ayşe. The three sisters played in the Adana-based club Botaşspor.

== Career ==
After eight years with Botaş, İvegin transferred to Beşiktaş in 2008, where she played two seasons. She returned to her first team Botaş in 2011 after playing two seasons in Tarsus Belediye Spor. In the 2012-13 season, she signed with Homend Antakya Belediye Spor.

She was a member of the national team, which placed 9th at the EuroBasket Women 2009 in Latvia. She won the silver medal with the national team at the EuroBasket Women 2011 in Poland and the bronze medal at the EuroBasket Women 2013 held in France.

== Achievements ==
=== Club ===
Botaş

- Ronchetti Cup (Euro Cup)
  - 2nd with Botaş: (2) 2000
- Turkish Youth Championship
  - Winners (2): 1999, 2000
- Turkish Championship
  - Winners (1): 2001
- Turkish Cup
  - Winners (2): 2002, 2003
- Turkish Presidents Cup
  - Winners (2): 2002, 2003

== See also ==
- Turkish women in sports
