= Tarallo =

Tarallo is a surname. Notable people with the surname include:

- Michael Tarallo (born 1967), Italian American United Nations executive
- Luís Tarallo (born 1966), Brazilian basketball coach
- Maria Grazia Tarallo (1866–1912), Italian Roman Catholic nun
- Michele Tarallo (born 1980), Italian footballer
- Stefano Tarallo (born 1976), Italian tennis player

== See also ==
- Taralli
