= Ines Kresović =

Serbian basketball player

Personal information
- Born: 20 February 1984 (age 42) Šibenik, SFR Yugoslavia
- Listed height: 1.82 m (6 ft 0 in)

Career information
- WNBA draft: 2006: undrafted
- Playing career: –2011
- Position: Shooting guard

Career history
- –2005: Crvena zvezda
- 2005–2006: Beşiktaş
- 2006–2007: San Raffaele
- 2007–2008: Pays d'Aix Basket 13
- 2008–2009: Gran Canaria
- 2009–2010: Olesa
- 2010–2011: CDB Zaragoza

Ines Kresović (Serbian Cyrillic: Инес Кресовић, born 20 February 1984 in Šibenik, SFR Yugoslavia) is a Serbian female basketball player.
