= Yasemin Kimyacıoğlu =

Turkish American basketball player

Personal information
- Born: February 26, 1985 (age 41) Mountain View, California U.S.
- Listed height: 5 ft 7 in (1.70 m)

Career information
- High school: Pinewood School (Los Altos, California)
- College: Santa Clara Broncos (2003–2007)
- Position: Guard

Yasemin Kimyacıoğlu Jones (born Yasemin Kimyacıoğlu; February 26, 1985), is a Turkish-American former professional basketball player.

Her sister, Şebnem Kimyacıoğlu, is also a former basketball player. Kimyacıoğlu is a Pinewood High School alum having graduated in 2003, two years after her sister. She was born to Turkish parents in Mountain View, California. She majored in mechanical engineering at Santa Clara.

== Santa Clara statistics ==
Legend
GP	Games played	GS	Games started	MPG	Minutes per game
FG%	Field goal percentage	3P%	3-point field goal percentage	FT%	Free throw percentage
RPG	Rebounds per game	APG	Assists per game	SPG	Steals per game
BPG	Blocks per game	PPG	Points per game	**Bold**	Career high

Year	Team	GP	Points	FG%	3P%	FT%	RPG	APG	SPG	BPG	PPG
2003–04	Santa Clara	27	62	32.9	26.7	33.3	1.3	**0.9**	**0.6**	0.0	**2.3**
2004–05	Santa Clara	**30**	**64**	**33.3**	**30.8**	**100.0**	**1.3**	0.6	0.5	**0.1**	2.1
2005–06	Santa Clara	21	22	30.0	12.5	90.0	0.7	0.1	0.0	–	1.0
2006–07	Santa Clara	29	23	29.2	28.6	71.4	0.8	0.4	0.5	0.0	0.8
Career		107	171	32.2	27.4	78.8	1.1	0.5	0.4	0.0	1.6

== See also ==
- Turkish women in sports
