= Cem Akdağ =

Turkish basketball coach (born 1956)

Eskişehir Basket
- Position: Head coach
- League: Turkish Basketball League

Personal information
- Born: March 18, 1956 (age 70) Samsun, Turkey
- Coaching career: 1994–present

Career history

Coaching
- 1994–1995: Beşiktaş
- 1995: Pınar Karşıyaka
- 1997–2001: Brisa (Women)
- 1999–2007: Turkey
- 2007–2009: Galatasaray (Women)
- 2009–2010: Galatasaray Café Crown
- 2012–2013: Royal Halı Gaziantep
- 2013–2014: Olin Edirne
- 2014–present: Eskişehir Basket

Cem Akdağ (born March 18, 1956) is a Turkish professional basketball coach. He is currently head coach of Eskişehir Basket.
