= Jenaya Wade-Fray =

Bermudian basketball player

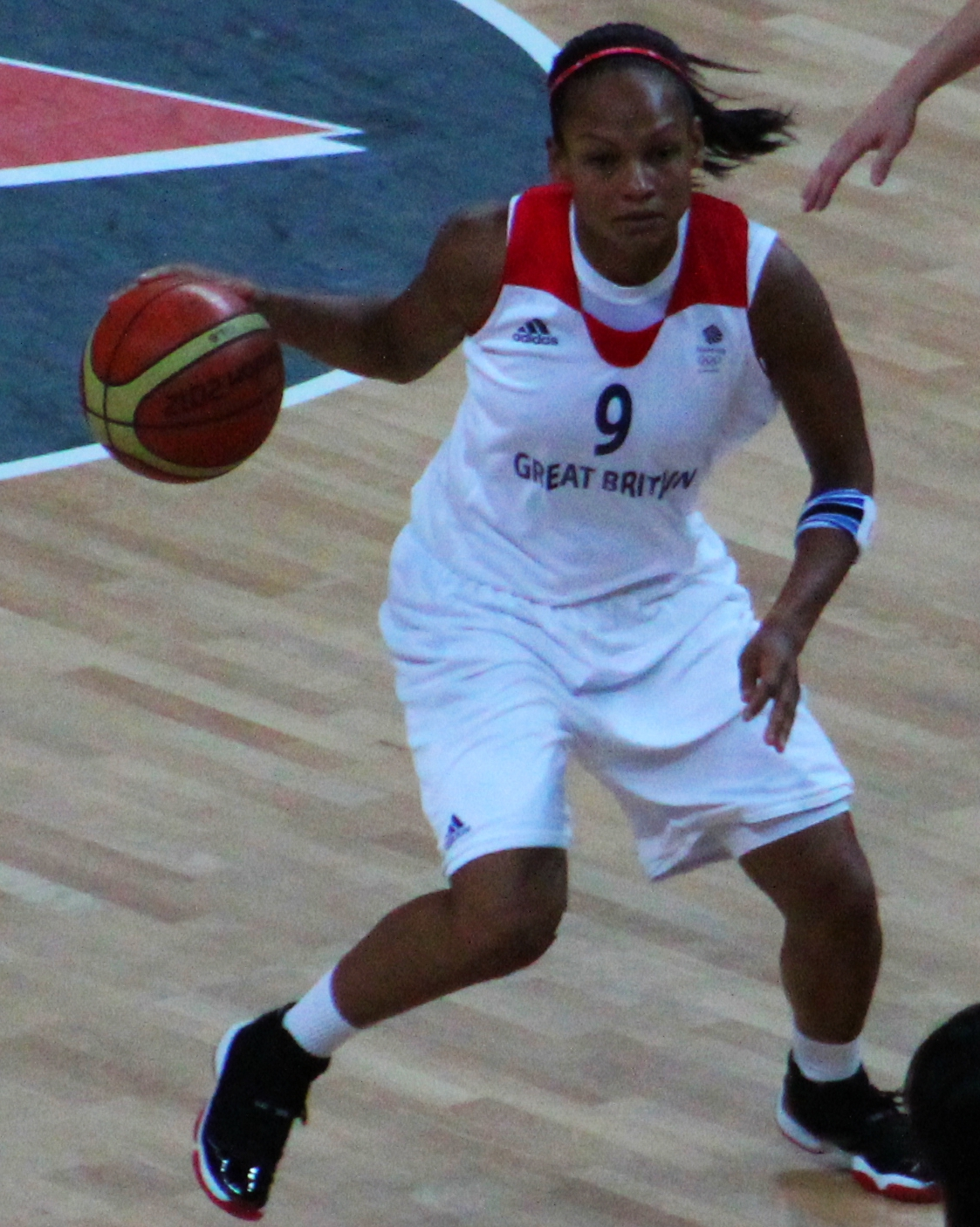

Jenaya Wade-Fray (born 5 September 1988, Spectacle Island) is a Bermudian basketball player for Great Britain women's national basketball team. She was part of the squad for the 2012 Summer Olympics.
