= Melek Bilge =

Turkish basketball player

No. 23 – Bodrum Belediyesi
- Position: Center
- League: Second League of Turkey

Personal information
- Born: March 23, 1989 (age 37) Istanbul, Turkey
- Listed height: 6 ft 4 in (1.93 m)

Career information
- WNBA draft: 2011: undrafted
- Playing career: 2005–present

Career history
- 2005–2008: Migrosspor
- 2008–2010: Beşiktaş Cola Turka
- 2010–2011: Galatasaray Medical Park
- 2011–2012: Mersin BŞB
- 2012: Ceyhan
- 2012–2013: Hatay BSB
- 2013–2014: Orduspor
- 2014–2015: Genclik S.C.
- 2015: S.K. Izmir
- 2016–2017: Bodrum Belediyesi

Melek Bilge (born March 23, 1989, in Istanbul, Turkey) is a Turkish professional basketball player. Melek's parents are Bosniak immigrants from Serbia. She has both Turkish and Serbian citizenship. She currently plays for Bodrum Belediyesi in the Second League of Turkey as a center.

== Career ==
On 21 July 2010, Galatasaray Medical Park announced that Melek had joined the team on a five-year contract.

== Awards and achievements ==
- Turkish Cup Finalist -2006
- Turkish U18 National Team -2006-2007
- Turkish National Team -2008
- Turkish U20 National Team -2008
- European Championships U20 in Chieti (ITA) -2008
- Qualifications to European Championships 2009: 5 games: 2.4ppg, 1.4rpg
- European Championships in Latvia -2009: 3 games: 0.7ppg
