= Ceyhun Yıldızoğlu =

Turkish basketball coach

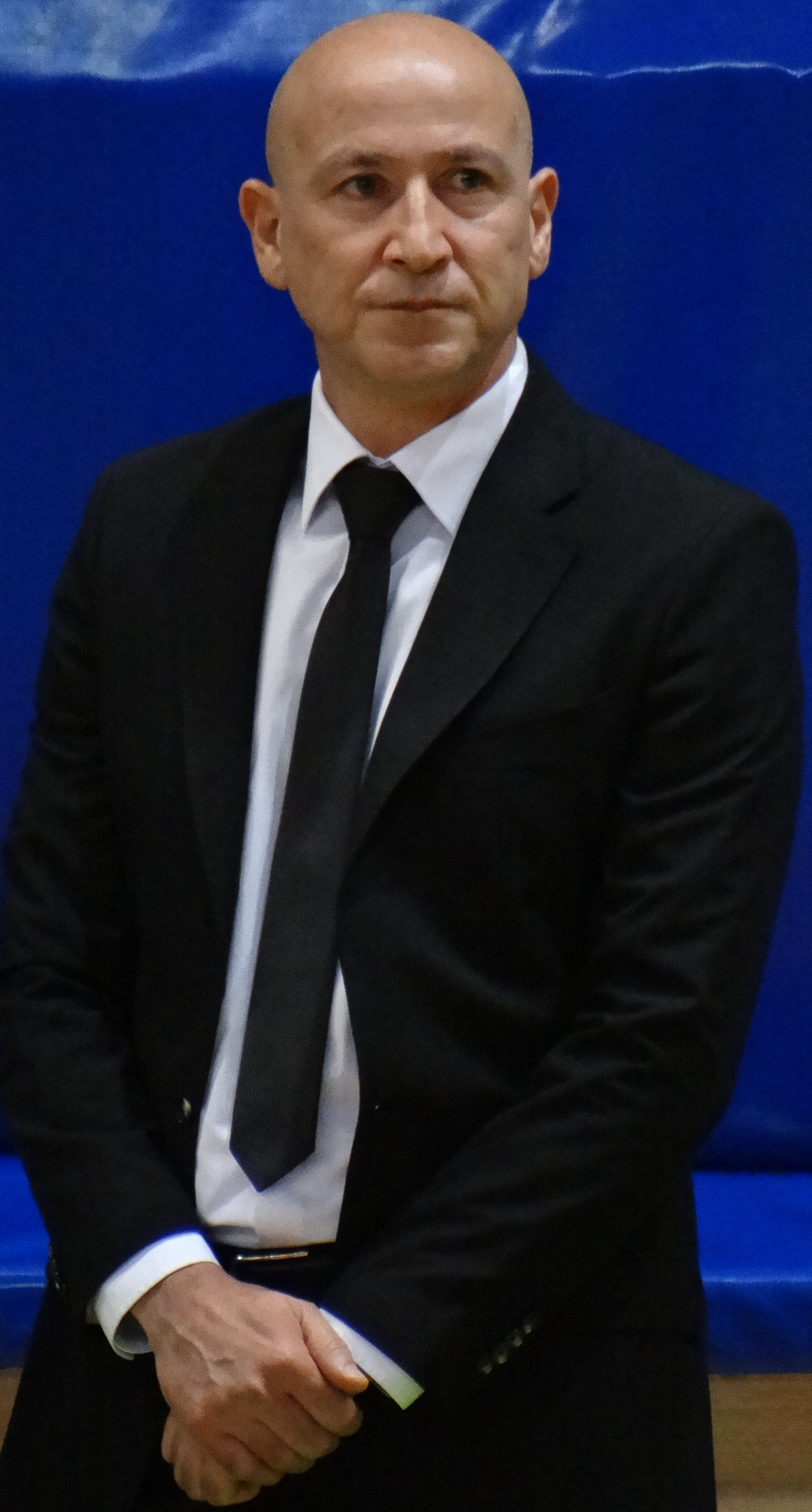

ÇBK Mersin
- Position: Head Coach

Personal information
- Born: March 6, 1967 (age 59) Eskişehir, Turkey

Career information
- Playing career: 1989–present

Career history
- 1989-2008: Botaş Spor
- 2008–2010: Mersin Büyükşehir Belediyesi
- 2008–2015: Turkey
- 2010–2012: Galatasaray Medical Park
- 2012–2014: Mersin Büyükşehir Belediyesi
- 2014–2017: Botaş Spor
- 2017: Bornova Beckerspor
- 2017–2020: Çukurova Basketbol
- 2019–2022: Turkey
- 2026–present: ÇBK Mersin

Ceyhun Yıldızoğlu (born 6 March 1967) is a Turkish professional basketball coach. He is currently coaching the Turkish pro side ÇBK Mersin.

== Managing career ==
=== National level ===
- 2008–2015 Turkey
- 2018–2022 Turkey

== Honors ==
- Turkish Women's Basketball League
  - Winner (2): 2000-01, 2002–03
  - Runner-up (2): 2008-09, 2010–11
- Turkish Women's President Cup
  - Winner (4): 2002-03, 2003–04, 2008–09, 2010–11
  - Runner-up (1): 2009-10
- Ronchetti Cup
  - Runner-up (1): 2001
- Eurobasket Women
  - Runner-up (1): Eurobasket 2011
  - Third place (1):Eurobasket 2013
