= Nilay Kartaltepe =

Turkish basketball player

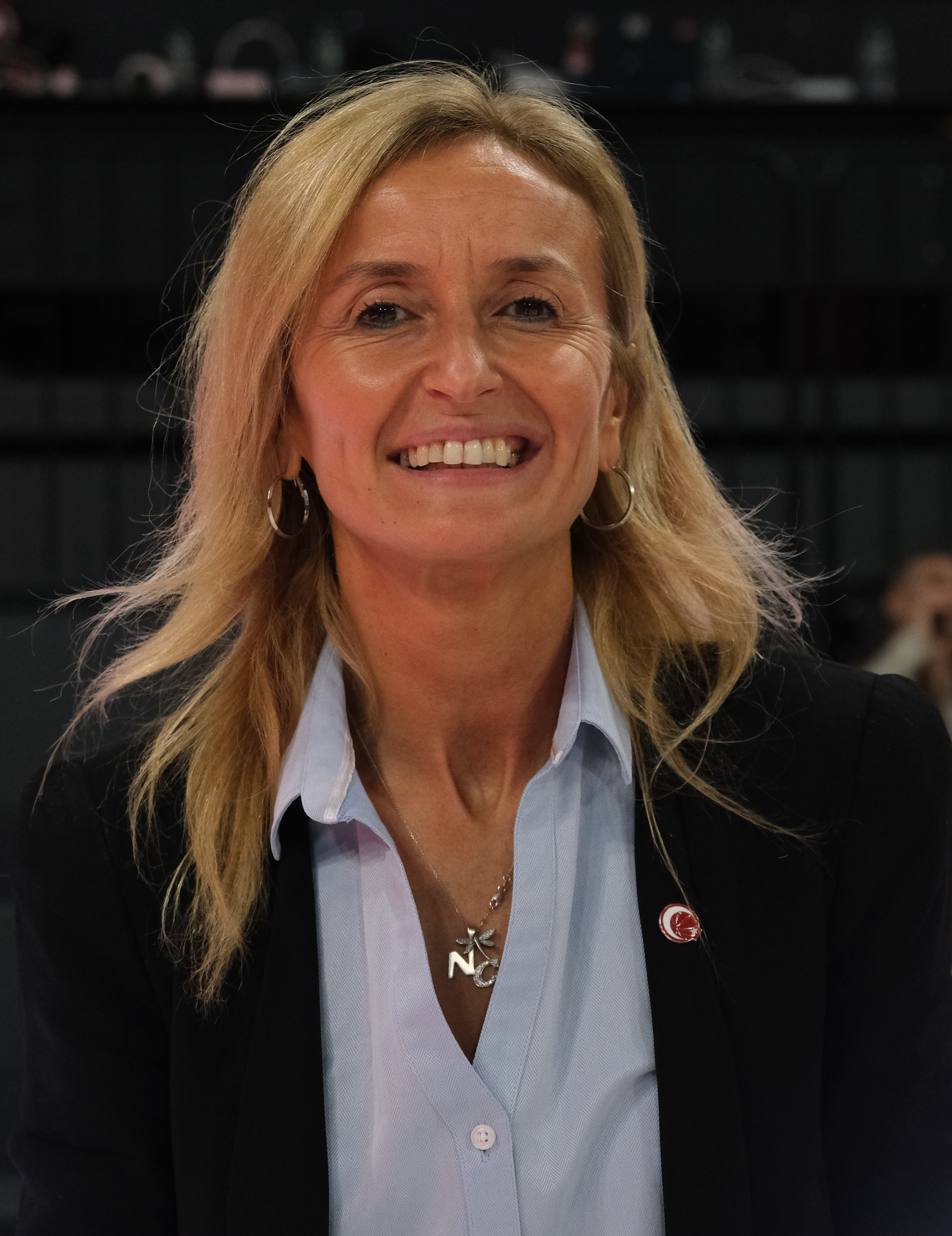

Personal information
- Born: 13 January 1979 (age 47) Bakırköy, Istanbul, Turkey
- Listed height: 5 ft 7 in (1.70 m)
- Listed weight: 121 lb (55 kg)

Career information
- Playing career: 1996–present
- Position: Point guard
- Number: 7

Career history
- 1996–1998: İstanbul Üniversitesi
- 1998–2000: Erdemirspor
- 2000–2001: Beşiktaş
- 2001–2007: Fenerbahçe
- 2007–2008: Beşiktaş
- 2008–2009: Panküp TED Kayseri Koleji
- 2009–2010: Galatasaray
- 2010–2011: Beşiktaş
- 2011–2012: BOTAŞ
- 2012–2014: İstanbul Üniversitesi
- 2014–2016: Adana ASKİ
- 2016–2017: Mersin Büyükşehir Belediyespor
- 2017: Abdullah Gül Üniversitesi
- 2018: Adana ASKİ
- 2018–2022: Ormanspor

Career highlights
- 4× Turkish Super League champion (2002, 2004, 2006, 2007); 3× Turkish Presidential Cup champion (2004, 2005, 2007); 5× Turkish Cup champion (2004, 2005, 2006, 2007, 2010)

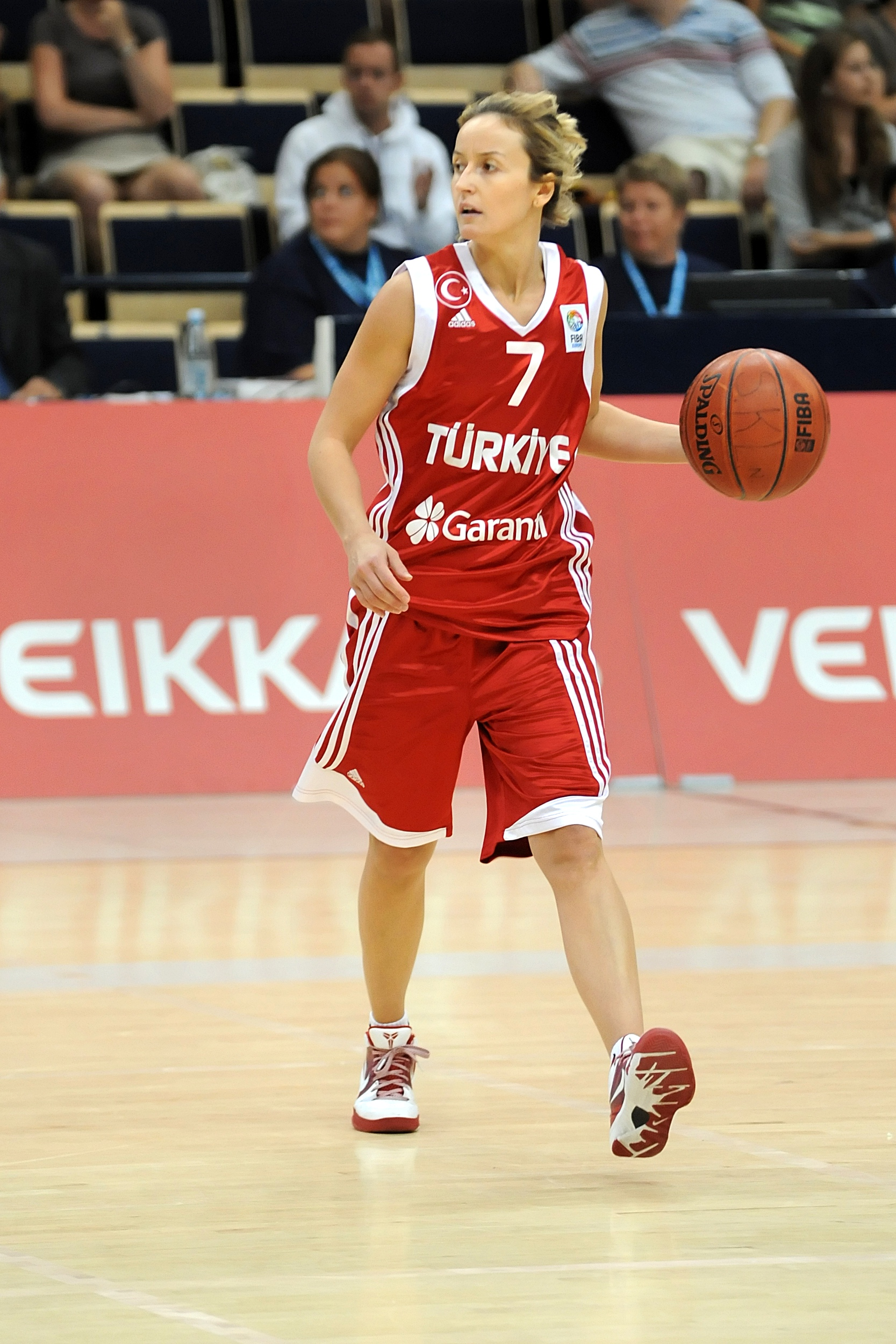
Nilay Yiğit with national team

Nilay Kartaltepe (born 13 January 1979 in Bakırköy, Istanbul) is a former Turkish professional basketball player who played for a number of teams in the Turkish Basketball Super League throughout her career. After her retirement as a player, she was named Director of Women's National Teams of the Turkish Basketball Federation.

== International career ==
She was a member of the national team, which won the gold medal at the 2005 Mediterranean Games in Almería, Spain and the silver medal at EuroBasket 2011 in Poland.

== Honors ==
- Turkish Women's Basketball League
  - Winners (4): 2002, 2004, 2006, 2007
  - Runners-up (1): 2010
- Turkish Cup
  - Winners (5): 2004, 2005, 2006, 2007, 2010
- Turkish Presidential Cup
  - Winners (3): 2004, 2005, 2007

== Personal life ==
Nilay Kartaltepe is married to former national volleyball player Cengizhan Kartaltepe since 2010.
