= Gülşah Gümüşay =

Turkish basketball player (born 1989)

Dürdane Gülşah Gümüşay
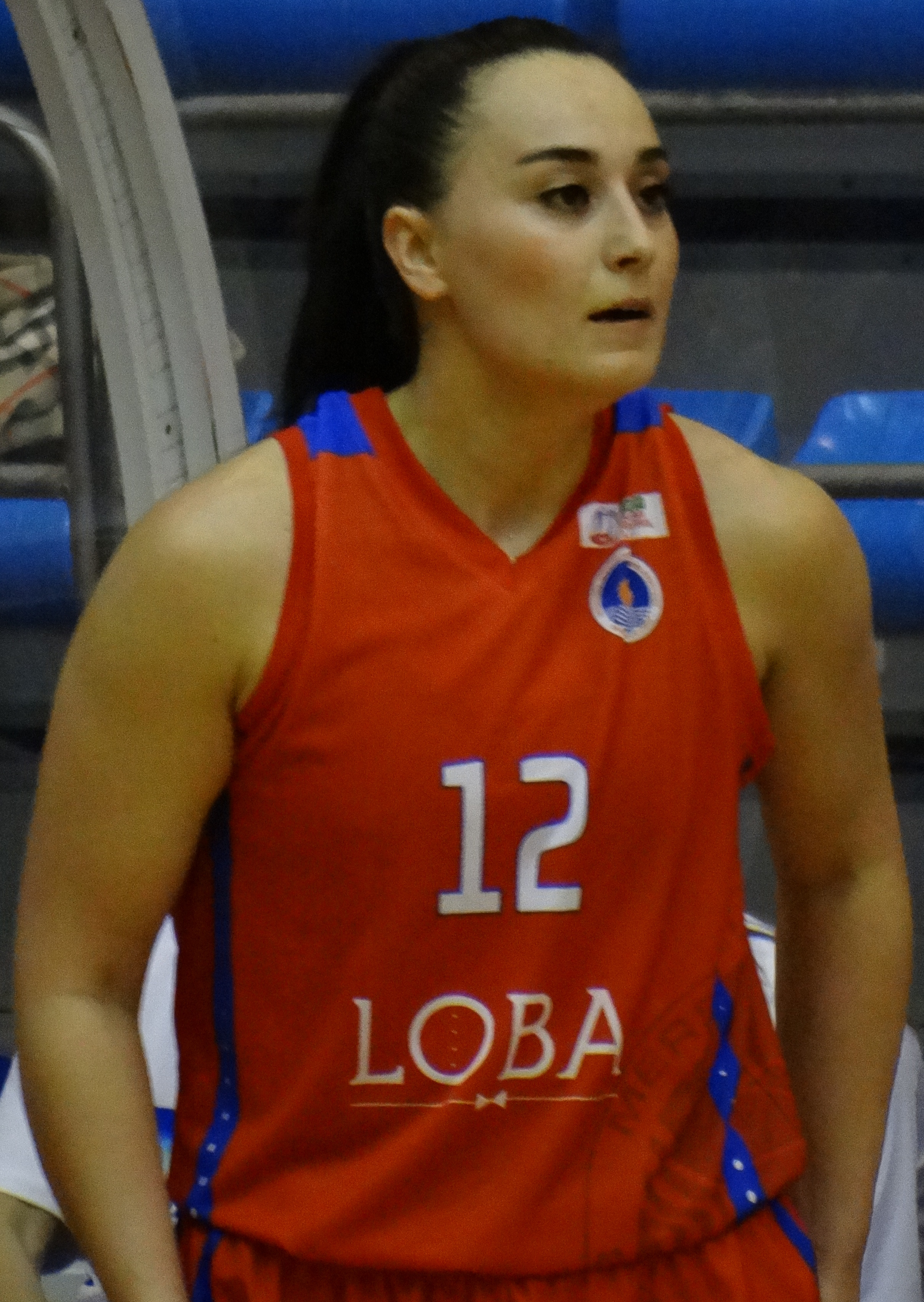

Galatasaray Medical Park
- Positions: Small forward, shooting guard
- League: Turkish Women's Basketball League

Personal information
- Born: February 22, 1989 (age 37) Adana, Turkey
- Listed height: 5 ft 11 in (1.80 m)

Career information
- Playing career: 2008–present

Career history
- 1998–2010: Botaş Spor
- 2010–present: Galatasaray Medical Park

Dürdane Gülşah Gümüşay (born February 22, 1989, in Adana, Turkey) is a Turkish professional female basketball player. She is a small forward playing for Galatasaray Medical Park.

== Awards and achievements ==
- Turkish U18 National Team -2005, -2007
- European Championships U18 -2005
- Turkish TBBL Semifinals -2006, -2007
- European Championships U18 in Tenerife (ESP) -2006: 7 games: 13.1ppg, 2.4rpg, 1.7apg, 1.0spg, 2FGP: 50%, 3FGP: 31.6%, FT: 57.1%
- Turkish National Team -2008
- Turkish TBBL All-Star Game -2008
- Turkish Cup Finalist -2008
- European Championships in Latvia -2009: 6 games: 3.5ppg, 1.3rpg
- Turkish U20 National Team -2009
- European Championships U20 in Gdynia (Poland) -2009: 8 games: 15.8ppg, 5.0rpg, 2.0apg, 1.6spg, FGP: 36.7%, 3PT: 34.5%, FT: 87.5%

== See also ==
- Turkish women in sports
