= Luís Tarallo =

Brazilian basketball coach

Luís Cláudio Cicchetto Tarallo (born 27 May 1966) is a Brazilian basketball coach.

At the 2012 Summer Olympics he coached the Brazil women's national basketball team.
