= Didem Sarıca =

Turkish basketball player

Personal information
- Born: March 4, 1977 (age 49) İzmir, Turkey
- Listed height: 1.88 m (6 ft 2 in)

Career information
- Playing career: 199?–2014
- Position: Power forward / small forward

Career history
- 2006-2007: Mersin Büyükşehir Belediyesi
- 2007-2008: Galatasaray S.K.
- 2008-2009: Basket Tarsus
- 2009-2010: Adana Botaş
- 2010-2011: TED Ankara
- 2011-2013: Canik
- 2013-2014: Konak Belediyespor

Didem Sarıca, married Süer, (born March 4, 1977) is a former Turkish female professional basketball player.

== Career ==
She began her career at İzmir Büyükşehir Belediyespor. During the 1999–2000 season, she won the Turkish Women's Basketball League championship with Güre Belediyespor. Ahead of the 2000–01 season, she transferred to BOTAŞ, where in her first season she won both the Turkish Women's Basketball League (now the Women's Basketball Super League) and the Turkish Women's Basketball Cup, and finished as runner-up in the FIBA Ronchetti Cup.

== See also ==
- Turkish women in sports
