= Şebnem Kimyacıoğlu =

Turkish-American basketball player

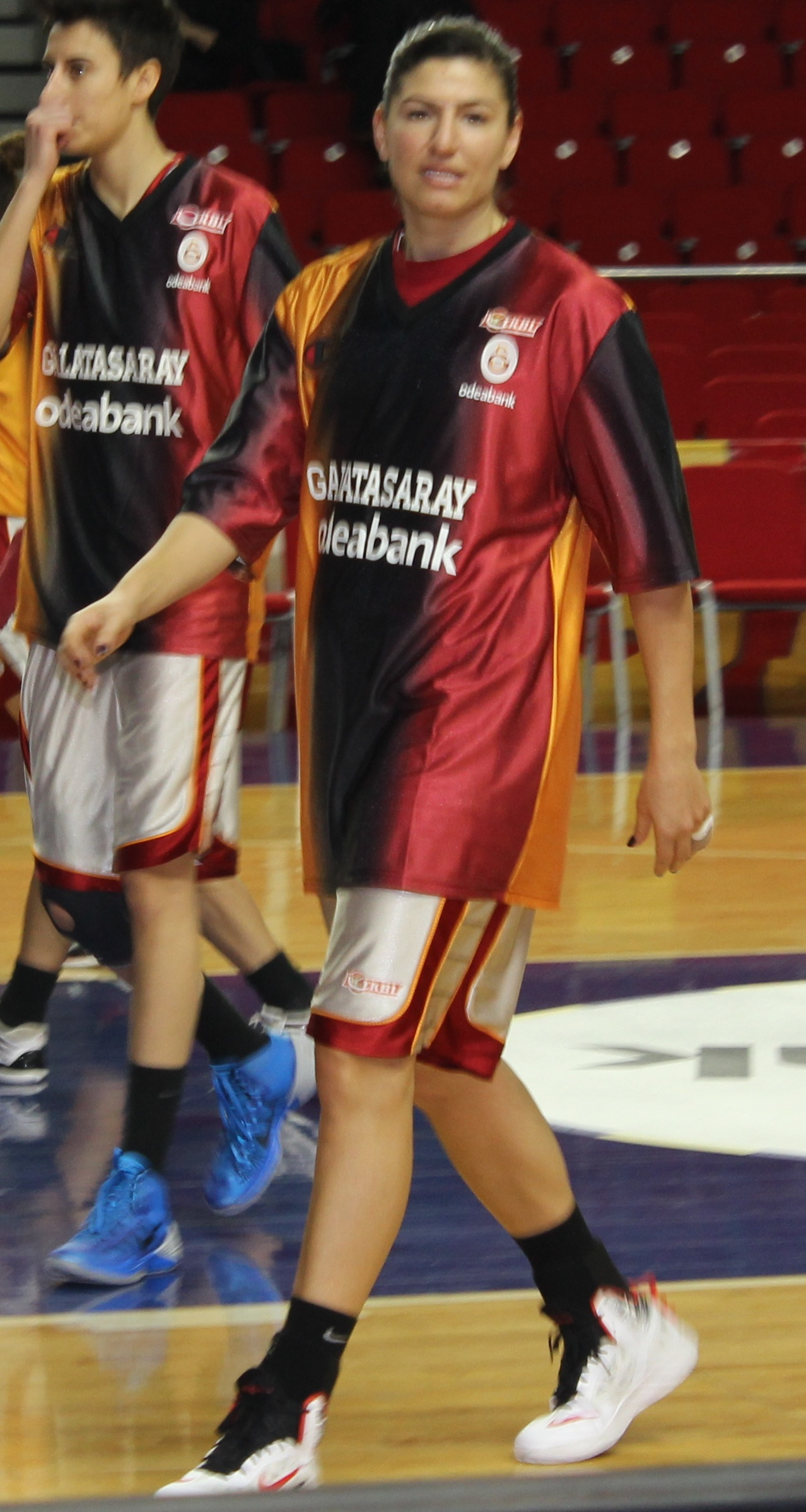

Personal information
- Born: June 14, 1983 (age 43) Santa Clara, California U.S.
- Listed height: 6 ft 0 in (1.83 m)

Career information
- High school: Pinewood School (Los Altos, California)
- College: Stanford (2001–2005)
- Playing career: 2005–2016
- Position: Power forward

Career history
- 2005–2007: Beşiktaş
- 2007–2008, 2012–2015: Galatasaray
- 2016: Yakın Doğu Üniversitesi

Career highlights
- EuroLeague champion (2014); 2× Turkish Super League champion (2014, 2015); 2× Turkish Cup winner (2013, 2014)

Şebnem Nehazat Kimyacıoğlu (born June 14, 1983) is a Turkish-American former professional basketball player. She is an alumna of Pinewood High School in California and graduated from Stanford University before returning to Turkey.

Şebnem's sister, Yasemin Kimyacıoğlu, is also a former basketball player.

== Early life and high school career ==
Kimyacıoğlu was born in 1983 in Mountain View in California. She grew up in a Turkish community in California. Her parents, Kursat and Fusun Kimyacioglu, came from Turkey in 1980 when her father, an electrical engineer, was recruited to a Silicon Valley semiconductor company. They would spend summers in her mother's hometown of Alanya to connect with their culture.

Kimyacıoğlu began playing basketball in her elementary years, playing against her male classmates. When she was in the fourth grade, a teacher noticed her skill and recommended to her parents that she join a team. In high school, she joined Pinewood School's varsity team. With her, they won four Central Coast Section Division V titles.

== Playing career ==
=== Stanford ===
With the Stanford Cardinal, they finished 32–3 in her senior year, made the Elite Eight twice in the NCAA Division I tournament and won four Pac-10 championships. In her NCAA career, she made 205 threes, the third-most in the program's history at the time of her graduation. She graduated with an economics degree in 2005.

=== Beşiktaş ===
Kimyacıoğlu first played for Beşiktaş in the Turkish Basketball League from 2005–2007. She played for them for a season and a half.

=== Galatasaray ===
Kimyacıoğlu then played for Galatarasay for one season, but a plantar fascia injury made her stop playing. She then studied law for four years.

In 2012, Kimyacıoğlu was convinced to play basketball after a pickup basketball game against her Stanford teammate Kristen Newlin. Newlin's husband, an assistant coach in Turkey, encouraged her to try out for Galatarasay, as they needed non-foreign players. While studying for her bar exam, she got back into shape. She then made the Galatarasay roster a month later. After her contract was renewed for one year in 2013, she became a contributor during their title run in the 2013–14 season. In the Euroleague semis, they upset the defending champion UMMC Ekaterinburg. In the final against Fenerbahçe, she made two clutch three-pointers that secured them the championship. Her contract with the team was renewed for one year after that season.

=== Yakın Doğu Üniversitesi ===
In 2016, Yakın Doğu Üniversitesi (YDU) convinced Kimyacıoğlu to unretire and play for them. YDU was a team based in Northern Cyprus that was in a conflict zone featuring Cypriot Greeks and Cypriot Turks. She joined the team as it related to work she wanted to do in the future. She stepped in as the team captain when Aslı Sevinç left the team.

== National team career ==
In 2016, Kimyacıoğlu made the Turkish national basketball team roster. They qualified that year for the 2016 Rio Olympics, only the second time in Turkish women's basketball history. They made it to the quarterfinals, where they lost on a buzzer-beater to Spain. She retired after playing in the Olympics.

== Legal career ==
When Kimyacıoğlu suffered an injury in 2008, she used her recovery time to begin studying law at Santa Clara University. She retired from playing basketball for four years and completed her bar exam in California. She also pursued a coaching career during her four years of studying law, serving as the director of the Bay Area Basketball Academy while working for different law firms. When she resumed playing basketball, she would practice law during the off-season.

After retiring from playing basketball, she continued practicing law and became a lawyer for Marvel Entertainment's general counsel.

== Personal life ==
Born in the US, Kimyacıoğlu is a dual citizen of both the US and Turkey. Şebnem's younger sister, Yasemin, is also a former basketball player while her older sister Elif played basketball in high school.

== Career statistics ==
Legend
GP	Games played	GS	Games started	MPG	Minutes per game
FG%	Field goal percentage	3P%	3-point field goal percentage	FT%	Free throw percentage
RPG	Rebounds per game	APG	Assists per game	SPG	Steals per game
BPG	Blocks per game	PPG	Points per game	**Bold**	Career high

=== College ===
Year	Team	GP	Points	FG%	3P%	FT%	RPG	APG	SPG	BPG	PPG
2001–02	Stanford	**35**	208	**43.4**	**42.4**	77.3	2.0	**2.2**	0.7	**0.4**	5.9
2002–03	Stanford	32	**270**	38.9	39.5	78.3	1.5	2.2	0.6	0.2	**8.4**
2003–04	Stanford	34	229	31.6	33.5	74.3	**3.0**	1.9	0.9	0.3	6.7
2004–05	Stanford	**35**	184	38.1	35.0	**78.8**	2.9	1.9	**1.0**	0.1	5.3
Career		136	891	37.5	37.3	77.0	2.4	2.0	0.8	0.3	6.6

== See also ==
- Turkish women in sports
