= Yasemin Horasan =

Turkish basketball player

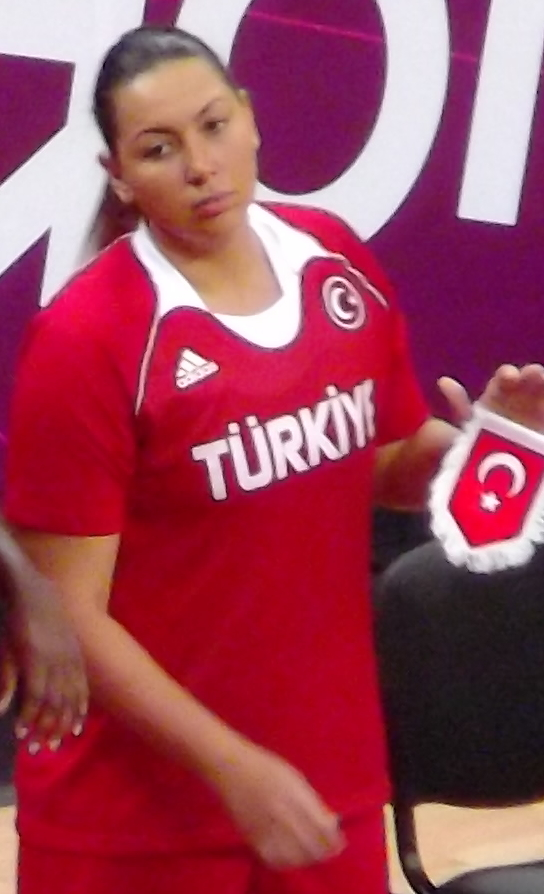

Personal information
- Born: 1 August 1983 (age 43) Istanbul, Turkey
- Listed height: 6 ft 2 in (1.88 m)
- Listed weight: 192 lb (87 kg)

Career information
- Playing career: 1997–2016
- Position: Center

Career history

Playing
- 1997–2007: Beşiktaş
- 2007–2008: Napoli Basket Vomero
- 2008–2010: Galatasaray
- 2010–2012: Beşiktaş
- 2012–2013: Fenerbahçe
- 2013–2014: Beşiktaş
- 2014–2016: Basketbolu Geliştirenler Derneği
- 2016: Beşiktaş

Yasemin Horasan (born 1 August 1983) is a Turkish former professional basketball player. She is currently the general manager of the Turkish national team.

== Career ==
Horasan played in the 2002–2003 season for Beşiktaş J.K. and was elected Most Valuable Player of Turkish Women's Basketball League including all domestic and foreign players. To improve her technique, she was sent by her club to IMG Academy in Bradenton, Florida, U.S., the best-known multi-sport training facility in the world.

Horasan was member of the gold medal-winning Turkish team at the 2005 Mediterranean Games in Almería, Spain. She won the Turkish women's championship with Beşiktaş in 2004–2005.

== Honors ==
- Turkish Women's Basketball League
  - Winners (2): 2004-05, 2012–13
  - Runners-up (1): 2009-10
- Turkish Cup
  - Winners (1): 2009-10
- Turkish Presidents Cup
  - Winners (1): 2006-07
- EuroLeague Women
  - Runners-up (1): 2013
- EuroCup Women
  - Winners (1): 2008-09
- FIBA SuperCup
  - Runners-up (1): 2009

== See also ==
- Turkish women in sports
