= Işıl Alben =

Turkish basketball player (born 1986)

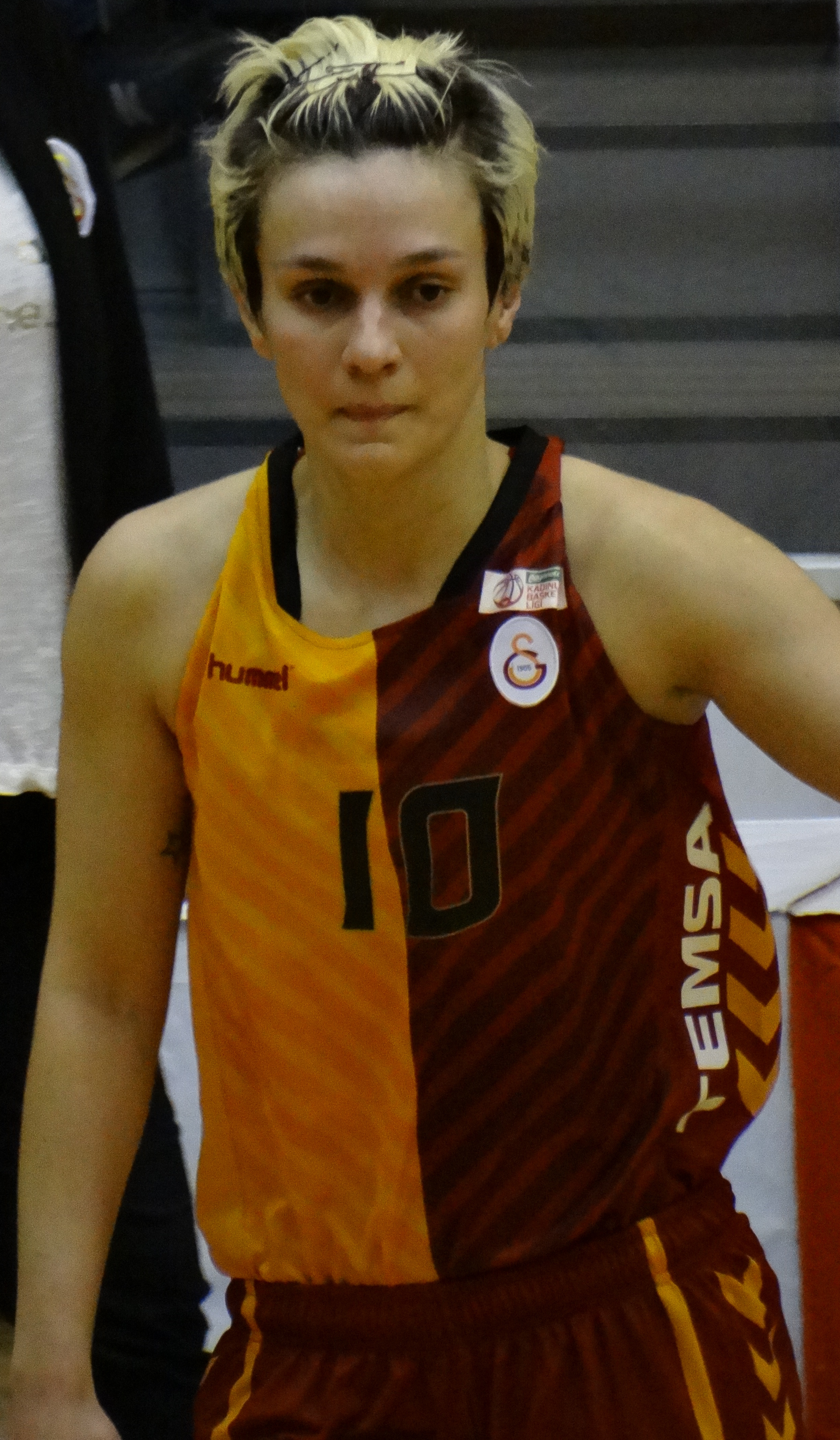

Galatasaray
- Title: General coordinator
- League: Women's Basketball Super League; EuroCup Women

Personal information
- Born: 22 February 1986 (age 40) Istanbul, Turkey
- Listed height: 1.72 m (5 ft 8 in)
- Listed weight: 60 kg (132 lb)

Career information
- Playing career: 1998–2023
- Position: Point guard

Career history

Playing
- 1998–2006: İstanbul Üniversitesi
- 2006–2007: Botaş
- 2007–2014: Galatasaray
- 2014–2015: Dynamo Kursk
- 2015–2020: Galatasaray
- 2020–2022: Botaş
- 2022–2023: Galatasaray

Coaching
- 2023–: Galatasaray (General Coordinator)

Career highlights
- EuroLeague champion (2014); 2× EuroCup champion (2009, 2018); Turkish Super League champion (2014); 5× Turkish Cup champion (2010, 2011, 2012, 2013, 2014); 2× Turkish Super Cup champion (2008, 2011); Russian Cup champion (2015)
Medals
EuroBasket
Silver medal – second place	2011 Poland	Team
Bronze medal – third place	2013 France	Team

Işıl Alben (born 22 February 1986) is a Turkish retired professional basketball player, who is often considered to be among the top Turkish female athletes. She was the captain of the first Turkish team that won the EuroLeague title in 2014.

On 3 June 2023, Alben announced her retirement as a professional basketball player.

== Career history ==
Pro club

- 1998–2002 İstanbul Üniversitesi SK (Youth)
- 2002–2006 İstanbul Üniversitesi SK
- 2006–2007 Botaş SK
- 2007–2014 Galatasaray SK
- 2014–2015 Dynamo Kursk
- 2015–2020 Galatasaray SK
- 2020–2022 Botaş SK
- 2022–2023 Galatasaray SK (c)

Turkey national team

- 2003–2005 U18 National Team
- 2005–2007 U20 National Team
- 2007–2023 National Team (c)

== Honors ==
EuroLeague

- Winners: 2013–14
- Third place: 2014–15

EuroCup

- Winners: 2008–09, 2017–18
- Third place: 2007–08

Turkish Super League

- Winners: 2013–14

Turkish Cup

- Winners: 2009–10, 2010–11, 2011–12, 2012–13, 2013–14

Turkish Super Cup

- Winners: 2008, 2011

Russian Cup

- Winners: 2014–15

2011 EuroBasket

- Second place

2013 EuroBasket

- Third place

2012 Olympics: London

- Fifth place

2016 Olympics: Rio

- Sixth place

2014 FIBA World Cup

- Fourth place

== Injuries ==
She suffered three major ACL injuries, including both knees in 2008–2009, 2009–2010, 2020–2021 seasons.

== Post-playing career ==
On 18 July 2023, she was appointed as the General Coordinator of the Galatasaray Women's Basketball Team.
