= Tuğba Palazoğlu =

Turkish basketball player

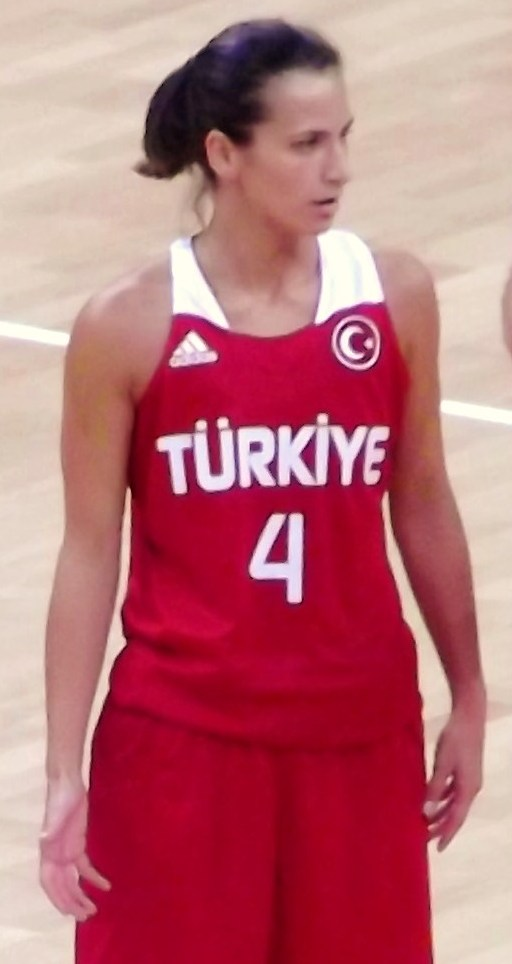

Personal information
- Born: 4 December 1980 (age 45) Bolu, Turkey
- Listed height: 5 ft 7 in (1.70 m)
- Listed weight: 132 lb (60 kg)

Career information
- College: Barton CC (1999–2001); Western Illinois (2001–2003)
- Playing career: 1997–2016
- Position: Shooting guard

Career history
- 1997–1999: MTA Ankara
- 2003: Chicago Blaze
- 2003–2004: Migrosspor
- 2004–2005: Beşiktaş Cola Turka
- 2005–2006: Ceyhan Belediye
- 2006–2007: Beşiktaş Cola Turka
- 2007–2008: Mersin BB
- 2008–2011: Galatasaray
- 2011–2012: Mersin BB
- 2012–2014: Istanbul University B.K.
- 2014–2015: Fenerbahçe
- 2015–2016: Adana Aski

Emine Tuğba Palazoğlu (born 4 December 1980) is a Turkish former professional basketball player.

== Honors ==
Galatasaray

- Turkish Presidents Cup
  - Winners (1): 2008
- EuroCup Women
  - Winners (1): 2008–2009

Fenerbahçe

- Turkish Presidents Cup
  - Winners (1): 2014
- Turkish Cup
  - Winners (1): 2015
