= Bahar Çağlar =

Turkish basketball player (born 1988)

- Bahar Çağlar

Personal information
- Born: 28 September 1988 (age 38) İzmir, Turkey
- Listed height: 6 ft 3 in (1.91 m)
- Listed weight: 168 lb (76 kg)

Career information
- WNBA draft: 2010: undrafted
- Playing career: 2005–2023
- Position: Small forward

Career history
- 2005–2008: Ceyhan Belediyespor
- 2008–2016: Galatasaray
- 2016–2018: Yakın Doğu Üniversitesi
- 2018–2020: Beşiktaş
- 2020–2021: Botaş
- 2021–2022: Hatayspor
- 2022–2023: Emlak Konut SK
Medals
EuroBasket
Silver medal – second place	2011 Poland	Team
Bronze medal – third place	2013 France	Team

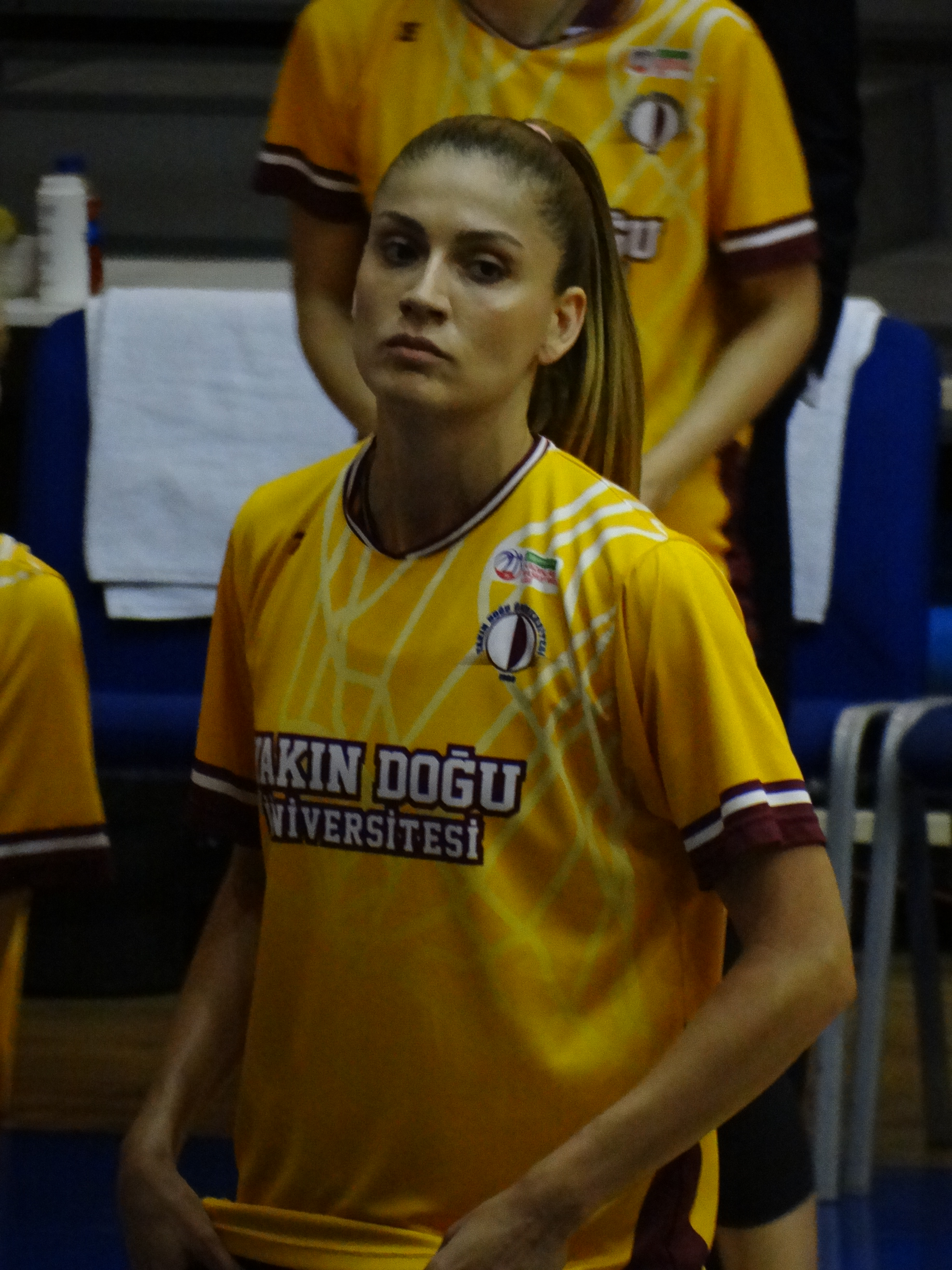
Çağlar in 2018

Bahar Çağlar Ökten (born 28 September 1988) is a Turkish retired professional basketball player. She competed at two Summer Olympic Games: the 2012 and 2016. She has been married to the advocate Emin Ökten since 29 August 2020.

== Honors ==
- Galatasaray
  - EuroLeague Women
    - Winners: 2013–2014
  - EuroCup Women
    - Winners: 2008–2009
  - Turkish Basketball Super League
    - Winners: 2013–2014, 2014–2015
  - Turkish Cup
    - Winners: 2009–2010, 2010–2011, 2011–2012, 2012–2013, 2013–2014
  - Turkish Presidents Cup
    - Winners: 2008, 2011
- Yakın Doğu Üniversitesi
  - EuroCup Women
    - Winners: 2016–2017
  - Turkish Basketball Super League
    - Winners: 2016–2017
  - Turkish Cup
    - Winners: 2016–2017, 2017–2018
  - Turkish Presidents Cup
    - Winners: 2017

== See also ==
- Turkish women in sports
