= Şaziye İvegin =

Turkish basketball player

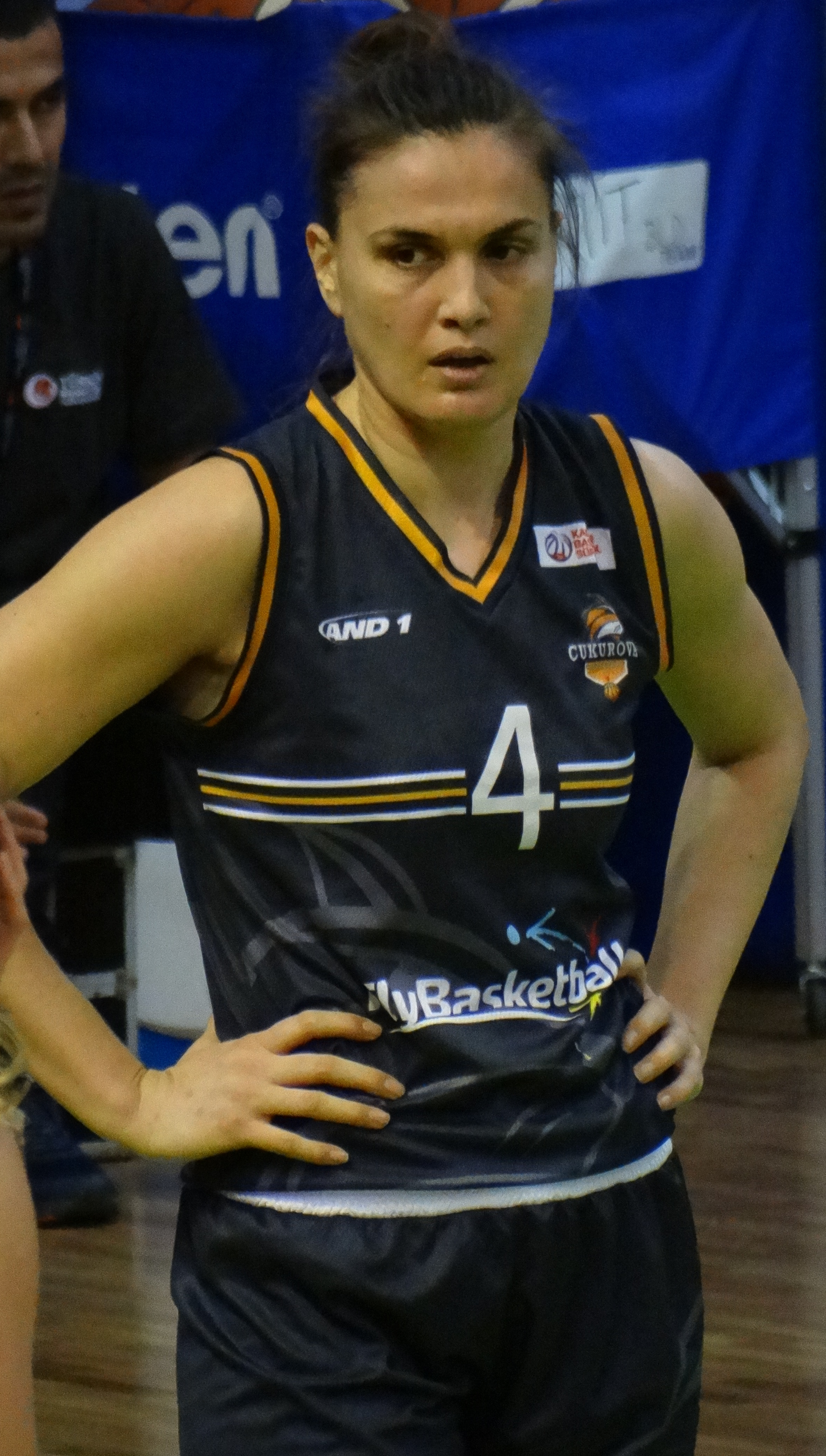

Personal information
- Born: 8 February 1982 (age 44) Adana, Turkey
- Listed height: 5 ft 11 in (1.80 m)
- Listed weight: 152 lb (69 kg)

Career information
- Playing career: 2000–2019
- Position: Small forward

Career history

Playing
- 2000–2004: Botaşspor
- 2004–2007: Fenerbahçe
- 2007: Montigarda Basket
- 2007–2008: Beşiktaş
- 2008: Spartak Moscow
- 2008–2009: Galatasaray
- 2009–2010: Mersin Büyükşehir Belediyespor
- 2010–2011: Fenerbahçe
- 2011–2013: Galatasaray
- 2013–2015: İstanbul Üniversitesi
- 2015–2016: Beşiktaş
- 2016–2017: İstanbul Üniversitesi
- 2017: Abdullah Gül Üniversitesi
- 2017–2018: Adana ASKİ
- 2018–2019: Çukurova Basketbol

Coaching
- 2024–2025: Fenerbahçe Gelişim
- 2025–present: Fenerbahçe Gelişim (assistant)

Şaziye İvegin Üner (born 8 February 1982) is a Turkish former professional basketball player. She currently works as Fenerbahçe Women's Basketball Academy assistant coach.

A basketball player's daughter, İvegin started basketball in 7th school class on the same day together with her two younger sisters. The three sisters played in the Adana-based club Botaş SK and twice won the Turkish Girls’ Basketball League championship title. At age 22, she became the youngest women's basketball team captain in the country. After 10 successful years with Botaş, İvegin transferred to Fenerbahçe on May 7, 2004.

İvegin was member of the Turkish national team that won the gold medal at the 2005 Mediterranean Games in Almería, Spain.

She is a student of business administration at the Anadolu University.

== Achievements ==
Botaş

- (European Union) Ronchetti Cup runner-up: 2001
- (Turkey) Turkish Basketball Super League: 2001, 2003
- (Turkey) Turkish Cup: 2002, 2003
- (Turkey) Turkish Presidential Cup: 2003
- (Turkey) Turkish Youth Championship: 1999, 2000

Fenerbahçe

- (European Union) EuroCup Women runner-up: 2005
- (Turkey) Turkish Basketball Super League: 2006, 2007, 2011
- (Turkey) Turkish Cup: 2005, 2006, 2007
- (Turkey) Turkish Presidential Cup: 2004, 2005, 2007, 2010

Spartak Moscow

- (European Union) EuroLeague Women:2008
- (Russia) Russian Women's Basketball Premier League: 2008

Galatasaray

- (European Union) EuroCup Women: 2009
- (Turkey) Turkish Cup: 2012, 2013
- (Turkey) Turkish Presidential Cup: 2008, 2011

=== Turkey National ===
- 2000 FIBA Europe Under-20 Championship for Women 4th with Turkey women's national under-20 basketball team
- 2005 Mediterranean Games gold medal with Turkey women's national basketball team

== See also ==
- Turkish women in sports
