= 2006–07 WABA NBL =

- League: WABA NBL
- Sport: Basketball
- Number of games: 114
- Number of teams: 12

2006–07
- Season champions: (Bulgaria) CSKA Sofia (1st title)
- Season MVP: (United States) Latasha Byears

WABA League seasons
- ← 2005–06 2007–08 →

WABA NBL for season 2006–07 was the sixth season of WABA League. The study included twelve teams from five countries, a champion for the first time in team history became CSKA Sofia. In this season participating clubs from Serbia, Montenegro, Bosnia and Herzegovina, Croatia, Slovenia and from Bulgaria.

== Team information ==
Country	Teams	Team	City	Venue (Capacity)
Croatia	3			
Croatia	3	Gospić Croatia Osiguranje	Gospić	Gradska Školska Sportska Dvorana (2,000)
Croatia	3	Šibenik Jolly	Šibenik	Dvorana Baldekin (1,500)
Croatia	3	Ragusa Dubrovnik	Dubrovnik	Športska dvorana Gospino polje (1,400)
Montenegro	3			
Montenegro	3	Budućnost	Podgorica	Morača Sports Center (4,570)
Montenegro	3	Jedinstvo	Bijelo Polje	Nikoljac (2,000)
Montenegro	3	Herceg Novi	Herceg Novi	
Bosnia and Herzegovina	2			
Bosnia and Herzegovina	2	Željezničar Sarajevo	Sarajevo	Mala dvorana KSC Skenderija (800)
Bosnia and Herzegovina	2	Jablanica		
Serbia	2			
Serbia	2	Vojvodina NIS	Novi Sad	SPC Vojvodina (1,030)
Serbia	2	Crvena zvezda	Belgrade	Basket City Hall (1,600)
Slovenia	1			
Slovenia	1	Merkur Celje	Celje	Dvorana Gimnazije Celje - Center (1,500)
Bulgaria	1			
Bulgaria	1	CSKA Sofia	Sofia	Universiada Hall (3,000)

== Regular season ==
The League of the season was played with 12 teams and play a dual circuit system, each with each one game at home and away. The four best teams at the end of the regular season were placed in the Final Four.

Place	Team	Pld	W	L	PF	PA	Diff	Pts	
1.	(Croatia) Šibenik Jolly	20	18	2	1550	1265	+285	38	Final Four
2.	Gospić Croatia Osiguranje	20	17	3	1544	1321	+223	37	Final Four
3.	(Bulgaria) CSKA Sofia	20	14	6	1547	1329	+218	34	Final Four
4.	(Bosnia and Herzegovina) Željezničar Sarajevo	20	13	7	1485	1471	+14	33	Final Four
5.	(Slovenia) Merkur Celje	20	11	9	1313	1317	-4	31	
6.	(Montenegro) Budućnost	20	9	11	1367	1370	-3	29	
7.	(Montenegro) Jedinstvo	20	7	13	1282	1378	-96	27	
8.	(Croatia) Ragusa Dubrovnik	20	7	13	1484	1568	-84	27	
9.	(Serbia) Vojvodina NIS	20	7	13	1508	1598	-90	27	
10.	(Montenegro) Herceg Novi	20	5	15	1530	1680	-150	25	
11.	(Serbia) Crvena zvezda	20	2	18	1165	1478	-313	22	
12.	(Bosnia and Herzegovina) Jablanica	0	0	0	0	0	0	0	excluded

== Final four ==
Final Four to be played 17 and 18 March 2007 in the Universiada Hall in Sofia, Bulgaria.

club 1	result	club 2
semifinals
(Croatia) Šibenik Jolly	92:61	(Bosnia and Herzegovina) Željezničar Sarajevo
(Bulgaria) CSKA Sofia	75:71	Gospić Croatia Osiguranje
for third place
Gospić Croatia Osiguranje	87:71	(Bosnia and Herzegovina) Željezničar Sarajevo
final
(Bulgaria) CSKA Sofia	73:67	(Croatia) Šibenik Jolly

2006–07 WABA NBL

CSKA Sofia
1st Title

== Awards ==
- Player of the Year: Latasha Byears (184-F-73) of CSKA Sofia (Bulgaria)
- Guard of the Year: Sandra Popović (177-G-77) of Šibenik Jolly (Croatia)
- Forward of the Year: Latasha Byears (184-F-73) of CSKA Sofia (Bulgaria)
- Center of the Year: Tihana Abrlić (194-C-76) of Šibenik Jolly (Croatia)
- Import Player of the Year: Latasha Byears (184-F-73) of CSKA Sofia (Bulgaria)
- European Player of the Year: Sandra Popović (177-G-77) of Šibenik Jolly (Croatia)
- Coach of the Year: Georgi Bojkov of CSKA Sofia (Bulgaria)

1st Team

- Latasha Byears (184-F-73) of CSKA Sofia (Bulgaria)
- Sandra Popović (177-G-77) of Šibenik Jolly (Croatia)
- Anđa Jelavić (174-G-80) of Šibenik Jolly (Croatia)
- Vita Kuktiene (187-F-80) of Gospić Croatia Osiguranje
- Dragana Zorić (178-F-78) of Željezničar Sarajevo (Bosnia and Herzegovina)

2nd Team

- Ana Dabović (183-G/F-89) of Herceg Novi (Montenegro)
- Tiffani Johnson (193-C-75) of CSKA Sofia (Bulgaria)
- Tihana Abrlić (194-C-76) of Šibenik Jolly (Croatia)
- Marina Ristić (168-G-87) of Željezničar Sarajevo (Bosnia and Herzegovina)
- Maja Erkič (182-G/F-85) of Merkur Celje (Slovenia)

Honorable Mention

- Luca Ivanković (200-C-87) of Šibenik Jolly (Croatia)
- Olga Masilionene (181-F-80) of Gospić Croatia Osiguranje
- Diana Naydenova (171-G-73) of Gospić Croatia Osiguranje
- Lucie Conkova (186-F-83) of Merkur Celje (Slovenia)
- Iva Perovanović (190-C/F-83) of Budućnost Podgorica (Montenegro)
- Jasmina Bigović (176-G-79) of Jedinstvo Bijelo Polje (Montenegro)
- Tina Periša (170-G-84) of Ragusa Dubrovnik (Croatia)
- Ivana Todorović (187-C-73) of Herceg Novi (Montenegro)
- Ivana Grubor (185-F/C-84) of Vojvodina NIS (Serbia)
- Jelena Velinović (193-C-81) of Crvena zvezda (Serbia)

All-Europeans Team

- Sandra Popović (177-G-77) of Šibenik Jolly (Croatia)
- Anđa Jelavić (174-G-80) of Šibenik Jolly (Croatia)
- Vita Kuktiene (187-F-80) of Gospić Croatia Osiguranje
- Tihana Abrlić (194-C-76) of Šibenik Jolly (Croatia)
- Dragana Zorić (178-F-78) of Željezničar Sarajevo (Bosnia and Herzegovina)
