= EuroBasket Women 2011 qualification =

This page describes the qualification procedure for EuroBasket Women 2011.

== Qualification format ==
The Qualifying Round was held from August 2 to August 29, 2010.

The top 2 teams in each group qualified to the EuroBasket Women 2011.

The best 6 of the remaining teams went to the Additional Qualifying Round, from which one additional team qualified to EuroBasket Women 2011.

The last 4 teams played in the Relegation Round, from which 2 teams were relegated to Division B in 2012–2013.

The Additional Qualifying Round and the Relegation Round were held from May 16 to June 11, 2011.

== Qualifying round ==
The draw for the Qualifying Round was held on January 16, 2010. The remaining 18 teams in Division A were divided into two groups of 5 teams and two groups of 4 teams.

Group A	Group B	Group C	Group D
Belgium; Lithuania; Croatia; Italy; Netherlands	Romania; Israel; Serbia; Latvia	Finland; Hungary; Bulgaria; Turkey; Montenegro	Great Britain; Ukraine; Germany; Slovakia

Qualified for EuroBasket Women 2011
Go to Additional Qualifying Round
Go to Relegation Round

=== Group A ===
Team	Pts	W	L	PF	PA	Diff
Lithuania	14	6	2	651	563	+88
Croatia	13	5	3	602	577	+25
Italy	13	5	3	580	557	+23
Belgium	10	2	6	593	619	−26
Netherlands	10	2	6	532	642	−110

Note: All times are local

2 August 2010
18:30

Report

Italy	69–76	Croatia
Scoring by quarter: 25–16, 18–25, 11–22, 15–13
Pts: Pastore 16; Rebs: Cinili 10; Asts: Gianolla 4		Pts: Lelas 17; Rebs: Lelas 8 Asts: Mandir, Ciglar 3

Pala Rockefeller, Cagliari
Attendance: 1,500
Referees: Keith Williams, David Musard, Toni Rodriguez

2 August 2010
19:00

Report

Lithuania	98–52	Netherlands
Scoring by quarter: 22–17, 22–13, 31–16, 23–6
Pts: Petronyte 18; Rebs: Paugaite 9 Asts: Staugaitiene, Linkeviciene 4		Pts: Klein 12; Rebs: Kooij 7 Asts: Beld 3

S. Dariaus and S. Gireno Sport Center, Kaunas
Attendance: 200
Referees: Aare Halliko, Daniel Berler, Simon Unsworth

5 August 2010
19:00

Report

Belgium	78–73	Italy
Scoring by quarter: 22–19, 16–23, 20–15, 20–16
Pts: Wauters 19; Rebs: Wauters 14; Asts: Wambe 9		Pts: Sottana 21; Rebs: Masciadri 7 Asts: four players 4

Sportcampus Lange Munte, Kortrijk
Referees: Miodrag Licina, Aleksander Gorshkov, Fernando Rocha

5 August 2010
20:00

Report

Croatia	72–80	Lithuania
Scoring by quarter: 21–22, 13–17, 24–30, 14–11
Pts: Mandir, Sliskovic 12; Rebs: Lelas 8 Asts: Jelavić 5		Pts: Stakneviciene 20; Rebs: Abromaite, Stakneviciene 7 Asts: Linkeviciene 7

Prolozac Sport, Donji Proložac
Referees: Zoran Zlatevski, Bojan Jovanic, Tamas Földhazi

8 August 2010
15:00

Report

Netherlands	78–72	Croatia
Scoring by quarter: 20–15, 20–18, 14–16, 24–23
Pts: Kooij 22; Rebs: Kooij 13; Asts: Bröring 4		Pts: Mandir 21; Rebs: Lelas 9 Asts: Jelavić, Lelas 3

Topsportcentrum Almere, Almere
Referees: Sigmundur Herbertsson, Stephen Ellis, Toni Rodriguez

8 August 2010
19:00

Report

Lithuania	95–78	Belgium
Scoring by quarter: 16–21, 17–22, 28–18, 34–17
Pts: Bimbaite 17; Rebs: Abromaite 9 Asts: Bimbaite 4		Pts: Leemans 16; Rebs: Van Malderen 12; Asts: Wambe 7

S. Dariaus and S. Gireno Sport Center, Kaunas
Referees: Petri Mäntylä, Peter Bodnar, Maxim Kolychev

11 August 2010
19:00

Report

Belgium	91–59	Netherlands
Scoring by quarter: 20–18, 18–11, 31–11, 22–19
Pts: Leemans 16; Rebs: Leemans 7 Asts: Wambe 4		Pts: Kooij 14; Rebs: Nieuwveen 9 Asts: Kooij, Nieuwveen 2

Sportcampus Lange Munte, Kortrijk
Attendance: 1,500
Referees: Anna Cardus, Asa Johansson, Carole Delauné

11 August 2010
20:30

Report

Italy	87–72	Lithuania
Scoring by quarter: 24–21, 19–17, 18–20, 26–14
Pts: Masciadri 19; Rebs: Ress, Alexander 6 Asts: Gianolla 3		Pts: Abromaite 21; Rebs: Abromaite 6 Asts: three players 3

Pala Rockefeller, Cagliari
Attendance: 1,800
Referees: Bernard Vassallo, Neil Wilkinson, Igor Poljansek

14 August 2010
19:30

Report

Netherlands	60–70	Italy
Scoring by quarter: 16–18, 17–15, 19–26, 8–11
Pts: Kooij 20; Rebs: Kooij 12; Asts: Beld 7		Pts: Nadalin 20; Rebs: Masciadri 8 Asts: Gianolla 6

Topsportcentrum Almere, Almere
Attendance: 1,000
Referees: Michel Glod, Joakim Forsberg, Haydn Jones

14 August 2010
20:00

Report

Croatia	85–70	Belgium
Scoring by quarter: 23–21, 17–11, 27–24, 18–14
Pts: Slišković 18; Rebs: Lelas 8 Asts: Lelas 5		Pts: Wauters 21; Rebs: Wauters 9 Asts: Wambe 5

Gradska Skolska Sportska Dvorana, Gospic
Attendance: 300
Referees: Shefqet Bekteshi, Caslav Cukalovic, Dragan Kralj

17 August 2010
17:30

Report

Netherlands	67–80	Lithuania
Scoring by quarter: 14–15, 23–23, 11–24, 19–18
Pts: Kooij 21; Rebs: Nieuwveen 8 Asts: Kooij 3		Pts: Bimbaite 18; Rebs: Linkeviciene 15; Asts: Abromaite 7

Topsportcentrum Almere, Almere
Attendance: 750
Referees: David Chambon, Bo Bundgaard, Torkild Rodsand

17 August 2010
20:00

Report

Croatia	74–63	Italy
Scoring by quarter: 15–14, 22–19, 16–13, 21–17
Pts: Slišković, Ivezić 18; Rebs: Ivezić 7 Asts: Ivezić 6		Pts: Ress 16; Rebs: Ress 8 Asts: Gianolla 4

Gradska Skolska Sportska Dvorana, Gospic
Attendance: 400
Referees: Tomasz Kudlicki, Igor Dragojevic, Pal Györffy

20 August 2010
19:00

Report

Lithuania	81–63	Croatia
Scoring by quarter: 21–21, 18–17, 16–7, 26–18
Pts: Petronyte 22; Rebs: Petronyte 11; Asts: Linkeviciene 7		Pts: Mandir 17; Rebs: Mandir, Jelavic 5 Asts: Mandir, Jelavic 2

S. Dariaus and S. Gireno Sport Center, Kaunas
Attendance: 500
Referees: Vladimir Okhrimenko, Aliaksandr Syrytsa, Mart Uuehendrik

20 August 2010
20:30

Report

Italy	67–57	Belgium
Scoring by quarter: 18–11, 9–17, 12–16, 28–13
Pts: Consolini 16; Rebs: Ress 9 Asts: Pastore, Ress 2		Pts: Wauters 17; Rebs: Wauters 8 Asts: Carpréaux, Wambe 2

Pala Rockefeller, Cagliari
Attendance: 1,200
Referees: Nikolaos Papadimitriou, Radomir Vojinovic, Fabiana Nitu

23 August 2010
19:00

Report

Belgium	61–64	Lithuania
Scoring by quarter: 7–18, 16–17, 21–16, 17–13
Pts: Wambe 23; Rebs: four players 6 Asts: five players 1		Pts: Linkeviciene 19; Rebs: Linkeviciene 12; Asts: Linkeviciene 3

Sportcampus Lange Munte, Kortrijk
Referees: Robert Hickman, Nuno Monteiro, Chris Dodds

23 August 2010
20:00

Report

Croatia	75–66	Netherlands
Scoring by quarter: 16–14, 24–18, 22–15, 13–19
Pts: Ivezić 23; Rebs: Jelavić 8 Asts: Jelavić, Mišura 4		Pts: Kooij 14; Rebs: Kraak, Nieuwveen 8 Asts: Bröring, Klein 3

Sports Hall Vijus, Slavonski Brod
Referees: Albi Greva, Zoran Zlatevski, Ognjen Jokic

26 August 2010
19:00

Report

Lithuania	81–83	Italy
Scoring by quarter: 22–17, 16–24, 27–15, 16–27
Pts: Linkeviciene 17; Rebs: Linkeviciene 8 Asts: Bimbaite 6		Pts: Alexander 21; Rebs: Masciadri, Ramon 5 Asts: Gianolla 4

S. Dariaus and S. Gireno Sport Center, Kaunas
Attendance: 500
Referees: Gennadi Ponomarev, Oskars Lucis, Serghei Tislenco

26 August 2010
19:30

Report

Netherlands	91–88	Belgium
Scoring by quarter: 29–19, 12–21, 27–19, 23–29
Pts: Kooij 39; Rebs: Kooij 10; Asts: Bröring 8		Pts: Wauters 23; Rebs: Wauters 14; Asts: Carpréaux 5

Topsportcentrum Almere, Almere
Referees: Eric Bertrand, Luis Lopes, Mart Uuehendrik

29 August 2010
15:00

Report

Belgium	70–85	Croatia
Scoring by quarter: 20–21, 20–21, 18–25, 12–18
Pts: Wauters 27; Rebs: Wauters 16; Asts: Carpréaux 5		Pts: Slišković, Ivezić 18; Rebs: Slišković 11; Asts: Jelavić 4

Sportcampus Lange Munte, Kortrijk
Referees: Florin Grigoras, Petra Kremer, David Musard

29 August 2010
20:30

Report

Italy	68–59	Netherlands
Scoring by quarter: 13–22, 16–20, 16–6, 23–11
Pts: Masciadri 16; Rebs: Nadalin 11; Asts: three players 2		Pts: La. Kooij 17; Rebs: Nieuwveen 11; Asts: Beld, Le. Kooij 4

Pala Rockefeller, Cagliari
Attendance: 1,500
Referees: Francis Santos, Janusz Calik, Vicente Bulto

=== Group B ===
Team	Pts	W	L	PF	PA	Diff
Israel	10	4	2	476	435	+41
Latvia	10	4	2	451	400	+51
Serbia	10	4	2	437	439	−2
Romania	6	0	6	403	493	−90

Note: All times are local

12 August 2010
17:45

Report

Israel	93–65	Serbia
Scoring by quarter: 26–13, 15–12, 25–20, 27–20
Pts: Cohen 26; Rebs: Selwyn 9 Asts: Cohen 7		Pts: Matić 17; Rebs: Matić 9 Asts: Milovanović 6

Zismann Sport Hall, Ramat Gan
Attendance: 700
Referees: Milan Brziak, Christos Christodoulou, Marius Ciulin

14 August 2010
17:00

Report

Romania	47–76	Latvia
Scoring by quarter: 17–13, 7–20, 9–20, 14–23
Pts: Pascalau 12; Rebs: Ciocan 6 Asts: Mandache, Ciocan 3		Pts: Basko 11; Rebs: Tamane 9 Asts: three players 2

Arena de Baschet, Bucharest
Attendance: 500
Referees: Maria Argirou, Gian Luigi Giancecchi, Sergiy Chebyshev

17 August 2010
20:30

Report

Serbia	87–52	Romania
Scoring by quarter: 23–16, 24–12, 21–5, 19–19
Pts: Maksimović 22; Rebs: Matić, Maksimović 9 Asts: Pešović, Milovanović 4		Pts: Pavel, Stoenescu 10; Rebs: three players 5 Asts: Ciocan 4

Sportski Centar Ruma, Ruma
Attendance: 2,500
Referees: Tonci Anzulovic, Ersan Kartal, Piotr Pastusiak

17 August 2010
20:30

Report

Latvia	66–71	Israel
Scoring by quarter: 14–18, 17–19, 16–19, 19–15
Pts: Basko 19; Rebs: Tamane 8 Asts: Basko 4		Pts: Doron 22; Rebs: Selwyn 6 Asts: Cohen 5

Arena Riga, Riga
Attendance: 2,500
Referees: Sergiy Zashchuk, Marc Hesters, Gintaras Vitkauskas

20 August 2010
17:30

Report

Romania	79–83	Israel
Scoring by quarter: 29–20, 18–16, 14–26, 18–21
Pts: Marginean 30; Rebs: Marginean 7 Asts: Ciocan 6		Pts: Doron 27; Rebs: Cohen 5 Asts: Cohen 8

Sala Sporturilor, Targoviste
Attendance: 500
Referees: Petros Christophides, Elena Chernova, Damir Javor

20 August 2010
20:30

Report

Serbia	75–63	Latvia
Scoring by quarter: 21–13, 17–14, 12–20, 25–16
Pts: Pešović, Dabović 18; Rebs: Matić, Maksimović 8 Asts: Matić 2		Pts: Basko 16; Rebs: Tamane, Basko 7 Asts: Karklina 4

Sportski Centar Ruma, Ruma
Attendance: 3,100
Referees: Robert Paulik, Miroslav Tomov, Ioannis Foufis

23 August 2010
20:30

Report

Latvia	83–70	Romania
Scoring by quarter: 25–21, 23–16, 13–15, 22–18
Pts: Tamane 15; Rebs: Tamane 14; Asts: Babkina 6		Pts: Pascalau 21; Rebs: Marginean 7 Asts: Marginean 3

Arena Riga, Riga
Attendance: 2,000
Referees: Rafael Ganiev, John Hammervoll, Csaba Cziffra

23 August 2010
20:30

Report

Serbia	70–68	Israel
Scoring by quarter: 17–17, 22–22, 12–14, 19–15
Pts: Pešović 16; Rebs: Maksimović 8 Asts: Dabović 4		Pts: Cohen 19; Rebs: three players 4 Asts: Cohe 4

Sportski Centar Ruma, Ruma
Attendance: 4,700
Referees: Maria Argirou, Vladimir Tsekov, Jelena Tomic

26 August 2010
17:30

Report

Israel	82–83 (OT)	Latvia
Scoring by quarter: 13–18, 17–15, 19–12, 10–14, Overtime: 8–8, 15–16
Pts: Cohen 24; Rebs: Fleischer 10; Asts: Cohen 13		Pts: Kublina 20; Rebs: Tamane 15; Asts: Karklina 5

Zismann Sport Hall, Ramat Gan
Attendance: 1,000
Referees: Marin Mehandjiev, Antonis Demetriou, Aytug Ekti

26 August 2010
18:00

Report

Romania	83–85	Serbia
Scoring by quarter: 13–26, 16–13, 28–22, 26–24
Pts: Marginean 25; Rebs: Bigica, Marginean 4 Asts: Diacona 6		Pts: Milovanović 25; Rebs: Matić 7 Asts: Dabović 3

Sala Sporturilor, Targoviste
Attendance: 300
Referees: Aristotelis Hadjisolomou, Ismail Özgün, Johann Jeanneau

29 August 2010
17:45

Report

Israel	79–72	Romania
Scoring by quarter: 27–20, 17–18, 16–17, 19–17
Pts: Cohen 27; Rebs: Levitsky 6 Asts: Selwyn 7		Pts: Marginean 16; Rebs: Pascalau 9 Asts: Mandache 5

Zismann Sport Hall, Ramat Gan
Attendance: 1,100
Referees: Nikolaos Papadimitriou, Dimitar Gologanov, Anton Makhlin

29 August 2010
20:30

Report

Latvia	80–55	Serbia
Scoring by quarter: 16–14, 11–12, 27–11, 26–18
Pts: Basko 22; Rebs: Basko 11; Asts: Babkina 7		Pts: Matić 13; Rebs: Matić 12; Asts: Dabović 4

Arena Riga, Riga
Attendance: 2,000
Referees: Karolina Andersson, Boris Gabara, Jurgis Laurinavicius

=== Group C ===
Team	Pts	W	L	PF	PA	Diff
Turkey	15	7	1	566	515	+51
Montenegro	14	6	2	594	533	+61
Bulgaria	13	5	3	599	534	+65
Hungary	10	2	6	528	548	−20
Finland	8	0	8	493	650	−157

Note: All times are local

2 August 2010
17:00

Report

Hungary	65–76	Montenegro
Scoring by quarter: 24–16, 15–14, 10–20, 16–26
Pts: Fegyverneky 21; Rebs: Horti 8 Asts: Fegyverneky 3		Pts: Perovanović 22; Rebs: Škerović, Perovanović 7 Asts: Škerović 5

Generali Arena, Miskolc
Referees: Dariusz Lenczowski, Tomislav Hordov, Petr Hrusa

2 August 2010
18:00

Report

Turkey	76–67	Bulgaria
Scoring by quarter: 24–10, 20–18, 14–15, 18–24
Pts: Tunçluer 18; Rebs: Bilge, Çağlar 6 Asts: Vardarlı 5		Pts: Zlatanova 19; Rebs: Georgieva 9 Asts: Hodges 6

Selcuklu Beledlyesi Spor Salonu, Konya
Referees: Seffi Shemmesh, Florin Grigoras, Maka Kupatadze

5 August 2010
17:00

Report

Finland	60–74	Turkey
Scoring by quarter: 19–21, 16–16, 18–22, 7–15
Pts: Tuukkanen 23; Rebs: Tuukkanen 1 Asts: Tuukkanen 5		Pts: Çağlar 17; Rebs: Çağlar 10; Asts: Vardarlı 3

Energia Areena, Vantaa
Attendance: 530
Referees: Apostolos Kalpakas, Vincent Delestrée, Evgeny Vetrov

5 August 2010
18:00

Report

Bulgaria	68–57	Hungary
Scoring by quarter: 16–17, 16–11, 12–15, 24–14
Pts: Hodges 27; Rebs: Zlatanova 5 Asts: Peteva 4		Pts: Fegyverneky 14; Rebs: Horti 10; Asts: Szlimák 4

Dunav Hall, Rousse
Attendance: 800
Referees: Georgios Tanatzis, Petar Denkovski, Gabriel Roceanu

8 August 2010
16:30

Report

Hungary	72–55	Finland
Scoring by quarter: 25–17, 20–14, 14–17, 13–7
Pts: Krivačević 18; Rebs: Horti 13; Asts: Fegyverneky 7		Pts: Pounds 14; Rebs: Tuukkanen 7 Asts: Kesänen 3

Tiszaligeti Sports Hall, Szolnok
Attendance: 1,200
Referees: Milija Vojinovic, Janusz Calik, Tomas Lukac

8 August 2010
20:00

Report

Montenegro	68–66	Bulgaria
Scoring by quarter: 19–20, 20–21, 13–17, 16–8
Pts: Dubljević 23; Rebs: Perovanović 12; Asts: Bjelica 6		Pts: Hodges 22; Rebs: Dimitrova, Slavova-Naneva 4 Asts: Hodges 4

SC Lovćen, Cetinje
Attendance: 500
Referees: Ademir Zurapovic, Gentian Cici, Erich Kratschmer

11 August 2010
17:00

Report

Finland	55–94	Montenegro
Scoring by quarter: 12–24, 9–18, 16–18, 18–34
Pts: Tuukkanen 14; Rebs: Tuukkanen 8 Asts: Kesänen 2		Pts: Dubljević 21; Rebs: Dubljević 11; Asts: Perovanović 6

Barona Areena, Espoo
Attendance: 580
Referees: Keith Williams, Aliaksandr Syrytsa, Daniel Berler

11 August 2010
17:30

Report

Turkey	62–54	Hungary
Scoring by quarter: 14–19, 16–11, 13–11, 19–13
Pts: Tunçluer 18; Rebs: Yılmaz 7 Asts: Vardarlı 5		Pts: Horti 20; Rebs: Horti 9 Asts: Fürész 3

Selcuklu Beledlyesi Spor Salonu, Konya
Attendance: 1,300
Referees: Anastasios Piloidis, Milan Adamovic, Serghei Tislenco

14 August 2010
18:00

Report

Bulgaria	88–65	Finland
Scoring by quarter: 26–20, 21–13, 22–19, 19–13
Pts: Hodges 20; Rebs: Miteva 9 Asts: Peteva 4		Pts: Tuukkanen 12; Rebs: Tuukkanen 8 Asts: Pounds 5

Dunav Hall, Rousse
Attendance: 500
Referees: Sinisa Herceg, Fabiana Nitu, Petr Hrusa

14 August 2010
20:00

Report

Montenegro	70–52	Turkey
Scoring by quarter: 17–16, 21–12, 12–12, 20–12
Pts: Perovanović 19; Rebs: Perovanović 7 Asts: Dubljević 6		Pts: Yılmaz 16; Rebs: Yılmaz 6 Asts: Yiğit 3

SC Lovćen, Cetinje
Attendance: 1,500
Referees: Jaroslav Janac, Andrej Lovsin, Jasmina Biscevic

17 August 2010
18:00

Report

Bulgaria	60–63	Turkey
Scoring by quarter: 23–11, 20–14, 2–14, 15–24
Pts: Zlatanova 18; Rebs: Zlatanova, Miteva 7 Asts: four players 2		Pts: Yılmaz 18; Rebs: Yılmaz 12; Asts: Yılmaz 4

Dunav Hall, Rousse
Attendance: 800
Referees: Chrisostomos Schinas, Roman Ponomarenko, Erez Gurion

17 August 2010
20:00

Report

Montenegro	75–73	Hungary
Scoring by quarter: 19–14, 19–29, 21–11, 16–19
Pts: Dubljević 21; Rebs: Perovanović 9 Asts: Škerović, Dubljević 5		Pts: Fegyverneky 32; Rebs: Horti, Vida 5 Asts: Fegyverneky 3

SC Lovćen, Cetinje
Attendance: 1,000
Referees: Dragan Kralj, Boris Gabara, Igor Poljansek

20 August 2010
16:30

Report

Hungary	71–78	Bulgaria
Scoring by quarter: 27–13, 10–14, 22–28, 12–23
Pts: Horti 20; Rebs: Horti 10; Asts: Szlimák 8		Pts: Hodges 24; Rebs: Miteva 8 Asts: Dimitrova 6

Tiszaligeti Sports Hall, Szolnok
Attendance: 800
Referees: Milan Mazic, Marek Maliszewski, Bojan Jovanic

20 August 2010
18:00

Report

Turkey	89–64	Finland
Scoring by quarter: 31–14, 18–11, 18–17, 22–22
Pts: Gezer 18; Rebs: Bilge 8 Asts: Saylar 7		Pts: Sten 12; Rebs: Tuukkanen 6 Asts: Tuukkanen 3

Ahmet Cömert Sport Hall, Istanbul
Referees: Stelian Banica, Zaza Machaladze, Damir Kunosic

23 August 2010
17:00

Report

Finland	56–61	Hungary
Scoring by quarter: 12–13, 14–15, 19–15, 11–18
Pts: Tuukkanen, Korpivaara 16; Rebs: Tuukkanen 9 Asts: Korpivaara 3		Pts: Krivačević 16; Rebs: Horti 8 Asts: Szlimák 3

Energia Areena, Vantaa
Attendance: 620
Referees: Juris Kokainis, Toni Rodriguez, Markos Michaelides

23 August 2010
18:00

Report

Bulgaria	89–57	Montenegro
Scoring by quarter: 28–17, 23–6, 20–11, 18–23
Pts: Hodges 20; Rebs: Zlatanova, Slavova-Naneva 4 Asts: Hodges, Stanoeva 3		Pts: Dubljević 17; Rebs: Baletić, Dubljević 6 Asts: Škerović 3

Dunav Hall, Rousse
Attendance: 700
Referees: Florin Grigoras, Maja Vukanovic, Nikolaos Somos

26 August 2010
17:00

Report

Hungary	75–78 (OT)	Turkey
Scoring by quarter: 27–17, 24–22, 18–15, 0–15, Overtime: 6–9
Pts: Horti 19; Rebs: Horti 11; Asts: Szlimák 5		Pts: Yılmaz 19; Rebs: Çağlar 7 Asts: Tunçluer 5

Generali Arena, Miskolc
Referees: Robert Vyklicky, Aleksandar Milojevik, Charalampos Santos

26 August 2010
20:00

Report

Montenegro	89–61	Finland
Scoring by quarter: 22–19, 23–15, 20–13, 24–14
Pts: Dubljević 22; Rebs: Perovanović 9 Asts: Škerović 9		Pts: Sten 15; Rebs: Tuukkanen 9 Asts: Kesänen 3

SC Lovćen, Cetinje
Attendance: 600
Referees: Zoran Zlatevski, Peter Zenis, Ervin Koci

29 August 2010
17:00

Report

Finland	77–83 (OT)	Bulgaria
Scoring by quarter: 19–20, 21–23, 19–9, 11–18, Overtime: 7–13
Pts: Sten 22; Rebs: Tuukkanen 13; Asts: Sten 3		Pts: Zlatanova 24; Rebs: Miteva 13; Asts: Hodges 3

Energia Areena, Vantaa
Attendance: 336
Referees: Piotr Ivashkov, Andres Tobi, Martins Briedis

29 August 2010
17:30

Report

Turkey	72–65	Montenegro
Scoring by quarter: 17–20, 18–10, 17–18, 20–17
Pts: Tunçluer 17; Rebs: Çağlar 7 Asts: Vardarlı 6		Pts: Perovanović 19; Rebs: Škerović 10; Asts: Škerović 8

Selcuklu Beledlyesi Spor Salonu, Konya
Attendance: 1,500
Referees: Tonci Anzulovic, Tomislav Kovacic, Alakbar Hasanov

=== Group D ===
Team	Pts	W	L	PF	PA	Diff
Great Britain	10	4	2	409	380	+29
Slovakia	9	3	3	412	382	+30
Ukraine	9	3	3	382	412	−30
Germany	8	2	4	381	410	−29

Note: All times are local

14 August 2010
16:00

Report

Great Britain	67–76	Slovakia
Scoring by quarter: 16–17, 20–17, 12–22, 19–20
Pts: Leedham 17; Rebs: Butler 7 Asts: Leedham 5		Pts: Michulková 19; Rebs: Podesvová, Lásková 7 Asts: Jalcová 5

NIA Birmingham, Birmingham
Attendance: 1,000
Referees: Eric Bertrand, Carlos Cortes, Bert Van Slooten

14 August 2010
17:00

Report

Ukraine	56–60	Germany
Scoring by quarter: 16–22, 15–9, 13–11, 12–18
Pts: Sazonenko 16; Rebs: Ogorodnikova 10; Asts: four players 2		Pts: Fröhlich 15; Rebs: Austmann, Fröhlich 6 Asts: Barnert, Bär 4

Meridian Sports Complex, Kyiv
Attendance: 700
Referees: Peter Bodnar, Elena Chernova, Antonis Demetriou

17 August 2010
19:00

Report

Germany	63–72	Great Britain
Scoring by quarter: 13–23, 18–15, 13–14, 19–20
Pts: Fröhlich 25; Rebs: Fröhlich 8 Asts: Richter 5		Pts: Page 20; Rebs: Stewart 7 Asts: Leedham 4

Lindenhalle, Wolfenbüttel
Attendance: 950
Referees: Oskars Lucis, Anton Makhlin, Markos Michaelides

17 August 2010
19:00

Report

Slovakia	82–53	Ukraine
Scoring by quarter: 20–14, 14–8, 23–8, 25–23
Pts: Kupcikova 16; Rebs: Kupcikova 10; Asts: Hrickova 6		Pts: Ogorodnikova 9 Rebs: Ogorodnikova 9 Asts: Markotenko, Isachenko 2

Infiniti Arena, Košice
Referees: Fabio Facchini, Roman Kolar, Haris Bijedic

20 August 2010
17:00

Report

Germany	63–58 (OT)	Slovakia
Scoring by quarter: 15–13, 16–15, 10–14, 13–12, Overtime: 9–4
Pts: Fröhlich 19; Rebs: Fröhlich 18; Asts: Breitreiner 3		Pts: Jalcová 13; Rebs: Lásková, Hrickova 7 Asts: Michulková 3

Gerry Weber Stadion, Halle
Attendance: 2,000
Referees: Olegs Latisevs, Daniel Berler, Nicolaas Zwiep

20 August 2010
19:00

Report

Great Britain	57–49	Ukraine
Scoring by quarter: 9–15, 12–10, 17–10, 19–14
Pts: Leedham 18; Rebs: Page, Butler 8 Asts: Collins 4		Pts: Kochubei 11; Rebs: Alyoshkina 9 Asts: five players 2

Surrey Sports Park, Guildford
Referees: Bernard Vassallo, Johannes Sarekoski, Johann Jeanneau

23 August 2010
19:00

Report

Slovakia	63–70	Great Britain
Scoring by quarter: 26–16, 12–21, 12–16, 13–17
Pts: Jalcová 15; Rebs: Hrickova 8 Asts: Carnoká 6		Pts: Leedham 26; Rebs: Page 7 Asts: Stafford 4

Infiniti Arena, Košice
Referees: Peter Bodnar, Aleksandar Glisic, Michel Glod

23 August 2010
20:00

Report

Germany	69–74	Ukraine
Scoring by quarter: 26–15, 16–21, 13–20, 14–18
Pts: Fröhlich 19; Rebs: Fröhlich 11; Asts: Fröhlich 4		Pts: Sazonenko 23; Rebs: Kochubei 7 Asts: Isachenko 5

Sporthalle Charlottenburg, Berlin
Attendance: 750
Referees: Tomas Jasevicius, Marc Hesters, Tanel Suslov

26 August 2010
16:30

Report

Great Britain	77–59	Germany
Scoring by quarter: 20–11, 27–13, 12–21, 18–14
Pts: Page 18; Rebs: Page 9 Asts: Stafford 4		Pts: Nikagbatse 14; Rebs: Fröhlich 8 Asts: Barnert, Fröhlich 3

Echo Arena, Liverpool
Attendance: 1,500
Referees: Oscar Perea, Carole Delauné, Rune Larsen

26 August 2010
18:00

Report

Ukraine	80–78	Slovakia
Scoring by quarter: 15–14, 23–20, 17–18, 25–26
Pts: Isachenko 19; Rebs: Prystupa 6 Asts: Sazonenko 5		Pts: Lawless 20; Rebs: Lawless 7 Asts: Jalcová 7

Meridian Sports Complex, Kyiv
Attendance: 700
Referees: Henrykh Bekish, Dariusz Szczerba, Maka Kupatadze

29 August 2010
14:00

Report

Ukraine	70–66	Great Britain
Scoring by quarter: 15–17, 23–24, 21–11, 11–14
Pts: Prystupa 17; Rebs: Zherzherunova 11; Asts: Zherzherunova 4		Pts: Leedham 19; Rebs: Page 9 Asts: Leedham 2

Sports Complex Meteor, Dnipropetrovsk
Attendance: 5,200
Referees: Marko Vuckovic, Iskren Manolov, Henri Hilke

29 August 2010
19:00

Report

Slovakia	73–67	Germany
Scoring by quarter: 23–21, 22–23, 23–12, 5–11
Pts: Kupcikova 17; Rebs: Vynuchalova 6 Asts: Hrickova 4		Pts: Fröhlich 27; Rebs: Fröhlich 8 Asts: Richter 5

Infiniti Arena, Košice
Referees: Petar Obradovic, Vincent Delestrée, Zdravko Rutesic

== Additional Qualifying Round ==
The winner of each group will advance to a playoff for one spot at the EuroBasket Women 2011.

Group A	Group B
Ukraine; Hungary; Finland; Bulgaria; Netherlands	Italy; Germany; Romania; Serbia; Belgium

=== Group A ===
Team	Pts	W	L	PF	PA	Diff
Hungary	8	4	0	272	203	+69
Bulgaria	6	2	2	254	262	−8
Netherlands	6	2	2	236	269	−33
Ukraine	5	1	3	257	266	−9
Finland	5	1	3	268	287	−19

3 June 2011
18:00

Report

Hungary	68–39	Netherlands
Scoring by quarter: 20–4, 21–13, 10–11, 17–11
Pts: Fegyverneki, Krivačević 13; Rebs: Horti, Szécsi 6 Asts: Fegyverneki, Szécsi 3		Pts: Halman 13; Rebs: Ligthart 7 Asts: Ligthart, de Kleijn 2

MKB Aréna Sopron, Sopron
Attendance: 2,000
Referees: Ivo Dolinek (CZE), Marcin Kowalski (POL), Jurgis Laurinavicius (LTU)

3 June 2011
20:15

Report

Bulgaria	57–61	Finland
Scoring by quarter: 19–16, 13–16, 12–16, 13–13
Pts: Stanoeva 14; Rebs: Georgieva, Hodges 5 Asts: Dimitrova 4		Pts: Tuukkanen, Pounds 14; Rebs: Tuukkanen 12; Asts: Korpivaara 3

MKB Aréna Sopron, Sopron
Attendance: 300
Referees: Aleksander Gorshkov (RUS), Petar Obradovic (BIH), Tomislav Vovk (CRO)

4 June 2011
18:00

Report

Finland	51–65	Hungary
Scoring by quarter: 15–18, 11–21, 10–9, 15–17
Pts: Korpivaara 13; Rebs: Pounds 6 Asts: three players 1		Pts: Horti 18; Rebs: Szécsi 8 Asts: Honti 8

MKB Aréna Sopron, Sopron
Attendance: 1,800

4 June 2011
20:15

Report

Ukraine	68–70	Bulgaria
Scoring by quarter: 15–19, 17–17, 21–14, 15–20
Pts: Sazonenko 11; Rebs: Zherzherunova 6 Asts: Kochubei 4		Pts: Hodges 27; Rebs: Zlatanova 7 Asts: Zlatanova 4

MKB Aréna Sopron, Sopron
Attendance: 350

5 June 2011
18:00

Report

Hungary	68–56	Ukraine
Scoring by quarter: 16–13, 19–16, 22–13, 11–14
Pts: Fegyverneki 19; Rebs: Szécsi 8 Asts: Fegyverneki 5		Pts: Zherzherunova 16; Rebs: Zherzherunova 9 Asts: five players 1

MKB Aréna Sopron, Sopron
Attendance: 2,100
Referees: Ivo Dolinek (CZE), Petar Obradovic (BIH), Milija Vojinovic (SRB)

5 June 2011
20:15

Report

Netherlands	83–80	Finland
Scoring by quarter: 22–28, 22–12, 29–20, 10–20
Pts: Beld 21; Rebs: van der Hoek 6 Asts: Halman 5		Pts: Tuukkanen 22; Rebs: Tuukkanen 7 Asts: four players 1

MKB Aréna Sopron, Sopron
Attendance: 200
Referees: Aleksander Gorshkov (RUS), Tomislav Vovk (CRO), Jurgis Laurinavicius (LTU)

7 June 2011
18:00

Report

Bulgaria	57–71	Hungary
Scoring by quarter: 20–25, 13–9, 18–23, 6–14
Pts: Hodges 23; Rebs: Zlatanova 6 Asts: Dimitrova 5		Pts: Fegyverneky 16; Rebs: Vajda, Horti 6 Asts: three players 3

MKB Aréna Sopron, Sopron
Attendance: 2,000
Referees: Ivo Dolinek (CZE), Petar Obradovic (BIH), Marcin Kowalski (POL)

7 June 2011
20:15

Report

Ukraine	51–52	Netherlands
Scoring by quarter: 17–14, 3–12, 22–12, 9–14
Pts: Zherzherunova 14; Rebs: Iagupova 8 Asts: Iagupova 2		Pts: Bröring, de Kleijn 10; Rebs: Ligthart 8 Asts: Bröring 2

MKB Aréna Sopron, Sopron
Attendance: 200
Referees: Aleksander Gorshkov (RUS), Jurgis Laurinavicius (LTU), Radomir Vojinovic (MNE)

8 June 2011
18:00

Report

Finland	76–82	Ukraine
Scoring by quarter: 18–20, 23–20, 12–18, 23–24
Pts: Tuukkanen 28; Rebs: Tuukkanen 11; Asts: Pounds 5		Pts: Zherzherunova 22; Rebs: Zherzherunova 11; Asts: Kochubei 4

MKB Aréna Sopron, Sopron
Referees: Ivo Dolinek (CZE), Marcin Kowalski (POL), Jurgis Laurinavicius (LTU)

8 June 2011
20:15

Report

Netherlands	62–70	Bulgaria
Scoring by quarter: 14–18, 10–21, 18–14, 20–17
Pts: Bröring 17; Rebs: Bröring 7 Asts: Beld, Ligthart 3		Pts: Hodges 19; Rebs: Zlatanova 11; Asts: Zlatanova 4

MKB Aréna Sopron, Sopron
Referees: Aleksander Gorshkov (RUS), Tomislav Vovk (CRO), Radomir Vojinovic (MNE)

=== Group B ===
Team	Pts	W	L	PF	PA	Diff
Germany	7	3	1	280	243	+37
Italy	7	3	1	277	239	+38
Serbia	6	2	2	278	284	−6
Belgium	5	1	3	243	282	−39
Romania	5	1	3	252	282	−30

3 June 2011
17:45

Report

Germany	69–57	Belgium
Scoring by quarter: 25–17, 13–12, 12–14, 19–14
Pts: Bär, Breitreiner 14; Rebs: Bär 13; Asts: Richter, Menz 4		Pts: Malfait, Mayombo 11; Rebs: Hendrickx 9 Asts: Ciappina 3

PalaMazzola, Taranto
Attendance: 200
Referees: Boris Gabara (SVK), Miguel Anguel Perez Niz (ESP), Panagiotis Anastopoulos (GRE)

3 June 2011
20:30

Report

Serbia	77–64	Romania
Scoring by quarter: 32–14, 21–17, 12–18, 12–15
Pts: Milovanović 18; Rebs: Milovanović 10; Asts: Gobeljić 4		Pts: Mărginean 12; Rebs: Pavel 5 Asts: three players 3

PalaMazzola, Taranto
Attendance: 200
Referees: Lahdo Sharro (SWE), Tomasz Trawicki (POL), Emin Mogulkoc (TUR)

4 June 2011
17:15

Report

Italy	76–55	Serbia
Scoring by quarter: 20–17, 20–14, 18–18, 18–6
Pts: Consolini 17; Rebs: Ress 9 Asts: Zara 5		Pts: Milovanović 12; Rebs: Knežević 5 Asts: Radočaj 3

PalaMazzola, Taranto
Attendance: 1,200
Referees: Panagiotis Anastopoulos (GRE), Lahdo Sharro (SWE), Gentian Cici (ALB)

4 June 2011
20:30

Report

Romania	65–59	Germany
Scoring by quarter: 22–14, 13–16, 17–15, 13–14
Pts: Mărginean 21; Rebs: Mărginean, Pop 6 Asts: Pop 5		Pts: Richter 18; Rebs: Bär 10; Asts: Bär 5

PalaMazzola, Taranto
Attendance: 200
Referees: Miguel Anguel Perez Niz (ESP), Tomasz Trawicki (POL), Boris Gabara (SVK)

5 June 2011
17:45

Report

Belgium	70–63	Romania
Scoring by quarter: 13–20, 18–12, 20–14, 19–17
Pts: Meesseman 20; Rebs: Meesseman 11; Asts: Dubuc 4		Pts: Pascalau, Mărginean 14; Rebs: Pop 7 Asts: three players 3

PalaMazzola, Taranto
Attendance: 200
Referees: Tomasz Trawicki (POL), Gentian Cici (ALB), Miguel Anguel Perez Niz (ESP)

5 June 2011
20:30

Report

Germany	78–57	Italy
Scoring by quarter: 22–21, 20–12, 16–10, 20–14
Pts: Breitreiner 31; Rebs: Bär 8 Asts: Richter, Mersch 3		Pts: Masciadri 12; Rebs: Masciadri, Ress 12; Asts: Ballardini 3

PalaMazzola, Taranto
Attendance: 1,500
Referees: Emin Mogulkoc (TUR), Panagiotis Anastopoulos (GRE), Lahdo Sharro (SWE)

7 June 2011
17:45

Report

Serbia	64–74	Germany
Scoring by quarter: 10–12, 23–22, 15–20, 16–20
Pts: Milovanović 14; Rebs: Matić 11; Asts: Milovanović 3		Pts: Greunke 16; Rebs: Bär 14; Asts: Kühn 4

PalaMazzola, Taranto
Referees: Panagiotis Anastopoulos (GRE), Miguel Anguel Perez Niz (ESP), Emin Mogulkoc (TUR)

7 June 2011
20:30

Report

Italy	68–46	Belgium
Scoring by quarter: 19–17, 13–9, 24–11, 12–9
Pts: Masciadri 19; Rebs: Ress 9 Asts: three players 3		Pts: Ciappina 14; Rebs: Meesseman 7 Asts: four players 2

PalaMazzola, Taranto
Referees: Gentian Cici (ALB), Boris Gabara (SVK), Lahdo Sharro (SWE)

8 June 2011
17:45

Report

Belgium	70–82	Serbia
Scoring by quarter: 25–23, 18–18, 12–21, 15–20
Pts: Meesseman 21; Rebs: Meesseman 10; Asts: three players 4		Pts: Matić 17; Rebs: Matić 8 Asts: Radočaj 6

PalaMazzola, Taranto
Referees: Boris Gabara (SVK), Emin Mogulkoc (TUR), Gentian Cici (ALB)

8 June 2011
20:30

Report

Romania	60–76	Italy
Scoring by quarter: 15–20, 21–14, 14–21, 10–21
Pts: Stoenescu 14; Rebs: Mărginean 9 Asts: Ciocan, Mărginean 3		Pts: Ballardini 18; Rebs: Masciadri 6 Asts: Gianolla 4

PalaMazzola, Taranto
Referees: Miguel Anguel Perez Niz (ESP), Tomasz Trawicki (POL), Panagiotis Anastopoulos (GRE)

=== Playoff ===
12 June 2011
18:30

Report

Germany	59–53	Hungary
Scoring by quarter: 15–16, 16–14, 14–14, 14–9
Pts: Austmann, Breitreiner 12; Rebs: Bär 7 Asts: Bär 2		Pts: Fegyverneky 16; Rebs: Fegyverneky 6 Asts: Fegyverneky 2

Willy-Jürissen-Halle, Oberhausen
Referees: Haydn Jones (WAL), Aare Halliko (EST), Haris Bijedic (BIH)

15 June 2011
20:30

Report

Hungary	56–67	Germany
Scoring by quarter: 17–13, 16–20, 7–16, 16–18
Pts: Fegyverneky 12; Rebs: Vajda 11; Asts: Fegyverneky 4		Pts: Greunke 14; Rebs: Richter, Bär 6 Asts: three players 4

Aréna Sopron, Sopron
Referees: Luis Lopes (POR), Alexandru Olaru (ROU), Tomislav Hordov (CRO)

Germany qualified for the Eurobasket Women 2011 after winning against Hungary 126–109 on aggregate.
