= 2005–06 EWWL Trocal league =

- League: EWWL Trocal league
- Sport: Basketball
- Number of games: 94
- Number of teams: 10

2005–06
- Season champions: (Croatia) Šibenik Jolly (2nd title)
- Season MVP: (Croatia) Sandra Popović
- Top scorer: (Serbia and Montenegro) Ana Dabović

WABA League seasons
- ← 2004–05 2006–07 →

EWWL Trocal League for season 2005–06 was the fifth season of WABA League. The study included ten teams from five countries, a champion for the second time in team history became Šibenik Jolly. In this season participating clubs from Serbia and Montenegro, Bosnia and Herzegovina, Croatia, Slovenia and Macedonia.

== Team information ==
Country	Teams	Team	City	Venue (Capacity)
Croatia	3			
Croatia	3	Gospić Croatia Osiguranje	Gospić	Gradska Školska Sportska Dvorana (2,000)
Croatia	3	Šibenik Jolly	Šibenik	Dvorana Baldekin (1,500)
Croatia	3	Croatia 2006	Zagreb	ŠD Peščenica (600)
Serbia and Montenegro	3			
Serbia and Montenegro	3	Budućnost	Podgorica	Morača Sports Center (4,570)
Serbia and Montenegro	3	Vojvodina NIS	Novi Sad	SPC Vojvodina (1,030)
Serbia and Montenegro	3	Herceg Novi	Herceg Novi	
Bosnia and Herzegovina	2			
Bosnia and Herzegovina	2	Željezničar Sarajevo	Sarajevo	Mala dvorana KSC Skenderija (800)
Bosnia and Herzegovina	2	Trocal Jedinstvo	Tuzla	SKPC Mejdan (5,000)
Slovenia	1			
Slovenia	1	Merkur Celje	Celje	Dvorana Gimnazije Celje - Center (1,500)
North Macedonia	1			
North Macedonia	1	Kimiko	Struga	

== Regular season ==
The League of the season was played with 10 teams and play a dual circuit system, each with each one game at home and away. The four best teams at the end of the regular season were placed in the Final Four.

Place	Team	Pld	W	L	PF	PA	Diff	Pts	
1.	Gospić Croatia Osiguranje	18	14	4	1484	1195	+289	32	Final Four
2.	(Slovenia) Merkur Celje	18	14	4	1416	1178	+238	32	Final Four
3.	(Croatia) Šibenik Jolly	18	14	4	1415	1132	+283	32	Final Four
4.	(Serbia and Montenegro) Vojvodina NIS	18	13	5	1390	1220	+170	31	Final Four
5.	(North Macedonia) Kimiko	18	12	6	1404	1219	+185	30	
6.	Croatia 2006	18	7	11	1311	1622	-311	25	
7.	(Bosnia and Herzegovina) Željezničar Sarajevo	18	5	13	1320	1416	-96	23	
8.	(Serbia and Montenegro) Budućnost	18	4	14	1309	1533	-224	22	
9.	(Serbia and Montenegro) Herceg Novi	18	4	14	1516	1807	-291	22	
10.	(Bosnia and Herzegovina) Jedinstvo	18	3	15	1157	1400	-243	21	

== Final four ==
Final Four to be played 24 and 25 February 2006 in the SPC Vojvodina in Novi Sad, Serbia and Montenegro.

club 1	result	club 2
semifinals
Gospić Croatia Osiguranje	64:70	(Serbia and Montenegro) Vojvodina NIS
(Croatia) Šibenik Jolly	82:73	(Slovenia) Merkur Celje
for third place
(Slovenia) Merkur Celje	76:59	Gospić Croatia Osiguranje
final
(Croatia) Šibenik Jolly	68:55	(Serbia and Montenegro) Vojvodina NIS

2005–06 EWWL Trocal League

Šibenik Jolly JBS
2nd Title

== Awards ==
- Player of the Year (MVP): Sandra Popović of Šibenik Jolly (Croatia)
- Top scorer: Ana Dabović of Herceg Novi (Serbia and Montenegro)

1st Team

- Sandra Popović (177-G-77) of Šibenik Jolly (Croatia)
- Katarina Maloča (190-F/C-75) of Gospić Croatia Osiguranje
- Ivana Dojčinović (189-F/C-81) of Vojvodina NIS (Serbia and Montenegro)
- Tihana Abrlić (194-C-76) of Šibenik Jolly (Croatia)
- Livia Libicova (193-C-77) of Merkur Celje (Slovenia)
