= First A Women's Basketball League of Montenegro =

Montenegrin women's basketball league

First А Women's Basketball League of Montenegro
- Current season, competition or edition: 2024–25 First A Women's Basketball League of Montenegro
- Sport: Basketball
- Founded: 2006
- First season: 2006-07
- No. of teams: 6
- Country: Montenegro
- Continent: FIBA Europe (Europe)
- Most recent champion: Budućnost
- Most titles: Budućnost (13 titles in independent Montenegro; 15 overall)
- Broadcaster: RTCG
- Level on pyramid: 1
- Domestic cup: Montenegrin Women's Basketball Cup
- Website: http://www.kscg.me

The First А Women's Basketball League of Montenegro is the highest women's professional club basketball competition in Montenegro. It was founded in 2006 after the dissolution of Serbia and Montenegro.

== History ==
=== Before independence ===
Before 2006, Montenegrin women's basketball clubs played in the league system of SFR Yugoslavia, FR Yugoslavia and Serbia and Montenegro.
While ŽKK Budućnost played in top flight during the SFR Yugoslavia era, Herceg Novi, Lovćen, Sutjeska ŽKK Roling and ŽKK Jedinstvo played in the First League of FR Yugoslavia/Serbia and Montenegro.
For the first time, Montenegrin side played in First Yugoslav League on season 1983-84. ŽKK Budućnost was the mist successful Montenegrin team in period until 2006, with two champion titles and 10 seasons spent in top-level.
From season 2004-05, ŽKK Budućnost left Serbia and Montnegro competitions and until independence played only in WABA League.
ŽKK Budućnost is the only Montenegrin side which ever played in Euroleague Women, on season 2002-03.
Below is the list of all-time participants of Montenegrin clubs in the First Yugoslav League.

| Club | 84 | 85 | 87 | 88 | 90 | 92 | 93 | 94 | 95 | 96 | 97 | 99 | 00 | 01 | 02 | 03 | 04 | 05 | 06 |
|---|---|---|---|---|---|---|---|---|---|---|---|---|---|---|---|---|---|---|---|
| Budućnost | 8 | 11 | 9 | 12 | 12 | - | - | - | - | - | - | - | 8 | 3 | 1 | 1 | 4 | - | - |
| Herceg Novi | - | - | - | - | - | 11 | 13 | - | - | - | - | - | 10 | 7 | 11 | - | - | - | - |
| Lovćen | - | - | - | - | - | - | 8 | 13 | 8 | 10 | - | - | - | - | - | - | - | - | - |
| Sutjeska | - | - | - | - | - | - | 12 | 14 | 15 | - | - | - | - | - | - | - | - | - | - |
| Roling | - | - | - | - | - | - | - | - | - | - | 14 | 8 | 9 | - | - | - | - | - | - |
| Jedinstvo | - | - | - | - | - | - | - | - | - | - | - | - | - | - | - | - | 10 | 4 | 4 |

First time, Budućnost won the championship on season 2001–02, after defeated ŽKK Hemofarm in playoff final series (3:2 - 91:92, 89:99, 80:77, 71:69, 85:78). Next year, Budućnost defended the trophy in final series against ŽKK Crvena zvezda (3:0 - 75:66, 20:0, 58:56).
Below is the list of Montenegrin clubs' champion titles in the First League of Yugoslavia.

| Club | Winners | Runners-up | Winning years |
|---|---|---|---|
| ŽKK Budućnost Podgorica | 2 | - | 2000-01, 2001-02 |

=== After independence ===
Soon after the Montenegrin independence referendum, Basketball Federation of Montenegro founded its own competitions, with the First A League as a top-tier women's league.
ŽKK Budućnost won first two seasons, but after that dominated ŽKK Jedinstvo with three consecutive trophies won. In period 2012-2023, all champion titles won ŽKK Budućnost.
Montenegrin clubs are playing in regional WABA league since its founding. Most successes had ŽKK Budućnost, who won the competition on seasons 2015-16, 2017-18 and 2019-20.

== Champions ==
From the inaugural season (2006/07), two clubs won the champion titles in Montenegrin Basketball League. ŽKK Budućnost had 10 titles, and ŽKK Jedinstvo three.

=== Titles by season ===
| Season | Winner | Result | Runner-up | Champion's Coach | Player of the season |
|---|---|---|---|---|---|
| 2006–07 | Budućnost | 3-1 | Jedinstvo | (Montenegro) Momir Milatović | (Montenegro) Snežana Aleksić (Budućnost) |
| 2007–08 | Budućnost | 3-1 | Jedinstvo | (Montenegro) Aleksandar Čurović | (Montenegro) Iva Perovanović (Budućnost) |
| 2008–09 | Jedinstvo | 3-0 | Budućnost | (Montenegro) Aleksandar Čurović | (Montenegro) Snežana Aleksić (Budućnost) |
| 2009–10 | Jedinstvo | 3-0 | Roling | (North Macedonia) Stojna Vangelovska | (Montenegro) Sanja Knežević (Jedinstvo) |
| 2010–11 | Jedinstvo | 3-0 | Budućnost | (Montenegro) Aleksandar Čurović | (Montenegro) Sanja Knežević (Jedinstvo) |
| 2011–12 | Budućnost | 2-0 | Roling | (Montenegro) Željko Vukićević | (Montenegro) Biljana Turčinović (Roling) |
| 2012–13 | Budućnost | 2-1 | Primorje | (Montenegro) Zdenko Grbavčević | (Montenegro) Ana Baletić (Budućnost) |
| 2013–14 | Budućnost | 2-0 | Primorje | (Montenegro) Miloš Kovač | (United States) Haleigh Lankster (Budućnost) |
| 2014–15 | Budućnost | 2-0 | Lovćen | (Montenegro) Goran Bošković | (Montenegro) Jovana Popović (Budućnost) |
| 2015–16 | Budućnost | 2-0 | Lovćen | (Montenegro) Goran Bošković | (Montenegro) Jovana Popović (Budućnost) |
| 2016–17 | Budućnost | 2-0 | Lovćen | (Montenegro) Goran Bošković | (Montenegro) Božica Mujović (Budućnost) |
| 2017–18 | Budućnost | 2-0 | Lovćen | (Montenegro) Goran Bošković | (Montenegro) Dragana Živković (Lovćen) |
| 2018–19 | Budućnost | 2-0 | Lovćen | (Montenegro) Goran Bošković | (Montenegro) Dragana Živković (Budućnost) |
| 2019–20 | Canceled due to the coronavirus pandemic | | | | |
| 2020–21 | Budućnost | 2-0 | Podgorica | (Montenegro) Vladan Radović | (Montenegro) Marija Leković (Budućnost) |
| 2021–22 | Budućnost | 2-0 | Podgorica | (Montenegro) Vladan Radović | (Montenegro) Maja Bigović (Budućnost) |
| 2022–23 | Budućnost | 2-0 | Podgorica | (Montenegro) Vladan Radović | (Montenegro) Marija Leković (Budućnost) |

=== Titles by Club ===
==== Montenegrin League ====
Below is a list of clubs with titles won in Montenegrin Basketball League.

| Club | Titles | Runners-up | Years won |
|---|---|---|---|
| Budućnost Podgorica | 13 | 2 | 2007, 2008, 2012, 2013, 2014, 2015, 2016, 2017, 2018, 2019, 2021, 2022, 2023 |
| Jedinstvo Bijelo Polje | 3 | 2 | 2009, 2010, 2011 |
| Roling Nikšić | - | 2 | |
| Primorje | - | 2 | |
| Lovćen Cetinje | - | 5 | |
| Podgorica | - | 3 | |

==== Overall ====
Below is an overall list, with titles won in both leagues - Montenegrin Basketball League and FR Yugoslavia / Serbia and Montenegro Championship.

| Club | Titles | Runners-up | Years won |
|---|---|---|---|
| Budućnost Podgorica | 15 | 2 | 2001, 2002, 2007, 2008, 2012, 2013, 2014, 2015, 2016, 2017, 2018, 2019, 2021, 2022, 2023 |
| Jedinstvo Bijelo Polje | 3 | 2 | 2009, 2010, 2011 |
| Roling Nikšić | - | 2 | |
| Primorje | - | 2 | |
| Lovćen Cetinje | - | 5 | |
| Podgorica | - | 3 | |

== Placements by season ==
Since establishing, in Montenegrin basketball league participated 13 different teams. Only ŽKK Budućnost played all the seasons in the highest tier competition.

| Club | 07 | 08 | 09 | 10 | 11 | 12 | 13 | 14 | 15 | 16 | 17 | 18 | 19 | 21 | 22 | 23 |
|---|---|---|---|---|---|---|---|---|---|---|---|---|---|---|---|---|
| Antivari | - | - | - | 4 | - | 5 | - | - | - | - | - | - | - | - | - | - |
| BKM | - | - | - | - | - | - | - | - | - | - | - | - | - | 4 | - | - |
| Budućnost | 1 | 1 | 2 | 3 | 2 | 1 | 1 | 1 | 1 | 1 | 1 | 1 | 1 | 1 | 1 | 1 |
| Castel Nuovo | 4 | 4 | 5 | - | - | - | - | - | - | - | - | - | - | - | - | - |
| Dećić | - | - | - | - | - | - | - | - | - | - | - | - | - | - | - | 4 |
| Herceg Novi | 3 | 6 | 3 | - | 4 | - | - | - | - | - | 6 | - | - | - | - | 3 |
| Jedinstvo | 2 | 2 | 1 | 1 | 1 | - | - | 4 | 5 | 5 | - | - | - | - | - | - |
| Kotor | - | 7 | - | - | - | - | - | - | - | - | - | - | - | - | - | - |
| Lovćen | - | - | - | - | - | 6 | 5 | 3 | 2 | 2 | 2 | 2 | 2 | - | - | - |
| Nikšić | - | - | - | - | - | - | - | - | 3 | 3 | 4 | 3 | 3 | 5 | 4 | 5 |
| Podgorica | - | - | - | - | - | - | - | - | - | - | - | - | - | 2 | 2 | 2 |
| Primorje | - | - | - | - | 6 | 3 | 2 | 2 | - | 4 | 3 | 4 | 4 | 3 | 3 | 6 |
| Roling | - | 3 | 4 | 2 | 5 | 2 | 3 | 5 | 6 | 6 | 5 | 5 | - | - | - | - |
| Rožaje | - | 5 | - | - | - | - | - | - | - | - | - | - | - | - | - | - |
| Rudar | - | 8 | 6 | 5 | 3 | 4 | 4 | 6 | 4 | - | - | - | - | - | - | - |
| Studentski Centar | 5 | - | - | - | - | - | - | - | - | - | - | - | - | - | - | - |

07 = season 2006/07

== Montenegrin women's basketball clubs in Regional League ==
=== WABA League ===
Women Adriatic Basketball League, or WABA League is founded at 2001, and Montenegrin clubs are part of it since 2004. Most successful Montenegrin representatives in WABA League were ŽKK Budućnost Podgorica and ŽKK Jedinstvo Bijelo Polje. While ŽKK Budućnost won three champion titles (2015–16, 2017–18, 2019–20), ŽKK Jedinstvo finished one season as a finalist in playoffs.
Below is list of participation of Montenegrin clubs by every season of WABA League.

| Club | 05 | 06 | 07 | 08 | 09 | 10 | 11 | 12 | 14 | 15 | 16 | 17 | 18 | 19 | 20 | 21 | 22 | 23 |
|---|---|---|---|---|---|---|---|---|---|---|---|---|---|---|---|---|---|---|
| Budućnost | 8 | 8 | 6 | 2 | 7 | - | - | 8 | 8 | 3 | 1 | 3 | 1 | 2 | 1 | 2 | 2 | 2 |
| Herceg Novi | - | 9 | 10 | - | - | - | - | - | - | - | - | - | - | - | - | - | - | - |
| Jedinstvo | - | - | 7 | 6 | 2 | 6 | 5 | - | - | - | - | - | - | - | - | - | - | - |
| Nikšić | - | - | - | - | - | - | - | - | - | - | - | - | - | - | - | - | - | 10 |

== Montenegrin women's basketball clubs in European competitions ==
Women's basketball clubs from Montenegro participated in FIBA competitions since the start of century. Clubs which played in European Cups until today are ŽKK Budućnost Podgorica and ŽKK Jedinstvo Bijelo Polje.
ŽKK Budućnost played in EuroLeague Women during the one season, but finished it after the group phase.

| Team | Seasons | G | W | L |
|---|---|---|---|---|
| ŽKK Budućnost Podgorica | 4 | 34 | 12 | 22 |
| ŽKK Jedinstvo Bijelo Polje | 1 | 6 | 0 | 6 |

As of the end of FIBA competitions 2015–16 season.

== See also ==
- Montenegrin Women's Basketball Cup
- Montenegrin Basketball League
