= Montenegrin women's basketball clubs in European competitions =

Women's basketball clubs from Montenegro participated in FIBA competitions since the start of the century. Clubs which played in European Cups until today are ŽKK Budućnost Podgorica and ŽKK Jedinstvo Bijelo Polje.

ŽKK Budućnost played in EuroLeague Women during the one season, but finished it after the group phase.

== Performances by season ==
Below is a list of games of all Montenegrin clubs in FIBA competitions.

| Season | Competition | Round | Team 1 | Team 2 | Game 1 | Game 2 |
|---|---|---|---|---|---|---|
| 2001-02 | FIBA Ronchetti Cup | Round 1 | ŽKK Budućnost Podgorica | Croatia Zagreb | 91-63 | 69-59 |
| 2001-02 | FIBA Ronchetti Cup | Group G | (Russia) Dynamo Moscow | ŽKK Budućnost Podgorica | 75-59 | 81-84 |
| 2001-02 | FIBA Ronchetti Cup | Group G | ŽKK Budućnost Podgorica | (Greece) Panathinaikos | 58-65 | 66-62 |
| 2001-02 | FIBA Ronchetti Cup | Group G | (Israel) Maccabi Ra'anana | ŽKK Budućnost Podgorica | 20-0 | 66-71 |
| 2002-03 | EuroLeague Women | Group A | (France) Tarbes | ŽKK Budućnost Podgorica | 74-65 | 70-71 |
| 2002-03 | EuroLeague Women | Group A | ŽKK Budućnost Podgorica | (Czech Republic) Brno | 72-77 | 75-113 |
| 2002-03 | EuroLeague Women | Group A | ŽKK Budućnost Podgorica | (Hungary) MiZo-Pécsi | 63-72 | 59-95 |
| 2002-03 | EuroLeague Women | Group A | ŽKK Budućnost Podgorica | (Poland) Polfa Pabianice | 70-66 | 69-74 |
| 2002-03 | EuroLeague Women | Group A | (Russia) UMMC Ekaterinburg | ŽKK Budućnost Podgorica | 76-55 | 67-54 |
| 2002-03 | EuroLeague Women | Group A | ŽKK Budućnost Podgorica | (Italy) Pool Comense | 78-73 | 71-94 |
| 2002-03 | EuroLeague Women | Group A | (France) Valenciennes Olympic | ŽKK Budućnost Podgorica | 96-57 | 100-63 |
| 2005-06 | EuroCup Women | Group G | ŽKK Jedinstvo Bijelo Polje | (Israel) Elektra Ramat Hasharon | 31-103 | 44-115 |
| 2005-06 | EuroCup Women | Group G | (Turkey) Mersin | ŽKK Jedinstvo Bijelo Polje | 134-54 | 69-47 |
| 2005-06 | EuroCup Women | Group G | (North Macedonia) Struga | ŽKK Jedinstvo Bijelo Polje | 82-56 | 108-67 |
| 2007-08 | EuroCup Women | Round 1 | (Albania) Flamurtari Vlore | ŽKK Budućnost Podgorica | 64-102 | 49-92 |
| 2007-08 | EuroCup Women | Group C | (Russia) Chevakata Vologda | ŽKK Budućnost Podgorica | 95-57 | 86-82 |
| 2007-08 | EuroCup Women | Group C | ŽKK Budućnost Podgorica | (Turkey) Botaş SK | 71-66 | 70-87 |
| 2007-08 | EuroCup Women | Group C | ŽKK Budućnost Podgorica | (Israel) Elektra Ramat Hasharon | 62-63 | 72-92 |
| 2008-09 | EuroCup Women | Group G | ŽKK Budućnost Podgorica | (Turkey) Galatasaray | 53-89 | 57-85 |
| 2008-09 | EuroCup Women | Group G | (Greece) Aris Holargou | ŽKK Budućnost Podgorica | 82-71 | 70-84 |
| 2008-09 | EuroCup Women | Group G | ŽKK Budućnost Podgorica | (France) USO Mondeville | 64-77 | 68-86 |

== Performances by clubs ==
During the overall history, two different Montenegrin clubs played in FIBA competitions. ŽKK Budućnost played in every competition (EuroLeague Women, EuroCup Women, Ronchetti Cup), while ŽKK Jedinstvo played one season in EuroCup.

| Team | Seasons | G | W | L |
|---|---|---|---|---|
| ŽKK Budućnost Podgorica | 4 | 34 | 12 | 22 |
| ŽKK Jedinstvo Bijelo Polje | 1 | 6 | 0 | 6 |

As of the end of FIBA competitions 2015–16 season.

== Scores by opponents' countries ==
Below is the list of performances of Montenegrin clubs against opponents in FIBA competitions by their countries (basketball federations).

| Opponents' country | G | W | L |
|---|---|---|---|
| Albania | 2 | 2 | 0 |
| Croatia | 2 | 2 | 0 |
| Czech Republic | 2 | 0 | 2 |
| France | 6 | 1 | 5 |
| Greece | 4 | 2 | 2 |
| Hungary | 2 | 0 | 2 |
| Israel | 6 | 1 | 5 |
| Italy | 2 | 1 | 1 |
| Macedonia | 2 | 0 | 2 |
| Poland | 2 | 1 | 1 |
| Russia | 6 | 1 | 5 |
| Turkey | 6 | 1 | 5 |

As of the end of FIBA competitions 2015–16 season.

== See also ==
- First А Women's Basketball League of Montenegro
- Montenegrin Women's Basketball Cup
