= Ana Baletić =

Montenegrin basketball player

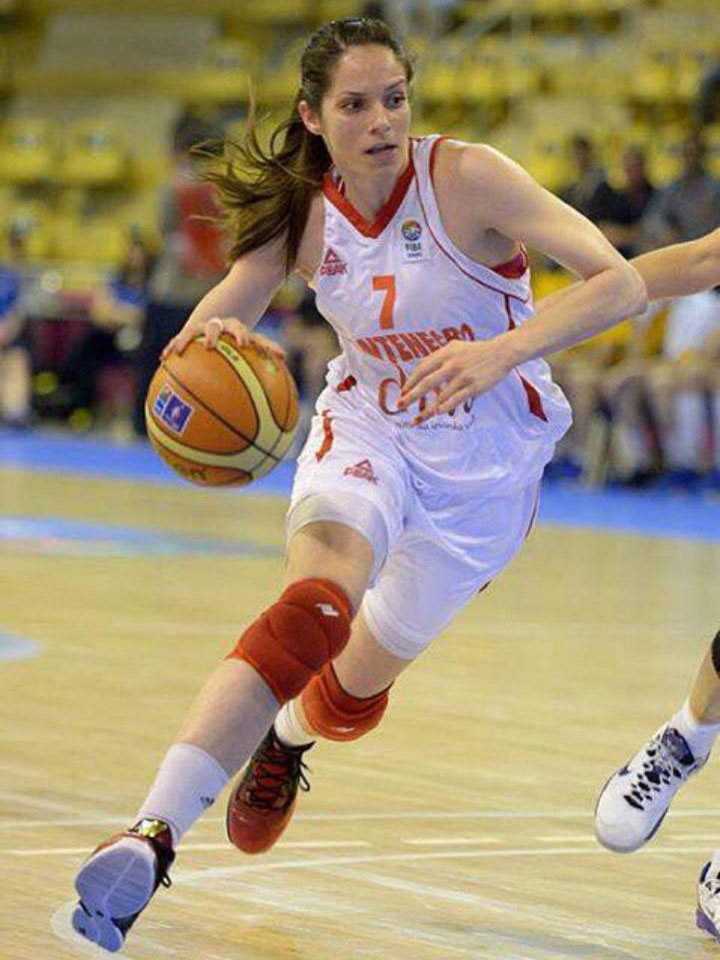
- Ana Baletić with Montenegro women's national team

Personal information
- Born: July 19, 1985 (age 41) Nikšić, SR Montenegro, SFR Yugoslavia
- Listed height: 6 ft 1 in (1.85 m)
- Listed weight: 170 lb (77 kg)

Career information
- Playing career: 2000–present
- Position: Small forward / power forward

Career history
- 2000-2002: Roling
- 2002-2003: Vojvodina
- 2003-2008: Buducnost
- 2008-2009: Mann Filter
- 2009-2010: Željezničar
- 2010-2011: Athinaikos
- 2012-2013: Buducnost Podgorica
- 2013-2014: Rucon
- 2014-2015: Kibirkštis-VIČI Vilnius
- 2015: Basket Konin
- 2015-2016: Udominate
- 2016-2017: Piestanke Cajky
- 2018-2019: AD Vagos
- 2019-2020: Heliopolis

Career highlights
- 5× First League of FR Yugoslavia / Serbia and Montenegro champion (2002–2006); 2× Serbia and Montenegro Cup winner (2002, 2003); 3× First A League of Montenegro champion (2007, 2008, 2013); 4× Montenegrin Basketball Cup winner (2006–2008, 2013); First A League of Montenegro top scorer (2008); League of Bosnia and Herzegovina champion (2010); Adriatic League champion (2013); First A League of Montenegro MVP (2013); Adriatic League top scorer (2013); Montenegrin Basketball Cup top scorer (2013)

Ana Baletić (Montenegrin Cyrillic: Ана Балетић) is a Montenegrin professional basketball player. She represented the Montenegrin national team. Standing at 1.85m (6 ft 1 in) she plays small forward, but she is capable of covering power forward as well.

== National team career ==
In 2001, 15 year old Baletić competed in the FIBA U16 European Championship for the Federal Republic of Yugoslavia national team (FR Yugoslavia). Over the next few years of FIBA Europe tournaments, Baletić did not make national U-17 nor national U-18 and U-19 teams.

EuroBasket Women 2011 qualification

After the 2006 Montenegrin independence referendum, Baletić was selected as a member of the Montenegro women's national basketball team. The new team started in the lower divisions of FIBA Europe competition, before a 12–0 record in Division B competition in 2008–09 promoted the team to the top-flight Division A of European Women's Basketball. In 2010, at the EuroBasket Women 2011 qualification tournament, Baletić and the Montenegro club qualified for the 2011 Eurobasket tournament. in group C, where she was top scorer for three points in the national team. Ana competed in the 2011 EuroBasket tournament with Montenegro national team, where they took 1st place in the group C and they finished on 6st place. Montenegro national team qualified from 1st place in group B in EuroBasket 2013 qualification. She competed in the EuroBasket 2013, where she played in starting five and team took 2nd place in group and finished on 10th place. They qualified for EuroBasket 2015 on EuroBasket 2015 qualification, where they took 1st place in group D.

== Career achievements and awards ==
Club

- 2001-2002 First League of FR Yugoslavia / Serbia and Montenegro champion, Serbia and Montenegro Cup winner (with Buducnost)
- 2002-2003 First League of FR Yugoslavia / Serbia and Montenegro champion, Serbia and Montenegro Cup winner (with Buducnost)
- 2003-2004 First League of FR Yugoslavia / Serbia and Montenegro champion (with Buducnost)
- 2004-2005 First League of FR Yugoslavia / Serbia and Montenegro champion (with Buducnost)
- 2005-2006 First A League of Montenegro champion, Montenegrin Basketball Cup winner, WABA NBL regional league 2nd scorer (with Buducnost)
- 2006-2007 First A League of Montenegro champion, Montenegrin Basketball Cup winner (with Buducnost)
- 2007-2008 First A League of Montenegro champion and 1st scorer, Montenegrin Basketball Cup winner, WABA NBL regional league 2nd place (with Buducnost)
- 2009-2010 League of Bosnia and Herzegovina champion, EuroCup 1st scorer of the team (with Željezničar)
- 2010-2011 EuroCup semifinal (with Athinaikos)
- 2012-2013 Adriatic League champion and 1st scorer, First A League of Montenegro champion and MVP, Montenegrin Basketball Cup winner and 1st scorer (with Buducnost)

National team

- 2000-2001 FIBA U16 European Championship 10th place (with Yugoslavia national team under-16)
- 2009-2010 EuroBasket 2011 qualification 2nd place of Qualification group C (with Montenegro national team)
- 2010-2011 Eurobasket 2011 6th place and 1st place in group (with Montenegro national team)
- 2012-2013 EuroBasket 2013 qualification Winner of Qualification Group B (with Montenegro national team)
- 2012-2013 EuroBasket 2013 10th place and 2nd place in group (with Montenegro national team)
- 2014-2015 EuroBasket 2015 qualification Winner of Qualification group D (with Montenegro national team)
