= 2024–25 First A Women's Basketball League of Montenegro =

Women's basketball league in Montenegro

First A Women's Basketball League of Montenegro
- Season: 2024–25
- Dates: Regular season: 19 October 2024 – 4 April 2025; Play Offs: 8–23 April 2025
- Teams: 6

Regular season
- Season MVP: (Montenegro) Nikolina Ilic

Finals
- Champions: Budućnost Bemax (15th title)
- Runners-up: Trebjesa
- Finals MVP: (Montenegro) Maja Bigovic

Statistical leaders
Points	(Montenegro) Nikolina Ilic	16.6
Rebounds	(Montenegro) Ljube Andric	9.5
Assists	(Montenegro) Janja Dragisic	5.8
Steals	(Montenegro) Andjela Rondovic	3.6
Blocks	(Montenegro) Maja Bigovic	1.6

The 2024–25 First A Women's Basketball League of Montenegro is the 19th season of the top division women's basketball league in Montenegro since its establishment in 2006. It starts in October 2024 with the first round of the regular season and ends in April 2025.

Budućnost Bemax are the defending champions.

Budućnost Bemax won their fifteen title after beating Trebjesa in the final.

== Format ==
Each team plays each other three times. The top four teams qualify for the play offs. The semifinals are held as a two legged aggregate tie while the final is played as a best of three series.

== Regular season ==
Pos	Team	Pld	W	L	PF	PA	PD	Pts	Qualification
1	Budućnost Bemax	15	15	0	1521	758	+763	30	Play Offs
2	Trebjesa	15	10	5	1244	770	+474	25 (Note: Trebjesa 2–1 Podgorica)	Play Offs
3	Podgorica	15	10	5	1038	833	+205	25	Play Offs
4	Primorje	15	6	9	1201	964	+237	21	Play Offs
5	Antivari	15	3	12	728	1259	−531	18	
6	Herceg Novi	15	0	15	614	1762	−1148	15	

Source: First A Women's Basketball League of Montenegro
Rules for classification: 1) Points; 2) Points difference; 3) Points scored.

== Play offs ==
Semifinals
1	Budućnost Bemax	104	116	220
4	Primorje	55	55	110
2	Trebjesa	49	75	124
3	Podgorica	43	47	90

Final
1	Budućnost Bemax	93	92	2
2	Trebjesa	63	64	0

Champions of Montenegro

Budućnost Bemax
Fifteen title
