= Goran Bošković (basketball) =

Montenegrin basketball player and coach

Personal information
- Born: 21 January 1972 (age 54) Titograd, SR Montenegro, Yugoslavia
- Listed height: 2.00 m (6 ft 7 in)

Career information
- NBA draft: 1994: undrafted
- Playing career: 1990–2007
- Position: Shooting guard / small forward
- Number: 4, 7, 10
- Coaching career: 2014–present

Career history

Playing
- 1990–1991: Podgorica
- 1991–1995: Radnički Beograd
- 1996–1998: FMP Železnik
- 1998–1999: Budućnost
- 1999–2000: Crvena zvezda
- 2000–2001: Maccabi Rishon
- 2001–2002: SLUC Nancy
- 2002–2003: Limoges CSP
- 2003: Hyères-Toulon
- 2003–2004: Atlas Belgrade
- 2005–2006: Keravnos Nicosia
- 2006–2007: Radnički Beograd

Coaching
- 2014–2019: ŽKK Budućnost Bemax
- 2019–2020: CSM Satu Mare
- 2020–2022: Crvena zvezda (assistant)
- 2022–2023: Panathinaikos (assistant)

Goran Bošković (born 21 January 1972) is a Montenegrin professional basketball coach and former player, who last served as an assistant coach for Panathinaikos of the Greek Basket League and the EuroLeague.

== Playing career ==
Bošković started his career in his hometown. He also played for Radnički Beograd, FMP Železnik, Crvena zvezda, and Budućnost. He won the YUBA League championship in 1999 with Budućnost. Bošković played for an Israeli team Maccabi Rishon LeZion during the 2000–01 season.

In the French Pro A, Bošković played for SLUC Nancy, Limoges CSP, and Hyères-Toulon between 2001 and 2003. He won the FIBA Korać Cup title in 2002 with Nancy. Bošković also played for Atlas Belgrade during the 2003–04 season.

== Coaching career ==
=== Women's basketball ===
Bošković was the head coach for Budućnost Bemax between 2014 and 2019, winning two WABA Leagues.

Bošković coached Romaninan team CSM Satu Mare for one season, 2019–20.

National teams

In 2017, Bošković was an assistant coach for the Montenegro national team under Roberto Íñiguez. Between October 2017 and 2019, he was head coach of the Ukraine national team.

=== Men's basketball ===
In December 2020, Bošković was named the first assistant coach for Crvena zvezda under Dejan Radonjić. He left the Zvezda after the Radonjić's departure in July 2022.

== Career achievements and awards ==
As player:

- FIBA Korać Cup winner: 1 (with SLUC Nancy: 2001–02)
- YUBA League champion: 1 (with Budućnost: 1998–99)
- Yugoslav Cup winner: 1 (with FMP Železnik: 1996–97)

As head coach:

- Montenegrin League champion: 5 (with Budućnost Bemax: 2014–15, 2015–16, 2016–17, 2017–18, 2018–19)
- WABA League champion: 2 (with Budućnost Bemax: 2015–16, 2017–18)
- Montenegrin Cup winner: 5 (with Budućnost Bemax: 2014–15, 2015–16, 2016–17, 2017–18, 2018–19)

As assistant coach:

- Adriatic League champion: 2 (with Crvena zvezda: 2020–21, 2021–22)
- Serbian League champion: 2 (with Crvena zvezda: 2020–21, 2021–22)
- Serbian Cup winner: 2 (with Crvena zvezda: 2020–21, 2021–22)

Individual

- Yugoslav Cup MVP – 1997
- 2× WABA League Coach of the Year – 2016, 2018
- No. 10 retired by FMP
