= Jelena Maksimović =

Serbian basketball player

No. 13 – Ceglédi EKK
- Position: Center
- League: First League of Hungary

Personal information
- Born: 20 April 1982 (age 44) Belgrade, SFR Yugoslavia
- Listed height: 1.92 m (6 ft 4 in)

Career information
- WNBA draft: 2004: undrafted
- Playing career: 2000–present

Career history
- 2000–2001: Crvena zvezda
- 2003–2004: Merkur Celje
- 2004–2005: Partizan
- 2005: Cote d'Opale Basket Calais
- 2006: Acis-Incosa Leon
- 2006: MBK Ružomberok
- 2007–2008: Jedinstvo Bijelo Polje
- 2008: Crvena zvezda
- 2009–2010: Željezničar Sarajevo
- 2010: Nitra
- 2010: Jedinstvo Tuzla
- 2010–2012: Energa Toruń
- 2012–2013: Antakya
- 2013–2014: Radivoj Korać
- 2014–2015: Danzio Timișoara
- 2015–2016: Ceglédi EKK
- 2018–2020: Radivoj Korać

Jelena Maksimović (Serbian Cyrillic: Јелена Максимовић; born 20 April 1982) is a Serbian professional basketball player, who plays as a center.

During her career, she played for several clubs in Serbia and abroad. She has also appeared for the Serbian national team.
