= Montenegrin Basketball Cup =

Annual basketball competition in Montenegro

Montenegrin Basketball Cup Crnogorski košarkaški kup
- Sport: Basketball
- Founded: 2006
- Country: Montenegro
- Continent: FIBA Europe (Europe)
- Most recent champion: Budućnost (16th title)
- Most titles: Budućnost (16 titles)
- Broadcaster: RTCG Adriatic Sport
- Website: kscg.me

The Montenegrin Basketball Cup is an annual cup competition for Montenegrin basketball teams held since 2007.

== History ==
=== Montenegrin clubs in Yugoslav Cup ===
Before the Montenegrin independence in 2006, clubs from Montenegro played in national Cup of Yugoslavia. Most successful was KK Budućnost with three trophies won.

First time, Budućnost won the trophy at final-four 1996 in Nikšić, defeating KK Partizan (126–115) in the final. Two years later, Budućnost won the final four, again in Nikšić (final match against KK Beobanka - 78:71). Last title of Yugoslav Cup winner, Budućnost gained in Vršac (2001) against KK Partizan (87–72).

Below is a list of Yugoslav Cup trophies won by Montenegrin clubs.

Club	Winners	Runners-up	Winning years
Budućnost Podgorica	3	1	1996, 1998, 2001

=== Montenegrin Cup (2006–present) ===
Except Montenegrin Basketball League as a top-tier league competition, after the independence, the Basketball Federation of Montenegro established Montenegrin Cup as a second elite national tournament. Inaugural season of Montenegrin Cup was 2006–07, and by now all the titles are won by Budućnost, except the season 2012–13, when KK Sutjeska surprisingly won the title in Montenegrin Derby.

== Winners and finals ==
=== Season by season ===
Below is a list of final matches of Montenegrin Cup since the 2006–07 season.

Year	Winner	Runner-up	Score
2006–07	Budućnost	Lovćen	87–62
2007–08	Budućnost	Danilovgrad	93–65
2008–09	Budućnost	Mogren	89–70
2009–10	Budućnost	Mornar	97–79
2010–11	Budućnost	Lovćen	68–43
2011–12	Budućnost	Sutjeska	71–64
2012–13	Sutjeska	Budućnost	64–55
2013–14	Budućnost	Sutjeska	83–57
2014–15	Budućnost	Zeta	98–61
2015–16	Budućnost	Mornar	90–80
2016–17	Budućnost	Mornar	72–68
2017–18	Budućnost	Mornar	87–83
2018–19	Budućnost	Sutjeska	85–71
2019–20	Budućnost	Mornar	92–83
2020–21	Budućnost	Mornar	102–93
2021–22	Budućnost	Mornar	89–77
2022–23	Budućnost	Podgorica	76–67
2023–24	KK Studentski centar	Budućnost	81–80
2024–25	Budućnost	KK Studentski centar	105–104
2025–26	Budućnost	KK Mornar	101–67

=== Trophies by team ===
==== Montenegrin Cup ====
Below is a list of clubs with trophies won in Montenegrin Cup (2006 onwards).

Team	Winners	Runners-up	Years won
Budućnost	18	2	2007, 2008, 2009, 2010, 2011, 2012, 2014, 2015, 2016, 2017, 2018, 2019, 2020, 2021, 2022, 2023, 2025, 2026
Sutjeska	1	3	2013
Studentski centar	1	1	2024
Mornar	–	8	–
Lovćen	–	2	–
Danilovgrad	–	1	–
Mogren	–	1	–
Zeta	–	1	–

==== Overall ====
Below is an overall list, including titles won in both national Cups - the Montenegrin Cup and the FR Yugoslavia / Serbia and Montenegro Cup.

Team	Winners	Runners-up	Years won
Budućnost	21	2	1996, 1998, 2001, 2007, 2008, 2009, 2010, 2011, 2012, 2014, 2015, 2016, 2017, 2018, 2019, 2020, 2021, 2022, 2023, 2025, 2026
Sutjeska	1	3	2013
KK Studentski centar	1	1	2024

== See also ==
- Montenegrin Basketball League
- Second Basketball League
- Montenegrin Women's Basketball Cup
