= Tiina Sten =

Finnish basketball player

Tiina Irene Sten (born in Turku, 18 June 1985) is a Finnish basketball player, currently playing for TSV 1880 Wasserburg in the German Bundesliga. She is a 1.89 m power forward.

She is a member of the Finnish national team.

== St. John's statistics ==
Ratios
| Year | Team | GP | FG% | 3P% | FT% | RBG | APG | BPG | SPG | PPG |
|---|---|---|---|---|---|---|---|---|---|---|
| 2004-05 | St. John's | 19 | 36.4% | 33.3% | 78.9% | 0.947 | 0.158 | 0.263 | 0.105 | 1.684 |
| 2005-06 | St. John's | 30 | 44.4% | 50.0% | 60.0% | 2.100 | 0.667 | 0.567 | 0.267 | 4.133 |
| 2006-07 | St. John's | 28 | 43.1% | 31.4% | 69.9% | 4.536 | 1.321 | 1.179 | 0.464 | 12.536 |
| 2007-08 | St. John's | 33 | 45.1% | 37.5% | 75.7% | 3.636 | 0.879 | 1.242 | 0.697 | 7.394 |
| Career | | 110 | 43.7% | 34.6% | 71.5% | 2.982 | 0.809 | 0.873 | 0.418 | 6.827 |

Totals
| Year | Team | GP | FG | FGA | 3P | 3PA | FT | FTA | REB | A | BK | ST | PTS |
|---|---|---|---|---|---|---|---|---|---|---|---|---|---|
| 2004-05 | St. John's | 19 | 8 | 22 | 1 | 3 | 15 | 19 | 18 | 3 | 5 | 2 | 32 |
| 2005-06 | St. John's | 30 | 52 | 117 | 5 | 10 | 15 | 25 | 63 | 20 | 17 | 8 | 124 |
| 2006-07 | St. John's | 28 | 132 | 306 | 22 | 70 | 65 | 93 | 127 | 37 | 33 | 13 | 351 |
| 2007-08 | St. John's | 33 | 91 | 202 | 9 | 24 | 53 | 70 | 120 | 29 | 41 | 23 | 244 |
| Career | | 110 | 283 | 647 | 37 | 107 | 148 | 207 | 328 | 89 | 96 | 46 | 751 |

== Career ==
- 2003-2004 (Finland) Turun Riento
- 2004-2008 (United States) St. John's Red Storm
- 2008-2009 (Spain) CB Islas Canarias
- 2009-2010 (Spain) CDB Zaragoza
- 2010-2011 (Greece) Panionios GSS
- 2011-2012 (Spain) Sedis Bàsquet
- 2012- (Germany) TSV 1880 Wasserburg
