= Lívia Libičová =

Slovak basketball player (born 1977)

Lívia Libičová (born 4 May 1977 in Zlaté Moravce) is a Slovak former basketball player who competed in the 2000 Summer Olympics.
