= Ekaterina Dimitrova =

Bulgaria basketball player

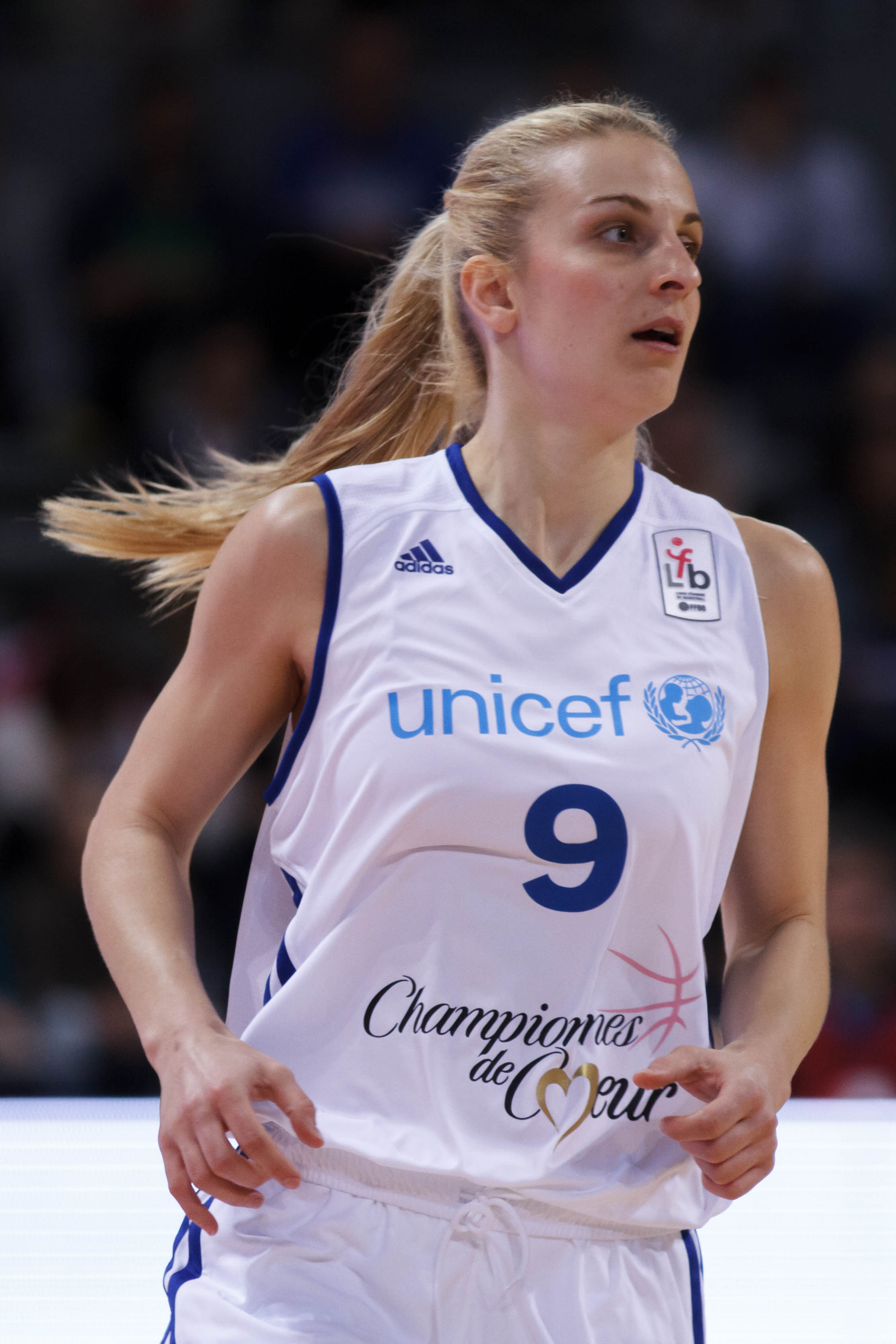

Personal information
- Born: November 23, 1987 (age 38) Plovdiv, Bulgaria
- Listed height: 1.82 m (5 ft 11 1/2 in)

Career information
- Playing career: 2004–present
- Position: Small forward

Career history
- 2004-2005: Levski Sofia
- 2005-2007: Alghero
- 2007-2008: Maccabi Ramat Hen
- 2008: Montigarda
- 2008-2010: Basket Landes
- 2010-present: Charleville

Ekaterina Dimitrova (Bulgarian Cyrillic: Екатерина Димитрова, born on 23 November 1987 in Plovdiv) is an international basketball player from Bulgaria, considered to be among the most talented female basketballers in the country. She has represented Bulgaria at all junior national levels and is also a member of the senior team.

Dimitrova married Batiste Kiurkulos in 2014. She has been active when it comes to charity causes.
