= Sanja Knežević =

Montenegrin basketball player

Personal information
- Born: 23 January 1984 (age 42) Bijelo Polje, SFR Yugoslavia
- Listed height: 1.88 m (6 ft 2 in)

Career information
- WNBA draft: 2006: undrafted
- Position: Power forward

Career history
- 2006–2011: Jedinstvo Bijelo Polje
- 2011–2012: Mladi Krajišnik
- 2012–2013: CSM Sportul
- 2013–2014: ZTE NKK
- 2014–2015: Jedinstvo Bijelo Polje

Sanja Knežević (Serbian: Сања Кнежевић; born 23 January 1984) is a Montenegrin basketball player. She plays at position Power forward.
