= Olga Masilionene =

Belarusian basketball player (born 1980)

Olga Masilionene (born 25 January 1980 in Minsk, Soviet Union) is a Belarusian basketball player who competed in the 2008 Summer Olympics.
