= Tanya Bröring =

Dutch basketball player

No. 6 – Loon Lions
- Position: Point guard
- League: Vrouwen Basketball League

Personal information
- Born: 25 December 1984 (age 41) Leiden, Netherlands

Career information
- Playing career: 2001–present

Career history
- 2001–2004: Grasshoppers
- 2004–2005: BV Lely
- 2005–2007: Landslake Lions
- 2007–2008: Universitario Ferrol
- 2008–2009: Heli Girls
- 2009–2010: Napoli San Dike
- 2010–2011: Limoges
- 2011: Lekdetec.nl Bemmel
- 2011–2012: Ciudad de Burgos
- 2012: Aros Léon
- 2012–2015: Toyota Recreativo Conquero
- 2015–present: Landslake Lions

Tanya Bröring (born 25 December 1984) is a Dutch basketball player, currently playing for Loon Lions of the Vrouwen Basketball League (VBL). She is a member of the Dutch national team.
