= Vita Kuktienė =

Lithuanian basketball player (born 1980)

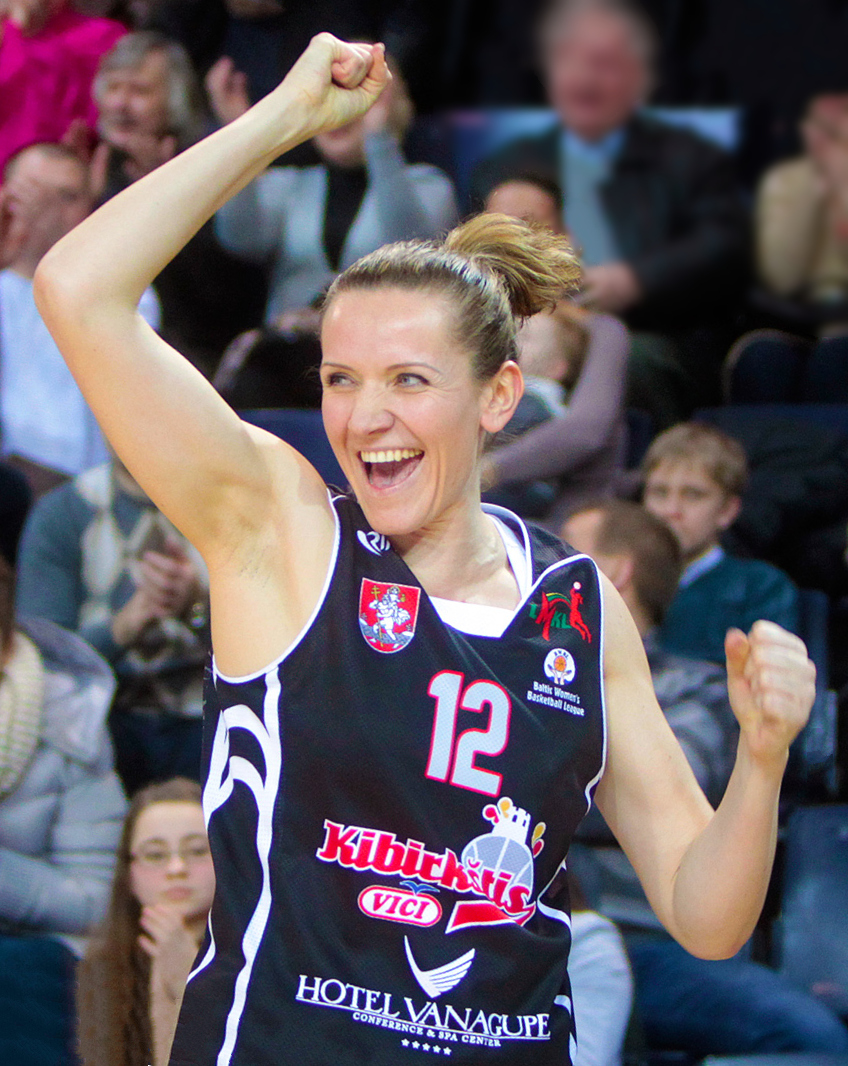
- Kuktienė in 2014

Personal information
- Born: 6 August 1980 (age 45) Ukmergė, Lithuanian SSR, Soviet Union
- Height: 187 cm (6 ft 2 in)

Sport
- Sport: Basketball
- Club: VIČI-Aistės Kaunas (2000–04); Arvi Marijampolė (2004–05); VIČI-Aistės Kaunas (2005–06); ŽKK Gospić (2006–2007); Stade clermontois Auvergne Basket 63 (2007–2008); VIČI-Aistės Kaunas (2009–14); Uni Girona (2014–)

Vita Kuktienė (born 6 August 1980) is a Lithuanian basketball small forward. She competed for Lithuania in all major European tournaments since 2001 and took part in the 2002 and 2006 world championships.
