= Montenegrin Women's Basketball Cup =

National women's basketball tournament of Montenegro

- Sport: Basketball
- Founded: 2006
- No. of teams: 8
- Country: Montenegro (2006–present)
- Continent: FIBA Europe (Europe)
- Most recent champions: Budućnost Podgorica (14th title)
- Most titles: Budućnost Podgorica (14 titles)
- Broadcaster: RTCG

The Montenegrin Women's Basketball Cup is the national women's basketball cup of Montenegro. It has been played for since 2006.

== History ==
=== Before independence ===
Before Montenegrin independence, clubs from that Republic played in national basketball Cup of Yugoslavia / Serbia and Montenegro. Most successful was ŽKK Budućnost with two finals (2001–02, 2002–03). In the finals 2002, ŽKK Budućnost lost against ŽKK Hemofarm (70:75), and year later against ŽKK Crvena zvezda (77:83).

=== After independence ===
Except Montenegrin Women's Basketball League as a top-tier league competition, after the independence, Basketball Federation of Montenegro established Montenegrin Cup as a second elite national tournament. The inaugural season of Montenegrin Cup was 2006-07, and since then all the titles have been won by ŽKK Budućnost and ŽKK Jedinstvo.

== Winners and finals ==
=== Season by season ===
Below is a list of winners and finalists of Montenegrin Cup since the season 2006-07.

Season	Winner	Runner-up	Result
2006–07	Budućnost Podgorica	Jedinstvo Bijelo Polje	
2007–08	Budućnost Podgorica	Jedinstvo Bijelo Polje	68:64
2008–09	Jedinstvo Bijelo Polje	Budućnost Podgorica	77:61
2009–10	Jedinstvo Bijelo Polje	Budućnost Podgorica	
2010–11	Jedinstvo Bijelo Polje	Budućnost Podgorica	75:50
2011–12	Budućnost Podgorica	Roling Nikšić	91:53
2012–13	Budućnost Podgorica	Primorje Herceg Novi	63:50
2013–14	Budućnost Volcano	Primorje Herceg Novi	71:42
2014–15	Budućnost Volcano	Lovćen Cetinje	83:67
2015–16	Budućnost Bemax	Lovćen Cetinje	81:68
2016–17	Budućnost Bemax	Lovćen Cetinje	78:36
2017–18	Budućnost Bemax	Lovćen Cetinje	95:57
2018–19	Budućnost Bemax	Lovćen Cetinje	74:51
2019–20	Budućnost Bemax	Lovćen Bemax	77:50
2020–21	Budućnost Bemax	Podgorica	73:59
2021–22	Budućnost Bemax	Podgorica	89:43
2022–23	Budućnost Bemax	Herceg Novi	122:54

=== Trophies by team ===
==== Montenegrin Cup ====
Below is a list of clubs with trophies won in Montenegrin Cup (2006-).

Team	Winners	Runners-up	Years won
Budućnost Podgorica	14	3	2007, 2008, 2012, 2013, 2014, 2015, 2016, 2017, 2018, 2019, 2020, 2021, 2022, 2023
Jedinstvo Bijelo Polje	3	2	2009, 2010, 2011
Lovćen Cetinje	0	6	
Primorje Herceg Novi	0	2	
Podgorica	0	2	
Roling Nikšić	0	1	
Herceg Novi	0	1	

==== Overall ====
Below is an overall list, including participation in the finals of both national Cups - Montenegrin Cup and FR Yugoslavia / Serbia and Montenegro Cup.

Team	Winners	Runners-up	Years won
Budućnost Podgorica	14	5	2007, 2008, 2012, 2013, 2014, 2015, 2016, 2017, 2018, 2019, 2020, 2021, 2022, 2023
Jedinstvo Bijelo Polje	3	2	2009, 2010, 2011
Lovćen Cetinje	0	6	
Primorje Herceg Novi	0	2	
Podgorica	0	2	
Roling Nikšić	0	1	
Herceg Novi	0	1	

== See also ==
- First A League of Montenegro
- Montenegrin Basketball Cup (men)
