= Tihana Abrlić =

Croatian basketball player

Tihana Abrlić Jurić
Personal information
- Born: 11 July 1976 (age 50) Zagreb, SFR Yugoslavia
- Listed height: 1.94 m (6 ft 4 in)

Career information
- WNBA draft: 1998: undrafted
- Playing career: –2009
- Position: Center

Career history
- Dubrava Zagreb
- Moscow
- 2008–2009: Jolly Šibenik
Medals
Women's basketball
Representing Croatia
Mediterranean Games
Gold medal – first place	1997 Bari	Team

Tihana Abrlić, married Jurić, (born 11 July 1976 in Zagreb, SFR Yugoslavia) is a Croatian female professional basketball player.

== Personal life ==
Tihana is a wife of Croatian basketball player Miro Jurić.
