= Anđa Jelavić =

Croatian basketball player

Andja Jelavić
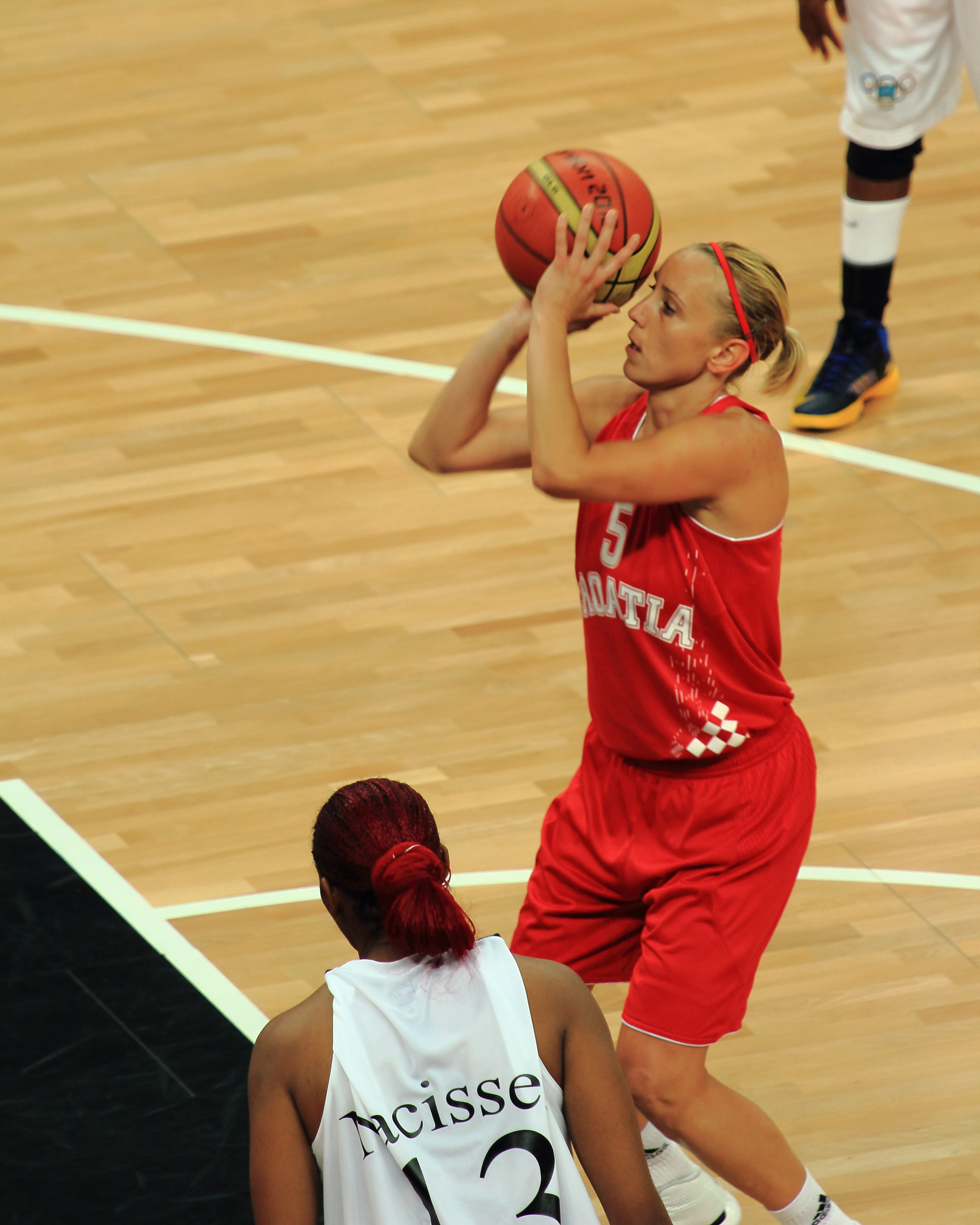
- Jelavić with Croatia during free throws at the 2012 Summer Olympics

Personal information
- Born: 21 September 1980 (age 46) Tomislavgrad, SR Bosnia and Herzegovina, SFR Yugoslavia
- Listed height: 1.72 m (5 ft 8 in)
- Listed weight: 59 kg (130 lb)

Career information
- WNBA draft: 2002: undrafted
- Playing career: 1998–2015
- Position: Shooting guard

Career history

Playing
- 1998–2002: Croatia Zagreb
- 2002–2008: Šibenik Jolly
- 2008–2009: Dynamo Moscow
- 2009–2010: Gospić
- 2010–2011: Wisla Krákow
- 2011: Novi Zagreb
- 2011–2012: Kayseri Kaski
- 2012: Ankara Kolejliler
- 2013–2014: Konak Belediye
- 2014–2015: İstanbul Üniversitesi

Coaching
- 2017–2019: Croatia
Medals
Women's basketball
Representing Croatia
Mediterranean Games
Bronze medal – third place	Pescara 2009	Team Event

Anđa Jelavić (born 21 September 1980) is a former Croatian female basketball player and current basketball coach. At the 2012 Summer Olympics, she competed for the Croatian national team in the women's event. She is 5 ft 8 inches (1 m 72 cm) tall.

== Career as coach ==
In April 2017, she was named the head coach of the Croatian women national team, instead of Braslav Turić, who was sacked. On 12 February 2019 she announced she is going to leave the Croatian national team because of family problems.
