= Sandra Mandir =

Croatian basketball player

Personal information
- Born: August 4, 1977 (age 49) Zagreb, SFR Yugoslavia
- Listed height: 1.77 m (5 ft 10 in)
- Listed weight: 61 kg (134 lb)

Career information
- WNBA draft: 1999: undrafted
- Playing career: 1995–2017
- Position: Guard

Career history
- 1995–2001: Medveščak
- 2001–2002: Galatasaray
- 2002–2003: Pécs
- 2003–2004: Medveščak
- 2004–2005: Novi Zagreb
- 2005–2007: Šibenik Jolly JBS
- 2007–2009: Gospić
- 2009–2010: Beşiktaş JK
- 2010–2011: Gospić
- 2011–2013: Novi Zagreb
- 2013: İstanbul Üniversitesi BGD
- 2014–2016: Wilki Morskie Szczecin
- 2016–2017: Plamen Požega
Medals
Women's basketball
Representing Croatia
Mediterranean Games
Silver medal – second place	2005 Almería	Team

Sandra Mandir, born Popović, (born 4 August 1977 in Zagreb, SFR Yugoslavia) is a former Croatian basketball player. At the 2012 Summer Olympics, she competed for the Croatia women's national basketball team in the women's event. She is 5 ft 10 inches tall.

== Career ==
- (Croatia) Medveščak (1997–01, 2003–04), Gospić (2007–09, 2010–11), Novi Zagreb (2004–05, 2011–2013), Šibenik (2005–07)
- (Turkey) Galatasaray (2001–02), Besiktas (2009–10), Istanbul Universitesi BGD (2013-)
- (Hungary) Pécs (2002–03)

== Awards ==
- in 2011, among 10 nominated candidates for the best European player, nominated by FIBA Europe
- 8th player of Europe in 2012 among 10 nominated candidates for the best European player, nominated by FIBA Europe
