= ŽKK Jedinstvo Bijelo Polje =

Montenegrin basketball club

- Arena: Nikoljac (capacity: 2,000)
- Location: Bijelo Polje, Montenegro
- Team colors: blue and White
- Championships: 3 National Leagues; 1 National Cup

Ženski košarkaški klub Jedinstvo Bijelo Polje (Serbian Cyrillic: Женски кошаркашки клуб Јединство Бијело Поље) is a Montenegrin women's basketball team from Bijelo Polje, Montenegro.

== Honours ==
National Championships – 3

- First А Women's Basketball League of Montenegro:
  - Winners (3) : 2009, 2010, 2011
  - Runners-up (2) : 2007, 2008

National Cups – 1

- Montenegrin Women's Basketball Cup:
  - Winners (1) : 2009
  - Runners-up (2) : 2007, 2008

== Notable former coaches ==
- Slađan Ivić
- Aleksandar Icić
- Nikola Milatović
- Aleksandar Čurović
- Goran Vojinović
- Stojna Vangelovska

== Notable former players ==
- Brankica Hadžović
- Stanecia Graham
- Jasmina Bigović
- Alesia Bialevich
- Sandra Joksimović
- Sanja Knežević
- Slavica Jeknić
- Melisa Burdžović
- Nataša Cvijović

== See also ==
- KK Jedinstvo Bijelo Polje
