= ŽKK Herceg Novi =

Montenegrin women's basketball team

- Founded: 1987
- Dissolved: 2009
- Location: Herceg Novi, Montenegro
- Team colors: blue and White

Ženski košarkaški klub Herceg Novi (Serbian Cyrillic: Женски кошаркашки клуб Херцег Нови) is a former Montenegrin women's basketball team from Herceg Novi, Montenegro.

== Notable former players ==
- Brankica Hadzović
- Jelica Dabović
- Milica Dabović
- Ana Dabović
- Jovana Pašić
- Jelena Vučetić

== Notable former coaches ==
- Milan Dabović
