= 2015–16 MŽRKL =

- League: Adriatic League
- Sport: Basketball
- Duration: 8 October 2015 – 13 March 2016
- Games: 76
- Teams: 11
- Total attendance: 14229
- TV partner: (Montenegro) RTCG

2015–16
- Season champions: (Montenegro) Budućnost Bemax (1st title)
- Season MVP: (Montenegro) Božica Mujović

MŽRKL seasons
- ← 2014–15 2016–17 →

MŽRKL League for the season 2015–16 was the fifteenth season of the Adriatic League. Competition included eleven teams from six countries. In this season participating clubs from Serbia, Montenegro, Bosnia and Herzegovina, Croatia, Slovenia and from Macedonia. MŽRKL League for the season 2015–16 has begun to play 8 October 2015. and ended on 10 February 2016, when he it was completed a League 6. Final Four to be played from 12 to 13 March 2016.

== Team information ==
Country	Teams	Team	City	Venue (Capacity)
Slovenia	3			
Slovenia	3	Athlete Celje	Celje	Dvorana Gimnazije Celje – Center (1.500)
Slovenia	3	Grosuplje	Grosuplje	ŠD Brinje (600)
Slovenia	3	Triglav Kranj	Kranj	Športna dvorana Planina (800)
Croatia	3			
Croatia	3	Kvarner	Rijeka	Športska dvorana Dinko Lukarić (1.100); Dvorana Mladosti (3.960)
Croatia	3	Medveščak	Zagreb	ŠD Peščenica (600)
Croatia	3	Trešnjevka 2009	Zagreb	Športska dvorana Trešnjevka (5,000); Dom Sportova (6.500); ŠD Peščenica (600)
Bosnia and Herzegovina	2			
Bosnia and Herzegovina	2	Čelik	Zenica	Arena Zenica (6.200)
Bosnia and Herzegovina	2	Play Off Happy	Sarajevo; Goražde	Sport Hall Sarajevo (800); Skenderija (5.616); Mirsad Hurić Hall (1.600)
Montenegro	1			
Montenegro	1	Budućnost Bemax	Podgorica	Morača Sports Center (4,570)
Serbia	1			
Serbia	1	Radivoj Korać	Belgrade	SC Šumice (2.000); Sport EKO Hall (1.000)
(North Macedonia) Macedonia	1			
(North Macedonia) Macedonia	1	Badel 1862	Skopje	SRC Kale (2.500)

== Regular season ==
In the Regular season was played with 11 teams divided into 2 groups of 5/6 teams and play a dual circuit system, each with one game each at home and away. The three best teams in each group at the end of the regular season were placed in the League 6. The regular season began on 7 October 2015. and it will end on 23 December 2015.

=== Group A ===
Place	Team	Pld	W	L	PF	PA	Diff	Pts	
1.	(Serbia) Radivoj Korać	10	10	0	778	568	+210	20	League 6
2.	(Croatia) Medveščak	10	7	3	693	641	+52	17	League 6
3.	(Slovenia) Triglav Kranj	10	6	4	679	677	+2	16	League 6
4.	(Slovenia) Grosuplje	10	4	6	639	612	+27	14	
5.	(Bosnia and Herzegovina) Play Off Happy	10	3	7	672	706	-34	13	
6.	(North Macedonia) Badel 1862	10	0	10	529	786	-257	10	

=== Group B ===
Place	Team	Pld	W	L	PF	PA	Diff	Pts	
1.	(Montenegro) Budućnost Bemax	8	8	0	598	506	+92	16	League 6
2.	(Croatia) Kvarner	8	6	2	562	488	+74	14	League 6
3.	(Bosnia and Herzegovina) Čelik Zenica	8	3	5	521	520	+1	11	League 6
4.	(Slovenia) Athlete Celje	8	3	5	599	582	+17	11	
5.	(Croatia) Trešnjevka 2009	8	0	8	443	627	-184	8	

== League 6 ==
In the League 6 was played with 6 teams and play a dual circuit system, each with one game each at home and away. The four best teams in League 6 at the end of the last round were placed on the Final Four. The regular season began on 28 December 2015. and it will end on 11 February 2016.

Place	Team	Pld	W	L	PF	PA	Diff	Pts	
1.	(Montenegro) Budućnost Bemax	10	9	1	665	600	+65	19	Final Four
2.	(Serbia) Radivoj Korać	10	6	4	701	655	+46	16	Final Four
3.	(Croatia) Medveščak (-1)	10	5	5	574	576	-2	14	Final Four
4.	(Croatia) Kvarner	10	4	6	600	623	-23	14	Final Four
5.	(Bosnia and Herzegovina) Čelik Zenica	10	4	6	599	602	-3	14	
6.	(Slovenia) Triglav Kranj	10	2	8	606	689	-83	12	

== Classification 7–12 ==
Classification 7–12 of the MŽRKL took place between 27 January 2016 and it will end on 10 February 2016.

=== Seventh place game ===
Team #1	Agg.	Team #2	1st leg	2nd leg
(Slovenia) Grosuplje	137:155	(Slovenia) Athlete Celje	73:72	64:83

=== Ninth place game ===
Team #1	Agg.	Team #2	1st leg	2nd leg
(Bosnia and Herzegovina) Play Off Happy	168:113	(Croatia) Trešnjevka 2009	81:63	87:50

- Partizan which was supposed to play in the MŽRKL in the group B withdrew from the competition and the last placed team in Group A will automatically take 11 place.

== Final four ==
Final Four to be played from 12 to 13 March 2016, in the Morača Sports Center in Podgorica, Montenegro.

club 1	result	club 2
semifinals
(Serbia) Radivoj Korać	61:63	(Croatia) Medveščak
(Montenegro) Budućnost Bemax	70:57	(Croatia) Kvarner
for third place
(Serbia) Radivoj Korać	63:41	(Croatia) Kvarner
final
(Croatia) Medveščak	58:74	(Montenegro) Budućnost Bemax

2015–16 MŽRKL

Budućnost Bemax
1st Title

== Awards ==
- Final Four MVP: Irena Matović (186-F-88) of (Montenegro) Budućnost Bemax
- Player of the Year: Nina Premasunac (186-F/C-92) of (Croatia) Medveščak
- Guard of the Year: Sanja Mandić (178-SG-95) of (Serbia) Radivoj Korać
- Forward of the Year: Irena Matović (186-F-88) of (Montenegro) Budućnost Bemax
- Center of the Year: Nina Premasunac (186-F/C-92) of (Croatia) Medveščak
- Defensive Player of the Year: Živa Zdolšek (178-F/G-89) of (Slovenia) Triglav Kranj
- Most Improved Player of the Year: Božica Mujović (178-G-96) of (Montenegro) Budućnost Bemax
- Newcomer of the Year: Patricija Bura (188-C-96) of (Croatia) Medveščak
- Coach of the Year: Goran Bošković of (Montenegro) Budućnost Bemax

1st Team

- PG: Sanja Mandić (178-SG-95) of (Serbia) Radivoj Korać
- SG: Jovana Popović (173-PG-90) of (Montenegro) Budućnost Bemax
- F: Irena Matović (186-F-88) of (Montenegro) Budućnost Bemax
- PF/C: Nina Premasunac (186-F/C-92) of (Croatia) Medveščak
- C: Nataša Popović (192-C-82) of (Bosnia and Herzegovina) Čelik Zenica

2nd Team

- PG: Božica Mujović (178-G-96) of (Montenegro) Budućnost Bemax
- SG: Iva Borović (170-G-88) of (Croatia) Medveščak
- G/F: Živa Zdolšek (178-F/G-89) of (Slovenia) Triglav Kranj
- F/PF: Tamara Kapor (184-G-91) of (Montenegro) Budućnost Bemax
- C: Vladinka Erak (192-C-84) of (Serbia) Radivoj Korać

All-Defensive Team

- G: Ebone Henry (178-G/F-91) of (Montenegro) Budućnost Bemax
- G/F: Živa Zdolšek (178-F/G-89) of (Slovenia) Triglav Kranj
- F: Tamara Kapor (184-G-91) of (Montenegro) Budućnost Bemax
- PF: Nina Premasunac (186-F/C-92) of (Croatia) Medveščak
- C: Nataša Popović (192-C-82) of (Bosnia and Herzegovina) Čelik Zenica

Honorable Mention

- Nataša Bučevac (179-F-85) of (Serbia) Radivoj Korać
- Lea Miletić (183-F-95) of (Croatia) Kvarner
- Monika Tomljenović (180-G-85) of (Croatia) Kvarner
- Ivana Dojkić (180-SG-97) of (Slovenia) Athlete Celje
- Nikolina Babić (177-G-95) of (Bosnia and Herzegovina) Play Off Happy
- Nikolina Džebo (186-C-95) of (Bosnia and Herzegovina) Play Off Happy
- Branka Luković (190-PF-95) of (Spain) UCAM Jairis
