= 2015–16 MŽRKL League 6 =

League 6 of the MŽRKL, or Superleague, took place between 28 December 2015 and it will end on 11 February 2016.

The four best ranked teams advanced to the Final Four. The points against teams from the same preliminary round were taken over.

== Standings ==
Place	Team	Pld	W	L	PF	PA	Diff	Pts	
1.	(Montenegro) Budućnost Bemax	10	9	1	665	600	+65	19	Final Four
2.	(Serbia) Radivoj Korać	10	6	4	701	655	+46	16	Final Four
3.	(Croatia) Medveščak (-1)	10	5	5	574	576	-2	14	Final Four
4.	(Croatia) Kvarner	10	4	6	600	623	-23	14	Final Four
5.	(Bosnia and Herzegovina) Čelik Zenica	10	4	6	599	602	-3	14	
6.	(Slovenia) Triglav Kranj	10	2	8	606	689	-83	12	

== Fixtures and results ==
All times given below are in Central European Time.

=== Game 1 ===
29 December 2015
18:00

Report

Radivoj Korać	79–74	Čelik Zenica
Scoring by quarter: 19:17, 26:17, 11:18, 23:22
Pts: Mandić, Erak 19; Rebs: Erak 17; Asts: Mandić 6		Pts: Iriškić, Kapor 19; Rebs: Popović 9 Asts: Mitrašinović 4

Sport EKO Hall, Belgrade
Attendance: 100
Referees: Tresoglavić, Lesko, Mikulić

28 December 2015
19:30

Report

Medveščak	68–49	Kvarner
Scoring by quarter: 16:18, 13:7, 19:12, 20:12
Pts: Borović 24; Rebs: Premasunac 13; Asts: Čačić 3		Pts: Tomljenović 18; Rebs: Miletić 16; Asts: Blažević 3

ŠD Peščenica, Zagreb
Attendance: 50
Referees: Prpić, Marunica, Reić

29 December 2015
18:30

Report

Triglav Kranj	61–69	Budućnost Bemax
Scoring by quarter: 15:18, 16:21, 17:19, 13:11
Pts: Meden 19; Rebs: Zdolšek 8 Asts: Seničar 4		Pts: Matović 16; Rebs: Matović 8 Asts: Matović 5

Športna dvorana Planina, Kranj
Attendance: 100
Referees: Čavara, Karović, Luković

=== Game 2 ===
13 January 2016
18:00

Report

Kvarner	56–45	Triglav Kranj
Scoring by quarter: 16:6, 12:14, 15:13, 13:12
Pts: Marjanović 14; Rebs: Tomljenović 11; Asts: Miletić, Blažević 3		Pts: Žibert 11; Rebs: Zdolšek 9 Asts: Zdolšek, Meden 2

Dvorana Mladosti, Rijeka
Attendance: 100
Referees: Babić, Šobot, Skenderija

13 January 2016
18:00

Report

Čelik Zenica	66–72	Medveščak
Scoring by quarter: 11:16, 26:22, 16:20, 13:14
Pts: Kapor 24; Rebs: Popović 13; Asts: four players 1		Pts: Premasunac 27; Rebs: Premasunac 12; Asts: Tadić 5

Arena Zenica, Zenica
Attendance: 200
Referees: Jevtović, Milovanović, Prpa

14 January 2016
20:15

Report

Budućnost Bemax	74–54	Radivoj Korać
Scoring by quarter: 21:15, 20:16, 21:10, 12:13
Pts: Matović 27; Rebs: Matović, Roglić 6 Asts: Mujović 7		Pts: Mandić, Erak 15; Rebs: Erak 11; Asts: Mandić 5

Morača Sports Center, Podgorica
Attendance: 249
Referees: Kralj, Porobić, Marić

=== Game 3 ===
20 January 2016
18:30

Report

Medveščak	73–56	Budućnost Bemax
Scoring by quarter: 20:15, 20:8, 17:22, 16:11
Pts: Premasunac 19; Rebs: Premasunac 19; Asts: Čačić 6		Pts: Matović 19; Rebs: Matović 9 Asts: Popović 6

ŠD Peščenica, Zagreb
Attendance: 100
Referees: Čavara, Karović, Luković

21 January 2016
17:30

Report

Radivoj Korać	73–64	Kvarner
Scoring by quarter: 21:14, 19:12, 15:18, 18:20
Pts: Vasović, Bučevac 18; Rebs: Erak 15; Asts: three players 4		Pts: Miletić 20; Rebs: Perić 8 Asts: Šerić 4

Sport EKO Hall, Belgrade
Attendance: 100
Referees: Čavara, Karović, Luković

21 January 2016
19:00

Report

Triglav Kranj	60–63	Čelik Zenica
Scoring by quarter: 18:11, 10:13, 15:21, 17:18
Pts: Jevtović 22; Rebs: Seničar 10; Asts: Zdolšek 5		Pts: Iriškić 17; Rebs: Popović 11; Asts: Kalušić 4

Športna dvorana Planina, Kranj
Attendance: 100
Referees: Terlović, Stanković, Milin

=== Game 4 ===
27 January 2016
18:00

Report

Čelik Zenica	78–74	Radivoj Korać
Scoring by quarter: 16:14, 19:23, 15:15, 28:22
Pts: Kapor 21; Rebs: Kalušić 4 Asts: Iriškić 3		Pts: Vučković 16; Rebs: Erak 12; Asts: Mandić 5

Arena Zenica, Zenica
Attendance: 300
Referees: Holjevac, Katić, Pencinger

27 January 2016
18:00

Report

Kvarner	55–66	Medveščak
Scoring by quarter: 14:4, 9:17, 12:23, 20:22
Pts: Miletić, Šerić 13; Rebs: Blažević 6 Asts: Blažević 3		Pts: Džankić, Borović 16; Rebs: Premasunac 11; Asts: four players 2

Dinko Lukarič Hall, Rijeka
Attendance: 100
Referees: Lovšin, Kolar, Gajšek

28 January 2016
19:00

Report

Budućnost Bemax	63–55	Triglav Kranj
Scoring by quarter: 20:21, 14:14, 15:4, 14:16
Pts: Mujović 19; Rebs: Matović 13; Asts: Popović 7		Pts: Zdolšek 12; Rebs: Zdolšek 16; Asts: Meden 7

Morača Sports Center, Podgorica
Attendance: 550
Referees: Čavara, Avdić, Marić

=== Game 5 ===
4 February 2016
19:00

Report

Triglav Kranj	69–66	Kvarner
Scoring by quarter: 17:20, 24:14, 17:17, 11:15
Pts: Jesenšek 12; Rebs: Zdolšek 17; Asts: Zdolšek 7		Pts: Miletić 14; Rebs: Šesnić 5 Asts: Šerić 2

Športna dvorana Planina, Kranj
Attendance: 100
Referees: Adamović, Babić, Šabot

3 February 2016
18:30

Report

Medveščak	0–20	Čelik Zenica

ŠD Peščenica, Zagreb
Attendance: 0
Referees: /

4 February 2016
17:30

Report

Radivoj Korać	57–64	Budućnost Bemax
Scoring by quarter: 18:13, 18:13, 16:22, 5:16
Pts: Mandić 15; Rebs: Erak 6 Asts: Mandić 4		Pts: Matović 22; Rebs: Matović, Raković 10; Asts: Mujović 8

Sport EKO Hall, Belgrade
Attendance: 100
Referees: Čavara, Avdić, Palo

=== Game 6 ===
11 February 2016
19:00

Report

Budućnost Bemax	60–57	Medveščak
Scoring by quarter: 14:10, 14:19, 19:8, 13:20
Pts: Matović 18; Rebs: Madu 18; Asts: Matović, Mujović 5		Pts: Borović 22; Rebs: Todorić 9 Asts: Džankić, Majstorović 4

Morača Sports Center, Podgorica
Attendance: 150
Referees: Porobić, Marić, Ćavar

10 February 2016
18:00

Report

Kvarner	71–50	Radivoj Korać
Scoring by quarter: 20:8, 19:14, 15:11, 17:17
Pts: Blažević 16; Rebs: Miletić, Blažević 8 Asts: Šerić 7		Pts: Erak 21; Rebs: Erak 12; Asts: Bučevac, Stojiljković 3

ŠD Dinko Lukarić, Rijeka
Attendance: 50
Referees: Lovšin, Kolar, Grbić

10 February 2016
18:00

Report

Čelik Zenica	59–55	Triglav Kranj
Scoring by quarter: 16:11, 17:9, 13:20, 13:15
Pts: Kapor 19; Rebs: Popović 13; Asts: Iriškić 5		Pts: Jevtović 14; Rebs: three players 8 Asts: Žibert 6

Arena Zenica, Zenica
Attendance: 300
Referees: Šundić, Lučić, Radinović
