= 2015–16 MŽRKL Group A =

Group A of the MŽRKL took place between 7 October 2015 and it will end on 23 December 2015.

The three best ranked teams advanced to the League 6.

== Standings ==
| Place | Team | Pld | W | L | PF | PA | Diff | Pts | |
|---|---|---|---|---|---|---|---|---|---|
| 1. | (Serbia) Radivoj Korać | 10 | 10 | 0 | 778 | 568 | +210 | 20 | League 6 |
| 2. | (Croatia) Medveščak | 10 | 7 | 3 | 693 | 641 | +52 | 17 | League 6 |
| 3. | (Slovenia) Triglav Kranj | 10 | 6 | 4 | 679 | 677 | +2 | 16 | League 6 |
| 4. | (Slovenia) Grosuplje | 10 | 4 | 6 | 639 | 612 | +27 | 14 | |
| 5. | (Bosnia and Herzegovina) Play Off Happy | 10 | 3 | 7 | 672 | 706 | -34 | 13 | |
| 6. | (North Macedonia) Badel 1862 | 10 | 0 | 10 | 529 | 786 | -257 | 10 | |

== Fixtures and results ==
All times given below are in Central European Time.

=== Game 1 ===
8 October 2015
19:00

Report

| Triglav Kranj | 72–66 | Medveščak |
Scoring by quarter: 10:20, 19:15, 26:20, 17:11
| Pts: Jesenšek 18; Rebs: Zdolšek 14; Asts: Meden 5 | | Pts: Borović 21; Rebs: Majstorović, Premasunac 8 Asts: Petrak, Džankić 3 |

Športna dvorana Planina, Kranj
Attendance: 200
Referees: Adamovič, Babić, Šabot

7 October 2015
19:30

Report

| Radivoj Korać | 95–46 | Badel 1862 |
Scoring by quarter: 29:3, 26:13, 24:21, 16:9
| Pts: N. Vučković 16; Rebs: Ilić 8 Asts: Mandić, Spaić 3 | | Pts: Luković 18; Rebs: Trajčevska, Luković 5 Asts: Trajčevska, Lazareska 3 |

SC Šumice, Belgrade
Attendance: 200
Referees: Čavara, Karović, Avdić

8 October 2015
18:00

Report

| Play Off Happy | 60–77 | Grosuplje |
Scoring by quarter: 21:25, 18:16, 12:22, 9:14
| Pts: Džebo 20; Rebs: Babić, Marković 7 Asts: Babić 5 | | Pts: Okoye 20; Rebs: Okoye 10; Asts: Đurić 9 |

KSC Skenderija, Sarajevo
Attendance: 200
Referees: Jevtović, Vešković, Prpa

=== Game 2 ===
14 October 2015
18:30

Report

| Medveščak | 68–63 | Grosuplje |
Scoring by quarter: 12:19, 15:15, 25:17, 16:12
| Pts: Borović 21; Rebs: Majstorović 8 Asts: three players 4 | | Pts: Okoye 14; Rebs: Okoye 10; Asts: Đurić 6 |

ŠD Peščenica, Zagreb
Attendance: 100
Referees: Čavara, Karović, Luković

14 October 2015
19:00

Report

| Badel 1862 | 50–85 | Play Off Happy |
'Scoring by quarter: 10:24, 10:25, 14:17, 16:19
| Pts: three players 12; Rebs: Luković 17; Asts: Lazareska 4 | | Pts: A. Delić 16; Rebs: Džebo 6 Asts: Babić 8 |

SRC Kale, Skopje
Attendance: 200
Referees: Popović, Savović, Radinović

15 October 2015
19:00

Report

| Triglav Kranj | 61–72 | Radivoj Korać |
Scoring by quarter: 16:23, 8:17, 17:21, 20:11
| Pts: Žibert 13; Rebs: Zdolšek, Žibert 7 Asts: Žibert 3 | | Pts: Mandić 22; Rebs: Mandić 7 Asts: Mandić 10 |

Športna dvorana Planina, Kranj
Attendance: 150
Referees: Tomič, Palavra, Marvnica

=== Game 3 ===
21 October 2015
18:30

Report

| Radivoj Korać | 77–48 | Medveščak |
Scoring by quarter: 24:14, 8:23, 24:2, 21:11
| Pts: Topuzović 16; Rebs: Topuzović 11; Asts: Mandić 8 | | Pts: Bura 14; Rebs: Premasunac 9 Asts: Premasunac 3 |

SC Šumice, Belgrade
Attendance: 500
Referees: Tokić, Kasumović, Dejanović

22 October 2015
18:00

Report

| Play Off Happy | 73–83 | Triglav Kranj |
Scoring by quarter: 27:19, 10:20, 16:24, 20:20
| Pts: Babić 24; Rebs: Džebo 6 Asts: Babić, A. Delić 4 | | Pts: Zdolšek, Jesenšek 16; Rebs: Zdolšek 7 Asts: Žibert 5 |

KSC Skenderija, Sarajevo
Attendance: 150
Referees: Ninković, Arsenijević, Virijević

22 October 2015
20:45

Report

| Grosuplje | 83–57 | Badel 1862 |
Scoring by quarter: 20:16, 17:12, 25:15, 21:14
| Pts: Gabrijel 17; Rebs: three players 6 Asts: Gabrijel 6 | | Pts: D. Jolović 16; Rebs: Lazareska 6 Asts: Lazareska 3 |

ŠD Brinje, Grosuplje
Attendance: 30
Referees: Tomić, Peić, Jež

=== Game 4 ===
23 October 2015
18:30

Report

| Medveščak | 85–54 | Badel 1862 |
Scoring by quarter: 35:14, 28:5, 12:12, 10:23
| Pts: Borović, Radoš 17; Rebs: Premasunac 9 Asts: Premasunac 7 | | Pts: Luković 17; Rebs: Luković 12; Asts: Lazareska 8 |

ŠD Peščenica, Zagreb
Attendance: 150
Referees: Poljanšek, Španić, Mauer

29 October 2015
19:00

Report

| Triglav Kranj | 64–48 | Grosuplje |
Scoring by quarter: 16:9, 19:10, 20:19, 9:10
| Pts: Zdolšek 13; Rebs: Seničar 8 Asts: Žibert, Meden 4 | | Pts: Okoye 15; Rebs: Okoye, Terry 5 Asts: Okoye, Đurić 4 |

Športna dvorana Planina, Kranj
Attendance: 120
Referees: Vučkovič, Špendl, Vuga

29 October 2015
19:30

Report

| Radivoj Korać | 84–50 | Play Off Happy |
Scoring by quarter: 28:14, 17:10, 26:14, 13:12
| Pts: Topuzović 20; Rebs: Topuzović 8 Asts: Mandić 7 | | Pts: A. Delić 13; Rebs: Babić 7 Asts: Babić, N. Delić 5 |

SC Šumice, Belgrade
Attendance: 150
Referees: Tresoglavić, Lesko, Mikulić

=== Game 5 ===
5 November 2015
18:00

Report

| Play Off Happy | 67–87 | Medveščak |
Scoring by quarter: 13:33, 16:17, 20:28, 18:9
| Pts: Babić 16; Rebs: Marković 5 Asts: A. Delić 5 | | Pts: Borović 20; Rebs: Majstorović 8 Asts: three players |

KSC Skenderija, Sarajevo
Attendance: 100
Referees: Savović, Šutulović, Kićović

5 November 2015
20:45

Report

| Grosuplje | 54–66 | Radivoj Korać |
Scoring by quarter: 13:19, 18:19, 14:19, 9:9
| Pts: Terry 14; Rebs: Terry 7 Asts: Đurić 4 | | Pts: Mandić 14; Rebs: Topuzović 15; Asts: Mandić 3 |

ŠD Brinje, Grosuplje
Referees: Prpić, Galiot, Marunica

4 November 2015
19:00

Report

| Badel 1862 | 55–82 | Triglav Kranj |
Scoring by quarter: 17:18, 13:23, 16:14, 9:27
| Pts: Luković 16; Rebs: Luković 11; Asts: Leskaroska 6 | | Pts: Žibert 17; Rebs: Zdolšek 9 Asts: Meden 7 |

SRC Kale, Skopje
Attendance: 200
Referees: Popović, Vujičić, Radinović

=== Game 6 ===
11 November 2015
18:30

Report

| Medveščak | 72–59 | Triglav Kranj |
Scoring by quarter: 23:18, 10:13, 27:17, 12:11
| Pts: Premasunac 21; Rebs: Premasunac 9 Asts: three players 3 | | Pts: Zdolšek 16; Rebs: Jevtović 10; Asts: Zdolšek, Meden 4 |

ŠD Peščenica, Zagreb
Attendance: 100
Referees: Adamović, Babić, Šobot

12 November 2015
18:00

Report

| Badel 1862 | 58–69 | Radivoj Korać |
Scoring by quarter: 10:26, 13:15, 18:20, 17:8
| Pts: Luković 16; Rebs: Stojanovska 7 Asts: Lazareska 4 | | Pts: N. Vučković, Vasović 12; Rebs: Vasović 8 Asts: L. Vučković, Mandić 3 |

SRC Kale, Skopje
Attendance: 100
Referees: Savović, Radinović, Srdanović

12 November 2015
20:45

Report

| Grosuplje | 48–62 | Play Off Happy |
Scoring by quarter: 15:7, 9:17, 12:25, 12:13
| Pts: Okoye 12; Rebs: Okoye 11; Asts: Đurić 5 | | Pts: Babić 17; Rebs: A. Delić 6 Asts: Babić 6 |

ŠD Brinje, Grosuplje
Attendance: 40
Referees: Peić, Palavra, Glavurdić

=== Game 7 ===
3 December 2015
20:45

Report

| Grosuplje | 64–69 | Medveščak |
Scoring by quarter: 15:14, 16:11, 12:28, 21:16
| Pts: Abramovič 20; Rebs: Abramovič 8 Asts: Gjerkes 5 | | Pts: Premasunac 18; Rebs: Premasunac 14; Asts: Borović 5 |

ŠD Brinje, Grosuplje
Attendance: 50
Referees: Adamović, Saša, Šobot

3 December 2015
18:00

Report

| Play Off Happy | 70–55 | Badel 1862 |
Scoring by quarter: 21:17, 24:12, 16:13, 9:13
| Pts: Babić 17; Rebs: Džebo 10; Asts: Babić 6 | | Pts: Luković 21; Rebs: Luković 12; Asts: Sekuloska 7 |

Sport Hall Sarajevo, Sarajevo
Attendance: 100
Referees: Vesković, Arsenijević, Virijević

2 December 2015
18:00

Report

| Radivoj Korać | 103–69 | Triglav Kranj |
Scoring by quarter: 28:13, 29:12, 27:16, 19:28
| Pts: Mandić 20; Rebs: Bučevac 7 Asts: Mandić 10 | | Pts: Jevtović 17; Rebs: Zdolšek 7 Asts: Zdolšek, Žibert 4 |

SC Šumice, Belgrade
Attendance: 100
Referees: Tresoglavić, Lesko, Mikulić

=== Game 8 ===
9 December 2015
18:30

Report

| Medveščak | 52–62 | Radivoj Korać |
Scoring by quarter: 10:15, 15:13, 19:20, 8:14
| Pts: Premasunac 16; Rebs: Premasunac 12; Asts: Majstorović, Tadić 3 | | Pts: Mandić 28; Rebs: Erak 13; Asts: three players 3 |

ŠD Peščenica, Zagreb
Attendance: 100
Referees: Poljanšek, Javor, Španić

10 December 2015
19:00

Report

| Triglav Kranj | 70–62 | Play Off Happy |
Scoring by quarter: 19:15, 20:9, 11:22, 20:16
| Pts: Zdolšek 22; Rebs: Zdolšek 8 Asts: Žibert 3 | | Pts: Džebo 19; Rebs: A. Delić, N. Delić 8 Asts: Džebo 4 |

Športna dvorana Planina, Kranj
Attendance: 120
Referees: Šušanj, Dalibor, Baki

9 December 2015
19:00

Report

| Badel 1862 | 50–70 | Grosuplje |
Scoring by quarter: 14:24, 8:12, 10:22, 18:12
| Pts: Luković 19; Rebs: Luković 13; Asts: Sekuloska 8 | | Pts: Abramovič 16; Rebs: Abramovič, Terry 5 Asts: three players 2 |

SRC Kale, Skopje
Attendance: 100
Referees: Vujičić, Radinović, Orbović

=== Game 9 ===
16 December 2015
19:00

Report

| Badel 1862 | 54–71 | Medveščak |
Scoring by quarter: 17:19, 17:22, 10:14, 10:16
| Pts: Luković 12; Rebs: Luković 13; Asts: Stojanovska, Lazareska 3 | | Pts: Borović 19; Rebs: Majstorović 8 Asts: Borović 4 |

SRC Kale, Skopje
Attendance: 100
Referees: Radinović, Šutilović, Radinović

17 December 2015
19:20

Report

| Grosuplje | 76–43 | Triglav Kranj |
Scoring by quarter: 21:12, 22:12, 12:7, 21:12
| Pts: Gabrijel 27; Rebs: Abramovič 9 Asts: Abramovič 8 | | Pts: Žibert 14; Rebs: Zdolšek, Jakobčić 4 Asts: Meden 2 |

ŠD Brinje, Grosuplje
Attendance: 50
Referees: Vučković, Gajšek, Vuga

17 December 2015
19:00

Report

| Play Off Happy | 74–77 (OT) | Radivoj Korać |
Scoring by quarter: 22:17, 8:20, 18:10, 20:21, Overtime: 6:13
| Pts: Džebo 23; Rebs: Babić 10; Asts: Babić 7 | | Pts: Mandić 21; Rebs: Mandić, Erak 9 Asts: Mandić 5 |

Sport Hall Sarajevo, Sarajevo
Attendance: 100
Referees: Savović, Vujičić, Orbović

=== Game 10 ===
22 December 2015
19:30

Report

| Medveščak | 75–69 | Play Off Happy |
Scoring by quarter: 24:15, 14:21, 19:20, 18:13
| Pts: Premasunac 26; Rebs: Premasunac 15; Asts: Majstorović 4 | | Pts: Babić 28; Rebs: Džebo 7 Asts: N. Delić 6 |

ŠD Peščenica, Zagreb
Attendance: 100
Referees: Lovšin, Kolar, Grbić

23 December 2015
18:00

Report

| Radivoj Korać | 73–56 | Grosuplje |
Scoring by quarter: 16:13, 16:12, 24:18, 17:13
| Pts: Vasović 24; Rebs: Bučevac 11; Asts: Spasojević, L. Vučković 4 | | Pts: Gjerkeš 31; Rebs: Zupan 6 Asts: Gabrijel 5 |

SC Šumice, Belgrade
Attendance: 100
Referees: Adamović, Babić, Dejanović

22 December 2015
19:00

Report

| Triglav Kranj | 76–50 | Badel 1862 |
Scoring by quarter: 17:10, 15:11, 18:11, 26:18
| Pts: Žibert 19; Rebs: Zdolšek 13; Asts: Žibert 9 | | Pts: Trajčevska 17; Rebs: Luković 13; Asts: Stojanovska 3 |

Športna dvorana Planina, Kranj
Attendance: 150
Referees: Tomič, Vukojević, Mustapić
