= 2016–17 WABA League Final Four =

Final Four to be played from 18–19 March 2017 in Podgorica, Montenegro.

== Semifinals ==
18 March 2017
17:00

Report

Montana 2003	74–85	Athlete Celje
Scoring by quarter: 12:20, 23:24, 19:23, 20:18
Pts: Dimitrova 25; Rebs: Allen 8 Asts: Stoycheva 5		Pts: Prezelj 27; Rebs: Ocvirk 10; Asts: Prezelj 6

University Sports & Culture Hall, Podgorica
Attendance: 200
Referees: Tomić, Dragojević, Šundić

18 March 2017
19:30

Report

Beroe	66–64	Budućnost Bemax
Scoring by quarter: 16:22, 22:19, 12:12, 16:11
Pts: Reid 22; Rebs: Reid 11; Asts: Kostova, Reid 5		Pts: Matović 21; Rebs: Fall 13; Asts: Mujović 4

University Sports & Culture Hall, Podgorica
Attendance: 450
Referees: Juras, Mrdak, Jevtović

== For third place ==
19 March 2017
14:30

Report

Montana 2003	41–44	Budućnost Bemax
Scoring by quarter: 7:9, 16:16, 9:12, 9:7
Pts: Peteva 11; Rebs: Burdgess 8 Asts: Allen 4		Pts: Babić 11; Rebs: Matović 9 Asts: Matović 3

University Sports & Culture Hall, Podgorica
Attendance: 257
Referees: Tomić, Mrdak, Jevtović

== Final ==
19 March 2017
17:00

Report

Athlete Celje	61–57	Beroe
Scoring by quarter: 18:9, 18:12, 14:11, 11:25
Pts: Evans 16; Rebs: Ocvirk 17; Asts: Ocvirk 5		Pts: Reid 19; Rebs: Reid 9 Asts: Perkins 4

University Sports & Culture Hall, Podgorica
Attendance: 437
Referees: Juras, Dragojević, Šundić

== Bracket ==
Semi-finals; 18 March
(Bulgaria) Montana 2003	74
(Slovenia) Athlete Celje	85
(Bulgaria) Beroe	66
(Montenegro) Budućnost Bemax	64

Final; 19 March
(Slovenia) Athlete Celje	61
(Bulgaria) Beroe	57
Third place
(Bulgaria) Montana 2003	41
(Montenegro) Budućnost Bemax	44

2016–17 WABA League

Athlete Celje
2nd Title
