= 2016–17 WABA League =

- League: Adriatic League
- Sport: Basketball
- Duration: 5 October 2016 – 19 March 2017
- Games: 58
- Teams: 10
- Total attendance: 13157 (missing data for some matches)
- TV partner: (Montenegro) RTCG

2016–17
- Season champions: (Slovenia) Athlete Celje (2nd title)

WABA League seasons
- ← 2015–16 2017–18 →

WABA League for the season 2016–17 was the sixteenth season of the Adriatic League. Competition included ten teams from six countries. In this season participating clubs from Serbia, Montenegro, Bosnia and Herzegovina, Bulgaria, Slovenia and from Macedonia. WABA League for the season 2016–17 has begun to play October 2016. and ended in March 2017.

It was originally intended that in group A play Nikšić 1995 from Montenegro, but after giving up this team, in its place was moved from Group B team Play Off Happy in Bosnia and Herzegovina.

Team Play Off Sarajevo at the beginning of 2017 changed the general sponsor, and is the first part of the season appeared well Play Off Happy, and the other as Play Off Ultra.

== Team information ==
Country	Teams	Team	City	Venue (Capacity)
Serbia	3			
Serbia	3	Crvena zvezda	Belgrade	Basket city Hall (1.600)
Serbia	3	Partizan 1953	Belgrade	Sports Hall Ranko Žeravica (5.000); Hall Vizura Sport (1,500)
Serbia	3	Kraljevo	Kraljevo	Kraljevo Sports Hall (3.331)
Slovenia	2			
Slovenia	2	Athlete Celje	Celje	Dvorana Gimnazije Celje – Center (1.500)
Slovenia	2	Triglav Kranj	Kranj	Športna dvorana Planina (800)
Bulgaria	2			
Bulgaria	2	Montana 2003	Montana	Sports Hall Mladost
Bulgaria	2	Beroe	Stara Zagora	Municipal Hall (1.000)
Montenegro	1			
Montenegro	1	Budućnost Bemax	Podgorica	Morača Sports Center (4,570); University Sports&Culture Hall (770)
Bosnia and Herzegovina	1			
Bosnia and Herzegovina	1	Play Off Ultra	Sarajevo	Skenderija (5.616); Ramiz Salčin Hall (1.500)
(North Macedonia) Macedonia	1			
(North Macedonia) Macedonia	1	Badel 1862	Skopje	Nezavisna Makedonija (n / a); Sports Hall Vardar (n / a)

== Regular season ==
In the Regular season was played with 10 teams divided into 2 groups of 5 teams and play a dual circuit system, each with one game each at home and away. The four best teams in each group at the end of the regular season were placed in the League 8. The regular season began on 5 October 2016 and it will end on 11 January 2017.

=== Group A ===
Place	Team	Pld	W	L	PF	PA	Diff	Pts	
1.	(Bulgaria) Beroe	8	7	1	617	479	+138	15	League 8
2.	(Slovenia) Triglav Kranj	8	5	3	471	476	-5	13	League 8
3.	(Bosnia and Herzegovina) Play Off Ultra	8	4	4	545	556	-11	12	League 8
4.	(Serbia) Partizan 1953	8	3	5	560	576	-16	11	League 8
5.	(Serbia) Kraljevo	8	1	7	496	602	-106	9	

=== Group B ===
Place	Team	Pld	W	L	PF	PA	Diff	Pts	
1.	(Montenegro) Budućnost Bemax	8	6	2	631	510	+121	14	League 8
2.	(Bulgaria) Montana 2003	8	6	2	574	527	+47	14	League 8
3.	(Slovenia) Athlete Celje	8	6	2	652	547	+105	13	League 8
4.	(Serbia) Crvena zvezda	8	2	6	543	562	-19	10	League 8
5.	(North Macedonia) Badel 1862	8	0	8	396	650	-254	8	

== League 8 ==
In the League 8 was played with 8 teams and play a dual circuit system, each with one game each at home and away. The four best teams in League 8 at the end of the last round were placed on the Final Four. The regular season began on 18 January 2017 and it will end on 15 March 2017.

Place	Team	Pld	W	L	PF	PA	Diff	Pts	
1.	(Bulgaria) Montana 2003	14	10	4	1046	965	+81	24	Final Four
2.	(Bulgaria) Beroe	14	10	4	1039	910	+129	24	Final Four
3.	(Montenegro) Budućnost Bemax	14	10	4	986	857	+129	24	Final Four
4.	(Slovenia) Athlete Celje	14	9	5	1041	991	+50	23	Final Four
5.	(Serbia) Crvena zvezda	14	6	8	972	1044	-72	20	
6.	(Slovenia) Triglav Kranj (-1)	14	6	8	765	833	-68	19	
7.	(Bosnia and Herzegovina) Play Off Ultra	14	3	11	1005	1107	-102	17	
8.	(Serbia) Partizan 1953	14	2	12	889	1036	-147	16	

== Classification 9–12 ==
Classification 9–12 of the WABA League took place between 25 January 2017 and it will end on 9 February 2017. Due to the withdrawal of individual teams before the season starts, match for 11th place have been canceled. Before the start of matches to 9th place, Badel 1862 is withdrew from playing this stage of the competition.

=== Ninth place game ===
Team #1	Agg.	Team #2	1st leg	2nd leg
(Serbia) Kraljevo	40:0	(North Macedonia) Badel 1862	20:0	20:0

== Final four ==
Final Four to be played from 18 to 19 March 2017 in the Podgorica, Montenegro.

Semi-finals; 18 March
(Bulgaria) Montana 2003	74
(Slovenia) Athlete Celje	85
(Bulgaria) Beroe	66
(Montenegro) Budućnost Bemax	64

Final; 19 March
(Slovenia) Athlete Celje	61
(Bulgaria) Beroe	57
Third place
(Bulgaria) Montana 2003	41
(Montenegro) Budućnost Bemax	44

2016–17 WABA League

Athlete Celje
2nd Title

== Awards ==
- Final Four MVP: Annamaria Prezelj (177-SG-97) of (Slovenia) Athlete Celje
- Player of the Year: Monique Reid (185-PF-90) of (Bulgaria) Beroe
- Guard of the Year: Annamaria Prezelj (177-SG-97) of (Slovenia) Athlete Celje
- Forward of the Year: Monique Reid (185-PF-90) of (Bulgaria) Beroe
- Center of the Year: Shante Evans (184-F/C-91) of (Slovenia) Athlete Celje
- Defensive Player of the Year: Jazmine Perkins (178-G/F-89) of (Bulgaria) Beroe
- Most Improved Player of the Year: Nikolina Delić (184-SG-96) of (Bosnia and Herzegovina) Play Off Ultra
- Newcomer of the Year: Aleksandra Katanić (172-PG-97) of (Serbia) Crvena zvezda
- Coach of the Year: Damir Grgič of (Slovenia) Athlete Celje

1st Team

- PG: Charel Allen (181-G-86) of (Bulgaria) Montana 2003
- SG: Annamaria Prezelj (177-SG-97) of (Slovenia) Athlete Celje
- F: Monique Reid (185-PF-90) of (Bulgaria) Beroe
- PF: Kristina Topuzović (183-F/G-94) of (Montenegro) Budućnost Bemax
- C: Shante Evans (184-F/C-91) of (Slovenia) Athlete Celje

2nd Team

- PG: Božica Mujović (178-G-96) of (Montenegro) Budućnost Bemax
- SG: Nikolina Delić (184-SG-96) of (Bosnia and Herzegovina) Play Off Ultra
- F: Irena Matović (186-F-88) of (Montenegro) Budućnost Bemax
- F: Živa Zdolšek (178-F/G-89) of (Slovenia) Triglav Kranj
- C: Ivanka Matić (193-C/F-79) of (France) Tarbes Basket

All-Defensive Team

- G: Aleksandra Katanić (172-PG-97) of (Serbia) Crvena zvezda
- G: Jazmine Perkins (178-G/F-89) of (Bulgaria) Beroe
- F: Nikolina Delić (184-SG-96) of (Bosnia and Herzegovina) Play Off Ultra
- F: Monique Reid (185-PF-90) of (Bulgaria) Beroe
- C: Shante Evans (184-F/C-91) of (Slovenia) Athlete Celje

Honorable Mention

- Iva Slonjšak (183-SG-97) of (Slovenia) Athlete Celje
- Larisa Ocvirk (184-SF-97) of (Slovenia) Athlete Celje
- Radostina Dimitrova (181-SF-94) of (Bulgaria) Montana 2003
- Suzana Milovanović (185-PF-79) of (Serbia) Partizan 1953
- Anđela Delić (184-G-96) of (Bosnia and Herzegovina) Play Off Ultra

All-Newcomers Team

- G: Aleksandra Krošelj (168-PG-99) of (Slovenia) Athlete Celje
- G: Aleksandra Katanić (172-PG-97) of (Serbia) Crvena zvezda
- F: Snežana Bogićević (177-SG-97) of (Serbia) Crvena zvezda
- PF: Mina Đorđević (186-PF-99) of (Serbia) Crvena zvezda
- C: Nikolina Sofrić (186-F/C-00) of (Slovenia) Triglav Kranj
