= 2014–15 MŽRKL =

- League: Adriatic League
- Sport: Basketball
- Duration: 21 October 2013 – 15 March 2015
- Games: 73
- Teams: 12
- Total attendance: 2.400 (at Final Four)
- TV partner: (Montenegro) RTCG

2014–15
- Season champions: (Italy) Umana Reyer Venezia (1st title)
- Season MVP: (Bosnia and Herzegovina) Marica Gajić
- Top scorer: (United States) Haleigh Lankster

WABA League seasons
- ← 2013–14 2015–16 →

MŽRKL League for the season 2014–15 was the fourteenth season of the Adriatic League. Competition included fourteen teams from seven countries. In this season participating clubs from Serbia, Montenegro, Bosnia and Herzegovina, Croatia, Slovenia, Italy and from Macedonia. MŽRKL League for the season 2014–15 began on 22 October 2014. and ended on 4 March 2015, when he it was completed a Quarterfinals. Final Four was played from 14 to 15 March 2015.

As a Cadet MŽRKL League last two season a success, the Board of league decided to continue playing Cadet MŽRKL League and founded Pionir MŽRKL League. Cadet MŽRKL League comprises 12 teams, where each team plays each at once. One team is organizing a mini tournament where four teams play two rounds of the league for a weekend and so once a month. Top 4 teams qualify for the Final Four to be played in the same place for seniors and the same weekend play. Pionir MŽRKL League comprises 13 teams, where each team plays each at once. One team is organizing a mini tournament where four teams play two rounds of the league for a weekend and so once a month. Top 4 teams qualify for the Final Four to be played in the same place for seniors and the same weekend play.

== Team information ==
Country	Teams	Team	City	Venue (Capacity)
Slovenia	3			
Slovenia	3	Athlete Celje	Celje	Dvorana Gimnazije Celje – Center (1,500)
Slovenia	3	Grosbasket	Grosuplje	ŠD Brinje (600)
Slovenia	3	Triglav Kranj	Kranj	Športna dvorana Planina (800)
Serbia	2			
Serbia	2	Partizan	Belgrade	Hall Vizura Sport (1,500)
Serbia	2	Radivoj Korać	Belgrade	Sport EKO Hall (1,000)
Bosnia and Herzegovina	2			
Bosnia and Herzegovina	2	Čelik	Zenica	Arena Zenica (6,200)
Bosnia and Herzegovina	2	Play Off Happy	Sarajevo	Sport Hall Sarajevo (800)
Croatia	2			
Croatia	2	Medveščak	Zagreb	ŠD Peščenica (600)
Croatia	2	Trešnjevka 2009	Zagreb	Športska dvorana Trešnjevka (5,000)
Montenegro	1	Budućnost Volcano	Podgorica	Morača Sports Center (4,570)
Italy	1	Umana Reyer Venezia	Venice	Taliercio (3,500)
(North Macedonia) Macedonia	1	Badel 1862	Skopje	SRC Kale (2,500)

== Regular season ==
In the Regular season was played with 12 teams divided into 2 groups of 6 teams and play a dual circuit system, each with one game each at home and away. The four best teams in each group at the end of the regular season were placed in the Quarterfinals. The regular season began on 21 October 2014. and it will end on 12 February 2015.

=== Group A ===
Place	Team	Pld	W	L	PF	PA	Diff	Pts	
1.	(Montenegro) Budućnost Volcano	10	8	2	749	645	+104	18	Quarterfinals
2.	(Italy) Umana Reyer Venezia	10	8	2	696	529	+167	18	Quarterfinals
3.	(Croatia) Medveščak	10	8	2	700	606	+94	18	Quarterfinals
4.	(Slovenia) Triglav Kranj	10	4	6	633	684	-51	14	Quarterfinals
5.	(Serbia) Partizan	10	2	8	577	675	-98	12	
6.	(Bosnia and Herzegovina) Play Off Happy	10	0	10	616	832	-216	10	

1. round
(26.10.)	Budućnost - Triglav	71:62
(22.10.)	Partizan - Play Off	84:51

2. round
(30.10.)	Triglav - Partizan	50:47
(29.10.)	Medveščak - Budućnost	71:67

3. round
(5.11.)	Budućnost - Reyer	64:69
(5.11.)	Partizan - Medveščak	49:67
(5.11.)	Play Off - Triglav	69:75

4. round
(12.11.)	Medveščak - Play Off	91:57
(12.11.)	Reyer - Partizan	76:50

5. round
(19.11.)	Play Off - Reyer	43:89
(20.11.)	Triglav - Medveščak	63:67

6. round
(26.11.)	Reyer - Triglav	82:49
(27.11.)	Budućnost - Partizan	76:45

7. round
(6.12.)	Play Off - Budućnost	78:85
(3.11.)	Medveščak - Reyer	60:46

8. round
(11.12.)	Triglav – Budućnost	80:82
(11.12.)	Play Off – Partizan	67:71

9. round
(17.12.)	Partizan – Triglav	63:67
(18.12.)	Budućnost – Medveščak	76:66

10. round
(14.1.)	Reyer – Budućnost	51:58
(14.1.)	Medveščak – Partizan	72:53
(15.1.)	Triglav – Play Off	77:71

11. round; (22.1.) / Play Off – Medveščak / 69:88; (21.1.) / Partizan – Reyer / 53:73	12. round; (28.1.) / Reyer – Play Off / 78:50; (28.1.) / Medveščak – Triglav / 71:55	13. round; (4.2.) / Triglav – Reyer / 55:61; (4.2.) / Partizan – Budućnost / 62:76	14. round; (12.2.) / Budućnost – Play Off / 94:61; (11.2.) / Reyer – Medveščak / 71:47

=== Group B ===
Place	Team	Pld	W	L	PF	PA	Diff	Pts	
1.	(Slovenia) Athlete Celje	10	9	1	856	597	+259	19	Quarterfinals
2.	(Serbia) Radivoj Korać	10	9	1	794	643	+151	19	Quarterfinals
3.	(Bosnia and Herzegovina) Čelik Zenica	10	6	4	680	591	+89	16	Quarterfinals
4.	(Slovenia) Grosbasket	10	6	7	628	686	-58	16	Quarterfinals
5.	(Croatia) Trešnjevka 2009	10	3	7	555	795	-240	16	
6.	(North Macedonia) Badel 1862	10	0	10	513	714	-201	10	

1. round; (21.10.) / Badel 1862 - Trešnjevka / 49:72; (23.10.) / Athlete Celje - Grosbasket / 82:71	2. round; (29.10.) / Trešnjevka - Athlete Celje / 49:88; (29.10.) / Radivoj Korać - Badel 1862 / 67:55	3. round; (6.11.) / Athlete Celje - Radivoj Korać / 97:65; (5.11.) / Čelik - Grosbasket / 75:64	4. round; (12.11.) / Trešnjevka - Čelik / 39:82; (12.11.) / Badel 1862 - Athlete Celje / 55:82	5. round; (19.11.) / Čelik - Radivoj Korać / 62:63; (20.11.) / Grosbasket - Trešnjevka / 69:54

6. round
(26.11.)	Radivoj Korać - Grosbasket	95:71
(26.11.)	Badel 1862 - Čelik	45:65

7. round
(3.12.)	Čelik - Athlete Celje	73:81
(4.11.)	Grosbasket - Badel 1862	63:50
(3.11.)	Trešnjevka - Radivoj Korać	59:92

8. round
(5.12.)	Trešnjevka – Badel 1862	61:57
(11.12.)	Grosbasket – Athlete Celje	46:73

9. round
(17.12.)	Athlete Celje – Trešnjevka	126:61
(10.12.)	Badel 1862 – Radivoj Korać	35:70

10. round
(14.1.)	Radivoj Korać – Athlete Celje	73:68
(15.1.)	Grosbasket – Čelik	45:62

11. round
(21.1.)	Čelik – Trešnjevka	76:48
(24.1.)	Athlete Celje – Badel 1862	91:53

12. round
(28.1.)	Radivoj Korać – Čelik	83:68
(28.1.)	Trešnjevka – Grosbasket	54:52

13. round
(5.2.)	Grosbasket – Radivoj Korać	70:82
(5.2.)	Čelik – Badel 1862	65:53

14. round
(11.2.)	Athlete Celje – Čelik	68:51
(11.2.)	Badel 1862 – Grosbasket	59:77
(11.2.)	Radivoj Korać - Trešnjevka	104:58

== Quarterfinals ==
In the quarterfinals, teams play until one team arrives first to 2 wins. The winning quarterfinalists were placed in the Final Four. The quarterfinals began on 18 February 2015. and it will end on 4 March 2015.

club 1	result	club 2
Quarterfinals
(Montenegro) Budućnost Volcano	2:0	(Slovenia) Grosbasket
(Italy) Umana Reyer Venezia	2:0	(Bosnia and Herzegovina) Čelik Zenica
(Slovenia) Athlete Celje	2:0	(Slovenia) Triglav Kranj
(Serbia) Radivoj Korać	2:1	(Croatia) Medveščak

1. leg
(19.2.)	Budućnost – Grosbasket	72:50
(18.2.)	Reyer Venezia – Čelik Zenica	74:49
(19.2.)	Athlete Celje – Triglav	72:53
(19.2.)	Radivoj Korać – Medveščak	65:67

2. leg
(26.2.)	Grosbasket – Budućnost	55:74
(25.2.)	Čelik Zenica – Reyer Venezia	63:67
(26.2.)	Triglav – Athlete Celje	51:79
(25.2.)	Medveščak – Radivoj Korać	69:75

3. leg
(4.3.)	Radivoj Korać – Medveščak	72:48

== Final four ==
Final Four to be played from 14 to 15 March 2015. in the Dvorana Gimnazije Celje – Center in Celje, Slovenia.

=== Semifinals ===
March 14
17:15

Report

Radivoj Korać	65–63	Budućnost Volcano
Scoring by quarter: 14:25, 27:14, 17:14, 7:10
Pts: three players 15; Rebs: Topuzović, Mandić 10; Asts: Mandić 6		Pts: Popović 26; Rebs: Matović 8 Asts: Sanders 3

Dvorana Gimnazije Celje – Center, Celje
Attendance: 400
Referees: Majkić, Poljanšek, Tomić

March 14
19:30

Report

Athlete Celje	79–83 (OT)	Umana Reyer Venezia
Scoring by quarter: 11:11, 14:13, 15:18, 21:19, Overtime: 18:22
Pts: Abramovič 20; Rebs: Gajić 14; Asts: Erkić 7		Pts: McCallum 20; Rebs: Henry, McCallum 7 Asts: Ruzickova 4

Dvorana Gimnazije Celje – Center, Celje
Attendance: 1.000
Referees: Juras Tatić, Čavara, Karović

=== For third place ===
March 15
15:30

Report

Athlete Celje	75–76 (OT)	Budućnost Volcano
Scoring by quarter: 10:23, 22:9, 12:20, 23:15, Overtime: 8:9
Pts: Erkić 30; Rebs: Lisec 11; Asts: Dojkić 4		Pts: Sanders 25; Rebs: Radunović 9 Asts: four players 2

Dvorana Gimnazije Celje – Center, Celje
Attendance: 500
Referees: Juras Tatić, Čavara, Karović

=== Final ===
March 15
18:00

Report

Radivoj Korać	52–69	Umana Reyer Venezia
Scoring by quarter: 17:19, 12:16, 9:21, 14:13
Pts: Kapor 12; Rebs: Erak 8 Asts: Mandić 4		Pts: Henry 16; Rebs: Henry 10; Asts: McCallum 4

Dvorana Gimnazije Celje – Center, Celje
Attendance: 500
Referees: Majkić, Nedović, Poljanšek

=== Bracket ===
club 1	result	club 2
semifinals
(Serbia) Radivoj Korać	65:63	(Montenegro) Budućnost Volcano
(Slovenia) Athlete Celje	79:83	(Italy) Umana Reyer Venezia
for third place
(Slovenia) Athlete Celje	75:76	(Montenegro) Budućnost Volcano
final
(Serbia) Radivoj Korać	52:69	(Italy) Umana Reyer Venezia

2014–15 MŽRKL

Umana Reyer Venezia
1st Title

== Awards ==
- Final Four MVP: Shannon McCallum (177-G-87) of Umana Reyer Venezia (Italy)
- Player of the Year: Marica Gajić (187-C-95) of Athlete Celje (Slovenia)
- Guard of the Year: Jovana Popović (173-PG-90) of Budućnost Volcano (Montenegro)
- Forward of the Year: Irena Matović (186-F-88) of Budućnost Volcano (Montenegro)
- Center of the Year: Marica Gajić (187-C-95) of Athlete Celje (Slovenia)
- Best Young Player: Sanja Mandić (178-SG-95) of Radivoj Korać (Serbia)
- Defensive Player of the Year: Rebeka Abramovič (172-PG-93) of Athlete Celje (Slovenia)
- Coach of the Year: Andrea Liberalotto of Umana Reyer Venezia (Italy)

1st Team

- PG: Jovana Popović (173-PG-90) of Budućnost Volcano (Montenegro)
- SG: Sanja Mandić (178-SG-95) of Radivoj Korać (Serbia)
- F: Irena Matović (186-F-88) of Budućnost Volcano (Montenegro)
- C Ivana Tikvić (189-C-94) of Medveščak (Croatia)
- C: Marica Gajić (187-C-95) of Athlete Celje (Slovenia)

2nd Team

- PG: Rebeka Abramovič (172-PG-93) of Athlete Celje (Slovenia)
- PG: Shanasa Sanders (170-PG-89) of Budućnost Volcano (Montenegro)
- G: Iva Borović (170-G-88) of Medveščak (Croatia)
- G/F: Maja Erkič (183-G/F-85) of Athlete Celje (Slovenia)
- C: Eva Lisec (192-C-95) of Athlete Celje (Slovenia)

Honorable Mention

- Marie Růžičková (189-C-86) of Umana Reyer Venezia (Italy)
- Shannon McCallum (177-G-87) of Umana Reyer Venezia (Italy)
- Ana-Marija Begić (190-C-94) of Medveščak (Croatia)
- Živa Zdolšek (178-F/G-89) of Triglav Kranj (Slovenia)
- Bojana Janković (184-F-83) of Partizan (Serbia)
- Tamara Kapor (184-G-91) of Radivoj Korać (Serbia)
- Jasmina Bigović (174-G-79) of Čelik Zenica (Bosnia and Herzegovina)
- Anita Kelava (185-PF-97) of Trešnjevka 2009 (Croatia)
- Haleigh Lankster (175-G-89) of Grosbasket (Slovenia)
