= 2020–21 WABA League Regular season =

The WABA League is a top-level regional basketball league, featuring female teams from Serbia, Montenegro, Bosnia and Herzegovina, Bulgaria, Slovenia. In the Regular season was played with 8 teams and play a dual circuit system, each with each one game at home and away. The four best teams at the end of the regular season were placed in the Final Four. The regular season began on 14 October 2020 and it will end on 4 March 2021.

Vojvodina 021 informed the Board of the WABA League 23 February 2021 that due to obligations in the national championship and the Serbian Cup, it is not able to play the remaining seven games of the 2020-21 WABA League regular season. It means that Vojvodina 021 withdraws from the 2020-21 WABA League.

As per the Official Basketball Rules, the games (played and unplayed) were awarded to their respective opponents with a score of 20-0. Furthermore, the forfeiting team Vojvodina 021 will receive 0 classification points in the standings.

== Standings ==
Pos	Team	Pld	W	L	PF	PA	PD	Pts	Qualification or relegation
1	(Bulgaria) Beroe	14	12	2	970	774	+196	26	Advance to the Final Four
2	(Montenegro) Budućnost Bemax	14	12	2	942	677	+265	26	Advance to the Final Four
3	(Slovenia) Cinkarna Celje	14	9	5	870	782	+88	23	Advance to the Final Four
4	(Bulgaria) Montana 2003	14	9	5	896	777	+119	23	Advance to the Final Four
5	(Bosnia and Herzegovina) Orlovi	14	7	7	861	830	+31	21	
6	(Serbia) Partizan 1953	14	4	10	782	981	−199	18	
7	(Bosnia and Herzegovina) RMU Banovići	14	3	11	774	994	−220	17	
8	(Serbia) Vojvodina 021	14	0	14	0	280	−280	14	

Updated to match(es) played on March 4, 2021. Source: WABA League

== Fixtures and results ==
All times given below are in Central European Time (for the matches played in Bulgaria is time expressed in Eastern European Time).

=== Game 1 ===
14 October 2020
17:00

Report

Orlovi	46–67	Budućnost Bemax
Scoring by quarter: 7:11, 17:16, 13:19, 9:21
Pts: Erak 16; Rebs: Gligić 8 Asts: Ristić 6		Pts: Mitrašinović 17; Rebs: Jakšić 11; Asts: Babić 6

Obilićevo Hall, Banja Luka
Attendance: 1
Referees: Holjevac, Lipovac, Lombar

14 October 2020
18:30

Report

Vojvodina 021	0–20	Partizan 1953
Scoring by quarter: 25:15, 23:10, 12:16, 18:18
Pts: Mišeljić 23; Rebs: four players 6 Asts: Le. Radulović 6		Pts: Luković 11; Rebs: Luković 6 Asts: Luković 3

Petrovaradin Hall, Novi Sad
Attendance: 20
Referees: Vlahović, Radosavljević, Đukić

12 December 2020
18:00

Report

Montana 2003	91–79	Beroe
Scoring by quarter: 22:15, 24:26, 22:20, 23:18
Pts: Lyra Ramona 29; Rebs: Lyra Ramona 10; Asts: Lyra Ramona 9		Pts: Dineva 19; Rebs: Zlatanova 9 Asts: Kocheva 6

Mladost Hall, Montana
Attendance: /
Referees: Pešić, Krstić, Kral

20 December 2020
15:30

Report

RMU Banovići	51–73	Cinkarna Celje
Scoring by quarter: 13:14, 10:18, 17:19, 11:22
Pts: Zeljković 20; Rebs: Marković 9 Asts: Prokić 3		Pts: Debeljak 15; Rebs: Gbemuotor 11; Asts: Čeh 5

Hall Gimnazija Center Celje, Celje
Attendance: /
Referees: Galiot, Rogić, Jež

=== Game 2 ===
15 January 2021
17:00

Report

Budućnost Bemax	70–55	Cinkarna Celje
Scoring by quarter: 21:10, 16:14, 17:21, 16:10
Pts: Jakšić 18; Rebs: Đorđević 12; Asts: Jakšić 5		Pts: Gbemuotor, Jelenc 11; Rebs: Gbemuotor, Seničar 4 Asts: Štirn 4

Bemax Arena, Podgorica
Attendance: 20
Referees: Bajgorić, Hasić, Bambur

11 October 2020
17:00

Report

Beroe	81–53	RMU Banovići
Scoring by quarter: 19:12, 18:10, 22:13, 22:18
Pts: Dimitrova, Ivanova 14; Rebs: Zlatanova 9 Asts: Kocheva, Ivanova 4		Pts: Ibrić 12; Rebs: Prokić, Karić 8 Asts: Karić 5

Municipal Hall, Stara Zagora
Attendance: /
Referees: Pešić, Miloradović, Mali

21 October 2020
16:00

Report

Partizan 1953	43–62	Montana 2003
Scoring by quarter: 11:18, 15:17, 10:13, 7:14
Pts: Vučković 11; Rebs: Luković 8 Asts: five players 2		Pts: Maize, Ivanova 14; Rebs: Aleksić 9 Asts: Aleksić 7

Sports centre Master, Belgrade
Attendance: /
Referees: Bajgorić, Hasić, Bambur

20 October 2020
16:30

Report

Orlovi	20–0	Vojvodina 021
Scoring by quarter: 22:24, 24:14, 21:15, 15:14
Pts: Erak 19; Rebs: Erak 17; Asts: Rajić 10		Pts: La. Radulović 22; Rebs: La. Radulović 12; Asts: Le. Radulović, Todorović 5

Obilićevo, Banja Luka
Attendance: 5
Referees: Katić, Grubišić, Holjevac

=== Game 3 ===
28 October 2020
17:45

Report

Vojvodina 021	0–20	Budućnost Bemax
Scoring by quarter: 12:26, 17:14, 8:20, 13:18
Pts: Opačić 14; Rebs: Miller-McCray 7 Asts: Adamović 3		Pts: Babić 18; Rebs: Bura 11; Asts: Mitrašinović 5

Petrovaradin Hall, Novi Sad
Attendance: 20
Referees: N. Nikšić, T. Nikšić, Samir Kadrić

28 October 2020
18:00

Report

Montana 2003	80–63	Orlovi
Scoring by quarter: 22:11, 20:19, 23:22, 15:11
Pts: Aleksić 23; Rebs: Georgieva 11; Asts: Aleksić 7		Pts: Gligić 17; Rebs: Erak 7 Asts: Ristić 6

Mladost Hall, Montana
Attendance: /
Referees: Matić, Kral, Kovačević

28 October 2020
18:00

Report

RMU Banovići	71–74	Partizan 1953
Scoring by quarter: 20:20, 25:13, 9:18, 17:23
Pts: Zeljković 25; Rebs: Prokić, Marković 7 Asts: Zeljković 5		Pts: Vučković 21; Rebs: Luković, Kovačević 5 Asts: /

SKC Banovići, Banovići
Attendance: /
Referees: Hartman, Barišić, Holjevac

28 October 2020
18:00

Report

Cinkarna Celje	50–61	Beroe
Scoring by quarter: 11:16, 13:11, 14:18, 12:16
Pts: Debeljak, Čeh 10; Rebs: Seničar 10; Asts: Čeh 4		Pts: Ivanova 18; Rebs: Kocheva 8 Asts: Kocheva 8

Hall Gimnazija Center Celje, Celje
Attendance: /
Referees: Terlević, Đuraki, Koraca

=== Game 4 ===
19 November 2020
18:00

Report

Budućnost Bemax	78–69	Beroe
Scoring by quarter: 13:20, 19:9, 28:17, 18:23
Pts: Đorđević 20; Rebs: Đorđević 10; Asts: Babić 6		Pts: Dineva 17; Rebs: Zlatanova 6 Asts: Dineva 7

Bemax Arena, Podgorica
Attendance: /
Referees: Bajgorić, Hasić, Bambur

3 March 2021
15:45

Report

Partizan 1953	57–92	Cinkarna Celje
Scoring by quarter: 13:19, 18:19, 17:31, 9:23
Pts: Vučković 21; Rebs: Luković 5 Asts: Stojić 6		Pts: Bogićević 25; Rebs: Garić 9 Asts: Čeh 11

Sports centre Master, Belgrade
Attendance: /
Referees: Miloradović, Kral, Kovačević

23 December 2020
17:00

Report

Orlovi	89–44	RMU Banovići
Scoring by quarter: 30:13, 25:11, 16:11, 18:9
Pts: Domuzin 26; Rebs: Rajić 11; Asts: Domuzin 9		Pts: Marković 14; Rebs: Prokić 6 Asts: Prokić 4

Obilićevo Hall, Banja Luka
Attendance: 5
Referees: Vlaho, Karačić, Šutalo

Report

Vojvodina 021	0–20	Montana 2003

Petrovaradin Hall, Novi Sad

=== Game 5 ===
26 November 2020
18:00

Report

Montana 2003	60–59	Budućnost Bemax
Scoring by quarter: 11:12, 25:10, 14:13, 10:24
Pts: Ramona 16; Rebs: Maize 10; Asts: Ramona 7		Pts: three players 11; Rebs: five players 4 Asts: Mitrašinović 8

Mladost Hall, Montana
Attendance: /
Referees: Miloradović, Dašić, Vlahović

12 January 2021
19:00

Report

RMU Banovići	20–0	Vojvodina 021
Scoring by quarter: 18:14, 19:19, 23:17, 18:16
Pts: Marković 23; Rebs: Marković 7 Asts: Prokić 17		Pts: Mišeljić 21; Rebs: Opačić 11; Asts: Jakovljević 5

SKC Banovići, Banovići
Attendance: /
Referees: Katić, Grubišić, Holjevac

21 November 2020
19:00

Report

Cinkarna Celje	82–67	Orlovi
Scoring by quarter: 22:12, 17:20, 20:15, 23:20
Pts: Bogićević 20; Rebs: Bartelme 7 Asts: Bartelme 5		Pts: Erak 18; Rebs: Erak, Rajić 6 Asts: Domuzin 6

Hall Gimnazija Center Celje, Celje
Attendance: /
Referees: Kovačević, Bogdanić, Totić

14 January 2021
14:00

Report

Beroe	86–68	Partizan 1953
Scoring by quarter: 22:14, 14:22, 28:15, 22:17
Pts: Dineva 20; Rebs: Zlatanova 9 Asts: Zlatanova 5		Pts: Vučković 17; Rebs: Marjanović 9 Asts: Stojić 4

Municipal Hall, Stara Zagora
Attendance: /
Referees: Matić, Kral, Kovačević

=== Game 6 ===
28 December 2020
17:00

Report

Budućnost Bemax	82–57	Partizan 1953
Scoring by quarter: 25:18, 22:16, 15:8, 20:15
Pts: Mitrašinović 14; Rebs: Živković 9 Asts: Jakšić 7		Pts: Luković 17; Rebs: Marjanović 6 Asts: Kovačević 4

Sports centre Master, Belgrade
Attendance: /
Referees: Pešić, Jovičin, Kral

24 February 2021
17:00

Report

Orlovi	64–73	Beroe
Pts: Domuzin 17; Rebs: Rajić 7 Asts: Ristić 4		Pts: Dineva 21; Rebs: Zlatanova 11; Asts: Zlatanova 7

Municipal Hall, Stara Zagora
Attendance: /
Referees: Holjevac, Grubišić, Lombar

Report

Vojvodina 021	0–20	Cinkarna Celje

Petrovaradin Hall, Novi Sad

13 February 2021
15:00

Report

Montana 2003	93–67	RMU Banovići
Scoring by quarter: 24:17, 27:12, 19:21, 23:17
Pts: Aleksić 21; Rebs: Ramona, Nikolova 9 Asts: Ramona 6		Pts: Marković 21; Rebs: Marković 10; Asts: Prokić 10

Mladost, Montana
Attendance: 20
Referees: Tomov, Tsvetanov, Petrov

=== Game 7 ===
10 December 2020
19:15

Report

RMU Banovići	46–94	Budućnost Bemax
Scoring by quarter: 10:25, 8:33, 12:18, 16:18
Pts: Ibrić 13; Rebs: Popović 5 Asts: Prokić 2		Pts: Bigović, Đorđević 14; Rebs: three players 7 Asts: Živković 7

SKC Banovići
Attendance: /
Referees: KatiĆ, Holjevac, Lipovac

8 December 2020
18:00

Report

Cinkarna Celje	78–72	Montana 2003
Scoring by quarter: 20:21, 25:16, 15:20, 18:15
Pts: Debeljak 20; Rebs: Seničar 7 Asts: Čeh 7		Pts: Ivanova 18; Rebs: Ivanova 10; Asts: Aleksić 8

Hall Gimnazija Center Celje, Celje
Attendance: /
Referees: Stanković, Lenac, Miletić

3 March 2021
16:00

Report

Beroe	20–0	Vojvodina 021

Municipal Hall, Stara Zagora

8 February 2021
17:45

Report

Partizan 1953	71–91	Orlovi
Scoring by quarter: 11:24, 22:30, 22:25, 16:12
Pts: Olić 19; Rebs: Luković 11; Asts: Stojić 8		Pts: Rajić 21; Rebs: Svitlica 9 Asts: Ristić 9

Sports centre Master, Belgrade
Attendance: 10
Referees: Hartman, Holjevac, Andrić

=== Game 8 ===
16 December 2020
17:30

Report

Budućnost Bemax	78–57	Orlovi
Scoring by quarter: 28:14, 13:12, 16:16, 21:15
Pts: Đorđević 15; Rebs: Bura 16; Asts: Mitrašinović 6		Pts: Domuzin 18; Rebs: Erak 8 Asts: Ristić 6

Bemax Arena, Podgorica
Attendance: 10
Referees: Matić, Dašić, Ilić

6 January 2021
14:00

Report

Partizan 1953	20–0	Vojvodina 021
Scoring by quarter: 8:13, 22:24, 16:21, 15:12
Pts: Luković 15; Rebs: Vučković 6 Asts: Jovanović 5		Pts: Adamović 23; Rebs: Podunavac 13; Asts: Radulović 6

Sports centre Master, Belgrade
Attendance: /
Referees: Vlahović, Mali, Petković

17 December 2020
18:00

Report

Beroe	73–54	Montana 2003
Scoring by quarter: 20:16, 18:4, 22:12, 13:22
Pts: Delić 17; Rebs: Zlatanova 9 Asts: Tavić 7		Pts: Georgieva 13; Rebs: Lyra Ramona, Georgieva6; Asts: Aleksić 5

Municipal Hall, Stara Zagora
Attendance: /
Referees: Miloradović, Kovačević, Pešić

19 December 2020
20:00

Report

Cinkarna Celje	79–68	RMU Banovići
Scoring by quarter: 15:14, 18:14, 26:14, 20:26
Pts: Bogićević 19; Rebs: three players 7 Asts: Bogićević 7		Pts: Zeljković 25; Rebs: Zeljković, Prokić 7 Asts: Prokić 6

Hall Gimnazija Center Celje
Attendance: /
Referees: Žagar, Zrnić, Komadina

=== Game 9 ===
16 January 2021
17:00

Report

Cinkarna Celje	49–68	Budućnost Bemax
Scoring by quarter: 11:17, 12:13, 15:19, 11:19
Pts: Jelenc 12; Rebs: Jelenc, Seničar 7 Asts: three players 3		Pts: Đorđević 16; Rebs: Đorđević 12; Asts: Babić 7

Bemax Arena, Podgorica
Attendance: 50
Referees: Bajgorić, Hasić, Bambur

12 October 2020
18:30

Report

RMU Banovići	65–84	Beroe
Scoring by quarter: 19:29, 16:26, 9:27, 21:12
Pts: Zeljković 18; Rebs: Zeljković 9 Asts: Zeljković 8		Pts: Kocheva, Dimitrova 14; Rebs: Karamfilova 6 Asts: Kocheva 7

Municipal Hall, Stara Zagora
Attendance: /
Referees: Pešić, Miloradović, Mali

11 January 2021
18:00

Report

Montana 2003	84–40	Partizan 1953
Scoring by quarter: 33:13, 14:7, 14:7, 23:13
Pts: Petrova 16; Rebs: Williams 12; Asts: Aleksić 7		Pts: Luković 12; Rebs: Luković 6 Asts: Jovanović 4

Arena Varshets, Varshets
Attendance: /
Referees: Vlahović, Petković, Živković

13 February 2021
16:30

Report

Vojvodina 021	0–20	Orlovi
Scoring by quarter: 25:23, 18:3, 22:24, 13:15
Pts: Adamović 19; Rebs: Mišeljić 9 Asts: Adamović 4		Pts: Rajić 33; Rebs: Erak 8 Asts: four players 2

Petrovaradin Hall, Novi Sad
Attendance: 18
Referees: Miloradović, Vlahović, Jovičin

=== Game 10 ===
Report

Budućnost Bemax	20–0	Vojvodina 021

Bemax Arena, Podgorica

20 January 2021
17:00

Report

Orlovi	69–64	Montana 2003
Scoring by quarter: 18:17, 25:17, 14:13, 12:17
Pts: Rajić 21; Rebs: Erak 16; Asts: three players 4		Pts: Aleksić 23; Rebs: Ramona 11; Asts: Aleksić 4

Obilićevo, Banja Luka
Attendance: 10
Referees: Hartman, Holjevac, Lipovac

21 January 2021
18:00

Report

Partizan 1953	86–75	RMU Banovići
Scoring by quarter: 14:16, 24:22, 31:18, 17:19
Pts: Olić 26; Rebs: Luković 15; Asts: Olić 7		Pts: Thompson 25; Rebs: Marković 11; Asts: Thompson 6

Sports centre Master, Belgrade
Attendance: /
Referees: Pešić, Vlahović, Kral

20 February 2021
14:00

Report

Beroe	73–71	Cinkarna Celje
Scoring by quarter: 17:21, 21:10, 16:19, 19:21
Pts: Kocheva 23; Rebs: Zlatanova 9 Asts: Tavić 5		Pts: Bogićević 19; Rebs: Ostojić 10; Asts: five players 2

Municipal Hall, Stara Zagora
Attendance: /
Referees: Pelja, Bajgorić, Džampo

=== Game 11 ===
26 January 2021
18:00

Report

Beroe	77–60	Budućnost Bemax
Scoring by quarter: 25:12, 18:19, 15:13, 19:16
Pts: Delić 15; Rebs: Boothe 16; Asts: four players 3		Pts: Babić 22; Rebs: Bura 8 Asts: Mitrašinović, Đorđević 4

Municipal Hall, Stara Zagora
Attendance: /
Referees: Matić, Radosavljević, Ilić

4 March 2021
15:45

Report

Cinkarna Celje	72–64	Partizan 1953
Scoring by quarter: 20:14, 16:16, 15:15, 21:19
Pts: Jelenc 13; Rebs: Jelenc 9 Asts: Čeh 8		Pts: Samardžić 17; Rebs: Marjanović, Luković 6 Asts: Stojić 7

Sports centre Master, Belgrade
Attendance: /
Referees: Pešić, Mali, Vlahov

26 January 2021
20:00

Report

RMU Banovići	67–60	Orlovi
Scoring by quarter: 27:26, 12:10, 15:12, 13:12
Pts: Lačić 21; Rebs: Marković 13; Asts: Prokić 5		Pts: Rajić 23; Rebs: Erak, Svitlica 11; Asts: Ristić 4

SKC Banovići, Banovići
Attendance: /
Referees: Vlaho, Lovrić, Karačić

Report

Montana 2003	20–0	Vojvodina 021

Mladost Hall, Montana

=== Game 12 ===
26 February 2021
17:00

Report

Budućnost Bemax	70–53	Montana 2003
Scoring by quarter: 19:15, 16:19, 20:8, 15:11
Pts: Đorđević 20; Rebs: Đorđević 13; Asts: Jakšić 5		Pts: Williams 16; Rebs: Williams 7 Asts: Aleksić 4

Bemax Arena, Podgorica
Attendance: 50
Referees: Vlaho, Šutalo, Jurković

9 February 2021
13:30

Report

Vojvodina 021	0–20	RMU Banovići
Scoring by quarter: 17:15, 20:12, 18:15, 25:10
Pts: Adamović 18; Rebs: Adamović 11; Asts: Jakovljević 6		Pts: Marković 14; Rebs: Marković 7 Asts: Ikanović, Prokić 3

Petrovaradin Hall, Novi Sad
Attendance: 10
Referees: Miloradović, Pešić, Vlahović

22 November 2020
16:00

Report

Orlovi	73–69	Cinkarna Celje
Scoring by quarter: 20:18, 26:20, 13:11, 14:20
Pts: Domuzin 24; Rebs: Erak 11; Asts: Ristić, Rajić 3		Pts: Bogićević 21; Rebs: Bogićević 10; Asts: Seničar 3

Hall Gimnazija Center Celje, Celje
Attendance: /
Referees: Kumrić, Nakić, Valpatić

13 January 2021
14:00

Report

Partizan 1953	54–86	Beroe
Scoring by quarter: 9:25, 12:20, 18:25, 15:16
Pts: Olić 13; Rebs: Stojić, Marjanović 5 Asts: Stojić 4		Pts: Dineva 15; Rebs: Boothe 10; Asts: Dineva 5

Municipal Hall, Stara Zagora
Attendance: /
Referees: Matić, Kral, Kovačević

=== Game 13 ===
29 December 2020
16:00

Report

Partizan 1953	64–97	Budućnost Bemax
Scoring by quarter: 13:26, 13:30, 17:18, 21:23
Pts: Luković 16; Rebs: Jovanović 6 Asts: Kovačević 6		Pts: Đorđević 15; Rebs: Bura 11; Asts: three players 5

Sports centre Master, Belgrade
Attendance: 10
Referees: Matić, Mali, Radosavljević

25 February 2021
14:00

Report

Beroe	78–66	Orlovi
Scoring by quarter: 20:8, 17:18, 26:14, 15:26
Pts: Delić 15; Rebs: Koleva 8 Asts: Hristova 7		Pts: Domuzin 32; Rebs: Erak 13; Asts: Rajić 4

Municipal Hall, Stara Zagora
Attendance: /
Referees: Holjevac, Grubišić, Lombar

Report

Cinkarna Celje	20–0	Vojvodina 021

Hall Gimnazija Center Celje, Celje

23 February 2021
18:30

Report

RMU Banovići	76–85	Montana 2003
Scoring by quarter: 13:23, 27:24, 15:16, 21:22
Pts: Marković, Thompson 16; Rebs: Marković 10; Asts: Prokić 8		Pts: Aleksić 20; Rebs: Georgieva 9 Asts: Georgieva 5

SKC Banovići, Banovići
Attendance: /
Referees: Miloradović, Dašić, Nemanja Vlahović

=== Game 14 ===
1 March 2021
17:00

Report

Budućnost Bemax	79–44	RMU Banovići
Scoring by quarter: 28:8, 18:11, 25:19, 8:6
Pts: Bigović 16; Rebs: Bigović 17; Asts: Leković 9		Pts: Ikanović 16; Rebs: Kurtić 5 Asts: Ikanović, Kurtić 3

Bemax Arena, Podgorica
Attendance: 50
Referees: Bajramović, Mjeda, Strikić

18 February 2021
18:00

Report

Montana 2003	58–60	Cinkarna Celje
Scoring by quarter: 10:16, 16:19, 19:13, 13:12
Pts: Ivanova 19; Rebs: Williams 15; Asts: Stoycheva, Aleksić 5		Pts: Čeh 12; Rebs: Ostojić 10; Asts: Čeh 5

Mladost Hall, Montana
Attendance: /
Referees: Pelja, Bajgorić, Džampo

4 March 2021
16:00

Report

Vojvodina 021	0–20	Beroe

Municipal Hall, Stara Zagora

9 February 2021
14:30

Report

Orlovi	76–57	Partizan 1953
Scoring by quarter: 13:12, 20:23, 27:17, 16:5
Pts: Erak 26; Rebs: Erak 10; Asts: Domuzin 6		Pts: Olić 21; Rebs: Luković 7 Asts: Stojić 6

Sports centre Master, Belgrade
Attendance: /
Referees: Hartman, Holjevac, Andrić
