= 2015–16 MŽRKL Final Four =

Final Four to be played from 12 to 13 March 2016, in the Morača Sports Center in Podgorica, Montenegro.

== Semifinals ==
12 March 2016
16:00

Report

Radivoj Korać	61–63	Medveščak
Scoring by quarter: 17:18, 8:13, 13:19, 23:13
Pts: Mandić, Bučevac 20; Rebs: Mandić 11; Asts: Mandić 3		Pts: Borović 22; Rebs: Todorić, Bura 8 Asts: Todorić 5

Morača Sports Center, Podgorica
Attendance: 540
Referees: Dragojević, Šundić, Čavor

12 March 2016
18:30

Report

Budućnost Bemax	70–57	Kvarner
Scoring by quarter: 10:14, 21:11, 20:22, 19:10
Pts: Popović, Kapor 16; Rebs: Roglić 10; Asts: three players 2		Pts: Šesnić 12; Rebs: Šesnić 8 Asts: Šerić 5

Morača Sports Center, Podgorica
Attendance: 1150
Referees: Juras, Adamović, Tomić

== For third place ==
13 March 2016
17:00

Report

Radivoj Korać	63–41	Kvarner
Pts: Vasović 16; Rebs: L. Vučković 9 Asts: Mandić 8		Pts: Miletić 10; Rebs: Blažević 6 Asts: Perić 3

Morača Sports Center, Podgorica
Attendance: 350
Referees: Tomić, Dragojević, Šundić

== Final ==
13 March 2016
19:30

Report

Medveščak	58–74	Budućnost Bemax
Scoring by quarter: 13:21, 18:16, 16:19, 11:18
Pts: Premasunac 12; Rebs: Todorić 12; Asts: Premasunac 5		Pts: Matović 24; Rebs: Roglić 8 Asts: Popović 6

Morača Sports Center, Podgorica
Attendance: 2100
Referees: Juras, Čavara, Kralj

== Bracket ==
club 1	result	club 2
semifinals
(Serbia) Radivoj Korać	61:63	(Croatia) Medveščak
(Montenegro) Budućnost Bemax	70:57	(Croatia) Kvarner
for third place
(Serbia) Radivoj Korać	63:41	(Croatia) Kvarner
final
(Croatia) Medveščak	58:74	(Montenegro) Budućnost Bemax

2015–16 MŽRKL

Budućnost Bemax
1st Title
