= 2017–18 WABA League =

- League: Adriatic League
- Sport: Basketball
- Duration: 4 October 2017 – 25 March 2018
- Games: 100
- Teams: 12
- Total attendance: 20503 (missing data for some matches)
- TV partner: (Slovenia) TV Celje

2017–18
- Season champions: (Montenegro) Budućnost Bemax (2nd title)
- Season MVP: (Slovenia) Zala Friškovec
- Top scorer: (Bosnia and Herzegovina) Nikolina Džebo

WABA League seasons
- ← 2016–17 2018–19 →

The 2017–18 BTravel WABA League was the 17th season of the Adriatic League. Competition included twelve teams from seven countries. In this season participating clubs from Serbia, Croatia, Montenegro, Bosnia and Herzegovina, Bulgaria, Turkey and Slovenia.

== Team information ==
Country	Teams	Team	City	Venue (Capacity)
Croatia	3			
Croatia	3	Medveščak	Zagreb	ŠD Pešćenica (600)
Croatia	3	Trešnjevka 2009	Zagreb	ŠD Pešćenica (600); Dom Sportova (3.100); Sutinska vrela (2.000)
Croatia	3	Ragusa Dubrovnik	Dubrovnik	Športska dvorana Gospino polje (1.400)
Serbia	3			
Serbia	3	Crvena zvezda	Belgrade	Železnik Hall (3.000)
Serbia	3	Partizan 1953	Belgrade	Sports Hall Ranko Žeravica (5.000); Vizura Sport hall (500)
Serbia	3	Kraljevo	Kraljevo	Kraljevo Sports Hall (3.331)
Bulgaria	2			
Bulgaria	2	Montana 2003	Montana	Sports Hall Mladost (n / a)
Bulgaria	2	Beroe	Stara Zagora	Municipal Hall (1.000)
Slovenia	1			
Slovenia	1	Cinkarna Celje	Celje	Dvorana Gimnazije Celje – Center (1.500)
Montenegro	1			
Montenegro	1	Budućnost Bemax	Podgorica	University Sports&Culture Hall (770)
Bosnia and Herzegovina	1			
Bosnia and Herzegovina	1	Play Off Ultra	Sarajevo	Skenderija (5.616); Sports centre R (n / a)
Turkey	1			
Turkey	1	İstanbul Üniversitesi	Istanbul	Prof. Dr. Turgay Atasü Sports Hall (2.000)

== Regular season ==
In the Regular season was played with 12 teams divided into 2 groups of 6 teams and play a dual circuit system, each with one game each at home and away. The four best teams in each group at the end of the regular season were placed in the League 8. The regular season began on 4 October 2017 and it will end on 21 December 2017.

=== Group A ===
Place	Team	Pld	W	L	PF	PA	Diff	Pts	
1.	(Montenegro) Budućnost Bemax	10	8	2	749	527	+222	18	League 8
2.	(Serbia) Crvena zvezda	10	8	2	812	602	+210	18	League 8
3.	(Croatia) Trešnjevka 2009	10	5	5	689	703	-14	15	League 8
4.	(Bulgaria) Beroe	10	5	5	748	707	+41	15	League 8
5.	(Bosnia and Herzegovina) Play Off Ultra	10	4	6	714	744	-30	14	
6.	(Turkey) İstanbul Üniversitesi	10	0	10	478	907	-429	10	

=== Group B ===
Place	Team	Pld	W	L	PF	PA	Diff	Pts	
1.	(Slovenia) Cinkarna Celje	10	9	1	827	598	+229	19	League 8
2.	(Serbia) Partizan 1953	10	7	3	705	668	+37	17	League 8
3.	(Bulgaria) Montana 2003	10	7	3	788	672	+116	17	League 8
4.	(Croatia) Medveščak	10	4	6	655	641	+14	14	League 8
5.	(Serbia) Kraljevo	10	2	8	571	734	-163	12	
6.	(Croatia) Ragusa Dubrovnik	10	1	9	553	786	-233	11	

== League 8 ==
In the League 8 was played with 8 teams and play a dual circuit system, each with one game each at home and away. The four best teams in League 8 at the end of the last round were placed on the Final Four. The regular season began on 10 January 2018 and it will end on 15 March 2018.

Place	Team	Pld	W	L	PF	PA	Diff	Pts	
1.	(Slovenia) Cinkarna Celje	14	11	3	1064	881	+183	28	Final Four
2.	(Montenegro) Budućnost Bemax	14	10	4	986	800	+186	24	Final Four
3.	(Bulgaria) Montana 2003	14	9	5	1055	948	+107	23	Final Four
4.	(Serbia) Crvena zvezda	14	8	6	994	941	+53	22	Final Four
5.	(Serbia) Partizan 1953	14	6	8	911	992	-81	20	
6.	(Bulgaria) Beroe	14	4	10	878	973	-95	18	
7.	(Croatia) Medveščak	14	5	9	805	909	-104	18	
8.	(Croatia) Trešnjevka 2009	14	3	11	804	1053	-198	17	

== Classification 9–12 ==
Classification 9–12 of the Adriatic League took place between 28 February 2018 and it will end on 14 March 2018.

=== Ninth place game ===
Team #1	Agg.	Team #2	1st leg	2nd leg
Play Off Ultra (Bosnia and Herzegovina)	163:150	(Serbia) Kraljevo	70:62	93:88

=== Eleventh place game ===
Team #1	Agg.	Team #2	1st leg	2nd leg
İstanbul Üniversitesi (Turkey)	100:135	(Croatia) Ragusa Dubrovnik	49:67	51:68

== Final Four ==
Final Four to be played from 24–25 March 2018 in the Montana, Bulgaria.

Semi-finals; 24 March
(Slovenia) Cinkarna Celje	77
(Serbia) Crvena zvezda	55
(Montenegro) Budućnost Bemax	74
(Bulgaria) Montana 2003	67

Final; 25 March
(Slovenia) Cinkarna Celje	68
(Montenegro) Budućnost Bemax	71
Third place
(Serbia) Crvena zvezda	69
(Bulgaria) Montana 2003	77

2017–18 Adriatic League champion

Budućnost Bemax
2nd Title

== Final standings ==
Place	Team	Notes
1.	(Montenegro) Budućnost Bemax	Champion
2.	(Slovenia) Cinkarna Celje	
3.	(Bulgaria) Montana 2003	
4.	(Serbia) Crvena zvezda	
5.	(Serbia) Partizan 1953	
6.	(Bulgaria) Beroe	
7.	(Croatia) Medveščak	
8.	(Croatia) Trešnjevka 2009	
9.	(Bosnia and Herzegovina) Play Off Ultra	
10.	(Serbia) Kraljevo	
11.	(Croatia) Ragusa Dubrovnik	
12.	(Turkey) İstanbul Üniversitesi	

== Awards ==
- Player of the Year: Sarah Boothe (195-F/C-90) of (Bulgaria) Montana 2003
- Guard of the Year: Božica Mujović (178-G-96) of (Montenegro) Budućnost Bemax
- Forward of the Year: Iva Slonjšak (183-SG-97) of (Slovenia) Cinkarna Celje
- Center of the Year: Sarah Boothe (195-F/C-90) of (Bulgaria) Montana 2003
- Defensive Player of the Year: Larisa Ocvirk (187-SF-97) of (Slovenia) Cinkarna Celje
- Most Improved Player of the Year: Zala Friškovec (178-G-99) of (Slovenia) Cinkarna Celje
- Newcomer of the Year: Lucija Kostić (187-F-00) of (Croatia) Trešnjevka 2009
- Coach of the Year: Goran Bošković of (Montenegro) Budućnost Bemax

1st Team

- PG: Božica Mujović (178-G-96) of (Montenegro) Budućnost Bemax
- SG: Zala Friškovec (178-G-99) of (Slovenia) Cinkarna Celje
- SF: Iva Slonjšak (183-SG-97) of (Slovenia) Cinkarna Celje
- PF: Kristina Topuzović (183-F/G-94) of (Montenegro) Budućnost Bemax
- C: Sarah Boothe (195-F/C-90) of (Bulgaria) Montana 2003

2nd Team

- PG: Miljana Bojović (181-G-87) of (Poland) CCC Polkowice
- SG: Karla Erjavec (172-G-99) of (Croatia) Trešnjevka 2009
- SF: Larisa Ocvirk (187-SF-97) of (Slovenia) Cinkarna Celje
- PF: Tearra Banks (188-C-95) of (Bulgaria) Beroe
- C: Ivanka Matić (193-C/F-79) of (Serbia) Partizan 1953

All-Defensive Team

- PG: Božica Mujović (178-G-96) of (Montenegro) Budućnost Bemax
- SG: Iva Todorić (174-F-93) of (Croatia) Medveščak
- SF: Larisa Ocvirk (187-SF-97) of (Slovenia) Cinkarna Celje
- PF/C: Oderah Chidom (193-F-95) of (Slovenia) Cinkarna Celje
- C: Patricia Bura (188-C-96) of (Croatia) Medveščak

Honorable Mention

- Nikolina Babić (177-G-95) of (Montenegro) Budućnost Bemax
- Nikolina Džebo (186-C-95) of (Montenegro) Budućnost Bemax
- Mina Đorđević (186-PF-99) of (Serbia) Crvena zvezda
- Biljana Stjepanović (190-C-87) of (Serbia) Crvena zvezda
- Jovana Marković (186-PF-97) of (Bosnia and Herzegovina) Play Off Ultra

All-Newcomers Team

- PG: Nika Mühl (177-PG-01) of (Croatia) Trešnjevka 2009
- SG: Teodora Dineva (178-G/F-96) of (Bulgaria) Beroe
- SF: Dragana Nikolić (189-PF-95) of (Serbia) Kraljevo
- PF: Lucija Kostić (187-F-00) of (Croatia) Trešnjevka 2009
- PF/C: Ana Vojtulek (187-C-99) of (Croatia) Medveščak

== See also ==
- 2017–18 ABA League First Division
- 2017–18 ABA League Second Division

2017–18 domestic competitions

- 2017–18 First Women's Basketball League of Serbia
