= 2020–21 WABA League Final Four =

Final Four of the Adriatic League was held on 20 to 21 March 2021 in Stara Zagora.

== Semifinals ==
20 March 2021
18:30

Report

Beroe	82–68	Montana 2003
Scoring by quarter: 21:17, 20:12, 21:18, 20:21
Pts: Boothe 19; Rebs: Zlatanova 8 Asts: three players 4		Pts: Ramona, H. Ivanova 14; Rebs: Aleksić 6 Asts: three players 3

Municipal Hall, Stara Zagora
Attendance: /
Referees: Pešić, Miloradović, Matić

20 March 2021
15:30

Report

Budućnost Bemax	70–60	Cinkarna Celje
Scoring by quarter: 17:18, 19:12, 20:13, 14:17
Pts: Bura 16; Rebs: Bura 13; Asts: Mitrašinović 6		Pts: Bogićević 17; Rebs: Bogićević 9 Asts: Debeljak 4

Municipal Hall, Stara Zagora
Attendance: /
Referees: Bajgorić, Hasić, Bambur

== For third place ==
21 March 2021
15:30

Report

Montana 2003	68–65	Cinkarna Celje
Scoring by quarter: 21:16, 18:21, 18:12, 11:16
Pts: Ramona 21; Rebs: Williams 12; Asts: Ramona 6		Pts: Čeh 15; Rebs: Seničar 10; Asts: Čeh 4

Municipal Hall, Stara Zagora
Attendance: /
Referees: Bajgorić, Hasić, Bambur

== Final ==
21 March 2021
18:30

Report

Beroe	66–56	Budućnost Bemax
Scoring by quarter: 21:13, 10:16, 22:21, 13:6
Pts: Kocheva 15; Rebs: Boothe 12; Asts: three players 4		Pts: Bura 15; Rebs: Bura 13; Asts: Babić 7

Municipal Hall, Stara Zagora
Attendance: /
Referees: Pešić, Miloradović, Matić

== Bracket ==
Semi-finals; 21 March
(Bulgaria) Beroe	82
(Bulgaria) Montana 2003	68
(Montenegro) Budućnost Bemax	70
(Slovenia) Cinkarna Celje	60

Final; 22 March
(Bulgaria) Beroe	66
(Montenegro) Budućnost Bemax	56
Third place
(Bulgaria) Montana 2003	68
(Slovenia) Cinkarna Celje	65

2020–21 Adriatic League champion

Beroe
2nd title

== Notes ==
- All times given below are in Eastern European Time.
