= 2025–26 WABA League =

European women's basketball tournament

WABA League
- Season: 2025–26
- Dates: Regular season: 15 October 2025 – 4 March 2026; Final four: 28–29 March 2026
- Teams: Total: 7 (from 6 countries)

Finals
- Champions: (Bulgaria) Montana 2003
- Runners-up: (Slovenia) Cinkarna Celje
- Third place: (Montenegro) Budućnost Bemax
- Fourth place: (Serbia) Partizan 1953
- Finals MVP: (Bulgaria) Radostina Hristova ( (Bulgaria) Montana 2003)

Statistical leaders
- Points: (Senegal) Ndioma Kané ( (Slovenia) Cinkarna Celje)
- Rebounds: (United States) Denia Davis–Stewart ( (Bulgaria) Montana 2003)
- Assists: (Montenegro) Zorana Radonjić ( (Montenegro) Budućnost Bemax)

The 2025–26 WABA League is the 25th season of this competition for the top women's teams in the Adriatic region.

Budućnost Bemax were the defending champions, but they lost in the semifinals. They beat Partizan 1953 54–46 in the third place match.

Montana 2003 won the title, defeating Cinkarna Celje 69–66 in the final.

== Format ==
The seven teams all played in a double round robin system where the top four advance to the final four to decide the champions.

== Teams ==
Location of teams in the 2024–25 WABA League
Location of teams in the 2024–25 WABA League

The teams were announced on 27 June 2025.

The labels in the parentheses show how each team qualified for the place of its starting round:

- 1st, 2nd, 3rd, etc.: League position of the previous season

Regular season
(Bosnia and Herzegovina) Orlovi (1st)	(Bulgaria) Beroe (2nd)	(Bulgaria) Rilski Sportist (3rd)	(Croatia) Studio Zagreb (3rd)
(Montenegro) Budućnost Bemax (1st)	(Serbia) Partizan 1953 (5th)	(Slovenia) Cinkarna Celje (1st)	

=== Draw ===
On 27 June 2025, a draw took place to decide the schedule for the tournament.

== Regular season ==
Pos	Team	Pld	W	L	PF	PA	PD	Pts	Qualification	BUD	MON	PAR	CEL	BER	ZAG	ORL
1	(Montenegro) Budućnost Bemax	12	10	2	823	612	+211	22	Semifinals	—	80–58	66–53	72–65	86–54	98–41	~~96–45~~
2	(Bulgaria) Montana 2003	12	9	3	796	695	+101	21	Semifinals	88–82	—	67–57	82–69	79–53	87–63	~~89–53~~
3	(Serbia) Partizan 1953	12	8	4	712	622	+90	20 (Note: Partizan 147–139 Celje)	Play-in	67–59	59–46	—	77–62	93–63	75–61	~~104–40~~
4	(Slovenia) Cinkarna Celje	12	8	4	767	676	+91	20	Play-in	65–83	69–61	77–70	—	90–65	68–46	~~20–0~~
5	(Bulgaria) Rilski Sportist	12	4	8	691	814	−123	16	Play-in	58–84	78–96	61–53	63–89	—	59–66	~~20–0~~
6	(Croatia) Studio Zagreb	12	3	9	660	790	−130	15	Play-in	63–73	85–92	60–68	57–73	78–97	—	~~94–61~~
7	(Bosnia and Herzegovina) Orlovi (Note: On 28 January 2026, Orlovi withdrew due to frequent illnesses of the players and a shortened roster. All games involving Orlovi will be given as a forfeit loss to the other team.)	12	0	12	0	240	−240	12	Withdrew	~~0–20~~	~~50–72~~	~~43–71~~	~~59–87~~	~~42–67~~	~~61–94~~	—

Source: WABA
Rules for classification: 1) Points; 2) Points difference; 3) Points scored.

== Play-in ==
=== Summary ===
The first leg will be played on 25 and 26 February, and the second leg will be played on 3 and 4 March.

Team 1	Agg.	Team 2	1st leg	2nd leg
Partizan 1953 (Serbia)	153–127	(Croatia) Studio Zagreb	74–58	79–69
Cinkarna Celje (Slovenia)	162–143	(Bulgaria) Rilski Sportist	77–64	85–70

== Semifinals ==
=== Summary ===
The semifinals will be played on March 28.

Team 1	Score	Team 2
Budućnost Bemax (Montenegro)	64–68	(Slovenia) Cinkarna Celje
Montana 2003 (Bulgaria)	70–60	(Serbia) Partizan 1953

== Third Place ==
=== Summary ===
The third place match will be played on March 29, between the two semifinal losers.

Team 1	Score	Team 2
Budućnost Bemax (Montenegro)	54–46	(Serbia) Partizan 1953

== Finals ==
=== Summary ===
The finals will be played on March 29, between the two semifinal winners.

Team 1	Score	Team 2
Cinkarna Celje (Slovenia)	66–69	(Bulgaria) Montana 2003

2025–26 WABA League Champions

Montana 2003
First title

== See also ==
- 2025–26 WABA League 2
