= Reyer Venezia (women) =

- Leagues: Serie A1; EuroLeague Women
- Founded: 1872
- Arena: Palasport Taliercio
- Capacity: 3,509
- Location: Venice, Italy
- Team colors: Garnet Red, Gold and White
- President: Federico Casarin
- Head coach: (Italy) Andrea Mazzon
- Website: https://www.reyer.it/femminile/
Home	Away

Reyer Venezia is a professional women's basketball club based in Venice, Italy. The team plays in the LBF, the highest level in Italian basketball. The team was successful in the 1930s and 1950s and won three Italian title in 1946, 2021 and 2024.

== Honours ==
- Serie A1
  - Champions (3): 1945–46, 2020–21, 2023–24
- Serie A2
  - Champions (1): 2012–13
- Italian Cup
  - Champions (1): 2008

== Players ==
=== Current roster ===
Note: Flags indicate national team eligibility at FIBA-sanctioned events. Players may hold other non-FIBA nationalities not displayed.

Reyer Venezia roster
Players
Coaches

Pos.	No.	Nat.	Name	Ht.	Age
SG	0	(Italy)	Logoh, Caterina	1.80 m (5 ft 11 in)	23 – 20 February 2003
PG	1	(France)	Berkani, Lisa	1.75 m (5 ft 9 in)	29 – 19 May 1997
SG	3	(United States)	Smalls, Kamiah	1.78 m (5 ft 10 in)	28 – 17 April 1998
PG	6	(Italy)	Villa, Matilde	1.72 m (5 ft 8 in)	21 – 9 December 2004
PF	7	(Italy)	Nicolodi, Giuditta	1.85 m (6 ft 1 in)	31 – 10 January 1995
SG	9	(Italy)	Pan, Francesca	1.85 m (6 ft 1 in)	29 – 27 May 1997
C	10	(Serbia)	Stanković, Dragana	1.96 m (6 ft 5 in)	31 – 18 January 1995
PF/C	13	(Italy)	Cubaj, Lorela	1.93 m (6 ft 4 in)	27 – 8 January 1999
SF	15	(Italy)	Miccoli, Maria	1.83 m (6 ft 0 in)	30 – 29 June 1995
SF	19	(Italy)	Fassina, Martina	1.83 m (6 ft 0 in)	27 – 7 April 1999
PG	22	(Italy)	Santucci, Mariella	1.70 m (5 ft 7 in)	29 – 18 June 1997
PF	34	(Finland)	Kuier, Awak	1.95 m (6 ft 5 in)	24 – 19 August 2001

Head coach

- (Italy) Andrea Mazzon

Legend

- (C) Team captain
- Injured

- Roster
Updated: 6 November 2024

== History in European competitions ==
Source: basketball.eurobasket.com

- Participations in EuroLeague: 6x
- Participations in EuroCup: 11x
- Participations in Adriatic League: 1x

Season	Competition	Round	Club	Home	Away	Aggregate
2007–08	EuroCup					
2007–08	EuroCup	Regular season (Group K)	(Spain) Baloncesto San José	67–63	76–70	1st
2007–08	EuroCup	Regular season (Group K)	(France) BLMA	84–75	69–68	1st
2007–08	EuroCup	Regular season (Group K)	(Luxembourg) EXMA BBTL Letzebuerg	108–39	80–63	1st
2007–08	EuroCup	Last 32	(Cyprus) K.V. Imperial AEL	65–56	74–70	139–126
2007–08	EuroCup	Last 16	(Russia) Chevakata	62–69	72–67	134–136
2008–09	EuroLeague	Regular season (Group B)	(Czech Republic) Gambrinus Brno	82–73	77–68	1st
2008–09	EuroLeague	Regular season (Group B)	(Hungary) MKB Euroleasing Sopron	70–59	71–65	1st
2008–09	EuroLeague	Regular season (Group B)	(Latvia) TTT Rīga	74–65	57–61	1st
2008–09	EuroLeague	Regular season (Group B)	(France) ESBVA-LM	70–76	81–63	1st
2008–09	EuroLeague	Regular season (Group B)	(Russia) CSKA Moscow	66–63	72–80	1st
2008–09	EuroLeague	Last 16	(Hungary) MiZo Pécs 2010	60–61	57–65	0–2
2010–11	EuroCup					
2010–11	EuroCup	Regular season (Group K)	(Belgium) Dexia Namur Capitale	67–62	63–59	2nd
2010–11	EuroCup	Regular season (Group K)	(France) Arras Pays D'Artois	64–61	69–77	2nd
2010–11	EuroCup	Last 32	(Slovakia) MBK Ružomberok	81–64	91–78	172–142
2010–11	EuroCup	Last 16	(Russia) Chevakata	62–67	64–73	126–140
2014–15	Adriatic League					
2014–15	Adriatic League	Regular season (Group A)	(Montenegro) Budućnost Volcano	51–58	69–64	2nd
2014–15	Adriatic League	Regular season (Group A)	(Serbia) ŽKK Partizan	76–50	73–53	2nd
2014–15	Adriatic League	Regular season (Group A)	(Bosnia and Herzegovina) Play Off Happy	78–50	89–43	2nd
2014–15	Adriatic League	Regular season (Group A)	(Slovenia) Triglav Kranj	82–49	61–55	
2014–15	Adriatic League	Regular season (Group A)	(Croatia) Medveščak	71–47	46–60	
2014–15	Adriatic League	Quarterfinal	(Bosnia and Herzegovina) Čelik Zenica	74–49	67–63	2–0
2014–15	Adriatic League	Semifinal (F4)	(Slovenia) Athlete Celje	83-79 (OT)		
2014–15	Adriatic League	Final (F4)	(Serbia) Radivoj Korać	69-52		
2015–16	EuroCup					
2015–16	EuroCup	Regular season (Group E)	(France) Nantes Rezé	69–59	65–73	1st
2015–16	EuroCup	Regular season (Group E)	(Hungary) PINKK-Pécsi 424	62–49	74–61	1st
2015–16	EuroCup	Regular season (Group E)	(Germany) TSV 1880 Wasserburg	80–60	68–73	1st
2015–16	EuroCup	Last 20	(Latvia) TTT Riga	69–61	67–61	136–122
2015–16	EuroCup	Last 12	(Turkey) Beşiktaş	62–64	67–75	129–139
2016–17	EuroCup					
2016–17	EuroCup	Regular season (Group G)	(Switzerland) Elfic Fribourg Basket	63–56	64–61	1st
2016–17	EuroCup	Regular season (Group G)	(France) Basket Landes	89–78	80–83	1st
2016–17	EuroCup	Regular season (Group G)	(France) Cavigal Nice Basket	65–42	52–57	1st
2016–17	EuroCup	Last 20	(Israel) Maccabi Bnot Ashdod	58–52	72–51	130–103
2016–17	EuroCup	Last 12	(Turkey) Yakın Doğu Üniversitesi	65–56	45–66	110–122
2017–18	EuroCup					
2017–18	EuroCup	Regular season (Group I)	(Switzerland) Elfic Fribourg Basket	77–37	66–55	1st
2017–18	EuroCup	Regular season (Group I)	(Germany) TSV 1880 Wasserburg	67–51	68–58	1st
2017–18	EuroCup	Regular season (Group I)	(Czech Republic) Valosun KP Brno	83–52	76–51	1st
2017–18	EuroCup	Last 20	(France) Saint-Armand Hainaut Basket	88–55	87–58	175–113
2017–18	EuroCup	Last 12	(Slovakia) Good Angels Košice	63–73	89–68	152–141
2017–18	EuroCup	Quarterfinal	(Turkey) Mersin	60–65	79–73	139–138
2017–18	EuroCup	Semifinal	(Turkey) Hatay	80–57	54–74	134–131
2017–18	EuroCup	Final	(Turkey) Galatasaray	72–65	68–90	140–155
2018–19	EuroLeague	Qual. Round	(Latvia) TTT Riga	56-73	56-67	112–140
2018–19	EuroCup	Regular season (Group G)	(France) Nantes Rezé	88–60	57–63	2nd
2018–19	EuroCup	Regular season (Group G)	(Czech Republic) Valosun KP Brno	76–53	64–66	2nd
2018–19	EuroCup	Regular season (Group G)	(Hungary) Aluinvent DVTK Miskolc	92–75	61–63	2nd
2018–19	EuroCup	Last 24	(France) Basket Landes	78–58	77–68	155–126
2018–19	EuroCup	Last 20	(France) BLMA	83–64	60–83	143–147
2019–20	EuroLeague	Qual. Round	(Hungary) Aluinvent DVTK Miskolc	81-68	75-85	156–153
2019–20	EuroLeague	Regular season (Group A)	(France) Tango Bourges Basket	73–63	45–68	5th
2019–20	EuroLeague	Regular season (Group A)	(Turkey) Gelecek Koleji Çukurova	70–61	81–86	5th
2019–20	EuroLeague	Regular season (Group A)	(Russia) UMMC Ekaterinburg	61–86	44–97	5th
2019–20	EuroLeague	Regular season (Group A)	(Russia) Nadezhda Orenburg	61–63	51–78	5th
2019–20	EuroLeague	Regular season (Group A)	(Belgium) Castors Braine	58–75	61–58	5th
2019–20	EuroLeague	Regular season (Group A)	(Czech Republic) ZVVZ USK Praha	50–77	57–89	5th
2019–20	EuroLeague	Regular season (Group A)	(Latvia) TTT Riga	20–0^{[a]}	68–60	5th
2019–20	EuroCup	Quarterfinal	(Spain) Spar Citylift Girona	Competition was canceled due the COVID-19		
2020–21	EuroCup	Regular season (Group E)	(Belgium) Phantoms Basket Boom	118–53	—	1st
2020–21	EuroCup	Regular season (Group E)	(Switzerland) BCF Elfic Fribourg	116–63	—	1st
2020–21	EuroCup	Regular season (Group E)	(France) Landerneau Bretagne Basket	86–62	—	1st
2020–21	EuroCup	Last 16	(Poland) InvestInTheWest ENEA Gorzow	72-63		
2020–21	EuroCup	Quarterfinal	(Romania) ACS Sepsi SIC	78-64		
2020–21	EuroCup	Semifinal (F4)	(Hungary) Atomerőmű KSC Szekszárd	63-58		
2020–21	EuroCup	Final (F4)	(Spain) Valencia BC	81-82		
2021–22	EuroLeague	Regular season (Group A)	(Hungary) Atomerőmű KSC Szekszárd	80–59	65–51	6th
2021–22	EuroLeague	Regular season (Group A)	(Russia) UMMC Ekaterinburg	67–74	69–75	6th
2021–22	EuroLeague	Regular season (Group A)	(Spain) Perfumerías Avenida	56–71	69–110	6th
2021–22	EuroLeague	Regular season (Group A)	(Latvia) TTT Riga	54–62	57–71	6th
2021–22	EuroLeague	Regular season (Group A)	(Russia) MBA Moscow	61–62	75–72	6th
2021–22	EuroLeague	Regular season (Group A)	(France) BLMA	79–59	74–52	6th
2021–22	EuroLeague	Regular season (Group A)	(Czech Republic) ZVVZ USK Praha	75–84	53–88	6th
2021–22	EuroCup	Quarterfinal	(Spain) Valencia BC	57–61	75–67	132–128
2021–22	EuroCup	Semifinal (F4)	(Turkey) CBK Mersin Yenisehir Bld	85-80		
2021–22	EuroCup	Final (F4)	(France) Tango Bourges	38-74		
2022–23	EuroCup	Regular season (Group H)	(Spain) Movistar Estudiantes	85–69	86–69	1st
2022–23	EuroCup	Regular season (Group H)	(Spain) Lointek Gernika	68–65	76–59	1st
2022–23	EuroCup	Regular season (Group H)	(Germany) Rutronik Stars Keltern	87–53	94–65	1st
2022–23	EuroCup	Last 32	(Italy) Dinamo Banco di Sardegna	83–61	82–89	165–150
2022–23	EuroCup	Last 16	(Israel) Elitzur Holon	77–60	68–83	145–143
2022–23	EuroCup	Quarterfinal	(Israel) Elitzur Landco Ramla	59–48	75–80	134–128
2022–23	EuroCup	Semifinal	(Turkey) Galatasaray Cagdas Factoring	69–60	49–74	118–134
2023–24	EuroCup	Regular season (Group J)	(Croatia) ŽKK Ragusa Dubrovnik	91–38	113–34	1st
2023–24	EuroCup	Regular season (Group J)	(Hungary) NKA Universitas Pecs	73–58	67–52	1st
2023–24	EuroCup	Regular season (Group J)	(Turkey) Bursa Uludag Basketbol	105–58	80–64	1st
2023–24	EuroCup	Last 32	(Switzerland) BCF Elfic Fribourg	72–51	83–63	155–114
2023–24	EuroCup	Last 16	(Poland) VBW Arka Gdynia	80–59	77–68	157–127
2023–24	EuroCup	Quarterfinal	(Latvia) TTT Riga	88–78	83–70	171–148
2023–24	EuroCup	Semifinal	(United Kingdom) London Lions	68–69	59–71	127–140
2024–25	EuroLeague	First round (Group D)	(Hungary) Uni Győr	82–68	59–80	3rd
2024–25	EuroLeague	First round (Group D)	(Spain) Valencia Basket	75–67	83–72	3rd
2024–25	EuroLeague	First round (Group D)	(Czech Republic) ZVVZ USK Praha	66–86	100–85	3rd
2024–25	EuroLeague	Second round (Group F)	(Spain) Casademont Zaragoza	39–44	64–56	5th
2024–25	EuroLeague	Second round (Group F)	(Turkey) Fenerbahçe	71–79	86–66	5th
2024–25	EuroLeague	Second round (Group F)	(Poland) KGHM BC Polkowice	—^{[b]}	—^{[b]}	5th
2025–26	EuroLeague					
2025–26	EuroLeague	Qual. Round	(Serbia) KKZ Crvena zvezda	70–63	71–79	149–134
2025–26	EuroLeague	First round (Group D)	(Turkey) ÇIMSA CBK Mersin	72–62	83–69	2nd
2025–26	EuroLeague	First round (Group D)	(France) Basket Landes	57–56	63–57	2nd
2025–26	EuroLeague	First round (Group D)	(Spain) Casademont Zaragoza	68–61	80–84	2nd
2025–26	EuroLeague	Second round (Group F)	(Turkey) Fenerbahçe	61–71	96–48	3rd
2025–26	EuroLeague	Second round (Group F)	(Hungary) DVTK HUN-Therm	83–81	69–71	3rd
2025–26	EuroLeague	Second round (Group F)	(Spain) Valencia Basket	69–55	81–73	3rd
2025–26	EuroLeague	Play-in	(Italy) Beretta Famila Schio	66–68^{[c]} / 62–51^{[e]}	72–79^{[d]}	2–1
2025–26	EuroLeague	Quarterfinal	(Spain) Spar Girona	60–74		

^{a} Due to the COVID-19 pandemic in Northern Italy, TTT Riga did not travel to Venezia and lost the game via forfeit by 20–0.
^{b} On 4 January 2025, KGHM BC Polkowice withdrew from the competition due to financial reasons. All games involving KGHM BC Polkowice will be annulled and not count for the rankings.
^{c} Game 1
^{d} Game 2
^{e} Game 3
