= Mirna Deak =

Croatian basketball player

Personal information
- Born: March 2, 1974 (age 52) Brežice, SFR Yugoslavia
- Listed height: 1.95 m (6 ft 5 in)

Career information
- Playing career: 1992–2008
- Position: Center

Career history
- 1992–1999: Zrinjevac
- 1999–2002: Merkur Celje
- 2002–2008: Željezničar Sarajevo
- 2008: Athlete Celje

Mirna Deak (born 2 March 1974 in Brežice, SFR Yugoslavia) is a former Croatian female basketball player.
