= Cecilia Okoye =

American-born Nigerian basketball player

No. 7 – B.B.C. Etzella
- Position: Forward
- League: N1D

Personal information
- Born: 13 September 1991 (age 35) New York, U.S.
- Listed height: 6 ft 1 in (1.85 m)
- Listed weight: 167 lb (76 kg)

Career information
- College: McNeese State (2014)
- WNBA draft: 2014: undrafted
Medals
Women's basketball
Representing Nigeria
AfroBasket
Gold medal – first place	2017 Mali

Cecilia Nkemdilim Okoye (born 13 September 1991) is an American-born Nigerian basketball player for B.B.C. Etzella and the Nigerian national team.

== Early life ==
She was born in Texas to Nigerian parents.

== International career ==
She participated at the 2017 Women's Afrobasket. she averaged 4pts, 2.4rebounds and 0.5 assists per game during the tournament for the D'Tigress. The team won Gold at the tournament.

== Nigeria club career ==
She played for the Nigerian side First Bank women's basketball club of lagos also known as the Elephant Girls during the 2017 FIBA Africa champions cup for women tournament at Angola. The tournament took place from 10–19 November, while the Spanish league was not yet started. She averaged 10.3pts, 5.3 rebounds and 1 assists per game during the tournament.
