= CCS Šumice =

Sports arena in Belgrade, Serbia

- ЦКС Шумице
- Location within Belgrade
- Full name: Šumice Center for Culture and Sports
- Former names: Voždovac Home of Pioneers and Youth
- Address: 125 Ustanička Street
- Location: Šumice, Belgrade, Serbia
- Coordinates: 44.7845°N 20.4905°E
- Capacity: 2,000

Construction
- Opened: 24 May 1974; 52 years ago

Tenants
- KMF Konjarnik; OKK Beograd; BKK Radnički; ŽKK Radivoj Korać

Šumice Center for Culture and Sports (Šumice CCS; Serbian: Центар за културу и спорт Шумице (ЦКС Шумице), romanized: Centar za kulturu i sport Šumice (CKS Šumice)) is an indoor sports arena located in Voždovac, Belgrade, Serbia.

The hall is used for basketball, handball, indoor football, volleyball, and other sports.

The venue was opened on 24 May 1974 and was originally known as the Voždovac Home of Pioneers and Youth (Serbian: Дом пионира и омладине Вождовац (ДПО Вождовац), romanized: Dom pionira i omladine Voždovac (DPO Voždovac)). It has a total floor area of 5,814 m^{2} (62,580 sq ft) and includes a sports hall with 2,000 seats and a hall with the stage with 350 seats. Due to the lack of funds and bad maintenance, the venue has been in bad financial situation since the late 1980s and especially since the 2000s.

The venue was partially reconstructed (congress hall, press hall, roof) in September–November 2017.

== See also ==
- List of indoor arenas in Serbia
