= WABA League =

Top-level regional basketball league

- Current season, competition or edition: 2026–27 WABA League
- Official logo of the WABA League
- Sport: Basketball
- Founded: 2001
- First season: 2001–02
- No. of teams: 12
- Country: Austria; Bosnia and Herzegovina; Bulgaria; Croatia; Montenegro; Serbia; Slovenia
- Continent: FIBA Europe
- Most recent champions: (Slovenia) Cinkarna Celje (5th title)
- Most titles: (Croatia) Šibenik (5 titles)
- Website: waba-league.com

WABA League, commonly known as the Adriatic League, is a top-level regional basketball league, featuring female teams from Serbia, Montenegro, Austria, Bosnia and Herzegovina, Bulgaria, Slovenia and Croatia. Clubs from Turkey, North Macedonia, Hungary and Italy had their representatives in WABA League in past seasons. Since 2012 a Cadet WABA League and since 2014 Pionir WABA League is also played.

== History ==
=== Formation and early years ===
WABA League was established in 2001 as EWWL League. In its first season, it included six teams from four countries (Austria, Slovenia, Croatia and Bosnia and Herzegovina). After the regular season, it held a tournament in which the three best teams played, which was won by Athlete Celje. In the next season, the league expanded to eight teams, and the final tournament was altered so that the placement included the four top teams. At the final tournament, the winner was Željezničar Sarajevo.

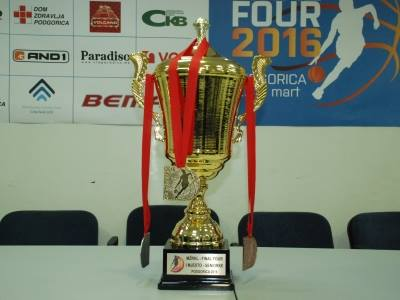
Official trophy of WABA League (March 2016)

In 2003, the league changed its name to EWWL Trocal League, which lasted until 2006. During these seasons, the number of teams playing in the league varied from nine to twelve. From 2004 to 2006, it had a representative from Macedonia and then one from Bulgaria in the 2006–07 season. Austrian clubs left the competition in 2004. Since 2003, the competing teams have been from Serbia and Montenegro. In 2006, the league changed its name to WABA NBL which was used until 2008. In 2006, the WABA Cup launched, which existed until 2010 and was attended by participants in the league. In 2007, the WABA Cup bore the name Vojko Herskel. In the 2008–09 season, the league was named after WABA Multipover; in 2009–10 season, it was named IWBL.

=== 2010s ===
In 2010, the league changed its name to MŽRKL. The Vojko Herksel Cup was last played. In the 2012–13 season, the league included the Hungarian PEAC-Pécs, and the Belgrade Partizan achieved a record in its history, playing 32 matches in the national competitions (regional league, championship and cup) all season without suffering a defeat. In the 2013–14 season, the format of the competition changed. The twelve participating teams were divided into two groups of six teams. Four first-placed teams were placed in the quarterfinals, with the winners to the Final Four.

In the 2015-16 season, the league introduced instead of quarterfinals League 6, in which the first phase the two groups are placed by 3 teams. The League 6 transmitted the results achieved against teams from the same group in the first phase they finished the League 6. League 6 plays a dual circuit system (one game at home and one away) against teams that have qualified from the opposite group previous stage of the competition. The four best teams in League 6 advance to the Final Four.

In September 2016, the league officially changed its name to WABA League. In June 2017, the league signed a sponsorship contract with tourist agency BTravel and officially changed its name to BTravel WABA League.

=== Names in history ===
- EWWL League (2001–2003)
- EWWL Trocal League (2003–2006)
- WABA NBL (2006–2008)
- WABA Multipower (2008–2009)
- IWBL (2009–2010)
- MŽRKL (2010–2016)
- WABA League (2016–present)

== Youth competition ==
=== Cadet WABA League ===
In the season 2012–13, the Cadet League was launched, and since it has shown a lot of success in that period, it has continued to be held. The winner of the first two seasons of cadet WABA League is the team Trešnjevka 2009 from Croatia, when he beat the team of Novi Zagreb and Crvena zvezda. In the third seasonis the champion was the team of Triglav Kranj, Slovenia, which is defeated in the final match of Maribor.

=== Pionir WABA League ===
Following the success of cadet league, a decision was made to launch the pioneering leagues. In the first season, the winner of the pioneering league is team Croatia 2006 from Zagreb, Croatia, that won at the team of Jedinstvo Tuzla from Tuzla, Bosnia and Herzegovina.

== Finals ==
Year	Host	Final			Third and fourth place	
Year	Host	Winner	Score	Runner-up	Third place	Fourth place
2001–02; Details	Šibenik (CRO)	(Slovenia); Merkur Celje	2:1	(Croatia); Šibenik Jolly JBS	(Bosnia and Herzegovina); Željezničar Sarajevo	N / A
2002–03; Details	Sarajevo (BIH)	(Bosnia and Herzegovina); Željezničar Sarajevo	84:78	(Croatia); Šibenik Jolly JBS	(Slovenia); Merkur Celje	(Croatia); Gospić Industrogradnja
2003–04; Details	Gospić (CRO)	(Croatia); Gospić Industrogradnja	59:58	(Croatia); Šibenik Jolly JBS	Croatia 2006	(Serbia and Montenegro); Univerziteti Priština
2004–05; Details	Šibenik (CRO)	(Croatia); Šibenik Jolly JBS	82:66	(Croatia); Gospić Industrogradnja	(Serbia and Montenegro); Vojvodina NIS	(Bosnia and Herzegovina); Željezničar Sarajevo
2005–06; Details	Novi Sad (SCG)	(Croatia); Šibenik Jolly JBS	68:55	(Serbia and Montenegro); Vojvodina NIS	(Slovenia); Merkur Celje	Gospić Croatia Osiguranje
2006–07; Details	Sofia (BUL)	(Bulgaria); CSKA Sofia	73:67	(Croatia); Šibenik Jolly JBS	Gospić Croatia Osiguranje	(Bosnia and Herzegovina); Željezničar Sarajevo
2007–08; Details	Gospić (CRO)	(Croatia); Šibenik Jolly JBS	72:66	Gospić Croatia Osiguranje	(Croatia); Ragusa Dubrovnik	(Montenegro); Budućnost Podgorica
2008–09; Details	Bijelo Polje (MNE)	(Croatia); Šibenik Jolly JBS	69:63	(Montenegro); Jedinstvo Bijelo Polje	Gospić Croatia Osiguranje	(Slovenia); Merkur Celje
2009–10; Details	Gospić (CRO)	(Croatia); Gospić	73:65	(Croatia); Šibenik Jolly JBS	(Slovenia); Merkur Celje	(Bosnia and Herzegovina); Mladi Krajišnik
2010–11; Details	Šibenik (CRO)	(Croatia); Šibenik Jolly JBS	20:0	(Croatia); Gospić	(Slovenia); Merkur Celje	(Serbia); Partizan
2011–12; Details	Zenica (BIH)	(Serbia); Partizan Galenika	74:65	(Bosnia and Herzegovina); Čelik Zenica	(Serbia); Voždovac	(Serbia); Hemofarm Štada
2012–13; Details	Novi Sad (SRB)	(Serbia); Partizan Galenika	70:45	(Serbia); Radivoj Korać	(Hungary); Peac-Pécs	(Serbia); Vojvodina NIS
2013–14; Details	Podgorica (MNE)	(Serbia); Radivoj Korać	87:83	(Serbia); Crvena zvezda	(Slovenia); Athlete Celje	(Montenegro); Budućnost Volcano
2014–15; Details	Celje (SLO)	(Italy); Umana Reyer Venezia	69:52	(Serbia); Radivoj Korać	(Montenegro); Budućnost Volcano	(Slovenia); Athlete Celje
2015–16; Details	Podgorica (MNE)	(Montenegro); Budućnost Bemax	74:58	(Croatia); Medveščak	(Serbia); Radivoj Korać	(Croatia); Kvarner
2016–17; Details	Podgorica (MNE)	(Slovenia); Athlete Celje	61:57	(Bulgaria); Beroe	(Montenegro); Budućnost Bemax	(Bulgaria); Montana 2003
2017–18; Details	Montana (BUL)	(Montenegro); Budućnost Bemax	71:68	(Slovenia); Cinkarna Celje	(Bulgaria); Montana 2003	(Serbia); Crvena zvezda
2018–19; Details	Celje (SLO)	(Bulgaria); Beroe	65:64	(Montenegro); Budućnost Bemax	(Slovenia); Cinkarna Celje	(Serbia); Crvena zvezda
2019–20; Details	Stara Zagora (BUL)	(Montenegro); Budućnost Bemax	Final four not played	(Slovenia); Cinkarna Celje	(Bulgaria); Montana 2003	(Bulgaria); Beroe
2020–21; Details	Stara Zagora (BUL)	(Bulgaria); Beroe	66:56	(Montenegro); Budućnost Bemax	(Bulgaria); Montana 2003	(Slovenia); Cinkarna Celje
2021–22; Details	Podgorica (MNE)	(Slovenia); Cinkarna Celje	58:51	(Montenegro); Budućnost Bemax	(Bosnia and Herzegovina); Orlovi	(Bulgaria); Montana 2003
2022–23; Details	Podgorica (MNE)	(Slovenia); Cinkarna Celje	66:64	(Montenegro); Budućnost Bemax	(Serbia); Vojvodina 021	(Bulgaria); Montana 2003
2023–24; Details	Podgorica (MNE)	(Slovenia); Cinkarna Celje	64:59	(Montenegro); Budućnost Bemax	(Bosnia and Herzegovina); Orlovi	(Serbia); Sloga Požega
2024–25; Details	Celje (SLO)	(Montenegro); Budućnost Bemax	71:64	(Slovenia); Cinkarna Celje	(Bulgaria); Montana 2003	(Bulgaria); Beroe
2025–26; Details	Podgorica (MNE)	(Bulgaria); Montana 2003	69:66	(Slovenia); Cinkarna Celje	(Montenegro); Budućnost Bemax	(Serbia); Partizan 1953

== Champions ==
Team	Winners	Runners-up	Years won	Years runner-up
(Croatia) Šibenik	5	5	2005, 2006, 2008, 2009, 2011	2002, 2003, 2004, 2007, 2010
(Slovenia) Cinkarna Celje	5	3	2002, 2017, 2022, 2023, 2024	2018, 2020, 2025
(Montenegro) Budućnost Podgorica	4	5	2016, 2018, 2020, 2025	2019, 2021, 2022, 2023, 2024
(Croatia) Gospić	2	3	2004, 2010	2005, 2008, 2011
(Bulgaria) Beroe	2	1	2019, 2021	2017
(Serbia) Partizan	2	–	2012, 2013	–
(Serbia) Radivoj Korać	1	2	2014	2013, 2015
(Bosnia and Herzegovina) Željezničar Sarajevo	1	–	2003	–
(Bulgaria) CSKA Sofia	1	–	2007	–
(Italy) Umana Reyer Venezia	1	–	2015	–
(Serbia) Vojvodina	–	1	–	2006
(Montenegro) Jedinstvo Bijelo Polje	–	1	–	2009
(Bosnia and Herzegovina) Čelik Zenica	–	1	–	2012
(Serbia) Crvena zvezda	–	1	–	2014
(Croatia) Medveščak	–	1	–	2016

== Notable persons ==
=== Former players ===
Belarus

- Olga Masilionene

Bosnia and Herzegovina

- Milica Deura

Croatia

- Ivona Bogoje
- Luca Ivanković
- Jelena Ivezić
- Antonija Mišura
- Nika Mühl
- Sandra Popović
- Marija Vrsaljko

Czech Republic

- Lucie Conkova

North Macedonia

- Jelena Antić

Montenegro

- Jasmina Bigović
- Aleksandra Vujović
- Iva Perovanović
- Ana Turčinović
- Božica Mujović

Serbia

- Tijana Ajduković
- Kristina Baltić
- Mirjana Beronja
- Dajana Butulija
- Nataša Bučevac
- Ana Dabović
- Milica Dabović
- Ivana Grubor
- Brankica Hadžović

- Ivona Jerković
- Nevena Jovanović
- Dragana Stanković
- Nataša Kovačević
- Ivanka Matić
- Maja Miljković
- Tamara Radočaj
- Biljana Stanković
- Bojana Vulić
- Saša Čađo

Slovenia

- Nika Barič

United States

- Latasha Byears
- Constance Jinks
- Tiffani Johnson

- Sheena Moore
- Brooke Queenan
- Jasmine Stone
- Latoya Williams

=== Former coaches ===
- Stipe Bralić
- Slađan Ivić
- Marina Maljković
- Dragan Vuković

== Awards ==
=== Most Valuable Player ===
Season	Player	Team
2001–02	n / a	
2002–03	n / a	
2003–04	n / a	
2004–05	(Croatia) Anđa Jelavić (Croatia) Vanda Baranović (Serbia and Montenegro) Jelena Dubljević	Šibenik Jolly JBS; Gospić Croatia Osiguranje (Serbia and Montenegro) Budućnost Podgorica
2005–06	(Croatia) Sandra Popović	(Croatia) Šibenik Jolly JBS
2006–07	(United States) Latasha Byears	(Bulgaria) CSKA Sofia
2007–08	(Czech Republic) Lucie Conkova	(Slovenia) Merkur Celje
2008–09	(United States) Constance Jinks	(Croatia) Šibenik Jolly JBS
2009–10	(Croatia) Jelena Ivezić	Gospić Croatia Osiguranje
2010–11	(Montenegro) Ana Turčinović	(Slovenia) Merkur Celje
2011–12	(Serbia) Tamara Radočaj	(Serbia) Partizan Galenika
2012–13	(Serbia) Milica Dabović	(Serbia) Partizan Galenika
2013–14	(United States) Tavelyn James	(Slovenia) Athlete Celje
2014–15	(Bosnia and Herzegovina) Marica Gajić	(Slovenia) Athlete Celje
2015–16	(Montenegro) Božica Mujović	(Montenegro) Budućnost Volcano
2016–17	(Bosnia and Herzegovina) Nikolina Delić	(Bosnia and Herzegovina) Play Off Ultra
2017–18	(Slovenia) Zala Friškovec	(Slovenia) Cinkarna Celje
2018–19	(Bosnia and Herzegovina) Nikolina Babić	(Montenegro) Budućnost Bemax
2019–20	(Croatia) Josipa Pavić	(Croatia) Trešnjevka 2009
2020–21	(Serbia) Aleksandra Mužević	(Bosnia and Herzegovina) Orlovi
2021–22	(Democratic Republic of the Congo) La Mama Kapinga Maweja	(Croatia) ŽKK Plamen Požega
2022–23		
2023–24	(Brazil) Thayna Silva	(Slovenia) Cinkarna Celje

=== Final Four Most Valuable Player ===
Season	Player	Team
2001–02	(Slovenia) Katja Temnik	(Slovenia) Merkur Celje
2002–03	(Croatia) Mirna Deak	(Bosnia and Herzegovina) Željezničar Sarajevo
2003–04	(Croatia) Vanda Baranović-Urukalo	(Croatia) Gospić Industrogradnja
2004–05	(Croatia) Ivona Bogoje	(Croatia) Šibenik Jolly JBS
2005–06	(Croatia) Sandra Popović	(Croatia) Šibenik Jolly JBS
2006–07	(United States) Latasha Byears	(Bulgaria) CSKA Sofia
2007–08	(Croatia) Anđa Jelavić	(Croatia) Šibenik Jolly JBS
2008–09	(Montenegro) Nataša Popović	(Montenegro) Jedinstvo Bijelo Polje
2009–10	(United States) Carla Thomas	Gospić Croatia Osiguranje
2010–11	n / a	
2011–12	(Serbia) Tamara Radočaj	(Serbia) Partizan Galenika
2012–13	(Serbia) Nataša Bučevac	(Serbia) Vojvodina NIS
2013–14	(United States) Haleigh Lankster	(Montenegro) Budućnost Volcano
2014–15	(United States) Shannon McCallum	(Italy) Umana Reyer Venezia
2015–16	(Montenegro) Irena Matović	(Montenegro) Budućnost Volcano
2016–17	(Slovenia) Annamaria Prezelj	(Slovenia) Athlete Celje
2017–18	(Montenegro) Božica Mujović	(Montenegro) Budućnost Volcano
2018–19	(Montenegro) Snežana Aleksić	(Bulgaria) Beroe
2019–20	Final Four has been canceled due to the COVID-19 pandemic	
2020–21	(Bulgaria) Jaklin Zlatanova	(Bulgaria) Beroe

=== Top Scorer ===
Season	Player	Team
2001–02	n / a	
2002–03	n / a	
2003–04	n / a	
2004–05	(Serbia and Montenegro) Anica Tešić	(Bosnia and Herzegovina) Željezničar Sarajevo
2005–06	(Serbia and Montenegro) Ana Dabović	(Serbia and Montenegro) Herceg Novi
2006–07	n / a	
2007–08	n / a	
2008–09	n / a	
2009–10	n / a	
2010–11	(Slovenia) Ljubica Kure	(Slovenia) AJM Maribor
2011–12	(Slovenia) Teja Oblak	(Slovenia) Athlete Celje
2012–13	(Serbia) Sanja Orozović	(Slovenia) Athlete Celje
2013–14	(United States) Tavelyn James	(Slovenia) Athlete Celje
2014–15	(United States) Haleigh Lankster	(Slovenia) Grosbasket
2015–16	(Bosnia and Herzegovina) Marica Gajić	(Slovenia) Athlete Celje
2016–17	(United States) Monique Reid	(Bulgaria) Beroe
2017–18	(Bosnia and Herzegovina) Nikolina Džebo	(Bosnia and Herzegovina) Play Off Ultra
2018–19	(Montenegro) Ana Poček	(Bulgaria) Beroe
2019–20	(Serbia) Jelena Nikpaljević	(Bosnia and Herzegovina) Orlovi
2020–21	(Serbia) Tamara Rajić	(Bosnia and Herzegovina) Orlovi

== Sponsors ==
Title sponsor

- BTravel (Croatian tourist agency) (June 2017 - 2018)

== See also ==
- Vojko Herksel Cup
