= Barbara Perić =

Croatian footballer (born 1987)

Personal information
- Date of birth: 17 August 1987 (age 39)
- Position: Midfielder

International career^{‡}
Years	Team	Apps	(Gls)
2010–2012	Croatia	14	(0)
- ‡ National team caps and goals as of 15 September 2012

Barbara Perić (born 17 August 1987) is a Croatian footballer who plays as a midfielder. She has been a member of the Croatia women's national team.
