= Branka Luković =

Serbian basketball player

Partizan Belgrade
- Position: Power forward
- League: First League of Serbia; Adriatic League Women

Personal information
- Born: January 23, 1995 (age 31) Belgrade, Serbia, FR Yugoslavia
- Listed height: 188 cm (6 ft 2 in)

Career information
- WNBA draft: 2017: undrafted
- Playing career: 2011–present

Career history
- 2011–2013: Voždovac
- 2013–2015: Partizan
- 2015–2016: Badel 1862
- 2016: UCAM Jairis
- 2016: Partizan
- 2016–2017: Valencia Basket
- 2017–2018: Herner TC
- 2018–2019: Brose Bamberg
- 2019: Canik Belediyespor
- 2019–2020: SBŠ Ostrava
- 2020: Cortegada
- 2020–2021: Partizan
Medals
Women's basketball
Representing Serbia
European U18 Championship
Bronze medal – third place	2013 Croatia	Team

Branka Luković (born January 23, 1995) is a Serbian professional basketball player. She played for the Partizan, Badel 1862, Voždovac, UCAM Jairis, Valencia Basket, Herner TC, Brose Bamberg, Canik Belediyespor, SBŠ Ostrava and Cortegada

== Personal life ==
Branka comes from a basketball family. Her father is Ljubisav Luković, a former basketball player and current basketball coach, her mother was also a basketball player. Branka has two older brothers Uroš and Marko who are also professional basketball players.
