= Nataša Popović =

Montenegrin basketball player

No. 7 – Reims Basket Féminin
- Position: Center
- League: LFB

Personal information
- Born: 14 April 1982 (age 44) Nikšić, Yugoslavia
- Listed height: 6 ft 3 in (1.91 m)

Career information
- WNBA draft: 2004: undrafted

Career history
- AE Sedis Bàsquet
- 2007-2008: Ragusa Dubrovnik
- 2009–2010: Šibenik Jolly
- 2010–2011: Jedinstvo Bijelo Polje
- 2011–2012: Budućnost Podgorica
- 2012–2013: Spartak Noginsk
- 2013–2014: Levski Sofia
- 2014–2016: Čelik Zenica
- 2016–2018: Reims Basket
- 2018–2019: SIG Strasbourg

Nataša Popović (born 14 April 1982) was a Montenegrin female basketball player.
