= Annamaria Prezelj =

Slovenian basketball player

No. 9 – Botaş SK
- Position: Shooting guard
- League: Turkish Super League

Personal information
- Born: July 30, 1997 (age 29) Ljubljana, Slovenia
- Listed height: 5 ft 9 in (1.75 m)

Annamaria Prezelj (born July 30, 1997) is a Slovenian basketball player for Botaş SK and the Slovenian national team.

She participated at the EuroBasket Women 2017.
