= ŽKK Kvarner =

Croatian Women's basketball club from Rijeka

- Leagues: Croatian League; MŽRKL
- Founded: 2006
- Arena: Športska dvorana Dinko Lukarić (capacity: 900)
- Location: Rijeka, Croatia
- Team colors: Blue and White
- President: (Croatia) Viktorija Agejenko
- Head coach: (Croatia) Damir Rajković
- Website: http://zkk-kvarner.hr/
Home	Away

ŽKK Kvarner is a Croatian Women's basketball club from Rijeka. The club's greatest success was in the 2014–15 season of the Croatian Women's Basketball League, when they finished as runners-up.

== History ==
=== Names in history ===
- 2006-2014 - Pleter
- 2014-currently - Kvarner

== Notable former players ==
- Iva Serdar
- Katarina Mrčela
- Martina Gambiraža
