= Iva Borović =

Croatian basketball player

No. 8 – Medveščak
- Position: Point guard
- League: First League of Croatia

Personal information
- Born: 5 October 1988 (age 38) Zadar, SFR Yugoslavia
- Listed height: 1.70 m (5 ft 7 in)

Career information
- WNBA draft: 2010: undrafted
- Playing career: 2008–present

Career history
- 2008–2010: Agram Zagreb
- 2010: Zadar
- 2010–present: Medveščak

Iva Borović (born 5 October 1988 in Zadar, SFR Yugoslavia) is a Croatian female basketball player.
