= Sanja Mandić =

Serbian basketball player

No. 10 – ŽKK Partizan
- Position: Point guard
- League: First Women's Basketball League of Serbia

Personal information
- Born: 14 March 1995 (age 31) Belgrade, FR Yugoslavia
- Listed height: 5 ft 10 in (1.78 m)

Career information
- Playing career: 2009–present

Career history
- 2009–2016: Radivoj Korać
- 2016–2018: PEAC-Pécs
- 2018: Energa Toruń
- 2019: UNI Győr
- 2019: ŽKK Crvena zvezda
- 2019–2020: Ślęza Wrocław
- 2020: PINKK-Pécsi 424
- 2020–2022: Rutronik Stars Keltern
- 2022–2023: BC Samara
- 2023–2024: Saarlouis Royals
- 2024–2025: BC Castors Braine
- 2025–2026: ŽKK Duga Šabac
- 2026–present: ŽKK Partizan
Medals
Women's basketball
Representing Serbia
European U18 Championship
Bronze medal – third place	2012 Romania
Bronze medal – third place	2013 Croatia

Sanja Mandić (Serbian Cyrillic: Сања Мандић; born 14 March 1995) is a Serbian basketball player for ŽKK Partizan and the Serbian national team, where she participated at the 2014 FIBA World Championship and EuroBasket Women 2017.

== Honours ==
Radivoj Korać

- National Championship of Serbia (3): 2013–14, 2014–15, 2015–16
- National Cup of Serbia (1): 2013-14
- Adriatic League Women (1): 2013-14

Rutronik Stars Keltern

- Premier Women's Basketball Championship in Germany (1): 2020-21
- German Women's Basketball Cup (1): 2020-21
