= WBC Montana 2003 =

Montana 2003
- Leagues: First League of Bulgaria; Adriatic League
- Founded: 1989 (refounded 2003)
- Arena: Sports Hall Mladost
- Location: Montana, Bulgaria
- Team colors: Blue and white
- President: Iliandar Iliev
- Head coach: Stefan Mihaylov
- Championships: 6 Bulgarian championships 10 Bulgarian cups 3 Bulgarian Super cups

WBC Montana 2003 is a women's basketball club from Montana in Bulgaria. The first women's team of Montana took professional status in 1989 under the name "Sepetemvriyska Slava." In 1992 it was renamed just "Montana." The team ceased to exist in 2002 but was refounded in 2003 under the name "Montana 2003".

== Title ==
- Bulgarian Women's Basketball Championship (6): 2000, 2005, 2016, 2018, 2019, 2025
- Bulgarian Women's Basketball Cup (10): 1995, 1996, 1998, 2000, 2009, 2014, 2016, 2018, 2019, 2025.
- Bulgarian Women's Basketball Super Cup (3): 2017, 2018, 2019.

== Other successes ==
- WABA League : 2018, 2020, 2021, 2025
