= Živa Zdolšek =

Slovenian basketball player

No. 4 – KK Triglav Kranj
- Position: Shooting guard
- League: SKLŽ

Personal information
- Born: 10 October 1989 (age 37) Celje, Slovenia
- Listed height: 5 ft 10 in (1.78 m)
Medals
Women's 3x3 basketball
Representing Slovenia
FIBA Europe 3x3 Championships
Silver medal – second place	2014 Bucharest	Team

Živa Zdolšek (born 10 October 1989) is a Slovenian basketball player for KK Triglav Kranj and the Slovenian national team.

She participated at the EuroBasket Women 2017.
