= WBC Beroe =

- Nickname: WBC Beroe
- Leagues: Bulgarian Championship
- Founded: 1980; 46 years ago
- History: Beroe
- Arena: Obshinska
- Location: Stara Zagora, Bulgaria
- Team colors: White and Green
- President: Valentin Totev
- Team manager: Ivan Nikolov
- Head coach: Tania Gateva
- Championships: 6 Bulgarian Championship; 4 Bulgarian Cup; 2 Adriatic League
Home	Away

The women's basketball team of Beroe is headquartered in Stara Zagora, Bulgaria. The team was established in the 1980s. From 1995–2004, the team was eliminated from professional basketball and instead won the Bulgarian Women's Championship. The biggest successes of WBC Beroe is winning the state championship in 1990 and 1992. During the 2016–2017 season the team reached final of the WABA League.

== Successes ==
- Bulgarian Women's Basketball Championship:
  - (6): 1990, 1992, 2021, 2022, 2023, 2024
    - (6): 1991, 1995, 2006, 2016, 2018, 2019
    - (4): 2005, 2007, 2008, 2017
- Bulgarian Women's Basketball Super Cup:
  - (1): 2018
- Bulgarian Women's Basketball Cup:
  - (4): 2020, 2021, 2022, 2023
    - (7): 2004, 2006, 2016, 2018, 2019, 2024, 2025
    - (4): 2001, 2005, 2007, 2017
- WABA League:
  - (2): 2019, 2021
    - (1): 2017
