= Božica Mujović =

Montenegrin basketball player

No. 1 – Piešťanské Čajky
- Position: Point guard

Personal information
- Born: 7 January 1996 (age 30) Bijelo Polje, FR Yugoslavia
- Listed height: 5 ft 10 in (1.78 m)

Career information
- WNBA draft: 2018: undrafted
- Playing career: 2010–present

Career history
- 2010–2011: Jedinstvo Bijelo Polje
- 2011–2018: Budućnost Podgorica
- 2018–2019: Wisła Can-Pack Kraków
- 2019–2020: Al-Qázeres Extremadura
- 2020–2021: Elitzur Ramla
- 2021–2022: PINKK-Pécsi 424
- 2022–present: Piešťanské Čajky

Career highlights
- 8× First A League of Montenegro champion (2011–2018); 8× Cup of Montenegro champion (2011–2018); 2× Regional Friendly League champion (2013, 2014); 2× Adriatic League champion (2016, 2018)

Božica Mujović (born 7 January 1996 in Bijelo Polje) is a Montenegrin women's basketball player. She plays for Piešťanské Čajky at position Point guard. She is also a member of national team of Montenegro.
