= ŽKK Medveščak =

- Leagues: First League of Croatia; Adriatic League
- Founded: June 1945
- History: Medveščak Zagreb (1961-present)
- Arena: ŠD Pešćenica (capacity: 600)
- Location: Zagreb, Croatia
- Team colors: Yellow and Blue
- President: (Croatia) Milan Perić
- Head coach: (Croatia) Braslav Turić
- Championships: 6 National League; 5 National Cup
- Website: zkk-medvescak.com

ŽKK Medveščak is a Croatian women's basketball club from Zagreb. It currently plays in First League of Croatia and Adriatic League.

== History ==
=== Names in history ===
- 1945—194? – Slavija Zagreb
- 194?—1949 – Dinamo Zagreb
- 1949—195? – Naprijed Zagreb
- 195?—19?? – Šalata Zagreb
- 19??—1961 – Metalac Zagreb
- 1961—currently – Medveščak Zagreb

== Honours ==
=== Domestic ===
National Championships – 6

- First League of Croatia:
  - Winners (6): 2014, 2015, 2016, 2017, 2018, 2019

National Cups – 3

- Cup of Croatia:
  - Winners (5): 2015, 2016, 2017, 2018, 2019
  - Runners-up (1): 2009

=== International ===
International titles – 0

- Adriatic League:
  - Runners-up (1) : 2016
