= ŽKK Celje =

Cinkarna Celje
- Leagues: Slovenian League; WABA League
- Founded: 1993; 33 years ago
- Arena: Gimnazija Celje – Center (capacity: 1,500)
- Location: Celje, Slovenia
- Team colors: Red, white
- Main sponsor: Cinkarna Celje
- President: Borut Kop
- Head coach: Damir Grgić
- Championships: 22 Slovenian Leagues; 20 Slovenian Cups; 5 Adriatic Leagues
- Website: zkkcelje.si
Home	Away

Ženski košarkarski klub Celje (English: Women's Basketball Club Celje), also known as ŽKK Cinkarna Celje due to sponsorship reasons, is a Slovenian women's basketball club from Celje.

== History ==
=== Name changes ===
- 1993 — Metka Celje
- 1993–1996 — Celje
- 1996–2000 — Ingrad Celje
- 2000–2011 — Merkur Celje
- 2011–2017 — Athlete Celje
- 2017–present — Cinkarna Celje

== Honours ==
=== Domestic ===
- Slovenian Women's Basketball League

Winners (22): 2000, 2003, 2004, 2005, 2006, 2008, 2009, 2012, 2013, 2014, 2015, 2016, 2017, 2018, 2019, 2020, 2021, 2022, 2023, 2024, 2025, 2026
Runners-up (7): 1996, 1998, 2001, 2002, 2007, 2010, 2011

- Slovenian Women's Basketball Cup

Winners (20): 2003, 2005, 2006, 2007, 2008, 2009, 2010, 2012, 2013, 2015, 2016, 2017, 2019, 2020, 2021, 2022, 2023, 2024, 2025, 2026
Runners-up (9): 1996, 1998, 1999, 2000, 2001, 2002, 2004, 2011, 2018

=== International ===
- WABA League

Winners (5): 2002, 2017, 2022, 2023, 2024
Runners-up (3): 2018, 2025, 2026
