= ŽKK Budućnost Podgorica =

- Leagues: First A League of Montenegro; Adriatic League
- Arena: Bemax Arena (capacity: 2,500)
- Location: Podgorica, Montenegro
- Team colors: Blue and white
- Head coach: (Montenegro) Vladan Radović
- Championships: 13 National Championships; 13 National Cups; 2 Regional Friendly League; 3 Adriatic League

Active sport clubs of SD Budućnost
Football	Basketball	Handball Women
Volleyball	Boxing	Athletics
Basketball Women	Karate	Rugby
Shooting	Volleyball Women	Judo
Ballooning	Table tennis	Taekwondo
Kayaking	Rowing	Sambo
Chess	Bocce	Hiking
Kendo	Aikido	Savate
Fishing	Fly Fishing	Horsing
Kung Fu	Jiu Jitsu	Unifight

Brazilian jiu-jitsu

Ženski košarkaški klub Budućnost Podgorica (Montenegrin: Женски кошаркашки клуб Будућност Подгорица) is a Montenegrin women's basketball team from Podgorica, Montenegro.

ŽKK Budućnost is a part of Budućnost Podgorica sports society.

== Names through club's history ==
The club has had the following names due to sponsorship reasons:

Year	Club sponsor (settlement)
2013–2015	ŽKK Budućnost Volcano (Podgorica)
2015–present	ŽKK Budućnost Bemax (Podgorica)

== Honours ==
=== Domestic ===
National Championships – 16

- First League of FR Yugoslavia / Serbia and Montenegro:
  - Winners (2) : 2002, 2003
- First A League of Montenegro:
  - Winners (14) : 2007, 2008, 2012, 2013, 2014, 2015, 2016, 2017, 2018, 2019, 2021, 2022, 2023, 2024
  - Runners-up (1) : 2009

National Cups – 17

- Cup of FR Yugoslavia / Serbia and Montenegro
  - Runners-up (2) : 2002, 2003
- Cup of Montenegro:
  - Winners (15) : 2007, 2008, 2012, 2013, 2014, 2015, 2016, 2017, 2018, 2019, 2020, 2021, 2022, 2023, 2024
  - Runners-up (3) : 2009, 2010, 2011

=== International ===
International titles – 5

- Reginal Friendly League:
  - Winners (2) : 2013, 2014
- Adriatic League:
  - Winners (3) : 2016, 2018, 2020
  - Runners-up (5) : 2019, 2021, 2022, 2023, 2024

== Famous players ==
- (Montenegro) Jelena Dubljević
- (Montenegro) Hajdana Radunović
- (Montenegro) Jelena Škerović
- (Montenegro) Snežana Aleksić
- (Montenegro) Iva Perovanović
- (Montenegro) Nataša Popović
- (Montenegro) Ana Turčinović
- (Montenegro) Božica Mujović
- (Montenegro) Marija Leković
- (Serbia) Ana Joković
- (Serbia) Bojana Vulić

== See also ==
- SD Budućnost Podgorica
- KK Budućnost Podgorica
