= 2016–17 WABA League League 8 =

League 8 of the WABA League, or Superleague, took place between 18 January 2017 and 15 March 2017.

The four best ranked teams advanced to the Final Four. The points against teams from the same preliminary round were taken over.

== Standings ==
Place	Team	Pld	W	L	PF	PA	Diff	Pts	
1.	(Bulgaria) Montana 2003	14	10	4	1046	965	+81	24	Final Four
2.	(Bulgaria) Beroe	14	10	4	1039	910	+129	24	Final Four
3.	(Montenegro) Budućnost Bemax	14	10	4	986	857	+129	24	Final Four
4.	(Slovenia) Athlete Celje	14	9	5	1041	991	+50	23	Final Four
5.	(Serbia) Crvena zvezda	14	6	8	972	1044	-72	20	
6.	(Slovenia) Triglav Kranj (-1)	14	6	8	765	833	-68	19	
7.	(Bosnia and Herzegovina) Play Off Ultra	14	3	11	1005	1107	-102	17	
8.	(Serbia) Partizan 1953	14	2	12	889	1036	-147	16	

== Fixtures and results ==
All times given below are in Central European Time (for the match played in Bulgaria is time expressed in Eastern European Time).

=== Game 1 ===
18 January 2017
18:00

Report

Beroe	93–75	Crvena zvezda
Scoring by quarter: 22:12, 24:13, 17:33, 30:17
Pts: Reid 28; Rebs: Reid 17; Asts: Pye 4		Pts: A. Katanić 18; Rebs: A. Katanić 6 Asts: A. Katanić 3

Municipal Hall, Stara Zagora
Attendance: 400
Referees: Stojčevski, Petrović, Petrovski

19 January 2017
19:00

Report

Triglav Kranj	57–69	Athlete Celje
Scoring by quarter: 12:16, 12:25, 18:20, 15:8
Pts: Abramovič 21; Rebs: Zdolšek 6 Asts: Žibert 5		Pts: Prezelj 25; Rebs: Slonjšak 7 Asts: Krošelj, Ocvirk 4

Športna dvorana Planina, Kranj
Attendance: 150
Referees: Blašković, Kovačević, Vedriš

18 January 2017
18:00

Report

Play Off Ultra	87–96	Montana 2003
Scoring by quarter: 15:18, 23:27, 25:28, 24:23
Pts: N. Delić 27; Rebs: Marković 8 Asts: N. Delić 5		Pts: Dimitrova 25; Rebs: Allen 9 Asts: Allen 7

Skenderija, Sarajevo
Attendance: n / a
Referees: Jevtović, Prpa, Virijević

18 January 2017
17:00

Report

Partizan 1953	53–71	Budućnost Bemax
Scoring by quarter: 12:20, 16:23, 11:11, 14:17
Pts: Živadinović 14; Rebs: Milovanović 9 Asts: Živadinović 5		Pts: Matović 19; Rebs: Stjepanović 11; Asts: Matović 4

Sports Hall Ranko Žeravica, Belgrade
Attendance: 150
Referees: Tresoglavić, Mikulić, Knez

=== Game 2 ===
25 January 2017
18:30

Report

Montana 2003	87–65	Partizan 1953
Scoring by quarter: 26:18, 17:23, 27:18, 17:6
Pts: Allen 20; Rebs: Allen, Makarieva 6 Asts: Allen 8		Pts: Matić 20; Rebs: Matić 6 Asts: Ćulafić, Živadinović 5

Sports Hall Mladost, Montana
Attendance: 350
Referees: Boškoski, Zlatevski, Gjorevski

25 January 2017
18:00

Report

Athlete Celje	87–85	Play Off Ultra
Scoring by quarter: 16:23, 16:23, 36:15, 19:24
Pts: Evans 27; Rebs: Evans 15; Asts: Prezelj 5		Pts: Ceazer 23; Rebs: Džebo 8 Asts: N. Delić 9

Dvorana Gimnazije Celje – Center, Celje
Attendance: 100
Referees: Pavičić, Anzulović, Ljolje

25 January 2017
18:00

Report

Crvena zvezda	71–55	Triglav Kranj
Scoring by quarter: 18:25, 23:17, 20:5, 10:8
Pts: Bogićević 23; Rebs: Mišeljić 9 Asts: Bogićević 3		Pts: Kalušić 21; Rebs: Seničar 10; Asts: Abramovič 6

Basket City Hall, Belgrade
Attendance: 55
Referees: Katić, Pencinger, Grubišić

26 January 2017
18:30

Report

Budućnost Bemax	56–65	Beroe
Scoring by quarter: 13:24, 18:15, 12:17, 13:9
Pts: Topuzović 12; Rebs: Topuzović 9 Asts: Matović 6		Pts: Reid 23; Rebs: Reid 12; Asts: Pye 2

University Sports & Culture Hall, Podgorica
Attendance: 450
Referees: Roglić, Živaljić, Jurjević

=== Game 3 ===
2 February 2017
19:30

Report

Play Off Ultra	70–80	Crvena zvezda
Scoring by quarter: 14:22, 21:20, 20:22, 15:16
Pts: A. Delić 17; Rebs: Marković 6 Asts: N. Delić 7		Pts: Prlja 26; Rebs: Mišeljić 6 Asts: Prlja, Bogićević 3

Skenderija, Sarajevo
Attendance: n/a
Referees: n/a

1 February 2017
18:00

Report

Beroe	66–71 (OT)	Montana 2003
Scoring by quarter: 17:20, 21:14, 8:16, 16:12, Overtime: 4:9
Pts: Pye 15; Rebs: Perkins 9 Asts: Zackery 7		Pts: Burdgess 22; Rebs: Burdgess 11; Asts: Stoycheva 6

Municipal Hall, Stara Zagora
Attendance: 200
Referees: n/a

2 February 2017
19:00

Report

Triglav Kranj	43–55	Budućnost Bemax
Scoring by quarter: 12:19, 9:15, 9:10, 13:11
Pts: Kalušić 16; Rebs: Zdolšek 8 Asts: Žibert, Kalušić 3		Pts: Kapor 17; Rebs: Topuzović 17; Asts: Topuzović 6

Športna dvorana Planina, Kranj
Attendance: 100
Referees: n/a

1 February 2017
16:00

Report

Partizan 1953	58–82	Athlete Celje
Scoring by quarter: 13:19, 17:22, 12:24, 16:17
Pts: Mitić 12; Rebs: Milovanović 11; Asts: Stojanović, Todorović 3		Pts: Slonjšak 31; Rebs: Slonjšak 13; Asts: Krošelj 6

Vizura Sport Hall, Belgrade
Attendance: 70
Referees: n/a

=== Game 4 ===
8 February 2017
19:30

Report

Crvena zvezda	69–59	Partizan 1953
Scoring by quarter: 19:19, 13:16, 25:10, 12:14
Pts: Bogićević 23; Rebs: A. Katanić 7 Asts: A. Katanić 6		Pts: Matić 20; Rebs: Matić 11; Asts: Petrović, Živadinović 4

Basket City Hall, Belgrade
Attendance: 300
Referees: n/a

9 February 2017
19:00

Report

Budućnost Bemax	83–60	Play Off Ultra
Scoring by quarter: 19:13, 20:17, 22:15, 22:15
Pts: Matović 26; Rebs: Fall 12; Asts: Matović 7		Pts: Džebo 16; Rebs: Džebo 6 Asts: N. Delić 6

University Sports & Culture Hall, Podgorica
Attendance: 350
Referees: n/a

8 February 2017
18:30

Report

Montana 2003	72–67	Triglav Kranj
Scoring by quarter: 12:17, 16:16, 22:19, 22:15
Pts: Burdgess 17; Rebs: Burdgess 7 Asts: Allen 9		Pts: Zdolšek 17; Rebs: Seničar 8 Asts: Seničar 6

Sports Hall Mladost, Montana
Attendance: 350
Referees: n/a

8 February 2017
18:00

Report

Athlete Celje	64–67	Beroe
Scoring by quarter: 16:18, 11:15, 14:17, 23:17
Pts: Slonjšak 22; Rebs: Slonjšak 11; Asts: Prezelj, Slonjšak 4		Pts: Kostova 15; Rebs: Miteva 11; Asts: Ivanova, Pye 5

Dvorana Gimnazije Celje – Center, Celje
Attendance: 200
Referees: n/a

=== Game 5 ===
15 February 2017
18:00

Report

Crvena zvezda	83–81	Beroe
Scoring by quarter: 19:27, 26:11, 20:18, 18:25
Pts: I. Katanić, Naumčev 16; Rebs: Naumčev, Đorđević 6 Asts: I. Katanić 5		Pts: Perkins, Zackery 18; Rebs: Miteva 8 Asts: Pye 6

Basket City Hall, Belgrade
Attendance: 100
Referees: Katić, Pencinger, Holjevac

15 February 2017
18:00

Report

Athlete Celje	60–61	Triglav Kranj
Scoring by quarter: 13:10, 16:23, 19:11, 12:17
Pts: Prezelj 16; Rebs: Evans 18; Asts: Slonjšak, Evans 3		Pts: Zdolšek 16; Rebs: Seničar 11; Asts: Meden 5

Dvorana Gimnazije Celje – Center, Celje
Attendance: 150
Referees: Štrok, Kovačević, Nakić

15 February 2017
18:30

Report

Montana 2003	93–70	Play Off Ultra
Scoring by quarter: 28:14, 18:14, 27:14, 20:18
Pts: Sharenkapova 16; Rebs: Allen 8 Asts: Allen 7		Pts: N. Delić 23; Rebs: N. Delić 15; Asts: Ćorda 5

Sports Hall Mladost, Montana
Attendance: 550
Referees: Jevtović, Vesković, Prpa

14 February 2017
18:30

Report

Budućnost Bemax	65–58	Partizan 1953
Scoring by quarter: 16:11, 16:15, 23:12, 10:20
Pts: Matović 23; Rebs: Topuzović 10; Asts: Babić 6		Pts: Špikić, Matić 16; Rebs: Milovanović 7 Asts: Ćulafić 5

University Sports&Culture Hall, Podgorica
Attendance: 350
Referees: Roglić, Živaljić, Bajramović

=== Game 6 ===
4 February 2017
15:00

Report

Partizan 1953	73–66	Montana 2003
Scoring by quarter: 22:18, 21:8, 14:16, 16:24
Pts: Živadinović 26; Rebs: Milovanović 9 Asts: Živadinović 9		Pts: Sharenkapova 15; Rebs: Burdgess 11; Asts: Allen 7

Vizura Sport Hall, Belgrade
Attendance: 48
Referees: Holjevac, Pongračić, Mujkić

23 February 2017
19:00

Report

Play Off Ultra	82–88	Athlete Celje
Scoring by quarter: 17:21, 32:20, 17:19, 16:28
Pts: Marković 20; Rebs: Marković 10; Asts: N. Delić 8		Pts: Evans 29; Rebs: Evans 18; Asts: Slonjšak 7

Skenderija, Sarajevo
Attendance: 100
Referees: Savović, Radinović, Vujičić

22 February 2017
19:00

Report

Triglav Kranj	68–58	Crvena zvezda
Scoring by quarter: 17:18, 15:9, 21:8, 15:23
Pts: Kalušić 21; Rebs: Kalušić 7 Asts: Abramovič 8		Pts: Prlja 12; Rebs: Đorđević 4 Asts: Mišeljić 4

Športna dvorana Planina, Kranj
Attendance: 120
Referees: Stanković, Šverko, Zrnić

22 February 2017
18:00

Report

Beroe	68–54	Budućnost Bemax
Pts: Zackery 23; Rebs: Zackery 15; Asts: Reid 5		Pts: Mujović 17; Rebs: Mujović, Fall 8 Asts: Mujović 4

Municipal Hall, Stara Zagora
Attendance: 150
Referees: Jevtović, Vesković, Ninković

=== Game 7 ===
2 March 2017
16:00

Report

Crvena zvezda	75–72	Play Off Ultra
Scoring by quarter: 18:14, 17:18, 17:19, 23:21
Pts: Prlja 17; Rebs: A. Katanić, Čubra 8 Asts: A. Katanić 6		Pts: Ceazer 17; Rebs: Ceazer 14; Asts: N. Delić 9

Basket City Hall, Belgrade
Attendance: 23
Referees: Katić, Pencinger, Grubišić

28 February 2017
18:30

Report

Montana 2003	81–58	Beroe
Scoring by quarter: 29:13, 18:16, 21:12, 13:17
Pts: Sharenkapova 19; Rebs: Stoycheva 7 Asts: Stoycheva, Allen 7		Pts: Reid 30; Rebs: Tomova, Reid 5 Asts: PerkinsReid 4

Sports Hall Mladost, Montana
Attendance: 400
Referees: Terzievski, Antovski, Lazov

2 March 2017
19:00

Report

Budućnost Bemax	20–0	Triglav Kranj

University Sports & Culture Hall, Podgorica
Attendance: 0
Referees: Živaljić, Mjeda, Bajramović

1 March 2017
18:00

Report

Athlete Celje	71–42	Partizan 1953
Pts: Evans 16; Rebs: Evans 12; Asts: Slonjšak 5		Pts: Petrović 13; Rebs: Petrović 6 Asts: Živadinović 4

Dvorana Gimnazije Celje – Center, Celje
Attendance: 100
Referees: Reić, Muhvić, Galić

=== Game 8 ===
15 March 2017
17:00

Report

Partizan 1953	70–76	Crvena zvezda
Scoring by quarter: 13:16, 18:17, 18:19, 21:24
Pts: Špikić, Mitić 18; Rebs: Milovanović 7 Asts: Ćulafić 13		Pts: Naumčev 25; Rebs: A. Katanić 10; Asts: Prlja 7

Sports Hall Ranko Žeravica, Belgrade
Attendance: 100
Referees: Ninković, Prpa, Virijević

9 March 2017
19:30

Report

Play Off Ultra	93–98	Budućnost Bemax
Scoring by quarter: 28:21, 26:26, 17:27, 22:24
Pts: A. Delić 33; Rebs: A. Delić 10; Asts: A. Delić 6		Pts: Matović 36; Rebs: Stjepanović 10; Asts: Mujović 15

Skenderija, Sarajevo
Attendance: n / a
Referees: Jevtović, Vesković, Prpa

9 March 2017
19:00

Report

Triglav Kranj	68–59	Montana 2003
Scoring by quarter: 18:12, 24:19, 13:13, 13:15
Pts: Zdolšek 17; Rebs: Seničar 12; Asts: Seničar 4		Pts: Dimitrova 14; Rebs: Peteva, Burdgess 4 Asts: Stoycheva 5

Športna dvorana Planina, Kranj
Attendance: n / a
Referees: Muhvić, Anzulovič, Ljolje

8 March 2017
18:00

Report

Beroe	93–60	Athlete Celje
Scoring by quarter: 24:18, 24:15, 20:13, 25:14
Pts: Zackery 20; Rebs: Zhelyzakova 5 Asts: Kracholova 6		Pts: Mitrić, Stefanoski 12; Rebs: Gwashavanhu 10; Asts: Mitrić, Friškovec 3

Municipal Hall, Stara Zagora
Attendance: 100
Referees: Terzievski, Mijalkovski, Jakova
