= 2017–18 WABA League League 8 =

Adriatic League basketball results

League 8 of the Adriatic League, or Superleague, took place between 10 January 2018 and it will end on 15 March 2018.

The four best ranked teams advanced to the Final Four. The points against teams from the same preliminary round were taken over.

== Standings ==
Place	Team	Pld	W	L	PF	PA	Diff	Pts	
1.	(Slovenia) Cinkarna Celje	14	11	3	1064	881	+183	28	Final Four
2.	(Montenegro) Budućnost Bemax	14	10	4	986	800	+186	24	Final Four
3.	(Bulgaria) Montana 2003	14	9	5	1055	948	+107	23	Final Four
4.	(Serbia) Crvena zvezda	14	8	6	994	941	+53	22	Final Four
5.	(Serbia) Partizan 1953	14	6	8	911	992	-81	20	
6.	(Bulgaria) Beroe	14	4	10	878	973	-95	18	
7.	(Croatia) Medveščak	14	5	9	805	909	-104	18	
8.	(Croatia) Trešnjevka 2009	14	3	11	804	1053	-198	17	

== Fixtures and results ==
All times given below are in Central European Time (for the matches played in Bulgaria is time expressed in Eastern European Time).

=== Game 1 ===
11 January 2018
19:00

Report

Budućnost Bemax	77–59	Medveščak
Scoring by quarter: 16:18, 23:17, 17:13, 21:11
Pts: Orozović, Mujović 17; Rebs: Mujović 7 Asts: Mujović 8		Pts: Borović 19; Rebs: Todorić 10; Asts: Tadić, Borović 2

University Sports&Culture Hall, Podgorica
Attendance: 400
Referees: Radanović, Kovačević, Komar

10 January 2018
17:30

Report

Crvena zvezda	71–73	Montana 2003
Scoring by quarter: 26:16, 15:14, 10:21, 20:22
Pts: Đorđević 26; Rebs: Đorđević 7 Asts: A. Katanić 6		Pts: Dimitrova 15; Rebs: Boothe 8 Asts: Stoycheva 5

Železnik Hall, Belgrade
Attendance: 100
Referees: Mikulić, Hartman, Barišić

10 January 2018
18:30

Report

Trešnjevka 2009	76–63	Partizan 1953
Scoring by quarter: 19:17, 19:18, 19:16, 19:12
Pts: Erjavec 19; Rebs: Zadro 6 Asts: Katavić, Mühl 6		Pts: Matić 17; Rebs: Janković 7 Asts: Stepanović 4

Sports Hall Peščenica, Zagreb
Attendance: 100
Referees: Srdić, Vuruna, Vavan

10 January 2018
18:00

Report

Beroe	60–67	Cinkarna Celje
Scoring by quarter: 19:22, 15:6, 10:16, 16:23
Pts: Banks 14; Rebs: Banks 13; Asts: Wright 3		Pts: Slonjšak 17; Rebs: Marić 12; Asts: N. Delić 4

Municipal Hall, Stara Zagora
Attendance: 100
Referees: Vesković, Miloradović, Milojević

=== Game 2 ===
18 January 2018
16:30

Report

Partizan 1953	67–65	Beroe
Scoring by quarter: 16:24, 13:11, 23:15, 15:15
Pts: Claussen 17; Rebs: Stepanović 12; Asts: Claussen 6		Pts: Reynolds 17; Rebs: Reynolds 12; Asts: Reynolds 5

Vizura Sport, Belgrade
Attendance: 150
Referees: Katić, Pencinger, Knez

17 January 2018
16:30

Report

Montana 2003	82–51	Trešnjevka 2009
Scoring by quarter: 25:13, 12:13, 27:13, 18:12
Pts: Boothe 19; Rebs: Makarieva 16; Asts: Živadinović 9		Pts: Erjavec 21; Rebs: Erjavec, Zadro 7 Asts: Erjavec 4

Mladost Hall, Montana
Attendance: 100
Referees: Panov, Zafirovski, Filipovski

17 February 2018
18:30

Report

Medveščak	72–58	Crvena zvezda
Scoring by quarter: 25:14, 19:18, 10:15, 18:11
Pts: Borović 28; Rebs: Todoric 16; Asts: Tadić 9		Pts: Đorđević 15; Rebs: Stjepanović 9 Asts: Stjepanović, A. Katanić 5

Sports Hall Peščenica, Zagreb
Attendance: 100
Referees: Skenderija, Sobot, Babić

17 January 2018
19:00

Report

Cinkarna Celje	59–51	Budućnost Bemax
Scoring by quarter: 13:16, 19:16, 13:14, 14:5
Pts: Slonjšak 20; Rebs: Slonjšak 11; Asts: N. Delić 4		Pts: Mitrašinović 10; Rebs: Malone 9 Asts: Mitrašinović 4

Hall Gimnazija Center Celje, Celje
Attendance: 300
Referees: Adamović, Srdić, Vujinić

=== Game 3 ===
24 January 2018
18:30

Report

Trešnjevka 2009	40–61	Medveščak
Scoring by quarter: 10:24, 10:12, 9:21, 11:4
Pts: Erjavec 11; Rebs: Kostić 6 Asts: Pavić 3		Pts: Borović 22; Rebs: Todorić 10; Asts: Todorić 7

Sports Hall Peščenica, Zagreb
Attendance: 150
Referees: Jurković, Anzulović, Antolić

25 January 2018
19:00

Report

Budućnost Bemax	77–49	Partizan 1953
Scoring by quarter: 12:14, 23:14, 16:11, 26:10
Pts: Orozović 15; Rebs: Malone 12; Asts: Topuzović 4		Pts: Claussen 15; Rebs: Janković 7 Asts: Matić 2

University Sports&Culture Hall, Podgorica
Attendance: 600
Referees: Živaljić, Jurjević, Čanković

24 January 2018
17:30

Report

Crvena zvezda	79–71	Cinkarna Celje
Scoring by quarter: 13:12, 23:22, 16:12, 27:25
Pts: A. Katanić 16; Rebs: Đorđević 14; Asts: Prlja 7		Pts: N. Delić, Chidom 14; Rebs: Slonjšak 8 Asts: A. Delić 7

Železnik Hall, Belgrade
Attendance: 100
Referees: Tresoglavić, Mikulić, Hartman

24 January 2018
18:00

Report

Beroe	76–70	Montana 2003
Scoring by quarter: 23:22, 18:12, 21:18, 14:18
Pts: Reynolds 20; Rebs: Banks 7 Asts: Reynolds 5		Pts: Boothe 18; Rebs: Boothe 16; Asts: Stoycheva 5

Municipal Hall, Stara Zagora
Attendance: 200
Referees: Vesković, Miloradović, Pešić

=== Game 4 ===
31 January 2018
18:30

Report

Medveščak	63–58	Beroe
Scoring by quarter: 25:23, 4:15, 16:12, 18:8
Pts: Tadić 17; Rebs: Todorić 16; Asts: Todorić 5		Pts: Banks 14; Rebs: Banks 12; Asts: Reynolds 6

Sports Hall Peščenica, Zagreb
Attendance: 50
Referees: Babić, Skenderija, Knežević

31 January 2018
19:00

Report

Cinkarna Celje	86–52	Trešnjevka 2009
Scoring by quarter: 23:4, 31:11, 12:14, 20:23
Pts: Slonjšak, Ocvirk 17; Rebs: Ocvirk 8 Asts: Friškovec 6		Pts: Katavić 16; Rebs: Katavić 6 Asts: Kostić 7

Hall Gimnazija Center Celje, Celje
Attendance: 100
Referees: Adamović, Srdić, Dojčinović

7 February 2018
15:30

Report

Partizan 1953	55–72	Crvena zvezda
Scoring by quarter: 12:18, 10:19, 18:13, 15:22
Pts: Matić 15; Rebs: Matić 10; Asts: three players 2		Pts: Prlja 17; Rebs: Bogićević 8 Asts: I. Katanić 5

Vizura Sport, Belgrade
Attendance: 200
Referees: Mikulić, Hartman, Barišić

31 January 2018
18:30

Report

Montana 2003	67–61	Budućnost Bemax
Scoring by quarter: 18:6, 20:19, 19:17, 10:19
Pts: Ivanova 14; Rebs: Boothe 13; Asts: Stoycheva 7		Pts: Topuzović 13; Rebs: Malone 10; Asts: Mujović 6

Mladost, Montana
Attendance: 600
Referees: Vesković, Miloradović, Milojević

=== Game 5 ===
21 February 2018
18:30

Report

Medveščak	50–88	Budućnost Bemax
Scoring by quarter: 9:27, 14:18, 9:15, 18:28
Pts: Todorić 16; Rebs: Todorić 7 Asts: three players 3		Pts: Babić 16; Rebs: Topuzović 11; Asts: Mujović 6

Sports Hall Peščenica, Zagreb
Attendance: 58
Referees: Adamović, Sobot, Srdić

21 February 2018
18:30

Report

Montana 2003	81–56	Crvena zvezda
Scoring by quarter: 22:18, 18:13, 16:12, 25:13
Pts: Boothe 33; Rebs: three players 4 Asts: Makarieva 6		Pts: Prlja 12; Rebs: I. Katanić, Naumčev 5 Asts: Stjepanović 3

Mladost, Montana
Attendance: 400
Referees: Terzievski, Panov, Zafirovski

21 February 2018
16:30

Report

Partizan 1953	77–46	Trešnjevka 2009
Scoring by quarter: 24:9, 21:14, 11:10, 21:13
Pts: Matić 17; Rebs: Matić 9 Asts: Cvetković, Claussen 4		Pts: Erjavec 13; Rebs: four players 5 Asts: Erjavec 4

Vizura Sport, Belgrade
Attendance: 50
Referees: Dejanović, Stojančević, Damjanović

21 February 2018
19:00

Report

Cinkarna Celje	93–63	Beroe
Scoring by quarter: 29:14, 19:21, 20:13, 25:15
Pts: Chidom 22; Rebs: Chidom 8 Asts: Slonjšak 6		Pts: Dineva 23; Rebs: Reynolds 5 Asts: three players 4

Hall Gimnazija Center Celje, Celje
Attendance: 200
Referees: Jurković, Anzulović, Juraga

=== Game 6 ===
28 February 2018
18:00

Report

Beroe	65–66	Partizan 1953
Scoring by quarter: 16:18, 14:15, 15:8, 20:25
Pts: Dineva 19; Rebs: Reynolds 7 Asts: Reynolds, Kocheva 5		Pts: Matić 26; Rebs: Matić 15; Asts: Mitrović 4

Municipal Hall, Stara Zagora
Attendance: 140
Referees: Zlatevski, Filipovski, Jakimovski

28 February 2018
16:30

Report

Trešnjevka 2009	61–93	Montana 2003
Scoring by quarter: 15:22, 15:25, 13:18, 18:28
Pts: Erjavec, Mühl 12; Rebs: three players 5 Asts: Mühl 8		Pts: Boothe 20; Rebs: Boothe 7 Asts: Peteva, Živadinović 6

Dom sportova 2, Zagreb
Attendance: 50
Referees: Srdić, Vujinić, Vuruna

28 February 2018
19:30

Report

Crvena zvezda	70–53	Medveščak
Scoring by quarter: 26:14, 12:10, 19:9, 13:20
Pts: Bogićević 17; Rebs: A. Katanić 11; Asts: A. Katanić 6		Pts: Bura 17; Rebs: Bura 9 Asts: Tadić 7

Železnik Hall, Belgrade
Attendance: 200
Referees: Skenderija, Vavan, Brestovac

1 March 2018
19:00

Report

Budućnost Bemax	59–50	Cinkarna Celje
Scoring by quarter: 12:10, 14:11, 12:17, 21:12
Pts: Topuzović 13; Rebs: three players 7 Asts: Mitrašinović, Malone 4		Pts: Chidom 19; Rebs: Chidom 10; Asts: A. Delić 2

University Sports&Culture Hall, Podgorica
Attendance: 600
Referees: Živaljić, Mjeda, Čanković

=== Game 7 ===
6 March 2018
20:00

Report

Medveščak	56–50	Trešnjevka 2009
Scoring by quarter: 15:15, 16:10, 9:15, 16:10
Pts: Todorić 15; Rebs: Bura 15; Asts: Todorić 9		Pts: Pavić 12; Rebs: Katavić, Kostić 8 Asts: Mühl 5

Sports Hall Peščenica, Zagreb
Attendance: 200
Referees: Galić, Gracin, Pavičić

8 March 2018
20:30

Report

Partizan 1953	62–81	Budućnost Bemax
Scoring by quarter: 17:16, 15:21, 12:22, 18:22
Pts: Matić 17; Rebs: Janković 7 Asts: Vučković 4		Pts: Džebo 12; Rebs: Topuzović 6 Asts: Mitrašinović, Mujović 5

Vizura Sport, Belgrade
Attendance: 200
Referees: Mikulić, Katić, Holjevac

7 March 2018
19:00

Report

Cinkarna Celje	80–63	Crvena zvezda
Scoring by quarter: 15:16, 22:14, 21:20, 22:13
Pts: Ocvirk 21; Rebs: Chidom 9 Asts: A. Delić 7		Pts: Prlja 17; Rebs: Stjepanović, Đorđević 5 Asts: Prlja 4

Hall Gimnazija Center Celje, Celje
Attendance: 150
Referees: Marunica, Galiot, Mustapić

7 March 2018
18:30

Report

Montana 2003	79–74	Beroe
Scoring by quarter: 24:23, 18:15, 17:20, 20:16
Pts: Makarieva, Peteva 16; Rebs: Dimitrova 8 Asts: Sharenkapova, Živadinović 5		Pts: G. Ivanova 21; Rebs: G. Ivanova 6 Asts: Natskina 4

Mladost, Montana
Attendance: 600
Referees: Milojević, Miloradović, Pešić

=== Game 8 ===
14 March 2018
18:00

Report

Beroe	20–0	Medveščak

Municipal Hall, Stara Zagora
Attendance: n / a
Referees: n / a

15 March 2018
17:30

Report

Trešnjevka 2009	54–105	Cinkarna Celje
Scoring by quarter: 15:22, 8:25, 19:30, 12:28
Pts: Katavić, Mühl 17; Rebs: Mühl 9 Asts: Mühl 6		Pts: Slonjšak 38; Rebs: Chidom 9 Asts: A. Delić, Slonjšak 6

Sutinska vrela, Zagreb
Attendance: 25
Referees: Adamović, Skenderija, Dojčinović

13 March 2018
19:30

Report

Crvena zvezda	78–61	Partizan 1953
Scoring by quarter: 16:14, 21:14, 16:23, 25:10
Pts: Prlja 29; Rebs: Prlja, A. Katanić 8 Asts: Prlja 6		Pts: Claussen 11; Rebs: Vidović 7 Asts: Claussen 6

Železnik Hall, Belgrade
Attendance: 200
Referees: Holjevac, Pencinger, Grubišić

14 March 2018
18:00

Report

Budućnost Bemax	76–63	Montana 2003
Scoring by quarter: 24:16, 9:21, 20:17, 23:9
Pts: Mujović, Malone 22; Rebs: Malone 11; Asts: Mujović 8		Pts: Boothe 18; Rebs: Boothe 6 Asts: Sharenkapova 6

University Sports&Culture Hall, Podgorica
Attendance: 400
Referees: Kralj, Radanović, Komar
