= 2016–17 WABA League Group A =

Group A of the WABA League took place between 5 October 2016 and it will end on 11 January 2017.

The four best ranked teams advanced to the League 8.

Team Play Off Sarajevo at the beginning of 2017 changed the general sponsor, and is the first part of the season appeared well Play Off Happy, and the other as Play Off Ultra.

== Standings ==
Place	Team	Pld	W	L	PF	PA	Diff	Pts	
1.	(Bulgaria) Beroe	8	7	1	617	479	+138	15	League 8
2.	(Slovenia) Triglav Kranj	8	5	3	471	476	-5	13	League 8
3.	(Bosnia and Herzegovina) Play Off Ultra	8	4	4	545	556	-11	12	League 8
4.	(Serbia) Partizan 1953	8	3	5	560	576	-16	11	League 8
5.	(Serbia) Kraljevo	8	1	7	496	602	-106	9	

== Fixtures and results ==
All times given below are in Central European Time (for the match played in Bulgaria is time expressed in Eastern European Time).

=== Game 1 ===
5 October 2016
18:00

Report

Kraljevo	54–57	Triglav Kranj
Scoring by quarter: 9:14, 14:17, 24:15, 7:11
Pts: Katić 17; Rebs: Janković 6 Asts: Bajić 4		Pts: Jevtović 16; Rebs: Zdolšek, Seničar 9 Asts: three players 3

Kraljevo Sports Hall, Kraljevo
Attendance: n / a
Referees: Savović, Radinović, Orbović

5 October 2016
19:00

Report

Partizan 1953	63–82	Beroe
Scoring by quarter: 25:21, 7:21, 19:24, 12:16
Pts: Milovanović 17; Rebs: Živadinović 8 Asts: Živadinović 4		Pts: Reid 23; Rebs: Zackery 8 Asts: Zackery 5

Sports Hall "Ranko Žeravica", Belgrade
Attendance: 150
Referees: Holjevac, Katić, Grubišić

=== Game 2 ===
27 October 2016
19:00

Report

Triglav Kranj	72–71	Partizan 1953
Scoring by quarter: 15:17, 20:18, 18:18, 19:18
Pts: Jevtović 16; Rebs: Jevtović 7 Asts: Žibert, Jakobčič 4		Pts: Matić 24; Rebs: Špikić, Milovanović 9 Asts: Ćulafić 9

Športna dvorana Planina, Kranj
Attendance: 200
Referees: Terlević, Stanković, Šverko

11 January 2017
20:45

Report

Play Off Ultra	88–71	Kraljevo
Scoring by quarter: 20:14, 22:15, 27:26, 19:16
Pts: Marković, A. Delić 23; Rebs: N. Delić 11; Asts: N. Delić 5		Pts: Radić 18; Rebs: Bajić 6 Asts: Bajić 4

Ramiz Salčin Hall, Sarajevo
Attendance: n / a
Referees: Katić, Holjevac, Grubišić

=== Game 3 ===
20 October 2016
17:00

Report

Partizan 1953	75–93	Play Off Happy
Scoring by quarter: 23:10, 14:33, 22:36, 16:14
Pts: Petrović, Matić 15; Rebs: Živadinović 10; Asts: Živadinović 7		Pts: Milošev 32; Rebs: Milošev, Marković 2 Asts: A. Delić 9

Sports Hall "Ranko Žeravica", Belgrade
Attendance: 100
Referees: Tresoglavić, Holjevac, Mikulić

19 October 2016
19:00

Report

Beroe	70–57	Triglav Kranj
Scoring by quarter: 25:14, 14:18, 16:10, 15:15
Pts: Reid 19; Rebs: Reid 16; Asts: Reid 4		Pts: Abramovič 17; Rebs: Zdolšek 8 Asts: Abramovič 3

Municipal Hall, Stara Zagora
Attendance: 250
Referees: Cvetanoski, Mijalkovski, Terzievski

=== Game 4 ===
27 October 2016
19:00

Report

Play Off Happy	52–58	Beroe
Scoring by quarter: 14:17, 15:11, 18:20, 5:10
Pts: A. Delić 18; Rebs: Marković 8 Asts: Ćorda 4		Pts: Reid 16; Rebs: Reid 15; Asts: Perkins, Reid 3

Skenderija, Sarajevo
Attendance: 200
Referees: Jevtović, Ninković, Virijević

17 November 2016
19:30

Report

Kraljevo	67–77	Partizan 1953
Scoring by quarter: 14:27, 14:22, 19:15, 20:13
Pts: Bajić 26; Rebs: Ahoefa, Radić 6 Asts: Bajić 4		Pts: Matić 20; Rebs: Milovanović 14; Asts: Živadinović 6

Kraljevo Sports Hall, Kraljevo
Attendance: n / a
Referees: Juras, Pecelj, Sedlar

=== Game 5 ===
2 November 2016
19:00

Report

Beroe	90–47	Kraljevo
Scoring by quarter: 29:10, 24:15, 21:15, 16:7
Pts: Reid 23; Rebs: Reid, Zackery 8 Asts: Zhelyzakova 5		Pts: Katić 16; Rebs: Janković 6 Asts: Rajić, Šerić 2

Municipal Hall, Stara Zagora
Attendance: 100
Referees: Lazov, Mihajlović, Zlatevski

3 November 2016
19:00

Report

Triglav Kranj	41–46	Play Off Happy
Scoring by quarter: 5:14, 19:9, 9:16, 8:7
Pts: Abramovič, Jevtović 9 Rebs: Jakobčič 7 Asts: Jelenc 5		Pts: Džebo 14; Rebs: N. Delić, Marković 9 Asts: N. Delić, A. Delić 4

Športna dvorana Planina, Kranj
Attendance: 100
Referees: Galiot, Jurković, Marunica

=== Game 6 ===
10 November 2016
19:00

Report

Triglav Kranj	68–53	Kraljevo
Scoring by quarter: 14:11, 22:13, 18:15, 14:14
Pts: Abramovič 23; Rebs: Zdolšek 10; Asts: Žibert, Seničar 5		Pts: Šerić, Katić 10; Rebs: Mihailović 7 Asts: Mihailović 5

Športna dvorana Planina, Kranj
Attendance: 80
Referees: Prpić, Mustapić, Prohaska

9 November 2016
19:00

Report

Beroe	81–63	Partizan 1953
Scoring by quarter: 26:8, 20:22, 17:15, 18:18
Pts: Reid 24; Rebs: Reid 12; Asts: Kostova 7		Pts: Milovanović 19; Rebs: Milovanović, Matić 7 Asts: Petrović 6

Municipal Hall, Stara Zagora
Attendance: 150
Referees: Micevski, Antovski, Petrović

=== Game 7 ===
30 November 2016
19:00

Report

Partizan 1953	73–45	Triglav Kranj
Scoring by quarter: 13:9, 17:7, 18:16, 25:13
Pts: Živadinović 18; Rebs: Matić 13; Asts: Živadinović, Milovanović 5		Pts: Jevtović 12; Rebs: Seničar 6 Asts: four players 2

Sports Hall "Ranko Žeravica", Belgrade
Attendance: 100
Referees: Pencinger, Holjevac, Grubišić

30 November 2016
19:30

Report

Kraljevo	78–72	Play Off Happy
Scoring by quarter: 19:19, 23:12, 15:17, 21:24
Pts: Šerić 18; Rebs: Radić 9 Asts: Bajić 8		Pts: Milošev 18; Rebs: N. Delić 8 Asts: Ćorda 4

Kraljevo Sports Hall, Kraljevo
Attendance: n / a
Referees: Popović, Šutulović, Orbović

=== Game 8 ===
8 December 2016
19:30

Report

Play Off Happy	76–66	Partizan 1953
Scoring by quarter: 22:16, 11:18, 20:11, 23:21
Pts: A. Delić 20; Rebs: Marković 8 Asts: A. Delić 8		Pts: Milovanović, Matić 16; Rebs: Matić 12; Asts: three players 3

Skenderija, Sarajevo
Attendance: n / a
Referees: Prpić, Galiot, Gracin

8 December 2016
19:00

Report

Triglav Kranj	64–57	Beroe
Scoring by quarter: 18:17, 17:19, 21:10, 8:11
Pts: Abramovič 20; Rebs: Sofrič, Kalušić 7 Asts: Meden 6		Pts: Reid 20; Rebs: Reid 11; Asts: Perkins 6

Športna dvorana Planina, Kranj
Attendance: 100
Referees: Stanković, Lenac, Šverko

=== Game 9 ===
15 December 2016
18:00

Report

Beroe	100–67	Play Off Happy
Scoring by quarter: 27:12, 19:13, 24:22, 30:20
Pts: Reid 41; Rebs: Perkins, Reid 11; Asts: Kostova, Perkins 5		Pts: Marković 16; Rebs: A. Delić 7 Asts: A. Delić 5

Municipal Hall, Stara Zagora
Attendance: 150
Referees: Mijalkovski, Terzievski, Lazov

22 November 2016
20:00

Report

Partizan 1953	72–60	Kraljevo
Scoring by quarter: 18:5, 26:20, 19:19, 9:16
Pts: Matić 22; Rebs: Milovanović 12; Asts: Živadinović 7		Pts: Bajić 18; Rebs: Radić 8 Asts: Šerić 5

Sports Hall "Ranko Žeravica", Belgrade
Attendance: 250
Referees: Pecelj, Sedlar, Jovičin

=== Game 10 ===
19 December 2016
17:00

Report

Kraljevo	66–79	Beroe
Scoring by quarter: 14:24, 16:25, 21:14, 15:16
Pts: Radić 15; Rebs: Šerić 7 Asts: Bajić 5		Pts: Reid 20; Rebs: Perkins 7 Asts: Reid 8

Kraljevo Sports Hall, Kraljevo
Attendance: n / a
Referees: Savović, Vujičić, Radinović

23 December 2016
15:30

Report

Play Off Happy	52–67	Triglav Kranj
Scoring by quarter: 13:19, 7:19, 15:13, 17:16
Pts: N. Delić 17; Rebs: Marković 9 Asts: Ćorda, N. Delić 4		Pts: Kalušić 26; Rebs: Zdolšek 12; Asts: five players 3

Skenderija, Sarajevo
Attendance: n / a
Referees: Savović, Orbović, Lakićević
