= 2017–18 WABA League Group B =

Group B of the Adriatic League took place between 4 October 2017 and it will end on 20 December 2017.

The four best ranked teams advanced to the League 8.

== Standings ==
Place	Team	Pld	W	L	PF	PA	Diff	Pts	
1.	(Slovenia) Cinkarna Celje	10	9	1	827	598	+229	19	League 8
2.	(Serbia) Partizan 1953	10	7	3	705	668	+37	17	League 8
3.	(Bulgaria) Montana 2003	10	7	3	788	672	+116	17	League 8
4.	(Croatia) Medveščak	10	4	6	655	641	+14	14	League 8
5.	(Serbia) Kraljevo	10	2	8	571	734	-163	12	
6.	(Croatia) Ragusa Dubrovnik	10	1	9	553	786	-233	11	

== Fixtures and results ==
All times given below are in Central European Time (for the matches played in Bulgaria is time expressed in Eastern European Time).

=== Game 1 ===
4 October 2017
19:00

Report

Cinkarna Celje	99–41	Ragusa Dubrovnik
Scoring by quarter: 32:7, 26:15, 15:6, 26:13
Pts: Slonjšak 16; Rebs: Marić 15; Asts: A. Delić 6		Pts: Zovko 13; Rebs: Zovko, Matijević 6 Asts: Zovko 4

Dvorana Gimnazije Celje – Center, Celje
Attendance: 200
Referees: Adamović, Vujnić, Dojčinović

4 October 2017
19:00

Report

Partizan 1953	65–61	Medveščak
Scoring by quarter: 19:21, 14:11, 13:15, 19:14
Pts: Matić 17; Rebs: Vidović 11; Asts: Bojović 7		Pts: Borović 16; Rebs: Bura 8 Asts: Petrak 6

Ranko Žeravica Sports Hall, Belgrade
Attendance: 2500
Referees: Skenderija, Vavan, Stojančević

4 October 2017
18:30

Report

Montana 2003	82–61	Kraljevo
Scoring by quarter: 21:13, 27:18, 15:19, 19:11
Pts: Sharenkapova 16; Rebs: Dimitrova 8 Asts: Sharenkapova 6		Pts: Živanović 12; Rebs: Trišović 9 Asts: Katić 5

Sports Hall Mladost, Montana
Attendance: 600
Referees: Lalkov, Petrović, Panov

=== Game 2 ===
11 October 2017
19:30

Report

Kraljevo	60–57	Medveščak
Scoring by quarter: 14:20, 14:12, 16:8, 16:17
Pts: Šerić 15; Rebs: Ali BraShey 11; Asts: Šerić 6		Pts: Vojtulek 16; Rebs: Vojtulek, Todorić 8 Asts: Tadić, Todorić 3

Kraljevo Sports Hall, Kraljevo
Attendance: n/a
Referees: Savović, Radinović, Orbović

11 October 2017
18:00

Report

Ragusa Dubrovnik	61–65	Partizan 1953
Scoring by quarter: 19:16, 12:19, 19:14, 11:16
Pts: Stojanović 21; Rebs: Stojanović, Zovko 7 Asts: Stojanović, Kalajdžić 3		Pts: Matić 20; Rebs: Matić 11; Asts: Bojović 5

Gospino polje, Dubrovnik
Attendance: n/a
Referees: Radanović, Komar, Kovačević

11 October 2017
18:30

Report

Montana 2003	82–78	Cinkarna Celje
Scoring by quarter: 15:22, 24:16, 23:18, 20:22
Pts: Boothe, Ivanova 18; Rebs: Boothe 7 Asts: Živadinović 5		Pts: N. Delić 20; Rebs: Slonjšak 9 Asts: Slonjšak 5

Mladost, Montana
Attendance: 600
Referees: Matić, Miloradović, Pešić

=== Game 3 ===
18 October 2017
19:00

Report

Cinkarna Celje	101–47	Kraljevo
Scoring by quarter: 26:11, 28:11, 26:12, 21:13
Pts: Slonjšak 21; Rebs: Chidom 13; Asts: N. Delić 9		Pts: Bajić 10; Rebs: Šerić 6 Asts: Bajić 6

Gimnazija Center Celje, Celje
Attendance: 150
Referees: Jurković, Reić, Glavurdić

19 October 2017
17:00

Report

Partizan 1953	77–74	Montana 2003
Scoring by quarter: 12:21, 20:15, 22:21, 23:17
Pts: Bojović 26; Rebs: Bojović 9 Asts: Bojović 7		Pts: Makarieva 20; Rebs: Boothe 11; Asts: Peteva 6

Vizura Sport, Belgrade
Attendance: 100
Referees: Adamović, Srdić, Vujinić

15 October 2017
16:00

Report

Medveščak	68–47	Ragusa Dubrovnik
Scoring by quarter: 12:10, 26:9, 25:9, 5:1
Pts: Borović 15; Rebs: Petrak, Todorić 7 Asts: Radoš 5		Pts: Zovko 10; Rebs: Zovko 6 Asts: Stanković 4

Peščenica, Zagreb
Attendance: n/a
Referees: Pavičić, Vukojević, Glavurdić

=== Game 4 ===
24 October 2017
19:30

Report

Kraljevo	66–44	Ragusa Dubrovnik
Scoring by quarter: 17:12, 22:9, 8:10, 19:13
Pts: Nikolić 17; Rebs: Ali BraShey 17; Asts: Bajić 6		Pts: Zovko 15; Rebs: Erslan 12; Asts: Kalajdžić 5

Kraljevo Sports Hall, Kraljevo
Attendance: 150
Referees: Popović, Vujičić, Radinović

25 October 2017
18:30

Report

Montana 2003	82–68	Medveščak
Scoring by quarter: 25:16, 20:23, 18:12, 19:17
Pts: Stoycheva 19; Rebs: Boothe 13; Asts: Stoycheva 6		Pts: Tadić 14; Rebs: Todorić 13; Asts: Todorić 5

Mladost hall, Montana
Attendance: 300
Referees: Milojević, Matić, Krstić

25 October 2017
19:00

Report

Cinkarna Celje	68–62	Partizan 1953
Scoring by quarter: 21:22, 13:13, 16:17, 18:10
Pts: Slonjšak 15; Rebs: Chidom 10; Asts: A. Delić 5		Pts: Matić 20; Rebs: Matić 16; Asts: Bojović 8

Hall Gimnazija Center Celje, Celje
Attendance: 200
Referees: Palavra, Reić, Glavurdić

=== Game 5 ===
1 November 2017
16:00

Report

Partizan 1953	69–58	Kraljevo
Scoring by quarter: 14:19, 15:10, 17:8, 23:21
Pts: Matić 21; Rebs: Matić 11; Asts: Bojović 8		Pts: Šerić 14; Rebs: Rajić 7 Asts: Šerić 7

Vizura Sport, Belgrade
Attendance: 200
Referees: Pecelj, Sedlar, Jovičin

31 October 2017
20:00

Report

Medveščak	59–86	Cinkarna Celje
Scoring by quarter: 17:19, 18:18, 14:27, 10:22
Pts: Borović 16; Rebs: Bura 9 Asts: Bura 3		Pts: Ocvirk 21; Rebs: Marić, Chidom 9 Asts: Friškovec 5

Peščenica, Zagreb
Attendance: n/a
Referees: Adamović, Skenderija, Knežević

31 October 2017
17:45

Report

Ragusa Dubrovnik	60–84	Montana 2003
Scoring by quarter: 5:27, 20:21, 13:19, 22:17
Pts: Zarač 18; Rebs: Tomičić 10; Asts: Haklička 6		Pts: Boothe 16; Rebs: Dimitrova 6 Asts: Sharenkapova 5

Gospino polje, Dubrovnik
Attendance: n/a
Referees: Radulović, Radinović, Orbović

=== Game 6 ===
22 November 2017
17:30

Report

Ragusa Dubrovnik	57–90	Cinkarna Celje
Scoring by quarter: 13:28, 19:22, 11:18, 14:22
Pts: Zovko 15; Rebs: Stanković 8 Asts: Tomičić, Matijević 4		Pts: Slonjšak 29; Rebs: Slonjšak 8 Asts: A. Delić 6

Gospino polje, Dubrovnik
Attendance: 100
Referees: Radinović, Vujičić, Orbović

22 November 2017
18:30

Report

Medveščak	82–65	Partizan 1953
Scoring by quarter: 12:17, 28:10, 17:21, 25:17
Pts: Bura 20; Rebs: Bura 12; Asts: Todorić 5		Pts: Matić 22; Rebs: Matić 11; Asts: Bojović 11

Sports Hall Pescenica, Zagreb
Attendance: 100
Referees: Babić, Srdić, Vavan

22 November 2017
16:30

Report

Kraljevo	55–79	Montana 2003
Scoring by quarter: 11:29, 16:15, 6:19, 22:16
Pts: Ahoefa 16; Rebs: Ahoefa 10; Asts: Rajić 2		Pts: Ivanova 27; Rebs: Boothe 10; Asts: Živadinović 7

Kraljevo Sports Hall, Kraljevo
Attendance: 50
Referees: Radulović, Radinović, Pejović

=== Game 7 ===
29 November 2017
18:30

Report

Medveščak	59–43	Kraljevo
Scoring by quarter: 23:9, 5:8, 19:9, 12:17
Pts: Borović 21; Rebs: Bura 13; Asts: Tadić 7		Pts: Ali BraShey 9 Rebs: Ahoefa 12; Asts: Šerić 3

Sports Hall Pescenica, Zagreb
Attendance: 100
Referees: Skenderija, Vuruna, Vavan

30 November 2017
17:00

Report

Partizan 1953	71–56	Ragusa Dubrovnik
Scoring by quarter: 30:11, 14:12, 12:17, 15:16
Pts: Mitrović 19; Rebs: Matić 8 Asts: three players 4		Pts: Stojanović 17; Rebs: Matijević, Zovko 8 Asts: Kalajdžić 4

Vizura Sport, Belgrade
Attendance: 50
Referees: Dejanović, Stojančević, Damjanović

29 November 2017
19:00

Report

Cinkarna Celje	68–65	Montana 2003
Scoring by quarter: 14:25, 24:12, 12:8, 18:20
Pts: Marić 15; Rebs: A. Delić 9 Asts: Mitrić 6		Pts: Boothe, Ivanova 14; Rebs: Boothe 12; Asts: Sharenkapova, Peteva 4

Hall Gimnazija Center Celje, Celje
Attendance: 200
Referees: Kovačević, Štrok, Kumrić

=== Game 8 ===
6 December 2017
19:30

Report

Kraljevo	53–84	Cinkarna Celje
Scoring by quarter: 7:27, 12:20, 21:14, 13:23
Pts: Bajić 12; Rebs: Nikolić 8 Asts: Bajić 5		Pts: Slonjšak 24; Rebs: Chidom 10; Asts: A. Delić 5

Kraljevo Sports Hall, Kraljevo
Attendance: 50
Referees: Lakićević, Vujičić, Pejović

6 December 2017
18:30

Report

Montana 2003	71–77	Partizan 1953
Scoring by quarter: 15:21, 14:14, 18:18, 24:24
Pts: Boothe 19; Rebs: Boothe 10; Asts: Peteva 5		Pts: Bojović 32; Rebs: Matić 9 Asts: Bojović 6

Mladost, Montana
Attendance: 300
Referees: Mijalkovski, Davidov, Jakimovski

6 December 2017
17:30

Report

Ragusa Dubrovnik	43–80	Medveščak
Scoring by quarter: 19:28, 7:20, 7:11, 10:21
Pts: Zovko 17; Rebs: Zovko 8 Asts: Zovko 3		Pts: Borović 20; Rebs: Vojtulek 10; Asts: Tadić 7

Gospino polje, Dubrovnik
Attendance: 52
Referees: Radanović, Komar, Kovačević

=== Game 9 ===
13 December 2017
17:30

Report

Ragusa Dubrovnik	70–67	Kraljevo
Scoring by quarter: 24:8, 20:22, 17:17, 9:20
Pts: Zovko 23; Rebs: Zovko 13; Asts: Kalajdžić 7		Pts: Rajić 18; Rebs: Ali BraShey 8 Asts: Bajić 4

Gospino polje, Dubrovnik
Attendance: 69
Referees: Radinović, Radinović, Orbović

14 December 2017
20:00

Report

Medveščak	54–73	Montana 2003
Scoring by quarter: 9:21, 20:16, 19:23, 6:13
Pts: Bura 14; Rebs: Vojtulek 13; Asts: Tadić 5		Pts: Ivanova 19; Rebs: Boothe 11; Asts: Stoycheva 7

Sports Hall Pescenica, Zagreb
Attendance: 100
Referees: Babić, Knežević, Srdić

13 December 2017
17:30

Report

Partizan 1953	65–76	Cinkarna Celje
Scoring by quarter: 17:17, 18:21, 17:21, 13:17
Pts: Matić 17; Rebs: Stepanović 8 Asts: Bojović 5		Pts: Chidom 28; Rebs: Chidom 8 Asts: Chidom 4

Vizura Soirt, Belgrade
Attendance: 150
Referees: Adamović, Skenderija, Vujinić

=== Game 10 ===
18 December 2017
16:30

Report

Kraljevo	61–89	Partizan 1953
Scoring by quarter: 18:23, 12:21, 19:26, 12:19
Pts: Stefanović, Katić 13; Rebs: Stefanović 8 Asts: Šerić 3		Pts: Bojović, Matić 23; Rebs: Janković 14; Asts: Bojović, Vidović 6

Kraljevo Sports Hall, Kraljevo
Attendance: 50
Referees: Matić, Milojević, Pešić

20 December 2017
19:00

Report

Cinkarna Celje	77–67	Medveščak
Scoring by quarter: 27:9, 26:14, 10:21, 14:23
Pts: Ocvirk 16; Rebs: Ocvirk 11; Asts: N. Delić, Friškovec 5		Pts: Bura 20; Rebs: Bura 11; Asts: Tadić 9

Hall Gimnazija Center Celje, Celje
Attendance: 300
Referees: Adamović, Srdić, Vavan

19 December 2017
18:30

Report

Montana 2003	96–74	Ragusa Dubrovnik
Scoring by quarter: 37:20, 29:20, 12:17, 18:17
Pts: Sharenkapova 12; Rebs: Simeonova 8 Asts: Živadinović 6		Pts: Zovko 23; Rebs: Tomičić, Zovko 6 Asts: Haklička 5

Mladost, Montana
Attendance: 300
Referees: Panov, Zafirovski, Filipovski
