= 2016–17 WABA League Group B =

Group B of the WABA League took place between 5 October 2016 and it will end on 29 December 2016.

The four best ranked teams advanced to the League 8.

== Standings ==
Place	Team	Pld	W	L	PF	PA	Diff	Pts	
1.	(Montenegro) Budućnost Bemax	8	6	2	631	510	+121	14	League 8
2.	(Bulgaria) Montana 2003	8	6	2	574	527	+47	14	League 8
3.	(Slovenia) Athlete Celje	8	6	2	652	547	+105	13	League 8
4.	(Serbia) Crvena zvezda	8	2	6	543	562	-19	10	League 8
5.	(North Macedonia) Badel 1862	8	0	8	396	650	-254	8	

== Fixtures and results ==
All times given below are in Central European Time (for the match played in Bulgaria is time expressed in Eastern European Time).

=== Game 1 ===
5 October 2016
17:00

Report

Montana 2003	77–71	Athlete Celje
Scoring by quarter: 19:26, 21:19, 20:8, 17:18
Pts: Sharenkapova 19; Rebs: three players 6 Asts: Stoycheva 9		Pts: Evans 20; Rebs: Evans 13; Asts: Potočnik 3

Sports Hall Mladost, Montana
Attendance: 500
Referees: Jevtović, Ninković, Arsenijević

6 October 2016
19:00

Report

Budućnost Bemax	76–61	Crvena zvezda
Scoring by quarter: 27:13, 17:19, 20:9, 12:20
Pts: Matović 19; Rebs: Matović 10; Asts: Topuzović 5		Pts: Prlja, Bojović 11; Rebs: Đorđević 8 Asts: I. Katanić 6

University Sports & Culture Hall, Podgorica
Attendance: n / a
Referees: Živaljić, Mjeda, Bajramović

=== Game 2 ===
7 October 2016
19:30

Report

Badel 1862	51–88	Athlete Celje
Scoring by quarter: 11:25, 17:19, 11:24, 12:20
Pts: Mathieu 17; Rebs: three players 5 Asts: Mathieu 3		Pts: Prezelj 36; Rebs: Evans 14; Asts: Ocvirk 3

Nezavisna Makedonija, Skopje
Attendance: 100
Referees: Popović, Radinović, Vujičić

2 November 2016
19:00

Report

Crvena zvezda	66–69	Montana 2003
Scoring by quarter: 13:17, 19:15, 24:15, 10:22
Pts: A. Katanić 18; Rebs: Đorđević 8 Asts: Prlja, Bojović 3		Pts: Allen 23; Rebs: Burdgess 12; Asts: four players 3

Basket City Hall, Belgrade
Attendance: 200
Referees: Tresoglavić, Holjevac, Mikulić

=== Game 3 ===
20 October 2016
19:00

Report

Budućnost Bemax	71–40	Badel 1862
Scoring by quarter: 22:10, 18:12, 19:4, 12:14
Pts: Matović 15; Rebs: Stjepanović 8 Asts: Mujović 5		Pts: Trajcevska 12; Rebs: Mathieu 12; Asts: Leskaroska 3

University Sports & Culture Hall, Podgorica
Attendance: 650
Referees: Roglić, Živaljić, Bokić

19 October 2016
18:00

Report

Athlete Celje	88–63	Crvena zvezda
Scoring by quarter: 25:12, 21:18, 22:15, 20:18
Pts: Prezelj 19; Rebs: Evans 9 Asts: Prezelj 5		Pts: Bogićević, Bojović 11; Rebs: Bojović 10; Asts: four players 2

Dvorana Gimnazije Celje – Center, Celje
Attendance: 200
Referees: Tomić, Jurković, Glavurdić

=== Game 4 ===
26 October 2016
19:00

Report

Badel 1862	46–70	Crvena zvezda
Scoring by quarter: 17:21, 12:15, 13:19, 4:15
Pts: Trajcevska 12; Rebs: Mathieu 16; Asts: Mathieu 5		Pts: Bogićević 19; Rebs: three players 7 Asts: four players 2

Nezavisna Makedonija, Skopje
Attendance: 100
Referees: Savović, Šutulović, Pantović

27 October 2016
19:00

Report

Budućnost Bemax	67–46	Montana 2003
Scoring by quarter: 16:12, 18:8, 22:14, 11:12
Pts: Kapor 17; Rebs: Topuzović 14; Asts: Matović 6		Pts: Stoycheva 12; Rebs: Burdgess 9 Asts: Allen 3

University Sports&Culture Hall, Podgorica
Attendance: 450
Referees: Boškoski, Davidov, Stojcevski

=== Game 5 ===
12 October 2016
18:30

Report

Montana 2003	81–55	Badel 1862
Scoring by quarter: 22:16, 24:15, 19:10, 16:14
Pts: Burdgess 18; Rebs: Makarieva, Sharenkapova 7 Asts: Allen, Makarieva 5		Pts: Trajcevska 14; Rebs: Mathieu 12; Asts: Leskaroska 5

Sports Hall Mladost, Montana
Attendance: 500
Referees: Vesković, Prpa, Virijević

2 November 2016
18:00

Report

Athlete Celje	83–79 (OT)	Budućnost Bemax
Scoring by quarter: 17:13, 12:17, 21:13, 10:17, Overtime: 23:19
Pts: Prezelj 23; Rebs: Ocvirk 8 Asts: Mitrić 6		Pts: Mujović 22; Rebs: Topuzović, Stjepanović 12; Asts: Babić 4

Dvorana Gimnazije Celje – Center, Celje
Attendance: 200
Referees: Prpić, Mustapić, Reić

=== Game 6 ===
10 November 2016
18:00

Report

Crvena zvezda	74–81	Budućnost Bemax
Scoring by quarter: 21:22, 16:22, 23:19, 14:18
Pts: Bogićević 27; Rebs: Đorđević 10; Asts: A. Katanić 5		Pts: Mujović 23; Rebs: Stjepanović 12; Asts: Mujović 8

Basket City Hall, Belgrade
Attendance: 65
Referees: Tresoglavić, Katić, Knez

9 November 2016
18:00

Report

Athlete Celje	68–64	Montana 2003
Scoring by quarter: 18:22, 12:12, 22:11, 16:19
Pts: Evans 24; Rebs: Slonjšak 10; Asts: Potočnik 6		Pts: Dimitrova 17; Rebs: Allen 9 Asts: Allen 8

Dvorana Gimnazije Celje – Center, Celje
Attendance: 100
Referees: Galiot, Marunica, Reić

=== Game 7 ===
30 November 2016
18:00

Report

Athlete Celje	104–50	Badel 1862
Scoring by quarter: 30:16, 18:12, 28:14, 28:8
Pts: Prezelj 31; Rebs: Molnar 9 Asts: Slonjšak 6		Pts: Trajcevska 17; Rebs: Trajcevska 5 Asts: Trajcevska 4

Dvorana Gimnazije Celje – Center, Celje
Attendance: 100
Referees: Prpić, Glavurdić, Ljolje

30 November 2016
18:30

Report

Montana 2003	77–54	Crvena zvezda
Scoring by quarter: 20:16, 21:14, 13:16, 23:8
Pts: Allen 16; Rebs: Burdgess 10; Asts: Stoycheva 13		Pts: Đorđević 11; Rebs: Đorđević 7 Asts: I. Katanić 5

Sports Hall Mladost, Montana
Attendance: 450
Referees: Cvetanoski, Petrović, Jakova

=== Game 8 ===
16 December 2016
19:00

Report

Badel 1862	53–76	Budućnost Bemax
Scoring by quarter: 13:20, 16:16, 11:21, 13:19
Pts: Mitrašinovik 16; Rebs: Mathieu 10; Asts: Brown 3		Pts: Matović 21; Rebs: Stjepanović 9 Asts: Babić, Mujović 3

Nezavisna Makedonija, Skopje
Attendance: 40
Referees: Mažić, Smiljanić, Vesković

8 December 2016
18:00

Report

Crvena zvezda	67–87	Athlete Celje
Scoring by quarter: 18:23, 18:21, 18:19, 13:22
Pts: Prlja 14; Rebs: A. Katanić 7 Asts: A. Katanić 6		Pts: Prezelj 29; Rebs: Evans 14; Asts: Krošelj 6

Basket City Hall, Belgrade
Attendance: 84
Referees: Tresoglavić, Mikulić, Knez

=== Game 9 ===
29 December 2016
16:00

Report

Crvena zvezda	88–40	Badel 1862
Scoring by quarter: 23:10, 25:14, 26:7, 14:9
Pts: Đorđević 17; Rebs: A. Katanić 9 Asts: Ćirić 6		Pts: Mathieu 15; Rebs: Mathieu 11; Asts: Sekuloska, Brown 3

Basket City Hall, Belgrade
Attendance: 38
Referees: Tresoglavić, Mikulić, Knez

14 December 2016
18:30

Report

Montana 2003	88–85	Budućnost Bemax
Scoring by quarter: 17:20, 25:21, 14:23, 22:14
Pts: Sharenkapova 24; Rebs: Allen 14; Asts: Allen 8		Pts: Mujović 25; Rebs: Matović 8 Asts: Mujović 10

Sports Hall Mladost, Montana
Attendance: 500
Referees: Jevtović, Prpa, Virijević

=== Game 10 ===
21 December 2016
19:00

Report

Badel 1862	61–72	Montana 2003
Scoring by quarter: 15:15, 14:26, 17:16, 15:15
Pts: Mitrašinovik 17; Rebs: Mathieu 14; Asts: Trajcevska, Pejkovska 3		Pts: Burdgess 19; Rebs: Makarieva 9 Asts: Makarieva 4

Sports Hall Vardar, Skopje
Attendance: 40
Referees: Popović, K. Radinović, I. Radinović

22 December 2016
19:00

Report

Budućnost Bemax	96–65	Athlete Celje
Scoring by quarter: 28:18, 22:19, 25:12, 21:16
Pts: Topuzović 18; Rebs: Pejović 7 Asts: Mujović, Kapor 6		Pts: Ocvirk 16; Rebs: Slonjšak 8 Asts: Marić 5

University Sports&Culture Hall, Podgorica
Attendance: 350
Referees: Roglić, Živaljić, Jurjević
