= 2017–18 WABA League Final Four =

Final Four of the Adriatic League to be played from 24–25 March 2018 in the Montana, Bulgaria.

== Semifinals ==
24 March 2018
16:15

Report

Cinkarna Celje	77–55	Crvena zvezda
Scoring by quarter: 17:11, 24:15, 19:11, 17:18
Pts: A. Delić, Slonjšak 17; Rebs: Marić 10; Asts: Chidom 5		Pts: Đorđević, Jovanović 12; Rebs: Đorđević 7 Asts: three players 2

Sports Hall Mladost, Montana
Attendance: 400
Referees: Holjevac, Tresoglavić, Pencinger

24 March 2018
19:15

Report

Budućnost Bemax	74–67	Montana 2003
Scoring by quarter: 20:10, 17:19, 22:18, 15:20
Pts: Mujović 26; Rebs: Topuzović 13; Asts: three players 2		Pts: three players 12; Rebs: Dimitrova, Boothe 6 Asts: Sharenkapova, Peteva 4

Sports Hall Mladost, Montana
Attendance: 800
Referees: Vesković, Arsenijević, Mrdak

== For third place ==
25 March 2018
16:00

Report

Crvena zvezda	69–77	Montana 2003
Scoring by quarter: 18:21, 13:28, 19:16, 19:12
Pts: Stjepanović 15; Rebs: Jovanović 6 Asts: A. Katanić 5		Pts: Boothe 16; Rebs: Boothe 11; Asts: Sharenkapova 7

Sports Hall Mladost, Montana
Attendance: 400
Referees: Holjevac, Tresoglavić, Pencinger

== Final ==
25 March 2018
19:00

Report

Cinkarna Celje	68–71	Budućnost Bemax
Scoring by quarter: 14:12, 14:22, 17:15, 23:22
Pts: A. Delić 18; Rebs: Chidom 6 Asts: Friškovec 6		Pts: Babić 16; Rebs: Topuzović 9 Asts: Mujović 7

Sports Hall Mladost, Montana
Attendance: 800
Referees: Vesković, Arsenijević, Mrdak

== Bracket ==
Semi-finals; 24 March
(Slovenia) Cinkarna Celje	77
(Serbia) Crvena zvezda	55
(Montenegro) Budućnost Bemax	74
(Bulgaria) Montana 2003	67

Final; 25 March
(Slovenia) Cinkarna Celje	68
(Montenegro) Budućnost Bemax	71
Third place
(Serbia) Crvena zvezda	69
(Bulgaria) Montana 2003	77

2017–18 Adriatic League champion

Budućnost Bemax
2nd Title

== Notes ==
- All times given below are in Eastern European Time / Eastern European Summer Time.
