= Živadinović =

Živadinović (Serbian Cyrillic: Живадиновић, pronounced [ʒiʋadǐːnoʋitɕ]) is a Serbian surname derived from a masculine given name Živadin. It may refer to:

- Milan Živadinović (1944–2021), Serbian football manager
- Milan Živadinović (footballer, born 1992), Serbian footballer
- Milana Živadinović (born 1991), Serbian basketballer
- Predrag Živadinović (born 1983), Serbian football player

== See also ==
- House of Dimitrije Živadinović
