= 2017–18 WABA League Group A =

Group A of the Adriatic League took place between 4 October 2017 and it ended on 21 December 2017.

The four best ranked teams advanced to the League 8.

== Standings ==
Place	Team	Pld	W	L	PF	PA	Diff	Pts	
1.	(Montenegro) Budućnost Bemax	10	8	2	749	527	+222	18	League 8
2.	(Serbia) Crvena zvezda	10	8	2	812	602	+210	18	League 8
3.	(Croatia) Trešnjevka 2009	10	5	5	689	703	-14	15	League 8
4.	(Bulgaria) Beroe	10	5	5	748	707	+41	15	League 8
5.	(Bosnia and Herzegovina) Play Off Ultra	10	4	6	714	744	-30	14	
6.	(Turkey) İstanbul Üniversitesi	10	0	10	478	907	-429	10	

== Fixtures and results ==
All times given below are in Central European Time (for the matches played in Bulgaria is time expressed in Eastern European Time, for the matches played in Turkey is time expressed in Further-eastern European Time).

=== Game 1 ===
4 October 2017
20:30

Report

Trešnjevka 2009	56–69	Beroe
Scoring by quarter: 11:19, 13:21, 21:17, 11:12
Pts: Erjavec 21; Rebs: Pavić 10; Asts: Kostić 6		Pts: Dineva 24; Rebs: Dineva 10; Asts: Ivanova 4

Dom Sportova, Zagreb
Attendance: 100
Referees: Srdić, Dejanović, Vuruna

4 October 2017
19:00

Report

Budućnost Bemax	97–33	İstanbul Üniversitesi
Scoring by quarter: 33:10, 24:10, 23:7, 17:6
Pts: Orozović, Hollivay 16; Rebs: Mitrašinović, Jakšić 6 Asts: Mujović 5		Pts: Akalan 13; Rebs: Zeybek, Sönmez 5 Asts: San 2

University Sports & Culture Hall, Podgorica
Attendance: 300
Referees: Jurcević, Pepur, Jurjević

4 October 2017
17:30

Report

Crvena zvezda	79–58	Play Off Ultra
Scoring by quarter: 23:16, 23:13, 19:16, 14:13
Pts: Đorđević 22; Rebs: Đorđević 10; Asts: A. Katanić 5		Pts: Kovačević 13; Rebs: Marković 11; Asts: Azinović 6

Železnik Hall, Belgrade
Attendance: 200
Referees: Tresoglavić, Mikulić, Hartman

=== Game 2 ===
11 October 2017
18:30

Report

Trešnjevka 2009	86–77	Play Off Ultra
Scoring by quarter: 15:19, 24:16, 27:20, 20:22
Pts: Erjavec 22; Rebs: Kostić 9 Asts: Erjavec 7		Pts: Marković 26; Rebs: Perić 8 Asts: Azinović, Kovačević 5

Sports Hall Pescenica, Zagreb
Attendance: 100
Referees: Pecelj, Sedlar, Jovičin

11 October 2017
16:00

Report

İstanbul Üniversitesi	45–120	Crvena zvezda
Scoring by quarter: 9:26, 9:30, 12:27, 15:37
Pts: Gezgin 14; Rebs: Gezgin 4 Asts: Cora 6		Pts: Bogićević 18; Rebs: Đorđević 11; Asts: Prlja 8

Prof. Dr. Turgay Atasü Spor Salonu, Istanbul
Attendance: 80
Referees: Prpić, Marunica, Glavurdić

12 October 2017
19:00

Report

Budućnost Bemax	72–49	Beroe
Scoring by quarter: 22:12, 18:9, 12:18, 20:10
Pts: Mitrašinović 16; Rebs: Hollivay 14; Asts: Mujović 7		Pts: Kostova 13; Rebs: Kostova 7 Asts: Boyadzhieva 3

University Sports&Culture Hall, Podgorica
Attendance: 400
Referees: Jurjević, Bajramović, Mjeda

=== Game 3 ===
19 October 2017
19:00

Report

Budućnost Bemax	80–49	Trešnjevka 2009
Scoring by quarter: 23:13, 19:12, 22:9, 16:15
Pts: Orozović 26; Rebs: Hollivay 14; Asts: Mujović 6		Pts: Mühl 15; Rebs: Pavić, Kostić 9 Asts: three players 1

University Sports&Culture Hall, Podgorica
Attendance: 400
Referees: Radanović, Knežević, Komar

18 October 2017
17:30

Report

Crvena zvezda	95–64	Beroe
Scoring by quarter: 26:23, 21:14, 26:14, 22:13
Pts: Prlja 19; Rebs: Đorđević 10; Asts: Prlja 9		Pts: Ivanova 14; Rebs: Natskina 7 Asts: Boyadzhieva 4

Železnik Hall, Belgrade
Attendance: 150
Referees: Skenderija, Vavan, Brestovac

18 October 2017
17:00

Report

Play Off Ultra	80–69	İstanbul Üniversitesi
Scoring by quarter: 19:11, 17:16, 27:16, 17:26
Pts: Kovačević 22; Rebs: Marković 9 Asts: Azinović 8		Pts: Akalan 16; Rebs: Akalan 5 Asts: Gezgin 4

Skenderija, Sarajevo
Attendance: n/a
Referees: Vesković, Miloradović, Pešić

=== Game 4 ===
25 October 2017
18:30

Report

Trešnjevka 2009	88–59	İstanbul Üniversitesi
Scoring by quarter: 23:15, 24:11, 18:19, 23:14
Pts: Erjavec 18; Rebs: Kostić 14; Asts: Kostić 10		Pts: Akalan 20; Rebs: Akalan 10; Asts: Gezgin, Topaloglu 5

Sports Hall Pescenica, Zagreb
Attendance: 50
Referees: Skenderija, Srdić, Dojčinović

25 October 2017
17:30

Report

Beroe	78–83	Play Off Ultra
Scoring by quarter: 24:23, 21:23, 20:18, 13:19
Pts: Dineva 24; Rebs: Kostova 12; Asts: Dineva, Ivanova 3		Pts: Džebo 30; Rebs: Marković 11; Asts: Kovačević 4

Municipal Hall, Stara Zagora
Attendance: 150
Referees: Lazov, Petrovski, Zafirovski

26 October 2017
19:00

Report

Budućnost Bemax	61–52	Crvena zvezda
Scoring by quarter: 18:13, 15:16, 17:7, 11:16
Pts: Filonchyk 14; Rebs: Hollivay 14; Asts: Hollivay 15		Pts: Stjepanović 15; Rebs: Bogićević 8 Asts: Katanić, Prlja 3

University Sports&Culture Hall, Podgorica
Attendance: 500
Referees: Živaljić, Mjeda, Jurjević

=== Game 5 ===
1 November 2017
19:30

Report

Crvena zvezda	80–52	Trešnjevka 2009
Scoring by quarter: 25:13, 19:11, 20:13, 16:15
Pts: A. Katanić 17; Rebs: Đorđević 12; Asts: Prlja		Pts: Mühl 15; Rebs: Kostić 11; Asts: Mühl, Kostić 4

Železnik Hall, Belgrade
Attendance: 200
Referees: Srdić, Stojančević, Vujinić

2 November 2017
18:00

Report

Play Off Ultra	64–79	Budućnost Bemax
Scoring by quarter: 20:21, 11:22, 12:16, 21:20
Pts: Džebo 22; Rebs: Kovačević 8 Asts: Azinović 10		Pts: Mujović 23; Rebs: Filonchyk 16; Asts: Mujović 7

Skenderija, Sarajevo
Attendance: 60
Referees: Pencinger, Palavra, Galiot

1 November 2017
16:00

Report

İstanbul Üniversitesi	42–92	Beroe
Scoring by quarter: 10:23, 11:23, 15:32, 6:14
Pts: Zeybek 11; Rebs: Akalan 10; Asts: Sönmez, Akalan 2		Pts: Nikolova 15; Rebs: Natskina, Ilieva 6 Asts: Ilieva 9

Prof. Dr. Turgay Atasü Spor Salonu, Istanbul
Attendance: n/a
Referees: Vesković, Miloradović, Pešić

=== Game 6 ===
22 November 2017
18:00

Report

Beroe	72–86	Trešnjevka 2009
Scoring by quarter: 20:24, 13:26, 27:16, 12:20
Pts: Banks 24; Rebs: Banks 13; Asts: Womack 7		Pts: Katavić 27; Rebs: Kostić 10; Asts: Kostić 9

Municipal Hall, Stara Zagora
Attendance: 100
Referees: Mihajlović, Trenčevski, Vlahov

22 November 2017
16:00

Report

İstanbul Üniversitesi	38–87	Budućnost Bemax
Scoring by quarter: 8:23, 8:16, 9:20, 13:28
Pts: Akalan 8 Rebs: Taylan, Sönmez 7 Asts: Sönmez 3		Pts: Hollivay 21; Rebs: Bigović 10; Asts: Mujović 5

Prof. Dr. Turgay Atasü Spor Salonu, Istanbul
Attendance: 56
Referees: Adamović, Skenderija, Dojčinović

23 November 2017
18:00

Report

Play Off Ultra	64–82	Crvena zvezda
Scoring by quarter: 21:18, 17:28, 12:15, 14:21
Pts: Džebo 20; Rebs: Džebo 6 Asts: Starčević 5		Pts: A. Katanić 22; Rebs: A. Katanić 10; Asts: A. Katanić 4

Skenderija, Sarajevo
Attendance: 50
Referees: Katić, Pencinger, Grubišić

=== Game 7 ===
30 November 2017
18:00

Report

Play Off Ultra	79–77	Trešnjevka 2009
Scoring by quarter: 20:14, 23:26, 14:22, 22:15
Pts: Džebo 32; Rebs: Džebo 10; Asts: Džombeta 10		Pts: Katavić 17; Rebs: Mühl 11; Asts: Mühl 9

Skenderija, Sarajevo
Attendance: 50
Referees: Vesković, Miloradović, Pešić

29 November 2017
19:30

Report

Crvena zvezda	84–40	İstanbul Üniversitesi
Scoring by quarter: 23:10, 23:11, 26:9, 12:10
Pts: Đorđević 16; Rebs: I. Katanić 8 Asts: A. Katanić 6		Pts: Akalan 19; Rebs: Akalan 6 Asts: Özen 3

Železnik Hall, Belgrade
Attendance: 100
Referees: Tresoglavić, Mikulić, Hartman

29 November 2017
18:00

Report

Beroe	59–81	Budućnost Bemax
Scoring by quarter: 15:17, 14:23, 14:24, 16:17
Pts: Wright 15; Rebs: Banks 14; Asts: Ivanova 5		Pts: Mitrašinović 19; Rebs: Mitrašinović, Filonchyk 9 Asts: Orozović 6

Municipal Hall, Stara Zagora
Attendance: 70
Referees: Mijalkovski, Davidov, Mihajlović

=== Game 8 ===
5 December 2017
19:30

Report

Trešnjevka 2009	62–57	Budućnost Bemax
Scoring by quarter: 14:14, 22:12, 8:23, 18:8
Pts: Erjavec 21; Rebs: Mühl 8 Asts: Katavić, Pavić 3		Pts: Orozović 21; Rebs: Mujović 10; Asts: Mujović 5

Dom sportova 2, Zagreb
Attendance: 50
Referees: Adamović, Srdić, Vujinić

6 December 2017
18:00

Report

Beroe	84–78	Crvena zvezda
Scoring by quarter: 14:23, 26:11, 15:24, 29:20
Pts: Banks 26; Rebs: Banks 17; Asts: Womack 5		Pts: Đorđević 22; Rebs: Đorđević 7 Asts: Prlja 6

Municipal Hall, Stara Zagora
Attendance: 70
Referees: Mihajlović, Petrović, Vlahov

6 December 2017
16:00

Report

İstanbul Üniversitesi	48–90	Play Off Ultra
Scoring by quarter: 4:28, 13:17, 15:30, 16:15
Pts: Büyükbayrak 20; Rebs: Akalan 11; Asts: Akalan 6		Pts: Marković 20; Rebs: Marković 21; Asts: Džombeta 7

Prof. Dr. Turgay Atasü Spor Salonu, Istanbul
Attendance: 43
Referees: Radinović, Radinović, Orbović

=== Game 9 ===
13 December 2017
16:00

Report

İstanbul Üniversitesi	58–64	Trešnjevka 2009
Scoring by quarter: 12:20, 22:8, 12:15, 12:21
Pts: Akalan 19; Rebs: Gezgin, Akalan 7 Asts: Gezgin 5		Pts: Katavić 15; Rebs: Katavić, Pavić 10; Asts: Katavić 8

Prof. Dr. Turgay Atasü Spor Salonu, Istanbul
Attendance: 150
Referees: Matić, Sedlar, Jovičin

10 December 2017
12:30

Report

Play Off Ultra	68–76	Beroe
Scoring by quarter: 13:19, 23:14, 13:19, 19:24
Pts: Džebo 25; Rebs: Azinović 8 Asts: Azinović 5		Pts: Banks 35; Rebs: Banks 11; Asts: Dineva 8

Municipal Hall, Stara Zagora
Attendance: 100
Referees: Vesković, Pecelj, Miloradović

14 December 2017
17:30

Report

Crvena zvezda	70–65	Budućnost Bemax
Scoring by quarter: 9:15, 20:18, 21:18, 20:14
Pts: Stjepanović 13; Rebs: Đorđević 9 Asts: Stjepanović, Prlja 3		Pts: Orozović 12; Rebs: Malone 6 Asts: Mujović 8

Železnik Hall, Belgrade
Attendance: 100
Referees: Knez, Tresoglavić, Mikulić

=== Game 10 ===
20 December 2017
18:30

Report

Trešnjevka 2009	69–72	Crvena zvezda
Scoring by quarter: 21:18, 14:16, 20:10, 14:28
Pts: Erjavec 22; Rebs: Pavić 10; Asts: Mühl 6		Pts: A. Katanić 12; Rebs: Bogićević 10; Asts: three players 3

Sports Hall Peščenica, Zagreb
Attendance: 100
Referees: Knežević, Skenderija, Vujinić

21 December 2017
19:00

Report

Budućnost Bemax	70–51	Play Off Ultra
Scoring by quarter: 11:16, 27:14, 22:10, 10:11
Pts: Mitrašinović 13; Rebs: Orozović 7 Asts: three players 4		Pts: Džebo 21; Rebs: Džombeta, Cato 5 Asts: Džombeta 3

University Sports&Culture Hall, Podgorica
Attendance: 400
Referees: Živaljić, Jurjević, Hordov

20 December 2017
18:00

Report

Beroe	105–46	İstanbul Üniversitesi
Scoring by quarter: 26:9, 21:13, 28:14, 30:10
Pts: Banks 18; Rebs: Nikolova 9 Asts: Ilieva 11		Pts: Akalan 13; Rebs: Sönmez 6 Asts: Zeybek 3

Municipal Hall, Stara Zagora
Attendance: 130
Referees: Panov, Zafirovski, Filipovski
