= 2024–25 Cyprus Women's Basketball Division A =

Women's basketball league in Cyprus

Cyprus Women's Basketball Division A
- Season: 2024–25
- Dates: Regular season: 13 October 2024 – 23 February 2025; Play Offs: 1–26 March 2025

Regular season
- Season MVP: (United States) Nina Rickards

Finals
- Champions: Sole Mare By The Sea AEL (18th title)
- Runners-up: Sigma Bakeries Anagennisi Germasogeia
- Finals MVP: (United States) Nina Rickards

Statistical leaders
Points	(United States) Mariah Miller	22.7
Rebounds	(United States) Dasia Thornton	14.5
Assists	(Cyprus) Ioanna Kyprianou	7.6
Steals	(Cyprus) Ioanna Kyprianou	3.4
Blocks	(United States) Dasia Thornton	2.1

The 2024–25 Cyprus Women's Basketball Division A is the 38th season of the top division women's basketball league in Cyprus since its establishment in 1987. It starts in October 2024 with the first round of the regular season and ends in March 2025.

Sole Mare By The Sea AEL are the defending champions.

Sole Mare By The Sea AEL won their eighteenth title after beating Sigma Bakeries Anagennisi Germasogeia in the final.

== Format ==
Each team plays each other three times. The top four teams qualify for the play offs. The semifinals are played as a best of three series while the final is played as a best of five series.

== Regular season ==
Pos	Team	Pld	W	L	PF	PA	PD	Pts	Qualification
1	Sole Mare By The Sea AEL	15	14	1	1118	788	+330	29	Play Offs
2	Sigma Bakeries Anagennisi Germasogeia	15	13	2	1140	720	+420	28	Play Offs
3	ETHA Engomis	15	9	6	1025	808	+217	24	Play Offs
4	APOP Riganato	15	6	9	864	941	−77	21	Play Offs
5	Hydra Insurance ENAD	15	2	13	699	1053	−354	17	
6	Zenonas Louki Akritas	15	1	14	638	1174	−536	16	

Source: First Division
Rules for classification: 1) Points; 2) Points difference; 3) Points scored.

== Play offs ==
Semifinals	Final
1	Sole Mare By The Sea AEL	70	90	2
4	APOP Riganato	56	39	0
1	Sole Mare By The Sea AEL	67	60	68	66	3
2	Sigma Bakeries Anagennisi Germasogeia	60	68	55	58	1
2	Sigma Bakeries Anagennisi Germasogeia	82	59	51	2
3	ETHA Engomis	63	67	48	1

Champions of Cyprus

Sole Mare By The Sea AEL
eighteenth title
