= Linos Gavriel =

Cypriot-Greek basketball coach (born 1975)

Al Ahly
- Position: Head coach
- League: Egyptian Basketball Premier League

Personal information
- Born: 1975 (age 50–51) London, United Kingdom
- Coaching career: 1997–present

Career history

Coaching
- 2001–2006: APOEL (assistant)
- 2006: APOEL
- 2007–2010: AEL Limassol women's team
- 2010–2012: AEL Limassol men's team
- 2012–2013: Étoile Sportive du Sahel
- 2014–2015: ES Radès
- 2015–2017: AEK Larnaca
- 2017–2018: Al-Ahli Club Manama
- 2019–2020: Panionios
- 2020–2021: Larisa
- 2019–2022: Cyprus
- 2021–2022: Manama Club
- 2022–2023: US Monastir
- 2023–2025: Manama Club
- 2025: Sagesse Club
- 2025–present: Al Ahly

Career highlights
- As head coach: WASL champion (2023); Bahraini Premier League champion (2022); Bahraini Cup winner (2022); Cyprus Division A champion (2016); Cypriot Cup winner (2017); Arab Club Basketball Championship champion (2015); Championnat National A champion (2013); Tunisian Cup winner (2013); 3× Cyprus Women's Division A champion (2008, 2009, 2010); 3× Cypriot Women's Cup winner (2008, 2009, 2010)

Pantelis "Linos" Gavriel (in Greek: Λίνος Γαβριήλ; born 1975) is a Cypriot-Greek professional basketball coach, currently working as the head coach of Al Ahly in the Egyptian Basketball Premier League. Gavriel has been successful in Cyprus, Greece, Bahrain, and Tunisia during his career, winning championships with several teams. He was also the coach for the Cyprus men's national basketball team from 2017 until 2021.

== Early life and education ==
Born in London, Gavriel was raised in the Greek city of Thessaloniki, and became interested in basketball after seeing the Greece national team win gold at EuroBasket 1987. He obtained a Bachelor's degree and Master's degree in physical education at Aristotle University of Thessaloniki. Gavriel later worked as a physical education professor at the University of Cyprus. He started coaching in 1997, while still being enrolled in university.

From 2001 to 2007, Gavriel worked for APOEL as assistant coach and the director of youth development. One of the players in the youth program of APOEL was Aleksandar Vezenkov, later to be a EuroLeague star player.

== Coaching career ==
Gavriel signed his first contract as head coach in 2006, taking over APOEL. After a year, he coached the AEL Limassol B.C. women's team for three seasons. In 2010, he switched to AEL Limassol men's team.

In 2012, at age 36, Gavriel became the head coach of Étoile Sportive du Sahel, the then continental champions of Africa. He guided Sahel to the Championnat National A and Tunisian Cup titles in his first season with the team. After two seasons, he transferred to ES Radès.

From 2015 to 2017, Gavriel returned to Cyprus and coached AEK Larnaca and guided the team to the double (Cyprus Basketball Division A and Cypriot Cup). He also coached the team to a successful run in the FIBA Europe Cup, reaching the top 16 in the team's first-ever European season.

He had a short stint in Bahrain, coaching Al-Ahli Club Manama in the 2017–18 season. After this, Gavriel returned for a second period at ES Radès. He left the team in April, after losing to JS Kairouan in the 2019 FIBA Africa Basketball League.

In the 2019–20 season, Gavriel coached Panionios of the Greek Basket League after they signed him in October. The season was marked by the COVID-19 pandemic which led to the cancellation of the league and Panionios finishing in 12th place.

The following season, he coached Larisa who entered the Greek League with a wild card.

After the season in Greece, Lavriel signed with Manama Club in the Bahraini Premier League, his second stint in the country. Manama won the national double, winning the Bahraini Premier League and the Bahraini Cup.

In October 2022, Gavriel became the head coach of US Monastir, defending BAL champions, replacing outgoing coach Marouan Kechrid. He coached Monastir in the 2023 FIBA Intercontinental Cup. Gavriel did not coach in the 2023 BAL season, as his predecessor Miodrag Perišić took over the team in May.

=== Cyprus national team ===
In the autumn of 2017, he was assigned as head coach of the Cyprus men's national basketball team. He extended his contract again in October 2019, committing himself to the end of 2022.

== Honours ==
Manama Club

- Bahraini Premier League: (2022)
- Bahraini Cup: (2022)

ES Sahel

- Championnat National A: (2013)
- Tunisian Cup: (2013)
- FIBA Africa Clubs Champions Cup runners-up: (2013)
- Arab Club Basketball Championship: (2015)

AEK Larnaca

- Cyprus Basketball Division A: (2016)
- Cypriot Cup: (2017)

AEL Limassol women's team

- 3× Cyprus Women's Division A: (2008, 2009, 2010)
- 3× Cypriot Women's Cup: (2008, 2009, 2010)
