= Keravnos =

Keravnos:

- Keravnos B.C., Cyprus basketball club.
- Keravnos B.C. (women), Cyprus women's basketball club.
- Greek destroyer Keravnos, Greek destroyer.
