= Marija Petrović =

Marija Petrović may refer to:

- Marija Petrović (handballer), Serbian handball player
- Marija Petrović (basketball), Serbian basketball player
- Marija Petrović (chess player), Serbian chess player
