= Keravnos B.C. (women) =

Keravnos
- Leagues: Cyprus Women's Basketball Division A
- Founded: 1926; 99 years ago
- History: Keravnos B.C. (1926–present)
- Arena: Costas Papaellinas Arena
- Capacity: 2,000
- Location: Strovolos, Nicosia, Cyprus
- Team colors: Maroon, Gold, White
- Championships: 9 Cypriot Championships; 9 Cypriot Cups; 9 Cypriot Supercups
- Website: www.keravnosbc.com
Home	Away

Keravnos B.C. (Greek: Γυμναστικός Σύλλογος Στροβόλου «Ο Κεραυνός») is a professional women's basketball club based in Strovolos, Nicosia, Cyprus. The club is playing in the Cyprus Women's Basketball Division A. The first division of women's basketball was established in 1987 and Keravnos participates in the Cyprus Basketball Federation competitions ever since.

The club has enjoyed considerable success and has also represented Cyprus in European competitions. In 1992, the team qualified for the Cyprus Cup Final for the first time but lost by two points to Olympiada. The women won their first Championship in 1994, and then went on to win the championship for three consecutive years. From season 1998, 99 and up until 2005, they dominated the Cypriot basketball winning the double and the Super Cup every year, apart from the Championship in 2003 which was won by AEL.

== Honours ==
- Cyprus Women's Basketball Division A:
  - Winners (9): 1994, 1995, 1996, 1999, 2000, 2001, 2002, 2004, 2005
  - Runners-up (7): 2003, 2006, 2008, 2009, 2012, 2013, 2014, 2015,
- Cyprus Women's Basketball Cup:
  - Winners (9): 1999, 2000, 2001, 2002, 2003, 2004, 2005, 2013, 2016
  - Runners-up (4): 2006, 2007, 2012, 2015
- Cyprus Women's Basketball Super Cup:
  - Winners (9): 1999, 2000, 2001, 2002, 2003, 2004, 2005, 2013, 2016
