= Zorica Mitov =

Serbian basketball player

No. 10 – Vršac
- Position: Power forward / center
- League: First League of Serbia

Personal information
- Born: 17 March 1987 (age 39) Vršac, SFR Yugoslavia
- Listed height: 1.88 m (6 ft 2 in)
- Listed weight: 81 kg (179 lb)

Career information
- WNBA draft: 2009: undrafted
- Playing career: 2003–present

Career history
- 2003-2004: Hemofarm Vrsac (1A League)
- 2004-2005: Kovin (1A League)
- 2005-2006: Hemofarm Vrsac (1A, EuroCup: 7 games)
- 2006-2007: Hemofarm Vrsac (1A, EuroCup: 8 games)
- 2007–2008: Hemofarm Vrsac (A League)
- 2008–2009: Hemofarm Stada Vrsac (A League, EuroCup: 12 games)
- 2009–2010: Hemofarm Stada Vrsac (A League, EuroCup: 6 games)
- 2010–2011: Acer ERG Priolo (Italy-A1), left in Jan.'11
- 2010-2011: Mladi Krajisnik Banja Luka(Bosnia-D1): 5 games
- 2011-2012: Mladi Krajisnik Banja Luka (Bosnia-D1): Bosnian League: 9 games, Adriatic League: 16 games
- 2012-2013: SCM CSS Craiova (Romania-Division A): 27 games
- 2013-2014: ASC Sepsi SIC Sfantu Gheorghe (Romania-Liga Nationala): 31 games, EuroCup: 6 games
- 2014-2015: Olimpia CSU Brasov (Romania-Liga Nationala): 31 games
- 2015-2016: CS BC Danzio Timisoara (Romania-Liga Nationala): 13 games, left in Jan.'16
- 2015-2016: Gruner Stern Keltern (Germany-DBBL): 11 games
- 2016-2017: ZKK Swisslion Vrsac (Serbia-1 ZLS): 23 games in April moved to Flamutari Vlore (Albania-Division A)
- 2017-2018: BC Sirius Targu Mures (Romania-Liga Nationala) in February moved to BBC Etzella Ettelbruck (Luxembourg-Total League)
- 2020-2021: Les Sangliers Wooltz Luxembourg (Nationale 2 Dames)
- 2021-2022: Les Sangliers Wooltz Luxembourg (LBBL Dames)
Medals
Women's basketball
Representing Serbia
European U20 Championship
Silver medal – second place	2007 Bulgaria	Team
World U19 Championship
Silver medal – second place	2005 Tunisia	Team
European U18 Championship
Gold medal – first place	2005 Hungary	Team
European U16 Championship
Gold medal – first place	2003 Turkey	Team

Zorica Mitov (Serbian Cyrillic: Зорицa Митов, born 17 March 1987) is a Serbian female basketball player.
