= Marija Todorović =

Serbian politician

Marija Todorović (Serbian Cyrillic: Марија Тодоровић; born 1992) is a politician in Serbia. She has served in the National Assembly of Serbia since 2020 as a member of the Serbian Progressive Party.

== Private life ==
Todorović was born in Brus, Serbia, in what was then Yugoslavia. She has a bachelor's degree in economics and is a member of the Progressive Party's municipal board in Brus.

== Politician ==
Todorović received the ninety-sixth position on the Progressive Party's Aleksandar Vučić — For Our Children list in the 2020 parliamentary election and was elected when the list won a landslide majority with 188 mandates. She is now a member of the assembly's environmental protection committee, a deputy member of the culture and information committee and the health and family committee, the head of Serbia's parliamentary friendship group with the Philippines, and a member of the parliamentary friendship groups with China, Cyprus, Greece, Hungary, Japan, Norway, Russia, Spain, Switzerland, and the United Arab Emirates.
