= Anđelina Radić =

Serbian basketball player

No. 22 – Crvena zvezda
- Position: Power forward
- League: Basketball League of Serbia; EuroCup Women

Personal information
- Born: 18 November 1994 (age 31) Loznica, FR Yugoslavia
- Listed height: 187 cm (6 ft 2 in)

Career information
- WNBA draft: 2015: undrafted
- Playing career: 2010–present

Career history
- 2010–2013: Vršac
- 2013–2014: Partizan
- 2014–2015: Bor
- 2015–2016: Vojvodina
- 2016–2017: Kraljevo
- 2017–2018: Spirou Ladies Charleroi
- 2018–2019: Willebroek
- 2019–2020: Rutronik Stars Keltern
- 2021–2022: Eisvögel USC Freiburg
- 2022–2023: SKK Polonia Warsaw
- 2023–2024: Basket 25 Bydgoszcz
- 2024-2025: Crvena zvezda
- 2025-present: Vilniaus Kibirkštis

Anđelina Radić (Serbian Cyrillic: Анђелина Радић, born 18 November 1994 in Loznica, FR Yugoslavia) is a Serbian professional basketball player. She currently plays for Serbian team Crvena zvezda.

== Honours ==
ŽKK Vršac

- National Cup of Serbia (1): 2011–12

ŽKK Vojvodina

- National Cup of Serbia (1): 2014–15
