= House of Dimitrije Živadinović =

- House of Dimitrije Živadinović
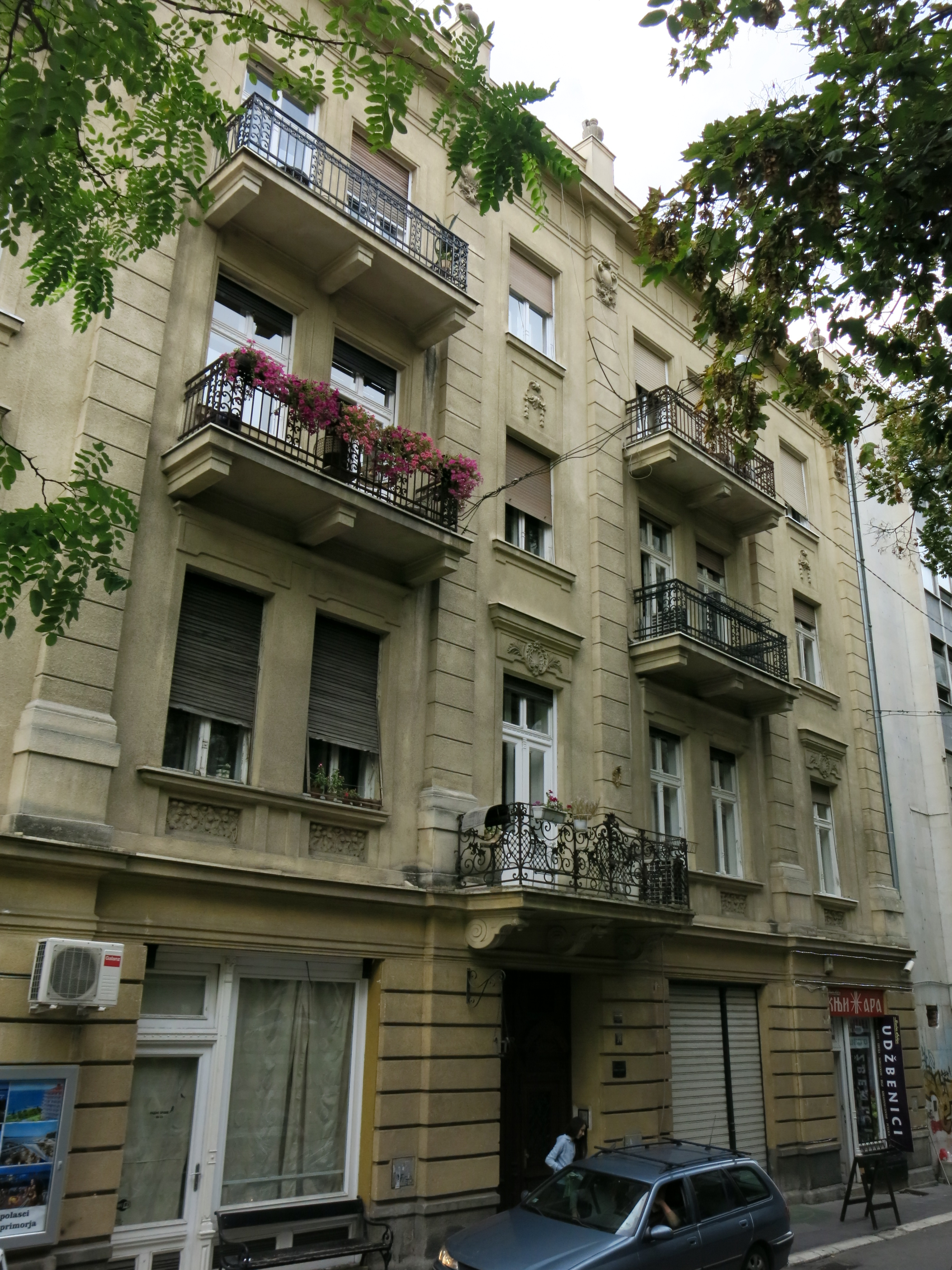
- Interactive map of the House of Dimitrije Živadinović area

General information
- Status: Cultural monument
- Location: Stari Grad, Belgrade, Serbia
- Coordinates: 44°49′N 20°27′E
- Completed: 1904

Design and construction
- Designations: Competent institution for protection: Institute for the Protection of Cultural Monuments, Head office: Belgrade, Address 14, Kalemegdan, 11000

Website
- beogradskonasledje.rs

House of Dimitrije Živadinović is located in Belgrade, in the territory of the city municipality of Stari Grad. It was built in 1904 and represents immovable cultural property as a сultural monument.

== History ==
House of Dimitrije Živadinović was built according to the project of the famous Belgrade architect Milan Antonović as a business-residential building with space for trade in securities in the basement and the ground floor and living quarters upstairs. This representative building of a reputable banker, merchant and president of the Managing Board of the Belgrade Cooperative in Belgrade Charshia had the qualities of Art Nouveau architecture, with a strong seal of аcademic аrchitecture.

The entrance hall was painted by the famous decorative painter Dragutin Inkiostri. Two floors were added in 1926–1927, designed by the architect Samuel Sumbula which did not significantly change the original appearance of the building. The character of the building stems from the fact that it represents the work of one of the most famous architects of Belgrade and testifies about the personality of the investor that left a legacy of valuable architectural objects to Belgrade.

At the end of the 19th century, architect Antonović founded a private bureau and worked in it until his death. He is one of the first Serbian architects who had a private bureau. After the First World War, Antonović executed works on street repaving and landscaping, with further work on the design of buildings. At the beginning of his career, he designed the Palilula Elementary School and the State Hospital complex. Later he designed mainly private residential buildings. Among office buildings, he also designed the Photo Studio of Milan Jovanović, and insurance companies, private individuals and a cultural association were investors into his business and residential buildings.

== Dimitrije Živadinović ==
Dimitrije Živadinović was the father-in-law of General Aleksandar Dimitrijević and Marshal of the court of King Aleksandar Karađorđević. In addition to the house in Gračanička Street, Dimitrije erected a two-story building on the corner of Uskočka and Knez Mihailova Street, into which he moved his business. This building was later purchased by the Belgrade merchant Vlada Mitić, and after World War II, it went to the "Belgrade" Department Stores.

== See more ==
- List of cultural monuments in Belgrade
- Milan Antonović
