= Milan Živadinović (footballer, born 1992) =

Serbian footballer

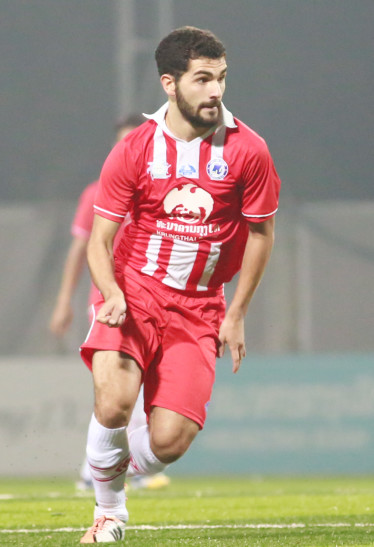
- Živadinović in 2015

Personal information
- Full name: Milan Živadinović
- Date of birth: 13 April 1992 (age 34)
- Place of birth: Požarevac, Yugoslavia
- Height: 1.73 m (5 ft 8 in)
- Position: Midfielder

Senior career*
Years	Team	Apps	(Gls)
2009–2010	Sloga 33	13	(2)
2010–2011	Rudar Kostolac	22	(4)
2011–2014	Mladi Radnik	40	(7)
2015–2016	Lanexang United	10	(0)
2016–2017	Nakhon Phanom		
2017–2018	Hamrun Spartans		
2019	Mladi Radnik		
2019–2020	RSK Rabrovo		
2020–2022	Rudar Kostolac		
- * Club domestic league appearances and goals

Milan Živadinović (Serbian Cyrillic: Милан Живадиновић; born 13 April 1992) is a Serbian footballer who plays as midfielder.

== Club career ==
=== Mladi Radnik ===
In February, 2011, it was announced that Živadinović signed a 3-year contract with Mladi Radnik.

=== Lanexang United ===
On February 1, 2015, it was announced that Milan signed a year contract with Lanexang United.
