= Independent Macedonia (sport hall) =

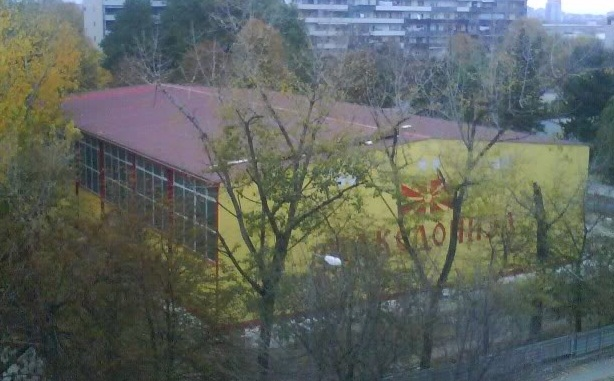
Independent Macedonia Sport Hall

Independent Macedonia sport hall (Macedonian: Независна Македонија, romanized: Nezavisna Makedonija) is a multi-functional indoor sports arena. It is located in the municipality of Kisela Voda in Skopje.

== Uses ==
Independent Macedonia is home to basketball team Torus that plays in the first league.
