= Aminata Fall (basketball) =

Senegalese basketball player

No. 35 – İstanbul Üniversitesi
- Position: Center
- League: TKBL

Personal information
- Born: 13 August 1991 (age 35) Nguidilé, Senegal
- Listed height: 6 ft 4 in (1.93 m)

Career information
- College: Southern Nazarene (2012–15)
- WNBA draft: 2015: undrafted

Aminata Fall (born 13 August 1991) is a Senegalese basketball player for İstanbul Üniversitesi SK and the Senegalese national team.

She participated at the 2018 FIBA Women's Basketball World Cup.

== Southern Nazarene statistics ==
Ratios
Year	Team	GP	FG%	3P%	FT%	RBG	APG	BPG	SPG	PPG
2012-13	Southern Nazarene	30	45.8%	30.8%	65.7%	14.33	1.43	3.20	1.37	13.90
2013-14	Southern Nazarene	24	42.6%	26.3%	82.6%	14.79	1.79	3.13	1.29	18.46
2014-15	Southern Nazarene	26	37.9%	30.9%	79.6%	11.31	2.39	4.31	0.92	21.35
Career		80	41.6%	30.2%	76.7%	13.49	1.85	3.54	1.20	17.69

Totals
Year	Team	GP	FG	FGA	3P	3PA	FT	FTA	REB	A	BK	ST	PTS
2012-13	Southern Nazarene	30	173	378	4	13	67	102	430	43	96	41	417
2013-14	Southern Nazarene	24	174	408	5	19	90	109	355	43	75	31	443
2014-15	Southern Nazarene	26	198	523	30	97	129	162	294	62	112	24	555
Career		80	545	1309	39	129	286	373	1079	148	283	96	1415
