= AEL Limassol B.C. (women) =

AEL Limassol WBC
- Nickname: Vasilissa (The Queen) (Greek: Βασίλισσα)
- Leagues: Cyprus Women's Basketball Division A
- Founded: 1989; 37 years ago
- Arena: Nicos Solomonides Arena
- Capacity: 2,500
- Location: Limassol, Cyprus
- Team colors: Yellow and Blue
- President: Antonis Tomazos
- Head coach: Michalis Kounounis
- Assistant: Anthia Papadouri
- Championships: 19 Cypriot Championships; 18 Cypriot Cups; 13 Cypriot Super Cups
Home	Away

AEL Limassol Women Basketball Club (Greek: Αθλητική Ένωση Λεμεσού, romanized: Athlitiki Enosi Lemesou, lit. 'Athletic Union of Limassol'), commonly referred to as AEL (Greek: ΑΕΛ), is a Cypriot professional basketball club based in Limassol. The women's section of the Basketball club is also nicknamed The Queen and since the introduction of women's professional basketball on the island, AEL women has developed into one of the most successful teams in Cyprus.

The women's basketball club competes in the Cyprus Women's Basketball Division A and is one of the most successful clubs in Cyprus. The club holds the record for the most national championships (19) and most Cypriot Cups won (18). The club's most recent championship came during the 2023–24 Cyprus Women's Basketball Division A, after having defeated Annagennisi Germasogeias BC . The club has regularly participated in multiple European competitions such as the Women Eurocup 2024-25.

== Honours ==
Honour	No.	Years
Championship titles:	19	1993, 1997, 1998, 2003, 2006, 2007, 2008, 2009, 2010, 2011, 2012, 2013, 2014, 2015, 2016, 2023, 2024, 2025, 2026
Cup titles:	18	1993, 1995, 1996, 1997, 1998, 2006, 2008, 2009, 2010, 2011, 2012, 2014, 2015, 2016, 2020, 2024, 2025, 2026
Super Cup titles:	13	1998, 2006, 2007, 2008, 2009, 2012, 2013, 2014, 2015, 2021, 2024, 2025, 2026

== Players ==
=== AEL Limassol WBC - Current roster (2026/27) ===
Players

Pos.	Νο.	Nat.	Name	Ht.
PG	0	(Cyprus)	Koukouri, Anna	1.72 m (5 ft 8 in)
PG	2	(Cyprus)	Fteroudi, Ioanna	1.60 m (5 ft 3 in)
G	3	(United States)	Mead, Alexis	1.63 m (5 ft 4 in)
C	5	(Cyprus)	Pilakouta, Eleni	1.90 m (6 ft 3 in)
PG	6	(Poland)	Piędel, Kinga	1.71 m (5 ft 7 in)
PF	8	(France) (Morocco)	Ousfar, Sarah	1.83 m (6 ft 0 in)
F	9	(Cyprus) (Serbia)	Raca, Tijana	1.82 m (6 ft 0 in)
PG	12	(Cyprus)	Mavroudi, Eleni	1.73 m (5 ft 8 in)
G	13	(Cyprus)	Antoniou, Rafaella	1.70 m (5 ft 7 in)
G	17	(Cyprus)	Dimitriadi, Evelina	1.74 m (5 ft 9 in)
F/C	21	(Cyprus)	Papalla, Dimitra	1.84 m (6 ft 0 in)
G	22	(United States)	Quinerly, JJ	1.73 m (5 ft 8 in)
PF	23	(Cyprus)	Themistokleous, Panagiota	1.85 m (6 ft 1 in)
C	24	(Cyprus)	Gennari, Nefeli	1.76 m (5 ft 9 in)
F/C	35	(Latvia)	Sila, Luīze	1.88 m (6 ft 2 in)
C	44	(Cyprus)	Oikonomidou, Eleni	1.80 m (5 ft 11 in)

Coaches

Head coach

- (Cyprus) Michalis Kounounis

Assistant coach

- (Cyprus) Anthia Papadouri

Team Manager

Captain (C)

== Women's European campaigns ==
Season	Competition	Games	Won/Lost	Win %
1994	FIBA Women European Cup	2	0/2	0%
1996	FIBA Women European Cup	2	0/2	0%
2007	FIBA Women EuroCup	6	0/6	0%
2008	FIBA Women EuroCup	10	4/6	40%
2009	FIBA Women EuroCup	10	6/4	60%
2010	FIBA Women EuroCup	12	7/5	58.34%
2024	FIBA Women EuroCup	6	0/6	0%
Total		48	17/31	35.42%
