= Milica Špikić =

Serbian basketball player

Personal information
- Born: 28 March 1991 (age 35) Jagodina, SFR Yugoslavia
- Listed height: 174 cm (5 ft 9 in)

Career information
- WNBA draft: 2013: undrafted
- Playing career: 2009–2018
- Position: Shooting guard

Career history
- 2009–2011: Partizan
- 2011–2013: Stara Pazova
- 2013–2014: Radnički Kragujevac
- 2014–2018: Partizan

Milica Špikić (Serbian Cyrillic: Милица Шпикић, born 28 March 1991 in Jagodina, SFR Yugoslavia) is a former Serbian professional basketball player. In career she played for Partizan, Stara Pazova and Radnički Kragujevac.

== Honours ==
Partizan

- National Cup of Serbia (2): 2010–11, 2017–18
