= Suzana Milovanović =

Serbian basketball player

No. 14 – Partizan
- Position: Small forward
- League: First League of Serbia; Adriatic League Women

Personal information
- Born: 12 November 1979 (age 47) Loznica, SFR Yugoslavia
- Listed height: 185 cm (6 ft 1 in)

Career information
- WNBA draft: 2001: undrafted
- Playing career: 199?–present

Career history
- Partizan
- 2003–2005: Vojvodina
- 2005–2006: Caja Canarias
- 2007–2008: ICIM Arad
- 2008–2009: Tarbes
- 2009: Wasserburg
- 2009–2010: ICIM Arad
- 2010–2011: Toulouse
- 2011–2015: ICIM Arad
- 2015–present: Partizan

Suzana Milovanović (Serbian Cyrillic: Сузана Миловановић, born 12 November 1979 in Loznica, SFR Yugoslavia) is a Serbian female basketball player. She plays small forward position.
