= Jelena Ćulafić =

Montenegrin basketball player

Partizan 1953
- Position: Shooting guard
- League: Serbian First League; Adriatic League Women

Personal information
- Born: 8 June 1989 (age 37) Berane, SFR Yugoslavia
- Listed height: 1.72 m (5 ft 8 in)
- Listed weight: 68 kg (150 lb)

Career information
- WNBA draft: 2011: undrafted
- Playing career: 2003–present

Career history
- 2003–2005: Bijela Herceg Novi
- 2005–2009: Budućnost Podgorica
- 2009: Ragusa Dubrovnik
- 2009–2010: Mladi Krajišnik
- 2011–2013: Željezničar Sarajevo
- 2013–2016: Šumadija Kragujevac
- 2016–present: Partizan 1953

Jelena Ćulafić (Serbian: Јелена Ћулафић; born 8 June 1989) is a Montenegrin basketball player.
