= Rada Vidović =

Serbian basketball player

Personal information
- Born: 21 September 1979 (age 47) Sombor, SFR Yugoslavia
- Listed height: 1.77 m (5 ft 10 in)

Career information
- WNBA draft: 2001: undrafted
- Playing career: 1998–2018
- Position: Shooting guard

Career history

Playing
- 2002–2003: Vojvodina
- 2004–2008: A.S. Ramat HaSharon
- 2008–2009: Spartak Subotica
- 2009: Libertas Trogylos Basket
- 2009–2010: Željezničar Sarajevo
- 2011–2012: Čelik Zenica
- 2012–2013: E.B. Kirovograd
- 2013–2014: M.B. Marbo Kinna
- 2014: Vojvodina
- 2014–2015: Spartak Subotica
- 2015–2016: Slovanka MB
- 2016–2017: Spartak Subotica
- 2017–2018: Partizan

Coaching
- 2017: Partizan (assistant coach)

Rada Vidović (Serbian: Рада Видовић; born 21 September 1979 in Sombor, SFR Yugoslavia) is a former Serbian female basketball player. She ended her career at Partizan.
