= Iva Todorić =

Croatian basketball player

No. 10 – Medveščak
- Position: Small forward

Personal information
- Born: 24 March 1993 (age 33) Imotski, Croatia
- Listed height: 1.74 m (5 ft 9 in)

Career information
- Playing career: 2010–present

Career history
- 2010–2011: Studenac Omiš
- 2011–present: Medveščak

Iva Todorić (born 24 March 1993 in Imotski, Croatia) is a Croatian female basketball player.
