= Cyprus Women's Basketball Division A =

- Current season, competition or edition: 2024–25 Cyprus Women's Basketball Division A
- Sport: Basketball
- Founded: 1987
- No. of teams: 6
- Country: Cyprus
- Continent: (European Union) FIBA Europe
- Most recent champions: AEL Limassol (19th title) (2025–26)
- Most titles: AEL Limassol (19 titles)
- Related competitions: Cypriot Women's Cup; Cypriot Women's Super Cup
- Website: Cyprus Basketball Federation

The Cyprus Women's Basketball Division A is the top-tier level competition on the Cyprus basketball calendar for women. It is run and governed by the Cyprus Basketball Federation.

== Format ==
In the 2024-25 season there were six teams competing in the league. In the first phase, each club plays the others three times, which makes a total of 15 games for each club.

In the second phase, the team that finished in first place plays against the team that finished in fourth place, and the team that finishes in second place plays against the team that finished in third place. The teams that wins two times (best of three) proceed to the finals.

At the finals the teams that succeeded from the second phase play against each other, with the team that has the higher position in the first phase starting in their home ground. The first team that win three times (best of five) win the championship.

== Teams ==
The following teams (in alphabetical order) are competing in the 2024–25 season:

- AEL Limassol – Limassol
- Anagennisi Germasogeias – Limassol
- APOP – Paphos
- ENAD – Nicosia
- ETHA – Nicosia
- Zenon – Larnaca

== Champions ==
Season	Champion	Runner-up	Score
1987–88	ENAD		
1988–89	ENAD		
1989–90	Olympiada		
1990–91	Olympiada		
1991–92	ETHA		
1992–93	AEL	ENAD	3–2
1993–94	Keravnos	ENAD	Final 62–52
1994–95	Keravnos	AEL	4–1
1995–96	Keravnos	AEL	4–2
1996–97	AEL	Keravnos	4–1
1997–98	AEL	Keravnos	4–2
1998–99	Keravnos	AEL	4–2
1999–00	Keravnos	ENAD	3–2
2000–01	Keravnos	Achilleas	3–2
2001–02	Keravnos	AEL	4–2
2002–03	AEL	Keravnos	3–0
2003–04	Keravnos		
2004–05	Keravnos	APOEL B.C.	3–1
2005–06	AEL	Keravnos	3–1
2006–07	AEL	Achilleas	3–0
2007–08	AEL	Keravnos B.C.	3–2
2008–09	AEL	Keravnos B.C.	
2009–10	AEL	Achilleas	3–0
2010–11	AEL	AEK	3–2
2011–12	AEL	Keravnos	3–2
2012–13	AEL	Keravnos	3–0
2013–14	AEL		
2014–15	AEL	Apollon Limassol	3–0
2015–16	AEL	Keravnos	3–2
2016-17	Keravnos	AEL	3–2
2017-18	Keravnos	AEL	3–2
2018-19	Keravnos	AEL	3–0
2019-20			
2020-21	Anorthosis	AEL	3–1
2021-22	Anagennisi Germasogias	AEL	3–2
2022–23	AEL	Anagennisi Germasogias	3–0
2023–24	AEL	Anagennisi Germasogias	3–0
2024–25	AEL	Anagennisi Germasogias	3–1
2025–26	AEL	Anagennisi Germasogias	3–0

== Performance by club ==
Team	Winners	Years won
AEL Limassol	19	1993, 1997, 1998, 2003, 2006, 2007, 2008, 2009, 2010, 2011, 2012, 2013, 2014, 2015, 2016, 2023, 2024, 2025, 2026
Keravnos	12	1994, 1995, 1996, 1999, 2000, 2001, 2002, 2004, 2005, 2017, 2018, 2019
ENAD	2	1988, 1989
Olympiada	2	1990, 1991
Anagennisi Germasogeias	1	2022
Anorthosis	1	2021
ETHA	1	1992

== See also ==
- Cypriot Basketball Cup
- Cypriot Basketball Super Cup
- Cypriot Women's Basketball Cup
- Cypriot Women's Basketball Super Cup
