= Oderah Chidom =

Nigerian-American basketball player

Personal information
- Born: 9 July 1995 (age 31) Hayward, California, United States
- Listed height: 1.93 m (6 ft 4 in)

Career information
- High school: Bishop O'Dowd High School (Oakland, California)
- College: Duke (2013–2017)
- WNBA draft: 2017: 3rd round, 31st overall pick
- Drafted by: Atlanta Dream
- Position: Center

Career highlights
- McDonald's All-American (2013)
- Stats at Basketball Reference
Medals
AfroBasket
Gold medal – first place	2021 Cameroon
Women's basketball
Representing the United States
FIBA Under-17 World Cup
Gold medal – first place	2012 Netherlands	Team

Oderah Obiageli Chidom (born 9 July 1995) is a Nigerian-American professional basketball player who plays for the Nigeria women's national team.

Chidom has two younger siblings: a brother, Arinze, and a sister, Amara. She went to Bishop O’Dowd High School in Oakland, California, where she played on their Varsity Women's basketball team.

She played for Duke University. She was drafted by the Atlanta Dream. She played for the Tsmoki-Minsk. She signed to play for Angers.

She participated at the U17 Women's Basketball Championship. She participated at 2019 EuroCup Women. She qualified for the 2020 Summer Olympics.

== Career statistics ==
Legend
GP	Games played	GS	Games started	MPG	Minutes per game	RPG	Rebounds per game
APG	Assists per game	SPG	Steals per game	BPG	Blocks per game	PPG	Points per game
TO	Turnovers per game	FG%	Field-goal percentage	3P%	3-point field-goal percentage	FT%	Free-throw percentage
**Bold**	Career best	°	League leader

=== College ===
Year	Team	GP	GS	MPG	FG%	3P%	FT%	RPG	APG	SPG	BPG	TO	PPG
2013–14	Duke	**35**	1	14.3	**60.3**	0.0	58.3	4.0	0.4	0.6	0.8	**1.4**	5.7
2014–15	Duke	21	6	19.3	56.6	0.0	**68.6**	5.0	**1.9**	1.0	0.9	2.0	8.5
2015–16	Duke	32	**25**	**24.2**	53.4	0.0	59.2	**6.5**	1.2	**1.1**	1.2	2.5	**9.6**
2016–17	Duke	34	23	22.2	53.9	**33.3**	53.8	5.2	1.5	**1.1**	**2.0**	2.2	8.1
**Career**		122	55	20.0	55.4	25.0	59.1	5.2	1.2	0.9	1.3	2.0	7.9
Statistics retrieved from Sports-Reference.
