= Marija Petrović (basketball) =

Serbian basketball player (born 1988)

Marija Petrović Cvetković
Personal information
- Born: October 12, 1988 (age 38) Leskovac, SFR Yugoslavia
- Listed height: 1.73 m (5 ft 8 in)

Career information
- WNBA draft: 2010: undrafted
- Playing career: –2018
- Position: Point guard / shooting guard

Career history
- Aktivis Leskovac
- 2007–2008: Imperial AEL Limassol
- 2011–2014: Student Niš
- 2014–2015: Bor
- 2015–2018: Partizan 1953

Career highlights
- Serbian Cup winner (2018); Cyprus champion (2008); Cyprus Cup winner (2008)

Marija Petrović Cvetković (Serbian Cyrillic: Марија Петровић Цветковић; born 12 October 1988), née Marija Petrović, is a former Serbian professional basketball player.

== Basketball career ==
Petrović started his basketball career playing with the youth teams of the Actavis Academy from Leskovac. She played one season for the AEL Limassol of the Cyprus Division A. Also, she played for the Student Niš and ŽKK Bor of the First League of Serbia before join Partizan in 2015.
