= Marija Prlja =

Serbian basketball player

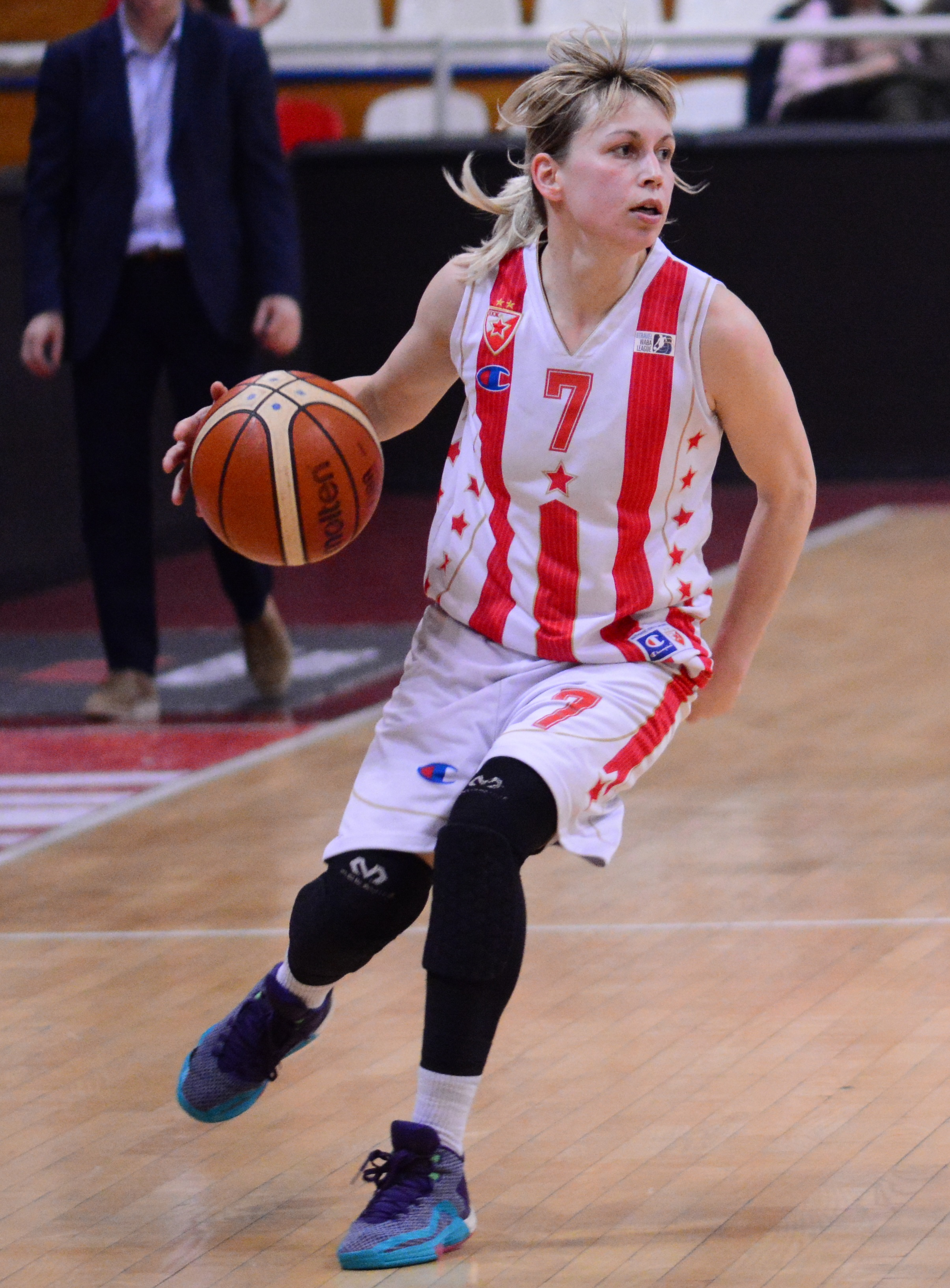

No. 7 – Crvena zvezda
- Position: Point guard
- League: First League of Serbia; Adriatic League Women

Personal information
- Born: 11 December 1987 (age 38) Belgrade, SFR Yugoslavia
- Listed height: 163 cm (5 ft 4 in)

Career information
- WNBA draft: 2009: undrafted

Career history
- 2009–2011: Voždovac
- 2011–2012: BCT Alexandria
- 2013: Partizan
- 2013–2014: Željezničar Sarajevo
- 2014: Play Off Sarajevo
- 2014: Partizan
- 2015: SBS Ostrava
- 2015–2016: Cluj-Napoca
- 2016–present: Crvena zvezda

Marija Prlja (Serbian Cyrillic: Марија Прља, born 11 December 1987 in Belgrade, SFR Yugoslavia) is a Serbian female basketball player. She plays at point guard position in Crvena zvezda.
