= Andrea Marić =

Croatian basketball player (born 1997)

No. 15 – Cinkarna Celje
- Position: Center
- League: First League of Slovenia; Adriatic league

Personal information
- Born: October 6, 1997 (age 29) Posušje, Bosnia and Herzegovina
- Listed height: 1.95 m (6 ft 5 in)

Career history
- Posušje
- –2014: Novi Zagreb
- 2014–2015: Trešnjevka 2009
- 2015–present: Cinkarna Celje

Andrea Marić (born 6 October 1997 in Posušje, Bosnia and Herzegovina) is a Croatian female professional basketball player on Cinkarna Celje. She previously played for Posušje, Novi Zagreb and Trešnjevka 2009.
