= Kristina Topuzović =

Serbian women's basketball player (born 1994)

Sepsi SIC
- Position: Power forward
- League: Liga Națională

Personal information
- Born: 23 August 1994 (age 32) Šabac, Serbia, FR Yugoslavia
- Listed height: 1.83 m (6 ft 0 in)

Career information
- WNBA draft: 2014: undrafted

Career history
- –2010: Šabac
- 2010–2016: Radivoj Korać
- 2016–2018: Budućnost Volcano
- 2018–2019: Crvena zvezda
- 2019–present: Sepsi SIC

Career highlights
- 3x Serbian League champion (2014 – 2016); Serbian Cup winner (2014); Adriatic League champion (2014); Adriatic League champion (2018)
Medals
Women's basketball
Representing Serbia
EuroBasket Women
Gold medal – first place	2015 Budapest	Team
European U18 Championship
Bronze medal – third place	2012 Romania	Team

Kristina Topuzović (Serbian Cyrillic: Кристина Топузовић, born 23 August 1994) is a Serbian women's basketball player who plays for Sepsi SIC of the Liga Națională. Standing at 1.83 m (6 ft 0 in), she plays at the power forward position. She also represent the Serbian national basketball team.

== Club career ==
She began playing basketball in Šabac where she stayed until 2010. She then moved to the Belgrade-based club Radivoj Korać. In summer 2016, she moved in Montenegrin Budućnost Volcano.

After two years in Podgorica, Kristina makes move back to Belgrade in October 2018, and links with Serbian powerhouse and one of the most refined women's basketball clubs in Europe, Crvena zvezda.

== International career ==
She represented Serbian national basketball team at the EuroBasket 2015 in Budapest where they won the gold medal, and qualified for the 2016 Olympics, first in the history for the Serbian team.
