= Ivanka Matić =

Serbian basketball player

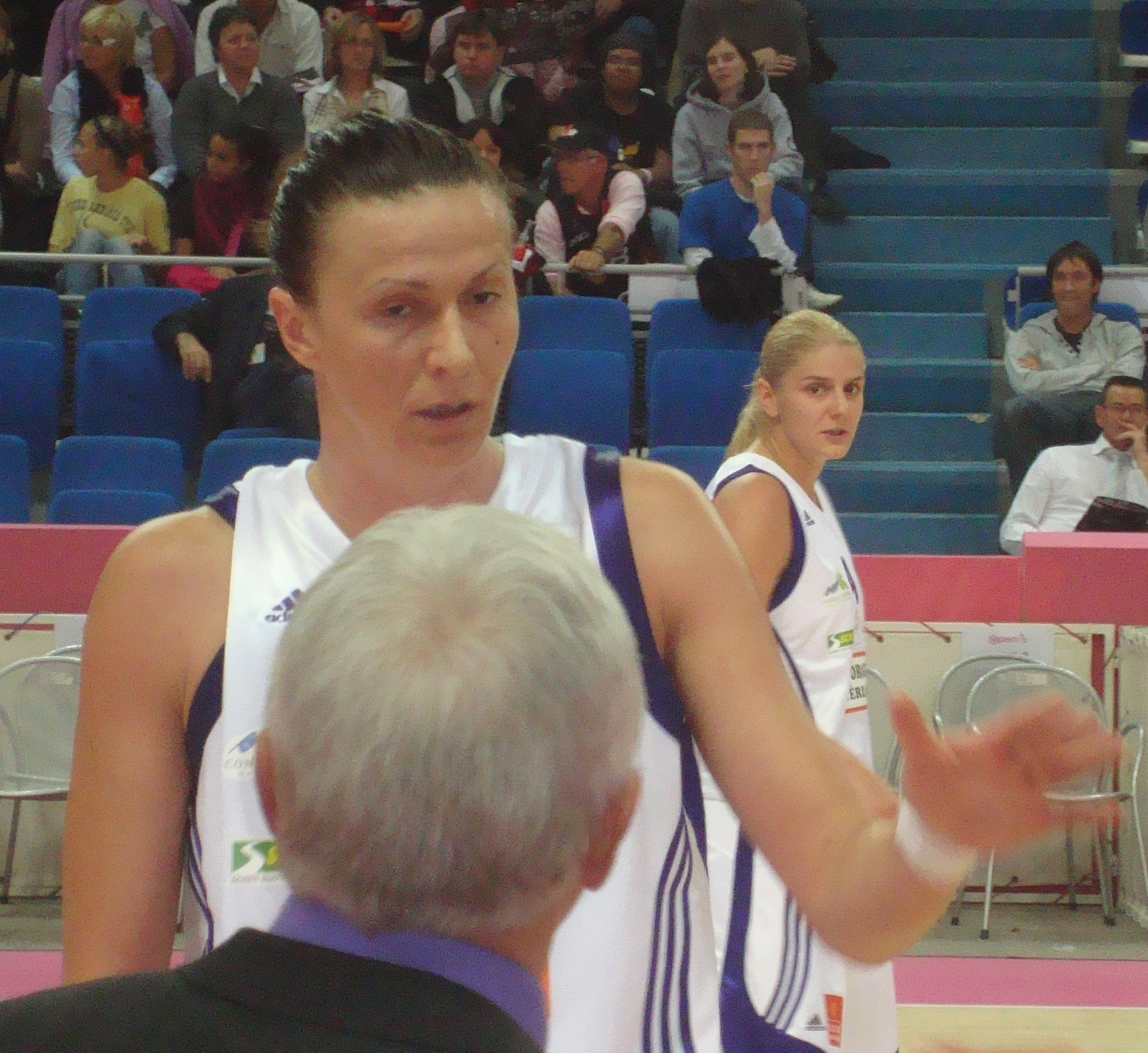

Personal information
- Born: 29 May 1979 (age 47) Vlasenica, SFR Yugoslavia
- Listed height: 1.95 m (6 ft 5 in)

Career information
- WNBA draft: 2000: undrafted
- Playing career: 1998–present
- Position: Center

Career history
- 1998–2003: Partizan
- 2003–2004: Crvena zvezda
- 2004–2005: Pays d'Aix Basket 13
- 2005–2006: USO Mondeville
- 2006–2007: Spartak Moscow
- 2007–2008: CB Avenida
- 2008–2009: USK Prague
- 2009: Crvena zvezda
- 2010: Challes-les-Eaux Basket
- 2010–2011: Tarbes Gespe Bigorre
- 2011–2012: Galatasaray
- 2012–2013: CSM Târgovişte
- 2013–2014: Crvena zvezda
- 2015: Belfius Namur
- 2015–2016: Tarbes Gespe Bigorre
- 2016–2017: Partizan
- 2017: Tarbes Gespe Bigorre
- 2017–2019: Partizan

Ivanka Matić (Serbian Cyrillic: Иванка Матић; born 29 May 1979 in Vlasenica, SFR Yugoslavia) was a Serbian professional basketball player. She played as a center. The 195cm, 6ft 5in tall Ivanka is a former member of Serbia women's national basketball team.

== Clubs ==
Seasons	Club	Country
1998–2003	Partizan	Serbia and Montenegro
2003–2004	Crvena zvezda	Serbia and Montenegro
2004–2005	Pays d'Aix Basket 13	France
2005–2006	USO Mondeville	France
2006–2007	Spartak Moscow	Russia
2007–2008	CB Avenida	Spain
2008–2009	USK Prague	Czech Republic
2009	Crvena zvezda	Serbia
2010	Challes-les-Eaux Basket	France
2010–2011	Tarbes GB	France
2011–2012	Galatasaray MP	Turkey
2012–2013	CSM Târgovişte	Romania
2013–2014	Crvena zvezda	Serbia
2015	Belfius Namur	Belgium
2015–2016	Tarbes Gespe Bigorre	France
2016–2017	Partizan	Serbia
2017	Tarbes Gespe Bigorre	France
2017–2019	Partizan	Serbia

== Honours ==
Euroleague Women

- Winner: 2006–07 with Spartak Moscow

Russia Championship

- Winner: 2007 with Spartak Moscow

Czech Republic Championship

- Winner: 2009 with USK Prague
