= Aleksandra Katanić =

Serbian basketball player

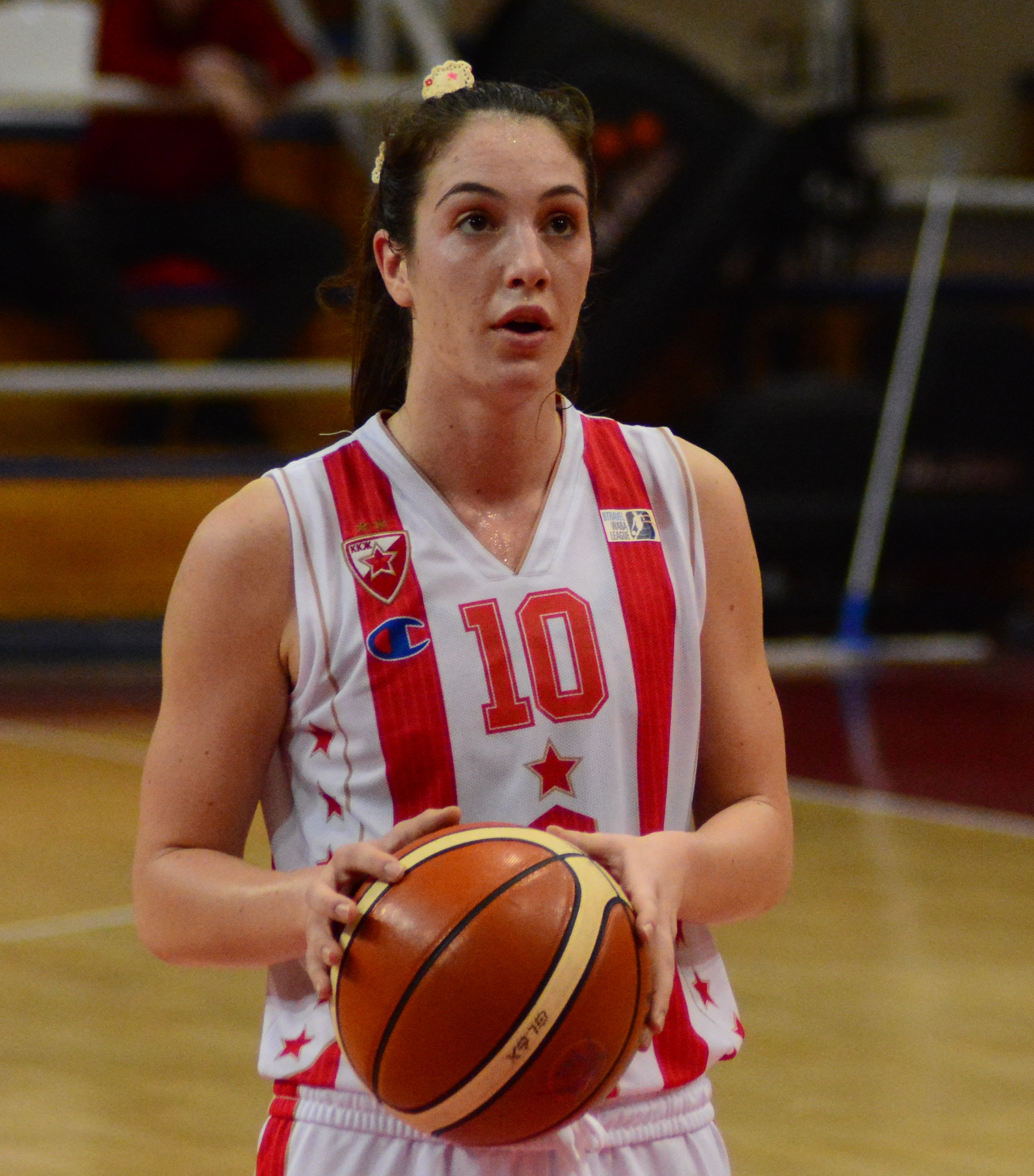

No. 10 – Crvena zvezda
- Position: Point guard
- League: Basketball League of Serbia; EuroCup Women

Personal information
- Born: 18 May 1997 (age 29) Smederevska Palanka, FR Yugoslavia
- Listed height: 1.78 m (5 ft 10 in)

Career information
- Playing career: 2012–present

Career history
- 2012—2019: Crvena zvezda
- 2019—2020: Budućnost Podgorica
- 2020—2021: Paterna
- 2021—2023: Crvena zvezda
- 2023—2024: Ormanspor
- 2024—present: Crvena zvezda

Aleksandra Katanić (born 18 May 1997) is a Serbian basketball player. She represented Serbia at the 2024 Summer Olympics.
