= Iva Slonjšak =

Croatian basketball player

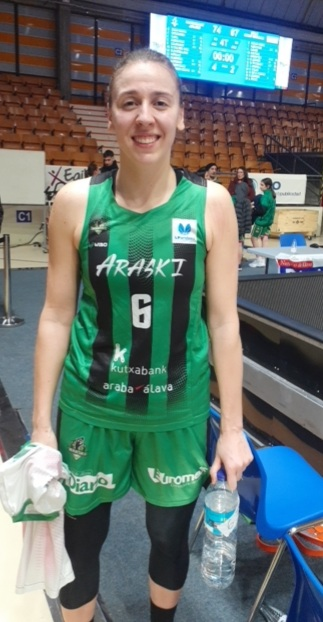

No. 16 – UFAB49
- Position: Power forward
- League: French Women's Basketball League

Personal information
- Born: 16 April 1997 (age 29) Zagreb, Croatia
- Listed height: 1.83 m (6 ft 0 in)

Career history
- 2011–2015: Trešnjevka 2009
- 2015–2018: Cinkarna Celje
- 2018–2019: Çukurova Basketbol
- 2019–2020: Elazığ İl Özel İdare
- 2020–2021: Saint Amand
- 2021-2022: Angers
- 2022–2024: Saint Amand
- 2024–present: Villeneuve d'Ascq

Iva Slonjšak (born 16 April 1997 in Zagreb) is a Croatian female professional basketball player currently playing for Saint Amand Hainaut Basketball, France. Before Cinkarna Celje she played for Trešnjevka 2009.
