= Milana Živadinović =

Serbian basketball player

No. 24 – Montana 2003
- Position: Point guard
- League: First League of Bulgaria; Adriatic League

Personal information
- Born: 17 February 1991 (age 35) Belgrade, SFR Yugoslavia
- Listed height: 173 cm (5 ft 8 in)

Career information
- WNBA draft: 2013: undrafted
- Playing career: 2006–present

Career history
- 2006–2009: Radivoj Korać
- 2009–2010: Crvena zvezda
- 2010–2012: Vojvodina
- 2012: Mladi Krajišnik
- 2013: Šumadija Kragujevac
- 2013–2014: Danzio Timișoara
- 2014–2016: Kvarner
- 2016–2017: Partizan
- 2017–present: Montana 2003

Milana Živadinović (Serbian Cyrillic: Милана Живадиновић, born 17 February 1991 in Belgrade, SFR Yugoslavia) is a Serbian professional basketball player. She currently play for Montana 2003 in First League of Bulgaria and Adriatic League. Before Montana 2003 she played for Radivoj Korać, Crvena zvezda, Vojvodina, Mladi Krajišnik, Šumadija Kragujevac, Danzio Timișoara, Kvarner and Partizan.
