= 2024–25 Basketball Championship of Bosnia and Herzegovina (women) =

Women's basketball league in Bosnia and Herzegovina

Basketball Championship of Bosnia and Herzegovina
- Season: 2024–25
- Dates: Regular season: 12 October 2024 – 19 April 2025; Play Offs: 26 April –14 May 2025
- Teams: 12

Regular season
- Season MVP: (United States) Safiyyah Lee

Finals
- Champions: Orlovi (4th title)
- Runners-up: Lavovi Brčko
- Finals MVP: (United States) Safiyyah Lee

Statistical leaders
Points	(Bosnia and Herzegovina) Natasa Sobot	30.1
Rebounds	(Bosnia and Herzegovina) Jovana Milakovic	15.0
Assists	(Serbia) Marina Ristic	6.7
Steals	(Bosnia and Herzegovina) Valentina Dosic	3.2
Blocks	(Bosnia and Herzegovina) Azra Niksic (Bosnia and Herzegovina) Adna Razic	1.4

The 2024–25 Basketball Championship of Bosnia and Herzegovina is the 23rd season of the top division women's basketball league in Bosnia and Herzegovina since its establishment in 2002. It starts in October 2024 with the first round of the regular season and ends in May 2025.

Orlovi are the defending champions.

Orlovi won their fourth title after beating Lavovi Brčko in the final.

== Format ==
Each team plays each other twice. The top four teams qualify for the play offs. The semifinals are played as a best of three series while the final is played as a best of five series.

== Regular season ==
Pos	Team	Pld	W	L	PF	PA	PD	Pts	Qualification
1	Orlovi	22	22	0	1922	1183	+739	44	Play Offs
2	Lavovi Brčko	22	17	5	1691	1193	+498	39	Play Offs
3	Play Off Sarajevo	22	16	6	1610	1387	+223	38	Play Offs
4	Čelik Zenica	22	15	7	1646	1483	+163	37	Play Offs
5	Jumper Zenica	22	14	8	1716	1549	+167	36	
6	RMU Banovići	22	13	9	1538	1544	−6	35	
7	Leotar	22	12	10	1640	1563	+77	34	
8	Mladi Krajišnik	22	7	15	1344	1555	−211	29	
9	Jedinstvo Tuzla	22	6	16	1348	1576	−228	28	
10	Konjic	22	5	17	1414	1678	−264	27 (Note: Konjic 141–135 Kozara)	
11	Kozara	22	5	17	1376	1705	−329	27	
12	Feniks	22	0	22	990	1819	−829	22	

Source: Basketball Championship of Bosnia and Herzegovina
Rules for classification: 1) Points; 2) Points difference; 3) Points scored.

== Play offs ==
Semifinals	Final
1	Orlovi	83	88	2
4	Čelik Zenica	59	70	0
1	Orlovi	72	76	81	3
2	Lavovi Brčko	54	59	48	0
2	Lavovi Brčko	72	69	70	2
3	Play Off Sarajevo	48	71	41	1

Champions of Bosnia and Herzegovina

Orlovi
Fourth title
