= 2022–23 WABA League =

WABA League
- Season: 2022–23
- Duration: October 11, 2022 – December 28, 2022 (Regular season); January 11, 2023 – March 21, 2023 (SuperLeague); 25–26 March 2023 (Final Four)
- Games played: 86
- Teams: 11

Finals
- Champions: (Slovenia) Cinkarna Celje (4th title)
- Runners-up: (Montenegro) Budućnost Bemax
- Semifinalists: (Serbia) Vojvodina 021 (Bulgaria) Montana 2003
- Finals MVP: (Slovenia) Čeh
- All statistics correct as of August 10, 2023.

The 2022–23 WABA League is the 22nd season of the Adriatic League. Competition included eleven teams from six countries. In this season participating clubs from Serbia, Montenegro, Bosnia and Herzegovina, Bulgaria, Croatia and Slovenia.

24 September 2022 Play Off Sarajevo (Bosnia and Herzegovina) has withdraws from the 2022–23 WABA League. As per the Official Basketball Rules, all games were awarded to their respective opponents with a score of 20-0. Furthermore, the forfeiting team Play Off Sarajevo will receive 0 classification points in the standings.

== Teams ==
=== Team allocation ===
Regular season
(Bulgaria) Montana 2003	(Montenegro) Nikšić	(Bosnia and Herzegovina) Orlovi	(Bosnia and Herzegovina) RMU Banovići
(Slovenia) Cinkarna Celje	(Montenegro) Budućnost Bemax	(Bosnia and Herzegovina) Lavovi Brčko	(Bosnia and Herzegovina) Play Off Sarajevo
(Croatia) Zagreb	(Serbia) Vojvodina 021	(Serbia) Duga Šabac	

=== Venues and locations ===
Location of teams in the 2021–22 WABA League
Location of teams in the 2021–22 WABA League

Team	Home city	Arena	Capacity
Budućnost Bemax	Podgorica	Bemax Arena	2,500
Cinkarna Celje	Celje	Gimnazija Center Celje Hall	1,500
Duga Šabac	Šabac	Šabac Gymnasium Hall	
Lavovi Brčko	Brčko	Brčko Technical School	
Montana 2003	Montana	Mladost Sports Hall	
Nikšić	Nikšić	Sports center Nikšić	
Orlovi	Banja Luka	Obilićevo Hall	600
Play Off	Sarajevo	Skenderija	5,616
RMU Banovići	Banovići	SKC Banovići	
Vojvodina 021	Novi Sad	Petrovaradin Hall	900
Zagreb	Zagreb	Boško Božić Pepsi	2,500

== Regular season ==
In the Regular season was played with 11 teams divided into 2 groups of 5/6 teams and play a dual circuit system, each with one game each at home and away. The four best teams in each group at the end of the regular season were placed in the SuperLeague. The regular season began on 11 October 2022 and it will end on 28 December 2022.

=== Group A ===
Pos	Team	Pld	W	L	PF	PA	PD	Pts	Qualification or relegation
1	(Montenegro) Budućnost Bemax	10	10	0	698	467	+231	20	Advance to SuperLeague
2	(Bulgaria) Montana 2003	10	7	3	666	554	+112	17	Advance to SuperLeague
3	(Serbia) Duga Šabac	10	6	4	619	557	+62	16	Advance to SuperLeague
4	(Croatia) Zagreb	10	4	6	522	574	−52	14	Advance to SuperLeague
5	(Bosnia and Herzegovina) RMU Banovići	10	3	7	534	687	−153	13	
6	(Bosnia and Herzegovina) Play Off Sarajevo	10	0	10	0	200	−200	10	

Updated to match(es) played on December 21, 2022. Source: WABA League

=== Group B ===
Pos	Team	Pld	W	L	PF	PA	PD	Pts	Qualification or relegation
1	(Slovenia) Cinkarna Celje	8	7	1	820	402	+418	15	Advance to SuperLeague
2	(Serbia) Vojvodina 021	8	7	1	662	415	+247	15	Advance to SuperLeague
3	(Bosnia and Herzegovina) Orlovi	8	4	4	508	611	−103	12	Advance to SuperLeague
4	(Bosnia and Herzegovina) Lavovi Brčko	8	1	7	399	612	−213	9	Advance to SuperLeague
5	(Montenegro) Nikšić	8	1	7	428	777	−349	9	

Updated to match(es) played on December 28, 2022. Source: WABA League

== SuperLeague ==
In the SuperLeague was played with 8 teams and play a dual circuit system, each with one game each at home and away. The four best teams in SuperLeague at the end of the last round were placed on the Final Four. The SuperLeague began on 11 January 2023 and it will end on 21 March 2023.

Pos	Team	Pld	W	L	PF	PA	PD	Pts	Qualification or relegation
1	(Montenegro) Budućnost Bemax	14	13	1	1123	760	+363	27	Advance to the Final Four
2	(Slovenia) Cinkarna Celje	14	12	2	1227	782	+445	26	Advance to the Final Four
3	(Serbia) Vojvodina 021	14	10	4	904	754	+150	24	Advance to the Final Four
4	(Bulgaria) Montana 2003	14	7	7	942	948	−6	21	Advance to the Final Four
5	(Bosnia and Herzegovina) Orlovi	14	5	9	865	1151	−286	19	
6	(Serbia) Duga Šabac	14	4	10	910	1040	−130	18	
7	(Croatia) Zagreb	14	4	10	850	996	−146	18	
8	(Bosnia and Herzegovina) Lavovi Brčko	14	1	13	702	1092	−390	15	

Updated to match(es) played on March 21, 2023. Source: WABA League

== Final Four ==
Final Four was held on 25–26 March 2023 in Podgorica, Montenegro.

Semifinals
25 March 2023
1 (Montenegro) Budućnost Bemax	73
4 (Bulgaria) Montana 2003	57
25 March 2023
2 (Slovenia) Cinkarna Celje	86
3 (Serbia) Vojvodina 021	57

Final
26 March 2023
1 (Montenegro) Budućnost Bemax	64
2 (Slovenia) Cinkarna Celje	66
Third place
26 March 2023
4 (Bulgaria) Montana 2003	56
3 (Serbia) Vojvodina 021	64

2022–23 Adriatic League champion

Cinkarna Celje
4th title

== Awards ==
- Finals MVP: Blaža Čeh (181-PG-2003) of (Slovenia) Cinkarna Celje
- Player of the Year: Dragana Živković (183-SG-2001) of (Montenegro) Budućnost Bemax
- Guard of the Year: Blaža Čeh (181-PG-2003) of (Slovenia) Cinkarna Celje
- Forward of Year: Dragana Živković (183-SG-2001) of (Montenegro) Budućnost Bemax
- Defensive Player of Year: Maruša Seničar (187-SF-1997) of (Slovenia) Cinkarna Celje
- Newcomer of the Year: Jelena Lazarević (185-PF-2005) of (Bosnia and Herzegovina) Lavovi
- Most Improved Player of Year: Lana Marić (190-F-2006) of (Serbia) Vojvodina 021
- Coach of the Year: Damir Grgić of (Slovenia) Cinkarna Celje

1st Team

- Blaža Čeh (181-PG-2003) of (Slovenia) Cinkarna Celje
- Zorana Radonjić (173-G-2002) of (Montenegro) Budućnost Bemax
- Dragana Živković (183-SG-2001) of (Montenegro) Budućnost Bemax
- Maruša Seničar (187-SF-1997) of (Slovenia) Cinkarna Celje
- Sara Loomis (188-PF-1997) of (Serbia) Vojvodina 021

2nd Team

- Marina Ristić (168-G-1987) of (Bosnia and Herzegovina) Orlovi
- Sharenika McNeill (168-PG-1999) of (Serbia) Vojvodina 021
- Marta Ostojić (185-G-2003) of (Croatia) Zagreb
- Lea Miletić (184-F-1995) of (Croatia) Zagreb
- Lana Marić (190-F-2006) of (Serbia) Vojvodina 021

Honorable Mention

- Mojca Jelenc (200-C-2003) of (Slovenia) Cinkarna Celje
- Anja Mitrašinović (2005) of (Serbia) Vršac
- Žaklina Janković (190-C/F-1994) of (Serbia) Vojvodina 021
- Olga Stepanović (180-F-1994) of (Serbia) Duga Šabac
- Courtney Cleveland (178-F-1998) of (Serbia) Duga Šabac

All-Defensive Team

- Zorana Radonjić (173-G-2002) of (Montenegro) Budućnost Bemax
- Blaža Čeh (181-PG-2003) of (Slovenia) Cinkarna Celje
- Lea Miletić (184-F-1995) of (Croatia) Zagreb
- Maruša Seničar (187-SF-1997) of (Slovenia) Cinkarna Celje
- Lana Marić (190-F-2006) of (Serbia) Vojvodina 021

All-Newcomers Team

- Valeria Aleksieva (166-G-2000) of (Bulgaria) Montana 2003
- Helena Kovačević (174-PG-2003) of (Serbia) Duga Šabac
- Viktorija Ćurić (185-F-2001) of (Croatia) Zagreb
- Jelena Lazarević (185-PF-2005) of (Bosnia and Herzegovina) Lavovi
- Hana Predojević (183-C-2007) of (Bosnia and Herzegovina) Lavovi

== See also ==
- 2022–23 ABA League First Division
- 2022–23 First Women's Basketball League of Serbia
