= Jelena Jovanović (basketball) =

Serbian basketball player

No. 32 – Crvena zvezda
- Position: Forward
- League: Basketball League of Serbia

Personal information
- Born: May 5, 1990 (age 36) Belgrade, SFR Yugoslavia
- Listed height: 1.84 m (6 ft 0 in)

Career information
- WNBA draft: 2012: undrafted
- Playing career: 2005–present

Career history
- 2005–2014: Radivoj Korać
- 2014–2015: Partizan
- 2015: Čelik Zenica
- 2015–2016: Neftochimic 2010 Burgas
- 2016: Budućnost Bemax
- 2016–2017: Zamarat
- 2017–2018: Crvena zvezda
- 2018–2019: Phoenix Constanța
- 2019–2021: Etzella
- 2021–present: Crvena zvezda

Career highlights
- 4× Serbian League champion (2014, 2017, 2018, 2022); 3× Serbian Cup winner (2014, 2017, 2022); Adriatic League champion (2014); Bosnian League champion (2015); Bosnian Cup winner (2015)
Medals
Women's basketball
Representing Serbia
Mediterranean Games
Silver medal – second place	2009 Pescara	Team
European U18 Championship
Gold medal – first place	2007 Serbia	Team

Jelena Jovanović (Serbian Cyrillic: Јелена Јовановић, born May 5, 1990) is a Serbian women's basketball player.
