= 2022–23 WABA League Group A =

Group A of the WABA League is due to take place between 12 October 2022 and 21 December 2022. The four best ranked teams will advance to the SuperLeague.

24 September 2022 Play Off Sarajevo (Bosnia and Herzegovina) has withdraws from the 2022–23 WABA League. As per the Official Basketball Rules, all games were awarded to their respective opponents with a score of 20-0. Furthermore, the forfeiting team Play Off Sarajevo will receive 0 classification points in the standings.

== Standings ==
Pos	Team	Pld	W	L	PF	PA	PD	Pts	Qualification or relegation
1	(Montenegro) Budućnost Bemax	10	10	0	698	467	+231	20	Advance to SuperLeague
2	(Bulgaria) Montana 2003	10	7	3	666	554	+112	17	Advance to SuperLeague
3	(Serbia) Duga Šabac	10	6	4	619	557	+62	16	Advance to SuperLeague
4	(Croatia) Zagreb	10	4	6	522	574	−52	14	Advance to SuperLeague
5	(Bosnia and Herzegovina) RMU Banovići	10	3	7	534	687	−153	13	
6	(Bosnia and Herzegovina) Play Off Sarajevo	10	0	10	0	200	−200	10	

Updated to match(es) played on December 21, 2022. Source: WABA League

== Fixtures and results ==
All times given below are in Central European Time (for the match played in Bulgaria is time expressed in Eastern European Time).

=== Game 1 ===
12 October 2022

Report

Play Off Sarajevo	0–20	Montana 2003

Skenderija, Sarajevo

17 November 2022
18:00

Report

Budućnost Bemax	79–55	Duga Šabac
Scoring by quarter: 12:13, 26:13, 24:12, 17:17
Pts: Živković 19; Rebs: Stefanović 11; Asts: Živković 10		Pts: Stepanović 25; Rebs: Stanković 7 Asts: Škundrić 5

Bemax Arena, Podgorica
Attendance: 50
Referees: Kovačević, Šutalo, Mario Jurković

12 October 2022
17:45

Report

RMU Banovići	63–53	Zagreb
Scoring by quarter: 14:12, 23:11, 11:15, 15:15
Pts: Dragićević 17; Rebs: Dragićević 9 Asts: Ikanović 5		Pts: Miletić 15; Rebs: Maršić 16; Asts: Miletić 4

SKC Banovići, Banovići
Attendance: 50
Referees: Bogojević, Petar Kral, Marija Ćirić

=== Game 2 ===
19 October 2022
18:00

Report

Montana 2003	91–68	Zagreb
Scoring by quarter: 16:14, 19:16, 29:20, 27:18
Pts: Reid 33; Rebs: Reid 17; Asts: Reid 7		Pts: Miletić 33; Rebs: Sekulić, Miletić 8 Asts: Sekulić 5

Mladost, Montana
Attendance: 300
Referees: Petković, Kovačević, Marčetić

19 October 2022
20:30

Report

Duga Šabac	96–64	RMU Banovići
Scoring by quarter: 24:21, 24:17, 20:22, 28:14
Pts: Stepanović 25; Rebs: Stepanović, Cleveland 10; Asts: Cleveland 6		Pts: Dunham 33; Rebs: Dunham 6 Asts: Dragićević 5

Šabac Gymnasium Hall, Šabac
Attendance: 100
Referees: K. Holjevac, Lipovac, B. Holjevac

19 October 2022

Report

Play Off Sarajevo	0–20	Budućnost Bemax

Skenderija, Sarajevo

=== Game 3 ===
26 October 2022
18:00

Report

Budućnost Bemax	78–66	Montana 2003
Scoring by quarter: 20:14, 22:14, 17:26, 19:12
Pts: Leković 21; Rebs: Živković 8 Asts: Leković 7		Pts: Reid 19; Rebs: Reid 11; Asts: Nikolova 3

Bemax Arena, Podgorica
Attendance: 300
Referees: Radanović, Komar, Kovačević

26 October 2022

Report

RMU Banovići	20–0	Play Off Sarajevo

SKC Banovići, Banovići

26 October 2022
17:30

Report

Zagreb	62–67	Duga Šabac
Scoring by quarter: 12:19, 20:21, 9:15, 21:12
Pts: Miletić, Marsić 15; Rebs: Miletić 7 Asts: Vogrinc 6		Pts: Stepanović 25; Rebs: Cleveland 9 Asts: Stepanović 3

Boško Božić Pepsi, Zagreb
Attendance: 20
Referees: Javor, Gajšek, Pučko

=== Game 4 ===
2 November 2022
18:00

Report

Montana 2003	85–78 (OT)	Duga Šabac
Scoring by quarter: 25:16, 18:19, 12:17, 15:18, Overtime: 15:8
Pts: Reid 35; Rebs: Hart 24; Asts: Aleksieva 4		Pts: Cleveland 20; Rebs: three players 7 Asts: Stepanović, Škundrić 6

Mladost Hall, Montana
Attendance: 400
Referees: Pelja, Bajgorić, Hasić

2 November 2022

Report

Play Off Sarajevo	0–20	Zagreb

Skenderija, Sarajevo

1 November 2022
18:00

Report

Budućnost Bemax	86–60	RMU Banovići
Scoring by quarter: 17:21, 28:7, 17:19, 24:13
Pts: Leković 18; Rebs: Stefanović 10; Asts: Leković 6		Pts: Dunham, Dragićević 18; Rebs: Ikanović, Nurkić 6 Asts: Dragićević 4

Bemax Arena, Podgorica
Attendance: 500
Referees: Dimovski, Jolović, Petronijević

=== Game 5 ===
9 November 2022
18:00

Report

RMU Banovići	62–91	Montana 2003
Scoring by quarter: 17:19, 18:24, 14:27, 13:21
Pts: Ikanović 15; Rebs: Nurkić 7 Asts: Dragićević 7		Pts: Reid 37; Rebs: Petrova, Reid 12; Asts: Reid 6

SKC Banovići, Banovići
Attendance: 300
Referees: Petković, Kovačević, Marčetić

9 November 2022
17:30

Report

Zagreb	50–101	Budućnost Bemax
Scoring by quarter: 11:27, 15:22, 14:24, 10:28
Pts: Miletić 12; Rebs: Miletić 5 Asts: Ostojić, Miletić 3		Pts: Drobnjak 16; Rebs: Radonjić, Živković 5 Asts: Baošić 7

Boško Božić Pepsi, Zagreb
Attendance: 200
Referees: Majkić, Gajšek, Pučko

9 November 2022

Report

Duga Šabac	20–0	Play Off Sarajevo

Šabac Gymnasium Hall, Šabac

=== Game 6 ===
16 November 2022

Report

Montana 2003	20–0	Play Off Sarajevo

Mladost Hall, Montana

12 October 2022
20:30

Report

Duga Šabac	63–77	Budućnost Bemax
Scoring by quarter: 13:21, 23:18, 13:19, 14:19
Pts: Stepanović 17; Rebs: Ivkov 7 Asts: Stepanović 8		Pts: Leković 18; Rebs: Zivković, Marković 7 Asts: Leković 6

Šabac Gymnasium Hall, Šabac
Attendance: 100
Referees: Pelja, Bajgorić, Hasić

16 November 2022
17:30

Report

Zagreb	74–38	RMU Banovići
Scoring by quarter: 14:13, 16:4, 20:14, 24:7
Pts: Sekulić 18; Rebs: Jurić 10; Asts: Miletić 5		Pts: Dunham 17; Rebs: Dunham 9 Asts: Dunham, Dragićević 2

Boško Božić Pepsi, Zagreb
Attendance: 50
Referees: Majkić, Gajšek, Oprckal

=== Game 7 ===
30 November 2022
17:30

Report

Zagreb	61–57	Montana 2003
Scoring by quarter: 8:13, 17:16, 18:12, 18:16
Pts: Curić 16; Rebs: Jurić, Miletić 9 Asts: Ostojić, Miletić 4		Pts: Reid 23; Rebs: Reid 11; Asts: Vasileva 4

Boško Božić Pepsi, Zagreb
Attendance: 30
Referees: Skenderija, Srdić, Dojčinović

30 November 2022
19:00

Report

RMU Banovići	56–77	Duga Šabac
Scoring by quarter: 11:9, 19:20, 13:27, 13:21
Pts: Dunham 23; Rebs: Dunham, Lačić 9 Asts: Kahvedžić 5		Pts: Kovačević 17; Rebs: Stepanović 8 Asts: Kovačević 6

SKC Banovići, Banovići
Attendance: 150
Referees: Grubišić, Barišić, Andrić

30 November 2022

Report

Budućnost Bemax	20–0	Play Off Sarajevo

Bemax Arena, Podgorica

=== Game 8 ===
7 December 2022
18:00

Report

Montana 2003	56–77	Budućnost Bemax
Scoring by quarter: 12:25, 17:30, 12:12, 15:10
Pts: Hart 16; Rebs: Reid 12; Asts: Reid 4		Pts: Živković 26; Rebs: Živković 8 Asts: Živković 7

Mladost Hall, Montana
Attendance: 200
Referees: Petković, Dimovski, Kovačević

7 December 2022

Report

Play Off Sarajevo	0–20	RMU Banovići

Skenderija, Sarajevo

6 December 2022
20:30

Report

Duga Šabac	89–62	Zagreb
Scoring by quarter: 25:17, 26:25, 16:9, 22:11
Pts: Cleveland 23; Rebs: Stepanović 13; Asts: Škundrić 5		Pts: Miletić 15; Rebs: Miletić 7 Asts: Jakšić 4

Šabac Gymnasium Hall, Šabac
Attendance: 100
Referees: Nikšć, Kadrić, Fočo

=== Game 9 ===
13 December 2022
20:30

Report

Duga Šabac	54–62	Montana 2003
Scoring by quarter: 12:14, 19:10, 14:21, 9:17
Pts: Jelić 16; Rebs: Jelić 12; Asts: Škundrić 4		Pts: Reid 17; Rebs: Reid 16; Asts: Mitrašinović, Reid 4

Šabac Gymnasium Hall, Šabac
Attendance: 100
Referees: Hartman, Holjevac, Lipovac

14 December 2022

Report

Zagreb	20–0	Play Off Sarajevo

Boško Božić Pepsi, Zagreb

12 December 2022
19:00

Report

RMU Banovići	65–92	Budućnost Bemax
Scoring by quarter: 6:29, 20:26, 21:20, 18:17
Pts: Lačić 17; Rebs: Dunham 6 Asts: Nurkić 5		Pts: Drobnjak 22; Rebs: Stefanović 9 Asts: Živković 5

SKC Banovići, Banovići
Attendance: 150
Referees: Miloradović, Bogojević, Kral

=== Game 10 ===
21 December 2022
18:00

Report

Montana 2003	118–76	RMU Banovići
Scoring by quarter: 30:22, 30:17, 34:21, 24:16
Pts: Aleksieva 23; Rebs: Reid 12; Asts: Mitrašinović 9		Pts: Dunham 21; Rebs: Dragićević 6 Asts: Dragićević 7

Mladost Hall, Montana
Attendance: 100
Referees: Dimovski, Kovačević, Ilić

21 December 2022
18:00

Report

Budućnost Bemax	68–52	Zagreb
Scoring by quarter: 17:19, 17:14, 17:12, 17:7
Pts: Radonjić 18; Rebs: Šćepanović 8 Asts: Živković 5		Pts: Miletić 18; Rebs: Miletić 12; Asts: Ostojić 4

Bemax Arena, Podgorica
Attendance: 100

21 December 2022

Report

Play Off Sarajevo	0–20	Duga Šabac

Skenderija, Sarajevo
