= 2017–18 WABA League – Classification 9–12 =

Classification 9–12 of the Adriatic League took place between 28 February 2018 and it will end on 14 March 2018.

== Ninth place game ==
Team #1	Agg.	Team #2	1st leg	2nd leg
Play Off Ultra (Bosnia and Herzegovina)	163:150	(Serbia) Kraljevo	70:62	93:88

=== Game 1 ===
7 March 2018
16:00

Report

Play Off Ultra	70–62	Kraljevo
Scoring by quarter: 22:14, 15:13, 8:16, 25:19
Pts: Marković 22; Rebs: Marković 10; Asts: Ćato 7		Pts: Nikolić 21; Rebs: Stefanović 7 Asts: Katić 6

Sports centre R, Sarajevo
Attendance: n / a
Referees: K. Radinović, I. Radinović, Orbović

=== Game 2 ===
28 February 2018
17:00

Report

Kraljevo	88–93	Play Off Ultra
Scoring by quarter: 23:16, 31:17, 18:37, 16:23
Pts: Nikolić 24; Rebs: Ali BraShey 9 Asts: Bajić 10		Pts: Marković 30; Rebs: Marković 13; Asts: Ćato 13

Kraljevo Sports Hall, Kraljevo
Attendance: 50
Referees: Popović, Vujičić, Lakićević

== Eleventh place game ==
Team #1	Agg.	Team #2	1st leg	2nd leg
İstanbul Üniversitesi (Turkey)	100:135	(Croatia) Ragusa Dubrovnik	49:67	51:68

=== Game 1 ===
6 March 2018
16:00

Report

İstanbul Üniversitesi	49–67	Ragusa Dubrovnik
Scoring by quarter: 22:17, 6:20, 12:14, 9:16
Pts: Sönmez 13; Rebs: Büyükbayrak 6 Asts: Cora 4		Pts: Stojanović 17; Rebs: Matijević 10; Asts: Kalajžić 6

Prof. Dr. Turgay Atasü Spor Salonu, Istanbul
Attendance: n / a
Referees: Lazov, Zlatevski, Stojčevski

=== Game 2 ===
14 March 2018
16:30

Report

Ragusa Dubrovnik	68–51	İstanbul Üniversitesi
Pts: Stojanović 18; Rebs: Matijević 10; Asts: three players 3		Pts: Zeybek 14; Rebs: Topaloglu 6 Asts: Topaloglu 3

Gospino polje, Dubrovnik
Attendance: n / a
Referees: K. Radinović, I. Radinović, Orbović

== Notes ==
- All times given below are in Central European Time (for the match played in Turkey is time expressed in Further-eastern European Time).
