= 2022–23 WABA League Group B =

Group B of the WABA League is due to take place between 11 October 2022 and 28 December 2022. The four best ranked teams will advance to the SuperLeague.

== Standings ==
Pos	Team	Pld	W	L	PF	PA	PD	Pts	Qualification or relegation
1	(Slovenia) Cinkarna Celje	8	7	1	820	402	+418	15	Advance to SuperLeague
2	(Serbia) Vojvodina 021	8	7	1	662	415	+247	15	Advance to SuperLeague
3	(Bosnia and Herzegovina) Orlovi	8	4	4	508	611	−103	12	Advance to SuperLeague
4	(Bosnia and Herzegovina) Lavovi Brčko	8	1	7	399	612	−213	9	Advance to SuperLeague
5	(Montenegro) Nikšić	8	1	7	428	777	−349	9	

Updated to match(es) played on December 28, 2022. Source: WABA League

== Fixtures and results ==
All times given below are in Central European Time.

=== Game 1 ===
11 October 2022
16:30

Report

Vojvodina 021	82–30	Lavovi Brčko
Scoring by quarter: 26:10, 25:3, 21:7, 10:10
Pts: McNeill 18; Rebs: Selaković 10; Asts: Radulović 6		Pts: Halilović 7 Rebs: Lazarević 9 Asts: Halilović 3

Petrovaradin Hall, Novi Sad
Attendance: 100
Referees: Hartman, Andrić, Kupanovac

12 October 2022
16:30

Report

Nikšić	64–81	Orlovi
Scoring by quarter: 16:19, 13:25, 21:13, 14:24
Pts: Sarić 19; Rebs: Sarić 11; Asts: Daci 5		Pts: Tadić 21; Rebs: Tadić 8 Asts: Ristić, Kondić 3

Sports center Nikšić, Nikšić
Attendance: /
Referees: Dimovski, Jolović, Ilić

=== Game 2 ===
20 October 2022
17:00

Report

Lavovi Brčko	50–58	Nikšić
Scoring by quarter: 14:14, 11:10, 12:21, 13:13
Pts: Halilović 15; Rebs: Lazarević 8 Asts: Došić 3		Pts: Čanović 17; Rebs: Lalović 21; Asts: Šarić 4

Brčko Technical School, Brčko
Attendance: /
Referees: Vlahović, Bogojević, Kostić

19 October 2022
19:00

Report

Cinkarna Celje	68–44	Vojvodina 021
Scoring by quarter: 17:11, 20:14, 11:7, 20:12
Pts: Loomis 14; Rebs: Loomis 10; Asts: Blaža Čeh 4		Pts: McNeill 18; Rebs: Marić 7 Asts: McNeill 3

Hall Gimnazija Center Celje, Celje
Attendance: 150
Referees: Terlević, Stanković, Zagar

=== Game 3 ===
26 October 2022
16:30

Report

Nikšić	42–135	Cinkarna Celje
Scoring by quarter: 8:34, 9:29, 14:33, 11:39
Pts: Sarić 14; Rebs: Sarić 9 Asts: Sarić 4		Pts: Simmons 22; Rebs: žLoomis 8 Asts: Čeh 7

Sports center Nikšić, Nikšić
Attendance: 10
Referees: Kajan, Šutalo, Jurković

26 October 2022
18:00

Report

Orlovi	73–56	Lavovi Brčko
Scoring by quarter: 20:9, 16:13, 19:19, 18:15
Pts: Predojević 20; Rebs: Predojević 10; Asts: Ristić 8		Pts: Đokić 16; Rebs: Lazarević 10; Asts: Halilović, Savić 4

Obilićevo Hall, Banja Luka
Attendance: 100
Referees: Nikšic, Kadrić, Fočo

=== Game 4 ===
2 November 2022
19:00

Report

Cinkarna Celje	115–52	Orlovi
Scoring by quarter: 28:10, 31:12, 26:15, 30:15
Pts: Jelenc 18; Rebs: Gbemuotor 11; Asts: Čeh 6		Pts: Šipka 15; Rebs: Šipka 14; Asts: Mitrović, Radulović 3

Hall Gimnazija Center Celje, Celje
Attendance: 50
Referees: Pavičić, Copić, Čićin Šain

2 November 2022
16:30

Report

Vojvodina 021	105–39	Nikšić
Scoring by quarter: 21:8, 30:8, 26:8, 28:15
Pts: McNeill 17; Rebs: Marić 16; Asts: Stojić 8		Pts: Lalović 8 Rebs: Daci 8 Asts: Čanović 3

Petrovaradin Hall, Novi Sad
Attendance: 30
Referees: Hartman, Andrić, Kupanovac

=== Game 5 ===
9 November 2022
18:00

Report

Orlovi	60–79	Vojvodina 021
Scoring by quarter: 24:23, 10:22, 18:20, 8:14
Pts: Ristić 14; Rebs: Šipka 5 Asts: Ristić 8		Pts: McNeill 23; Rebs: Marić 14; Asts: Radulović 9

Obilićevo Hall, Banja Luka
Attendance: 100
Referees: Stanković, Galić, Pavičić

10 November 2022
19:00

Report

Lavovi Brčko	45–96	Cinkarna Celje
Scoring by quarter: 9:32, 14:30, 18:20, 4:14
Pts: Lazarević 12; Rebs: Lazarević 8 Asts: Đokić 4		Pts: Debeljak 17; Rebs: Jelenc 6 Asts: Gbemuotor, Simmons 4

Brčko Technical School, Brčko
Attendance: 100
Referees: Bogojević, Tomić, Ćirić

=== Game 6 ===
17 November 2022
19:00

Report

Lavovi Brčko	48–72	Vojvodina 021
Scoring by quarter: 10:22, 13:15, 17:19, 8:16
Pts: Lazarević 12; Rebs: Lazarević 7 Asts: Đokić 5		Pts: Selaković 18; Rebs: Janković 9 Asts: Radulović 7

Brčko Technical School, Brčko
Attendance: 100
Referees: Hartman, Barišić, Andrić

16 November 2022
18:00

Report

Orlovi	78–62	Nikšić
Scoring by quarter: 26:8, 21:22, 16:20, 15:12
Pts: Radulović, Kondić 13; Rebs: Predojević, Kondić 10; Asts: Mitrović, Radulović 5		Pts: Sarić 23; Rebs: Čanović, Sarić 12; Asts: Čanović, Petrović 5

Obilićevo Hall, Banja Luka
Attendance: 100
Referees: Holjevac, Grubišić, Lipovac

=== Game 7 ===
30 November 2022
20:30

Report

Nikšić	68–79	Lavovi Brčko
Scoring by quarter: 25:12, 17:24, 14:18, 12:25
Pts: Sarić 20; Rebs: Daci 16; Asts: Jakšić 6		Pts: Halilović 25; Rebs: Lazarević 12; Asts: Halilović 7

Sports center Nikšić, Nikšić
Attendance: 100
Referees: Kovačević, Jolović, Ilić

30 November 2022
16:30

Report

Vojvodina 021	70–68	Cinkarna Celje
Scoring by quarter: 12:20, 23:13, 20:12, 15:23
Pts: McNeill 31; Rebs: Marić 11; Asts: Radulović 4		Pts: Loomis 25; Rebs: Loomis 7 Asts: Čeh, Seničar 5

Petrovaradin Hall, Novi Sad
Attendance: 30
Referees: Bajgorić, Hasić, Jurić

=== Game 8 ===
7 December 2022
19:00

Report

Cinkarna Celje	131–47	Nikšić
Scoring by quarter: 35:16, 35:6, 33:12, 28:13
Pts: Debeljak 26; Rebs: Seničar 12; Asts: Čeh 9		Pts: Jakšić 19; Rebs: Čanović 7 Asts: Čanović 6

Hall Gimnazija Center Celje, Celje
Attendance: 100
Referees: Copić, Lučin, Tadić

7 December 2022
19:00

Report

Lavovi Brčko	44–55	Orlovi
Scoring by quarter: 6:12, 12:11, 17:13, 9:19
Pts: Savić 11; Rebs: Karišik 8 Asts: Đokić 4		Pts: Kondić 21; Rebs: Ristić, Kondić 7 Asts: Ristić 4

Brčko Technical School, Brčko
Attendance: 50
Referees: Nožinović, Avdagić, Jusufović

=== Game 9 ===
14 December 2022
18:00

Report

Orlovi	55–99	Cinkarna Celje
Scoring by quarter: 13:30, 13:21, 11:23, 18:25
Pts: Ristić 22; Rebs: Ristić 8 Asts: Mitrović 3		Pts: Loomis 25; Rebs: Loomis 10; Asts: Čeh 10

Obilićevo Hall, Banja Luka
Attendance: 100
Referees: Kruljac, Čićin Šain, Capan

28 December 2022
15:00

Report

Nikšić	48–118	Vojvodina 021
Scoring by quarter: 7:29, 12:25, 23:27, 6:37
Pts: Jakšić 20; Rebs: Lalović 8 Asts: Lalović 4		Pts: McNeill 28; Rebs: three players 9 Asts: McNeill 7

Sports center Nikšić, Nikšić
Attendance: 10
Referees: Radanović, Komar, Kovačević

=== Game 10 ===
22 December 2022
21:00

Report

Vojvodina 021	95–54	Orlovi
Scoring by quarter: 29:14, 21:10, 22:16, 20:14
Pts: Selaković 15; Rebs: Marić 14; Asts: Marić 5		Pts: Ristić 11; Rebs: Šipka 8 Asts: Kondić 4

Petrovaradin Hall, Novi Sad
Attendance: 100
Referees: Hartman, Andrić, Buhin

21 December 2022
18:00

Report

Cinkarna Celje	108–47	Lavovi Brčko
Scoring by quarter: 31:10, 24:10, 29:18, 24:9
Pts: Žibert 19; Rebs: Debeljak, Loomis 6 Asts: Čeh 10		Pts: Đokić, Karišik 11; Rebs: Karišik 7 Asts: Đokić 5

Hall Gimnazija Center Celje, Celje
Attendance: 100
Referees: Kelava, Stivičić, Štampalija
