= Žakula =

Žakula (Serbian Cyrillic: Жакула) is a surname. Notable people with the surname include:

- Dragoslava Žakula (born 1973), Yugoslav basketball player
- Nikola Žakula (born 1992), Serbian footballer
- Srđan Žakula (born 1979), Serbian footballer
