= Mersada Bećirspahić =

Yugoslav basketball player

Personal information
- Born: 8 December 1957 (age 68) Bihać, PR Bosnia and Herzegovina, FPR Yugoslavia
- Listed height: 1.85 m (6 ft 1 in)
- Listed weight: 75 kg (165 lb)

Career information
- Playing career: 1973–19??
- Position: Center

Career history
- 1973–1974: Bihać
- 1985 - 1987 Harouys Nantes -Nat 1: Mladi Krajišnik
- 1987 - 1988. AS Villeurbanne - Nat 1 1988 - 1989. Challes les Eaux - Nat 1 1989 - 1991. Genève Bernex - Nat 1 ( CH ): Željezničar Sarajevo
Medals
Women's basketball
Representing Yugoslavia
Bronze medal – third place	1980 Moskva	Team competition

Mersada Bećirspahić (born 8 December 1957) is a former basketball player who competed for Yugoslavia in the 1980 Summer Olympics.
