= Biljana Pavićević (basketballer) =

Montenegrin basketball player

Personal information
- Born: 17 June 1980 (age 46) Nikšić, SFR Yugoslavia
- Listed height: 1.91 m (6 ft 3 in)

Career information
- WNBA draft: 2002: undrafted
- Position: Power forward

Career history
- 2004–2005: Vojvodina
- 2005–2006: Miskolc
- 2006–2008: AEL Limassol
- 2008: Livourne
- 2009: Jedinstvo Bijelo Polje
- 2009: AEL Limassol
- 2010: Mladi Krajišnik
- 2010: Minsk
- 2011: Tarbes
- 2011: Budućnost Podgorica
- 2011–2012: Dexia Namur
- Keravnos Strovolou
- Čelik Zenica
- Montana 2003
- 2016–2017: AEL Limassol
- 2017–present: Reims Basket

Biljana Pavićević (Serbian Cyrillic: Биљана Павићевић; born 17 June 1980) is a Montenegrin women's basketball player. She played for the French team Tarbes Gespe Bigorre.
