= Durga Dharmadhikari =

Basketball player from India

Bristol Academy Flyers
- Position: Shooting guard
- League: WBBL Division One

Personal information
- Born: July 24, 2000 (age 26) Pune, Maharashtra, India
- Listed height: 5 ft 6 in (1.68 m)

Career information
- College: Local university, United Kingdom
- Playing career: 2022–present

Career history
- 2022–2023: Maharashtra
- 2022: Pune Panthers (3x3)
- 2024–: Bristol Academy Flyers

Durga Dharmadhikari (born 24 July 2000) is an Indian basketball player from Maharashtra. She plays as a shooting guard for the Bristol Academy Flyers in United Kingdom.

== Career ==
She began with the local club, Deccan Gymkhana in Pune and also played for the Maharashtra state team in 2022–23, before moving to England for higher studies. She played for Pune Panthers in the 3x3 professional basketball league in 2022 under the aegis of Basketball Federation of India and FIBA Asia.

As a student of a local university in the United Kingdom, she plays for Bristol, a women's basketball team in British Women's National Basketball League Division One. As of 2025, she is usually in the starting five, along with Leila Jepson, Samantha Roscoe, Oliva Jokonya, Marlee Ball and Veronica Iweanya.
