= ŽKK Livno =

- Leagues: Bosnian Second League
- Founded: 1984; 41 years ago
- Location: Livno, Bosnia and Herzegovina
- Team colors: Blue and White
- Website: zkklivno.com

Ženski košarkaški klub Livno commonly abbreviated as ŽKK Livno or simply Livno is a women's basketball club from Livno, Bosnia and Herzegovina.

== History ==
The club was founded in 1984 as ŽKK Troglav.

== Honours ==
=== Domestic ===
National competitions – 0

- Basketball Championship of Bosnia and Herzegovina:
  - Runners-up (2) : 1999, 2003

Competitions of Herzeg-Bosnia (2nd-tier) – 4

- League of Herzeg-Bosnia
  - Winners(1): 2000
- Cup of Herzeg-Bosnia
  - Winners(4): 1998, 1999, 2000, 2003
