= Basketball Cup of Bosnia and Herzegovina (women) =

National women's basketball cup

Basketball Cup of Bosnia and Herzegovina (Women)
- Sport: Basketball
- Founded: 2002
- No. of teams: 8
- Country: Bosnia and Herzegovina (1993–present)
- Continent: FIBA Europe (Europe)
- Most recent champion: Orlovi (1st title)
- Most titles: Željezničar Sarajevo (7th title)

The Basketball Cup of Bosnia and Herzegovina is the national women's basketball cup of Bosnia and Herzegovina. It has been played since 2002.

== Cup winners ==
- Official list confirmed by FIBA for all Bosnia and Herzegovina

Season	Winner	Result	Runner-up
1993–94			
1994–95			
1995–96			
1996–97			
1997–98	SAB Željezničar		
1998–99	Željezničar New Time		
1999–00			
2000–01	Port Mladi Krajišnik		
2001–02	Bijeljina		
2002–03	Željezničar Sarajevo		
2003–04	Željezničar CO		
2004–05	Željezničar CO		
2005–06	Željezničar Sarajevo	99:64	Čelik Zenica
2006–07	Željezničar Sarajevo	79:64	Spars Sarajevo
2007–08	Mladi Krajišnik	88:74	Željezničar Sarajevo
2008–09	Mladi Krajišnik	80:71	Željezničar Sarajevo
2009–10	Jedinstvo BH Telecom		
2010–11	Čelik Zenica		Jedinstvo BH Telecom
2011–12	Čelik Zenica	76:66	Mladi Krajišnik
2012–13	Mladi Krajišnik	66:50	Sloboda Novi Grad
2013–14	Čelik Zenica	86:55	Brčanka
2014–15	Čelik Zenica	76:72	Jedinstvo Tuzla
2015–16	Čelik Zenica	76:61	Play Off Happy
2016–17	Play Off Ultra	75:72	Čelik Zenica
2017–18	RMU Banovići	71:65	Play Off Ultra
2018–19	RMU Banovići	83:67	Orlovia
2019–20	RMU Banovići	86:56	Čelik Zenica
2020–21	Orlovi	79:70	RMU Banovići

=== Champions of regional cups ===
- Official list confirmed by FIBA for national regional cups before 2002/03

==== Cup of KSBiH ====
Season	Winner	Runner-up
1992–93	Not held	
1993–94	.	.
1994–95	Cenex Sarajevo	.
1995–96	BH Osiguranje Sarajevo	.
1996–97	BH Osiguranje Sarajevo	.
1997–98	SAB Željezničar	.
1998–99	Željezničar New Time	.
1999–00	Željezničar New Time	.
2000–01	Željezničar New Time	.
2001–02	Jedinstvo Tuzla	.

==== Cup of Republika Srpska ====
Season	Winner	Runner-up
1992–93	Not held	
1993–94	Port Mladi Krajišnik	.
1994–95	Port Mladi Krajišnik	.
1995–96	Port Mladi Krajišnik	.
1996–97	Port Mladi Krajišnik	.
1997–98	Port Mladi Krajišnik	.
1998–99	Port Mladi Krajišnik	.
1999–00	Port Mladi Krajišnik	.
2000–01	Port Mladi Krajišnik	.
2001–02	Bijeljina	.

==== Cup League of Herzeg-Bosnia ====
Season	Winner	Runner-up
1992–93	Not held	
1993–94	Not held	
1994–95	.	.
1995–96	.	.
1996–97	.	.
1997–98	Sirela mljekara	.
1998–99	Sirela mljekara	.
1999–00	Sirela mljekara	.
2000–01	Zrinjski Mostar	.
2001–02	Županjac Tomislavgrad	.
2002–03	Troglav Livno	.

== Performance by club ==
- Including titles in SFR Yugoslavia and Bosnia and Herzegovina

Team	Winners	Runners-up	Years Won	Years Runner-up
Željezničar Sarajevo	7	4	1998, 1999, 2003, 2004, 2005, 2006, 2007	1973, 1992, 2008, 2009
Čelik Zenica	5	3	2011, 2012, 2014, 2015, 2016	2006, 2017, 2020
Mladi Krajišnik	4	1	2001, 2008, 2009, 2013	2012
Jedinstvo Tuzla	3	2	1988, 1991, 2010	2011, 2015
RMU Banovići	3	1	2018, 2019, 2020	2021
Bosna Sarajevo	2	–	1977, 1983	–
Play Off Sarajevo	1	2	2017	2016, 2018
Orlovi	1	1	2021	2019
Bijeljina	1	–	2002	–
Spars Sarajevo	–	1	–	2007
Sloboda Novi Grad	–	1	–	2013
Brčanka	–	1	–	2014
