= 2024–25 WABA League =

European women's basketball tournament

WABA League
- The final four was held in Celje, Slovenia.
- Season: 2024–25
- Dates: Regular season: 2 October 2024 – 12 March 2025; Final four: 29–30 March 2025
- Teams: Total: 9 (from 6 countries)

Finals
- Champions: (Montenegro) Budućnost Bemax (4th title)
- Runners-up: (Slovenia) Cinkarna Celje
- Third place: (Bulgaria) Montana 2003
- Fourth place: (Bulgaria) Beroe
- Finals MVP: (United States) Kiana Johnson (Regular season) (Montenegro) Zorana Radonjić (Final four)

Statistical leaders
- Points: (United States) Kiana Johnson (303 points)
- Rebounds: (United States) Sarah Boothe (143 rebounds)
- Assists: (United States) Kiana Johnson (112 assists)

Records
- Biggest home win: Budućnost Bemax 105–51 Studio Zagreb (19 January 2025); Cinkarna Celje 108–54 Studio Zagreb (12 March 2025)
- Biggest away win: Studio Zagreb 59–115 Cinkarna Celje (11 December 2024)
- Highest scoring: Studio Zagreb 59–115 Cinkarna Celje (11 December 2024)

The 2024–25 WABA League is the 24th season of this competition for the top women's teams in the Adriatic region.

Cinkarna Celje are the three-time defending champions.

Budućnost Bemax won their fourth title with a win over Cinkarna Celje in the final.

== Format ==
For the first time since 2020–21, teams were placed into one group rather than two. The nine teams all played in a double round robin system where the top four advance to the final four to decide the champions.

== Teams ==
Location of teams in the 2024–25 WABA League
Location of teams in the 2024–25 WABA League

The labels in the parentheses show how each team qualified for the place of its starting round:

- 1st, 2nd, 3rd, etc.: League position of the previous season

Regular season
| (Bosnia and Herzegovina) Orlovi (1st) | (Bulgaria) Beroe (1st) | (Bulgaria) Montana 2003 (2nd) |
| (Croatia) Trešnjevka 2009 (2nd) | (Croatia) Zadar Plus (Note: On 11 September 2024, Zadar Plus replaced Croatian champions, Ragusa, who withdrew before the tournament started.) (10th) | (Croatia) Studio Zagreb (11th) |
| (Montenegro) Budućnost Bemax (1st) | (Serbia) Partizan 1953 (3rd) | (Slovenia) Cinkarna Celje (1st) |

== Regular season ==
| Pos | Team | Pld | W | L | PF | PA | PD | Pts | Qualification | CEL | BUD | MON | BER | TRE | PAR | ORL | ZAG | ZAD |
|---|---|---|---|---|---|---|---|---|---|---|---|---|---|---|---|---|---|---|
| 1 | (Slovenia) Cinkarna Celje | 16 | 15 | 1 | 1272 | 872 | +400 | 31 | Final four | — | 76–67 | 75–51 | 104–77 | 79–63 | 99–60 | 115–69 | 108–54 | ~~113–63~~ |
| 2 | (Montenegro) Budućnost Bemax | 16 | 14 | 2 | 1161 | 832 | +329 | 30 | Final four | 71–64 | — | 75–68 | 85–42 | 81–56 | 85–48 | 88–56 | 105–51 | 20–0 |
| 3 | (Bulgaria) Montana 2003 | 16 | 11 | 5 | 1071 | 970 | +101 | 27 (Note: Montana 2003 153–146 Beroe) | Final four | 57–77 | 60–75 | — | 77–63 | 88–72 | 77–62 | 77–73 | 77–59 | ~~84–63~~ |
| 4 | (Bulgaria) Beroe | 16 | 11 | 5 | 1080 | 991 | +89 | 27 | Final four | 72–86 | 69–64 | 83–76 | — | 81–71 | 79–58 | 93–58 | 74–54 | 20–0 |
| 5 | (Croatia) Trešnjevka 2009 | 16 | 7 | 9 | 1042 | 1032 | +10 | 23 | | 54–78 | 53–63 | 67–81 | 80–76 | — | 85–56 | 83–72 | 101–57 | ~~80–74~~ |
| 6 | (Serbia) Partizan 1953 | 16 | 5 | 11 | 963 | 1081 | −118 | 21 (Note: Partizan 2–0 Orlovi) | | 64–68 | 61–78 | 69–82 | 51–75 | 60–69 | — | 82–75 | 85–64 | ~~67–65~~ |
| 7 | (Bosnia and Herzegovina) Orlovi | 16 | 5 | 11 | 1031 | 1202 | −171 | 21 | | 54–88 | 69–81 | 54–80 | 76–91 | 80–71 | 72–99 | — | 100–78 | ~~96–65~~ |
| 8 | (Croatia) Studio Zagreb | 16 | 4 | 12 | 923 | 1243 | −320 | 20 | | 59–115 | 59–105 | 66–80 | 53–65 | 80–77 | 73–68 | 76–83 | — | 20–0 |
| 9 | (Croatia) Zadar Plus (Note: On 20 January 2025, Zadar Plus withdrew due to financial resasons. All games involving Zadar Plus will be given as a forfeit loss to the other team.) | 16 | 0 | 16 | 0 | 320 | −320 | 16 | Withdrew | 0–20 | ~~60–75~~ | ~~50–88~~ | 0–20 | 0–20 | 0–20 | ~~72–59~~ | ~~86–63~~ | — |

Source: WABA
Rules for classification: 1) Points; 2) Points difference; 3) Points scored.

== Final four ==
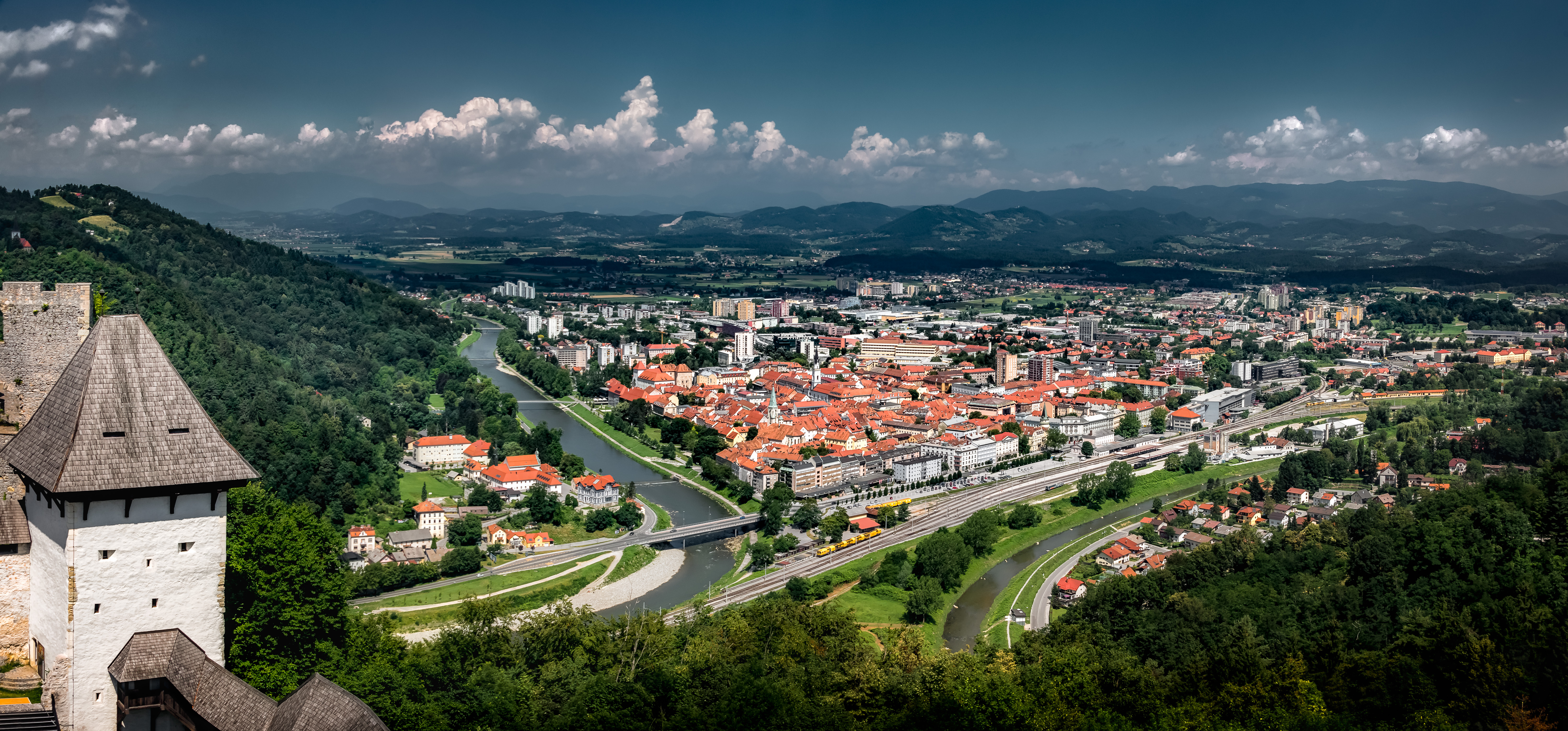
The Gimnazija Celje in Celje hosted the final four.

On 3 March 2025, the final four hosting rights were given to Cinkarna Celje, who was the only club to apply for the final four. The event was held at the Gimnazija Celje in Celje, Slovenia. The president of Slovenia, Nataša Pirc Musar, is an honorary patron for the final four.

=== Bracket ===
Semifinals
(Slovenia) Cinkarna Celje | 76
(Bulgaria) Beroe | 61
(Montenegro) Budućnost Bemax | 83
(Bulgaria) Montana 2003 | 78

Final
(Slovenia) Cinkarna Celje | 64
(Montenegro) Budućnost Bemax | 71
Third place
(Bulgaria) Beroe | 63
(Bulgaria) Montana 2003 | 73

=== Semifinals ===
29 March 2025
15:30

Boxscore

| Budućnost Bemax (Montenegro) | 83–78 | (Bulgaria) Montana 2003 |
Scoring by quarter: 24–25, 19–17, 22–20, 18–20
| Pts: Radonjic 20; Rebs: Amundsen 9 Asts: Briggs, Savković 5 | | Pts: Johnson 31; Rebs: Boothe 8 Asts: Johnson 7 |

Gimnazija Celje, Celje
Attendance: 150

29 March 2025
18:00

Boxscore

| Cinkarna Celje (Slovenia) | 76–61 | (Bulgaria) Beroe |
Scoring by quarter: 27–18, 18–14, 11–15, 20–14
| Pts: Soares 23; Rebs: Silva 7 Asts: Bartelme 6 | | Pts: Hristova, Theriot 15; Rebs: Mujovic, Naumova 5 Asts: Theriot 4 |

Gimnazija Celje, Celje
Attendance: 400

=== Third place game ===
30 March 2025
14:30

Boxscore

| Montana 2003 (Bulgaria) | 73–63 | (Bulgaria) Beroe |
Scoring by quarter: 19–14, 23–10, 23–19, 8–20
| Pts: Boothe, Wallen 21; Rebs: Wallen 10; Asts: Wallen 8 | | Pts: Moura 21; Rebs: Moura 12; Asts: Theriot 7 |

Gimnazija Celje, Celje
Attendance: 50
Referees: Dusan Marcetic, Nemanja Krivokuca, Dimitrije Karanovic

=== Final ===
30 March 2025
17:00

Boxscore

| Cinkarna Celje (Slovenia) | 64–71 | (Montenegro) Budućnost Bemax |
Scoring by quarter: 23–22, 10–18, 15–9, 16–22
| Pts: Soares 17; Rebs: Soares 8 Asts: Baric, Bartelme 4 | | Pts: Radonjic 21; Rebs: Savković 7 Asts: Radonjic 4 |

Gimnazija Celje, Celje
Attendance: 1,000
Referees: Gordan Terlevic, Romana Stojanovic, Dzenan Hasic

2024–25 WABA League Champions

Budućnost Bemax
Fourth title

== Awards ==
=== WABA League MVP ===
| Player | Team | Ref. |
|---|---|---|
| (United States) Kiana Johnson | (Bulgaria) Montana 2003 | |

=== WABA League Final Four MVP ===
| Player | Team | Ref. |
|---|---|---|
| (Montenegro) Zorana Radonjić | (Montenegro) Budućnost Bemax | |

=== WABA League Final Four All Star Team ===
| PG | SG | SF | PF | C |
|---|---|---|---|---|
| (Montenegro) Zorana Radonjić ( (Montenegro) Budućnost Bemax) | (Montenegro) Jovana Savković ( (Montenegro) Budućnost Bemax) | (Slovenia) Lea Bartelme ( (Slovenia) Cinkarna Celje) | (Brazil) Leticia Soares ( (Slovenia) Cinkarna Celje) | (United States) Kiana Johnson ( (Bulgaria) Montana 2003) |

== See also ==
- 2024–25 WABA League 2
