= Olga Đoković =

Yugoslavian basketball player

Personal information
- Born: January 8, 1945 (age 81) Sarajevo, SFR Yugoslavia

Career information
- Playing career: 1960–19??

Career history
- 1960–1963: Bosna
- 1963–197?: Željezničar Sarajevo
- KUK
- ASM
- Clermont UC
Medals
Women's basketball
Representing Yugoslavia
EuroBasket
Silver medal – second place	1968 Messina
Bronze medal – third place	1970 Rotterdam

Olga Đoković (born 8 January 1945 in Sarajevo, SFR Yugoslavia) is a Yugoslavian former female basketball player.
