= Samantha Roscoe =

Australian basketball player (born 1995)

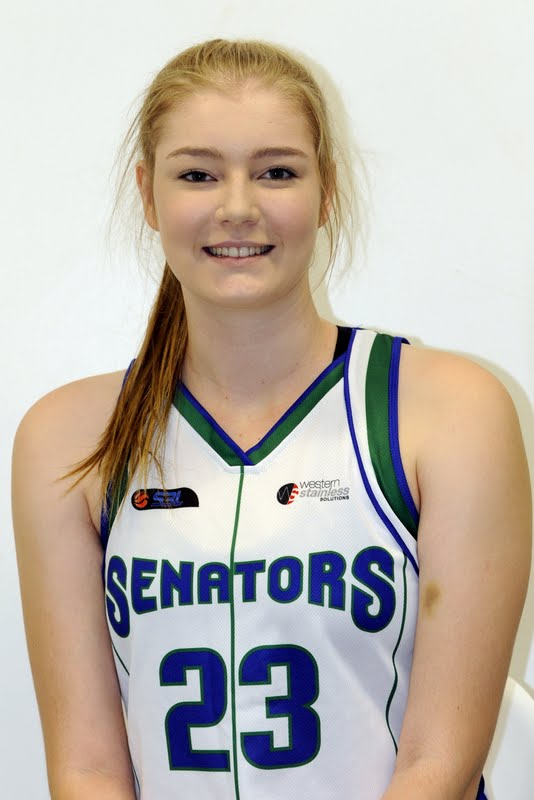
- Roscoe with the Stirling Senators in 2013

No. 12 – Lakeside Lightning
- Position: Power forward / center
- League: NBL1 West

Personal information
- Born: 23 October 1995 (age 31) Perth, Western Australia, Australia
- Listed height: 194 cm (6 ft 4 in)

Career information
- High school: Newman College (Perth, Western Australia)
- College: North Dakota (2013–2017)
- WNBA draft: 2017: undrafted
- Playing career: 2011–present

Career history
- 2011–2013: Stirling Senators
- 2017–2018: Lakeside Lightning
- 2017–2020: Manchester Mystics
- 2019: Warwick Senators
- 2020–2021: BG 74 Göttingen
- 2021: Kalamunda Eastern Suns
- 2021–2022: TK Hannover
- 2022: ZKK Play Off
- 2022: Warwick Senators
- 2022–2023: TK Hannover
- 2023: Kalamunda Eastern Suns
- 2023–2024: Caledonia Gladiators
- 2024: Mandurah Magic
- 2024–2025: Bristol Flyers
- 2026–present: Lakeside Lightning

Career highlights
- Bosnia and Herzegovina League champion (2022); SBL champion (2018)

Samantha Issabelle Roscoe (born 23 October 1995) is an Australian-British basketball player for the Lakeside Lightning of the NBL1 West. She played college basketball in the United States for the North Dakota Fighting Hawks between 2013 and 2017 before splitting her time between Australia and Europe following college. She won an SBL championship with the Lakeside Lightning in 2018 and a championship in Bosnia in 2022.

== Early life and career ==
Roscoe was born in Perth, Western Australia. While in high school at Newman College, Roscoe was on the cusp of pursuing a modelling career. As a 16-year-old, she was scouted by international modelling agencies. She ultimately chose to pursue a basketball career.

Roscoe played as a junior for the Stirling Senators in the Western Australian Basketball League (WABL). In 2011, she debuted for the Senators in the State Basketball League (SBL). She played 55 SBL games for the Senators over three seasons. In 2012 and 2013, she was member of the West Coast Waves' development squad. She was also named as a reserve for the Under 18 National 3 on 3 team that contested the 2012 FIBA 3x3 Under-18 World Championships in Spain.

== College career ==
Roscoe moved to the United States in 2013 to play college basketball for the North Dakota Fighting Hawks. She played sparingly for the Fighting Hawks as a freshman and sophomore, averaging 3.8 minutes across 35 games between 2013 and 2015.

As a junior in 2015–16, Roscoe played in all 33 games with 24 starts, averaging 9.0 points, 4.4 rebounds, 1.3 assists and 1.0 blocks in 23.7 minutes per game. She twice scored 22 points during the season, a career high. In March 2016, she hit a buzzer beater that made the ESPN Sports Center top 10 plays of the day.

As a senior in 2016–17, Roscoe was co-captain of North Dakota's 2017 Big Sky Championship team. She averaged 10.4 points, 5.0 rebounds and 1.7 blocks in 22.4 minutes in 30 games with four starts. She scored a season-high 20 points in January 2017.

== Professional career ==
After graduating from North Dakota, Roscoe began playing in both the Australian and European winters.

She started her career with the Lakeside Lightning in the State Basketball League (SBL), where she led the league in blocks with 2.46 per game during the 2017 season. She then moved to England and played for the Manchester Mystics of the Women's British Basketball League (WBBL) in the 2017–18 season. She averaged almost 10 points and six rebounds per game in her first WBBL season.

In the 2018 SBL season, Roscoe helped the Lightning win the SBL championship. She then returned to the Mystics for the 2018–19 WBBL season and averaged 16.6 points and 8.1 rebounds per game.

In the 2019 SBL season, Roscoe helped the Warwick Senators reach the grand final. With the Mystics in the 2019–20 season, she averaged 18.5 points and 8.5 rebounds per game.

Roscoe's next stint came in Germany with BG 74 Göttingen during the 2020–21 Damen-Basketball-Bundesliga (DBBL) season, where she averaged 15.1 points and 5.6 rebounds per game. She then returned to Perth and played for the Kalamunda Eastern Suns in the 2021 NBL1 West season.

Roscoe continued in the DBBL for the 2021–22 season with TK Hannover, averaging 15 points and six rebounds per game. The team finished sixth and lost in the quarter-finals. Following the DBBL season, she helped ZKK Play Off win the Bosnia and Herzegovina League championship. She then returned to Perth and had a four-game stint with the Warwick Senators during the 2022 NBL1 West season.

Roscoe returned to TK Hannover for the 2022–23 season and was appointed team captain. She re-joined the Kalamunda Eastern Suns for the 2023 NBL1 West season.

Roscoe joined the Caledonia Gladiators for the 2023–24 WBBL season and then joined the Mandurah Magic for the 2024 NBL1 West season.

During the 2024–25 season, Roscoe played seven games for the Bristol Flyers of the English Women's Basketball League, with one game on 5 October and six between 1 February and 5 April. She went on to play four games with the Flyers between 4 October and 8 November to start the 2025–26 season.

In February 2026, Roscoe signed with the Lakeside Lightning for the 2026 NBL1 West season.

== National team career ==
In May 2019, Roscoe was named in an extended squad for the Great Britain national team. In November 2020, she made Great Britain's final squad for the EuroBasket qualifiers but did not receive any game time in their lone match.

== Personal life ==
Roscoe is the daughter of Carole and the late Gary Roscoe.

Roscoe completed her master's degree in business management at Manchester Metropolitan University.

In 2024, Roscoe moved to Bristol to settle down with her partner, fellow basketball player Raphell Thomas-Edwards. She began working for Bristol Sport. In late 2025, the couple moved back to Perth following the death of Roscoe's father.
