= WABA 2 League =

Second-tier regional women's basketball league

- Founded: 2024; 2 years ago
- First season: 2024–25
- Country: Austria; Bosnia and Herzegovina; Montenegro; North Macedonia; Serbia; Slovenia
- Confederation: FIBA Europe
- Number of teams: 9
- Level on pyramid: 2
- Current champions: (Slovenia) Ilirija (2nd title) (2025–26)
- Most championships: (Slovenia) Ilirija (2 titles)
- Website: waba-league.com
- 2026–27 season

The WABA 2 League is the second-tier women's basketball division of the WABA League system. It is a regional competition between women's clubs from six countries: Austria, Bosnia and Herzegovina, Montenegro, North Macedonia, Serbia, and Slovenia.

== History ==
WABA 2 League was established in 2024. In its first season, it included six teams from three countries (Bosnia and Herzegovina, Montenegro and Slovenia). After the regular season, the Final Four tournament was held in Maribor, where Ilirija defeated the hosts, Maribor, 76–74 to win the inaugural title. The league expanded to nine teams the following season. Ilirija successfully defended their title at the Final Four, hosted in the Croatian town of Slavonski Brod.

== Seasons ==
Season	Champions	Runners-up	Regular season winner	Champion's Coach	Finals MVP	Teams
2024–25	(Slovenia) Ilirija	(Slovenia) Maribor	(Slovenia) Ilirija	(Slovenia) Ernest Novak	(Slovenia) Sara Sambolić	6
2025–26	(Slovenia) Ilirija	(Croatia) Brod na Savi	(Croatia) Brod na Savi	(Slovenia) Ernest Novak	(Slovenia) Živa Mišjak Cujnik	9
2026–27						9

== List of clubs ==
List of all-time WABA 2 League clubs
Club	Home city	Seasons	Best result
(Croatian Basketball Federation) Brod na Savi	Slavonski Brod	2025–26	Runners-up
(Basketball Austria) BK Duchess	Klosterneuburg	2025–26	6th place
(Basketball Federation of Slovenia) Ilirija	Ljubljana	2024–25, 2025–26, 2026–27	Champions
(Basketball Federation of Slovenia) Ježica	Ljubljana	2024–25, 2025–26, 2026–27	3rd place
(Basketball Federation of Bosnia and Herzegovina) Jumper Taurus	Zenica	2024–25	5th place
(Basketball Federation of North Macedonia) Kriva Palanka	Kriva Palanka	2025–26	5th place
(Basketball Federation of Bosnia and Herzegovina) Lider	Gradiška	2026–27	
(Basketball Federation of Slovenia) Maribor	Maribor	2024–25, 2025–26, 2026–27	Runners-up
(Basketball Federation of Montenegro) Podgorica	Podgorica	2024–25, 2025–26	4th place
(Basketball Federation of Montenegro) Primorje	Herceg Novi	2026–27	
(Basketball Federation of Bosnia and Herzegovina) RMU Banovići	Banovići	2024–25, 2025–26, 2026–27	6th place
(Basketball Federation of Serbia) Rudar 1903	Bor	2026–27	
(Basketball Federation of Montenegro) Sea Stars	Tivat	2026–27	
(Basketball Austria) UBI Graz	Graz	2025–26, 2026–27	4th place
