= 2024–25 WABA 2 League =

European women's basketball tournament

WABA 2 League
- The final four was held in Maribor, Slovenia.
- Season: 2024–25
- Dates: Regular season: 28 September 2024 – 12 February 2025; Final four: 22–23 March 2025
- Teams: Total: 6 (from 3 countries)

Finals
- Champions: (Slovenia) Akson Ilirija (1st title)
- Runners-up: (Slovenia) Maribor
- Third place: (Slovenia) Bo2-mega Ježica
- Fourth place: (Montenegro) Podgorica
- Finals MVP: (Bosnia and Herzegovina) Dragana Zubac (Regular season) (Slovenia) Sara Sambolić (Final four)

Statistical leaders
- Points: (United States) Nylah Bobbie Young (216 points)
- Rebounds: (United States) Nylah Bobbie Young (98 rebounds)
- Assists: (Slovenia) Tiana Meglič Šteharnik (63 assists)

Records
- Biggest home win: Akson Ilirija 103–46 RMU Banovići (2 November 2024)
- Biggest away win: Jumper Taurus 65–110 Bo2mega Jezica (21 December 2024)
- Highest scoring: RMU Banovići 84–102 Bo2mega Jezica (12 February 2025)

The 2024–25 WABA 2 League was the inaugural season of the WABA 2 League, the second-tier regional competition beneath the WABA League. Teams from the Adriatic region were allowed to take part.

The winners were Akson Ilirija, who defeated Slovenian rivals, Maribor, in the final.

== Format ==
The six teams played in a round-robin system, with the top four advancing to the Final Four to decide the champion.

== Teams ==
Location of teams in the 2024–25 WABA 2 League

The following six teams competed in the inaugural WABA 2 League season:

Regular season
(Bosnia and Herzegovina) Jumper Taurus (3rd)
(Bosnia and Herzegovina) RMU Banovići (7th)
(Montenegro) Podgorica (2nd)
(Slovenia) Akson Ilirija (3rd)
(Slovenia) Maribor (4th)
(Slovenia) Bo2-mega Ježica (5th)

- Note: Numbers in parentheses indicate the team's domestic league position from the previous season.

== Regular season ==
Pos	Team	Pld	W	L	PF	PA	PD	Pts	Qualification	ILI	MAR	JEŽ	SCH	JUM	BAN
1	(Slovenia) Akson Ilirija	10	9	1	754	536	+218	19	Final four	—	76–68	56–63	63–47	81–34	103–46
2	(Slovenia) Maribor	10	8	2	768	634	+134	18	Final four	53–73	—	72–68	66–58	82–40	95–53
3	(Slovenia) Bo2-mega Ježica	10	6	4	785	742	+43	16	Final four	67–88	83–96	—	63–56	94–83	81–67
4	(Montenegro) Podgorica	10	5	5	637	615	+22	15	Final four	41–77	44–73	75–54	—	60–49	90–42
5	(Bosnia and Herzegovina) Jumper Taurus	10	1	9	595	777	−182	11 (Note: Jumper Taurus 128–125 RMU Banovići)		59–72	76–78	65–110	61–75	—	77–61
6	(Bosnia and Herzegovina) RMU Banovići	10	1	9	605	840	−235	11		58–65	63–85	84–102	67–91	64–51	—

Source: WABA
Legend: Blue = home team win; Red = away team win.
Rules for classification: 1) Points; 2) Points difference; 3) Points scored.

== Final four ==
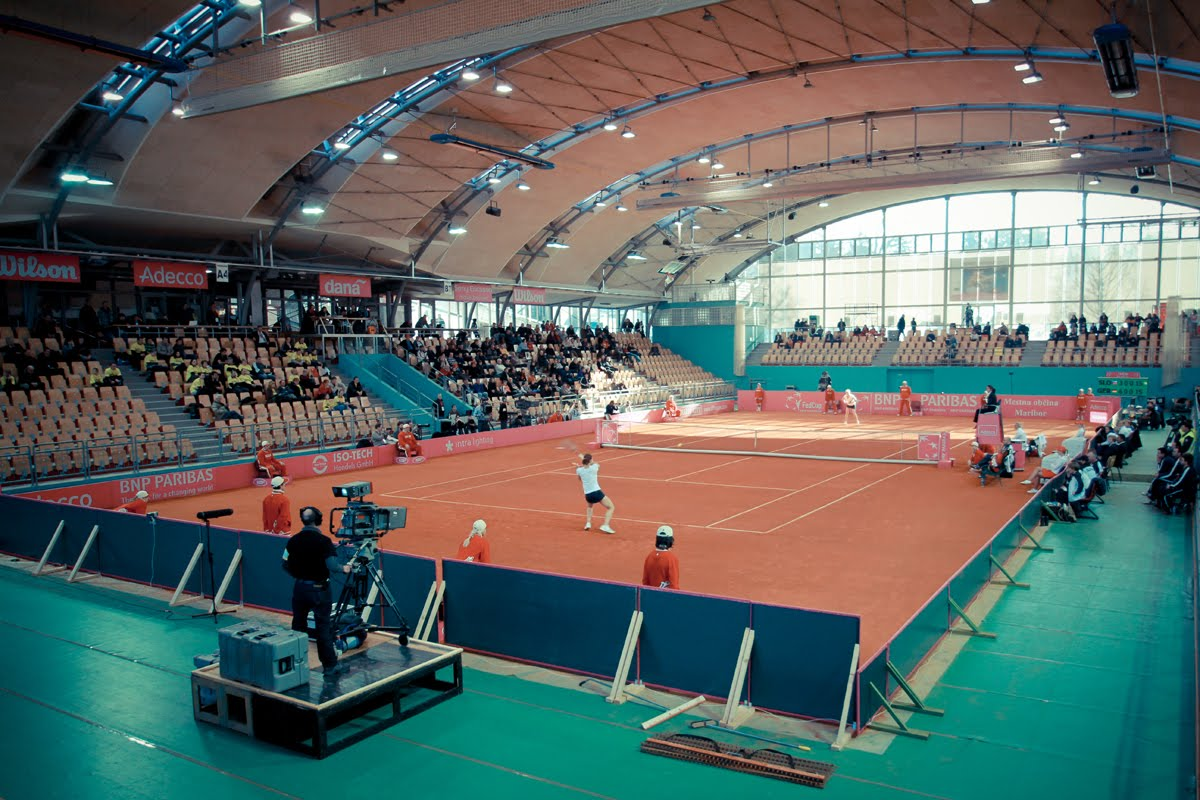
The Lukna Sports Hall in Maribor hosted the final four.

The final four was held in Maribor, Slovenia, since Maribor was the only club to submit a bid to host the final four. The venue was the Lukna Sports Hall.

=== Bracket ===
Semifinals
(Slovenia) Akson Ilirija	64
(Montenegro) Podgorica	35
(Slovenia) Maribor	79
(Slovenia) Bo2-mega Ježica	68

Final
(Slovenia) Akson Ilirija	76
(Slovenia) Maribor	74
Third place
(Montenegro) Podgorica	71
(Slovenia) Bo2-mega Ježica	72

=== Semifinals ===
22 March 2025
15:00

Boxscore

Akson Ilirija (Slovenia)	64–35	(Montenegro) Podgorica
Scoring by quarter: 19–11, 14–7, 16–11, 15–6
Pts: Guska 22; Rebs: Valančič 7 Asts: Sambolić 7		Pts: Rondović 15; Rebs: Sekulović 5 Asts: six players 1

Lukna Sports Hall, Maribor
Referees: Mateo Pavičić, Boris Hartman, Goran Rogić

22 March 2025
17:45

Boxscore

Maribor (Slovenia)	79–68	(Slovenia) Bo2-mega Ježica
Scoring by quarter: 26–11, 18–18, 19–17, 16–22
Pts: Stojko 22; Rebs: Stojko 12; Asts: Šteharnik 7		Pts: Tomšič 17; Rebs: Klep 8 Asts: Milovanova, Ovčina 3

Lukna Sports Hall, Maribor
Referees: Mateo Pavičić, Boris Hartman, Goran Rogić

=== Third place game ===
23 March 2025
14:00

Boxscore

Bo2-mega Ježica (Slovenia)	72–71	(Montenegro) Podgorica
Scoring by quarter: 11–16, 14–15, 23–20, 24–20
Pts: Ovčina 21; Rebs: Marolt, Pokleka 9 Asts: Marolt 4		Pts: Vujović 22; Rebs: Ščepanović 10; Asts: Rondović 8

Lukna Sports Hall, Maribor
Referees: Mateo Pavičić, Hrvoje Muhvić, Toni Čićin-Šain

=== Final ===
23 March 2025
16:45

Boxscore

Maribor (Slovenia)	74–76	(Slovenia) Akson Ilirija
Scoring by quarter: 21–21, 19–21, 14–17, 20–17
Pts: Grujić 19; Rebs: Grujić 8 Asts: Šteharnik 6		Pts: Sambolić 21; Rebs: Guska 14; Asts: Sambolić 6

Lukna Sports Hall, Maribor
Referees: Mateo Pavičić, Hrvoje Muhvić, Toni Čićin-Šain

2024–25 WABA 2 League Champions

Akson Ilirija
First title

== Awards ==
=== WABA 2 League MVP ===
Player	Team	Ref.
(Bosnia and Herzegovina) Dragana Zubac	(Bosnia and Herzegovina) RMU Banovići	

=== WABA 2 League Final Four MVP ===
Player	Team	Ref.
(Slovenia) Sara Sambolić	(Slovenia) Akson Ilirija	

=== WABA 2 League Final Four All-Star Team ===
PG	SG	SF	PF	C
(Montenegro) Milena Vujović ( (Montenegro) Podgorica)	(Slovenia) Tina Tomšič ( (Slovenia) Bo2-mega Ježica)	(Slovenia) Tiana Meglič Šteharnik ( (Slovenia) Maribor)	(Slovenia) Jana Guska ( (Slovenia) Akson Ilirija)	(Slovenia) Sara Sambolić ( (Slovenia) Akson Ilirija)

== See also ==
- 2024–25 WABA League
