= Newman College, Perth =

Newman College
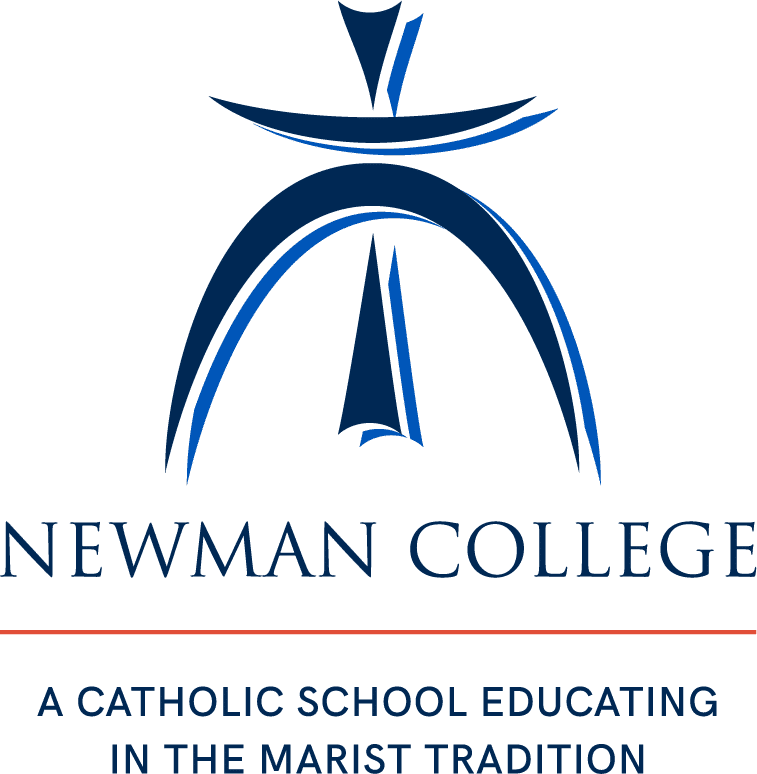

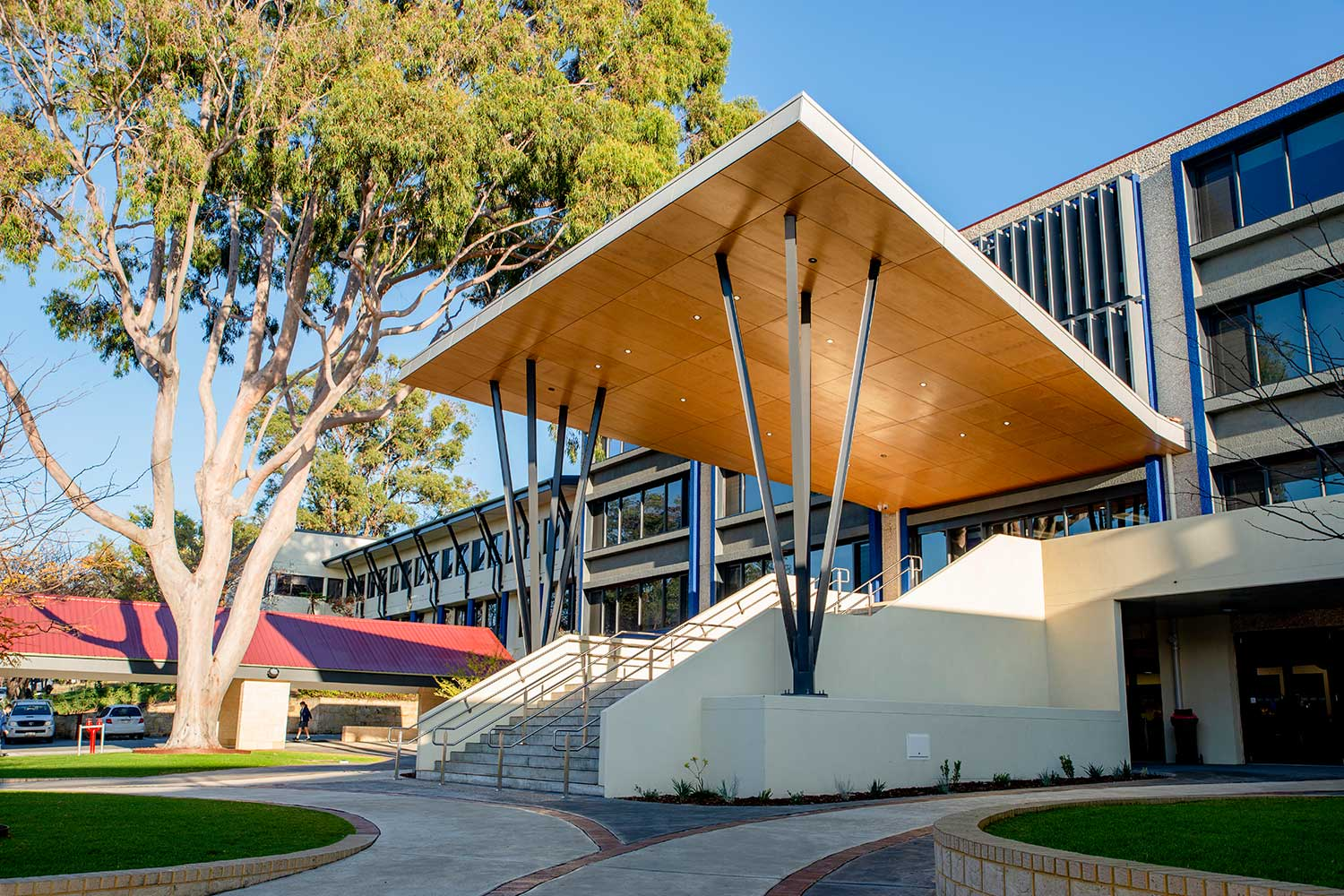
- Newman College John Henry Newman Learning Hub

Location
- Floreat and Churchlands, Western Australia; Australia; 31°55′26″S 115°47′11″E

Information
- Type: Private, catholic, co-educational primary and high school
- Motto: Shine through Discovery “Let your light shine.” — Matthew 5:16
- Denomination: Catholic
- Established: 1977
- Educational authority: Marist Schools Australia
- Principal: Andrew Watson
- Years offered: Pre-Kindergarten – Year 12
- Enrollment: ~1899
- Campuses: Lavalla Campus (PK-6) Marcellin Campus (7–12)
- Slogan: Educating in the Marist tradition
- Song: Sub tuum praesidium
- Website: newman.wa.edu.au

Newman College is a pre-K–12 co-educational Catholic school which operates in the Marist tradition in Churchlands, Western Australia. It is currently a joint governed college with the governors being the Archbishop of Perth, Timothy Costelloe, and the Provincial of the Marist Brothers of the Southern Province of Australia, Brother Paul Gilchrist. The college is a founding member of the Association of Marist Schools of Australia.

== Name ==
The college name is derived from that of the English scholar and philosopher Saint John Henry Newman (1801–1890), a man who spent half of his life an Anglican and the latter half a Catholic.

== Location ==
The college has a current enrollment of 1,900. Students are split across two campuses on the one Churchlands site: Pre-Kindergarten to Year 6 students on the Lavalla Campus, and the Year 7–12 students on the Marcellin Campus.

== Grounds and facilities ==
The Marcellin and Lavalla Campuses have a combined 4 ovals. The college's Ovals are used for both physical education classes and out-of-school activities. The John Lucas Oval is Newman College's cricket ground. The field is also utilised for hockey, soccer, and other sports. The Terrance Gleeson Oval is a full-size Australian rules football field and running track. The Lavalla Primary Oval is utilised for cricket, hockey and other sports.

The college's heated Olympic-sized swimming pool, Frank Ehlers Pool, is used for summer physical education swimming lessons and primary school swimming carnivals.

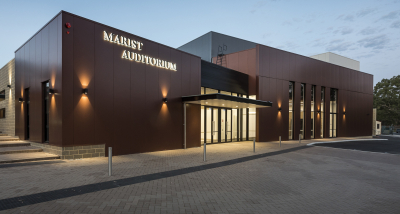
The Marist auditorium

The Marist auditorium is a 600-seat mixed used performing arts venue. The college uses the venue for exams, assemblies, and their various school productions. The college also allows the use of the venue, and venue staff to external events, usually dance recitals and seminars.

== Notable alumni ==
- Nicole Bolton – cricketer
- Matthew Connell – Australian rules footballer
- Danny Green – professional boxer
- Jesse Hogan – Australian rules footballer
- Callum Jamieson – Australian rules footballer
- Michael Johns – singer
- Justin Langer – former test cricketer
- Daniel Ricciardo – Formula One driver
- Samantha Roscoe – basketball player

== See also ==
- List of schools in the Perth metropolitan area
