= KK Rudar 1903 =

Serbian basketball club

Rudar 1903
- Leagues: Serbian League; WABA League 2
- Founded: 2008; 18 years ago
- Arena: USC "Bobana Momčilović Veličković" (capacity: 4.500)
- Location: Bor, Serbia
- Team colors: Green and Black
- Head coach: (Serbia) Dejan Jakovljević

KK Rudar Bor 1903 (Serbian Cyrillic: Кошаркашки клуб Рудар 1903, English: Basketball Club Rudar 1903) is a professional basketball club based in Bor, Serbia. They are currently competing in the Second Women's Basketball League of Serbia and WABA League 2.

== History ==
Rudar 1903 was founded in 2008 and from the very beginning developed both men's and women's basketball across all age groups. Since 2025, the club has been focused exclusively on women's teams. The club is a member of the Basketball Federation of Serbia, the Regional Basketball Federation of Eastern Serbia, and the Sports Association of the City of Bor. Since 2021, the club has competed in the Second Women's League of Serbia, the second-highest level of women's basketball in the country, while also running three younger competitive teams that play in the regional basketball federations of Eastern, Southern, and Central Serbia. The club officially has 319 licensed athletes and 6 licensed coaches, with 1 more currently in training.

It also has a sports manager and four basketball instructors working with younger age groups. Since 2026 Rudar 1903 is competing in regional WABA League 2.

== Notable Achievements ==
In the 2020/21 season, the club earned promotion to the Second Women's League, where it has remained a stable and competitive team ever since. One of the standout players has been captain Marija Cvijović — the team's leading player and the league's top scorer in the 2023/24 season, while in the 2024/25 and 2025/26 seasons she finished as the second-best scorer in the league. She was also named the second-best female athlete of the City of Bor in both 2024 and 2025.

== Current squad ==
Note: Flags indicate national team eligibility at FIBA-sanctioned events. Players may hold other non-FIBA nationalities not displayed.

Rudar 1903 roster
Players
Coaches

Pos.	No.	Nat.	Name	Ht.	Age
SG	4	(Serbia)	Cvijović, Marija	1.73 m (5 ft 8 in)	26 – 15 February 2000
PG	5	(Serbia)	Spasić, Nađa	1.70 m (5 ft 7 in)	18 – 19 November 2007
PG	6	(Serbia)	Ilić, Jana	1.73 m (5 ft 8 in)	18 – 17 January 2008
SF	7	(Bosnia and Herzegovina)	Milić, Emilija	1.74 m (5 ft 9 in)	18 – 1 January 2008
PG	8	(Serbia)	Spaić, Natalija	1.70 m (5 ft 7 in)	29 – 5 May 1997
SG	9	(Serbia)	Cvetanovski, Nina	1.70 m (5 ft 7 in)	16 – 1 January 2010
SG	10	(Serbia)	Zejak, Tijana	1.78 m (5 ft 10 in)	20 – 1 January 2006
PF	11	(Serbia)	Hadžić, Ajša	1.82 m (6 ft 0 in)	25 – 23 October 2000
C	12	(Serbia)	Radojković, Jelena	1.83 m (6 ft 0 in)	24 – 29 March 2002
C	13	(Serbia)	Petrović, Lena	1.85 m (6 ft 1 in)	15 – 1 January 2011
SG	14	(Serbia)	Veličković, Jana	1.74 m (5 ft 9 in)	22 – 12 December 2003
SF	15	(Serbia)	Antić, Iva	1.78 m (5 ft 10 in)	16 – 8 November 2009
PG	16	(Serbia)	Živadinović, Maša	1.70 m (5 ft 7 in)	15 – 9 August 2011
SG	17	(Serbia)	Rakić, Sofija	1.70 m (5 ft 7 in)	16 – 7 July 2010
PF	18	(Serbia)	Petrović, Jana	1.85 m (6 ft 1 in)	17 – 6 April 2009
C	24	(Democratic Republic of the Congo)	Ntumba, Thethe	1.88 m (6 ft 2 in)	43 – 13 September 1983

Head coach

- (Serbia) Dejan Jakovljević

Assistant coach(es)

- (Serbia) Zoran Đorić

Legend

- (C) Team captain
- Injured

- Roster
Updated: 17 September 2026

== See also ==
- List of basketball clubs in Serbia by major honours won
