= Basketball Championship of Bosnia and Herzegovina (women) =

Basketball Championship of Bosnia and Herzegovina (Women)
- Sport: Basketball
- Founded: 2002
- First season: 2002–03
- No. of teams: 11
- Country: Bosnia and Herzegovina
- Continent: FIBA Europe (Europe)
- Most recent champion: Play Off Sarajevo (3rd title)
- Most titles: Željezničar Sarajevo (14 titles)
- Level on pyramid: 1
- Domestic cup: Cup of Bosnia and Herzegovina

The Basketball Championship of Bosnia and Herzegovina is the highest women's professional club basketball competition in Bosnia and Herzegovina. The League it was founded in 2002.

== History ==
The Basketball League of Bosnia and Herzegovina has only existed since 2002. Until then there were three separate associations that each organized their own separate competitions.

== Current teams ==
Team	City
Čelik Zenica	Zenica
Feniks	Banja Luka
Jedinstvo Tuzla	Tuzla
Kozara	Gradiška
Lavovi Brčko	Brčko
Leotar Trebinje	Trebinje
Mladi Krajišnik	Banja Luka
Orlovi	Banja Luka
Play Off Sarajevo	Sarajevo
RMU Banovići	Banovići
Zrinjski 2010 Mostar	Mostar

== Champions ==
- Official list confirmed by FIBA for all Bosnia and Herzegovina

Season	Winner	Runner-up
1992–93	Not held	
1993–94	Jedinstvo Tuzla	.
1994–95	Cenex Sarajevo	.
1995–96	Jedinstvo Tuzla	.
1996–97	Jedinstvo Tuzla	.
1997–98	SAB Željezničar	.
1998–99	Željezničar New Time	Sirela mljekara
1999–00	Port Mladi Krajišnik	.
2000–01	Port Mladi Krajišnik	.
2001–02	Željezničar Sarajevo	.
2002–03	Željezničar Sarajevo	Troglav Livno
2003–04	Željezničar CO	.
2004–05	Željezničar CO	.
2005–06	Željezničar Sarajevo	Jedinstvo Tuzla
2006–07	Željezničar Sarajevo	Mladi Krajišnik
2007–08	Željezničar Sarajevo	Mladi Krajišnik
2008–09	Željezničar Sarajevo	Mladi Krajišnik
2009–10	Željezničar Sarajevo	Čelik Zenica
2010–11	Željezničar Sarajevo	Čelik Zenica
2011–12	Čelik Zenica	Mladi Krajišnik
2012–13	Mladi Krajišnik	Jedinstvo Tuzla
2013–14	Čelik Zenica	Play Off Sarajevo
2014–15	Čelik Zenica	Play Off Sarajevo
2015–16	Play Off Sarajevo	RMU Banovići
2016–17	Play Off Sarajevo	Čelik Zenica
2017–18	RMU Banovići	Play Off Sarajevo
2018–19	RMU Banovići	Orlovi
2019–20	Interrupted due to the COVID-19 pandemic in Bosnia and Herzegovina	
2019–20	RMU Banovići	Orlovi
2020–21	Orlovi	Feniks Pale
2021–22	Play Off Sarajevo	Orlovi

=== Champions of regional leagues ===
- Official list confirmed by FIBA for national regional leagues before 2002

==== League of KSBiH ====
Season	Winner	Runner-up
1992–93	Not held	
1993–94	Jedinstvo Tuzla	.
1994–95	Cenex Sarajevo	.
1995–96	Jedinstvo Tuzla	.
1996–97	Jedinstvo Tuzla	.
1997–98	SAB Željezničar	.
1998–99	Željezničar New Time	.
1999–00	Željezničar Sarajevo	.
2000–01	Željezničar Sarajevo	.
2001–02	Željezničar Sarajevo	.

==== League of Republika Srpska ====
Season	Winner	Runner-up
1992–93	Not held	
1993–94	Not held	
1994–95	Not held	
1995–96	Not held	
1996–97	Not held	
1997–98	Not held	
1998–99	Not held	
1999–00	Port Mladi Krajišnik	.
2000–01	Port Mladi Krajišnik	.
2001–02	Bijeljina	.

==== League of Herzeg-Bosnia ====
Season	Winner	Runner-up
1992–93	Not held	
1993–94	Not held	
1994–95	Not held	
1995–96	Not held	
1996–97	.	.
1997–98	.	.
1998–99	.	.
1999–00	Livno	.
2000–01	Županjac Tomislavgrad	.
2001–02	Županjac Tomislavgrad	.

== List of champions ==
- Including titles in SFR Yugoslavia and Bosnia and Herzegovina

Team	Winners	Runners-up	Years Won	Years Runner-up
Željezničar Sarajevo	14	–	1971, 1995, 1998, 1999, 2002, 2003, 2004, 2005, 2006, 2007, 2008, 2009, 2010, 2011	–
Jedinstvo Tuzla	6	2	1987, 1988, 1990, 1994, 1996, 1997	2006, 2013
Mladi Krajišnik	3	4	2000, 2001, 2013	2007, 2008, 2009, 2012
Čelik Zenica	3	3	2012, 2014, 2015	2010, 2011, 2017
Play Off Sarajevo	3	3	2016, 2017, 2022	2014, 2015, 2018
RMU Banovići	3	1	2018, 2019, 2020	2016
Orlovi	1	2	2021	2019, 2022
Livno	–	2	–	1999, 2003
Feniks Pale	–	1	–	2021
