= ŽKK Željezničar Sarajevo =

- Leagues: Bosnian League
- Founded: 1921
- Arena: Dvorana Mirza Delibašić (capacity: 6.500)
- Location: Sarajevo, Bosnia and Herzegovina
- Team colors: Blue and White
- President: (Bosnia and Herzegovina) Marin Ivanišević
- Head coach: (Bosnia and Herzegovina) Edina Ljubunčić
- Championships: 14 Bosnian League; 9 Bosnian Cup; 1 Adriatic League

Ženski košarkaški klub Željezničar Sarajevo (English: Women's Basketball Club Željezničar Sarajevo) is a Bosnian women's basketball team from Sarajevo, Bosnia and Herzegovina.

== History ==
In 1982. ŽKK Željezničar competed in the second division of Yugoslavia, with great success and without losing a match. the team was led by coach Miodrag Vesković, won first place and the club returned to the First division. With a very small selection of players in the 1983–84 season, the team was elected to the first division. The following season 1984–85, the team was joined by a pair of showgirls including the Vesna Bajkuša (showgirl youth branches ŽKK Željezničar), and achieved fourth place and thus won the right to contest the Cup Liliana Ronchetti. With inexperienced and very young players in the first round of the Montmontaža from Zagreb. The following season, the team again won the fourth place in the championship of Yugoslavia and then left the Cup Liliana Ronchetti, beating the representatives of Greece and Italy, but losing to representatives of Czechoslovakia, the team from the Slavia Prague sports club.The best results in post-war history were achieved by coach Elmedin Omanić, who won the Bosnia and Herzegovina Championship five times, the cup of Bosnia and Herzegovina five times, as well as the Trocal Waba League and placed in the round of 16 of the Ronchetti cup

== Honours ==
=== Domestic ===
National Championships – 14

- Yugoslav League:
  - Winners (1) : 1971
- Bosnian League:
  - Winners (13) : 1995, 1998, 1999, 2002, 2003, 2004, 2005, 2006, 2007, 2008, 2009, 2010, 2011

National Cups – 7

- Yugoslav Cup:
  - Runners-up (2) : 1973, 1992
- Bosnian Cup:
  - Winners (7) : 1998, 1999, 2003, 2004, 2005, 2006, 2007

=== International ===
International titles – 1

- Adriatic League Women:
  - Winners (1) : 2003

== Notable former players ==
- Tima Džebo
- Vesna Bajkuša
- Olga Đoković

== Notable former coaches ==
- Miodrag Vesković
- Elmedin Omanić
- Vesna Bajkuša
