= Dragoslava Žakula =

Bosnian-Serbian basketball player

Personal information
- Born: 20 August 1973 (age 53) Slavonski Brod, SR Croatia, SFR Yugoslavia
- Listed height: 1.75 m (5 ft 9 in)

Career information
- Playing career: 1997–2013
- Position: Point guard

Career history
- 1997–1998: Hemofarm
- 1998–1999: Kovin
- 1999–2000: MiZo Pecsi VSK
- 2000–2001: Razovojna Banka
- 2001–2003: Bne Yehuda Ziontronics
- 2007–2008: Lotos Gdynia
- 2008–2009: Mladi Krajišnik
- 2009–2010: AEL Limassol
- 2010–2013: Mladi Krajišnik

Dragoslava Mikeš (née Žakula; Serbian Cyrillic: Драгослава Микеш, née Жакула; born 20 August 1973) is a former Bosnian-Serbian basketball player.
