= ŽKK Mladi Krajišnik =

Bosnian basketball club

- Nickname: Malene (Little ones)
- Leagues: Bosnian League
- Founded: 1963
- Arena: Sport hall Obilićevo (capacity: 800)
- Location: Banja Luka, Bosnia and Herzegovina
- Team colors: Black and red
- President: Brane Čovičković
- Head coach: Milan Šobot

Ženski košarkaški klub Mladi Krajišnik (transl. Women's Basketball Club Young Krajišnik; Serbian: Женски кошаркашки клуб Млади Крајишник) is a women's professional basketball club based in Banja Luka, Bosnia and Herzegovina. The club is founded in 1963. Home matches are played at the Obilićevo Sports Hall, which has a capacity of 800 spectators. It is considered the most successful women's basketball club in the Republic of Srpska, and currently competes in the Women's Bosnian League. The club's nickname is Malene, and its current sponsor is Meridianbet.

The club's honours include four national championship titles, four Bosnia and Herzegovina Cup victories, as well as nine Republika Srpska championships and 19 Republika Srpska Cups. In 1996 and 1997, it was declared the best sports team of Republika Srpska and was voted the best team in Banja Luka six times. On the international stage, the club has participated in the Ronchetti Cup, the EuroCup, and the regional Women's Adriatic League (WABA).

== History ==
ŽKK Mladi Krajišnik was founded in the 25 May 1963. After just a year of operation in 1964, "Mladi Krajisnik" Banja Luka qualified for the First Federal League at the qualifying tournament in Banja Luka, which was attended by Rudar Trbovlje, Skopje Skopje, Voždovac Belgrade, Mladi Krajišnik Banja Luka, such as Little ones (as it was then popularly called) made his big wish and dream.

From 1964 to 1972 the Little ones are three times fell out and entered the First Federal League, in 1972 the qualifier Little ones they won Partizan Belgrade and the third time become members of the First Federal League. From 1972 until 1995, Little ones are continuously for 23 years a member of the First Federal League and the Red Star Belgrade has the longest continuity of membership in the First Federal League.

War of 1995 Little ones after 23 years of playing got out of the First Federal League to First female B league Yugoslavia where playing for 2 years. 1997 Little ones are after 2 years again placed First Women's Basketball league of Yugoslavia at the qualifying tournament in Ruma were: Trudbenik Beograd, Čelarevo, Budućnost Podgorica and Mladi Krajišnik. In the same season, the club finished as runners-up in the Championship of FR Yugoslavia, a competition in which it participated until 1999.

Since 1993, the club has competed in the Republika Srpska Championship, where it dominated by winning nine consecutive titles. Beginning with the 1999–2000 season, it joined the Joint Championship of Bosnia and Herzegovina and won the national title in its debut season. Over the following decades, the club established itself as one of the most successful women's basketball institutions in the country, accumulating a total of 35 trophies over a span of 25 years.

== Former names ==
- 1964–1985 Mladi krajišnik
- 1985–1988 Krajina Auto Mladi Krajišnik
- 1988–1992 Krajina Auto
- 1997–1998 Port Mladi Krajišnik

== Honours ==
Championship of Federal Republic of Yugoslavia

- runner up (1): 1997–1998

Championship of Bosnia and Herzegovina

- winner (4): 1999–2000, 2000–2001, 2010–2011, 2012–2013

Cup of Bosnia and Herzegovina

- winner (4): 2000, 2007, 2008, 2012

Championship if Republika Srpska

- winner (9): 1992–1993, 1993–1994, 1994–1995, 1995–1996, 1996–1997, 1997–1998, 1998–1999, 1999–2000, 2000–2001

Cup of Republika Srpska

- winner (19): 1993, 1994, 1995, 1996, 1997, 1998, 1999, 2000, 2003, 2005, 2006, 2007, 2008, 2009, 2010, 2011, 2012, 2013, 2014

WABA

- Participant of final four (1): 2009–10

== Notable former players ==
- (Bosnia and Herzegovina) Mersada Bećirspahić
- (Bosnia and Herzegovina) Velinka Bošnjak
- (Bosnia and Herzegovina) Milica Deura
- (Bosnia and Herzegovina) Irena Vrančić
- (Croatia) Ivona Bogoje
- (Croatia) Marijana Bušljeta
- (Croatia) Mirjana Kovčo
- (Montenegro) Biljana Pavićević
- (Serbia) Anđelija Arbutina – Šarenac
- (Serbia) Jadranka Ćosić – Trkulja
- (Serbia) Saša Čađo
- (Serbia) Slađana Golić
- (Serbia) Gordana Janjić
- (Serbia) Ivona Jerković
- (Serbia) Ana Joković
- (Serbia) Lara Mandić
- (Serbia) Marina Marković
- (Serbia) Smilja Rađenović
- (Serbia) Snežana Šipka
- (Serbia) Lena Trajkovski
- (Serbia) Daliborka Vilipić
- (Serbia) Sanda Vuković
- (Serbia) Dragoslava Žakula
