= ŽKK Zrinjski Mostar =

HŽKK Zrinjski 2010 Mostar
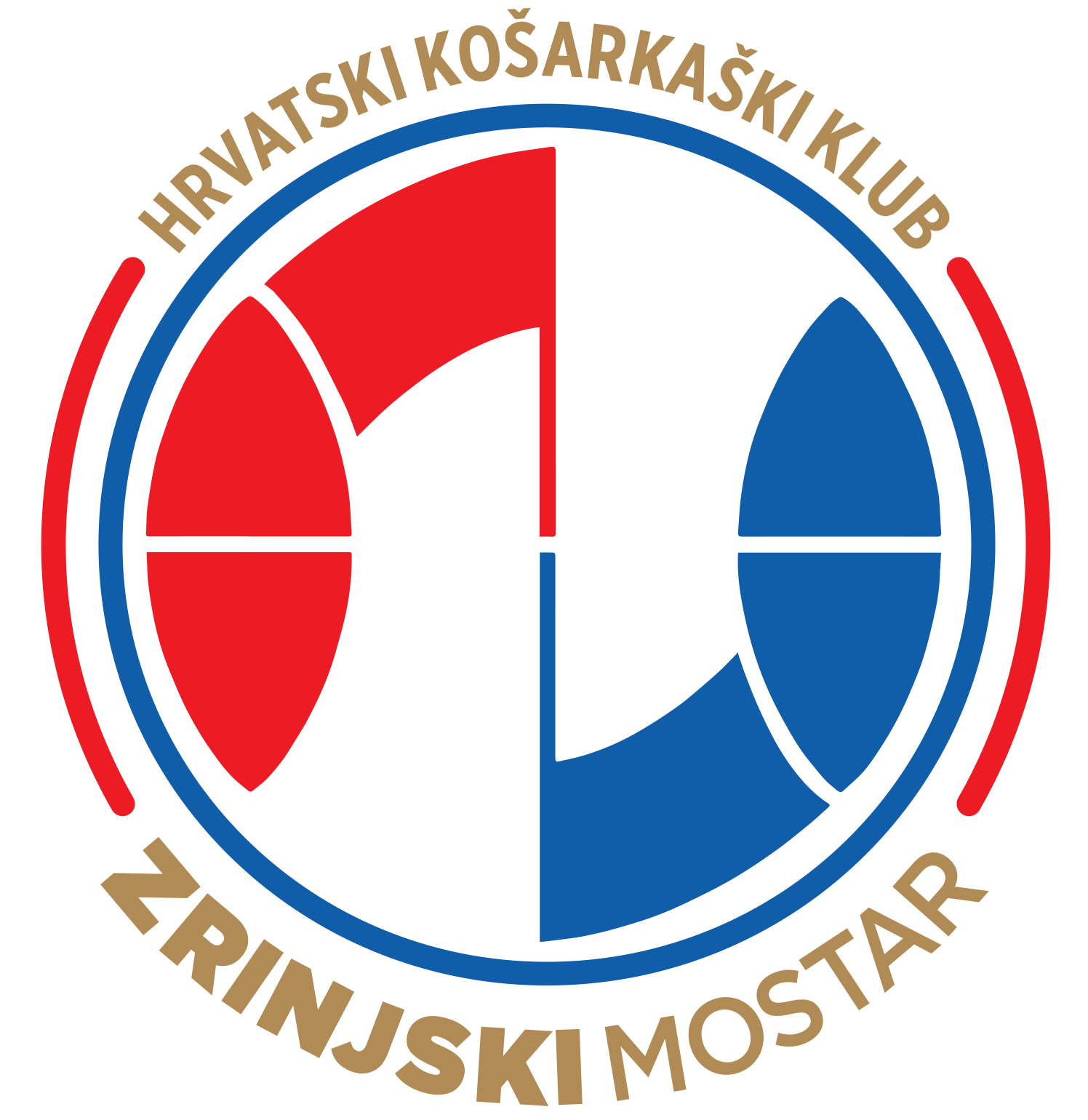
- Nickname: Plemkinje (The Noblewomen)
- Leagues: Division 2
- Founded: 1995; 30 years ago
- Arena: Bijeli Brijeg Hall
- Capacity: 1,000
- Location: Mostar, Bosnia and Herzegovina
- Team colors: White and Red
- President: Nikolina Pandža
- Head coach: Amir Behram
- Website: zkk.zrinjski.net
Home	Away

HŽKK Zrinjski 2010 Mostar (Croatian: Hrvatski ženski košarkaški klub Zrinjski 2010 Mostar, English: Croatian Women's Basketball Club Zrinjski 2010 Mostar) is a Croat-founded basketball team from the city of Mostar, Bosnia and Herzegovina.

The club plays in the Basketball Championship of Bosnia and Herzegovina. It is part of the Zrinjski Mostar sport society. It was formed in 1995.

== Names in history ==
- 1995–2010 - Zrinjski Mostar
- 2010–present - Zrinjski 2010 Mostar
