= 2022–23 WABA League Final Four =

Final Four was held on 25–26 March 2023 in Podgorica, Montenegro.

== Semifinals ==
25 March 2023
16:00

Report

Budućnost Bemax	73–57	Montana 2003
Scoring by quarter: 18:10, 25:20, 13:16, 17:11
Pts: Leković 17; Rebs: Stefanović 9 Asts: Živković 6		Pts: Mitrašinović 16; Rebs: Sutherland 9 Asts: Mitrašinović 5

Bemax Arena, Podgorica
Attendance: 2000
Referees: Marić, Pelja, Hasić

25 March 2023
19:00

Report

Cinkarna Celje	86–57	Vojvodina 021
Scoring by quarter: 23:19, 19:12, 23:9, 21:17
Pts: Jelenc 14; Rebs: Seničar, Debeljak 5 Asts: Bartelme 5		Pts: McNeill 22; Rebs: Janković, Thompson 5 Asts: Stojić 4

Bemax Arena, Podgorica
Attendance: 100
Referees: Terlević, Stanković, Muhvić

== Third place ==
26 March 2023
16:00

Report

Montana 2003	56–64	Vojvodina 021
Scoring by quarter: 16:19, 16:19, 9:11, 15:15
Pts: Mitrašinović 28; Rebs: Sutherland 11; Asts: Mitrašinović 3		Pts: McNeill 22; Rebs: Janković 18; Asts: Stojić 8

Bemax Arena, Podgorica
Attendance: 50
Referees: Marić, Pelja, Hasić

== Final ==
26 March 2023
19:00

Report

Budućnost Bemax	64–66	Cinkarna Celje
Scoring by quarter: 17:16, 15:21, 16:6, 16:23
Pts: Leković 17; Rebs: Živković, Leković 6 Asts: Živković 3		Pts: Čeh 19; Rebs: Seničar, Jelenc 6 Asts: Čeh 3

Bemax Arena, Podgorica
Attendance: 2500
Referees: Terlević, Stanković, Muhvić

== Bracket ==
Semifinals
25 March 2023
1 (Montenegro) Budućnost Bemax	73
4 (Bulgaria) Montana 2003	57
25 March 2023
2 (Slovenia) Cinkarna Celje	86
3 (Serbia) Vojvodina 021	57

Final
26 March 2023
1 (Montenegro) Budućnost Bemax	64
2 (Slovenia) Cinkarna Celje	66
Third place
26 March 2023
4 (Bulgaria) Montana 2003	56
3 (Serbia) Vojvodina 021	64

2022–23 Adriatic League champion

Cinkarna Celje
4th title
