= 2022–23 WABA League SuperLeague =

SuperLeague of the WABA League took place between 11 January 2023 and it will end on 21 March 2023. The four best ranked teams advanced to the Final Four. The points against teams from the same preliminary round were taken over.

== Standings ==
Pos	Team	Pld	W	L	PF	PA	PD	Pts	Qualification or relegation
1	(Montenegro) Budućnost Bemax	14	13	1	1123	760	+363	27	Advance to the Final Four
2	(Slovenia) Cinkarna Celje	14	12	2	1227	782	+445	26	Advance to the Final Four
3	(Serbia) Vojvodina 021	14	10	4	904	754	+150	24	Advance to the Final Four
4	(Bulgaria) Montana 2003	14	7	7	942	948	−6	21	Advance to the Final Four
5	(Bosnia and Herzegovina) Orlovi	14	5	9	865	1151	−286	19	
6	(Serbia) Duga Šabac	14	4	10	910	1040	−130	18	
7	(Croatia) Zagreb	14	4	10	850	996	−146	18	
8	(Bosnia and Herzegovina) Lavovi Brčko	14	1	13	702	1092	−390	15	

Updated to match(es) played on March 21, 2023. Source: WABA League

== Fixtures and results ==
All times given below are in Central European Time (for the match played in Bulgaria is time expressed in Eastern European Time).

=== Game 1 ===
11 January 2023
18:00

Report

Budućnost Bemax	107–46	Lavovi Brčko
Scoring by quarter: 33:11, 19:11, 34:11, 21:13
Pts: Živković 24; Rebs: Bigović, Šćepanović 8 Asts: Leković 6		Pts: Đokić 14; Rebs: Lazarević 7 Asts: Savić 6

Bemax Arena, Podgorica
Attendance: 200
Referees: Dimovski, Jolović, Ilić

11 January 2023
18:00

Report

Montana 2003	93–61	Orlovi
Scoring by quarter: 23:21, 23:25, 25:4, 22:11
Pts: Mitrašinović 26; Rebs: Sutherland 19; Asts: Mitrašinović 10		Pts: Tadić 16; Rebs: Šipka 5 Asts: Radulović 4

Mladost Hall, Montana
Attendance: 100
Referees: Petković, Kovačević, Marčetić

11 January 2023
19:15

Report

Duga Šabac	47–73	Vojvodina 021
Scoring by quarter: 20:12, 9:20, 9:26, 9:15
Pts: Stepanović 16; Rebs: Jelić 7 Asts: Škundrić 5		Pts: McNeill 29; Rebs: Janković 10; Asts: Radulović 6

Šabac Gymnasium Hall, Šabac
Attendance: 100
Referees: Miloradović, Bogojević, Kral

11 January 2023
17:30

Report

Zagreb	48–95	Cinkarna Celje
Scoring by quarter: 13:21, 14:23, 9:26, 12:25
Pts: Budimir 11; Rebs: Budimir 5 Asts: Jakšić 5		Pts: Debeljak 19; Rebs: Loomis 8 Asts: Čeh 4

Boško Božić Pepsi, Zagreb
Attendance: 50
Referees: Adamović, Dojčinović, Srdić

=== Game 2 ===
18 January 2023
16:30

Report

Vojvodina 021	65–42	Zagreb
Scoring by quarter: 14:11, 14:16, 16:11, 21:4
Pts: McNeill 17; Rebs: Marić 8 Asts: Radulović 7		Pts: Ćurić 12; Rebs: Ostojić 8 Asts: Jakšić 4

Petrovaradin Hall, Novi Sad
Attendance: 50
Referees: Pelja, Bajgorić, Hasić

18 January 2023
18:00

Report

Orlovi	75–64	Duga Šabac
Scoring by quarter: 27:18, 16:19, 13:17, 19:10
Pts: Kondić 24; Rebs: Šipka, Krakić 7 Asts: Ristić 7		Pts: Stepanović 23; Rebs: Stepanović 13; Asts: three players 2

Obilićevo Hall, Banja Luka
Attendance: 100
Referees: Kruljac, Muhvić, Ćopić

18 January 2023
19:00

Report

Lavovi Brčko	46–62	Montana 2003
Scoring by quarter: 11:24, 17:12, 12:12, 6:14
Pts: Savić 14; Rebs: Lazarević 9 Asts: Halilović 3		Pts: Mitrašinović 27; Rebs: Sutherland 20; Asts: Mitrašinović 11

Brčko Technical School, Brčko
Attendance: 100
Referees: Holjevac, Grubišić, Lipovac

18 January 2023
19:00

Report

Cinkarna Celje	61–59	Budućnost Bemax
Scoring by quarter: 18:17, 16:15, 12:16, 15:11
Pts: Loomis 20; Rebs: Simmons 9 Asts: Loomis 4		Pts: Leković 17; Rebs: Marković 8 Asts: Marković 3

Hall Gimnazija Center Celje, Celje
Attendance: 500
Referees: Terlević, Žagar, Koraca

=== Game 3 ===
25 January 2023
20:30

Report

Duga Šabac	85–73	Lavovi Brčko
Scoring by quarter: 21:21, 23:22, 29:11, 12:19
Pts: Gluvić 19; Rebs: Jelić 7 Asts: Cleveland, Škundrić 4		Pts: Halilović 18; Rebs: Lazarević 5 Asts: Đokić, Savić 3

Šabac Gymnasium Hall, Šabac
Attendance: 100
Referees: Hartman, Andrić, Šola

25 January 2023
18:00

Report

Budućnost Bemax	52–46	Vojvodina 021
Scoring by quarter: 14:12, 14:11, 12:15, 12:8
Pts: Živković 15; Rebs: Radonjić, Marković 8 Asts: Živković 5		Pts: Janković 11; Rebs: Thompson 9 Asts: Jakovljević 4

Bemax Arena, Podgorica
Attendance: 300
Referees: Kajan, Šutalo, Jurković

25 January 2023
18:00

Report

Montana 2003	50–95	Cinkarna Celje
Scoring by quarter: 9:23, 12:20, 16:24, 13:28
Pts: Dencheva 10; Rebs: Mitrašinović 7 Asts: Mitrašinović 7		Pts: Loomis 18; Rebs: Seničar, Simmons 11; Asts: Čeh 6

Mladost Hall, Montana
Attendance: 200
Referees: Bogojević, Dimovski, Kovačević

25 January 2023
17:30

Report

Zagreb	73–47	Orlovi
Scoring by quarter: 16:22, 20:11, 18:4, 19:10
Pts: Čurić, Ostojić 13; Rebs: Ostojić 11; Asts: three players 5		Pts: Krakić 11; Rebs: Tadić 9 Asts: Krakić 4

Boško Božić Pepsi, Zagreb
Attendance: 40
Referees: Gajšek, Rebeušek, Smolej

=== Game 4 ===
30 January 2023
18:00

Report

Lavovi Brčko	64–63	Zagreb
Scoring by quarter: 25:22, 21:11, 7:11, 11:19
Pts: Karišik 16; Rebs: Lazarević 11; Asts: Đokić 6		Pts: Miletić 25; Rebs: Pavić 12; Asts: Pavić 6

Brčko Technical School, Brčko
Attendance: 100
Referees: Petković, Kovačević, Marčetić

4 February 2023
17:00

Report

Cinkarna Celje	99–64	Duga Šabac
Scoring by quarter: 25:13, 24:15, 26:14, 24:22
Pts: Bartelme 15; Rebs: Gbemuotor 10; Asts: Seničar 6		Pts: Stepanović 22; Rebs: Cleveland 8 Asts: five players 3

Hall Gimnazija Center Celje, Celje
Attendance: 200
Referees: Muhvić, Copić, Basić

2 February 2023
21:00

Report

Vojvodina 021	50–46	Montana 2003
Scoring by quarter: 15:13, 12:15, 12:13, 11:5
Pts: Janković, Selaković 12; Rebs: Thompson 15; Asts: Radulović 8		Pts: Mitrašinović 17; Rebs: Sutherland 9 Asts: three players 2

Petrovaradin Hall, Novi Sad
Attendance: 30
Referees: Nikšić, Kadrić, Fočo

8 March 2023
18:00

Report

Orlovi	53–116	Budućnost Bemax
Scoring by quarter: 17:38, 17:28, 9:27, 10:23
Pts: Šipka 14; Rebs: Šipka 8 Asts: Mitrović 4		Pts: Radonjić 20; Rebs: Šćepanović 8 Asts: Živković 7

Bemax Arena, Podgorica
Attendance: 200
Referees: Dimovski, Jolović, Ilić

=== Game 5 ===
18 February 2023
18:00

Report

Lavovi Brčko	46–73	Budućnost Bemax
Scoring by quarter: 14:20, 11:15, 12:20, 9:18
Pts: Đokić, Halilović 15; Rebs: Lazarević 10; Asts: Đokić 4		Pts: Živković 27; Rebs: Živković 13; Asts: Živković 10

Brčko Technical School, Brčko
Attendance: 70
Referees: Hartman, Holjevac, Andrić

15 February 2023
18:00

Report

Orlovi	65–81	Montana 2003
Scoring by quarter: 18:18, 15:15, 17:25, 15:23
Pts: Ristić 14; Rebs: Tadić 6 Asts: Mitrović 5		Pts: Sutherland 20; Rebs: Sutherland 17; Asts: Mitrašinović, Aleksieva 5

Obilićevo Hall, Banja Luka
Attendance: 100
Referees: Kruljac, Pavičić, Ružić

11 February 2023
17:30

Report

Vojvodina 021	84–61	Duga Šabac
Scoring by quarter: 20:15, 17:22, 24:17, 23:7
Pts: Radulović 18; Rebs: Janković, Thompson 8 Asts: Radulović, Stojić 5		Pts: Stepanović 16; Rebs: Jelić 9 Asts: Stepanović, Škundrić 3

Petrovaradin Hall, Novi Sad
Attendance: 100
Referees: Miloradović, Kovačević, Marčetić

16 February 2023
18:00

Report

Cinkarna Celje	75–64	Zagreb
Scoring by quarter: 14:17, 24:15, 13:17, 24:15
Pts: Jelenc 15; Rebs: Seničar 7 Asts: Bartelme 6		Pts: Ostojić 26; Rebs: Pavić 9 Asts: Miletić 6

Hall Gimnazija Center Celje, Celje
Attendance: 100
Referees: Adamović, Dojčinović, Simić

=== Game 6 ===
23 February 2023
19:15

Report

Zagreb	62–50	Vojvodina 021
Scoring by quarter: 20:9, 23:11, 9:16, 10:14
Pts: Ostojić 19; Rebs: Terze 8 Asts: Terze 4		Pts: Radulović 12; Rebs: Đukić 6 Asts: Radulović 5

Boško Božić Pepsi, Zagreb
Attendance: 100
Referees: Pipan, Gajšek, Selimović

21 March 2023
19:00

Report

Duga Šabac	67–70	Orlovi
Scoring by quarter: 25:18, 14:12, 10:19, 18:21
Pts: Cleveland 28; Rebs: Stepanović, Stanković 10; Asts: Cleveland 3		Pts: Predojević 18; Rebs: Tadić 6 Asts: Ristić 8

Šabac Gymnasium Hall, Šabac
Attendance: 100
Referees: Katić, Hartman, Holjevac

4 March 2023
17:00

Report

Montana 2003	85–62	Lavovi Brčko
Scoring by quarter: 29:20, 18:15, 16:14, 22:13
Pts: Nikolova 21; Rebs: Sutherland 14; Asts: Nikolova 6		Pts: Halilović 17; Rebs: Đokić 9 Asts: Halilović 4

Mladost Hall, Montana
Attendance: 100
Referees: Petković, Kovačević, Marčetić

25 February 2023
18:00

Report

Budućnost Bemax	72–60	Cinkarna Celje
Scoring by quarter: 20:13, 12:18, 19:15, 21:14
Pts: Leković 21; Rebs: Stefanović 8 Asts: Leković 8		Pts: Loomis 13; Rebs: Jelenc 10; Asts: Čeh 5

Bemax Arena, Podgorica
Attendance: 1000
Referees: Radanović, Komar, Kovačević

=== Game 7 ===
15 March 2023
20:30

Report

Lavovi Brčko	50–63	Duga Šabac
Scoring by quarter: 16:14, 7:19, 18:21, 9:9
Pts: Halilović 21; Rebs: Đokić, Halilović 6 Asts: Halilović 4		Pts: Gluvić 26; Rebs: Stepanović 8 Asts: Škundrić 6

Brčko Technical School, Brčko
Attendance: 50
Referees: Katić, Hartman, Barišić

2 March 2023
16:30

Report

Vojvodina 021	43–67	Budućnost Bemax
Scoring by quarter: 9:21, 11:14, 9:12, 14:20
Pts: Thompson 12; Rebs: Marić 9 Asts: Jakovljević 4		Pts: Stefanović 17; Rebs: Stefanović 10; Asts: Leković 5

Petrovaradin Hall, Novi Sad
Attendance: 10
Referees: Pelja, Hasić, Ćorović

1 March 2023
18:00

Report

Cinkarna Celje	99–59	Montana 2003
Scoring by quarter: 24:13, 23:15, 24:19, 28:12
Pts: Loomis 22; Rebs: Simmons 7 Asts: Čeh 10		Pts: Sutherland 13; Rebs: Sutherland 11; Asts: Nikolova 4

Hall Gimnazija Center Celje, Celje
Attendance: 100
Referees: Terlević, Žagar, Koraca

15 March 2023
18:00

Report

Orlovi	85–75	Zagreb
Scoring by quarter: 22:24, 20:28, 14:8, 26:15
Pts: Ristić 23; Rebs: Predojević 12; Asts: Kondić 10		Pts: Miletić 23; Rebs: Miletić 10; Asts: Ostojić 5

Obilićevo Hall, Banja Luka
Attendance: 100
Referees: Gašek, Oprckal, Rebeušek

=== Game 8 ===
8 March 2023
17:30

Report

Zagreb	68–45	Lavovi Brčko
Scoring by quarter: 14:7, 22:9, 17:14, 15:15
Pts: Miletić 18; Rebs: Maršić 9 Asts: Ostojić 7		Pts: Halilović 16; Rebs: Lazarević 7 Asts: Đokić 4

Boško Božić Pepsi, Zagreb
Attendance: 60
Referees: Pipan, Gajšek, Selimović

8 March 2023
19:00

Report

Duga Šabac	53–89	Cinkarna Celje
Scoring by quarter: 6:28, 9:24, 26:18, 12:19
Pts: Stepanović 15; Rebs: four players 6 Asts: three players 2		Pts: Loomis 16; Rebs: Seničar 7 Asts: Bartelme 7

Hall Park, Stara Pazova
Attendance: 30
Referees: Holjevac, Barišić, Andrić

8 March 2023
18:00

Report

Montana 2003	49–54	Vojvodina 021
Scoring by quarter: 15:13, 11:13, 15:15, 8:13
Pts: Sutherland 13; Rebs: Sutherland 18; Asts: three players 3		Pts: Radulović 15; Rebs: McNeill, Janković 9 Asts: Radulović, Janković 3

Mladost Hall, Montana
Attendance: 200
Referees: Nikšić, Kadrić, Fočo

9 March 2023
17:00

Report

Budućnost Bemax	97–63	Orlovi
Scoring by quarter: 24:10, 28:10, 27:24, 18:19
Pts: Marković 14; Rebs: Stefanović 8 Asts: Živković 5		Pts: Predojević 17; Rebs: Predojević 10; Asts: Ristić, Mitrović 4

Bemax Arena, Podgorica
Attendance: 150
Referees: Dimovski, Jolović, Ilić
