= ŽKK Čelik Zenica =

KŽK Čelik Zenica
- Leagues: Bosnian First League; Adriatic League
- Founded: 1998
- Arena: Arena Zenica (capacity: 6.200)
- Location: Zenica, Bosnia and Herzegovina
- Team colors: Red and White
- Head coach: Aida Kalušić
- Championships: 3 National League; 5 National Cup

KŽK Čelik Zenica is a women's basketball club from Zenica, Bosnia and Herzegovina. Ženski košarkaški klub Čelik Zenica osnovan je 1998. godine i danas je najtrofejniji ženski košarkaški klub u Bosni i Hercegovini. Naše seniorke i mlađe selekcije treniraju i nastupaju u Gradskoj areni „Husejin Smajlović“, pod crveno-bijelim bojama koje simbolizuju energiju, zajedništvo i tradiciju Zenice.

Kroz više od dvije decenije postojanja, klub je postao sinonim za uspjeh, ali i za sistematski rad s mladim generacijama koje čine temelj budućnosti košarke u Zenici i šire.

== Trofeji i dostignuća ==
- Prvakinje BiH: 2012, 2014, 2015
- Kup BiH: 2011, 2012, 2014, 2015, 2016
- Viceprvakinje MŽRKL/WABA: 2012 (Final-Four u Zenici)

== Naša uloga u zajednici ==
KŽK Čelik Zenica nije samo sportski kolektiv - mi smo i dio društvene zajednice.

Kroz Školu košarke i Akademiju KŽK Čelik omogućavamo djevojčicama da naprave prve korake pod obručima, učimo ih vrijednostima sporta i timskog duha, te promovišemo zdrav način života. Naše igračice su ambasadori Zenice i Bosne i Hercegovine na domaćim i međunarodnim terenima.

== Honours ==
=== Domestic ===
National Championships – 3

- Bosnian League:
  - Winner (3) : 2012, 2014, 2015
  - Runners-up (3) : 2010, 2011, 2017
  - 3rd place (1) : 2020

National Cups – 5

- Bosnian Cup
  - Winner (5) : 2011, 2012, 2014, 2015, 2016
  - Runners-up (2) : 2006, 2017, 2020
