= ŽKK RMU Banovići =

- Leagues: Bosnian First League; WABA 2 League
- Founded: 1974; 52 years ago
- Arena: SKC Banovići
- Location: Banovići, Bosnia and Herzegovina
- Team colors: Black, white, green
- Championships: 3 National Leagues; 3 National Cups

ŽKK RMU Banovići is a women's basketball club based in Banovići, Bosnia and Herzegovina. The club was originally founded in 1974 and was officially re-registered in 1996. The team competes in the Bosnia and Herzegovina Women's Basketball Championship, the country's top-tier league for women's basketball. ŽKK RMU Banovići plays its home games at the Sports and Cultural Center (SKC) Banovići, a local indoor arena that serves as the club's base for both domestic competitions and regional tournaments.

The club has achieved major success during the second part of the 2010s, establishing itself as one of the leading women's basketball teams in the country. Among its most notable accomplishments are three national championship titles and two Bosnia and Herzegovina Cup victories. A historic highlight came in the 2017–18 season, when the team went undefeated throughout the campaign and won both the national league and the national cup—an achievement that earned the club recognition as the 2018 Sports Club of the Year in Bosnia and Herzegovina.

ŽKK RMU Banovići has also participated in the regional WABA League. The club reached the SuperLeague stage of the competition in the 2021–22 season and recently competed in the inaugural WABA 2 League (second division) during the 2024–25 season.

The club receives sponsorship from Meridianbet, which became an official partner of ŽKK RMU Banovići in 2022.

== Honours ==
=== Domestic ===
- Bosnian First League
  - Winners (3): 2017–18, 2018–19, 2019–20
  - Runners-up (2): 2015–16, 2022–23
- Bosnian Cup
  - Winners (3): 2017–18, 2018–19, 2019–20
  - Runners-up (2): 2020–21, 2022–23
