= ŽKK Play Off Sarajevo =

- Leagues: Bosnian First League; Adriatic League
- History: Play Off Ultra (2017-2021)
- Arena: KSC Ilidza (capacity: 2700)
- Location: Sarajevo, Bosnia and Herzegovina
- Team colors: Violet and Yellow
- Head coach: Nedim Đedović
- Championships: 3 National League
- Website: zkkplayoff.com

ŽKK Play Off Sarajevo, currently known as ŽKK Play Off Meridianbet for sponsorship reasons, is a professional women's basketball club based in Sarajevo, Bosnia and Herzegovina. The team competes in the Bosnia and Herzegovina Women's Basketball Championship and plays its home games at the Ilidža Cultural and Sports Center, which has a capacity of 2,700 spectators. Remarkably, within just 15 months of the formation of the women's team, the club won the A1 League (second-tier competition) in the 2012/2013 season, and finished as runners-up in the national championship the following year. Among its most notable achievements are three Bosnia and Herzegovina national championship titles and one Bosnia and Herzegovina Cup victory. ŽKK Play Off has also participated in the Adriatic League, competing against top teams from the region.

== Honours ==
=== Domestic ===
National Championships – 3

- Bosnian First League:
  - Winner (3): 2016, 2017, 2022
  - Runners-up (3): 2014, 2015, 2018
- Bosnian Cup
  - Winner (1): 2017
  - Runners-up (2): 2016, 2018, 2022

== Season standings ==
2013-14: 2nd; 2014-15: 2nd; 2015-16: Winner; 2016-17: Winner	2017-18: 2nd; 2018-19: 4th; 2019-20: 4th; 2020-21: 4th	2021-22: Winner; 2022-23: 4th; 2023-24: 8th; 2024-25: 3rd

== Notable former players ==
List of notable former players:

Note: Flags indicate national team eligibility at FIBA-sanctioned events. Players may hold other non-FIBA nationalities not displayed.

Criteria

To appear in this section a player must have either:

- Set a club record or won an individual award while at the club
- Played at least one official international match for their national team at any time
- Played at least one official NBA match at any time.

(Bosnia and Herzegovina) Neira Alispahić; (Bosnia and Herzegovina) Sandra Azinović; (Bosnia and Herzegovina) Ines Babić; (Bosnia and Herzegovina) Nikolina Babić; (Bosnia and Herzegovina) Amra Begić; (Bosnia and Herzegovina) Dajana Bugarin; (Bosnia and Herzegovina) Almira Ćato; (Bosnia and Herzegovina) Anđela Delić; (Bosnia and Herzegovina) Nikolina Delić	(Bosnia and Herzegovina) Nikolina Džebo; (Bosnia and Herzegovina) Marina Džinić; (Bosnia and Herzegovina) Miljana Džombeta; (Bosnia and Herzegovina) Valentina Galušić; (Bosnia and Herzegovina) Nedžla Kovačević; (Bosnia and Herzegovina) Zdenka Kovačević; (Bosnia and Herzegovina) Jovana Marković; (Bosnia and Herzegovina) Azra Nikšić; (Bosnia and Herzegovina) Lejla Omerbašić	(Bosnia and Herzegovina) Tea Perić; (Bosnia and Herzegovina) Hena Spahić; (Bosnia and Herzegovina) Iris Starčević; (Bosnia and Herzegovina) Vanja Vasilić; (Croatia) Amra Đapo; (Montenegro) Milica Milošev; (Serbia) Ines Ćorda; (Serbia) Nikolina Nikolić; (Serbia) Bojana Vulić	(United Kingdom) Samantha Roscoe; (United States) Cory Tiny Adams; (United States) Deijah Blanks; (United States) Cierra Ceazer; (United States) Andie Easley; (United States) Monet Johnson; (United States) Teisha King; (United States) Rishonda Napier

== Notable former coaches ==
- (Bosnia and Herzegovina) Goran Lojo

Armin Šećerović (2017/18-2021/22) Alem Hasanović (2022/23 - 2023) Nedim Đedović (2023- )
