= 2021–22 WABA League =

WABA League
- Season: 2021–22
- Duration: September 29, 2021 – December 21, 2021 (Regular season); January 5, 2022 – March 15, 2022 (SuperLeague); March 3, 2022 – March 16, 2022 (Classification 9–12); 19–20 March 2022 (Final Four)
- Games played: 98
- Teams: 12

Regular season
- Season MVP: (Democratic Republic of the Congo) La mama Kapinga Maweja

Finals
- Champions: (Slovenia) Cinkarna Celje (3rd title)
- Runners-up: (Montenegro) Budućnost Bemax
- Semifinalists: (Bosnia and Herzegovina) Orlovi (Bulgaria) Montana 2003
- Finals MVP: (Brazil) Isabela Lyra

Records
- Biggest home win: Cinkarna Celje 122–50 RMU Banovići (27 October 2021)
- Biggest away win: RMU Banovići 46–106 Cinkarna Celje (15 December 2021)
- Highest scoring: KAM Basket 99–84 Partizan 1953 (16 March 2022)
- Highest attendance: 2600; Budućnost Bemax 51–58 Cinkarna Celje (20 March 2022)
- Lowest attendance: No data for several matches 10; Vojvodina 021 86–57 KAM Basket (11 November 2021); Orlovi 74–79 Budućnost Bemax (15 December 2021)
- All statistics correct as of July 25, 2022.

The 2021–22 WABA League is the 21st season of the Adriatic League. Competition included twelve teams from seven countries. In this season participating clubs from Serbia, Montenegro, Bosnia and Herzegovina, Bulgaria, Croatia, North Macedonia and Slovenia.

Reigning WABA champion Beroe Stara Zagora (Bulgaria) have withdrawn from the 2021–22 WABA League.

25 September 2021 Feniks Pale (Bosnia and Herzegovina) has withdraws from the 2021–22 WABA League. As per the Official Basketball Rules, all games were awarded to their respective opponents with a score of 20-0. Furthermore, the forfeiting team Feniks will receive 0 classification points in the standings.

== Teams ==
=== Team allocation ===
Regular season
(Bulgaria) Montana 2003	(Bosnia and Herzegovina) RMU Banovići	(Slovenia) Cinkarna Celje	(Serbia) Vojvodina 021	(Croatia) Plamen Požega	(North Macedonia) Badel 1862
(Bosnia and Herzegovina) Feniks Pale	(Bosnia and Herzegovina) Orlovi	(Slovenia) Triglav Kranj	(Serbia) Partizan 1953	(Montenegro) Budućnost Bemax	(North Macedonia) Kam Basket

=== Venues and locations ===
Location of teams in the 2021–22 WABA League
Location of teams in the 2021–22 WABA League

Team	Home city	Arena	Capacity
Badel 1862	Skopje	Nezavisna Makedonija Hall	600
Budućnost Bemax	Podgorica	Bemax Arena	2,500
Cinkarna Celje	Celje	Gimnazija Center Celje Hall	1,500
Feniks Pale	Banja Luka	Obilićevo Hall	600
Kam Basket	Makedonska Kamenica	Kiril i Metodij Hall	
Kam Basket	Skopje	SRC Kale	2,500
Montana 2003	Montana	Mladost Sports Hall	
Orlovi	Banja Luka	Obilićevo Hall	600
Partizan 1953	Beograd	Ranko Žeravica Sports Hall	5,000
Plamen Požega	Požega	Tomislav Pirc	1,200
RMU Banovići	Banovići	SKC Banovići	
Triglav Kranj	Kranj	Športna dvorana Planina	800
Vojvodina 021	Novi Sad	Petrovaradin Hall	900

== Regular season ==
In the Regular season was played with 12 teams divided into 2 groups of 6 teams and play a dual circuit system, each with one game each at home and away. The four best teams in each group at the end of the regular season were placed in the SuperLeague. The regular season began on 29 September 2021 and it will end on 21 December 2021.

=== Group A ===
Pos	Team	Pld	W	L	PF	PA	PD	Pts	Qualification or relegation
1	(Montenegro) Budućnost Bemax	10	10	0	698	435	+263	20	Advance to SuperLeague
2	(Bosnia and Herzegovina) Orlovi	10	7	3	538	511	+27	17	Advance to SuperLeague
3	(Serbia) Vojvodina 021	10	6	4	596	505	+91	16	Advance to SuperLeague
4	(Slovenia) Triglav Kranj	10	5	5	538	549	−11	15	Advance to SuperLeague
5	(North Macedonia) KAM Basket	10	2	8	488	658	−170	12	Advance to Classification 9–12
6	(Bosnia and Herzegovina) Feniks Pale	10	0	10	0	200	−200	10	Advance to Classification 9–12

Updated to match(es) played on December 15, 2021. Source: WABA League

=== Group B ===
Pos	Team	Pld	W	L	PF	PA	PD	Pts	Qualification or relegation
1	(Slovenia) Cinkarna Celje	10	9	1	947	602	+345	19	Advance to SuperLeague
2	(Bulgaria) Montana 2003	10	8	2	813	672	+141	18	Advance to SuperLeague
3	(Croatia) Plamen Požega	10	7	3	843	753	+90	17	Advance to SuperLeague
4	(North Macedonia) Badel 1862	10	4	6	664	754	−90	14	Advance to SuperLeague
5	(Serbia) Partizan 1953	10	2	8	699	758	−59	12	Advance to Classification 9–12
6	(Bosnia and Herzegovina) RMU Banovići	10	0	10	527	954	−427	10	Advance to Classification 9–12

Updated to match(es) played on December 21, 2021. Source: WABA League

== SuperLeague ==
In the SuperLeague was played with 8 teams and play a dual circuit system, each with one game each at home and away. The four best teams in SuperLeague at the end of the last round were placed on the Final Four. The SuperLeague began on 5 January 2022 and it will end on 15 March 2022.

Pos	Team	Pld	W	L	PF	PA	PD	Pts	Qualification or relegation
1	(Montenegro) Budućnost Bemax	14	13	1	1107	832	+275	27	Advance to the Final Four
2	(Slovenia) Cinkarna Celje	14	12	2	1124	883	+241	26	Advance to the Final Four
3	(Bosnia and Herzegovina) Orlovi	14	8	6	944	991	−47	22	Advance to the Final Four
4	(Bulgaria) Montana 2003	14	8	6	1013	1023	−10	22	Advance to the Final Four
5	(Serbia) Vojvodina 021	14	7	7	973	918	+55	21	
6	(Croatia) Plamen Požega	14	4	10	1035	1192	−157	18	
7	(Slovenia) Triglav Kranj	14	3	11	857	991	−134	17	
8	(North Macedonia) Badel 1862	14	1	13	855	1078	−223	15	

Updated to match(es) played on March 15, 2022. Source: WABA League

== Classification 9–12 ==
Classification 9–12 of the WABA League took place between 3 March 2022 and it will end on 16 March 2022.

Feniks Pale has withdrawn from the 2021–22 WABA League. As per the Official Basketball Rules, all games were awarded to their respective opponents with a score of 20-0. Furthermore, the forfeiting team Feniks will receive 0 classification points in the standings.

=== Ninth place game ===
Team #1	Agg.	Team #2	1st leg	2nd leg	Extra time
(Serbia) Partizan 1953	181:184	(North Macedonia) KAM Basket	86:71	84:99	11:14

=== Eleventh place game ===
Team #1	Agg.	Team #2	1st leg	2nd leg
(Bosnia and Herzegovina) Feniks Pale	0:40	(Bosnia and Herzegovina) RMU Banovići	0:20	0:20

== Final Four ==
Final Four was held on 19–20 March 2022 in Podgorica, Montenegro.

Semifinals
1 (Montenegro) Budućnost Bemax	102
4 (Bulgaria) Montana 2003	45
2 (Slovenia) Cinkarna Celje	74
3 (Bosnia and Herzegovina) Orlovi	58

Final
(Montenegro) Budućnost Bemax	51
(Slovenia) Cinkarna Celje	58
Third place
(Bulgaria) Montana 2003	63
(Bosnia and Herzegovina) Orlovi	72

2021–22 WABA League champion

Cinkarna Celje
3rd title

== Awards ==
- Final Four MVP: Isabela Lyra (180-F-1994) of (Slovenia) Cinkarna Celje
- Player of the Year: La mama Kapinga Maweja (194-F/C-1997) of (Croatia) Plamen Požega
- Guard of the Year: Dragana Živković (183-SG-2001) of (Montenegro) Budućnost Bemax
- Forward of Year: Isabela Lyra (180-F-1994) of (Slovenia) Cinkarna Celje
- Center of the Year: La mama Kapinga Maweja (194-F/C-1997) of (Croatia) Plamen Požega
- Newcomer of the Year: Jovana Boričić (179-SF-2003) of (Serbia) Partizan 1953
- Most Improved Player of Year: Maruša Seničar (187-SF-1997) of (Slovenia) Cinkarna Celje
- Defensive Player of Year: Maruša Seničar (187-SF-1997) of (Slovenia) Cinkarna Celje
- Coach of the Year: Damir Grgić of (Slovenia) Cinkarna Celje

1st Team

- Santa Okockyte-Balkojiene (175-G-1992) of (Bulgaria) Montana 2003
- Dragana Živković (183-SG-2001) of (Montenegro) Budućnost Bemax
- Isabela Lyra (180-F-1994) of (Slovenia) Cinkarna Celje
- Mina Đorđević (188-PF-1999) of (Montenegro) Budućnost Bemax
- La mama Kapinga Maweja (194-F/C-1997) of (Croatia) Plamen Požega

2nd Team

- Marija Leković (166-PG-2003) of (Montenegro) Budućnost Bemax
- Tamara Rajić (182-G/F-1993) of (Bosnia and Herzegovina) Orlovi
- Jelena Ivezić (183-F-1984) of (Croatia) Plamen Požega
- Maruša Seničar (187-SF-1997) of (Slovenia) Cinkarna Celje
- Sara Loomis (188-PF-1997) of (Serbia) Vojvodina 021

All-Defensive Team

- Mojca Jelenc (200-C-2003) of (Slovenia) Cinkarna Celje
- Barbara Georgieva (188-C-1998) of (Bulgaria) Montana 2003
- Vladinka Erak (192-C-1984) of (Bulgaria) Orlovi
- Lara Bubnič (190-C-1999) of (Slovenia) Cinkarna Celje
- Ivana Kmetovska (190-C-1995) of (North Macedonia) Badel 1862

All-Newcomers Team

- Marija Leković (166-PG-2003) of (Montenegro) Budućnost Bemax
- Marina Davinić (173-SG-2003) of (Serbia) Partizan 1953
- Manca Vrečer (178-SG-2002) of (Slovenia) Triglav Kranj
- Jovana Boričić (179-SF-2003) of (Serbia) Partizan 1953
- Gala Kramžar (180-PG-1999) (Slovenia) Triglav Kranj

== See also ==
- 2021–22 ABA League First Division
- 2021–22 First Women's Basketball League of Serbia
