= 2021–22 WABA League Group B =

Group B of the WABA League took place between 29 September 2021 and it will end on 21 December 2021.

The four best ranked teams advanced to the SuperLeague.

== Standings ==
Pos	Team	Pld	W	L	PF	PA	PD	Pts	Qualification or relegation
1	(Slovenia) Cinkarna Celje	10	9	1	947	602	+345	19	Advance to SuperLeague
2	(Bulgaria) Montana 2003	10	8	2	813	672	+141	18	Advance to SuperLeague
3	(Croatia) Plamen Požega	10	7	3	843	753	+90	17	Advance to SuperLeague
4	(North Macedonia) Badel 1862	10	4	6	664	754	−90	14	Advance to SuperLeague
5	(Serbia) Partizan 1953	10	2	8	699	758	−59	12	Advance to Classification 9–12
6	(Bosnia and Herzegovina) RMU Banovići	10	0	10	527	954	−427	10	Advance to Classification 9–12

Updated to match(es) played on December 21, 2021. Source: WABA League

== Fixtures and results ==
All times given below are in Central European Time (for the match played in Bulgaria is time expressed in Eastern European Time).

=== Game 1 ===
29 September 2021
19:00

Report

Badel 1862	74–77	Montana 2003
Scoring by quarter: 19:17, 19:18, 10:19, 26:23
Pts: Stojanovska 22; Rebs: Kmetovska 12; Asts: Stojanovska 8		Pts: Nikolova, King 15; Rebs: Georgieva 10; Asts: Ivanova 7

Nezavisna Makedonija, Skopje
Attendance: 30
Referees: Krstić, Zdravković, Ilić

15 November 2021
18:00

Report

RMU Banovići	66–95	Plamen Požega
Scoring by quarter: 20:20, 10:24, 20:25, 16:26
Pts: Dragićević 19; Rebs: Ibrić 6 Asts: Kurtić 4		Pts: Ivezić, Kapinga Maweja 25; Rebs: Ivezić 10; Asts: Kapinga Maweja 11

SKC Banovići, Banovići
Attendance: 100
Referees: Petković, Kovačević, Kral

29 September 2021
18:00

Report

Partizan 1953	65–79	Cinkarna Celje
Scoring by quarter: 19:21, 12:26, 14:13, 20:19
Pts: Olić 20; Rebs: Gligić 7 Asts: Gligić 5		Pts: Padree 24; Rebs: Seničar 12; Asts: Čeh 6

Ranko Žeravica Sports Hall, Belgrade
Attendance: 30
Referees: Holjevac, Grubišić, Lipovac

=== Game 2 ===
6 October 2021
18:00

Report

Badel 1862	59–92	Cinkarna Celje
Scoring by quarter: 14:21, 14:28, 19:22, 12:21
Pts: Trajčevska 19; Rebs: Kmetovska 7 Asts: Trajčevska 5		Pts: Ramona 25; Rebs: Seničar 9 Asts: Čeh 5

Nezavisna Makedonija, Skopje
Attendance: 50
Referees: Petković, Kovačević, Kral

7 October 2021
18:00

Report

Plamen Požega	87–84	Partizan 1953
Scoring by quarter: 24:24, 22:12, 25:17, 16:31
Pts: Ivezić 32; Rebs: Kapinga Maweja 23; Asts: Griffin, Ivezić 6		Pts: Gligić 27; Rebs: Gligić 8 Asts: Davinić 6

Tomislav Pirc, Požega
Attendance: 50
Referees: Adamović, Skenderija, Dojčinović

6 October 2021
18:00

Report

Montana 2003	100–45	RMU Banovići
Scoring by quarter: 31:12, 30:5, 24:13, 15:15
Pts: King 15; Rebs: Natskina 12; Asts: Stoycheva 9		Pts: Ikanović 16; Rebs: Dragićević 9 Asts: Dragićević 2

Mladost Hall, Montana
Attendance: /
Referees: Vlahović, Tomić, Jovičin

=== Game 3 ===
13 October 2021
18:00

Report

RMU Banovići	57–70	Badel 1862
Scoring by quarter: 6:18, 14:20, 16:17, 21:15
Pts: Popović 13; Rebs: Lačić, Popović 8 Asts: Ikanović 3		Pts: Kmetovska 24; Rebs: Dimova 10; Asts: Dimova 3

SKC Banovići, Banovići
Attendance: /
Referees: Vlahović, Miloradović, Marčetić

13 October 2021
18:00

Report

Partizan 1953	66–81	Montana 2003
Scoring by quarter: 14:21, 19:11, 12:22, 21:27
Pts: Olić 27; Rebs: Boričić 10; Asts: Gligić 5		Pts: Georgieva 21; Rebs: King 9 Asts: Okockyte-Balkojiene 15

Ranko Žeravica Sports Hall, Belgrade
Attendance: 40
Referees: Nikšić, Kadrić, Fočo

13 October 2021
18:00

Report

Cinkarna Celje	114–65	Plamen Požega
Scoring by quarter: 34:16, 3315, 23:17, 24:17
Pts: Debeljak, Pardee 24; Rebs: Gbemuotor 10; Asts: Čeh 6		Pts: Kapinga Maweja 18; Rebs: Kapinga Maweja 12; Asts: Kešeljević 5

Hall Gimnazija Center Celje, Celje
Attendance: 100
Referees: Pelja, Bajgorić, Hasić

=== Game 4 ===
21 October 2021
19:00

Report

Badel 1862	60–84	Plamen Požega
Scoring by quarter: 12:24, 14:19, 19:13, 15:28
Pts: Trajčevska 16; Rebs: three players 6 Asts: Kmetovska 5		Pts: Kapinga Maweja 25; Rebs: Kapinga Maweja 15; Asts: Ivezić, Kešeljević 5

Nezavisna Makedonija, Skopje
Attendance: 50
Referees: Krstić, Zdravković, Ljubić

20 October 2021
18:00

Report

Montana 2003	77–74	Cinkarna Celje
Scoring by quarter: 22:18, 16:16, 18:21, 21:19
Pts: King, Georgieva 18; Rebs: King 18; Asts: Stoycheva 6		Pts: Pardee 25; Rebs: Seničar 10; Asts: Čeh 7

Mladost Hall, Montana
Attendance: /
Referees: Miloradović, Kovačević, Kral

21 October 2021
18:00

Report

RMU Banovići	58–96	Partizan 1953
Scoring by quarter: 7:34, 12:18, 17:14, 22:30
Pts: Ikanović 13; Rebs: Ikanović, Ibrić 6 Asts: Ibrić, Kurtić 3		Pts: Boričić 19; Rebs: Radivojac 11; Asts: Radojčin 4

SKC Banovići, Banovići
Attendance: 200
Referees: Grubišić, Lipovac, Holjevac

=== Game 5 ===
27 October 2021
18:00

Report

Partizan 1953	70–73	Badel 1862
Scoring by quarter: 26:14, 9:21, 14:17, 21:21
Pts: Olić 18; Rebs: Boričić 10; Asts: Gligić 5		Pts: Kmetovska 31; Rebs: Kmetovska 14; Asts: Kmetovska 8

Ranko Žeravica Sports Hall, Belgrade
Attendance: 50
Referees: Nožinović, Kasumović, Avdagić

27 October 2021
18:00

Report

Cinkarna Celje	122–50	RMU Banovići
Scoring by quarter: 33:8, 34:13, 2714, 28:15
Pts: Pardee 30; Rebs: Seničar 14; Asts: Čeh 10		Pts: Ibrić 13; Rebs: Ibrić, Hasanbegović 6 Asts: Kurtić 4

Hall Gimnazija Center Celje, Celje
Attendance: 100
Referees: Kovačević, Milković, Kumrić

27 October 2021
18:00

Report

Plamen Požega	82–77	Montana 2003
Scoring by quarter: 18:12, 22:14, 21:19, 21:32
Pts: Ivezić 23; Rebs: Kapinga Maweja 24; Asts: Griffin 5		Pts: Ivanova 31; Rebs: King 13; Asts: Okockyte-Balkojiene 8

Tomislav Pirc, Požega
Attendance: 50
Referees: Mali, Kovačević, Marčetić

=== Game 6 ===
3 November 2021
18:00

Report

Montana 2003	81–63	Badel 1862
Scoring by quarter: 2219, 25:11, 20:15, 14:18
Pts: Stoycheva 18; Rebs: Georgieva 14; Asts: Stoycheva 12		Pts: Kmetovska 17; Rebs: Trajčevska 10; Asts: Trajčevska 7

Mladost Hall, Montana
Attendance: 100
Referees: Vlahović, Orešković, Jovičin

4 November 2021
18:00

Report

Plamen Požega	101–53	RMU Banovići
Scoring by quarter: 21:19, 32:12, 28:11, 20:11
Pts: Kapinga Maweja 23; Rebs: Kapinga Maweja 12; Asts: Griffin 7		Pts: Ikanović 18; Rebs: three players 4 Asts: Kurtić 6

Tomislav Pirc, Požega
Attendance: 50
Referees: Miloradović, Ćirić, Pavlović

21 December 2021
18:00

Report

Cinkarna Celje	105–57	Partizan 1953
Scoring by quarter: 29:15, 30:21, 21:13, 25:8
Pts: Pardee 22; Rebs: Gbemuotor 10; Asts: Bartelme 6		Pts: Boričić, Samardžić 11; Rebs: Gligić, Boričić 5 Asts: Davinić 5

Hall Gimnazija Center Celje, Celje
Attendance: 100
Referees: Kovačević, Kumrić, Markušić

=== Game 7 ===
25 November 2021
18:00

Report

Cinkarna Celje	98–59	Badel 1862
Scoring by quarter: 29:18, 25:18, 18:12, 26:11
Pts: Pardee 20; Rebs: Seničar 11; Asts: Debeljak, Seničar 5		Pts: Kmetovska 21; Rebs: Trajčevska 11; Asts: Dimitrijević 5

Hall Gimnazija Center Celje, Celje
Attendance: 50
Referees: Adamović, Srdić, Dojčinović

24 November 2021
18:00

Report

Partizan 1953	67–78	Plamen Požega
Scoring by quarter: 8:19, 22:18, 17:15, 20:26
Pts: Boričić 17; Rebs: Boričić 8 Asts: Marjanović 5		Pts: Ivezić 26; Rebs: Kapinga Maweja 29; Asts: Griffin

Ranko Žeravica Sports Hall, Belgrade
Attendance: 50
Referees: Pelja, Bajgorić, Hasić

7 October 2021
18:00

Report

RMU Banovići	39–99	Montana 2003
Scoring by quarter: 12:34, 4:30, 4:21, 19:14
Pts: Dragićević 19; Rebs: Lačić 6 Asts: Dragićević 2		Pts: Angelova 19; Rebs: Natskina 13; Asts: Okockyte-Balkojiene 7

Mladost Hall, Montana
Attendance: /
Referees: Vlahović, Tomić, Jovičin

=== Game 8 ===
1 December 2021
19:00

Report

Badel 1862	85–55	RMU Banovići
Scoring by quarter: 32:11, 20:20, 19:5, 14:19
Pts: Stojanovska 30; Rebs: Mathieu 11; Asts: Dimitrijević 10		Pts: Lačić 18; Rebs: Popović 7 Asts: Kurtić 5

Nezavisna Makedonija, Skopje
Attendance: 100
Referees: Ilić, Zdravković, Ljubić

1 December 2021
18:00

Report

Montana 2003	81–68	Partizan 1953
Scoring by quarter: 24:18, 15:20, 18:17, 24:13
Pts: Georgieva 23; Rebs: King 13; Asts: Okockyte-Balkojiene 11		Pts: Boričić 19; Rebs: Marjanović 5 Asts: Olić 7

Mladost Hall, Montana
Attendance: 300
Referees: Hartman, Andrić, Buhin

1 December 2021
18:00

Report

Plamen Požega	73–80	Cinkarna Celje
Scoring by quarter: 16:21, 16:17, 21:22, 20:20
Pts: Kapinga Maweja 22; Rebs: Kapinga Maweja 14; Asts: Kešeljević 5		Pts: Debeljak 21; Rebs: Seničar 11; Asts: Čeh 4

Tomislav Pirc, Požega
Attendance: 50
Referees: Vlahović, Miloradović, Petković

=== Game 9 ===
8 December 2021
18:00

Report

Plamen Požega	94–63	Badel 1862
Scoring by quarter: 27:10, 26:29, 27:9, 14:15
Pts: Kapinga Maweja 22; Rebs: Kapinga Maweja 20; Asts: Ivezić 7		Pts: Kmetovska 21; Rebs: Mathieu 9 Asts: Trajčevska 3

Tomislav Pirc, Požega
Attendance: 50
Referees: Adamović, Srdić, Vavan

8 December 2021
18:00

Report

Cinkarna Celje	77–51	Montana 2003
Scoring by quarter: 26:12, 184, 16:19, 17:16
Pts: Ramona 24; Rebs: Ramona 9 Asts: Čeh, Ramona 5		Pts: King 14; Rebs: Stoycheva 5 Asts: Okockyte-Balkojiene 4

Hall Gimnazija Center Celje, Celje
Attendance: 150
Referees: Glavurdić, Čopić, Ljolje

8 December 2021
18:00

Report

Partizan 1953	80–58	RMU Banovići
Scoring by quarter: 23:9, 27:17, 20:18, 10:14
Pts: Marjanović 15; Rebs: Boričić 9 Asts: Gligić, Davinić 5		Pts: Ibrić 15; Rebs: Kurtić, Dragićević 8 Asts: Kurtić 5

Ranko Žeravica Sports Hall, Belgrade
Attendance: 30
Referees: Holjevac, Kelava, Sola

=== Game 10 ===
15 December 2021
20:00

Report

Badel 1862	58–46	Partizan 1953
Scoring by quarter: 15:16, 19:8, 13:6, 11:16
Pts: Kmetovska 20; Rebs: Trajčevska 13; Asts: Trajčevska 4		Pts: Boričić, Davinić 8 Rebs: Marjanović 11; Asts: Davinić 2

Nezavisna Makedonija, Skopje
Attendance: 100
Referees: Kuburović, Lakićević, Đikanović

15 December 2021
18:00

Report

RMU Banovići	46–106	Cinkarna Celje
Scoring by quarter: 9:22, 14:32, 14:32, 9,20
Pts: Ikanović 16; Rebs: Ikanović, Dragićević 3 Asts: Hasanbegović 5		Pts: Debeljak 28; Rebs: Seničar 13; Asts: Seničar, Anžič 3

SKC Banovići, Banovići
Attendance: 100
Referees: Vlahović, Miloradović, Ćirić

15 December 2021
18:00

Report

Montana 2003	89–84	Plamen Požega
Scoring by quarter: 23:24, 25:21, 18:21, 23:18
Pts: Ivanova 28; Rebs: King 17; Asts: Stoycheva, Okockyte-Balkojiene 9		Pts: Kapinga Maweja 28; Rebs: Kapinga Maweja 19; Asts: three players 6

Mladost Hall, Montana
Attendance: 200
Referees: Mali, Kovačević, Marčetić
