= 2023–24 WABA League Group A =

Group A of the WABA League is due to take place between 20 September 2023 and 20 December 2023. The three best ranked teams will advance to the SuperLeague.

By decision of the league board, Plamen Požega and Lavovi Brčko are excluded from further competition.

== Standings ==
Pos	Team	Pld	W	L	PF	PA	PD	Pts	Qualification or relegation
1	(Slovenia) Cinkarna Celje	10	10	0	1067	574	+493	20	Advance to SuperLeague
2	(Bosnia and Herzegovina) Orlovi	10	8	2	832	693	+139	18	Advance to SuperLeague
3	(Serbia) Partizan 1953	10	5	5	766	746	+20	15	Advance to SuperLeague
4	(Croatia) Plamen Požega	10	3	7	649	884	−235	13	
5	(Bosnia and Herzegovina) Lavovi Brčko	10	2	8	517	733	−216	12	
6	(Austria) UBI Graz	10	2	8	636	837	−201	12	

Updated to match(es) played on December 20, 2023. Source: WABA League

== Fixtures and results ==
All times given below are in Central European Time (for the match played in Bulgaria is time expressed in Eastern European Time).

=== Game 1 ===
4 October 2023
18:00

Report

Orlovi	71–67	Partizan 1953
Scoring by quarter: 21:22, 16:12, 22:11, 12:22
Pts: Šobot 17; Rebs: Zorić 11; Asts: Zorić, Šobot 3		Pts: Marojević 17; Rebs: Marojević 7 Asts: Davinić 4

Obilićevo Hall, Banja Luka
Attendance: 150
Referees: Grubišić, Lipovac, Holjevac

1 October 2023
17:00

Report

Lavovi Brčko	49–47	UBI Graz
Scoring by quarter: 15:15, 13:7, 9:11, 12:14
Pts: Halilović 18; Rebs: Đokić 10; Asts: Fajardo 3		Pts: Sill 14; Rebs: Sill 9 Asts: Sill 3

Brčko Technical School, Brčko
Attendance: 100
Referees: n/a

4 October 2023
19:00

Report

Cinkarna Celje	124–50	Plamen Požega
Scoring by quarter: 34:11, 26:23, 34:4, 30:12
Pts: Becker 25; Rebs: Gbemuotor 15; Asts: Čeh 10		Pts: three players 10; Rebs: Hrmić, Vučković 4 Asts: Lowery, Kujundžić 2

Hall Gimnazija Center Celje, Celje
Attendance: 100
Referees: Srdić, Vavan, Simić

=== Game 2 ===
11 October 2023
18:00

Report

Partizan 1953	94–60	Plamen Požega
Scoring by quarter: 27:17, 28:15, 21:14, 18:14
Pts: Boričić 17; Rebs: Dinčić, Kovandžić 12; Asts: Stojić 9		Pts: Vučković 20; Rebs: Vučković 6 Asts: Vučković 5

Ranko Žeravica Sports Hall, Belgrade
Attendance: 23
Referees: Skenderija, Vavan, Vuruna

10 October 2023
19:00

Report

UBI Graz	61–117	Cinkarna Celje
Scoring by quarter: 14:22, 13:40, 17:27, 17:28
Pts: Čić 14; Rebs: Sill, Čić 7 Asts: Schwarzinger 4		Pts: Becker 22; Rebs: Becker 11; Asts: Bartelme 10

Raiffeisen Sportpark, Graz
Attendance: 125
Referees: Pavičić, Muhvić, Beganović

11 October 2023
18:00

Report

Orlovi	70–48	Lavovi Brčko
Scoring by quarter: 14:10, 16:12, 27:9, 13:17
Pts: Mužević 27; Rebs: Mužević 10; Asts: Mitrović 8		Pts: Padilla 14; Rebs: Fajardo 13; Asts: Đokić 4

Obilićevo Hall, Banja Luka
Attendance: 100
Referees: Hašić, Kadrić, Fočo

=== Game 3 ===
18 October 2023
20:00

Report

Lavovi Brčko	63–73	Partizan 1953
Scoring by quarter: 19:20, 15:16, 15:19, 14:18
Pts: Došić 16; Rebs: Fajardo 14; Asts: Padilla 5		Pts: Boričić 17; Rebs: Boričić 19; Asts: Stojić 11

Brčko Technical School, Brčko
Attendance: 250
Referees: Hartman, Andrić, Žulj

18 October 2023
19:00

Report

Cinkarna Celje	95–80	Orlovi
Scoring by quarter: 24:30, 29:13, 20:14, 22:23
Pts: Becker 27; Rebs: Becker, Silva 8 Asts: Čeh 9		Pts: Mužević 26; Rebs: Predojević 9 Asts: Zorić 6

Hall Gimnazija Center Celje, Celje
Attendance: 150
Referees: Peić, Mustapić, Muhvić

20 September 2023
18:00

Report

Plamen Požega	62–71	UBI Graz
Scoring by quarter: 21:20, 11:13, 23:14, 7:24
Pts: Vučković 19; Rebs: Podrug 12; Asts: Lowery 7		Pts: Sill 19; Rebs: Sill 14; Asts: Čić 7

Tomislav Pirc Hall, Požega
Attendance: 50
Referees: Skenderija, Srdić, Danilović

=== Game 4 ===
26 October 2023
14:30

Report

Partizan 1953	99–74	UBI Graz
Scoring by quarter: 18:15, 31:17, 24:24, 26:18
Pts: B. Miškić 19; Rebs: Dinčić, Boričić 7 Asts: Stojić, Davinić 8		Pts: Sill 25; Rebs: Sill 14; Asts: Schwarzinger 9

Ranko Žeravica Sports Hall, Belgrade
Attendance: 50
Referees: Hašić, Bambur, Anida Ćorović

25 October 2023
17:30

Report

Orlovi	108–75	Plamen Požega
Scoring by quarter: 22:18, 27:17, 30:19, 29:21
Pts: Šobot 31; Rebs: Predojević 7 Asts: Mužević 8		Pts: Kešeljević 26; Rebs: Podrug 10; Asts: Kešeljević 7

Obilićevo Hall, Banja Luka
Attendance: 100
Referees: Kovačević, Luković, Karanović

25 October 2023
19:00

Report

Lavovi Brčko	49–106	Cinkarna Celje
Scoring by quarter: 15:35, 12:22, 9:22, 13:27
Pts: Halilović 11; Rebs: Đokić, Padilla 4 Asts: Padilla 3		Pts: Silva 25; Rebs: Jelenc 9 Asts: Silva 6

Brčko Technical School, Brčko
Attendance: 100
Referees: Miloradović, Gudžulić, Krivokuća

=== Game 5 ===
1 November 2023
19:00

Report

Cinkarna Celje	108–50	Partizan 1953
Scoring by quarter: 35:14, 22:15, 26:9, 25:12
Pts: Silva 21; Rebs: Bartelme, Jelenc 9 Asts: Bartelme 5		Pts: Jovanović 13; Rebs: Marojević 6 Asts: Stojić 3

Hall Gimnazija Center Celje, Celje
Attendance: 250
Referees: Peić, Pavičić, Muhvić

1 November 2023
18:00

Report

Plamen Požega	78–72	Lavovi Brčko
Scoring by quarter: 27:23, 12:19, 22:18, 17:12
Pts: Ivezić 33; Rebs: Kešeljević 11; Asts: Kešeljević 7		Pts: Fajardo 26; Rebs: Došić 8 Asts: Fajardo 5

Tomislav Pirc Hall, Požega
Attendance: 100
Referees: Bogojević, Marčetić, Kovačević

1 November 2023
19:00

Report

UBI Graz	72–101	Orlovi
Scoring by quarter: 14:26, 21:26, 22:33, 15:16
Pts: Schwarzinger 16; Rebs: Schwarzinger 7 Asts: Bischof 5		Pts: Šobot 30; Rebs: Zorić 9 Asts: Mitrović, Mužević 7

Raiffeisen Sportpark, Graz
Attendance: 140
Referees: Javor, Milanović, Rebeušek

=== Game 6 ===
22 November 2023
18:00

Report

Partizan 1953	57–71	Orlovi
Scoring by quarter: 17:17, 18:17, 9:14, 13:23
Pts: Marojević 13; Rebs: Dinčić 10; Asts: Davinić 7		Pts: Mužević 24; Rebs: Predojević 10; Asts: Mužević, Šobot 4

Ranko Žeravica Sports Hall, Belgrade
Attendance: 40
Referees: Grubišić, Andrić, Žulj

21 November 2023
19:00

Report

UBI Graz	53–58	Lavovi Brčko
Scoring by quarter: 11:12, 12:17, 16:17, 14:12
Pts: Sill 13; Rebs: Sill 7 Asts: Schwarzinger 5		Pts: Karišik 16; Rebs: Fajardo 13; Asts: Došić 4

Raiffeisen Sportpark, Graz
Attendance: 90
Referees: Terlević, Koraca, Žagar

22 November 2023
18:00

Report

Plamen Požega	58–113	Cinkarna Celje
Scoring by quarter: 18:22, 12:33, 16:30, 12:28
Pts: Kešeljević 20; Rebs: Kešeljević 8 Asts: Kešeljević 7		Pts: Jelenc 20; Rebs: Jelenc 13; Asts: Uranker 8

Tomislav Pirc Hall, Požega
Attendance: 50
Referees: Srdić, Simić, Đukić

=== Game 7 ===
29 November 2023
18:00

Report

Plamen Požega	86–83	Partizan 1953
Scoring by quarter: 22:17, 27:17, 21:20, 16:29
Pts: Ivezić 28; Rebs: Podrug 13; Asts: Podrug 8		Pts: Boričić, Jovanović 18; Rebs: Jovanović 8 Asts: three players 4

Tomislav Pirc Hall, Požega
Attendance: 50
Referees: Skenderija, Vavan, Vuruna

28 November 2023
19:00

Report

Cinkarna Celje	113–47	UBI Graz
Scoring by quarter: 32:16, 22:7, 27:11, 32:13
Pts: Silva 19; Rebs: Demirović 8 Asts: Bartelme 13		Pts: Sill 18; Rebs: Oriakhi 12; Asts: Bischof 4

Hall Gimnazija Center Celje, Celje
Attendance: 60
Referees: Mustapić, Peić, Muhvić

29 November 2023
19:00

Report

Lavovi Brčko	48–69	Orlovi
Scoring by quarter: 15:17, 10:21, 12:15, 11:16
Pts: Padilla 13; Rebs: Fajardo 10; Asts: Padilla 4		Pts: Safiyah B. 25; Rebs: Šobot 12; Asts: Zorić 7

Brčko Technical School, Brčko
Attendance: 100
Referees: Nožinović, Kasumović, Jusufović

=== Game 8 ===
6 December 2023
18:30

Report

Partizan 1953	86–61	Lavovi Brčko
Scoring by quarter: 22:16, 19:11, 24:22, 21:12
Pts: Marojević 20; Rebs: Jovanović 9 Asts: Boričić 6		Pts: Padilla 15; Rebs: Halilović, Đokić 8 Asts: Đokić, Boričić 5

Ranko Žeravica Sports Hall, Belgrade
Attendance: 100
Referees: Grubišić, K. Holjevac, B. Holjevac

6 December 2023
20:00

Report

Orlovi	65–92	Cinkarna Celje
Scoring by quarter: 18:15, 13:27, 16:25, 18:25
Pts: Šobot 17; Rebs: Zorić 11; Asts: Mitrović 8		Pts: Čeh 22; Rebs: Becker 10; Asts: Čeh 5

Obilićevo Hall, Banja Luka
Attendance: 100
Referees: Marčetić, Kovačević, Luković

18 October 2023
18:00

Report

UBI Graz	85–63	Plamen Požega
Scoring by quarter: 21:23, 22:19, 20:11, 22:10
Pts: Maresch 20; Rebs: Sill, Ćić 8 Asts: Schwarzinger 8		Pts: Vučković 19; Rebs: Kešeljević 7 Asts: Kešeljević 4

Raiffeisen Sportpark, Graz
Attendance: 70
Referees: Savić, Rebeušek, Uranker

=== Game 9 ===
31 October 2023
19:00

Report

UBI Graz	60–82	Partizan 1953
Scoring by quarter: 13:25, 18:22, 17:18, 12:17
Pts: Sill 18; Rebs: Sill 10; Asts: Schwarzinger, Ćić 5		Pts: Marojević 19; Rebs: Stojić 7 Asts: Stojić 6

Raiffeisen Sportpark, Graz
Attendance: 90
Referees: Javor, Milanović, Rebeušek

13 December 2023
18:00

Report

Plamen Požega	73–104	Orlovi
Scoring by quarter: 25:28, 14:36, 21:20, 13:20
Pts: Lowery 24; Rebs: Bašić 4 Asts: Kešeljević 7		Pts: Safiyah B. 26; Rebs: Zorić, Safiyah B. 9 Asts: Šobot 9

Tomislav Pirc Hall, Požega
Attendance: 50
Referees: Kovačević, Gudžulić, Luković

13 December 2023
17:00

Report

Cinkarna Celje	107–39	Lavovi Brčko
Scoring by quarter: 32:11, 30:2, 23:14, 22:12
Pts: Žibert 18; Rebs: Gbemuotor 11; Asts: Uranker 10		Pts: Halilović 9 Rebs: Lazarević 5 Asts: three players 2

Hall Gimnazija Center Celje, Celje
Attendance: 100
Referees: Terlević, Koraca, Žagar

=== Game 10 ===
20 December 2023
16:30

Report

Partizan 1953	75–92	Cinkarna Celje
Scoring by quarter: 18:24, 14:19, 18:30, 25:19
Pts: Marojević 18; Rebs: Boričić 9 Asts: Boričić 5		Pts: Čeh 20; Rebs: Gbemuotor 8 Asts: Čeh 10

Vizura Hall, Belgrade
Attendance: 100
Referees: Pelja, Hašić, Brestovac

20 December 2023
19:00

Report

Lavovi Brčko	30–44	Plamen Požega
Scoring by quarter: 2:8, 6:12, 8:7, 14:17
Pts: Bekić 8 Rebs: Đokić 9 Asts: Došić 2		Pts: Berger, Uzelman 11; Rebs: Kujundžić 14; Asts: Bašić 1

Brčko Technical School, Brčko
Attendance: 10
Referees: Marčetić, Kovačević, Karanović

20 December 2023
18:30

Report

Orlovi	93–66	UBI Graz
Scoring by quarter: 27:11, 23:21, 16:17, 27:17
Pts: Šobot 24; Rebs: Safiyah B. 14; Asts: Mitrović 7		Pts: Sill 22; Rebs: Sill 9 Asts: Schwarzinger 4

Obilićevo Hall, Banja Luka
Attendance: 100
Referees: Muhvić, Čićin Šain, Capan
