= 2021–22 WABA League Group A =

Group A of the WABA League took place between 29 September 2021 and it will end on 15 December 2021.

The four best ranked teams advanced to the SuperLeague.

25 September 2021 Feniks Pale has withdraws from the 2021-22 WABA League. As per the Official Basketball Rules, all games were awarded to their respective opponents with a score of 20-0. Furthermore, the forfeiting team Feniks will receive 0 classification points in the standings.

== Standings ==
Pos	Team	Pld	W	L	PF	PA	PD	Pts	Qualification or relegation
1	(Montenegro) Budućnost Bemax	10	10	0	698	435	+263	20	Advance to SuperLeague
2	(Bosnia and Herzegovina) Orlovi	10	7	3	538	511	+27	17	Advance to SuperLeague
3	(Serbia) Vojvodina 021	10	6	4	596	505	+91	16	Advance to SuperLeague
4	(Slovenia) Triglav Kranj	10	5	5	538	549	−11	15	Advance to SuperLeague
5	(North Macedonia) KAM Basket	10	2	8	488	658	−170	12	Advance to Classification 9–12
6	(Bosnia and Herzegovina) Feniks Pale	10	0	10	0	200	−200	10	Advance to Classification 9–12

Updated to match(es) played on December 15, 2021. Source: WABA League

== Fixtures and results ==
All times given below are in Central European Time (for the match played in Bulgaria is time expressed in Eastern European Time).

=== Game 1 ===
29 September 2021
18:00

Report

KAM Basket	48–100	Vojvodina 021
Scoring by quarter: 24:25, 8:27, 10:32, 6:16
Pts: Adams 21; Rebs: Adams 18; Asts: Aleksić 3		Pts: Loomis 30; Rebs: Jovović 12; Asts: Vujisić 9

SRC Kale, Skopje
Attendance: /
Referees: Vuković, Kuburović, Ćetković

29 September 2021
17:00

Report

Orlovi	20–0	Feniks Pale

Obilićevo, Banja Luka
Attendance: /
Referees: Dojčinović, Adamović, Skenderija

30 September 2021
17:30

Report

Budućnost Bemax	87–51	Triglav Kranj
Scoring by quarter: 20:8, 24:12, 27:18, 16:13
Pts: Đorđević 14; Rebs: Đorđević 10; Asts: Živković 7		Pts: Kozina Bubnič 10; Rebs: Kozina Bubnič 7 Asts: Kozina Bubnič 4

Bemax Arena, Podgorica
Attendance: 100
Referees: Bajgorić, Hasić, Bambur

=== Game 2 ===
6 October 2021
16:30

Report

Vojvodina 021	58–85	Budućnost Bemax
Scoring by quarter: 21:22, 17:16, 10:17, 10:26
Pts: Loomis 20; Rebs: Loomis 9 Asts: Radulović, Loomis 3		Pts: Živković 30; Rebs: Đorđević 8 Asts: Leković 7

Petrovaradin Hall, Novi Sad
Attendance: 25
Referees: Hartman, Andrić, Holjevac

6 October 2021

Report

Feniks Pale	0–20	Triglav Kranj

Obilićevo, Banja Luka

6 November 2021
16:00

Report

KAM Basket	59–65	Orlovi
Scoring by quarter: 16:19, 9:12, 17:18, 17:16
Pts: Puljizović 23; Rebs: Adams 12; Asts: three players 2		Pts: Rajić 23; Rebs: Erak 18; Asts: Ristić 4

Kiril i Metodij Hall, Makedonska Kamenica
Attendance: 50
Referees: Vuković, Lakićević, Đikanović

=== Game 3 ===
13 October 2021
17:00

Report

Orlovi	67–58	Vojvodina 021
Scoring by quarter: 14:14, 23:12, 12:17, 18:15
Pts: Rajić 21; Rebs: Erak 16; Asts: Ristić 7		Pts: Prokić 15; Rebs: Jankokić 10; Asts: Prokić 9

Obilićevo Hall, Banja Luka
Attendance: 20
Referees: Mohorič, Krajnc, Letonje

13 October 2021
20:15

Report

Triglav Kranj	82–54	KAM Basket
Scoring by quarter: 22:13, 21:8, 19:16, 20:17
Pts: Pavlič 18; Rebs: three players 7 Asts: Abramovič 7		Pts: Adams, Aleksić 18; Rebs: Adams 16; Asts: Aleksić 6

Sports Hall Planina, Kranj
Attendance: 50
Referees: Miletić, Lenac, Pataca

13 October 2021

Report

Budućnost Bemax	20–0	Feniks Pale

Bemax Arena, Podgorica

=== Game 4 ===
20 October 2021

Report

Vojvodina 021	20–0	Feniks Pale

Petrovaradin Hall, Novi Sad

8 December 2021
18:30

Report

KAM Basket	61–87	Budućnost Bemax
Scoring by quarter: 10:26, 16:19, 14:21, 21:21
Pts: Adams 21; Rebs: Adams 14; Asts: Aleksić 6		Pts: Đorđeviž 16; Rebs: Đorđeviž 7 Asts: Živković 13

Bemax Arena, Podgorica
Attendance: 50
Referees: Kajan, Šutalo, Jurković

20 October 2021
17:00

Report

Orlovi	61–60	Triglav Kranj
Scoring by quarter: 16:17, 11:14, 20:17, 14:12
Pts: Rajić 19; Rebs: Erak 21; Asts: Ristić 6		Pts: Kozina Bubnič 24; Rebs: Kozina Bubnič 13; Asts: Abramovič 5

Obilićevo Hall, Banja Luka
Attendance: 60
Referees: Hartman, Andrić, Buhin

=== Game 5 ===
27 October 2021
20:15

Report

Triglav Kranj	61–68	Vojvodina 021
Scoring by quarter: 7:22, 11:17, 22:14, 21:15
Pts: Abramovič 21; Rebs: Kozina Bubnič 8 Asts: Vrečer 6		Pts: Jankokić 18; Rebs: Loomis 11; Asts: five players 2

Sports Hall Planina, Kranj
Attendance: 50
Referees: Stanković, Žagar, Matek

28 October 2021
17:30

Report

Budućnost Bemax	81–40	Orlovi
Scoring by quarter: 23:3, 21:11, 19:10, 18:16
Pts: Drobnjak 14; Rebs: Đorđević 8 Asts: Radonjić, Leković 5		Pts: Zeljković 13; Rebs: Erak 5 Asts: Erak, Ristić 4

Bemax Arena, Podgorica
Attendance: 100
Referees: Mitev, Červenka, Jakova

27 October 2021

Report

Feniks Pale	0–20	KAM Basket

Obilićevo, Banja Luka

=== Game 6 ===
11 November 2021
16:30

Report

Vojvodina 021	86–57	KAM Basket
Scoring by quarter: 18:12, 23:12, 25:17, 20:16
Pts: Loomis 19; Rebs: Jovanović 8 Asts: Radulović 5		Pts: Adams 23; Rebs: Puljizović 10; Asts: Puljizović, Aleksić 2

Petrovaradin Hall, Novi Sad
Attendance: 10
Referees: Grubišić, K. Holjevac, B. Holjevac

3 November 2021

Report

Feniks Pale	0–20	Orlovi

Obilićevo, Banja Luka

3 November 2021
20:15

Report

Triglav Kranj	49–81	Budućnost Bemax
Scoring by quarter: 12:23, 17:27, 11:25, 9:6
Pts: Abramovič 14; Rebs: Kramžar, Vrečer 5 Asts: Kramžar, Vrečer 3		Pts: Leković 16; Rebs: Đorđević 14; Asts: Živković 8

Sports Hall Planina, Kranj
Attendance: 50
Referees: Lenac, Zrnić, Baki

=== Game 7 ===
24 November 2021
18:30

Report

Budućnost Bemax	79–56	Vojvodina 021
Scoring by quarter: 24:18, 20:12, 21:13, 14:13
Pts: Đorđević 18; Rebs: Živković 7 Asts: Leković 5		Pts: Janković 14; Rebs: Janković 8 Asts: Jovanović, Loomis 5

Bemax Arena, Podgorica
Attendance: 100
Referees: Vlaho, Lovrić, Brekalo

24 November 2021
20:15

Report

Triglav Kranj	20–0	Feniks Pale

Sports Hall Planina, Kranj

24 November 2021
17:00

Report

Orlovi	77–49	KAM Basket
Scoring by quarter: 23:7, 17:20, 18:13, 19:9
Pts: Trebovac 21; Rebs: Erak 12; Asts: Ristić 9		Pts: Tasevska 12; Rebs: Puljizović, Adams 8 Asts: Aleksić 4

Obilićevo Hall, Banja Luka
Attendance: 20
Referees: Mauer, Kuzmin, Blaško

=== Game 8 ===
1 December 2021
16:30

Report

Vojvodina 021	59–61	Orlovi
Scoring by quarter: 20:12, 10:15, 20:12, 9:22
Pts: Prokić 17; Rebs: Prokić 6 Asts: Prokić 5		Pts: Zeljković 20; Rebs: Erak 10; Asts: Ristić 5

Petrovaradin Hall, Novi Sad
Attendance: 75
Referees: Glavurdić, Čopić, Ljolje

30 November 2021
15:00

Report

KAM Basket	74–78	Triglav Kranj
Scoring by quarter: 13:26, 17:16, 24:26, 20:10
Pts: Adams 20; Rebs: Adams 10; Asts: Mitreva 4		Pts: Kramžar 16; Rebs: Burgar 9 Asts: Kvrgić 7

Kiril i Metodij Hall, Makedonska Kamenica
Attendance: 50
Referees: Kuburović, Ćetković, Đikanović

1 December 2021

Report

Feniks Pale	0–20	Budućnost Bemax

Obilićevo, Banja Luka

=== Game 9 ===
8 December 2021

Report

Feniks Pale	0–20	Vojvodina 021

Obilićevo, Banja Luka

9 December 2021
18:30

Report

Budućnost Bemax	83–46	KAM Basket
Scoring by quarter: 17:11, 20:12, 25:9, 21:14
Pts: Đorđević 21; Rebs: three players 7 Asts: Leković 6		Pts: Adams 16; Rebs: Adams 19; Asts: Aleksić 7

Bemax Arena, Podgorica
Attendance: 50
Referees: Kajan, Šutalo, Jurković

8 December 2021
20:15

Report

Triglav Kranj	66–53	Orlovi
Scoring by quarter: 14:14, 10:14, 23:9, 19:16
Pts: Vrečer 24; Rebs: Vrečer 15; Asts: Vrečer 6		Pts: Zeljković 19; Rebs: Erak, Zeljković 7 Asts: Ristić 5

Sports Hall Planina, Kranj
Attendance: 20
Referees: Stanković, Miletić, Matek

=== Game 10 ===
15 December 2021
16:30

Report

Vojvodina 021	71–51	Triglav Kranj
Scoring by quarter: 27:10, 16:20, 11:16, 17:5
Pts: Loomis 24; Rebs: Loomis 10; Asts: Prokić 5		Pts: Allen 18; Rebs: Kozina Bubnič 6 Asts: Pavlič, Allen 3

Petrovaradin Hall, Novi Sad
Attendance: 30
Referees: Pelja, Bajgorić, Hasić

15 December 2021
17:00

Report

Orlovi	74–79 (OT)	Budućnost Bemax
Scoring by quarter: 13:24, 17:10, 17:18, 25:2, Overtime: 2:7
Pts: Zeljković 26; Rebs: Erak 17; Asts: Trebovac 6		Pts: Leković 21; Rebs: Đorđević 13; Asts: Leković 7

Obilićevo, Banja Luka
Attendance: 10
Referees: Hartman, Grubišić, Holjevac

15 December 2021

Report

KAM Basket	20–0	Feniks Pale

Kiril i Metodij Hall, Makedonska Kamenica
