= 2023–24 WABA League =

WABA League
- Season: 2023–24
- Duration: September 20, 2023 – December 20, 2023 (Regular season); January 9, 2024 – March 6, 2024 (SuperLeague); 23–24 March 2024 (Final Four)
- Teams: 12
- All statistics correct as of March 9, 2024.

The 2023–24 WABA League is the 23nd season of the Adriatic League. Competition included twelve teams from seven countries. In this season participating clubs from Serbia, Montenegro, Bosnia and Herzegovina, Bulgaria, Austria, Croatia and Slovenia.

On 30 November 2023, Nikšić informed the Board of the WABA League that due to financial and other problems (seriously threatened health of the coach and frequent illnesses of the players), it is not able to play the remaining four games of the 2023–24 WABA League Group Stage.

By decision of the league board, Plamen Požega and Lavovi Brčko are excluded from further competition.

== Teams ==
=== Team allocation ===
Regular season
(Bulgaria) Montana 2003	(Montenegro) Nikšić	(Bosnia and Herzegovina) Orlovi	(Bosnia and Herzegovina) RMU Banovići
(Slovenia) Cinkarna Celje	(Montenegro) Budućnost Bemax	(Bosnia and Herzegovina) Lavovi Brčko	(Austria) UBI Graz
(Croatia) Plamen Požega	(Serbia) Partizan 1953	(Serbia) Duga Šabac	(Serbia) Sloga Požega

=== Venues and locations ===
Location of teams in the 2023–24 WABA League
Location of teams in the 2023–24 WABA League
Location of teams in 2023–24 WABA League

Team	Home city	Arena	Capacity
Budućnost Bemax	Podgorica	Bemax Arena	2,500
Cinkarna Celje	Celje	Gimnazija Center Celje Hall	1,500
Duga Šabac	Šabac	Šabac Gymnasium Hall	
Lavovi Brčko	Brčko	Brčko Technical School	
Montana 2003	Montana	Mladost Sports Hall	
Nikšić	Nikšić	Sports center Nikšić	
Orlovi	Banja Luka	Obilićevo Hall	600
Partizan 1953	Beograd	Ranko Žeravica Sports Hall	5,000
Plamen Požega	Požega	Tomislav Pirc Hall	
RMU Banovići	Banovići	SKC Banovići	
Sloga Požega	Požega	Sports Hall Požega	
UBI Graz	Graz	Raiffeisen Sportpark	3,000

== Regular season ==
In the Regular season was played with 12 teams divided into 2 groups of 6 teams and play a dual circuit system, each with one game each at home and away. The four best teams in each group at the end of the regular season were placed in the SuperLeague. The regular season began on 20 September 2023 and it will end on 20 December 2023.

=== Group A ===
Pos	Team	Pld	W	L	PF	PA	PD	Pts	Qualification or relegation
1	(Slovenia) Cinkarna Celje	10	10	0	1067	574	+493	20	Advance to SuperLeague
2	(Bosnia and Herzegovina) Orlovi	10	8	2	832	693	+139	18	Advance to SuperLeague
3	(Serbia) Partizan 1953	10	5	5	766	746	+20	15	Advance to SuperLeague
4	(Croatia) Plamen Požega	10	3	7	649	884	−235	13	
5	(Bosnia and Herzegovina) Lavovi Brčko	10	2	8	517	733	−216	12	
6	(Austria) UBI Graz	10	2	8	636	837	−201	12	

Updated to match(es) played on December 20, 2023. Source: WABA League

=== Group B ===
Pos	Team	Pld	W	L	PF	PA	PD	Pts	Qualification or relegation
1	(Montenegro) Budućnost Bemax	8	8	0	693	445	+248	16	Advance to SuperLeague
2	(Bulgaria) Montana 2003	8	5	3	674	528	+146	13	Advance to SuperLeague
3	(Serbia) Sloga Požega	8	4	4	573	508	+65	12	Advance to SuperLeague
4	(Serbia) Duga Šabac	8	3	5	491	577	−86	11	Advance to SuperLeague
5	(Bosnia and Herzegovina) RMU Banovići	8	0	8	415	788	−373	8	
6	(Montenegro) Nikšić	0	0	0	0	0	0	0	

Updated to match(es) played on December 20, 2023. Source: WABA League

== SuperLeague ==
In the SuperLeague was played with 7 teams and play a dual circuit system, each with one game each at home and away. The four best teams in SuperLeague at the end of the last round were placed on the Final Four. The SuperLeague began on 9 January 2024 and it will end on 6 March 2024.

Pos	Team	Pld	W	L	PF	PA	PD	Pts	Qualification or relegation
1	(Montenegro) Budućnost Bemax	12	11	1	942	740	+202	23	Advance to the Final Four
2	(Slovenia) Cinkarna Celje	12	11	1	1054	749	+305	23	Advance to the Final Four
3	(Bosnia and Herzegovina) Orlovi	12	6	6	830	898	−68	18	Advance to the Final Four
4	(Serbia) Sloga Požega	12	5	7	787	858	−71	17	Advance to the Final Four
5	(Serbia) Partizan 1953	12	4	8	882	955	−73	16	
6	(Bulgaria) Montana 2003	12	4	8	840	907	−67	16	
7	(Serbia) Duga Šabac	12	1	11	755	983	−228	13	

Updated to match(es) played on March 6, 2024. Source: WABA League

== Final Four ==
Final Four will be held on 23–24 March 2024 in Podgorica, Montenegro.

Semifinals
23 March 2024
(Montenegro) Budućnost Bemax	.
(Serbia) Sloga Požega	.
23 March 2024
(Slovenia) Cinkarna Celje	.
(Bosnia and Herzegovina) Orlovi	.

Final
24 March 2024
.	.
.	.
Third place
24 March 2024
.	.
.	.

2023–24 Adriatic League champion

.
? title

== See also ==
- 2023–24 ABA League First Division
- 2023–24 First Women's Basketball League of Serbia
