= 2021–22 WABA League SuperLeague =

SuperLeague of the WABA League took place between 5 January 2022 and it will end on 15 March 2022.

The four best ranked teams advanced to the Final Four. The points against teams from the same preliminary round were taken over.

== Standings ==
Pos	Team	Pld	W	L	PF	PA	PD	Pts	Qualification or relegation
1	(Montenegro) Budućnost Bemax	14	13	1	1107	832	+275	27	Advance to the Final Four
2	(Slovenia) Cinkarna Celje	14	12	2	1124	883	+241	26	Advance to the Final Four
3	(Bosnia and Herzegovina) Orlovi	14	8	6	944	991	−47	22	Advance to the Final Four
4	(Bulgaria) Montana 2003	14	8	6	1013	1023	−10	22	Advance to the Final Four
5	(Serbia) Vojvodina 021	14	7	7	973	918	+55	21	
6	(Croatia) Plamen Požega	14	4	10	1035	1192	−157	18	
7	(Slovenia) Triglav Kranj	14	3	11	857	991	−134	17	
8	(North Macedonia) Badel 1862	14	1	13	855	1078	−223	15	

Updated to match(es) played on March 15, 2022. Source: WABA League

== Fixtures and results ==
All times given below are in Central European Time (for the match played in Bulgaria is time expressed in Eastern European Time).

=== Game 1 ===
5 January 2022
18:30

Report

Budućnost Bemax	69–64	Badel 1862
Scoring by quarter: 13:12, 11:18, 13:19, 32:15
Pts: Đorđević 25; Rebs: Đorđević 18; Asts: Živković, Leković 6		Pts: Kmetovska 29; Rebs: Kmetovska 9 Asts: Trajčevska 6

Bemax Arena, Podgorica
Attendance: 50
Referees: Radanović, Komar, Kovačević

9 February 2022
16:00

Report

Orlovi	77–63	Plamen Požega
Scoring by quarter: 28:12, 17:23, 16:19, 16:9
Pts: Šobot 25; Rebs: Erak 11; Asts: Zeljković 9		Pts: Kapinga Maweja 23; Rebs: Kapinga Maweja 14; Asts: Ivezić, Kešeljević 4

Obilićevo Hall, Banja Luka
Attendance: 50
Referees: Vlahović, Orešković, Jovičin

5 January 2022
16:30

Report

Vojvodina 021	75–67	Montana 2003
Scoring by quarter: 16:13, 20:21, 16:23, 23:10
Pts: Loomis 27; Rebs: Loomis 15; Asts: Vujisić 7		Pts: Okockyte-Balkojiene 23; Rebs: Georgieva 10; Asts: Okockyte-Balkojiene 8

Petrovaradin Hall, Novi Sad
Attendance: 30
Referees: Pelja, Bajgorić, Hasić

5 January 2022
18:00

Report

Cinkarna Celje	69–45	Triglav Kranj
Scoring by quarter: 24:6, 14:18, 13:12, 18:9
Pts: Bartelme, Ramona 16; Rebs: Seničar 12; Asts: Seničar 6		Pts: Abramovič 14; Rebs: Kozina Bubnič 10; Asts: four players 2

Hall Gimnazija Center Celje, Celje
Attendance: 100
Referees: Gajšek, Mohorič, Letonje

=== Game 2 ===
7 February 2022
18:00

Report

Montana 2003	64–52	Triglav Kranj
Scoring by quarter: 16:9, 15:19, 19:11, 14:13
Pts: Okockyte-Balkojiene 22; Rebs: King 11; Asts: Stoycheva 5		Pts: Kramžar 16; Rebs: Kramžar, Vrečer 7 Asts: Vrečer 6

Hall Park, Kragujevac
Attendance: 30
Referees: Miloradović, Kovačević, Kral

12 January 2022
18:00

Report

Plamen Požega	68–81	Vojvodina 021
Scoring by quarter: 21:24, 12:21, 11:21, 24:14
Pts: Kapinga Maweja 23; Rebs: Ivezić, Podrug 9 Asts: Kešeljević 5		Pts: Jovović 24; Rebs: Janković 11; Asts: Prokić 6

Tomislav Pirc, Požega
Attendance: 50
Referees: Adamović, Srdić, Dojčinović

16 February 2022
19:00

Report

Badel 1862	65–70	Orlovi
Scoring by quarter: 14:11, 13:19, 20:21, 18:19
Pts: Dimova 22; Rebs: Dimova 10; Asts: Trajčevska 7		Pts: Šobot 21; Rebs: Ristić 9 Asts: Svitlica, Rajić 4

Nezavisna Makedonija, Skopje
Attendance: 100
Referees: Krstić, Zdravković, Ilić

28 January 2022
18:00

Report

Cinkarna Celje	75–67	Budućnost Bemax
Scoring by quarter: 25:20, 15:14, 18:17, 17:16
Pts: Ramona 26; Rebs: Seničar 8 Asts: Seničar 5		Pts: Đorđević 24; Rebs: Đorđević 17; Asts: Živković 6

Hall Gimnazija Center Celje, Celje
Attendance: 120
Referees: Glavurdić, Ćopić, Ljolje

=== Game 3 ===
19 January 2022
16:30

Report

Vojvodina 021	79–55	Badel 1862
Scoring by quarter: 23:7, 25:16, 11:19, 20:13
Pts: Loomis 22; Rebs: Loomis 13; Asts: Radulović 3		Pts: Kmetovska 22; Rebs: Stojanovska 9 Asts: Trajčevska 5

Petrovaradin Hall, Novi Sad
Attendance: 30
Referees: Hartman, Holjevac, Barišić

4 March 2022
18:30

Report

Budućnost Bemax	76–57	Montana 2003
Scoring by quarter: 12:10, 19:15, 22:18, 23:14
Pts: Živković 16; Rebs: Lazarević 13; Asts: three players 4		Pts: Georgieva 16; Rebs: Georgieva, Ivanova 6 Asts: Okockyte-Balkojiene 8

Bemax Arena, Podgorica
Attendance: 300
Referees: Vlaho, Šutalo, Jurković

19 January 2022
17:00

Report

Orlovi	73–84	Cinkarna Celje
Scoring by quarter: 24:27, 15:24, 10:20, 24:13
Pts: Svitlica 20; Rebs: Rajić 9 Asts: Ristić 9		Pts: Ramona 19; Rebs: Seničar 9 Asts: Seničar 6

Obilićevo Hall, Banja Luka
Attendance: 50
Referees: Miloradović, Kovačević, Kral

19 January 2022
20:15

Report

Triglav Kranj	102–81	Plamen Požega
Scoring by quarter: 32:22, 23:24, 28:16, 19:19
Pts: Abramovič 22; Rebs: Kozina Bubnič 6 Asts: three players 6		Pts: Ivezić 27; Rebs: Podrug, Kapinga Maweja 4 Asts: Ivezić, Bašić 4

Sports Hall Planina, Kranj
Attendance: /
Referees: Adamović, Skenderija, Vavan

=== Game 4 ===
25 January 2022
19:30

Report

Badel 1862	69–44	Triglav Kranj
Scoring by quarter: 26:10, 10:19, 18:4, 15:11
Pts: Maksimovska, Trajčevska 15; Rebs: Mathieu 10; Asts: Maksimovska 5		Pts: Pavlič, Vrečer 11; Rebs: Kozina Bubnič 8 Asts: Vrečer 9

Nezavisna Makedonija, Skopje
Attendance: 50
Referees: Krstić, Zdravković, Ilić

30 January 2022
17:00

Report

Cinkarna Celje	82–71	Vojvodina 021
Scoring by quarter: 23:26, 20:15, 18:21, 21:9
Pts: Ramona 29; Rebs: Seničar 10; Asts: Seničar 8		Pts: Loomis 21; Rebs: Loomis 15; Asts: Janković 4

Hall Gimnazija Center Celje, Celje
Attendance: 100
Referees: Terlević, Stanković, Sušanj

26 January 2022
18:00

Report

Montana 2003	75–71	Orlovi
Scoring by quarter: 29:17, 18:19, 18:19, 10:16
Pts: Ivanova 31; Rebs: King, Georgieva 12; Asts: Okockyte-Balkojiene 5		Pts: Rajić 16; Rebs: Erak, Svitlica 12; Asts: Svitlica 5

Mladost Hall, Montana
Attendance: 100
Referees: Vlahović, Petković, Kral

30 January 2022
18:00

Report

Plamen Požega	77–112	Budućnost Bemax
Scoring by quarter: 26:25, 17:39, 17:23, 17:25
Pts: Kapinga Maweja 27; Rebs: Kapinga Maweja 13; Asts: Kešeljević 11		Pts: Đorđević 22; Rebs: Marković 9 Asts: Živković, Savković 10

Bemax Arena, Podgorica
Attendance: 50
Referees: Radanović, Komar, Kovačević

=== Game 5 ===
3 February 2022
19:00

Report

Badel 1862	59–67	Budućnost Bemax
Scoring by quarter: 24:14, 20:19, 6:21, 9:13
Pts: Stojanovska 18; Rebs: Mathieu 8 Asts: Stojanovska 4		Pts: Đorđević 15; Rebs: Đorđević 10; Asts: Živković 5

Nezavisna Makedonija, Skopje
Attendance: 100
Referees: Bogojević, Kovačević, Ljubić

3 February 2022
18:00

Report

Plamen Požega	77–84	Orlovi
Scoring by quarter: 14:18, 22:26, 31:15, 10:25
Pts: Ivezić 24; Rebs: Kapinga Maweja 11; Asts: Podrug 7		Pts: Rajić 27; Rebs: Erak 11; Asts: Rajić 6

Tomislav Pirc, Požega
Attendance: 50
Referees: Kral, Mali, Marčetić

3 February 2022
18:00

Report

Montana 2003	74–59	Vojvodina 021
Scoring by quarter: 15:6, 21:23, 24:9, 14:21
Pts: Georgieva 18; Rebs: Georgieva 14; Asts: Okockyte-Balkojiene 9		Pts: Loomis 21; Rebs: Loomis 9 Asts: Prokić 4

Mladost Hall, Montana
Attendance: 200
Referees: Hartman, Holjevac, Andrić

2 February 2022
20:15

Report

Triglav Kranj	50–68	Cinkarna Celje
Scoring by quarter: 20:17, 10:18, 11:17, 9:16
Pts: Kozina Bubnič 17; Rebs: Kozina Bubnič, Kramžar 9 Asts: Kramžar 4		Pts: Ramona 18; Rebs: Gbemuotor 8 Asts: Čeh 3

Sports Hall Planina, Kranj
Attendance: 50
Referees: Pipan, Gajšek, Škrbec

=== Game 6 ===
8 February 2022
14:00

Report

Triglav Kranj	82–87	Montana 2003
Scoring by quarter: 13:15, 25:28, 23:28, 21:16
Pts: Kramžar 25; Rebs: Kozina Bubnič 8 Asts: Kramžar 10		Pts: Okockyte-Balkojiene 24; Rebs: King 12; Asts: Stoycheva 8

Hall Park, Kragujevac
Attendance: 30
Referees: Petković, Kovačević, Ćirić

8 March 2022
16:30

Report

Vojvodina 021	96–50	Plamen Požega
Scoring by quarter: 32:12, 23:7, 23:17, 18:14
Pts: Jovović 14; Rebs: Marić, La. Radulović 8 Asts: Le. Radulović 5		Pts: Kapinga Maweja 20; Rebs: Kapinga Maweja 12; Asts: Bašić 3

Petrovaradin Hall, Novi Sad
Attendance: 20
Referees: Adamović, Srdić, Dojčinović

23 February 2022
17:00

Report

Orlovi	66–56	Badel 1862
Scoring by quarter: 21:20, 19:4, 12:12, 14:20
Pts: Erak 24; Rebs: Rajić 13; Asts: Ristić 6		Pts: Stojanovska 18; Rebs: Mathieu 10; Asts: three players 2

Obilićevo Hall, Banja Luka
Attendance: 50
Referees: Mohorič, Pečovnik, Gajšek

15 February 2022
18:00

Report

Budućnost Bemax	70–59	Cinkarna Celje
Scoring by quarter: 14:13, 26:7, 9:18, 21:21
Pts: Đorđević 21; Rebs: Lazarević, Đorđević 12; Asts: Leković 7		Pts: Ramona 17; Rebs: four players 5 Asts: Bartelme, Čeh 2

Bemax Arena, Podgorica
Attendance: 300
Referees: Pelja, Bajgorić, Hasić

=== Game 7 ===
9 February 2022
19:30

Report

Badel 1862	59–80	Vojvodina 021
Scoring by quarter: 8:21, 15:15, 19:25, 17:19
Pts: Trajčevska 16; Rebs: Mathieu 12; Asts: Adamovska, Trajčevska 3		Pts: Loomis 29; Rebs: Loomis 14; Asts: Prokić 8

Nezavisna Makedonija, Skopje
Attendance: 120
Referees: Kuburović, Lakićević, Đikanović

23 February 2022
18:00

Report

Montana 2003	58–68	Budućnost Bemax
Scoring by quarter: 20:18, 17:15, 14:13, 7:22
Pts: Ivanova 19; Rebs: Georgieva 11; Asts: Stoycheva, Okockyte-Balkojiene 4		Pts: Đorđević 17; Rebs: Đorđević 18; Asts: Živković, Leković 5

Mladost Hall, Montana
Attendance: 200
Referees: Petković, Kovačević, Marčetić

26 February 2022
17:00

Report

Cinkarna Celje	89–61	Orlovi
Scoring by quarter: 23:20, 22:21, 22:9, 22:11
Pts: Pardee 18; Rebs: Pardee 8 Asts: Čeh 10		Pts: Rajić 21; Rebs: Erak 8 Asts: Ristić 6

Hall Gimnazija Center Celje, Celje
Attendance: 120
Referees: Glavurdić, Čićin Šain, Ljolje

15 March 2022
18:00

Report

Plamen Požega	82–67	Triglav Kranj
Scoring by quarter: 23:25, 20:9, 17:9, 22:24
Pts: Ivezić, Kapinga Maweja 25; Rebs: Kapinga Maweja 19; Asts: Ivezić, Bašić 7		Pts: Abramovič 15; Rebs: Abramovič, Burgar 6 Asts: Kozina Bubnič, Burgar 5

Tomislav Pirc, Požega
Attendance: 50
Referees: Adamović, Vavan, Dojčinović

=== Game 8 ===
25 February 2022
19:15

Report

Triglav Kranj	77–50	Badel 1862
Scoring by quarter: 23:19, 18:18, 15:7, 21:6
Pts: Kozina Bubnič, Kramžar 19; Rebs: Burgar, Vrečer 8 Asts: Abramovič, Vrečer 8		Pts: Stojanovska 18; Rebs: Mathieu 9 Asts: Trajčevska 6

Sports Hall Planina, Kranj
Attendance: 20
Referees: Terlević, Žagar, Baki

23 February 2022
16:30

Report

Vojvodina 021	62–63 (OT)	Cinkarna Celje
Scoring by quarter: 19:21, 14:13, 7:12, 18:11, Overtime: 4:6
Pts: Prokić 21; Rebs: Loomis 12; Asts: three players 3		Pts: Ramona 17; Rebs: Seničar 16; Asts: Bartelme, Pardee 3

Petrovaradin Hall, Novi Sad
Attendance: 100
Referees: Hartman, Grubišić, Barišić

2 March 2022
17:00

Report

Orlovi	86–79	Montana 2003
Scoring by quarter: 23:18, 25:31, 23:13, 15:17
Pts: Erak 27; Rebs: Ristić 9 Asts: Ristić 12		Pts: King 24; Rebs: Georgieva 12; Asts: Okockyte-Balkojiene 6

Obilićevo Hall, Banja Luka
Attendance: 50
Referees: Bogojević, Jovičin, Kral

31 January 2022
15:00

Report

Budućnost Bemax	90–55	Plamen Požega
Scoring by quarter: 26 - 18, 24 - 10, 22 - 17, 18 - 10
Pts: Drobnjak 17; Rebs: Đorđević 6 Asts: Živković 14		Pts: Podrug 15; Rebs: Podrug 12; Asts: Podrug 5

Bemax Arena, Podgorica
Attendance: 50
Referees: Radanović, Komar, Kovačević
