= 2023–24 WABA League Group B =

Group B of the WABA League is due to take place between 4 October 2023 and 20 December 2023. The four best ranked teams will advance to the SuperLeague.

On 30 November 2023 Nikšić informed the Board of the WABA League that due to financial and other problems (seriously threatened health of the coach and frequent illnesses of the players), it is not able to play the remaining four games of the 2023-24 WABA League Group Stage.

== Standings ==
Pos	Team	Pld	W	L	PF	PA	PD	Pts	Qualification or relegation
1	(Montenegro) Budućnost Bemax	8	8	0	693	445	+248	16	Advance to SuperLeague
2	(Bulgaria) Montana 2003	8	5	3	674	528	+146	13	Advance to SuperLeague
3	(Serbia) Sloga Požega	8	4	4	573	508	+65	12	Advance to SuperLeague
4	(Serbia) Duga Šabac	8	3	5	491	577	−86	11	Advance to SuperLeague
5	(Bosnia and Herzegovina) RMU Banovići	8	0	8	415	788	−373	8	
6	(Montenegro) Nikšić	0	0	0	0	0	0	0	

Updated to match(es) played on December 20, 2023. Source: WABA League

== Fixtures and results ==
All times given below are in Central European Time (for the match played in Bulgaria is time expressed in Eastern European Time).

=== Game 1 ===
4 October 2023
18:30

Report

RMU Banovići	54–61	Duga Šabac
Scoring by quarter: 8:20, 18:8, 16:18, 12:15
Pts: Šipka 24; Rebs: Šipka 16; Asts: Šipka 2		Pts: Ždrnja 18; Rebs: McElhaney 10; Asts: Ždrnja 3

SKC Banovići, Banovići
Attendance: 100
Referees: Hartman, Andrić, Žulj

4 October 2023
18:00

Report

Montana 2003	59–82	Budućnost Bemax
Scoring by quarter: 14:18, 22:17, 12:25, 11:22
Pts: Robinson 22; Rebs: Briggs 10; Asts: Robinson, Goranova 2		Pts: Domuzin 26; Rebs: Ma. Bigović 12; Asts: Mi. Bigovic, Radonjić 3

Mladost Hall, Montana
Attendance: 400
Referees: Dimovski, Ilič, Ljubić

4 October 2023
17:30

Report

Sloga Požega	98–47	Nikšić
Scoring by quarter: 12:13, 29:7, 28:12, 29:15
Pts: three players 15; Rebs: Vasiljević 8 Asts: Milijanović 5		Pts: Vujošević 10; Rebs: Tatar 6 Asts: six players 1

Sports Hall Požega, Požega
Attendance: 500
Referees: Pelja, Hasić, Bambur

=== Game 2 ===
11 October 2023
20:30

Report

Duga Šabac	78–73	Nikšić
Scoring by quarter: 22:20, 16:15, 20:26, 20:12
Pts: McElhaney 20; Rebs: McElhaney 12; Asts: Korobkova 6		Pts: Begović 23; Rebs: Hansen 13; Asts: Tatar 6

Šabac Gymnasium Hall, Šabac
Attendance: 100
Referees: Nožinović, Avdagić, Jusufović

12 October 2023
18:00

Report

Budućnost Bemax	72–45	Sloga Požega
Scoring by quarter: 18:8, 13:11, 25:21, 16:5
Pts: Drobnjak 13; Rebs: Scott, Vukčević 6 Asts: Radonjić 8		Pts: Seymour 16; Rebs: Seymour 9 Asts: Vasiljević, Karalić 3

Bemax Arena, Podgorica
Attendance: 200
Referees: Marić, Komar, Kovačević

11 October 2023
18:00

Report

RMU Banovići	51–123	Montana 2003
Scoring by quarter: 11:41, 16:26, 7:33, 17:23
Pts: Šehović 16; Rebs: Nurkić 7 Asts: five players 1		Pts: Richards 30; Rebs: Robinson 8 Asts: Vasileva 6

SKC Banovići, Banovići
Attendance: /
Referees: Kovačević, Karanović, Luković

=== Game 3 ===
18 October 2023
16:00

Report

Duga Šabac	54–73	Montana 2003
Scoring by quarter: 13:24, 18:16, 11:19, 12:14
Pts: Stepanović 11; Rebs: Stepanović 9 Asts: Jozić 9		Pts: Robinson 21; Rebs: Briggs 10; Asts: Robinson 8

Sports centre Protić, Majur
Attendance: 50
Referees: Pelja, Hašić, Bambur

18 October 2023
17:30

Report

Sloga Požega	98–41	RMU Banovići
Scoring by quarter: 29:14, 20:11, 29:13, 20:3
Pts: Filipović 20; Rebs: Arsović 8 Asts: Filipović 7		Pts: Mae-McKey 18; Rebs: Šipka 8 Asts: Mujkić, Mae-McKey 2

Sports Hall Požega, Požega
Attendance: 450
Referees: Lakićević, Lepetić, Raićević

18 October 2023
15:00

Report

Nikšić	23–112	Budućnost Bemax
Scoring by quarter: 6:23, 20:26, 13:30, 14:33
Pts: Čanović, Begović 13; Rebs: Begović, Tatar 7 Asts: three players 2		Pts: Bulajić 16; Rebs: Vukčević 13; Asts: Domužin, Savković 5

Sports center Nikšić, Nikšić
Attendance: 10
Referees: Janjušević, Popović, Radinović

=== Game 4 ===
25 October 2023
20:30

Report

Duga Šabac	64–77	Budućnost Bemax
Scoring by quarter: 12:14, 26:20, 16:16, 10:27
Pts: Ždrnja 21; Rebs: tepanović 8 Asts: tepanović 4		Pts: Domužin 16; Rebs: Ma. Bigovic 10; Asts: Radonjić, Domužin 5

Šabac Gymnasium Hall, Šabac
Attendance: 100
Referees: Skenderija, Srdić, Vavan

25 October 2023
18:30

Report

RMU Banovići	75–73	Nikšić
Scoring by quarter: 17:17, 23:14, 15:11, 20:31
Pts: Ikanović, Mae-McKey 19; Rebs: Šipka 6 Asts: Ikanović, Mae-McKey 3		Pts: Begović 21; Rebs: Tatar 7 Asts: Hansen 3

SKC Banovići, Banovići
Attendance: 100
Referees: Bogojević, Kostić, Rakić

25 October 2023
18:00

Report

Montana 2003	71–64	Sloga Požega
Scoring by quarter: 27:13, 17:9, 10:21, 17:21
Pts: Richards 22; Rebs: Briggs 16; Asts: Robinson 16		Pts: Marčetić 25; Rebs: Karalić 11; Asts: Vasiljević 7

Mladost Hall, Montana
Attendance: 200
Referees: Grubišić, Holjevac, Lipovac

=== Game 5 ===
2 November 2023
17:30

Report

Sloga Požega	73–56	Duga Šabac
Scoring by quarter: 27:10, 11:11, 16:14, 19:21
Pts: Francis 18; Rebs: three players 7 Asts: Marčetić 5		Pts: Stepanovic 18; Rebs: Stepanovic 10; Asts: Gluvić 4

Sports Hall Požega, Požega
Attendance: 400
Referees: Kovačević, Manojlović, Lazarević

1 November 2023
15:00

Report

Nikšić	53–117	Montana 2003
Scoring by quarter: 18:34, 13:31, 14:26, 8:26
Pts: A. Begović 17; Rebs: Tatar 5 Asts: A. Begović, Tatar 2		Pts: Richards 29; Rebs: three players 6 Asts: Robinson 8

Sports center Nikšić, Nikšić
Attendance: 1
Referees: Šutalo, Jurković, Anić

31 October 2023
18:00

Report

Budućnost Bemax	110–44	RMU Banovići
Scoring by quarter: 23:13, 22:16, 32:10, 33:5
Pts: three players 12; Rebs: K. Šćepanović 8 Asts: Radonjić 8		Pts: Ikanović 12; Rebs: Ikanović 7 Asts: Šipka, Mae-McKey 2

Bemax Arena, Podgorica
Attendance: 300
Referees: Bajramović, Stojanović, Malekinušić

=== Game 6 ===
20 November 2023
19:30

Report

Duga Šabac	83–66	RMU Banovići
Scoring by quarter: 18:20, 16:19, 24:14, 25:13
Pts: McElhaney 20; Rebs: Ždrnja, Prodanović 10; Asts: Ždrnja 7		Pts: Šipka 33; Rebs: Šipka 18; Asts: Ikanović 3

Šabac Gymnasium Hall, Šabac
Attendance: 100
Referees: Holjevac, Lipovac, Šola

3 November 2023
18:00

Report

Budućnost Bemax	88–79	Montana 2003
Scoring by quarter: 12:20, 21:14, 35:24, 20:21
Pts: Radonjić 24; Rebs: Domuzin 11; Asts: Radonjić 5		Pts: Briggs 29; Rebs: Richards 14; Asts: Robinson 6

Bemax Arena, Podgorica
Attendance: 500
Referees: Dimovski, Jolović, Ilić

22 November 2023
15:00

Report

Nikšić	54–113	Sloga Požega
Scoring by quarter: 19:37, 12:34, 13:20, 10:22
Pts: Begović, Gavrić 23; Rebs: Begović, Milić 4 Asts: Milić 3		Pts: Seymour 20; Rebs: Gorudžić 11; Asts: Vasiljević, Karalić 5

Sports center Nikšić, Nikšić
Attendance: 1
Referees: Jurković, Kovačević, Tolić

=== Game 7 ===
11 December 2023
12:00

Report

Nikšić	vs.	Duga Šabac

Sports center Nikšić, Nikšić

29 November 2023
17:30

Report

Sloga Požega	61–67	Budućnost Bemax
Scoring by quarter: 18:20, 18:25, 19:11, 6:11
Pts: Marčetić, Filipović 15; Rebs: Karalić 17; Asts: Arsović, Karalić 5		Pts: Domužin 19; Rebs: Šćepanović 8 Asts: Radonjić 6

Sports Hall Požega, Požega
Attendance: 450
Referees: Pelja, Hašić, Bambur

29 November 2023
18:00

Report

Montana 2003	110–48	RMU Banovići
Scoring by quarter: 23:8, 31:10, 29:9, 27:21
Pts: Robinson 20; Rebs: Briggs 10; Asts: Vasileva 13		Pts: Šipka 15; Rebs: Šipka 14; Asts: Ikanović 4

Mladost Hall, Montana
Attendance: 200
Referees: Kovačević, Lukovic, Karanović

=== Game 8 ===
6 December 2023
17:30

Report

Montana 2003	92–57	Duga Šabac
Scoring by quarter: 15:7, 19:17, 30:13, 28:20
Pts: Richards 18; Rebs: Richards 10; Asts: Vasileva 6		Pts: McElhaney 20; Rebs: Stepanović, Prodanović 7 Asts: Gluvić 3

Mladost Hall, Montana
Attendance: 100
Referees: Mijalkovski, Vlatko Cvetanoski, Jordan Chervenka

6 December 2023
18:00

Report

RMU Banovići	64–99	Sloga Požega
Scoring by quarter: 8:27, 16:21, 14:30, 26:21
Pts: Ikanović 18; Rebs: Nurkić 9 Asts: Ikanović 3		Pts: Filipović 21; Rebs: Marčetić 6 Asts: Francis, Karalić 3

SKC Banovići, Banovići
Attendance: n/a
Referees: n/a

6 December 2023
16:30

Report

Budućnost Bemax	vs.	Nikšić

Bemax Arena, Podgorica

=== Game 9 ===
14 December 2023
18:00

Report

Budućnost Bemax	93–46	Duga Šabac
Scoring by quarter: 25:22, 19:2, 29:11, 20:11
Pts: K. Šćepanović 15; Rebs: Vukčević 7 Asts: Savković 5		Pts: McElhaney, Stepanović 14; Rebs: Stepanović 8 Asts: Stepanović 3

Bemax Arena, Podgorica
Attendance: 200
Referees: Hašić, Jurković, Bambur

13 December 2023

Report

Nikšić	vs.	RMU Banovići

Sports center Nikšić, Nikšić

13 December 2023
17:30

Report

Sloga Požega	84–67	Montana 2003
Scoring by quarter: 27:12, 18:22, 27:16, 12:17
Pts: Karalić 26; Rebs: Karalić 10; Asts: Filipović 5		Pts: Koleva 16; Rebs: Koleva 11; Asts: Vasileva 6

Sports Hall Požega, Požega
Attendance: 250
Referees: Popović, Lepetić, Knežević

=== Game 10 ===
20 December 2023
20:30

Report

Duga Šabac	70–49	Sloga Požega
Scoring by quarter: 21:19, 13:13, 13:8, 23:11
Pts: McElhaney 19; Rebs: Stepanović 10; Asts: Jozić 5		Pts: Francis 14; Rebs: Radović 8 Asts: Marčetić 3

Šabac Gymnasium Hall, Šabac
Attendance: 100
Referees: Dimovski, Ilić, Lazarević

20 December 2023

Report

Montana 2003	vs.	Nikšić

Mladost Hall, Montana

20 December 2023
17:30

Report

RMU Banovići	47–104	Budućnost Bemax
Scoring by quarter: 13:27, 12:20, 9:37, 13:20
Pts: Ikanović 18; Rebs: Šipka 15; Asts: Ikanović 5		Pts: Radonjić 19; Rebs: Radonjić 7 Asts: Radević 4

SKC Banovići, Banovići
Attendance: /
Referees: Katić, K. Holjevac, B. Holjevac
