= 2021–22 WABA League Final Four =

Final Four was held on 19–20 March 2022. in Podgorica, Montenegro.

== Semifinals ==
19 March 2022
16:00

Report

Cinkarna Celje	74–58	Orlovi
Scoring by quarter: 24:15, 13:20, 26:14, 11:9
Pts: Ramona 20; Rebs: Jelenc 10; Asts: Jelenc, Ramona 3		Pts: Rajić 16; Rebs: Erak 9 Asts: Ristić 9

Bemax Arena, Podgorica
Attendance: 100
Referees: Hadžić, Terlević, Stanković

19 March 2022
19:00

Report

Budućnost Bemax	102–45	Montana 2003
Scoring by quarter: 21:13, 27:12, 19:9, 35:11
Pts: Živković, Leković 19; Rebs: Đorđević 9 Asts: Leković 6		Pts: Ivanova 12; Rebs: Petrova 7 Asts: Stoycheva 3

Bemax Arena, Podgorica
Attendance: 2500
Referees: Petković, Kral, Kovačević

== Third place ==
20 March 2022
16:00

Report

Montana 2003	63–72	Orlovi
Scoring by quarter: 18:16, 15:16, 10:19, 20:21
Pts: Ivanova 31; Rebs: Georgieva 12; Asts: Okockyte-Balkojiene 8		Pts: Rajić 22; Rebs: Erak 11; Asts: Ristić 9

Bemax Arena, Podgorica
Attendance: 50
Referees: Petković, Kral, Kovačević

== Final ==
20 March 2022
19:00

Report

Budućnost Bemax	51–58	Cinkarna Celje
Scoring by quarter: 11:19, 9:13, 17:16, 14:10
Pts: Živković, Đorđević 11; Rebs: Đorđević 12; Asts: Živković 5		Pts: Ramona 16; Rebs: Gbemuotor 12; Asts: Bartelme 5

Bemax Arena, Podgorica
Attendance: 2600
Referees: Hadžić, Terlević, Stanković

== Bracket ==
Semifinals
1 (Montenegro) Budućnost Bemax	102
4 (Bulgaria) Montana 2003	45
2 (Slovenia) Cinkarna Celje	74
3 (Bosnia and Herzegovina) Orlovi	58

Final
(Montenegro) Budućnost Bemax	51
(Slovenia) Cinkarna Celje	58
Third place
(Bulgaria) Montana 2003	63
(Bosnia and Herzegovina) Orlovi	72

2021–22 WABA League champion

Cinkarna Celje
3rd title
