= 2023–24 WABA League SuperLeague =

SuperLeague of the WABA League took place between 9 January 2024 and it will end on 6 March 2024. The four best ranked teams advanced to the Final Four. The points against teams from the same preliminary round were taken over.

== Standings ==
Pos	Team	Pld	W	L	PF	PA	PD	Pts	Qualification or relegation
1	(Montenegro) Budućnost Bemax	12	11	1	942	740	+202	23	Advance to the Final Four
2	(Slovenia) Cinkarna Celje	12	11	1	1054	749	+305	23	Advance to the Final Four
3	(Bosnia and Herzegovina) Orlovi	12	6	6	830	898	−68	18	Advance to the Final Four
4	(Serbia) Sloga Požega	12	5	7	787	858	−71	17	Advance to the Final Four
5	(Serbia) Partizan 1953	12	4	8	882	955	−73	16	
6	(Bulgaria) Montana 2003	12	4	8	840	907	−67	16	
7	(Serbia) Duga Šabac	12	1	11	755	983	−228	13	

Updated to match(es) played on March 6, 2024. Source: WABA League

== Fixtures and results ==
All times given below are in Central European Time (for the match played in Bulgaria is time expressed in Eastern European Time).

=== Game 1 ===
9 January 2024
18:00

Report

Cinkarna Celje	94–66	Duga Šabac
Scoring by quarter: 23:18, 29:8, 23:25, 19:15
Pts: Silva 26; Rebs: Bartelme 13; Asts: Bartelme 10		Pts: McElhaney 19; Rebs: McElhaney 10; Asts: Jozić, Ždrnja 4

Hall Gimnazija Center Celje, Celje
Attendance: 70
Referees: Terlević, Koraca, Žagar

10 January 2024
17:30

Report

Orlovi	75–80	Sloga Požega
Scoring by quarter: 16:15, 18:25, 22:19, 19:21
Pts: Šobot 25; Rebs: Predojević 12; Asts: Mužević 6		Pts: Filipović 18; Rebs: Marčetić, Radović 9 Asts: Radović 6

Obilićevo Hall, Banja Luka
Attendance: 60
Referees: Peić, Pavičić, Muhvić

10 January 2024
18:00

Report

Partizan 1953	87–62	Montana 2003
Scoring by quarter: 27:8, 21:20, 24:16, 15:18
Pts: Boričić 25; Rebs: Boričić, Marojević 8 Asts: Stojić 5		Pts: Dencheva 23; Rebs: Fairley 11; Asts: Vasileva 6

Ranko Žeravica Sports Hall, Belgrade
Attendance: 50
Referees: Karović, Hašić, Brestovac

=== Game 2 ===
16 January 2024
17:30

Report

Sloga Požega	71–63	Partizan 1953
Scoring by quarter: 21:13, 15:22, 20:13, 15:15
Pts: Filipović 18; Rebs: Marcetić 12; Asts: Filipović 7		Pts: Jovanović 13; Rebs: Boričić 9 Asts: Stojić 5

Sports Hall Požega, Požega
Attendance: 250
Referees: Ilić, Krstić, Jolović

16 January 2024
18:00

Report

Duga Šabac	64–69	Orlovi
Scoring by quarter: 18:17, 21:14, 17:19, 8:19
Pts: McElhaney 17; Rebs: McElhaney 9 Asts: Jozić 7		Pts: Mužević 25; Rebs: Mitrović, Predojević 9 Asts: Mitrović 6

Šabac Gymnasium Hall, Šabac
Attendance: 100
Referees: Hartman, Grubišić, Holjevac

18 January 2024
18:00

Report

Budućnost Bemax	67–53	Cinkarna Celje
Scoring by quarter: 19:10, 17:8, 11:14, 20:21
Pts: Drobnjak 29; Rebs: Bigović 13; Asts: Radonjić, Domužin 4		Pts: Uranker 19; Rebs: Čeh 7 Asts: Čeh 6

Bemax Arena, Podgorica
Attendance: 100
Referees: Dimovski, Ilić, Gudžulić

=== Game 3 ===
30 January 2024
16:30

Report

Partizan 1953	89–75	Duga Šabac
Scoring by quarter: 24:17, 21:19, 28:23, 16:16
Pts: Boričić 16; Rebs: Dinčić 10; Asts: Stojić 10		Pts: McElhaney 24; Rebs: McElhaney 13; Asts: Ždrnja 7

Ranko Žeravica Sports Hall, Belgrade
Attendance: 20
Referees: Bogojević, Kovačević, Savić

24 January 2024
19:00

Report

Cinkarna Celje	101–74	Montana 2003
Scoring by quarter: 19:18, 31:16, 31:12, 20:28
Pts: Silva 25; Rebs: Gbemuotor 10; Asts: Bartelme 7		Pts: Todorova 18; Rebs: Todorova 7 Asts: Todorova 6

Hall Gimnazija Center Celje, Celje
Attendance: 100
Referees: Pelja, Hasić, Bambur

24 January 2024
19:00

Report

Orlovi	60–76	Budućnost Bemax
Scoring by quarter: 11:14, 13:18, 23:23, 13:21
Pts: Šobot 15; Rebs: Predojević 11; Asts: Mitrović 5		Pts: Savković 18; Rebs: Domužin 8 Asts: Domužin 5

Obilićevo Hall, Banja Luka
Attendance: 100
Referees: Mustapić, Peić, Muhvić

=== Game 4 ===
2 February 2024
18:00

Report

Budućnost Bemax	80–62	Partizan 1953
Scoring by quarter: 16:6, 19:25, 28:15, 17:16
Pts: Radonjić 22; Rebs: Bigović 15; Asts: Savković 5		Pts: Boričić 17; Rebs: Boričić 13; Asts: Boričić 5

Bemax Arena, Podgorica
Attendance: 250
Referees: Komar, Kovačević, Mišeljić

31 January 2024
18:00

Report

Montana 2003	45–56	Orlovi
Scoring by quarter: 13:19, 9:11, 13:0, 10:26
Pts: Damyanova 15; Rebs: Fairley 14; Asts: Vasileva 6		Pts: Šobot 19; Rebs: Safiyah B. 12; Asts: Mitrović 3

Mladost Hall, Montana
Attendance: 150
Referees: Dimovski, Jolović, Ilić

7 February 2024
17:30

Report

Sloga Požega	66–74	Cinkarna Celje
Scoring by quarter: 19:17, 8:24, 22:12, 17:21
Pts: Filipović 23; Rebs: Filipović 13; Asts: Filipović 4		Pts: Silva 20; Rebs: Silva 14; Asts: three players 4

Sports Hall Požega, Požega
Attendance: 400
Referees: Lakićević, Kostić, Dragojević

=== Game 5 ===
2 March 2024
17:00

Report

Duga Šabac	44–100	Cinkarna Celje
Scoring by quarter: 15:20, 8:27, 14:29, 7:24
Pts: McElhaney 18; Rebs: McElhaney 8 Asts: Korobkova, Stepanović 3		Pts: Bartelme, Becker 17; Rebs: Jelenc, Silva 7 Asts: Bartelme 8

Šabac Gymnasium Hall, Šabac
Attendance: 100
Referees: Adamović, Simić, Kralj

14 February 2024
17:30

Report

Sloga Požega	81–64	Orlovi
Scoring by quarter: 24:20, 15:10, 24:14, 18:20
Pts: Marčetić 17; Rebs: Filipović 12; Asts: Marčetić 8		Pts: Mužević 15; Rebs: Marjanović 9 Asts: Mitrović 5

Sports Hall Požega, Požega
Attendance: 350
Referees: Lakićević, Raičević, Kostić

14 February 2024
18:00

Report

Montana 2003	85–74	Partizan 1953
Scoring by quarter: 25:13, 17:25, 26:17, 17:19
Pts: Todorova 29; Rebs: Battle 13; Asts: Todorova 7		Pts: Stojić 20; Rebs: Stojić, Marojević 5 Asts: Stojić 3

Mladost Hall, Montana
Attendance: 100
Referees: Karović, Hasić, Džampo

=== Game 6 ===
21 February 2024
18:00

Report

Partizan 1953	83–66	Sloga Požega
Scoring by quarter: 22:16, 18:16, 26:13, 17:21
Pts: Jovanović 25; Rebs: Boričić 7 Asts: Stojić 11		Pts: Radović 16; Rebs: Radović 8 Asts: Marčetić, Filipović 4

Ranko Žeravica Sports Hall, Belgrade
Attendance: 100
Referees: Miloradović, Kovačević, Karanović

21 February 2024
19:00

Report

Orlovi	71–60	Duga Šabac
Scoring by quarter: 15:13, 21:20, 20:12, 15:15
Pts: Šobot 15; Rebs: Predojević 14; Asts: Mitrović 6		Pts: Stepanović 13; Rebs: McElhaney 12; Asts: Ždrnja 4

Obilićevo Hall, Banja Luka
Attendance: 150
Referees: Katić, Hartman, Barišić

21 February 2024
19:00

Report

Cinkarna Celje	69–63	Budućnost Bemax
Scoring by quarter: 17:13, 16:8, 19:22, 17:20
Pts: Becker 21; Rebs: Gbemuotor 12; Asts: Bartelme 10		Pts: Domužin 17; Rebs: Ma. Bigović 13; Asts: Domužin 5

Hall Gimnazija Center Celje, Celje
Attendance: 250
Referees: Peić, Pavičić, Muhvić

=== Game 7 ===
27 February 2024
20:30

Report

Duga Šabac	99–101	Partizan 1953
Scoring by quarter: 26:32, 28:20, 23:25, 22:24
Pts: McElhaney 28; Rebs: McElhaney 11; Asts: Stepanović 12		Pts: Boričić 26; Rebs: Dinčić 11; Asts: Davinić 9

Šabac Gymnasium Hall, Šabac
Attendance: 100
Referees: Marčetić, Kovačević, Luković

28 February 2024
18:00

Report

Montana 2003	54–80	Cinkarna Celje
Scoring by quarter: 18:12, 14:22, 15:24, 7:22
Pts: Robinson 20; Rebs: Todorova, Damyanova 6 Asts: Robinson 5		Pts: Silva 21; Rebs: Silva 11; Asts: Bartelme 7

Mladost Hall, Montana
Attendance: 150
Referees: Pelja, Hašić, Džampo

28 February 2024
18:00

Report

Budućnost Bemax	102–68	Orlovi
Scoring by quarter: 24:14, 23:16, 33:20, 22:18
Pts: Radonjić 22; Rebs: Šćepanović 8 Asts: Radonjić, Bulajić 3		Pts: Mužević 21; Rebs: Mužević 9 Asts: Mitrović 2

Bemax Arena, Podgorica
Attendance: 70
Referees: Jolović, Ilić, Karanović

=== Game 8 ===
6 March 2024
18:00

Report

Partizan 1953	74–75	Budućnost Bemax
Scoring by quarter: 22:17, 19:14, 19:22, 14:22
Pts: Boričić, Marojević 16; Rebs: Boričić 11; Asts: Stojič, Davinić 5		Pts: Radonjić 24; Rebs: Drobnjak 11; Asts: Radonjić 8

Ranko Žeravica Sports Hall, Belgrade
Attendance: 50
Referees: Katić, Hartman, Holjevac

6 March 2024
19:00

Report

Orlovi	80–79 (OT)	Montana 2003
Scoring by quarter: 19:15, 16:13, 15:18, 18:22, Overtime: 12:11
Pts: Mužević 38; Rebs: Mužević 12; Asts: Mitrović, Mužević 6		Pts: Robinson 27; Rebs: Todorova 9 Asts: Robinson 5

Obilićevo Hall, Banja Luka
Attendance: 100
Referees: Peić, Pavičić, Kruljac

5 March 2024
18:00

Report

Cinkarna Celje	96–45	Sloga Požega
Scoring by quarter: 25:6, 28:11, 19:19, 24:9
Pts: Silva 27; Rebs: Silva 14; Asts: Bartelme, Čeh 8		Pts: Jeremić 10; Rebs: Filipović 7 Asts: Filipović 4

Hall Gimnazija Center Celje, Celje
Attendance: 100
Referees: Skenderija, Vavan, Đukić
