= Emilija Podrug =

Croatian basketball player

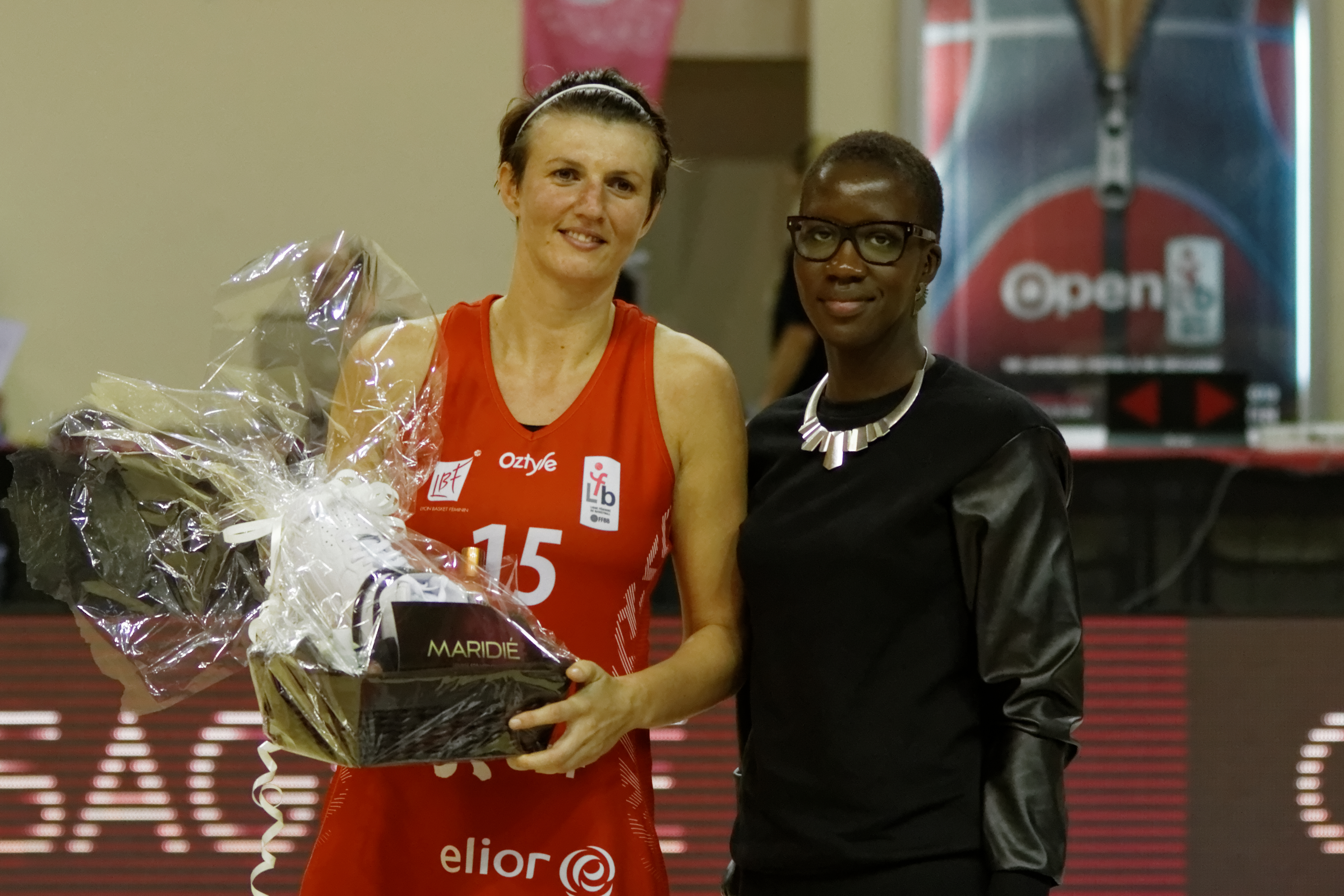
- At Open LFB, Arras-Lyon, October 6th, 2013

Personal information
- Born: December 20, 1979 (age 46) Split, SFR Yugoslavia
- Listed height: 1.90 m (6 ft 3 in)

Career information
- Playing career: 199?–present
- Position: Power forward

Career history
- 2004-2005: Faenza
- 2005-2006: USO Mondeville
- 2006-2007: Basket Parma
- 2007-2008: MiZo Pécs
- 2008-2010: Lotos Gdynia
- 2010: CB Avenida
- 2010-2011: Nantes Rezé Basket
- 2011-2012: Challes-les-Eaux Basket
- 2012-2014: Union Lyon Basket Féminin
- 2014-2015: Nantes Rezé Basket
- 2015-2016: ESB Villeneuve-d'Ascq
- 2016-2017: Toulouse Métropole Basket
- 2019-2021: Scrivia

Emilija Podrug (born December 20, 1979) is a Croatian female basketball player.
