= 2023–24 WABA League Final Four =

Final Four will be held on 23–24 March 2024 in Podgorica, Montenegro.

== Semifinals ==
23 March 2024
19:30

Report

Budućnost Bemax	78–57	Sloga Požega
Scoring by quarter: 26:12, 16:11, 18:12, 18:22
Pts: Domužin, Šćepanović 14; Rebs: Ma. Bigović 5 Asts: three players 3		Pts: Francis 15; Rebs: Arsović 4 Asts: Arsović 2

Bemax Arena, Podgorica
Attendance: 2500
Referees: Kruljac, Hartman, Brzoja

23 March 2024
16:30

Report

Cinkarna Celje	77–61	Orlovi
Scoring by quarter: 19:22, 16:22, 27:15, 15:2

Bemax Arena, Podgorica
Attendance: 30
Referees: Mustapić, Katić, Muhvić

== Third place ==
24 March 2024
16:30

Report

L1	vs.	L2

Bemax Arena, Podgorica

== Final ==
24 March 2024
19:30

Report

W1	vs.	W2

Bemax Arena, Podgorica

== Bracket ==
Semifinals
23 March 2024
(Montenegro) Budućnost Bemax	78
(Serbia) Sloga Požega	57
23 March 2024
(Slovenia) Cinkarna Celje	77
(Bosnia and Herzegovina) Orlovi	61

Final
24 March 2024
(Montenegro) Budućnost Bemax	59
(Slovenia) Cinkarna Celje	64
Third place
24 March 2024
(Serbia) Sloga Požega	.
(Bosnia and Herzegovina) Orlovi	.

2023–24 Adriatic League champion

.
? title
