= 2021–22 WABA League Classification 9–12 =

Classification 9–12 of the WABA League took place between 3 March 2022 and it will end on 16 March 2022.

25 September 2021 Feniks Pale has withdraws from the 2021–22 WABA League. As per the Official Basketball Rules, all games were awarded to their respective opponents with a score of 20-0. Furthermore, the forfeiting team Feniks will receive 0 classification points in the standings.

== Ninth place game ==
Team #1	Agg.	Team #2	1st leg	2nd leg	Extra time
(Serbia) Partizan 1953	181:184	(North Macedonia) KAM Basket	86:71	84:99	11:14

=== Game 1 ===
3 March 2022
17:00

Report

Partizan 1953	86–71	KAM Basket
Scoring by quarter: 23:16, 23:17, 22:20, 18:18
Pts: Samardžić 25; Rebs: Davinić 7 Asts: Davinić 8		Pts: Puljizović 34; Rebs: Puljizović 19; Asts: Aleksić 9

Ranko Žeravica Sports Hall, Belgrade
Attendance: 23
Referees: Pelja, Bajgorić, Hasić

=== Game 2 ===
16 March 2022
17:00

Report

KAM Basket	99–84	Partizan 1953
Scoring by quarter: 25:26, 23:21, 26:21, 25:16
Pts: Puljizović, Aleksić 36; Rebs: Puljizović 15; Asts: Aleksić 7		Pts: Olić 23; Rebs: Olić 5 Asts: Olić 10

Kiril i Metodij Hall, Makedonska Kamenica
Attendance: 100
Referees: Ćetković, Gligorović, Đikanović

== Eleventh place game ==
Team #1	Agg.	Team #2	1st leg	2nd leg
(Bosnia and Herzegovina) Feniks Pale	0:40	(Bosnia and Herzegovina) RMU Banovići	0:20	0:20

=== Game 1 ===
20 January 2022

Feniks Pale	0–20	RMU Banovići

=== Game 2 ===
23 February 2022

RMU Banovići	20–0	Feniks Pale
