= Jelena Ivezić =

Croatian basketball player

Plamen Požega
- Position: Small forward
- League: Adriatic League; First League of Croatia

Personal information
- Born: 17 March 1984 (age 42) Slavonski Brod, SFR Yugoslavia
- Listed height: 184 cm (6 ft 0 in)
- Listed weight: 73 kg (161 lb)

Career information
- WNBA draft: 2004: undrafted
- Playing career: 2000–present

Career history
- 2000–2006: Croatia Zagreb
- 2006: EBE Promociones
- 2006–2007: Partizan
- 2007–2008: MiZo Pecs
- 2008–2012: Gospić
- 2012–2013: Ceyhan Bld
- 2013: Antakya
- 2013–2014: Novi Zagreb
- 2014–2015: Eirene Ragusa
- 2015–2016: Dike Napoli
- 2016: Azzurra Orvieto
- 2016: MBK Doğuş Hastanesi
- 2017–2018: San Martino
- 2019–2020: Undominated Umea
- 2020–present: Plamen Požega
Medals
Women's Basketball
Representing Croatia
Mediterranean Games
Bronze medal – third place	Pescara 2009	Team Event

Jelena Ivezić (born 17 March 1984 in Slavonski Brod, SFR Yugoslavia) is a Croatian female basketball player. At the 2012 Summer Olympics, she competed for the Croatia women's national basketball team in the women's event. She is 6 ft 1 inches tall.
