= Isabela Ramona =

Brazilian basketball player (born 1994)

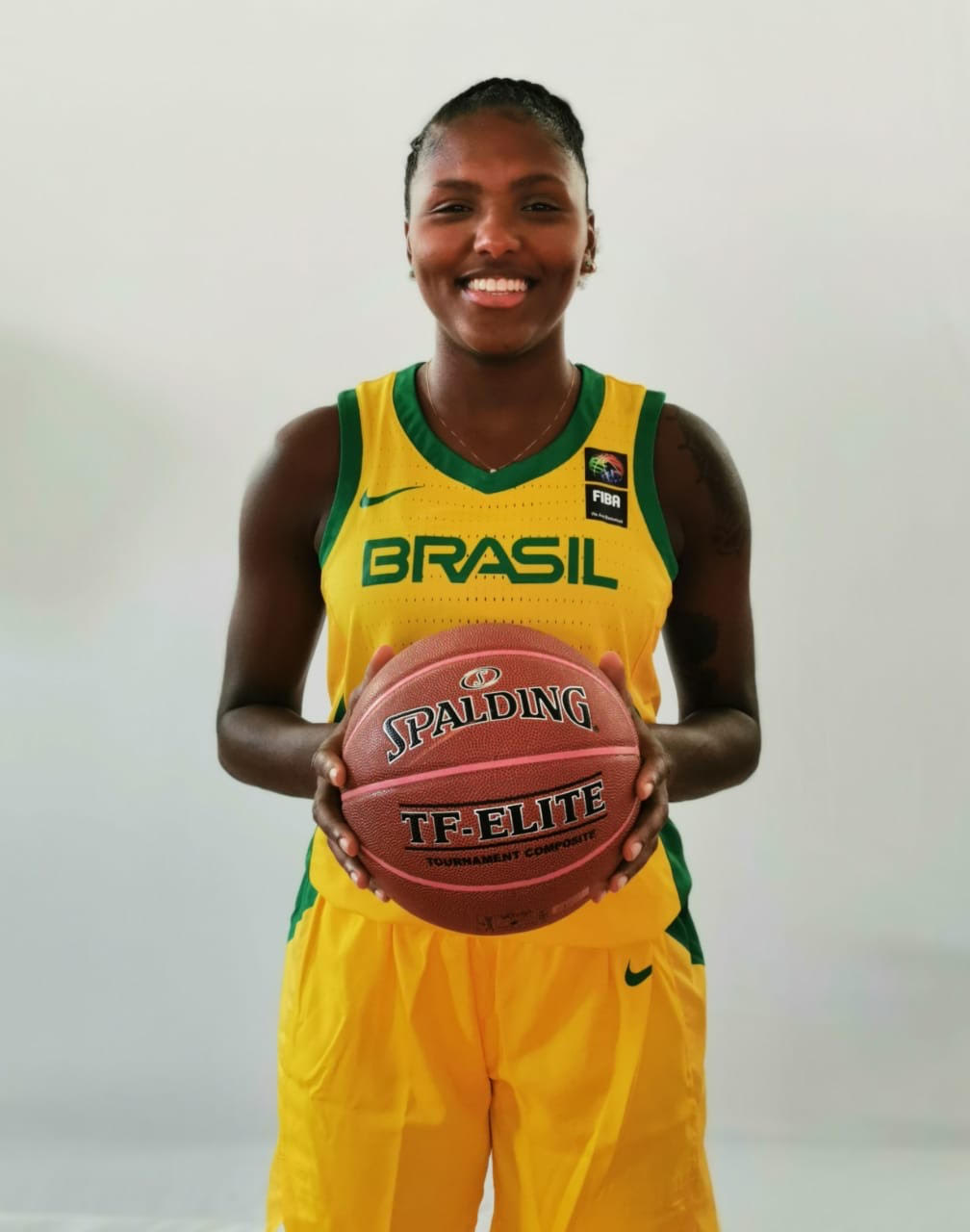

València Basket
- Position: Shooting guard
- League: LF2

Personal information
- Born: January 23, 1994 (age 32) Salvador, Bahia
- Listed height: 5 ft 10 in (1.78 m)
Medals
Women's basketball
Representing Brazil
FIBA AmeriCup
Gold medal – first place	2023 León
Pan American Games
Gold medal – first place	2019 Lima	Team

Isabela Ramona Lyra Macedo (born January 23, 1994) is a Brazilian basketball player for Valencia Basket and the Brazilian national team, where she participated at the 2014 FIBA World Championship.

She was also a member of the Brazil women's national basketball team which competed at the 2015 Pan American Games.
