= Marija Leković (basketball) =

Montenegrin basketball player (born 2003)

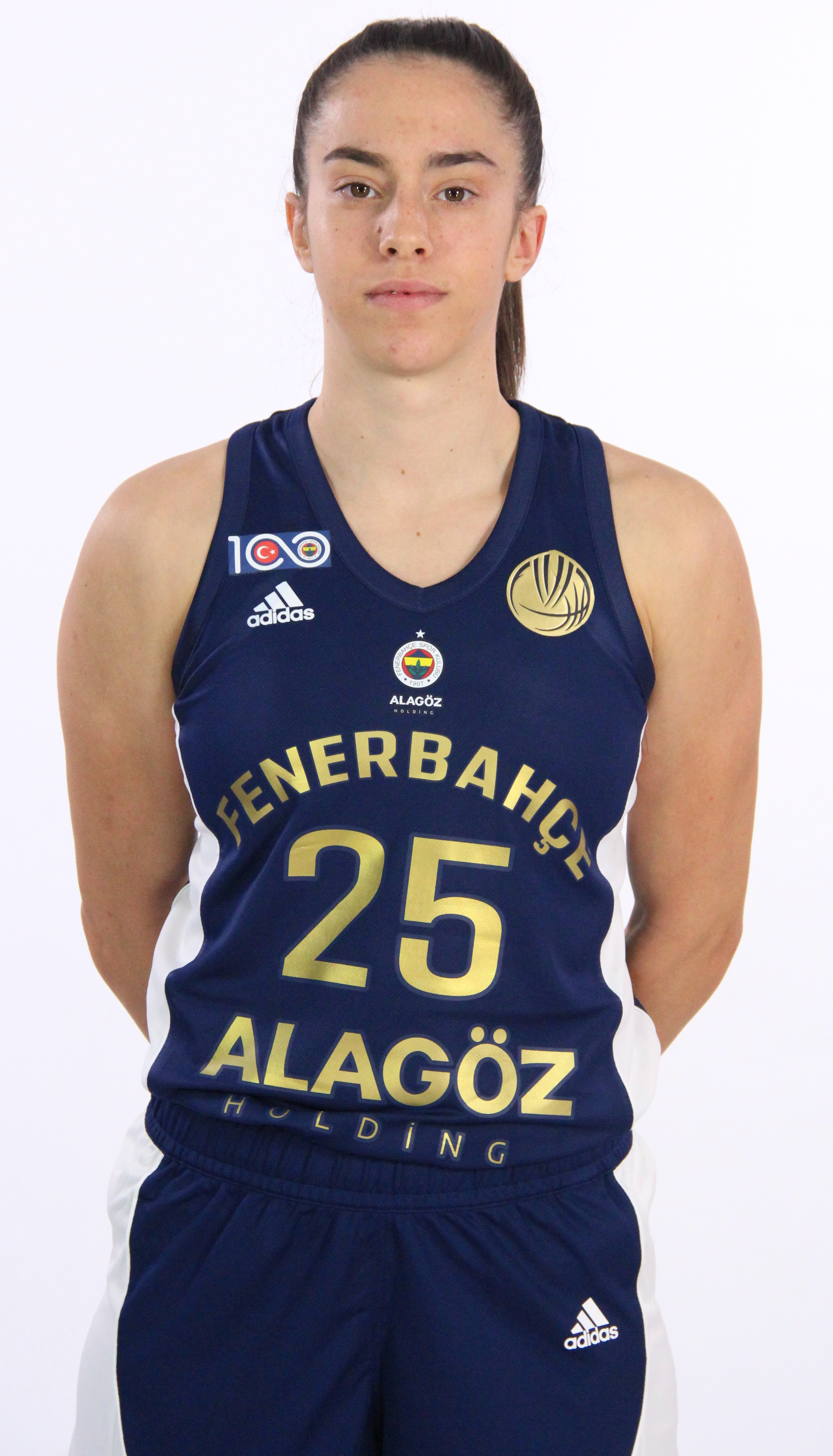
- Marija Leković in 2023 with #25

No. 25 – Valencia Basket
- Positions: Guard, Shooting guard
- League: Liga Femenina; EuroLeague

Personal information
- Born: July 21, 2003 (age 23) Bar, Serbia and Montenegro
- Listed height: 5 ft 7 in (1.70 m)

Career history
- 2018–2023: Budućnost Bemax
- 2023–2025: Fenerbahçe
- 2025–present: Valencia Basket

Career highlights
- EuroLeague champion (2024); 2x FIBA Europe SuperCup Women champion (2023, 2024); Adriatic League champion (2020); 4x Montenegro League champion (2019, 2021, 2022, 2023); 5x Montenegro Cup winner (2019, 2020, 2021, 2022, 2023); Turkish Super League champion (2024); Turkish Cup winner (2024); Turkish Super Cup winner (2024); Triple Crown (2024)
Medals
Women's basketball
Representing Montenegro
Games of the Small States of Europe
Gold medal – first place	2025 Andorra	Team

Marija Leković (Montenegrin Cyrillic: Марија Лековић) is a Montenegrin professional basketball player who plays for Valencia Basket of the Liga Femenina de Baloncesto and the EuroLeague. She has represented the Montenegrin national team since 2019. Standing at 1.70 m (5 ft 7 in) she plays guard.

== Club ==
She started her career with Budućnost Bemax and played 4 seasons with them, excluding the cancelled 2019–2020 season. She won 4 league and 5 cup titles with the team. After being a starter five, she averaged 11.6 points, 3.8 rebounds, 4.9 assists per game in the 2020–21 season; 10.9 points, 4.9 assists per game in the 2021–22 season and averaged 11.5 points, 2.6 rebounds, 5.4 assists in the 2022–23 season.

On 26 July 2023, she signed a three-year deal with Fenerbahçe. On February 12, 2025, Fenerbahçe announced that it had parted ways with the player.

== International ==
She played for the U16 Montenegrin National Team and averaged 10.8 points, 5.6 rebounds and 4.9 assists in the U16 B European Championship 2018 and she averaged 13 points, 4.9 rebounds and 5.9 assists per game in the U16 B European Championship 2019.

She played for the Montenegrin national team in the EuroBasket Women 2023 and averaged 10.5 points and 3.3 rebounds in 21 minutes per game. She scored 15 pts against Spain, 15 pts against Italy and 18 pts against Serbia.

== Honours ==
=== Club ===
- EuroLeague Women
  - Championship (1) 2024
- FIBA Europe SuperCup Women
  - Championship (2) 2023, 2024
- Adriatic League
  - Championship (1) 2020
  - Runners-up (4) 2019, 2021, 2022, 2023
- First A Women's Basketball League of Montenegro
  - Championship (4) 2019, 2021, 2022, 2023
- Montenegro Cup
  - Championship (5) 2019, 2020, 2021, 2022, 2023
- Women's Basketball Super League of Turkey
  - Championship (1) 2024
- Turkish Cup
  - Championship (1) 2024
- Turkish Super Cup
  - Championship (1) 2024
- Triple Crown (1) : 2024

=== Individual ===
- First A Women's Basketball League of Montenegro MVP (1): 2021, 2023
