= ŽKK Plamen Požega =

Croatian women's basketball club

Plamen Požega
- Leagues: Premier Women's League
- Founded: 1959
- Arena: SD Tomislav Pirc
- Capacity: 1,200
- Location: Požega, Croatia
- Website: www.zkkplamenpozega.hr

KK Plamen Požega, commonly referred to as Plamen Požega, is a Croatian women's basketball club based in the city of Požega in the western Slavonia region. Established in 1959, the club hosts its games at the Tomislav Pirc Sports Hall, which has a capacity of 1,200.

As of 2024, the club plays in the Women's Premier League, the top level of women's basketball in Croatia.

== Honours ==
- Croatian Premier League
  - Runners-up (1): 2021–22
- Croatian Cup
  - Winners (1): 2024
