= EuroBasket Women 2019 qualification =

This page describes the qualification procedure for EuroBasket Women 2019.

== Qualifying draw ==
The draw for the qualification took place on 4 July 2017 in Munich, Germany.

Pot 1	Pot 2	Pot 3	Pot 4
**Spain**; **France**; **Belgium**; Greece; **Turkey**; **Italy**; Slovakia; **Russia**	**Ukraine**; **Hungary**; **Czech Republic**; **Slovenia**; **Belarus**; **Montenegro**; Israel; **Sweden**	Croatia; Romania; **Great Britain**; Poland; Netherlands; Iceland; Lithuania; Germany	Finland; Bulgaria; Bosnia and Herzegovina; Portugal; Estonia; Switzerland; Albania; Macedonia

- Teams marked in **bold** have qualified for EuroBasket Women 2019.

== Groups ==
The top team from each one of the eight groups, as well as the six best-finishing second-placed teams, will be qualified.

=== Group A ===
Pos	Team	Pld	W	L	PF	PA	PD	Pts	Qualification
1	Montenegro	6	4	2	451	378	+73	**10 (Note: Montenegro 2–2, +19 PD; Bosnia and Herzegovina 2–2, +1 PD; Slovakia 2–2, –20 PD)**	Final tournament
2	Bosnia and Herzegovina	6	4	2	493	452	+41	**10**	
3	Slovakia	6	4	2	468	442	+26	**10**	
4	Iceland	6	0	6	354	494	−140	**6**	

Source: FIBA
Rules for classification: 1) Points; 2) Head-to-head; 3) Points difference; 4) Points scored.
Notes:

11 November 2017	Iceland	62–**84**	**Montenegro**	Reykjavík
16:00 (UTC+0)	Scoring by quarter: 15–**24**, **17**–15, 8–**22**, 22–**23**
	Pts: Kjartansdóttir 23; Rebs: H. Sverrisdóttir 10; Asts: H. Sverrisdóttir 9	Boxscore	Pts: Dubljević 30; Rebs: Dubljević 6 Asts: Pašić 5	Arena: Laugardalshöll; Referees: Henri Hilke (FIN), Jonas Bille (DEN), Sergey Mikhaylov (RUS)

11 November 2017	**Bosnia and Herzegovina**	**79**–67	Slovakia	Sarajevo
18:00 (UTC+1)	Scoring by quarter: **21**–16, **20**–19, 14–**16**, **24**–16
	Pts: Deura 27; Rebs: Gajić 10; Asts: Vrančić 4	Boxscore	Pts: Oroszová 24; Rebs: Oroszová 12; Asts: Bartánusová 6	Arena: Skenderija; Referees: Alfred Jovović (CRO), Serkan Emlek (TUR), Jelena Smiljanić (SRB)

15 November 2017	**Slovakia**	**78**–62	Iceland	Ružomberok
18:00 (UTC+1)	Scoring by quarter: 15–**17**, **22**–15, **20**–19, **21**–11
	Pts: Hruščáková, Oroszová 17; Rebs: Hruščáková 14; Asts: Kováčiková 4	Boxscore	Pts: H. Sverrisdóttir 22; Rebs: Kjartansdóttir 10; Asts: H. Sverrisdóttir 6	Arena: Športová hala Koniareň; Referees: Zoran Mitrovski (MKD), Karolina Andersson (FIN), Alexander Romanov (RUS)

15 November 2017	**Montenegro**	**76**–55	Bosnia and Herzegovina	Podgorica
19:00 (UTC+1)	Scoring by quarter: **21**–10, 16–**22**, **16**–11, **23**–12
	Pts: Dubljević 26; Rebs: Turčinović-Poček 8 Asts: Dubljević 4	Boxscore	Pts: Vrančić 10; Rebs: Gajić 11; Asts: Gajić 3	Arena: Verde Complex; Referees: Nikolaos Somos (GRE), Alija Ferevski (MKD), Tomislav Vovk (CRO)

10 February 2018	**Bosnia and Herzegovina**	**97**–67	Iceland	Sarajevo
17:00 (UTC+1)	Scoring by quarter: 22–22, **18**–14, **32**–14, **25**–17
	Pts: Gajić 31; Rebs: Gajić 16; Asts: A. Delić, Vrančić 7	Boxscore	Pts: H. Sverrisdóttir 32; Rebs: Kjartansdóttir 8 Asts: H. Sverrisdóttir 5	Arena: KSC Ilidža Gym; Referees: Tomislav Vovk (CRO), Bogdan Podar (ROU), Jelena Smiljanić (SRB)

10 February 2018	Montenegro	72–**73**	**Slovakia**	Podgorica
19:00 (UTC+1)	Scoring by quarter: **29**–17, 6–**21**, **18**–15, 19–**20**
	Pts: Jovanović 24; Rebs: Johnson 17; Asts: Mujović 8	Boxscore	Pts: Felixová 19; Rebs: Hruščáková 10; Asts: Bálintová 6	Arena: Verde Complex; Referees: Gentian Cici (ALB), Erion Hoxhaj (ALB), Aleksander Pavlov (MKD)

14 February 2018	**Slovakia**	**100**–95(OT)	Bosnia and Herzegovina	Ružomberok
18:00 (UTC+1)	Scoring by quarter: 16–**17**, 19–**21**, **17**–13, 18–**19**, Overtime: 11–11, 7–7, **12**–7
	Pts: Slamová 19; Rebs: Hruščáková 10; Asts: Bálintová 9	Boxscore	Pts: Gajić 39; Rebs: Gajić 19; Asts: Deura 6	Arena: Športová hala Koniareň; Referees: Sergey Krug (RUS), Sergey Mikhaylov (RUS), Mindaugas Večerskis (LTU)

14 February 2018	**Montenegro**	**69**–37	Iceland	Podgorica
19:00 (UTC+1)	Scoring by quarter: 12–**14**, **23**–17, **19**–3, **15**–3
	Pts: Johnson, Mujović 14; Rebs: Johnson 15; Asts: Mujović 6	Boxscore	Pts: H. Sverrisdóttir 22; Rebs: H. Sverrisdóttir 9 Asts: H. Sverrisdóttir, Þrastardóttir 3	Arena: Verde Complex; Referees: Zoran Mitrovski (MKD), Ivana Ivanović (SRB), Milen Tsvetkov (BUL)

17 November 2018	Iceland	52–**82**	**Slovakia**	Reykjavík
16:00 (UTC+0)	Scoring by quarter: 14–**22**, 17–**21**, 15–15, 6–**24**
	Pts: H. Sverrisdóttir 20; Rebs: H. Sverrisdóttir 5 Asts: B. Gunnarsdóttir 4	Boxscore	Pts: Oroszová 17; Rebs: Oroszová 13; Asts: Bálintová 4	Arena: Laugardalshöll; Referees: Paul Unsworth (GBR), Keith Williams (GBR), Csaba Cziffra (HUN)

17 November 2018	**Bosnia and Herzegovina**	**83**–68	Montenegro	Sarajevo
20:15 (UTC+1)	Scoring by quarter: **25**–22, **26**–12, **17**–15, 15–**19**
	Pts: Gajić 17; Rebs: Gajić 27; Asts: Deura 5	Boxscore	Pts: Johnson 25; Rebs: Johnson 16; Asts: Mujović 4	Arena: Skenderija; Referees: Özlem Yalman (TUR), Andrada Csender (ROU), Svetlana Stoyanova (BUL)

21 November 2018	Slovakia	68–**82**	**Montenegro**	Ružomberok
18:00 (UTC+1)	Scoring by quarter: 15–**17**, **20**–17, 11–**27**, **22**–21
	Pts: Bálintová 20; Rebs: Slamová 8 Asts: Bálintová 3	Boxscore	Pts: Johnson 27; Rebs: Johnson 16; Asts: Mujović, Vučetić 4	Arena: Športová hala Koniareň; Referees: Anton Makhlin (RUS), Martynas Gudas (LTU), Tamás Földházi (HUN)

21 November 2018	Iceland	74–**84**	**Bosnia and Herzegovina**	Reykjavík
19:45 (UTC+0)	Scoring by quarter: **26**–13, 15–**29**, 11–**14**, 22–**28**
	Pts: Kjartansdóttir 27; Rebs: H. Sverrisdóttir 14; Asts: H. Sverrisdóttir 9	Boxscore	Pts: Babić, Deura 15; Rebs: Gajić 14; Asts: four players 3	Arena: Laugardalshöll; Referees: Rune Ressel Larsen (DEN), Paulina Gajdosz (POL), Iain McDonald (GBR)

=== Group B ===
Pos	Team	Pld	W	L	PF	PA	PD	Pts	Qualification
1	Turkey	6	5	1	428	320	+108	**11 (Note: Turkey 120–114 Belarus)**	Final tournament
2	Belarus	6	5	1	448	358	+90	**11**	Final tournament
3	Poland	6	2	4	383	401	−18	**8**	
4	Estonia	6	0	6	349	529	−180	**6**	

Source: FIBA
Rules for classification: 1) Points; 2) Head-to-head; 3) Points difference; 4) Points scored.
Notes:

11 November 2017	Estonia	56–**81**	**Turkey**	Tallinn
17:00 (UTC+2)	Scoring by quarter: 15–**21**, 12–**28**, **17**–14, 12–**18**
	Pts: Pokk 19; Rebs: Köster 9 Asts: Asi 4	Boxscore	Pts: Köksal 14; Rebs: three players 5 Asts: Çakır 6	Arena: TTU Sport Centre; Referees: Juris Kokainis (LAT), Rickard Eriksson (SWE), Simon Unsworth (GBR)

11 November 2017	Poland	62–**70**	**Belarus**	Wałbrzych
17:45 (UTC+1)	Scoring by quarter: **17**–14, 15–15, 17–**28**, 13–13
	Pts: Kaczmarczyk 22; Rebs: Ziętara 7 Asts: Ziętara 7	Boxscore	Pts: Verameyenka 16; Rebs: Verameyenka 8 Asts: Likhtarovich, Snytsina 6	Arena: Aqua Zdrój Arena; Referees: Özlem Yalman (TUR), Johannes Sarekoski (FIN), Sergii Tyslenko (UKR)

15 November 2017	**Belarus**	**80**–63	Estonia	Minsk
18:00 (UTC+3)	Scoring by quarter: **23**–18, **20**–14, **22**–18, **15**–13
	Pts: Hasper 20; Rebs: Verameyenka 10; Asts: Likhtarovich 5	Boxscore	Pts: Anderson 22; Rebs: Köster 9 Asts: Piibur 4	Arena: Sports Palace; Referees: Andrada Csender (ROU), Milosav Kaluđerović (MNE), Anton Makhlin (RUS)

15 November 2017	**Turkey**	**73**–53	Poland	Ankara
19:30 (UTC+3)	Scoring by quarter: 9–**16**, **26**–14, **21**–12, **17**–11
	Pts: Hollingsworth, Köksal 14; Rebs: three players 8 Asts: Çakır 6	Boxscore	Pts: Pawlak 12; Rebs: Kaczmarczyk 6 Asts: Makurat 4	Arena: Ankara Arena; Referees: Ventsislav Velikov (BUL), Kfir Mualem (ISR), Evgeny Vetrov (RUS)

10 February 2018	Estonia	68–**87**	**Poland**	Tallinn
17:00 (UTC+2)	Scoring by quarter: 17–**23**, 19–**26**, 16–**23**, **17**–15
	Pts: Pokk 19; Rebs: Köster 12; Asts: Asi 5	Boxscore	Pts: Gajda 15; Rebs: Kaczmarczyk, Szajtauer 4 Asts: four players 3	Arena: TTU Sport Centre; Referees: Karolina Andersson (FIN), Sergiy Chaykovskyy (UKR), Simon Unsworth (GBR)web

10 February 2018	Belarus	54–**64**	**Turkey**	Minsk
19:30 (UTC+3)	Scoring by quarter: 8–**19**, **16**–13, 11–**18**, **19**–14
	Pts: Bentley 12; Rebs: Rytsikava 9 Asts: Leuchanka 4	Boxscore	Pts: Alben 19; Rebs: Canıtez 10; Asts: Alben 5	Arena: Sports Palace; Referees: Jasmina Juras (SRB), Pavel Fuska (SVK), Saša Maričić (SRB)

14 February 2018	**Turkey**	**86**–48	Estonia	Istanbul
19:00 (UTC+3)	Scoring by quarter: **21**–16, **17**–3, **27**–9, **21**–20
	Pts: Köksal 14; Rebs: Çağlar, Hollingsworth 6 Asts: Alben, Çakır 4	Boxscore	Pts: Anderson 11; Rebs: Köster 6 Asts: Asi 3	Arena: Ayhan Şahenk Sports Hall; Referees: Vasiliki Tsaroucha (GRE), Alakbar Hasanov (AZE), Sergii Tyslenko (UKR)

14 February 2018	**Belarus**	**71**–50	Poland	Minsk
19:00 (UTC+3)	Scoring by quarter: **13**–6, **23**–17, **15**–12, **20**–15
	Pts: Papova 13; Rebs: Papova 8 Asts: Snytsina, Ziuzkova 3	Boxscore	Pts: Gajda, Misiek 9 Rebs: Kaczmarczyk 7 Asts: Ziętara 2	Arena: Sports Palace; Referees: Marko Vučković (SLO), Elena Chernova (RUS), Marek Kúkelčík (SVK)

17 November 2018	Estonia	63–**113**	**Belarus**	Tallinn
17:00 (UTC+2)	Scoring by quarter: 15–**33**, 26–**28**, 9–**24**, 13–**28**
	Pts: Köster 17; Rebs: Köster 10; Asts: Teder 4	Boxscore	Pts: Hasper 25; Rebs: Hasper, Verameyenka 10; Asts: Verameyenka 11	Arena: TalTech Sports Hall; Referees: Elena Chernova (RUS), Henri Hilke (FIN), Tom De Lange (BEL)

17 November 2018	Poland	49–**68**	**Turkey**	Bydgoszcz
18:30 (UTC+1)	Scoring by quarter: 13–**14**, 9–**15**, 10–**26**, **17**–13
	Pts: Stankiewicz 11; Rebs: Poboży 8 Asts: Trzeciak 2	Boxscore	Pts: Alben 19; Rebs: Alben 8 Asts: Çakır 4	Arena: Artego Arena; Referees: Gintaras Vitkauskas (LTU), Vilius Mačiulaitis (LTU), Gatis Saliņš (LAT)

21 November 2018	Turkey	56–**60**	**Belarus**	Kayseri
18:00 (UTC+3)	Scoring by quarter: 17–17, **18**–15, 10–**14**, 11–**14**
	Pts: Çakır 14; Rebs: Alben 13; Asts: Alben 6	Boxscore	Pts: Snytsina 17; Rebs: Hasper 11; Asts: Hasper 3	Arena: Kadir Has Sports Center; Referees: Ognjen Jokić (MNE), Maka Kupatadze (GEO), Zoran Mitrovski (MKD)

21 November 2018	**Poland**	**82**–51	Estonia	Bydgoszcz
20:00 (UTC+1)	Scoring by quarter: **27**–6, 18–18, **24**–8, 13–**19**
	Pts: Poboży 16; Rebs: Kaczmarczyk 9 Asts: Gajda 7	Boxscore	Pts: Rausberg 14; Rebs: Köster 11; Asts: three players 2	Arena: Artego Arena; Referees: Sergey Krug (RUS), Veronika Vávrová (CZE), David Berekashvili (GEO)

=== Group C ===
Pos	Team	Pld	W	L	PF	PA	PD	Pts	Qualification
1	Russia	6	6	0	540	328	+212	**12**	Final tournament
2	Hungary	6	4	2	544	348	+196	**10**	Final tournament
3	Lithuania	6	2	4	550	413	+137	**8**	
4	Albania	6	0	6	266	811	−545	**6**	

Source: FIBA
Rules for classification: 1) Points; 2) Head-to-head; 3) Points difference; 4) Points scored.

11 November 2017	Albania	37–**122**	**Russia**	Tirana
18:00 (UTC+1)	Scoring by quarter: 4–**44**, 17–**21**, 6–**32**, 10–**25**
	Pts: E. Bujari, Lalaj 12; Rebs: Xhanaj 5 Asts: Qypi, Xhanaj 2	Boxscore	Pts: Vadeeva 18; Rebs: Tikhonenko 10; Asts: Zavialova 6	Arena: Feti Borova; Referees: Marko Vučković (SLO), Csaba Cziffra (HUN), Ivana Ivanović (SRB)

11 November 2017	Lithuania	70–**73**	**Hungary**	Kėdainiai
19:00 (UTC+2)	Scoring by quarter: 16–**19**, **22**–18, **19**–15, 13–**21**
	Pts: Petronytė 19; Rebs: Petronytė 9 Asts: Okockytė 10	Boxscore	Pts: Goree 21; Rebs: Goree 7 Asts: Simon 4	Arena: Kėdainiai Arena; Referees: Elena Chernova (RUS), Aliaksandr Syrytsa (BLR), Gavin Williams (GBR)

15 November 2017	**Russia**	**64**–62	Lithuania	Moscow
19:30 (UTC+3)	Scoring by quarter: 10–**12**, **26**–15, 12–**17**, 16–**18**
	Pts: Maiga 13; Rebs: Vadeeva 9 Asts: Belyakova, Tikhonenko 3	Boxscore	Pts: Petronytė 19; Rebs: Petronytė 9 Asts: Okockytė 5	Arena: Krylatskoye Sports Palace; Referees: Jasmina Juras (SRB), Serkan Emlek (TUR), Pavel Fuska (SVK)

15 November 2017	**Hungary**	**137**–48	Albania	Miskolc
20:00 (UTC+1)	Scoring by quarter: **27**–11, **39**–15, **28**–12, **43**–10
	Pts: Zele 25; Rebs: Határ 11; Asts: Medgyessy 10	Boxscore	Pts: Lalaj 10; Rebs: Aliaj 7 Asts: Aliaj 5	Arena: Generali Aréna; Referees: Luís Lopes (POR), Pascale Weiwers (LUX), Zdeno Zubák (SVK)

10 February 2018	Hungary	64–**71**	**Russia**	Miskolc
17:00 (UTC+1)	Scoring by quarter: 10–**18**, 13–**19**, 21–21, **20**–13
	Pts: Krivačević 13; Rebs: Goree, Krivačević 5 Asts: Krivačević 5	Boxscore	Pts: Musina 12; Rebs: Vadeeva 8 Asts: Beglova 6	Arena: Generali aréna Referees: Uroš Nikolić (SRB), Ilias Kounellis (CYP), Jelena Tomić (CRO)

10 February 2018	Albania	61–**119**	**Lithuania**	Tirana
18:30 (UTC+1)	Scoring by quarter: 21–**31**, 14–**31**, 22–**30**, 4–**27**
	Pts: Zykaj 19; Rebs: E. Bujari 5 Asts: three players 4	Boxscore	Pts: Petronytė 24; Rebs: Petronytė 11; Asts: Labuckienė 5	Arena: Feti Borova; Referees: Mila Cavara (BIH), Gordon Barbara (MLT), Milosav Kaluđerović (MNE)

14 February 2018	**Russia**	**148**–35	Albania	Perm
19:30 (UTC+5)	Scoring by quarter: **39**–11, **33**–12, **40**–10, **36**–2
	Pts: Vadeeva 24; Rebs: Musina, Vieru 14; Asts: Beglova 8	Boxscore	Pts: Xhanaj 5 Rebs: Xhanaj 3 Asts: three players 2	Arena: Universal Sports Palace Molot; Referees: Karolina Andersson (FIN), Piotr Ivashkov (BLR), Zdeno Zubák (SVK)

14 February 2018	**Hungary**	**78**–76	Lithuania	Miskolc
18:00 (UTC+1)	Scoring by quarter: 24–**25**, **21**–15, 16–**19**, 17–17
	Pts: Határ 20; Rebs: Studer 4 Asts: Raksányi, Studer 4	Boxscore	Pts: Nacickaitė, Petronytė 20; Rebs: Petronytė 8 Asts: Knyzaitė 4	Arena: Generali aréna Referees: Petar Denkovski (MKD), Jelena Smiljanić (SRB), Peter Zenis (SVK)

17 November 2018	Albania	27–**139**	**Hungary**	Tirana
17:00 (UTC+1)	Scoring by quarter: 11–**28**, 8–**31**, 2–**41**, 6–**39**
	Pts: G. Bujari 8 Rebs: Lalaj 10; Asts: Aliaj, E. Bujari 2	Boxscore	Pts: Fegyverneky, Határ 21; Rebs: Határ 10; Asts: Fegyverneky, Studer 7	Arena: Feti Borova; Referees: Alija Ferevski (MKD), Dardan Maxhuni (KOS), Ivan Mijalkovski (MKD)

17 November 2018	Lithuania	77–**79**	**Russia**	Kėdainiai
19:00 (UTC+2)	Scoring by quarter: **20**–17, 16–**21**, **23**–16, 18–**25**
	Pts: Nacickaitė 20; Rebs: Svarytė 6 Asts: Baltkojienė 8	Boxscore	Pts: Vadeeva 23; Rebs: Vadeeva 9 Asts: Beglova 8	Arena: Kėdainiai Arena; Referees: Kate Webb (GBR), Zdenko Zubák (SVK), Jonas Bille (DEN)

21 November 2018	**Russia**	**56**–53	Hungary	Yekaterinburg
19:00 (UTC+5)	Scoring by quarter: **16**–8, **13**–11, 13–**20**, 14–14
	Pts: Musina 20; Rebs: Musina 9 Asts: Beglova 4	Boxscore	Pts: Goree, Studer 12; Rebs: Határ 13; Asts: Raksányi 4	Arena: DIVS Sport Hall; Referees: Mart Uuehendrik (EST), Jelena Smiljanić (SRB), Ivor Matějek (CZE)

21 November 2018	**Lithuania**	**146**–58	Albania	Kėdainiai
18:30 (UTC+2)	Scoring by quarter: **35**–18, **43**–11, **37**–11, **31**–18
	Pts: Petronytė 27; Rebs: Šarauskaitė, Šikšniūtė 15; Asts: Juškaitė 9	Boxscore	Pts: Xhanaj 21; Rebs: Xhanaj 10; Asts: Xhanaj 6	Arena: Kėdainiai Arena; Referees: Kristaps Konstantinovs (LAT), Anastasiya Slozhenitsina (AZE), Silvia Rath (AUT)

=== Group D ===
Pos	Team	Pld	W	L	PF	PA	PD	Pts	Qualification
1	Great Britain	6	5	1	451	397	+54	**11**	Final tournament
2	Greece	6	4	2	431	379	+52	**10**	
3	Israel	6	2	4	414	443	−29	**8**	
4	Portugal	6	1	5	348	425	−77	**7**	

Source: FIBA
Rules for classification: 1) Points; 2) Head-to-head; 3) Points difference; 4) Points scored.

11 November 2017	Portugal	60–**66**	**Greece**	Almada
17:30 (UTC+0)	Scoring by quarter: 11–**22**, 14–**15**, 17–17, **18**–12
	Pts: C. Silva 18; Rebs: L. Silva 6 Asts: Brandão 6	Boxscore	Pts: Kaltsidou 15; Rebs: Kaltsidou 7 Asts: Kaltsidou 5	Arena: Complexo Municipal dos Desportos Cidade de Almada; Referees: Jasmina Juras (SRB), Haydn Jones (GBR), Goran Sljivic (AUT)

11 November 2017	**Great Britain**	**90**–87(OT)	Israel	Manchester
19:30 (UTC+0)	Scoring by quarter: **21**–17, 9–**19**, **26**–15, 21–**26**, Overtime: **13**–10
	Pts: Leedham-Warner 22; Rebs: Leedham-Warner 13; Asts: Vanderwal 7	Boxscore	Pts: Levitsky 23; Rebs: Ben-Nun, Levitsky 5 Asts: Shafir 9	Arena: Belle Vue Sports Village; Referees: Konstantin Simonow (GER), Rune Ressel Larsen (DEN), Bernard Vassallo (MLT)

15 November 2017	**Greece**	**61**–59	Great Britain	Kozani
17:00 (UTC+2)	Scoring by quarter: 13–13, **17**–13, **16**–13, 15–**20**
	Pts: Christinaki 18; Rebs: Spanou 10; Asts: Kaltsidou 5	Boxscore	Pts: Leedham-Warner 17; Rebs: Leedham-Warner 10; Asts: Jones, Leedham-Warner 3	Arena: Lefkovrisi Kozanis Sports Centre; Referees: Vladimir Tsekov (BUL), Nikola Perlić (CRO), Jelena Smiljanić (SRB)

15 November 2017	**Israel**	**59**–56	Portugal	Tel Aviv
19:30 (UTC+2)	Scoring by quarter: 12–**18**, 16–**19**, **14**–8, **17**–11
	Pts: Clark 19; Rebs: Clark 10; Asts: Shafir 4	Boxscore	Pts: C. Silva 12; Rebs: C. Silva 8 Asts: Brandão 4	Arena: Drive in Arena; Referees: Sergey Krug (RUS), Maka Kupatadze (GEO), Bogdan Podar (ROU)

10 February 2018	**Israel**	**65**–63	Greece	Tel Aviv
19:40 (UTC+2)	Scoring by quarter: **20**–19, **13**–12, 19–**20**, **13**–12
	Pts: Clark 27; Rebs: Clark 16; Asts: Clark 6	Boxscore	Pts: Maltsi 14; Rebs: Spanou 10; Asts: three players 3	Arena: Drive in Arena; Referees: Janusz Calik (POL), Andrada Csender (ROU), Alexey Davydov (RUS)

10 February 2018	Portugal	56–**64**	**Great Britain**	Loulé
21:00 (UTC+0)	Scoring by quarter: **20**–14, 12–**17**, **20**–16, 4–**17**
	Pts: Correia 16; Rebs: S. Silva 11; Asts: Brandão 4	Boxscore	Pts: Handy 21; Rebs: Fagbenle 10; Asts: Collins, Handy 3	Arena: Pavilhão Desportivo Municipal de Loulé; Referees: Tamás Benczur (HUN), Vincent Delestrée (BEL), Michel Glod (LUX)

14 February 2018	**Greece**	**81**–59	Portugal	Chalcis
17:00 (UTC+2)	Scoring by quarter: **25**–23, **21**–11, **21**–14, **14**–11
	Pts: Maltsi 20; Rebs: Chatzinikolaou, Fasoula 6 Asts: Maltsi 6	Boxscore	Pts: Correia 24; Rebs: S. Silva 7 Asts: Brandão, Domingues 2	Arena: Tasos Kampouris Indoor Hall; Referees: Alexandru Olaru (ROU), Mila Cavara (BIH), Wojciech Liszka (POL)

14 February 2018	Israel	74–**76**	**Great Britain**	Tel Aviv
20:30 (UTC+2)	Scoring by quarter: **17**–13, 22–**23**, 20–20, 15–**20**
	Pts: Clark 20; Rebs: Levitsky 12; Asts: Clark 7	Boxscore	Pts: Fagbenle 21; Rebs: Fagbenle 14; Asts: Vanderwal 6	Arena: Drive in Arena; Referees: Jasmina Juras (SRB), Vladyslav Isachenko (UKR), Jelena Tomić (CRO)

17 November 2018	**Portugal**	**75**–72	Israel	Matosinhos
18:00 (UTC+0)	Scoring by quarter: **20**–10, 15–**20**, **16**–13, 24–**29**
	Pts: S. Silva 20; Rebs: S. Silva 13; Asts: Soeiro 5	Boxscore	Pts: Doron 23; Rebs: Clark 9 Asts: Shafir 6	Arena: Pavilhão Municipal de Guifões; Referees: Antonio Zamora (AND), Marc Mouton (LUX), James Kerry Dominique (GBR)

17 November 2018	**Great Britain**	**79**–77	Greece	Manchester
19:00 (UTC+0)	Scoring by quarter: **16**–8, **23**–17, 22–**33**, 18–**19**
	Pts: Leedham 21; Rebs: Fagbenle 10; Asts: Leedham, Vanderwal 5	Boxscore	Pts: Kaltsidou 21; Rebs: Spanou 5 Asts: Kaltsidou 3	Arena: Belle Vue Sports Village; Referees: Marek Maliszewski (POL), Esperanza Mendoza Holgado (ESP), Thomas Kerisit (FRA)

21 November 2018	**Greece**	**83**–57	Israel	Kozani
17:00 (UTC+2)	Scoring by quarter: **14**–10, **28**–13, **22**–21, **19**–13
	Pts: Maltsi 25; Rebs: Spanou 11; Asts: Lymoura 4	Boxscore	Pts: Clark 17; Rebs: Clark 11; Asts: Doron 3	Arena: Lefkovrisi Kozanis Sports Centre; Referees: Aleksandar Milojević (MKD), Alin Faur (ROU), Alexander Romanov (RUS)

21 November 2018	**Great Britain**	**83**–42	Portugal	Manchester
19:00 (UTC+0)	Scoring by quarter: **20**–9, **13**–10, **20**–8, **30**–15
	Pts: Vanderwal 21; Rebs: Leedham 12; Asts: Leedham, Samuelson 7	Boxscore	Pts: Viana 9 Rebs: S. Silva 7 Asts: Viana 3	Arena: Belle Vue Sports Village; Referees: Aðalsteinn Hjartarson (ISL), Marion Ortis (FRA), Jóhannes Páll Friðriksson (ISL)

=== Group E ===
Pos	Team	Pld	W	L	PF	PA	PD	Pts	Qualification
1	France	6	5	1	520	302	+218	**11 (Note: France 150–112 Slovenia)**	Final tournament
2	Slovenia	6	5	1	455	404	+51	**11**	Final tournament
3	Romania	6	2	4	386	454	−68	**8**	
4	Finland	6	0	6	328	529	−201	**6**	

Source: FIBA
Rules for classification: 1) Points; 2) Head-to-head; 3) Points difference; 4) Points scored.
Notes:

11 November 2017	Romania	59–**80**	**Slovenia**	Oradea
18:00 (UTC+2)	Scoring by quarter: **25**–18, 12–**29**, 9–**26**, **13**–7
	Pts: Walker 17; Rebs: Walker 7 Asts: Mărginean 4	Boxscore	Pts: Lisec 26; Rebs: three players 5 Asts: Barič 7	Arena: Arena Antonio Alexe; Referees: Vasiliki Tsaroucha (GRE), Uroš Nikolić (SRB), Dumitru Stasiev (MDA)

11 November 2017	Finland	44–**103**	**France**	Helsinki
18:30 (UTC+2)	Scoring by quarter: 15–**29**, 8–**32**, 17–**18**, 4–**24**
	Pts: Holopainen 8 Rebs: Kuier 6 Asts: Mäkitalo 4	Boxscore	Pts: Gruda 21; Rebs: three players 7 Asts: Époupa 9	Arena: Töölö Sports Hall; Referees: Mindaugas Večerskis (LTU), Stanislav Kučera (CZE), Mart Uuehendrik (EST)

15 November 2017	**Slovenia**	**97**–57	Finland	Celje
20:15 (UTC+1)	Scoring by quarter: **26**–12, **28**–11, **25**–19, **18**–15
	Pts: Prezelj 18; Rebs: Lisec 13; Asts: Oblak 7	Boxscore	Pts: Tuukkanen 16; Rebs: Tuukkanen 14; Asts: Tuukkanen 3	Arena: Gimnazija Celje - Center; Referees: Özlem Yalman (TUR), Bojan Jovanović (BIH), Jelena Tomić (CRO)

15 November 2017	**France**	**87**–45	Romania	Villeneuve-d'Ascq
20:30 (UTC+1)	Scoring by quarter: **15**–11, **27**–15, **22**–11, **23**–8
	Pts: Gruda 23; Rebs: Gruda 9 Asts: Époupa 8	Boxscore	Pts: Mărginean 13; Rebs: Godri-Părău, Walker 3 Asts: Godri-Părău 2	Arena: Palacium; Referees: Anthonie Sinterniklaas (NED), Samira Barrima (POR), Sigmundur Herbertsson (ISL)

10 February 2018	Finland	59–**80**	**Romania**	Helsinki
14:00 (UTC+2)	Scoring by quarter: 17–**22**, 14–**25**, 10–**18**, **18**–15
	Pts: Tuukkanen 24; Rebs: Tuukkanen 17; Asts: Bejedi 5	Boxscore	Pts: Walker 17; Rebs: Walker 9 Asts: Godri-Părău 6	Arena: Töölö Sports Hall; Referees: Kate Webb (GBR), Rickard Eriksson (SWE), Rune Ressel Larsen (DEN)

10 February 2018	**Slovenia**	**68**–62	France	Celje
17:00 (UTC+1)	Scoring by quarter: 19–**22**, **19**–12, 17–17, **13**–11
	Pts: Oblak 18; Rebs: Evans 12; Asts: Oblak 10	Boxscore	Pts: Gruda 24; Rebs: Époupa 9 Asts: Époupa 8	Arena: Gimnazija Celje - Center; Referees: Elena Chernova (RUS), Ilya Putenko (RUS), Christoph Rohacky (AUT)

14 February 2018	**Slovenia**	**78**–70	Romania	Celje
18:00 (UTC+1)	Scoring by quarter: 13–**17**, **26**–22, **21**–15, **18**–16
	Pts: Oblak 24; Rebs: Evans 6 Asts: Abramovič 5	Boxscore	Pts: Walker 21; Rebs: Pavel, Walker 7 Asts: Godri-Părău 6	Arena: Gimnazija Celje - Center; Referees: Nikola Perlić (CRO), Ernad Karović (BIH), Anton Makhlin (RUS)

14 February 2018	**France**	**90**–40	Finland	Brest
20:30 (UTC+1)	Scoring by quarter: **22**–8, **22**–15, **23**–6, **23**–11
	Pts: Gruda 27; Rebs: Ciak, Johannès 5 Asts: Époupa 7	Boxscore	Pts: Holopainen 16; Rebs: Kuier 10; Asts: Kuier 5	Arena: Brest Arena; Referees: Viola Györgyi (HUN), Carlos Santos (POR), Pascale Weiwers (LUX)

17 November 2018	Finland	68–**88**	**Slovenia**	Helsinki
18:30 (UTC+2)	Scoring by quarter: **18**–16, 9–**25**, **21**–20, 20–**27**
	Pts: Bejedi 19; Rebs: Tuukkanen 12; Asts: Tuukkanen 6	Boxscore	Pts: Evans 19; Rebs: Lisec 9 Asts: Oblak 8	Arena: Töölö Sports Hall; Referees: Goran Sljivic (AUT), Mariann Miklosik (GBR), Bert van Slooten (NED)

17 November 2018	Romania	61–**90**	**France**	Cluj-Napoca
19:00 (UTC+2)	Scoring by quarter: 18–**21**, 13–**21**, 14–**27**, 16–**21**
	Pts: Mărginean 18; Rebs: Pavel, Walker 6 Asts: Mărginean 4	Boxscore	Pts: Ciak 15; Rebs: Gruda 8 Asts: Hartley, Michel 5	Arena: Horia Demian Sports Hall; Referees: Sinem Tetik (TUR), Martina Mekelová (SVK), Maria Ignatiou (CYP)

21 November 2018	**Romania**	**71**–60	Finland	Cluj-Napoca
20:00 (UTC+2)	Scoring by quarter: 21–**25**, 7–**9**, **14**–13, **29**–13
	Pts: Mărginean 25; Rebs: Walker 15; Asts: Walker 8	Boxscore	Pts: Bejedi 21; Rebs: Tuukkanen 13; Asts: Bejedi 5	Arena: Horia Demian Sports Hall; Referees: Sergey Mikhaylov (RUS), Vladimir Zanev (CYP), Daut Mehmeti (KOS)

21 November 2018	**France**	**88**–44	Slovenia	Charleville-Mézières
20:45 (UTC+1)	Scoring by quarter: **31**–9, **16**–9, **24**–15, **17**–11
	Pts: Miyem 17; Rebs: Miyem 11; Asts: Hartley 5	Boxscore	Pts: Friškovec 12; Rebs: Lisec 8 Asts: Barič 3	Arena: Caisse d'épargne Arena; Referees: Paulo Marques (POR), Maciej Nazimek (IRL), Francisco Araña (ESP)

=== Group F ===
Pos	Team	Pld	W	L	PF	PA	PD	Pts	Qualification
1	Spain	6	6	0	502	312	+190	**12**	Final tournament
2	Ukraine	6	4	2	475	367	+108	**10**	Final tournament
3	Netherlands	6	2	4	353	459	−106	**8**	
4	Bulgaria	6	0	6	349	541	−192	**6**	

Source: FIBA
Rules for classification: 1) Points; 2) Head-to-head; 3) Points difference; 4) Points scored.

11 November 2017	Bulgaria	42–**92**	**Spain**	Sofia
19:00 (UTC+2)	Scoring by quarter: 14–**21**, 12–**21**, 10–**26**, 6–**24**
	Pts: three players 8 Rebs: Peteva, Voynova 5 Asts: Stoycheva 4	Boxscore	Pts: Nicholls 14; Rebs: Ndour 9 Asts: four players 4	Arena: Universiada Hall; Referees: Maka Kupatadze (GEO), Alakbar Hasanov (AZE), Alexandru Olaru (ROU)

11 November 2017	Netherlands	58–**72**	**Ukraine**	Amsterdam
20:00 (UTC+1)	Scoring by quarter: 20–**25**, **21**–15, 10–**17**, 7–**15**
	Pts: Treffers 11; Rebs: Treffers 13; Asts: Bröring 4	Boxscore	Pts: Iagupova 33; Rebs: Iagupova 10; Asts: Moss 4	Arena: Sporthallen Zuid; Referees: Petar Denkovski (MKD), Samira Barrima (POR), Marc Mouton (LUX)

15 November 2017	**Ukraine**	**94**–44	Bulgaria	Kyiv
19:00 (UTC+2)	Scoring by quarter: **23**–16, **29**–9, **23**–6, **19**–13
	Pts: Iagupova 41; Rebs: Moss 10; Asts: Iagupova 4	Boxscore	Pts: Stoycheva 8 Rebs: Kostova 8 Asts: H. Ivanova, Peteva 3	Arena: Palace of Sports; Referees: Aleksander Pavlov (MKD), Ivana Ivanović (SRB), Chrysostomos Schinas (GRE)

15 November 2017	**Spain**	**92**–26	Netherlands	Valladolid
20:00 (UTC+1)	Scoring by quarter: **28**–5, **17**–11, **21**–2, **26**–8
	Pts: Xargay 22; Rebs: Nicholls 10; Asts: Torrens 5	Boxscore	Pts: J. Bettonvil, Butter 5 Rebs: Van Grinsven 9 Asts: six players 1	Arena: Pabellón Polideportivo Pisuerga; Referees: Sonia Teixeira (POR), Shane Bassett (GIB), Alessandro Martolini (ITA)

10 February 2018	Ukraine	68–**72**	**Spain**	Kyiv
16:00 (UTC+2)	Scoring by quarter: **21**–15, 14–**23**, 18–**19**, 15–15
	Pts: Udodenko 21; Rebs: Udodenko 10; Asts: Naumemko 5	Boxscore	Pts: Torrens 18; Rebs: Nicholls 5 Asts: Torrens, Xargay 5	Arena: Palace of Sports; Referees: Özlem Yalman (TUR), Andrei Sharapa (BLR), Zdenko Tomašovič (SVK)

10 February 2018	Bulgaria	78–**83**	**Netherlands**	Sofia
18:30 (UTC+2)	Scoring by quarter: 20–**25**, **21**–18, **22**–17, 15–**23**
	Pts: Georgieva 20; Rebs: Voynova 5 Asts: Kocheva 8	Boxscore	Pts: Van Grinsven 24; Rebs: Ndiba 8 Asts: Bröring 7	Arena: Universiada Hall; Referees: Ernad Karović (BIH), Ivana Ivanović (SRB), Sarty Nghixulifwa (NAM)

13 February 2018	**Spain**	**97**–57	Bulgaria	Guadalajara
20:00 (UTC+1)	Scoring by quarter: **28**–15, **28**–11, **23**–14, **18**–17
	Pts: Casas, Xargay 14; Rebs: Gil 8 Asts: Palau 4	Boxscore	Pts: Georgieva 11; Rebs: Georgieva 9 Asts: Kocheva 3	Arena: Aguas Vivas; Referees: Paulo Marques (POR), Samira Barrima (POR), Paul Unswoth (GBR)

14 February 2018	**Ukraine**	**84**–49	Netherlands	Kyiv
19:00 (UTC+2)	Scoring by quarter: **17**–7, **22**–16, **24**–16, **21**–10
	Pts: Iagupova 39; Rebs: Iagupova 10; Asts: Bilotserkivska, Udodenko 5	Boxscore	Pts: Van Grinsven 14; Rebs: Van Grinsven 7 Asts: Bröring 5	Arena: Palace of Sports; Referees: Maka Kupatadze (GEO), Serkan Emlek (TUR), Dumitru Stasiev (MDA)

17 November 2018	Bulgaria	60–**86**	**Ukraine**	Sofia
18:00 (UTC+2)	Scoring by quarter: 15–**21**, 15–**19**, 5–**24**, **25**–22
	Pts: Ivanova 15; Rebs: Georgieva 11; Asts: Ivanova 8	Boxscore	Pts: Iagupova 32; Rebs: Naumemko, Uro-Nile 6 Asts: Iagupova 6	Arena: Universiada Hall; Referees: Ciprian Stoica (ROU), Sarty Nghixulifwa (NAM), Guy Simany (ISR)

17 November 2018	Netherlands	48–**65**	**Spain**	Amsterdam
20:00 (UTC+1)	Scoring by quarter: 11–**22**, 11–**13**, **16**–12, 10–**18**
	Pts: Van den Adel 10; Rebs: Boonstra 9 Asts: Broring 4	Boxscore	Pts: Ouviña 12; Rebs: Ndour 13; Asts: Domínguez 3	Arena: Sporthallen Zuid; Referees: Sonia Teixeira (POR), Karolina Andersson (FIN), Martin Van Hoye (BEL)

21 November 2018	**Netherlands**	**89**–68	Bulgaria	Amsterdam
20:00 (UTC+1)	Scoring by quarter: **28**–14, 18–**20**, **18**–16, **25**–18
	Pts: Butter 20; Rebs: Boonstra 11; Asts: Kuijt 7	Boxscore	Pts: Kostova 16; Rebs: Georgieva 8 Asts: Kocheva 5	Arena: Sporthallen Zuid; Referees: Gavin Williams (GBR), Blazo Begenisic (SWE), Samira Barrima (POR)

21 November 2018	**Spain**	**84**–71	Ukraine	Melilla
20:00 (UTC+1)	Scoring by quarter: **21**–14, 18–18, 22–**24**, **23**–15
	Pts: Xargay 23; Rebs: Nicholls 8 Asts: Domínguez 7	Boxscore	Pts: Iagupova 28; Rebs: three players 6 Asts: Udodenko 6	Arena: Pabellón Javier Imbroda Ortiz; Referees: Pedro Coelho (POR), Jelena Tomić (SRB), Christina Manoli (FRA)

=== Group G ===
Pos	Team	Pld	W	L	PF	PA	PD	Pts	Qualification
1	Czech Republic	6	5	1	436	325	+111	**11 (Note: Czech Republic 115–114 Belgium)**	Final tournament
2	Belgium	6	5	1	477	348	+129	**11**	Final tournament
3	Germany	6	2	4	375	457	−82	**8**	
4	Switzerland	6	0	6	309	467	−158	**6**	

Source: FIBA
Rules for classification: 1) Points; 2) Head-to-head; 3) Points difference; 4) Points scored.
Notes:

11 November 2017	Switzerland	56–**85**	**Belgium**	Fribourg
17:30 (UTC+1)	Scoring by quarter: 13–**23**, 11–**16**, 18–**26**, 14–**20**
	Pts: Fora, Giroud 15; Rebs: Giroud 6 Asts: Herminjard 5	Boxscore	Pts: Meesseman 26; Rebs: Hendrickx 7 Asts: Carpréaux, Vanloo 7	Arena: Site Sportif Saint-Leonard; Referees: Gellért Kapitány (HUN), Igor Esteve Malmierca (AND), Alin Faur (ROU)

11 November 2017	Germany	56–**89**	**Czech Republic**	Saarlouis
20:00 (UTC+1)	Scoring by quarter: **18**–14, 18–**22**, 16–**28**, 4–**25**
	Pts: Greinacher 12; Rebs: Grigoleit 5 Asts: Brodersen 5	Boxscore	Pts: Hanušová 21; Rebs: Hejdová, Voráčková 5 Asts: Kat. Elhotová, Hanušová 4	Arena: Stadtgartenhalle Saarlouis; Referees: Jelena Tomić (CRO), Chris Dodds (GBR), Charalampos Karakatsounis (GRE)

15 November 2017	**Czech Republic**	**62**–35	Switzerland	Prague
20:10 (UTC+1)	Scoring by quarter: **16**–10, 10–**12**, **23**–7, **13**–6
	Pts: Kar. Elhotová 13; Rebs: Hanušová 9 Asts: Bartáková, Voráčková 4	Boxscore	Pts: Giroud 17; Rebs: Giroud 14; Asts: Michaux, Simioni 2	Arena: Královka Arena; Referees: Elena Chernova (RUS), Pedro Coelho (POR), Erion Hoxhaj (ALB)

15 November 2017	**Belgium**	**103**–60	Germany	Kortrijk
20:30 (UTC+1)	Scoring by quarter: **28**–17, **24**–8, **37**–16, 14–**19**
	Pts: Meesseman 31; Rebs: Wauters 8 Asts: Carpréaux 9	Boxscore	Pts: Bertholdt, Brunckhorst 13; Rebs: Greinacher 8 Asts: Brunckhorst 4	Arena: Sportcampus Lange Munte; Referees: Mart Uuehendrik (EST), Maciej Nazimek (IRL), Carlos Santos (POR)

10 February 2018	Switzerland	54–**56**	**Germany**	Fribourg
17:30 (UTC+1)	Scoring by quarter: **17**–6, **21**–14, 9–**19**, 7–**17**
	Pts: Baumann 11; Rebs: Giroud 10; Asts: Fora 3	Boxscore	Pts: Greunke 19; Rebs: Greunke 17; Asts: Brodersen 6	Arena: Site Sportif Saint-Leonard; Referees: Sonia Teixeira (POR), Peter Papp (HUN), Anthonie Sinterniklaas (NED)

10 February 2018	**Czech Republic**	**53**–48	Belgium	Prague
18:00 (UTC+1)	Scoring by quarter: 12–**20**, **15**–7, **19**–13, 7–**8**
	Pts: Hanušová 16; Rebs: Hejdová 8 Asts: Hejdová, Voráčková 3	Boxscore	Pts: Meesseman 23; Rebs: Meesseman 12; Asts: Linskens 4	Arena: Královka Arena; Referees: Vasiliki Tsaroucha (GRE), Luka Kardum (CRO), Marco Vladic (AUT)

14 February 2018	**Czech Republic**	**82**–67	Germany	Prague
18:00 (UTC+1)	Scoring by quarter: **19**–10, **19**–13, 22–**23**, **22**–21
	Pts: Hanušová 27; Rebs: Hanušová 9 Asts: Bartáková 7	Boxscore	Pts: Greunke, Schaake 14; Rebs: Brunckhorst 10; Asts: Brodersen 5	Arena: Královka Arena; Referees: Dariusz Zapolski (POL), Andrada Csender (ROU), Sarty Nghixulifwa (NAM)

14 February 2018	**Belgium**	**98**–59	Switzerland	Kortrijk
20:30 (UTC+1)	Scoring by quarter: **26**–16, **24**–13, **29**–19, **19**–11
	Pts: Meesseman 19; Rebs: three players 5 Asts: Vanloo 8	Boxscore	Pts: Giroud 28; Rebs: Giroud 8 Asts: Fora, Herminjard 3	Arena: Sportcampus Lange Munte; Referees: Johannes Sarekoski (FIN), Shane Bassett (GIB), David Caballe (IRL)

17 November 2018	Switzerland	53–**88**	**Czech Republic**	Fribourg
17:30 (UTC+1)	Scoring by quarter: 19–**23**, 11–**23**, 13–**21**, 10–**21**
	Pts: Simoni 13; Rebs: Giroud 7 Asts: Herminjard 5	Boxscore	Pts: Kar. Elhotová 20; Rebs: Hejdová 9 Asts: Bartáková 10	Arena: Site Sportif Saint-Leonard; Referees: Ivana Ivanović (SRB), Özge Şentürk (TUR), Emma Perry (IRL)

17 November 2018	Germany	58–**77**	**Belgium**	Marburg
19:30 (UTC+1)	Scoring by quarter: **22**–16, 11–**21**, 10–**17**, 15–**23**
	Pts: Greinacher 12; Rebs: Stach 7 Asts: Stach 6	Boxscore	Pts: Meesseman 28; Rebs: Linskens, K. Mestdagh 9 Asts: Linskens 5	Arena: Sporthalle Georg-Gaßmann-Stadion; Referees: Jasmina Juras (SRB), Mila Čavara (BIH), Silvia Marziali (ITA)

21 November 2018	**Germany**	**78**–52	Switzerland	Wolfenbüttel
19:30 (UTC+1)	Scoring by quarter: **21**–14, **20**–16, **21**–12, **16**–10
	Pts: Gulich 24; Rebs: Gulich 7 Asts: Brunckhorst, Fiebich 4	Boxscore	Pts: Giroud 21; Rebs: Giroud 8 Asts: three players 4	Arena: Lindenhalle Wolfenbüttel; Referees: Dumitru Stasiev (MDA), Can Mavisu (TUR), Joona Haaja (FIN)

21 November 2018	**Belgium**	**66**–62	Czech Republic	Kortrijk
20:30 (UTC+1)	Scoring by quarter: 12–**14**, **21**–7, 17–**20**, 16–**21**
	Pts: Meesseman 19; Rebs: Linskens, Meesseman 8 Asts: Meesseman 7	Boxscore	Pts: Hejdová 21; Rebs: Hejdová 11; Asts: Bartáková 4	Arena: Sportcampus Lange Munte; Referees: Özlem Yalman (TUR), Chris Dodds (GBR), Nikolaos Somos (GRE)

=== Group H ===
Pos	Team	Pld	W	L	PF	PA	PD	Pts	Qualification
1	Italy	6	5	1	420	323	+97	**11**	Final tournament
2	Sweden	6	4	2	432	339	+93	**10**	Final tournament
3	Croatia	6	3	3	442	329	+113	**9**	
4	Macedonia	6	0	6	258	561	−303	**6**	

Source: FIBA
Rules for classification: 1) Points; 2) Head-to-head; 3) Points difference; 4) Points scored.

11 November 2017	Macedonia	52–**61**	**Italy**	Skopje
17:00 (UTC+1)	Scoring by quarter: 14–**19**, 11–**14**, **13**–11, 14–**17**
	Pts: Givens 22; Rebs: Kmetovska 9 Asts: Mitrašinović 4	Boxscore	Pts: Cinili 12; Rebs: Andrè 12; Asts: Zandalasini 7	Arena: Jane Sandanski Arena II; Referees: Andrada Csender (ROU), Ivan Milićević (BIH), Vladimir Tsekov (BUL)

11 November 2017	Croatia	54–**57**	**Sweden**	Zagreb
18:00 (UTC+1)	Scoring by quarter: 14–**16**, 15–**17**, **17**–16, 8–8
	Pts: Režan 19; Rebs: Režan 9 Asts: Sandrić 4	Boxscore	Pts: Zahui 18; Rebs: Zahui 17; Asts: E. Eldebrink 5	Arena: Športska dvorana Trnsko; Referees: Sonia Teixeira (POR), Boris Krejić (SLO), Ilya Putenko (RUS)

15 November 2017	**Sweden**	**91**–51	Macedonia	Södertälje
18:35 (UTC+1)	Scoring by quarter: **20**–18, **23**–12, **22**–13, **26**–8
	Pts: Zahui 19; Rebs: Zahui 16; Asts: F. Eldebrink 8	Boxscore	Pts: Givens 18; Rebs: Givens 7 Asts: Mitrašinović 4	Arena: Täljehallen; Referees: Martynas Gudas (LTU), Yury Ihnatsyeu (BLR), Bert van Slooten (NED)

15 November 2017	Italy	71–**83**	**Croatia**	San Martino di Lupari
20:30 (UTC+1)	Scoring by quarter: **21**–16, 11–**14**, 15–**28**, 24–**25**
	Pts: Sottana 25; Rebs: Zandalasini 10; Asts: F. Dotto 4	Boxscore	Pts: Režan 35; Rebs: Režan 13; Asts: Premasunac 7	Arena: Palazzetto dello Sport Palalupe; Referees: Vasiliki Tsaroucha (GRE), Tamás Benczur (HUN), Zdenko Tomašovič (SVK)

10 February 2018	Sweden	47–**69**	**Italy**	Borås
15:30 (UTC+1)	Scoring by quarter: 12–**21**, 7–**12**, 14–**16**, 14–**20**
	Pts: Zahui 16; Rebs: Zahui 9 Asts: E. Eldebrink, F. Eldebrink 5	Boxscore	Pts: Sottana 22; Rebs: Andrè, Nicolodi 9 Asts: F. Dotto 4	Arena: Boråshallen; Referees: Ivor Matějek (CZE), Henri Hilke (FIN), Michał Proc (POL)

10 February 2018	Macedonia	47–**108**	**Croatia**	Skopje
20:45 (UTC+1)	Scoring by quarter: 12–**27**, 8–**21**, 19–**28**, 8–**32**
	Pts: Mitrašinović 22; Rebs: Mitrašinović, Trajchevska 7 Asts: Mitrašinović 3	Boxscore	Pts: Sandrić 22; Rebs: Begić, Režan 7 Asts: Sandrić 8	Arena: Boris Trajkovski Sports Center; Referees: Ciprian Stoica (ROU), Alin Faur (ROU), Maka Kupatadze (GEO)

14 February 2018	**Italy**	**93**–33	Macedonia	Pavia
18:30 (UTC+1)	Scoring by quarter: **25**–4, **31**–15, **15**–11, **22**–3
	Pts: Zandalasini 21; Rebs: Andrè 11; Asts: F. Dotto, Sottana 6	Boxscore	Pts: Mitrašinović 9 Rebs: Kmetovska 9 Asts: Kmetovska 2	Arena: PalaRavizza; Referees: Sébastien Clivaz (SUI), Luís Lopes (POR), Bernard Vassallo (MLT)

14 February 2018	**Sweden**	**63**–55	Croatia	Stockholm
18:35 (UTC+1)	Scoring by quarter: 16–**19**, **16**–11, **17**–14, **14**–11
	Pts: Loyd 12; Rebs: Zahui 16; Asts: E. Eldebrink 7	Boxscore	Pts: Režan 23; Rebs: three players 9 Asts: Sandrić 6	Arena: Hovet; Referees: Özlem Yalman (TUR), Mārtiņš Kozlovskis (LAT), Gintaras Vitkauskas (LTU)

17 November 2018	Croatia	52–**64**	**Italy**	Slavonski Brod
19:00 (UTC+1)	Scoring by quarter: 15–**17**, 11–**15**, 14–**18**, 12–**14**
	Pts: Tikvić 11; Rebs: Režan 8 Asts: Dojkić 3	Boxscore	Pts: Penna 17; Rebs: five players 4 Asts: Zandalasini 4	Arena: Sports Hall Vijuš; Referees: Vasiliki Tsaroucha (GRE), Alexandra Stan (ROU), Gellért Kapitány (HUN)

17 November 2018	Macedonia	48–**118**	**Sweden**	Skopje
20:15 (UTC+1)	Scoring by quarter: 6–**34**, 14–**30**, 17–**24**, 11–**30**
	Pts: Stojanovska 21; Rebs: Stojanovska 10; Asts: Mitrašinović 3	Boxscore	Pts: F. Eldebrink 22; Rebs: Halvarsson, Zahui 10; Asts: E. Eldebrink 10	Arena: Jane Sandanski Arena; Referees: Vladimir Tsekov (BUL), Erion Hoxhaj (ALB), Dénes Tőzsér (HUN)

21 November 2018	**Croatia**	**90**–27	Macedonia	Zabok
19:00 (UTC+1)	Scoring by quarter: **23**–11, **26**–5, **19**–6, **22**–5
	Pts: Tikvić 15; Rebs: Premasunac 8 Asts: Sandrić 4	Boxscore	Pts: Mitrašinović 14; Rebs: Kmetovska, Lazareska 6 Asts: Mitrašinović, Nikolić 2	Arena: Sports hall Zabok; Referees: Marko Vučković (SLO), Abigail Catrix (FRA), Milan Španič (SLO)

21 November 2018	**Italy**	**62**–56	Sweden	La Spezia
20:30 (UTC+1)	Scoring by quarter: **19**–15, **21**–6, 10–**20**, 12–**15**
	Pts: Andrè 20; Rebs: Andrè 9 Asts: F. Dotto, Zandalasini 3	Boxscore	Pts: F. Eldebrink 19; Rebs: Zahui 9 Asts: E. Eldebrink 8	Arena: Palazzo dello Sport Gianfranco Mariotti; Referees: Jasmina Juras (SRB), Esperanza Mendoza Holgado (ESP), Andrada Csender (ROU)

=== Ranking of second-placed teams ===
The six best second-placed teams from the groups qualified for the final tournament.

Pos	Grp	Team	Pld	W	L	PF	PA	PD	Pts	Qualification
1	G	Belgium	6	5	1	477	348	+129	11	Final tournament
2	B	Belarus	6	5	1	448	358	+90	11	Final tournament
3	E	Slovenia	6	5	1	455	404	+51	11	Final tournament
4	C	Hungary	6	4	2	544	348	+196	10	Final tournament
5	F	Ukraine	6	4	2	475	367	+108	10	Final tournament
6	H	Sweden	6	4	2	432	339	+93	10	Final tournament
7	D	Greece	6	4	2	431	379	+52	10	
8	A	Bosnia and Herzegovina	6	4	2	493	452	+41	10	

Source: FIBA
Rules for classification: 1) Points; 2) Points difference; 3) Points scored.
