= EuroBasket Women 2019 squads =

This article displays the rosters for the teams competing at the EuroBasket Women 2019. Each team had to submit 12 players.

== Group A ==
=== Great Britain ===
A 17-player squad was announced on 18 May 2019. The final squad was revealed on 19 June 2019.

Great Britain women's national basketball team roster
Players
Coaches

Pos.	No.	Name	Age – Date of birth	Height	Club	Ctr.
G	4	Georgia Jones	29 – 3 April 1990	1.72 m (5 ft 8 in)	Manchester Mystics	(United Kingdom)
PG	6	Stef Collins	36 – 30 December 1982	1.68 m (5 ft 6 in)	Rhondda Rebels	(United Kingdom)
G	7	Rachael Vanderwal	36 – 27 June 1983	1.76 m (5 ft 9 in)	Gernika KESB	(Spain)
SF	8	Chantelle Handy	32 – 16 June 1987	1.88 m (6 ft 2 in)	Arka Gdynia	(Poland)
C	9	Hannah Shaw	28 – 22 September 1990	1.92 m (6 ft 4 in)	AD Cortegada	(Spain)
F	11	Mollie Campbell	24 – 28 February 1995	1.83 m (6 ft 0 in)	Leicester Riders	(United Kingdom)
SG	13	Johannah Leedham	31 – 5 December 1987	1.76 m (5 ft 9 in)	CCC Polkowice	(Poland)
F	14	Janice Monakana	23 – 6 August 1995	1.82 m (6 ft 0 in)	Sevenoaks Suns	(United Kingdom)
C	15	Temi Fagbenle	26 – 8 September 1992	1.93 m (6 ft 4 in)	CCC Polkowice	(Poland)
F	25	Cheridene Green	23 – 19 September 1995	1.91 m (6 ft 3 in)	Tennessee Lady Volunteers	(United States)
G	41	Eilidh Simpson	26 – 11 September 1992	1.70 m (5 ft 7 in)	CSL Dijon	(France)
SG	44	Karlie Samuelson	24 – 10 May 1995	1.83 m (6 ft 0 in)	BC Castors Braine	(Belgium)

Head coach

- (Spain) José Buceta

Assistant coaches

- (United Kingdom) Vanessa Ellis
- (Spain) Susana García

Legend

- Club – describes last
  club before the tournament
- Age – describes age
  on 27 June 2019

=== Latvia ===
A 16-player squad was announced on 16 May 2019. The final squad was revealed on 22 June 2019.

Latvia women's national basketball team roster
Players
Coaches

Pos.	No.	Name	Age – Date of birth	Height	Club	Ctr.
SF	4	Paula Strautmane	22 – 23 March 1997	1.85 m (6 ft 1 in)	Quinnipiac Bobcats	(United States)
G	6	Laura Ikstena	29 – 27 May 1990	1.76 m (5 ft 9 in)	MKK Siedlce	(Poland)
PG	7	Elīna Dikaioulaku	30 – 24 April 1989	1.72 m (5 ft 8 in)	Ślęza Wrocław	(Poland)
PF	10	Karlīne Pilābere	28 – 16 November 1990	1.86 m (6 ft 1 in)	TTT Riga	(Latvia)
C	13	Aija Brumermane	32 – 17 October 1986	1.92 m (6 ft 4 in)	TTT Riga	(Latvia)
F	14	Luīze Šepte	19 – 8 October 1999	1.80 m (5 ft 11 in)	South Florida Bulls	(United States)
SG	15	Ieva Pulvere	28 – 22 July 1990	1.72 m (5 ft 8 in)	TTT Riga	(Latvia)
PG	16	Ilze Jākobsone	25 – 19 April 1994	1.68 m (5 ft 6 in)	USC Freiburg	(Germany)
C	22	Zenta Meļņika	27 – 6 September 1991	1.96 m (6 ft 5 in)	Lupe San Martino	(Italy)
PF	28	Kristīne Vītola	28 – 2 June 1991	1.96 m (6 ft 5 in)	TTT Riga	(Latvia)
SF	35	Kate Krēsliņa	23 – 14 April 1996	1.84 m (6 ft 0 in)	TTT Riga	(Latvia)
PF	45	Digna Strautmane	20 – 18 September 1998	1.88 m (6 ft 2 in)	Syracuse Orange	(United States)

Head coach

- (Latvia) Mārtiņš Zībarts

Assistant coach(es)

- (Latvia) Ziedonis Jansons
- (Latvia) Aigars Nerips
- (Latvia) Matīss Rožlapa

Legend

- Club – describes last
  club before the tournament
- Age – describes age
  on 27 June 2019

=== Spain ===
The squad was announced on 17 June 2019.

Spain women's national basketball team roster
Players
Coaches

Pos.	No.	Name	Age – Date of birth	Height	Club	Ctr.
F	3	Andrea Vilaró	26 – 9 May 1993	1.79 m (5 ft 10 in)	Cadí La Seu	(Spain)
PF	4	Laura Nicholls	30 – 26 February 1989	1.90 m (6 ft 3 in)	Nadezhda Orenburg	(Russia)
PG	5	Cristina Ouviña	28 – 18 September 1990	1.73 m (5 ft 8 in)	Tango Bourges Basket	(France)
G	6	Sílvia Domínguez	32 – 31 January 1987	1.65 m (5 ft 5 in)	Perfumerías Avenida	(Spain)
PG	9	Laia Palau	39 – 10 September 1979	1.78 m (5 ft 10 in)	Spar CityLift Girona	(Spain)
PG	10	Marta Xargay	28 – 20 December 1990	1.80 m (5 ft 11 in)	Dynamo Kursk	(Russia)
PF	13	Tamara Abalde	30 – 9 February 1989	1.92 m (6 ft 4 in)	Valencia Basket	(Spain)
PG	15	Anna Cruz	32 – 27 October 1986	1.72 m (5 ft 8 in)	Dynamo Kursk	(Russia)
F	17	María Pina	31 – 8 August 1987	1.89 m (6 ft 2 in)	Valencia Basket	(Spain)
SF	18	Queralt Casas	26 – 18 November 1992	1.80 m (5 ft 11 in)	Sopron Basket	(Hungary)
C	24	Laura Gil	27 – 24 April 1992	1.90 m (6 ft 3 in)	Perfumerías Avenida	(Spain)
C	45	Astou Ndour	24 – 23 August 1994	1.98 m (6 ft 6 in)	Chicago Sky	(United States)

Head coach

- (Spain) Lucas Mondelo

Assistant coach(es)

- (Spain) César Rupérez
- (Spain) Madelén Urieta
- (Spain) Isaac Fernández

Legend

- Club – describes last
  club before the tournament
- Age – describes age
  on 27 June 2019

=== Ukraine ===
A 19-player squad was announced on 5 May 2019. The final squad was revealed on 24 June 2019.

Ukraine women's national basketball team roster
Players
Coaches

Pos.	No.	Name	Age – Date of birth	Height	Club	Ctr.
SF	5	Viktoriya Kondus	22 – 11 March 1997	1.80 m (5 ft 11 in)	Kyiv-Basket	(Ukraine)
SG	7	Vladyslava Voloshyna	1,819 – 6 March 200	1.80 m (5 ft 11 in)
SG	8	Vita Horobets	23 – 6 April 1996	1.80 m (5 ft 11 in)	BC Namur-Capitale	(Belgium)
SF	9	Alexandra Radulović	33 – 4 April 1986	1.85 m (6 ft 1 in)
PF	11	Miriam Uro-Nile	24 – 21 October 1994	1.89 m (6 ft 2 in)	Energa Toruń	(Poland)
F	12	Olga Yatskovets	21 – 16 October 1997	1.89 m (6 ft 2 in)	MBK Ružomberok	(Slovakia)
PF	13	Olesia Malashenko	28 – 21 February 1991	1.89 m (6 ft 2 in)	BC Castors Braine	(Belgium)
PF	19	Taisiia Udodenko	30 – 7 May 1989	1.90 m (6 ft 3 in)	Ślęza Wrocław	(Poland)
SF	23	Alina Iagupova	27 – 9 February 1992	1.86 m (6 ft 1 in)	Çukurova Basketbol	(Turkey)
F	31	Anna Olkhovyk	32 – 18 June 1987	1.86 m (6 ft 1 in)
SF	32	Liudmyla Naumenko	25 – 30 June 1993	1.88 m (6 ft 2 in)	Çukurova Basketbol	(Turkey)
PG	88	Arina Bilotserkivska	29 – 3 December 1989	1.70 m (5 ft 7 in)	Ostrów Wielkopolski	(Poland)

Head coach

- (Montenegro) Goran Bošković

Assistant coach(es)

- (Ukraine) Inna Kochubei

Legend

- Club – describes last
  club before the tournament
- Age – describes age
  on 27 June 2019

== Group B ==
=== Czech Republic ===
A 17-player squad was announced on 6 May 2019. The final squad was revealed on 19 June 2019.

Czech Republic women's national basketball team roster
Players
Coaches

Pos.	No.	Name	Age – Date of birth	Height	Club	Ctr.
SG	0	Renáta Březinová	29 – 6 January 1990	1.85 m (6 ft 1 in)	Energa Toruń	(Poland)
C	3	Kamila Štěpánová	30 – 3 December 1988	1.92 m (6 ft 4 in)	Bretagne Basket	(France)
SG	5	Romana Hejdová	31 – 9 May 1988	1.80 m (5 ft 11 in)	Basket Landes	(France)
SF	6	Karolína Elhotová	27 – 7 January 1992	1.82 m (6 ft 0 in)	USK Praha	(Czech Republic)
SG	8	Veronika Voráčková	20 – 21 June 1999	1.80 m (5 ft 11 in)	USK Praha	(Czech Republic)
PG	9	Lenka Bartáková	28 – 17 May 1991	1.75 m (5 ft 9 in)	KP Brno	(Czech Republic)
SF	10	Beáta Adamcová	26 – 13 January 1993	1.80 m (5 ft 11 in)	Žabiny Brno	(Czech Republic)
SF	11	Kateřina Elhotová	29 – 14 October 1989	1.80 m (5 ft 11 in)	USK Praha	(Czech Republic)
PG	12	Tereza Vyoralová	25 – 16 January 1994	1.76 m (5 ft 9 in)	USK Praha	(Czech Republic)
PF	14	Tereza Krakovičová	31 – 10 July 1987	1.90 m (6 ft 3 in)	Basketball Nymburk	(Czech Republic)
SG	15	Renata Pudláková	27 – 18 March 1992	1.77 m (5 ft 10 in)	Rutronik Stars Keltern	(Germany)
PF	18	Klára Vojtíková	25 – 16 June 1994	1.90 m (6 ft 3 in)	BC Hradec Králové	(Czech Republic)

Head coach

- (Czech Republic) Ivan Beneš

Assistant coach(es)

- (Czech Republic) Veronika Bortelová
- (Slovakia) Štefan Svitek

Legend

- Club – describes last
  club before the tournament
- Age – describes age
  on 27 June 2019

=== France ===
The squad was announced on 16 June 2019.

France women's national basketball team roster
Players
Coaches

Pos.	No.	Name	Age – Date of birth	Height	Club	Ctr.
PG	0	Olivia Époupa	25 – 30 April 1994	1.64 m (5 ft 5 in)	Beşiktaş	(Turkey)
SG	3	Ornella Bankole	21 – 17 September 1997	1.81 m (5 ft 11 in)	Basket Lattes	(France)
PG	4	Marine Fauthoux	18 – 23 January 2001	1.76 m (5 ft 9 in)	Tarbes GB	(France)
PF	5	Endéné Miyem	31 – 15 May 1988	1.88 m (6 ft 2 in)	Basket Lattes	(France)
PF	6	Alexia Chartereau	20 – 5 September 1998	1.90 m (6 ft 3 in)	Bourges	(France)
C	7	Sandrine Gruda	32 – 25 June 1987	1.93 m (6 ft 4 in)	PF Schio	(Italy)
SF	11	Valériane Ayayi	25 – 29 April 1994	1.84 m (6 ft 0 in)	USK Praha	(Czech Republic)
C	12	Iliana Rupert	17 – 12 July 2001	1.94 m (6 ft 4 in)	Bourges	(France)
SG	14	Bria Hartley	26 – 30 September 1992	1.76 m (5 ft 9 in)	Fenerbahçe	(Turkey)
SG	17	Marine Johannès	24 – 21 January 1995	1.77 m (5 ft 10 in)	Bourges	(France)
C	21	Marième Badiane	24 – 24 November 1994	1.90 m (6 ft 3 in)	ASVEL	(France)
G	88	Sara Chevaugeon	26 – 12 February 1993	1.77 m (5 ft 10 in)	Flammes Carolo	(France)

Head coach

- (France) Valérie Garnier

Assistant coach(es)

- (France) Grégory Halin
- (France) Olivier Lafargue
- (France) Rachid Meziane

Legend

- Club – describes last
  club before the tournament
- Age – describes age
  on 27 June 2019

=== Montenegro ===
A 21-player squad was announced on 3 May 2019. The final squad was revealed on 24 June 2019.

Montenegro women's national basketball team roster
Players
Coaches

Pos.	No.	Name	Age – Date of birth	Height	Club	Ctr.
F	5	Jovana Pašić	27 – 12 May 1992	1.83 m (6 ft 0 in)	ACS Sepsi SIC	(Romania)
SG	6	Jelena Vučetić	25 – 14 September 1993	1.82 m (6 ft 0 in)	ŽKK Budućnost Podgorica	(Montenegro)
C	7	Nataša Popović	37 – 14 April 1982	1.90 m (6 ft 3 in)	SIG Basket	(France)
SG	8	Dragana Živković	18 – 23 January 2001	1.79 m (5 ft 10 in)	ŽKK Budućnost Podgorica	(Montenegro)
PG	9	Snežana Aleksić	30 – 14 January 1989	1.73 m (5 ft 8 in)	BC Beroe	(Bulgaria)
PG	11	Božica Mujović	23 – 7 January 1996	1.76 m (5 ft 9 in)	CB Al-Qázeres	(Spain)
G	12	Milena Jakšić	20 – 27 December 1998	1.83 m (6 ft 0 in)	ŽKK Budućnost Podgorica	(Montenegro)
PF	13	Bojana Kovačević	22 – 16 October 1996	1.86 m (6 ft 1 in)	CBF Sant Adrià	(Spain)
F	14	Milica Jovanović	29 – 14 August 1989	1.89 m (6 ft 2 in)	CBF Sant Adrià	(Spain)
C	19	Violeta Lazarević	22 – 13 June 1997	1.90 m (6 ft 3 in)	ŽKK Budućnost Podgorica	(Montenegro)
PF	23	Irena Matović	31 – 23 May 1988	1.84 m (6 ft 0 in)	CDB Clarinos	(Spain)
F	25	Glory Johnson	28 – 27 July 1990	1.91 m (6 ft 3 in)	Hatay BB	(Turkey)

Head coach

- (Montenegro) Jelena Škerović

Assistant coach(es)

- (Montenegro) Rajko Krivokapić
- (Montenegro) Boško Radović

Legend

- Club – describes last
  club before the tournament
- Age – describes age
  on 27 June 2019

=== Sweden ===
The squad was announced on 16 June 2019.

Sweden women's national basketball team roster
Players
Coaches

Pos.	No.	Name	Age – Date of birth	Height	Club	Ctr.
PF	1	Farhiya Abdi	27 – 31 May 1992	1.88 m (6 ft 2 in)	Galatasaray	(Turkey)
F	5	Kalis Loyd	30 – 5 April 1989	1.84 m (6 ft 0 in)	Flammes Carolo	(France)
SG	6	Frida Eldebrink	31 – 4 January 1988	1.75 m (5 ft 9 in)	KSC Szekszárd	(Hungary)
PG	7	Klara Lundquist	19 – 28 August 1999	1.73 m (5 ft 8 in)	Telge Basket	(Sweden)
F	8	Ellen Nyström	25 – 15 September 1993	1.85 m (6 ft 1 in)	IDK Gipuzkoa	(Spain)
G	9	Elin Eldebrink	31 – 4 January 1988	1.70 m (5 ft 7 in)	CB Avenida	(Spain)
C	10	Danielle Hamilton-Carter	29 – 23 January 1990	1.91 m (6 ft 3 in)	Ceglédi EKK	(Hungary)
PF	11	Regan Magarity	23 – 30 April 1996	1.90 m (6 ft 3 in)	Hatay BB	(Turkey)
G	13	Binta Drammeh	27 – 21 May 1992	1.81 m (5 ft 11 in)	Le Mura Lucca	(Italy)
C	14	Louice Halvarsson	30 – 15 January 1989	1.91 m (6 ft 3 in)	Wetterbygden Sparks	(Sweden)
C	15	Josefin Vesterberg	25 – 2 November 1993	1.90 m (6 ft 3 in)	Umeå BBK	(Sweden)
PF	17	Amanda Zahui B.	25 – 8 September 1993	1.96 m (6 ft 5 in)	New York Liberty	(United States)

Head coach

- (France) François Gomez

Assistant coaches

- (Italy) Francisco Pinto
- (Sweden) Jesper Sundberg

Legend

- Club – describes last
  club before the tournament
- Age – describes age
  on 27 June 2019

== Group C ==
=== Hungary ===
A 18-player squad was announced on 25 April 2019. The final squad was revealed on 23 June 2019.

Hungary women's national basketball team roster
Players
Coaches

Pos.	No.	Name	Age – Date of birth	Height	Club
SG	1	Petra Pusztai	20 – 27 April 1999	1.77 m (5 ft 10 in)	Diósgyőri VTK	(Hungary)
C	2	Virág Kiss	21 – 12 April 1998	1.94 m (6 ft 4 in)	KSC Szekszárd	(Hungary)
SF	4	Debora Dubei	22 – 4 January 1997	1.82 m (6 ft 0 in)	Uniqa Sopron	(Hungary)
SF	5	Krisztina Raksányi	27 – 26 September 1991	1.80 m (5 ft 11 in)	UNI Győr	(Hungary)
G	9	Ágnes Studer	20 – 10 September 1998	1.68 m (5 ft 6 in)	KSC Szekszárd	(Hungary)
SF	10	Zsófia Varga	30 – 15 January 1989	1.82 m (6 ft 0 in)	UNI Győr	(Hungary)
C	11	Dóra Horti	32 – 25 April 1987	1.95 m (6 ft 5 in)	ZTE Kosárlabda	(Hungary)
SG	18	Réka Lelik	20 – 14 April 1999	1.79 m (5 ft 10 in)	NKE-Csata	(Hungary)
PG	22	Yvonne Turner	31 – 13 October 1987	1.78 m (5 ft 10 in)	Uniqa Sopron	(Hungary)
PG	23	Bernadett Horváth	22 – 27 August 1996	1.70 m (5 ft 7 in)	NKE-Csata	(Hungary)
C	44	Bernadett Határ	24 – 24 August 1994	2.08 m (6 ft 10 in)	Uniqa Sopron	(Hungary)
PF	51	Dorina Zele	27 – 13 February 1992	1.85 m (6 ft 1 in)	Diósgyőri VTK	(Hungary)

Head coach

- (Hungary) Norbert Székely

Assistant coach(es)

- (Hungary) László Cziczás
- (Hungary) Dalma Iványi
- (Hungary) Andrea Mészárosné

Legend

- Club – describes last
  club before the tournament
- Age – describes age
  on 27 June 2019

=== Italy ===
A 17-player squad was announced on 15 May 2019. The final squad was revealed on 24 June 2019.

Italy women's national basketball team roster
Players
Coaches

Pos.	No.	Name	Age – Date of birth	Height	Club	Ctr.
PG	0	Caterina Dotto	26 – 17 March 1993	1.70 m (5 ft 7 in)	GS San Martino	(Italy)
PG	3	Nicole Romeo	29 – 29 August 1989	1.66 m (5 ft 5 in)	Virtus Eirene Ragusa	(Italy)
G	7	Giorgia Sottana	30 – 15 December 1988	1.75 m (5 ft 9 in)	Fenerbahçe	(Turkey)
SF	9	Cecilia Zandalasini	23 – 16 March 1996	1.85 m (6 ft 1 in)	Fenerbahçe	(Turkey)
PG	10	Francesca Dotto	26 – 17 March 1993	1.69 m (5 ft 7 in)	PF Schio	(Italy)
SF	13	Valeria De Pretto	27 – 16 November 1991	1.85 m (6 ft 1 in)	Reyer Venezia	(Italy)
G	14	Martina Crippa	30 – 31 March 1989	1.78 m (5 ft 10 in)	PF Schio	(Italy)
C	19	Lorela Cubaj	20 – 8 January 1999	1.93 m (6 ft 4 in)	Georgia Tech Yellow Jackets	(United States)
C	20	Elisa Ercoli	23 – 26 December 1995	1.90 m (6 ft 3 in)	Geas Basket	(Italy)
PG	23	Sabrina Cinili	30 – 22 April 1989	1.91 m (6 ft 3 in)	Virtus Eirene Ragusa	(Italy)
C	33	Olbis Futo Andrè	20 – 25 December 1998	1.92 m (6 ft 4 in)	PF Schio	(Italy)
C	41	Elisa Penna	23 – 13 November 1995	1.91 m (6 ft 3 in)	Wake Forest Demon Deacons	(United States)

Head coach

- (Italy) Marco Crespi

Assistant coach(es)

- (Italy) Nazareno Lombardi
- (Italy) Alessandro Magro
- (Italy) Gianluca Quarta

Legend

- Club – describes last
  club before the tournament
- Age – describes age
  on 27 June 2019

=== Slovenia ===
The squad was announced on 17 June 2019.

Slovenia women's national basketball team roster
Players
Coaches

Pos.	No.	Name	Age – Date of birth	Height	Club	Ctr.
PG	2	Aleksandra Krošelj	20 – 25 February 1999	1.72 m (5 ft 8 in)	ŽKK Celje	(Slovenia)
SG	3	Teja Oblak	28 – 20 December 1990	1.72 m (5 ft 8 in)	USK Praha	(Czech Republic)
G	6	Annamaria Prezelj	21 – 30 July 1997	1.75 m (5 ft 9 in)	Gorzów Wielkopolski	(Poland)
PF	7	Maruša Seničar	22 – 5 May 1997	1.87 m (6 ft 2 in)	ŽKK Celje	(Slovenia)
C	8	Teja Goršič	19 – 7 July 1999	1.89 m (6 ft 2 in)	BAM Propad	(Slovakia)
PG	9	Nika Barič	26 – 2 September 1992	1.69 m (5 ft 7 in)	UMMC Ekaterinburg	(Russia)
F	10	Tina Jakovina	26 – 11 August 1992	1.82 m (6 ft 0 in)	TSV 1880 Wasserburg	(Germany)
SG	11	Eva Rupnik	26 – 18 October 1992	1.76 m (5 ft 9 in)	Eintracht Braunschweig	(Germany)
C	12	Eva Lisec	24 – 17 June 1995	1.92 m (6 ft 4 in)	PF Schio	(Italy)
PG	13	Zala Friškovec	19 – 10 October 1999	1.80 m (5 ft 11 in)	ŽKK Celje	(Slovenia)
C	30	Shante Evans	27 – 8 July 1991	1.85 m (6 ft 1 in)	Artego Bydgoszcz	(Poland)
PF	88	Merisa Dautović	19 – 22 December 1999	1.86 m (6 ft 1 in)	ŽKD Maribor	(Slovenia)

Head coach

- (Slovenia) Damir Grgić

Assistant coach(es)

- (Slovenia) Slavko Duščak
- (Slovenia) Jure Krajnc
- (Slovenia) Predrag Radović

Legend

- Club – describes last
  club before the tournament
- Age – describes age
  on 27 June 2019

=== Turkey ===
A 21-player squad was announced on 9 May 2019. The final squad was revealed on 25 June 2019.

Turkey women's national basketball team roster
Players
Coaches

Pos.	No.	Name	Age – Date of birth	Height	Club
PG	0	Asena Yalçın	28 – 4 April 1991	1.66 m (5 ft 5 in)	Mersin BSB	(Turkey)
PG	1	Pelin Bilgiç	24 – 15 July 1994	1.73 m (5 ft 8 in)	Çukurova Basketbol	(Turkey)
SG	3	Ayşe Cora	26 – 3 March 1993	1.75 m (5 ft 9 in)	Fenerbahçe	(Turkey)
PG	4	Olcay Çakır	25 – 13 July 1993	1.82 m (6 ft 0 in)	Botaş SK	(Turkey)
SF	7	Cansu Köksal	25 – 28 April 1994	1.87 m (6 ft 2 in)	Hatay BB	(Turkey)
SF	9	Bahar Çağlar	30 – 28 September 1988	1.90 m (6 ft 3 in)	Beşiktaş	(Turkey)
PG	10	Işıl Alben	33 – 22 February 1986	1.72 m (5 ft 8 in)	Galatasaray	(Turkey)
PF	12	Tuğçe Canıtez	28 – 10 November 1990	1.88 m (6 ft 2 in)	Fenerbahçe	(Turkey)
PF	15	Tilbe Şenyürek	24 – 26 April 1995	1.89 m (6 ft 2 in)	Fenerbahçe	(Turkey)
C	24	İnci Güçlü	20 – 26 February 1999	2.05 m (6 ft 9 in)	Galatasaray	(Turkey)
C	33	Esra Ural Topuz	27 – 18 August 1991	1.98 m (6 ft 6 in)	Fenerbahçe	(Turkey)
C	41	Kiah Stokes	26 – 30 March 1993	1.90 m (6 ft 3 in)	Fenerbahçe	(Turkey)

Head coach

- (Turkey) Osman Orak

Assistant coach(es)

- (Turkey) Esmeral Tunçluer
- (Turkey) Ceyhun Yıldızoğlu

Legend

- Club – describes last
  club before the tournament
- Age – describes age
  on 27 June 2019

== Group D ==
=== Belarus ===
A 16-player squad was announced on 11 May 2019.

Belarus women's national basketball team roster
Players
Coaches

Pos.	No.	Name	Age – Date of birth	Height	Club	Ctr.
PG	5	Aliaksandra Tarasava	31 – 23 June 1988	1.72 m (5 ft 8 in)	TKH Basketball	(Germany)
F	6	Katsiaryna Snytsina	33 – 2 September 1985	1.88 m (6 ft 2 in)	Hatay BB	(Turkey)
SF	7	Yuliya Rytsikava	32 – 8 September 1986	1.80 m (5 ft 11 in)	Gorzów Wielkopolski	(Belarus)
SG	8	Tatsiana Likhtarovich	31 – 29 March 1988	1.80 m (5 ft 11 in)	Sokol Králové	(Czech Republic)
PG	9	Volha Ziuzkova	36 – 14 June 1983	1.71 m (5 ft 7 in)	Horizont Minsk	(Belarus)
PF	10	Anastasiya Verameyenka	31 – 10 July 1987	1.92 m (6 ft 4 in)	Fenerbahçe	(Turkey)
SF	12	Aryna Masko	20 – 1 February 1999	1.78 m (5 ft 10 in)	Olimpia Grodno	(Belarus)
PF	13	Maryia Papova	25 – 13 June 1994	1.88 m (6 ft 2 in)	Arka Gdynia	(Poland)
PF	18	Hanna Brych	22 – 8 March 1997	1.86 m (6 ft 1 in)	Dynamo Moscow	(Russia)
PG	20	Alex Bentley	28 – 27 October 1990	1.73 m (5 ft 8 in)	Elitzur Holon	(Israel)
C	21	Viktoryia Hasper	31 – 9 January 1988	1.92 m (6 ft 4 in)	BC Tsmoki-Minsk	(Belarus)
SF	23	Yanina Inkina	21 – 16 October 1997	1.86 m (6 ft 1 in)	Little Rock Trojans	(United States)

Head coach

- (Belarus) Nataliya Trafimava

Assistant coach(es)

- (Belarus) Aliaksei Pyntsikau

Legend

- Club – describes last
  club before the tournament
- Age – describes age
  on 27 June 2019

=== Belgium ===
The squad was announced on 17 June 2019.

Belgium women's national basketball team roster
Players
Coaches

Pos.	No.	Name	Age – Date of birth	Height	Club	Ctr.
SG	5	Kim Mestdagh	29 – 12 March 1990	1.79 m (5 ft 10 in)	Çukurova Basketbol	(Turkey)
SF	6	Antonia Delaere	24 – 1 August 1994	1.80 m (5 ft 11 in)	Castors Braine	(Belgium)
G	9	Marjorie Carpréaux	31 – 17 September 1987	1.61 m (5 ft 3 in)	Mechelen	(Belgium)
PF	11	Emma Meesseman	26 – 13 May 1993	1.92 m (6 ft 4 in)	UMMC Ekaterinburg	(Russia)
C	12	Ann Wauters	38 – 12 October 1980	1.95 m (6 ft 5 in)
C	13	Kyara Linskens	22 – 13 November 1996	1.93 m (6 ft 4 in)	Gorzów Wielkopolski	(Poland)
F	22	Hanne Mestdagh	26 – 19 April 1993	1.78 m (5 ft 10 in)	Namur-Capitale	(Belgium)
C	23	Serena-Lynn Geldof	22 – 2 March 1997	1.96 m (6 ft 5 in)	Namur-Capitale	(Belgium)
F	32	Heleen Nauwelaers	23 – 14 March 1996	1.80 m (5 ft 11 in)	CB Bembibre	(Spain)
PG	35	Julie Vanloo	26 – 10 February 1993	1.68 m (5 ft 6 in)	PEAC-Pécs	(Hungary)
PF	42	Jana Raman	28 – 15 February 1991	1.87 m (6 ft 2 in)	CB Benimaclet	(Spain)
PG	55	Julie Allemand	22 – 7 July 1996	1.68 m (5 ft 6 in)	ASVEL	(France)

Head coach

- (Belgium) Philip Mestdagh

Assistant coach(es)

- (Belgium) Sven Van Camp
- (Belgium) Pierre Cornia
- (Belgium) Sébastien Dufour

Legend

- Club – describes last
  club before the tournament
- Age – describes age
  on 27 June 2019

=== Russia ===
The final squad was announced on 24 June 2019.

Russia women's national basketball team roster
Players
Coaches

Pos.	No.	Name	Age – Date of birth	Height	Club	Ctr.
SF	4	Raisa Musina	21 – 31 March 1998	1.92 m (6 ft 4 in)	UMMC Ekaterinburg	(Russia)
SF	5	Evgeniya Belyakova	33 – 27 June 1986	1.82 m (6 ft 0 in)	UMMC Ekaterinburg	(Russia)
C	7	Maria Vadeeva	20 – 16 July 1998	1.90 m (6 ft 3 in)	UMMC Ekaterinburg	(Russia)
PG	8	Ekaterina Fedorenkova	25 – 12 August 1993	1.77 m (5 ft 10 in)	Nadezhda Orenburg	(Russia)
SF	10	Anastasia Shilova	28 – 10 January 1991	1.86 m (6 ft 1 in)	Nadezhda Orenburg	(Russia)
PF	11	Anastasia Logunova	28 – 20 July 1990	1.92 m (6 ft 4 in)	MBA Moscow	(Russia)
C	15	Natalia Vieru	29 – 25 July 1989	1.96 m (6 ft 5 in)	UMMC Ekaterinburg	(Russia)
PG	17	Elena Beglova	31 – 1 September 1987	1.76 m (5 ft 9 in)	UMMC Ekaterinburg	(Russia)
SG	18	Anna Leshkovtseva	32 – 27 April 1987	1.81 m (5 ft 11 in)	MBA Moscow	(Russia)
SF	23	Iuliia Gladkova	25 – 17 January 1994	1.82 m (6 ft 0 in)	CB Bembibre	(Spain)
PF	32	Zhosselina Maiga	23 – 30 April 1996	1.93 m (6 ft 4 in)	Nadezhda Orenburg	(Russia)
PG	99	Kseniia Levchenko	23 – 29 March 1996	1.65 m (5 ft 5 in)	WBC Enisey	(Russia)

Head coach

- (Germany) Olaf Lange

Assistant coach(es)

- (Serbia) Vladan Čubrić
- (Russia) Dmitry Shumikhin

Legend

- Club – describes last
  club before the tournament
- Age – describes age
  on 27 June 2019

=== Serbia ===
A 19-player squad was announced on 15 May 2019.

Serbia women's national basketball team roster
Players
Coaches

Pos.	No.	Name	Age – Date of birth	Height	Club	Ctr.
PG	3	Maja Miljković	31 – 11 April 1988	1.75 m (5 ft 9 in)	BC Castors Braine	(Belgium)
SF	5	Sonja Petrović	30 – 18 February 1989	1.89 m (6 ft 2 in)	Dynamo Kursk	(Russia)
SG	6	Saša Čađo	29 – 13 July 1989	1.78 m (5 ft 10 in)	Mersin BSB	(Turkey)
SG	8	Nevena Jovanović	28 – 30 June 1990	1.79 m (5 ft 10 in)	Budapest	(Hungary)
PF	9	Jelena Brooks	30 – 28 April 1989	1.90 m (6 ft 3 in)	Uniqa Sopron	(Hungary)
G	10	Dajana Butulija	33 – 23 February 1986	1.75 m (5 ft 9 in)	Lublin	(Poland)
PF	11	Aleksandra Crvendakić	23 – 17 March 1996	1.87 m (6 ft 2 in)	Uniqa Sopron	(Hungary)
C	13	Nikolina Milić	25 – 12 April 1994	1.89 m (6 ft 2 in)	Gernika	(Spain)
C	14	Dragana Stanković	24 – 18 January 1995	1.95 m (6 ft 5 in)	Bydgoszcz	(Poland)
PG	20	Aleksandra Stanaćev	24 – 25 September 1994	1.61 m (5 ft 3 in)	CD Zamarat	(Spain)
SG	23	Ana Dabović	29 – 18 August 1989	1.83 m (6 ft 0 in)	Tango Bourges Basket	(France)
PF	24	Maja Škorić	29 – 11 October 1989	1.84 m (6 ft 0 in)	Miskolc	(Hungary)

Head coach

- (Serbia) Marina Maljković

Assistant coach(es)

- (Serbia) Miloš Pađen
- (Serbia) Vladimir Vuksanović

Legend

- Club – describes last
  club before the tournament
- Age – describes age
  on 27 June 2019
