= EuroBasket Women 2015 squads =

This article displays the rosters for the teams competing at the EuroBasket Women 2015. Each team has to submit 12 players.

== Group A ==
=== Czech Republic ===
Czech Republic women's national basketball team – EuroBasket Women 2015 roster
Players
Coaches

Pos.	No.	Name	Age – Date of birth	Height	Club
PG	0	Veronika Bortelová	37 – 11 June 1978	1.69 m (5 ft 7 in)	Basketball Nymburk	(Czech Republic)
F	4	Jana Veselá	31 – 31 December 1983	1.94 m (6 ft 4 in)	ZVVZ USK Prague	(Czech Republic)
F	5	Michaela Stejskalová	28 – 4 April 1987	1.86 m (6 ft 1 in)	BK Brno	(Czech Republic)
G	6	Romana Hejdová	27 – 9 May 1988	1.84 m (6 ft 0 in)	Angers BC	(France)
F	7	Alena Hanušová	24 – 29 May 1991	1.90 m (6 ft 3 in)	ZVVZ USK Prague	(Czech Republic)
C	8	Ilona Burgrová	31 – 15 March 1984	1.96 m (6 ft 5 in)	ZVVZ USK Prague	(Czech Republic)
G	9	Kateřina Bartoňová	25 – 17 January 1990	1.73 m (5 ft 8 in)	Piešťanské Čajky	(Slovakia)
G	11	Kateřina Elhotová	25 – 14 October 1989	1.81 m (5 ft 11 in)	ZVVZ USK Prague	(Czech Republic)
F	12	Tereza Vyoralová	21 – 16 January 1994	1.78 m (5 ft 10 in)	VŠ Prague	(Czech Republic)
PF	17	Kamila Stepanova	26 – 3 December 1988	1.93 m (6 ft 4 in)	Basket Landes	(France)
F	18	Tereza Pecková	27 – 10 July 1987	1.89 m (6 ft 2 in)	BK Brno	(Czech Republic)
SG	24	Katerina Hindrakova	27 – 9 February 1988	1.78 m (5 ft 10 in)	BK Brno	(Czech Republic)

Head coach

- Lubor Blažek

Assistant coach(es)

- Ivan Beneš
- Aleš Kaplan

Legend

- Club – describes last
  club before the tournament
- Age – describes age
  on 11 June 2015

=== France ===
France women's national basketball team – EuroBasket Women 2015 roster
Players
Coaches

Pos.	No.	Name	Age – Date of birth	Height	Club
C	4	Isabelle Yacoubou	29 – 21 April 1986	1.90 m (6 ft 3 in)	Beretta Famila Schio	(Italy)
F	5	Endéné Miyem	27 – 15 May 1988	1.88 m (6 ft 2 in)	Bourges Basket	(France)
SF	6	Diandra Tchatchouang	23 – 14 June 1991	1.86 m (6 ft 1 in)	Bourges Basket	(France)
C	7	Sandrine Gruda	27 – 25 June 1987	1.93 m (6 ft 4 in)	UMMC Ekaterinburg	(Russia)
PG	8	Olivia Époupa	21 – 30 April 1994	1.64 m (5 ft 5 in)	Toulouse Métropole Basket	(France)
PG	9	Céline Dumerc (C)	32 – 9 July 1982	1.68 m (5 ft 6 in)	Bourges Basket	(France)
SG	10	Sarah Michel	26 – 10 January 1989	1.80 m (5 ft 11 in)	Rezé-Nantes Basket	(France)
C	11	Ana Cata-Chitiga	25 – 20 June 1989	1.95 m (6 ft 5 in)	Flammes Carolo Basket	(France)
SG	12	Gaëlle Skrela	32 – 24 January 1983	1.77 m (5 ft 10 in)	BLMA	(France)
C	13	Héléna Ciak	25 – 15 December 1989	1.97 m (6 ft 6 in)	Bourges Basket	(France)
SG	14	Paoline Salagnac	31 – 13 March 1984	1.76 m (5 ft 9 in)	Bourges Basket	(France)
PG	15	Anaël Lardy	27 – 24 October 1987	1.70 m (5 ft 7 in)	BLMA	(France)

Head coach

- Valérie Garnier

Assistant coach(es)

- -
- -
- -

Legend

- Club – describes last
  club before the tournament
- Age – describes age
  on 11 June 2015

=== Montenegro ===
Montenegro women's national basketball team – EuroBasket Women 2015 roster
Players
Coaches

Pos.	No.	Name	Age – Date of birth	Height	Club	Ctr.
F/C	4	Kristina Raković	20 – 26 September 1994	1.85 m (6 ft 1 in)	Šumadija Kragujevac	(Serbia)
G	5	Jelena Škerović	34 – 23 December 1980	1.77 m (5 ft 10 in)	Osmaniye Genclik	(Turkey)
F/C	6	Milica Jovanović	25 – 14 August 1989	1.89 m (6 ft 2 in)	Adana Aski	(Turkey)
C	7	Nataša Popović	33 – 14 April 1982	1.90 m (6 ft 3 in)	Čelik Zenica	(Bosnia and Herzegovina)
G	8	Jelena Vučetić	21 – 14 September 1993	1.82 m (6 ft 0 in)	Vojvodina	(Serbia)
PG	9	Snežana Aleksić	26 – 14 January 1989	1.73 m (5 ft 8 in)	Orduspor	(Turkey)
PF	10	Jelena Dubljević	28 – 7 May 1987	1.88 m (6 ft 2 in)	Galatasaray Odeabank	(Turkey)
PF	11	Milka Bjelica	33 – 22 June 1981	1.92 m (6 ft 4 in)	Hatay BŞB	(Turkey)
C	12	Iva Perovanović	31 – 1 September 1983	1.88 m (6 ft 2 in)	Orduspor	(Turkey)
G	13	Jovana Pašić	23 – 12 May 1992	1.80 m (5 ft 11 in)	Vojvodina	(Serbia)
G	14	Aleksandra Vujović	34 – 16 July 1980	1.84 m (6 ft 0 in)	Rivas Ecópolis	(Spain)
C	15	Angel Robinson	28 – 20 April 1987	1.92 m (6 ft 4 in)	CB Avenida	(Spain)

Head coach

- (Montenegro) Momir Milatović

Assistant coach(es)

- (Montenegro) Miloš Kovač
- (Montenegro) Igor Đaletić

Legend

- Club – describes last
  club before the tournament
- Age – describes age
  on 11 June 2015

=== Romania ===
Romania women's national basketball team – EuroBasket Women 2015 roster
Players
Coaches

Pos.	No.	Name	Age – Date of birth	Height	Club
SF	4	Claudia Pop	28 – 2 May 1987	1.82 m (6 ft 0 in)	Gernika Bizkaia	(Spain)
SG	5	Andreea Orosz	27 – 10 January 1988	1.83 m (6 ft 0 in)	Club Sportiv Municipal Târgoviște	(Romania)
SG	6	Sonia Ursu	28 – 25 February 1987	1.77 m (5 ft 10 in)	BC Olimpia Brasov	(Romania)
G	7	Annemarie Părău	20 – 17 January 1995	1.70 m (5 ft 7 in)	ACS Sepsi Sic	(Romania)
PG	8	Gabriela Cursaru	21 – 17 November 1993	1.61 m (5 ft 3 in)	CS Phoenix Galati	(Romania)
C	9	Elisabeth Pavel	27 – 31 January 1989	1.91 m (6 ft 3 in)	CSU Alba Iulia	(Romania)
F	11	Gabriela Irimia	26 – 3 April 1990	1.76 m (5 ft 9 in)	BC Olimpia Brasov	(Romania)
C	13	Florina Pașcalău	26 – 4 February 1989	1.96 m (6 ft 5 in)	Cluj Napoco	(Romania)
C	14	Alina Crăciun	24 – 28 June 1990	1.92 m (6 ft 4 in)	Basket Club Icim Arad	(Romania)
F/C	21	Adina Stoiedin	25 – 3 December 1989	1.87 m (6 ft 2 in)	BCM Danzio Timișoara	(Romania)
SG	24	Ancuța Stoenescu	23 – 9 February 1992	1.74 m (5 ft 9 in)	Club Sportiv Municipal Târgoviște	(Romania)
F	44	Gabriela Mărginean	28 – 17 January 1987	1.83 m (6 ft 0 in)	Agu Spor Kulubu	(Turkey)

Head coach

- Florin Nini

Assistant coach(es)

- Alexandru Radu

Legend

- Club – describes last
  club before the tournament
- Age – describes age
  on 11 June 2015

=== Ukraine ===
Ukraine women's national basketball team – EuroBasket Women 2015 roster
Players
Coaches

Pos.	No.	Name	Age – Date of birth	Height	Club
PG	4	Olga Dubrovina	28 – 2 May 1987	1.73 m (5 ft 8 in)	Haskovo 2012	(Bulgaria)
G	5	Evheniia Sharovka	27 – 10 January 1988	1.72 m (5 ft 8 in)	Okzhetpes	(Kazakhstan)
G	6	Viktoriia Shmatova	28 – 25 February 1987	1.70 m (5 ft 7 in)	Okzhetpes	(Kazakhstan)
PF	7	Tetiana Antoniuk	20 – 17 January 1995	1.84 m (6 ft 0 in)	Horizont Minsk	(Belarus)
C	8	Oleksandra Chek	21 – 17 November 1993	1.90 m (6 ft 3 in)	Léon Trégor Basket 29	(France)
G	9	Olena Samburska	27 – 31 January 1989	1.74 m (5 ft 9 in)	Montana 2003	(Bulgaria)
SF	10	Kateryna Rymarenko	26 – 3 April 1990	1.84 m (6 ft 0 in)	Utex Row Rybnik	(Poland)
C	11	Oleksandra Prystupa	26 – 4 February 1989	2.02 m (6 ft 8 in)	Okzhetpes	(Kazakhstan)
SF	12	Kateryna Dorogobuzova	24 – 28 June 1990	1.85 m (6 ft 1 in)	Basket Gdynia	(Poland)
G	13	Arina Bilotserkivska	25 – 3 December 1989	1.70 m (5 ft 7 in)	Widzew	(Poland)
G/F	14	Alina Iagupova	23 – 9 February 1992	1.86 m (6 ft 1 in)	Astana Tigers	(Kazakhstan)
PF	15	Viktoriia Mircheva	28 – 17 January 1987	1.90 m (6 ft 3 in)	COB Calais	(France)

Head coach

- Vadym Chechuro

Assistant coach(es)

- Sergii Vozniuk
- Volodymyr Kholopov

Legend

- Club – describes last
  club before the tournament
- Age – describes age
  on 11 June 2015

== Group B ==
=== Belarus ===
Belarus women's national basketball team – EuroBasket Women 2015 roster
Players
Coaches

Pos.	No.	Name	Age – Date of birth	Height	Club	Ctr.
PF	4	Maryia Papova	20 – 13 July 1994	1.89 m (6 ft 2 in)	Tsmoki Minsk	(Belarus)
PG	5	Sviatlana Kudrashova	25 – 12 July 1989	1.71 m (5 ft 7 in)	BK Horizont	(Belarus)
PF	6	Katsiaryna Snytsina	29 – 2 September 1985	1.88 m (6 ft 2 in)	Canik Belediye	(Turkey)
G/F	7	Yuliya Rytsikava	28 – 8 September 1986	1.79 m (5 ft 10 in)	BK Horizont	(Belarus)
SF	8	Tatsiana Likhtarovich	27 – 29 March 1988	1.80 m (5 ft 11 in)	BK Horizont	(Belarus)
PG	9	Volha Ziuzkova	31 – 14 June 1983	1.72 m (5 ft 8 in)	Tsmoki Minsk	(Belarus)
C	10	Anastasiya Verameyenka	27 – 10 July 1987	1.92 m (6 ft 4 in)	BK Horizont	(Belarus)
C	11	Yelena Leuchanka	32 – 30 April 1983	1.95 m (6 ft 5 in)	Yakin Dogu	(Turkey)
PG	12	Lindsey Harding	30 – 12 June 1984	1.73 m (5 ft 8 in)	İstanbul Üniversitesi B.G.D.	(Turkey)
F	13	Tatyana Troina	33 – 30 June 1981	1.87 m (6 ft 2 in)	BK Horizont	(Belarus)
F	14	Nataliya Trafimava	35 – 16 June 1979	1.86 m (6 ft 1 in)	BK Horizont	(Belarus)
C	15	Maryna Ivashchanka	21 – 8 November 1993	1.90 m (6 ft 3 in)	BK Liepaja	(Latvia)

Head coach

- (Belarus) Anatoli Buyalski

Assistant coach(es)

- (Belarus) Mikalai Buzliakou

Legend

- Club – describes last
  club before the tournament
- Age – describes age
  on 11 June 2015

=== Greece ===
Greece Women's National Basketball Team roster
Players
Coaches

Pos.	No.	Name	Age – Date of birth	Height	Club	Ctr.
PG	4	Anastasia Gkotzi	28 – 4 April 1987	1.70 m (5 ft 7 in)	Olympiacos	(Greece)
G	5	Angeliki Nikolopoulou	24 – 2 May 1991	1.78 m (5 ft 10 in)	Proteas Voulas	(Greece)
F	6	Zoi Dimitrakou	28 – 25 May 1987	1.87 m (6 ft 2 in)	Nadezhda Orenburg	(Russia)
G/F	7	Olga Chatzinikolaou	33 – 4 July 1981	1.81 m (5 ft 11 in)	Olympiacos	(Greece)
SF	8	Eleanna Christinaki	18 – 16 December 1996	1.84 m (6 ft 0 in)	Athinaikos	(Greece)
SF	9	Styliani Kaltsidou	32 – 12 January 1983	1.88 m (6 ft 2 in)	CJM Bourges	(France)
PF	10	Pelagia Papamichail	29 – 9 April 1986	1.89 m (6 ft 2 in)	Olympiacos	(Greece)
PG	11	Iouliti Lymoura	30 – 10 March 1985	1.78 m (5 ft 10 in)	Panathinaikos	(Greece)
F	12	Katerina Sotiriou	31 – 3 January 1984	1.85 m (6 ft 1 in)	Proteas Voulas	(Greece)
F	13	Afroditi Kosma	32 – 6 June 1983	1.87 m (6 ft 2 in)	Olympiacos	(Greece)
C	14	Mariella Fasoula	17 – 2 September 1997	1.94 m (6 ft 4 in)	Proteas Voulas	(Greece)
F/C	15	Artemis Spanou	22 – 1 January 1993	1.90 m (6 ft 3 in)	İstanbul Üniversitesi	(Turkey)

Head coach

- George Dikeoulakos

Assistant coach(es)

- Andreas Mavros
- Theodosios Papalikas

Legend

- (C) Team captain
- Club field describes the current club
- Age – describes age
  on 11 June 2015

=== Poland ===
Poland women's national basketball team – EuroBasket Women 2015 roster
Players
Coaches

Pos.	No.	Name	Age – Date of birth	Height	Club	Ctr.
PG	4	Julie McBride	32 – 24 September 1982	1.63 m (5 ft 4 in)	Artego Bydgoszcz	(Poland)
PG	5	Dominika Owczarzak	21 – 23 March 1994	1.68 m (5 ft 6 in)	CCC Polkowice	(Poland)
PG	6	Paulina Pawlak	30 – 1 July 1984	1.70 m (5 ft 7 in)	Ślęza Wrocław	(Poland)
PF	8	Justyna Żurowska-Cegielska	30 – 8 March 1985	1.88 m (6 ft 2 in)	Wisła Can-Pack Kraków	(Poland)
SF	10	Katarzyna Krężel	30 – 4 February 1985	1.84 m (6 ft 0 in)	Artego Bydgoszcz	(Poland)
SF	11	Elżbieta Mowlik	32 – 5 June 1983	1.80 m (5 ft 11 in)	Artego Bydgoszcz	(Poland)
PF	12	Małgorzata Misiuk	24 – 23 March 1991	1.84 m (6 ft 0 in)	Energa Toruń	(Poland)
C	13	Ewelina Kobryn	33 – 7 May 1982	1.93 m (6 ft 4 in)	UMMC Ekaterinburg	(Russia)
C	14	Marta Jujka	26 – 12 December 1988	1.93 m (6 ft 4 in)	MKK Siedlce	(Poland)
F/C	15	Magdalena Leciejewska	28 – 29 June 1986	1.90 m (6 ft 3 in)	Ślęza Wrocław	(Poland)
SG	21	Agnieszka Skobel	26 – 16 January 1989	1.80 m (5 ft 11 in)	Wisła Can-Pack Kraków	(Poland)
PF	22	Martyna Koc	31 – 10 July 1983	1.86 m (6 ft 1 in)	Artego Bydgoszcz	(Poland)

Head coach

- (Poland) Jacek Winnicki

Assistant coach(es)

- (Poland) Dariusz Raczyński
- (Poland) Krzysztof Szewczyk

Legend

- Club – describes last
  club before the tournament
- Age – describes age
  on 11 June 2015

=== Turkey ===
Turkey women's national basketball team – EuroBasket Women 2015 roster
Players
Coaches

Pos.	No.	Name	Age – Date of birth	Height	Club
G	4	Pınar Demirok	22 – 6 August 1991	1.82 m (6 ft 0 in)	Abdullah Gül Üniversitesi	(Turkey)
F	5	Tuğçe Canıtez	23 – 10 November 1990	1.90 m (6 ft 3 in)	Fenerbahçe	(Turkey)
F	6	Cansu Köksal	20 – 28 April 1994	1.87 m (6 ft 2 in)	Galatasaray OdeaBank	(Turkey)
G	7	Birsel Vardarlı	30 – 12 July 1984	1.74 m (5 ft 9 in)	Fenerbahçe	(Turkey)
G	8	Olcay Çakır	21 – 13 July 1993	1.82 m (6 ft 0 in)	Fenerbahçe	(Turkey)
F	9	Bahar Çağlar	25 – 28 September 1988	1.90 m (6 ft 3 in)	Galatasaray OdeaBank	(Turkey)
G	10	Işıl Alben	28 – 22 February 1986	1.70 m (5 ft 7 in)	Galatasaray OdeaBank	(Turkey)
C	11	Nevriye Yılmaz	34 – 16 June 1980	1.93 m (6 ft 4 in)	Galatasaray OdeaBank	(Turkey)
F	12	Lara Sanders	27 – 11 September 1986	1.91 m (6 ft 3 in)	Abdullah Gül Üniversitesi	(Turkey)
F	13	Ayşe Cora	21 – 3 March 1993	1.75 m (5 ft 9 in)	Galatasaray OdeaBank	(Turkey)
F	14	Şaziye İvegin	32 – 8 February 1982	1.83 m (6 ft 0 in)	İstanbul Üniv	(Turkey)
C	15	Tilbe Şenyürek	19 – 26 April 1995	1.87 m (6 ft 2 in)	Botaş SK	(Turkey)

Head coach

- Ekrem Memnun

Assistant coach(es)

Legend

- Club – describes last
  club before the tournament
- Age – describes age
  on 11 June 2015

== Group C ==
=== Croatia ===
Croatia women's national basketball team – EuroBasket Women 2015 roster
Players
Coaches

Pos.	No.	Name	Age – Date of birth	Height	Club
	4	Jelena Ivezić	–
	5	Iva Borović	–
	6	Carmen Miloglav	–
	10	Iva Ciglar	–
	11	Ana-Marija Begić	–
	12	Iva Slišković	–
	13	Mirna Mazić	–
	14	Luca Ivanković	–
	15	Ivana Tikvić	–
	21	Ružica Džankić	–
	22	Iva Todorić	–

Head coach

- Coach: Braslav Turić

Legend

- Club – describes last
  club before the tournament
- Age – describes age
  on 11 June 2015

=== Latvia ===
Latvia women's national basketball team – EuroBasket Women 2015 roster
Players
Coaches

Pos.	No.	Name	Age – Date of birth	Height	Club	Ctr.
SF	4	Dita Rozenberga	22 – 22 December 1992	1.80 m (5 ft 11 in)	San Salvatore	(Italy)
PG	6	Zane Eglīte	30 – 10 December 1984	1.70 m (5 ft 7 in)	RSU/Merks	(Latvia)
PF	7	Ieva Kūlīte	26 – 2 July 1988	1.88 m (6 ft 2 in)	TTT Riga	(Latvia)
SF	8	Gunta Baško-Melnbārde	35 – 27 April 1980	1.81 m (5 ft 11 in)	Basket Landes	(France)
SG	10	Anete Jēkabsone-Žogota	31 – 12 August 1983	1.77 m (5 ft 10 in)	Dynamo Kursk	(Russia)
C	11	Aija Putniņa	27 – 15 January 1988	1.92 m (6 ft 4 in)	San Martino	(Italy)
PF	12	Anete Šteinberga	25 – 29 January 1990	1.90 m (6 ft 3 in)	Castors Braine	(Belgium)
SF	13	Dita Liepkalne	28 – 30 April 1987	1.82 m (6 ft 0 in)	CB Bembibre	(Spain)
C	14	Kristīne Vītola	24 – 2 June 1991	1.96 m (6 ft 5 in)	Mann Filter	(Spain)
SF	20	Kate Aizsila	21 – 3 May 1994	1.77 m (5 ft 10 in)	RSU/Merks	(Latvia)
C	22	Zenta Meļņika	23 – 6 September 1991	1.96 m (6 ft 5 in)	TTT Riga	(Latvia)
SF	32	Kitija Laksa	19 – 21 May 1996	1.84 m (6 ft 0 in)	TTT Riga	(Latvia)

Head coach

- (Latvia) Ainārs Zvirgzdiņš

Assistant coach(es)

- (Latvia) Aivars Vīnbergs
- (Latvia) Mārtiņš Zībarts

Legend

- Club – describes last
  club before the tournament
- Age – describes age
  on 11 June 2015

=== Russia ===
Russia women's national basketball team – EuroBasket Women 2015 roster
Players
Coaches

Pos.	No.	Name	Age – Date of birth	Height	Club	Ctr.
SG	4	Daria Namok	22 – 14 February 1993	1.79 m (5 ft 10 in)	Spartak Moscow Region	(Russia)
SF	5	Evgeniya Belyakova	28 – 27 June 1986	1.84 m (6 ft 0 in)	Dynamo Kursk	(Russia)
PF	6	Anastasia Logunova	24 – 20 July 1990	1.92 m (6 ft 4 in)	Chevakata Vologda	(Russia)
PF	7	Marina Kuzina	29 – 19 July 1985	1.94 m (6 ft 4 in)	Nadezhda Orenburg	(Russia)
SG	8	Elena Kirillova	29 – 27 January 1986	1.86 m (6 ft 1 in)	Nadezhda Orenburg	(Russia)
PG	9	Elena Beglova	27 – 1 September 1987	1.76 m (5 ft 9 in)	Nadezhda Orenburg	(Russia)
SG	10	Epiphanny Prince	27 – 11 January 1988	1.75 m (5 ft 9 in)	Dynamo Kursk	(Russia)
C	11	Natalia Vieru	25 – 25 July 1989	1.96 m (6 ft 5 in)	Nadezhda Orenburg	(Russia)
C	12	Irina Osipova	33 – 25 June 1981	1.97 m (6 ft 6 in)	Dynamo Kursk	(Russia)
SF	13	Liudmila Sapova	31 – 3 May 1984	1.88 m (6 ft 2 in)	Dynamo Kursk	(Russia)
PF	14	Ksenia Tikhonenko	22 – 11 January 1993	1.93 m (6 ft 4 in)	Spartak Moscow Region	(Russia)
C	15	Maria Vadeeva	16 – 17 June 1998	1.90 m (6 ft 3 in)	Spartak Moscow Region	(Russia)

Head coach

- (Russia) Anatoly Myshkin

Legend

- Club – describes last
  club before the tournament
- Age – describes age
  on 11 June 2015

=== Serbia ===
Serbia women's national basketball team – EuroBasket Women 2015 roster
Players
Coaches

Pos.	No.	Name	Age – Date of birth	Height	Club
G	4	Tamara Radočaj	27 – 23 December 1987	1.70 m (5 ft 7 in)	UNI Győr	(Hungary)
F	5	Sonja Petrović	26 – 18 February 1989	1.89 m (6 ft 2 in)	USK Praha	(Czech Republic)
G	6	Saša Čađo	25 – 13 July 1989	1.78 m (5 ft 10 in)	Canik Belediye	(Turkey)
C	7	Sara Krnjić	23 – 15 July 1991	1.93 m (6 ft 4 in)	UNIQA Sopron	(Hungary)
G	8	Nevena Jovanović	24 – 30 June 1990	1.79 m (5 ft 10 in)	PEAC-Pécs	(Hungary)
F	9	Jelena Milovanović	27 – 28 April 1989	1.90 m (6 ft 3 in)	Dynamo Kursk	(Russia)
G	10	Dajana Butulija	30 – 23 February 1986	1.75 m (5 ft 9 in)	Uppsala Basket	(Sweden)
C	11	Tijana Ajduković	24 – 3 June 1991	1.97 m (6 ft 6 in)	Energa Toruń	(Poland)
F	12	Kristina Topuzović	20 – 23 August 1994	1.79 m (5 ft 10 in)	Radivoj Korać	(Serbia)
G	13	Milica Dabović (C)	33 – 16 February 1982	1.70 m (5 ft 7 in)	Lyon Basket	(France)
G	14	Ana Dabović	25 – 18 August 1989	1.83 m (6 ft 0 in)	Ormanspor	(Turkey)
F	15	Danielle Page	28 – 14 November 1986	1.88 m (6 ft 2 in)	Basket Landes	(France)

Head coach

- Marina Maljković

Assistant coach(es)

- Bojan Janković
- Miloš Pađen
- Dragan Ratković

Legend

- Club – describes last
  club before the tournament
- Age – describes age
  on 11 June 2015

== Group D ==
=== Spain ===
Spain women's national basketball team – EuroBasket Women 2015 roster
Players
Coaches

Pos.	No.	Name	Age – Date of birth	Height	Club
F	4	Laura Nicholls	26 – 26 February 1989	1.90 m (6 ft 3 in)	Kayseri Kaski	(Turkey)
G	5	Leticia Romero	20 – 28 May 1995	1.74 m (5 ft 9 in)	Florida State Seminoles	(United States)
G	6	Sílvia Domínguez	28 – 31 January 1987	1.67 m (5 ft 6 in)	UMMC Ekaterinburg	(Russia)
F	7	Alba Torrens	25 – 30 August 1989	1.91 m (6 ft 3 in)	UMMC Ekaterinburg	(Russia)
C	8	Astou Ndour	20 – 22 August 1994	1.96 m (6 ft 5 in)	Fenerbahçe	(Turkey)
G	9	Laia Palau (C)	35 – 10 September 1979	1.81 m (5 ft 11 in)	ZVVZ USK Praha	(Czech Republic)
G	10	Marta Xargay	24 – 20 December 1990	1.80 m (5 ft 11 in)	CB Avenida	(Spain)
F	11	Nuria Martínez	31 – 29 February 1984	1.75 m (5 ft 9 in)	Galatasaray S.K.	(Turkey)
F	12	Laura Gil	23 – 24 April 1992	1.91 m (6 ft 3 in)	Cadí La Seu	(Spain)
C	13	Lucila Pascua	32 – 21 March 1983	1.96 m (6 ft 5 in)	CB Conquero	(Spain)
C	14	Laura Herrera	25 – 11 July 1989	1.89 m (6 ft 2 in)	Mann-Filter	(Spain)
G	15	Anna Cruz	28 – 27 October 1986	1.79 m (5 ft 10 in)	Nadezhda Orenburg	(Russia)

Head coach

- Lucas Mondelo

Assistant coach(es)

- Víctor Lapeña
- Isabel Sánchez

Legend

- Club – describes last
  club before the tournament
- Age – describes age
  on 11 June 2015

=== Sweden ===
Sweden women's national basketball team – EuroBasket Women 2015 roster
Players
Coaches

Pos.	No.	Name	Age – Date of birth	Height	Club
G	3	Stefanie Yderström	25 – 23 April 1990	1.70 m (5 ft 7 in)	Flammes Carolo Basket	(France)
C	5	Danielle Hamilton-Carter	25 – 23 January 1990	1.92 m (6 ft 4 in)	Lyon Basket	(France)
SG	6	Frida Eldebrink	27 – 4 January 1988	1.75 m (5 ft 9 in)	Beşiktaş JK	(Turkey)
SG	7	Ashley Key	30 – 1 June 1985	1.80 m (5 ft 11 in)	Hatay BSB	(Turkey)
PF	8	Kadidja Andersson	35 – 7 February 1980	1.83 m (6 ft 0 in)	Sallen Basket	(Sweden)
G	9	Elin Eldebrink	28 – 4 January 1988	1.74 m (5 ft 9 in)	Chevakata Vologda	(Russia)
SF	10	Elisabeth Egnell	28 – 19 November 1987	1.86 m (6 ft 1 in)	PINKK Pecsi 424	(Hungary)
PG	11	Martina Stålvant	26 – 27 May 1989	1.76 m (5 ft 9 in)	Northland Basket Lulea	(Sweden)
PF	12	Anna Barthold	35 – 31 March 1980	1.85 m (6 ft 1 in)	Northland Basket Lulea	(Sweden)
SF	13	Binta Drammeh	23 – 21 May 1992	1.81 m (5 ft 11 in)	Hatay BSB	(Turkey)
C	14	Louice Halvarsson	26 – 15 January 1989	1.91 m (6 ft 3 in)	PINKK Pecsi 424	(Hungary)
PF	15	Josefin Vesterberg	21 – 2 November 1993	1.90 m (6 ft 3 in)	Northland Basket Lulea	(France)

Head coach

- Lars Johansson

Assistant coach(es)

- Jurgita Kausaite
- David Leman

Legend

- Club – describes last
  club before the tournament
- Age – describes age
  on 11 June 2015
