= Beglov =

Beglov (Russian: Беглов) is a Russian masculine surname, its feminine counterpart is Beglova. Notable people with the surname include:

- Alexander Beglov (born 1956), Russian politician
- Elena Beglova (born 1987), Russian basketball player
