= Marica Gajić =

Bosnian woman basketball player

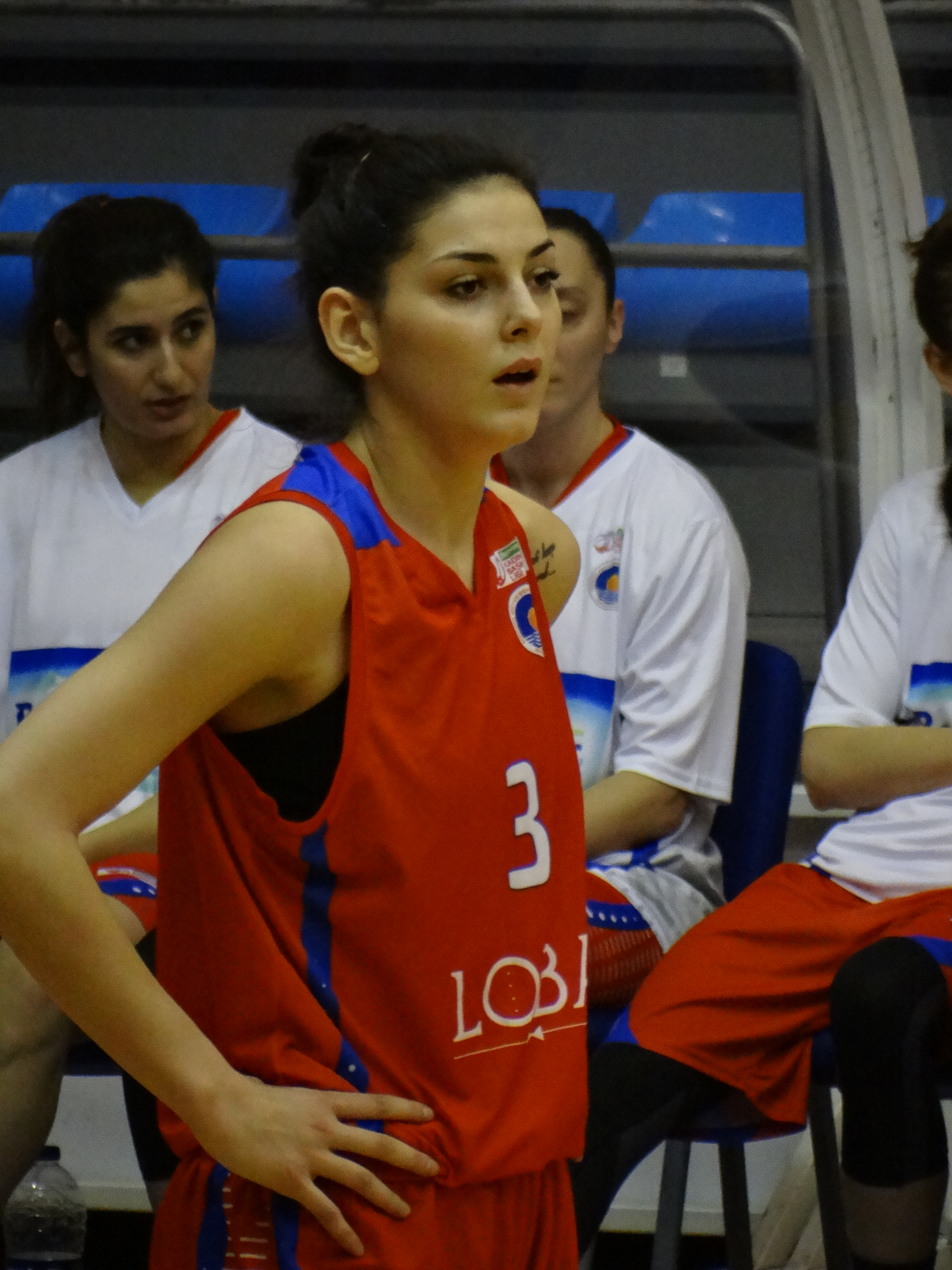

Flammes Carolo Basket
- Positions: Power forward, center
- League: Ligue Féminine de Basketball

Personal information
- Born: 27 April 1995 (age 30) Bijeljina, Bosnia and Herzegovina
- Listed height: 185 cm (6 ft 1 in)

Career information
- WNBA draft: 2015: 3rd round, 32nd overall pick
- Drafted by: Washington Mystics

Career history
- 2021-2022: Flammes Carolo Basket

Career highlights
- Bosnian Sportswoman of the Year (2020)
- Stats at Basketball Reference

Marica Gajić (27 April 1995, Bijeljina, Bosnia and Herzegovina) is a Bosnian basketball player. She is a member and current captain of the women's basketball team of Bosnia and Herzegovina. She plays for the French Ligue Féminine de Basketball club Flammes Carolo Basket.

== Career ==
She started her career in Budućnost from Bijeljina, at the age of 15 she played a season in the jersey of ŽKK RMU Banovići from Banovići. After that she played for ŽKK Celje from Celje, then, in the Turkish Women's Basketball Super League for Girne Yakin Dogu and then Mersin and Hatay. Recently, she played for the Spanish Liga Femenina de Baloncesto club CB Avenida (full name: Perfumerías Avenida Baloncesto, formerly C.B. Halcón Viajes). Currently, Gajić is a member of the French Ligue Féminine de Basketball club Flammes Carolo Basket.
