= Ashley Walker (basketball) =

American basketball player (born 1987)

Personal information
- Born: February 24, 1987 (age 39) Stockton, California, U.S.
- Listed height: 6 ft 1 in (1.85 m)
- Listed weight: 200 lb (91 kg)

Career information
- High school: Grace M. Davis (Modesto, California)
- College: California (2005–2009)
- WNBA draft: 2009: 1st round, 12th overall pick
- Drafted by: Seattle Storm
- Position: Power forward / center

Career history
- 2009: Seattle Storm
- 2010: Tulsa Shock
- 2013: Connecticut Sun
- 2019: Los Angeles Sparks

Career highlights
- Third-team All-American – AP (2009); All-American – USBWA (2009); 2× First-team All Pac-10 (2008, 2009); 2× Pac-10 All-Defensive Team (2008, 2009); All Pac-10 (2007); Pac-10 All-Freshman Team (2006)
- Stats at WNBA.com
- Stats at Basketball Reference

Ashley Walker (born February 24, 1987) is an American-Romanian professional basketball player. She plays the forward position for the Reyer Venezia in the Italian Serie A1.

== Personal life ==
She was born Ashley Jeneen Walker on February 24, 1987, in Stockton, California. Walker is the daughter of Tiran and Jackie Walker. She has an older brother, Tiran Jr., who plays basketball in England. Her relative James Hardy played basketball for the New Orleans/Utah Jazz of the NBA. She was an American Studies major at the University of California, Berkeley.

== High school career ==
Ashley attended Grace M. Davis High School in Modesto, California. She was named to the Cal-Hi Sports all-state team and league MVP as a senior after averaging 21 points, 20 rebounds, five assists and six blocks per game at Grace Davis. Walker also competed on the varsity volleyball team for four years and the track and field team for one year. She claimed the 2004 conference high jump title and was picked to the all-conference volleyball team three times.

== College career ==
Walker attended the University of California. She played four seasons with the Bears of Cal. She played the forward position and the center position. Walker was the only player in Cal history to score at least 1,000 points, 800 rebounds, 200 assists, and 100 blocks. She recorded 47 career double-doubles. She is ranked first in Cal history for rebounds, free-throws made, and free-throws attempted.

As a freshman, she was one of three Cal players picked to the Pac-10 All-Freshman squad, marking the first time a conference team had more than two selections. As a sophomore Walker was selected to the All-Pac-10 team along with Devanei Hampton, marking only the second time in school history that the Bears placed two players on the All-Pac-10 squad. When she became a junior she became one of only four Cal players to garner first-team All-Pac-10 honors at least twice. She was named to the Pac-10 All-Defensive team and Sports Illustrated second-team All-American. As a junior, she became the 17th Cal player to reach the 1,000-point milestone. As a senior at Cal she was the 2008–09 Pac-10 scoring leader averaging 19.8 points per game. She was named to the First team All-Pac-10 and First team Pac-10 All-Defensive team.

== WNBA career ==
Walker declared for the WNBA draft after 4 seasons at the University of California. She was selected 12th overall in the 2009 WNBA draft by the Seattle Storm. She joined WNBA veterans Sue Bird, Swin Cash, and Lauren Jackson. Seattle waived Ashley during the start of the 2010 season. She would then sign with the Tulsa Shock, but was later waived by them as well. In February 2011 she was signed to a training camp contract with the San Antonio Silver Stars for the upcoming season, but would be waived. She signed with the Washington Mystics for the 2012 season. Then, after a short period in Romania, she joined the Connecticut Sun in 2013. In February 2019, Walker signed with the Los Angeles Sparks. She scored 28 points and eight rebounds in two games before being cut in training camp. Walker returned to the Sparks roster in June 2019 as a result of an injury hardship exception. In her regular season debut with the Sparks on June 6, Walker posted two points, two rebounds, three assists, and one steal in a loss to the Connecticut Sun.

== International career ==
Walker signed to play with Maccabi Ashdod in Israel for the 2009–2010 off-season. She would go on to take the league MVP honor after her season there, as her team was runner-up in the Israeli league finals. For the 2010–2011 season, she would go back to Israel to play for Maccabi Ramat Hen. Prior to going back to Israel in 2010 she played in Ukraine for Dynamo NPU. For the 2011-2012 WNBA off-season, she would go to Turkey to play for Ceyhan Belediyespor. In 2013, she signed for CSM Târgovişte in Romania.

== Career statistics ==
Legend
GP	Games played	GS	Games started	MPG	Minutes per game	RPG	Rebounds per game
APG	Assists per game	SPG	Steals per game	BPG	Blocks per game	PPG	Points per game
TO	Turnovers per game	FG%	Field-goal percentage	3P%	3-point field-goal percentage	FT%	Free-throw percentage
**Bold**	Career best	°	League leader

=== College ===
Year	Team	GP	Points	FG%	3P%	FT%	RPG	APG	SPG	BPG	PPG
2005-06	California	30	398	49.5	25.0	68.0	7.7	1.6	**1.5**	**1.7**	13.3
2006-07	California	32	552	53.2	-	76.7	8.7	2.2	1.3	1.3	17.3
2007-08	California	**34**	520	51.4	-	**78.1**	**9.3**	**2.4**	1.2	1.3	15.3
2008-09	California	**34**	**672**	**55.3**	**41.9**	76.2	8.6	1.7	1.4	1.0	**19.8**
Career	California	130	2142	52.7	35.0	75.3	8.6	2.0	1.4	1.3	16.5

=== WNBA ===
==== Regular season ====
Year	Team	GP	GS	MPG	FG%	3P%	FT%	RPG	APG	SPG	BPG	TO	PPG
2009	Seattle	**13**	0	6.9	.250	.167	.800	1.8	0.3	0.2	0.2	0.5	1.8
2010	Tulsa	2	0	4.5	.000	.000	–	0.0	0.0	**1.0**	0.0	1.0	0.0
2013	Connecticut	7	0	**7.9**	**.294**	**.250**	**1.000**	**2.3**	0.3	0.3	**0.4**	0.9	**1.9**
2019	Los Angeles	3	0	7.3	.091	.000	–	1.0	**1.0**	0.3	0.0	**0.0**	0.7
Career	4 years, 4 teams	25	0	7.0	.220	.150	.818	1.7	0.4	0.3	0.2	0.6	1.5

==== Playoffs ====
Year	Team	GP	GS	MPG	FG%	3P%	FT%	RPG	APG	SPG	BPG	TO	PPG
2009	Seattle	1	0	1.0	–	–	–	0.0	0.0	0.0	0.0	1.0	0.0
