= Francesca Dotto =

Italian basketball player

No. 10 – Gesam Gas Lucca
- Position: Point guard
- League: LegA

Personal information
- Born: 17 March 1993 (age 33) Camposampiero, Italy
- Listed height: 5 ft 7 in (1.70 m)

Francesca Dotto (born 17 March 1993) is an Italian basketball player for Gesam Gas Lucca and the Italian national team.

She participated at the EuroBasket Women 2017.
