= Karolína Elhotová =

Czech basketball player

No. 6 – USK Praha
- Position: Small forward
- League: ŽBL

Personal information
- Born: January 7, 1992 (age 34) Prague, Czechoslovakia
- Listed height: 6 ft 0 in (1.83 m)

Karolína Elhotová (born January 7, 1992) is a Czech basketball player for USK Praha and the Czech national team.

She participated at the EuroBasket Women 2017.
