= Viktoryia Hasper =

Belarusian basketball player

No. 21 – BC Horizont Minsk Region
- Position: Center
- League: BPL

Personal information
- Born: 9 January 1988 (age 38) Minsk, Soviet Union
- Listed height: 6 ft 4 in (1.93 m)
- Listed weight: 191 lb (87 kg)

Viktoryia Hasper (born 9 January 1988) is a Belarusian basketball player who competed in the 2008 Summer Olympics.
