= Rachael Vanderwal =

British basketball player (born 1983)

Personal information
- Born: 27 June 1983 (age 43) Burlington, Ontario, Canada
- Listed height: 5 ft 9 in (175 cm)
- Listed weight: 146 lb (66 kg)

Career highlights
- AEC All-Defensive Team (2006); First-team All-AEC (2006)
Medals
Women's basketball
Representing England
Commonwealth Games
Silver medal – second place	2018 Gold Coast	Team

Rachael Vanderwal (born 27 June 1983) is a 5'9 (1.75m) former point guard for Great Britain women's national basketball team. She was part of the squad for the 2012 Summer Olympics and part of the England squad that took silver at the 2018 Commonwealth Games. She has dual citizenship with Great Britain and Canada.

== Biography ==
Rachael grew up in Hamilton, Ontario Canada. She figure skated until the age of 12, when she took up the sport of basketball. She played for Bishop Ryan Secondary School in Hamilton winning the provincial championship her final year in 2001. She played for Boston University in the NCAA Division 1 from 2002 to 2006 in the America East Conference. She captained the squad her sophomore, junior and senior years. As a freshman, BU won the America East and went to the NCAA tournament, playing the national champions University of Connecticut in the first round. She received All-Conference first team and All-Defensive team her senior year. She remains in the career top ten in minutes played.

Rachael has played professionally in the Irish Superleague from 2007 to 2014. Her first two seasons were with Donoughmore, County Cork where she won National Cup and League Titles and Player of the Year back to back. In 2009, she transferred to the University of Limerick where she led the league in scoring. The UL huskies have dominated the Irish Superleague in recent years winning 4 regular season titles, 3 national cups and 3 league playoffs from 2010 to 2014, with Rachael playing a dominant role. Rachael won Player of the Year three years in a row from 2011 to 2013.

She then moved on to playing professionally in the top Liga Femenina in Spain for the past five seasons from 2014 to 2019. She has played for Gernika Bizkaia, Mann-Filter, and Uni Ferrol.

She made her Great Britain Senior debut in 2010 against Portugal. She has played with the senior team ever since, participating in Eurobasket 2011, the London Olympics 2012, Eurobasket 2013, Eurobasket Qualifiers 2014, Eurobasket 2015, Eurobasket Qualifiers 2016, Eurobasket Qualifiers 2018 and most recently Eurobasket 2019 where Team GB placed 4th and received a bid to the 2020 Tokyo Olympic qualifiers. She received her 50th cap in the London Olympics against Brazil. She received her 100th cap playing against and officially announced her retirement on October 5, 2022. She has 118 caps and prior to finishing her career, she married fellow GB player Eilidh Simpson two months earlier then moved to Australia and got a dog called Moose.

== Boston University statistics ==
Legend
GP	Games played	GS	Games started	MPG	Minutes per game
FG%	Field goal percentage	3P%	3-point field goal percentage	FT%	Free throw percentage
RPG	Rebounds per game	APG	Assists per game	SPG	Steals per game
BPG	Blocks per game	PPG	Points per game	**Bold**	Career high

Year	Team	GP	Points	FG%	3P%	FT%	RPG	APG	SPG	BPG	PPG
2002-03	Boston University	21	66	31.0%	21.4%	76.0%	1.7	1.1	1.3	0.0	3.1
2003-04	Boston University	30	123	40.8%	10.0%	52.3%	2.8	2.4	1.3	0.0	4.1
2004-05	Boston University	**31**	351	**43.8%**	**35.6%**	**81.3%**	4.9	**4.8**	**1.4**	**0.3**	11.3
2005-06	Boston University	30	**380**	38.3%	28.3%	70.6%	**6.4**	3.5	1.1	0.1	**12.7**
Career		112	920	39.9%	29.1%	71.9%	4.1	3.1	1.3	0.1	8.2
