= Alena Hanušová =

Czech basketball player

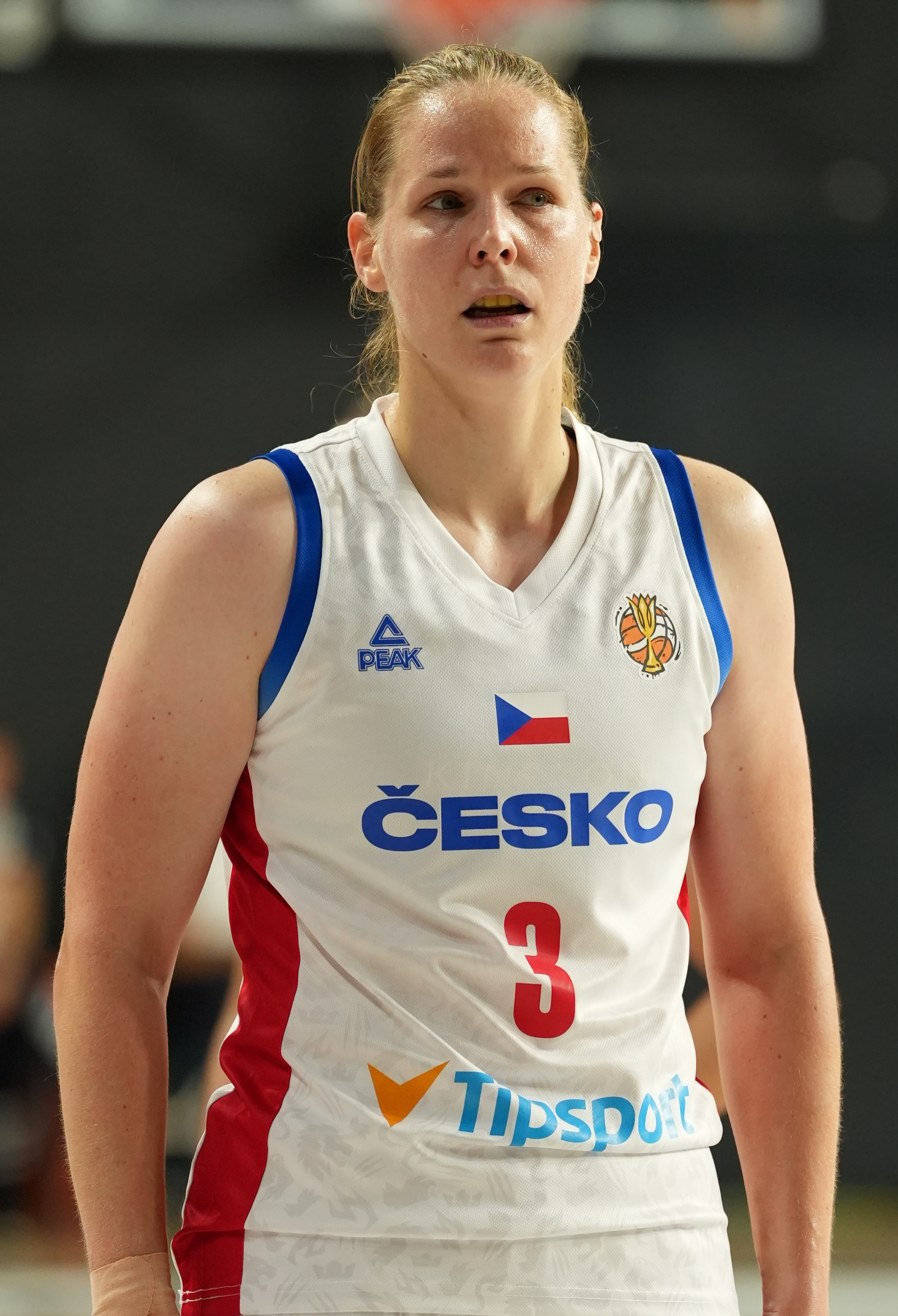

No. 7 – USK Praha
- Position: Power forward
- League: ŽBL

Personal information
- Born: 29 May 1991 (age 35) Sokolov, Czechoslovakia
- Listed height: 6 ft 3 in (1.91 m)
- Listed weight: 183 lb (83 kg)

Alena Hanušová (Czech pronunciation: [ˈalɛna ˈɦanuʃovaː]; born 29 May 1991, Sokolov) is a Czech professional basketball player. She plays for the Czech Republic women's national basketball team and USK Praha. She has represented the national team in several Eurobasket Women competitions and represented country at the 2012 Summer Olympics.
