= Krisztina Raksányi =

Hungarian basketball player

No. 5 – PEAC-Pécs
- Position: Shooting guard
- League: NB I/A

Personal information
- Born: 26 September 1991 (age 35) Altötting, Germany
- Listed height: 5 ft 11 in (1.80 m)

Krisztina Raksányi (born 26 September 1991) is a Hungarian basketball player for PEAC-Pécs and the Hungarian national team.

She participated at the EuroBasket Women 2017.
