= Ivana Tikvić =

Croatian basketball player

Olympiacos
- Position: Center
- League: Greek League

Personal information
- Born: 20 March 1994 (age 32) Zagreb, Croatia
- Listed height: 1.94 m (6 ft 4 in)

Career information
- Playing career: 2009–present

Career history
- 2009-2015: Medveščak
- 2015-2018: PF Umbertide
- 2018-2019: Olympiacos

Ivana Tikvić (born 20 March 1994) is a Croatian female professional basketball player. She currently plays for Olympiacos in Greece.
