= Lenka Bartáková =

Czech basketball player and Olympic athlete

No. 9 – Basketball Nymburk
- Position: Point guard
- League: ŽBL

Personal information
- Born: 17 May 1991 (age 35) Sokolov, Czechoslovakia
- Listed height: 5 ft 9 in (1.75 m)

Lenka Bartáková (Czech pronunciation: [ˈlɛŋka ˈbartaːkovaː]; born 17 May 1991) is a Czech professional basketball player. She plays for Czech Republic women's national basketball team. She competed in the 2012 Summer Olympics.
