= Arina Bilotserkivska =

Ukrainian basketball player

BC Interkhim Odesa
- Position: Point guard
- League: UBSL

Personal information
- Born: December 3, 1989 (age 36) Zhytomyr, Soviet Union
- Listed height: 5 ft 7 in (1.70 m)

Arina Bilotserkivska (born December 3, 1989) is a Ukrainian basketball player for BC Interkhim Odesa and the Ukrainian national team.

She participated at the EuroBasket Women 2017.
