= Romana Hejdová =

Czech basketball player

Angers BC
- Position: Guard
- League: LFB

Personal information
- Born: 9 May 1988 (age 38) Brno, Czechoslovakia
- Listed height: 6 ft 0 in (1.83 m)

Romana Hejdová (born 9 May 1988) is a Czech basketball player who competed in the 2008 Summer Olympics.
