= Cansu Köksal =

Turkish basketball player

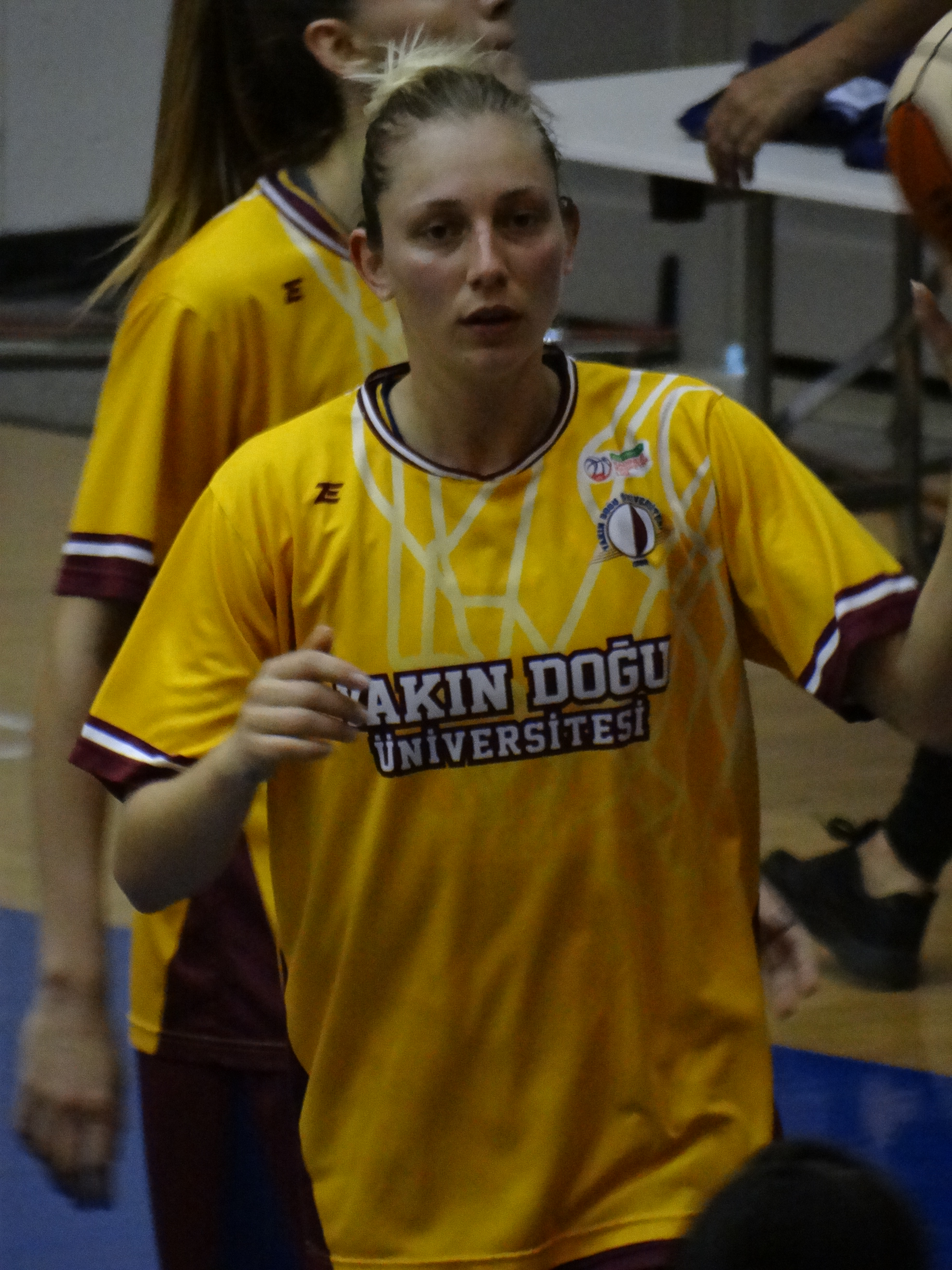

No. 7 – Beşiktaş
- Position: Small forward
- League: Turkish Super League

Personal information
- Born: 28 April 1994 (age 32) Istanbul, Turkey
- Listed height: 6 ft 2 in (1.88 m)

Career information
- WNBA draft: 2016: undrafted
- Playing career: 2005–present

Career history
- 2005–2015: Fenerbahçe
- 2015–2017: Galatasaray
- 2017–2018: Yakın Doğu Üniversitesi
- 2018–2019: Hatay BB
- 2019: BOTAŞ
- 2020: USO Mondeville
- 2020–2021: Galatasaray
- 2021–present: Beşiktaş

Cansu Köksal (born 28 April 1994) is a Turkish basketball player. The 1.87 m (6 ft 1 1/2 in) national plays small forward. Currently, she is a member of Beşiktaş.

== See also ==
- Turkish women in sports
