= Elena Beglova =

Russian basketball player

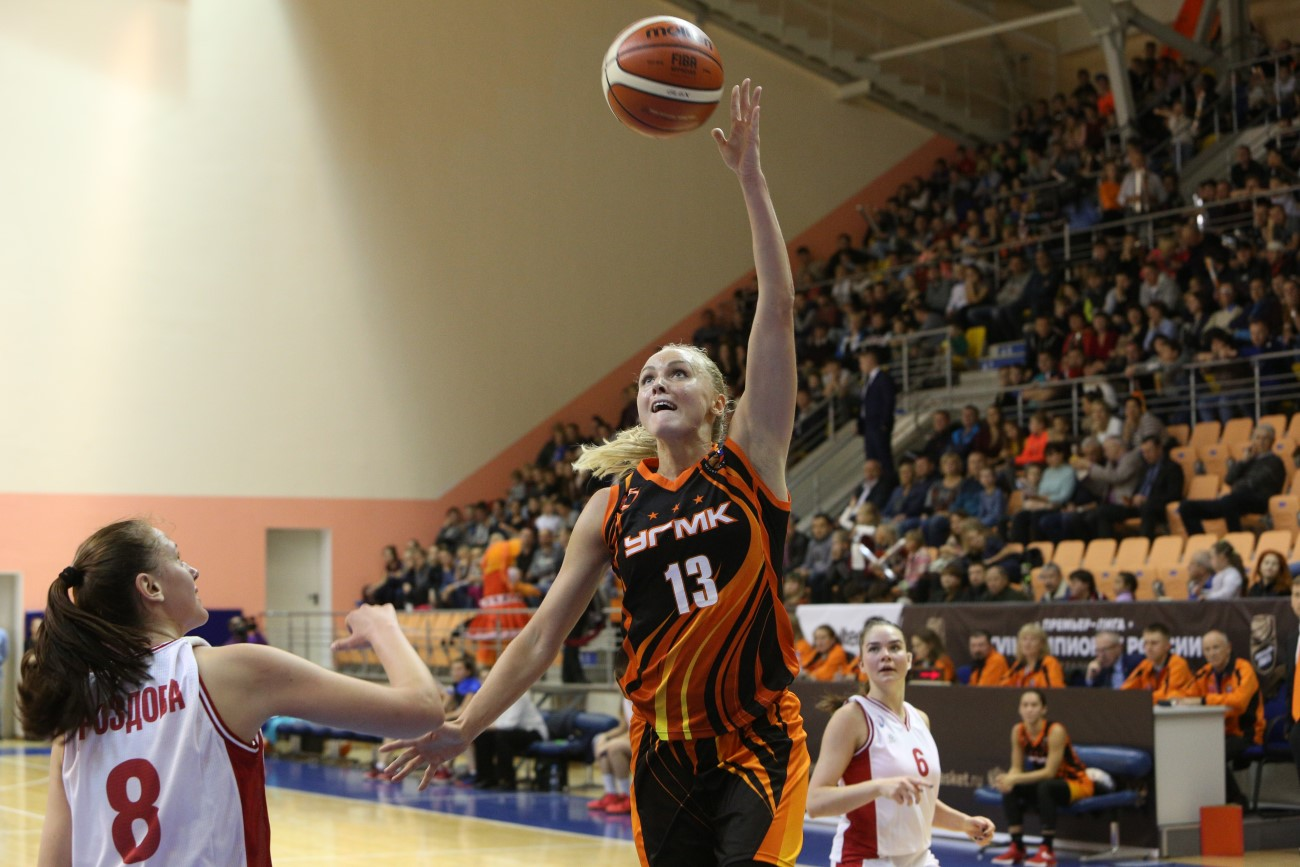

No. 13 – UMMC Ekaterinburg
- Position: Point guard
- League: RPL

Personal information
- Born: September 1, 1987 (age 39) Moscow, Soviet Union
- Listed height: 5 ft 9 in (1.75 m)

Elena Nikolayevna Beglova (Russian: Елена Николаевна Беглова; born September 1, 1987) is a Russian basketball player for UMMC Ekaterinburg and the Russian national team. She participated at the EuroBasket Women 2017.
