= 2017–18 EuroLeague Women =

EuroLeague Women
- Season: 2017–18
- Dates: 26 September – 3 October 2017 (qualifying); 11 October 2017 – 22 April 2018 (competition proper)
- Games played: 129
- Teams: 16 (competition proper); 18 (total)

Finals
- Champions: (Russia) UMMC Ekaterinburg (4th title)
- Runners-up: (Hungary) Sopron Basket
- Third place: (Russia) Dynamo Kursk
- Fourth place: (Turkey) Yakın Doğu Üniversitesi
- Final Four MVP: (Belgium) Emma Meesseman

Statistical leaders
Points	(United States) Kayla McBride	18.7
Rebounds	(United States) Jantel Lavender	8.6
Assists	(Hungary) Courtney Vandersloot	9.0

The 2017–18 EuroLeague Women was the 60th edition of the European women's club basketball championship organized by FIBA, and the 22nd edition since being rebranded as the EuroLeague Women.

== Team allocation ==
A total of 18 teams from 10 countries will participate in the 2017–18 EuroLeague Women.

=== Teams ===
League positions of the previous season shown in parentheses (TH: EuroLeague Women title holders; EC: EuroCup Women title holders):

Regular season
(Turkey) Yakın Doğu Üniversitesi^{EC} (1st)	(Russia) Dynamo Kursk^{TH} (2nd)	(Belgium) Castors Braine (1st)	(Poland) Wisła Can-Pack (2nd)
(Turkey) Fenerbahçe (2nd)	(Russia) Nadezhda Orenburg (3rd)	(Czech Republic) USK Praha (1st)	(Spain) Perfumerías Avenida (1st)
(Turkey) Galatasaray (3rd)	(France) ESBVA-LM (1st)	(Hungary) Sopron Basket (1st)	
(Russia) UMMC Ekaterinburg (1st)	(France) Tango Bourges Basket (4th)	(Italy) Famila Schio (2nd)	
Qualifying round
(France) Basket Lattes (2nd)	(Hungary) KSC Szekszárd (2nd)	(Poland) CCC Polkowice (3rd)	(Slovakia) Piešťanské Čajky (2nd)

== Round and draw dates ==
The schedule of the competition is as follows:

Phase	Round	Draw date	Round date
Qualifying round	First leg	4 July 2017	26 September 2017
Qualifying round	Second leg	4 July 2017	29 September–3 October 2017
Regular season	Matchday 1	4 July 2017	11 October 2017
Regular season	Matchday 2	4 July 2017	18–19 October 2017
Regular season	Matchday 3	4 July 2017	25 October 2017
Regular season	Matchday 4	4 July 2017	1 November 2017
Regular season	Matchday 5	4 July 2017	22–23 November 2017
Regular season	Matchday 6	4 July 2017	29 November 2017
Regular season	Matchday 7	4 July 2017	6–7 December 2017
Regular season	Matchday 8	4 July 2017	13–14 December 2017
Regular season	Matchday 9	4 July 2017	20 December 2017
Regular season	Matchday 10	4 July 2017	3–4 January 2018
Regular season	Matchday 11	4 July 2017	10–11 January 2018
Regular season	Matchday 12	4 July 2017	17 January 2018
Regular season	Matchday 13	4 July 2017	24–25 January 2018
Regular season	Matchday 14	4 July 2017	31 January 2018
Quarter-finals play-offs	First leg	4 July 2017	28 February 2018
Quarter-finals play-offs	Second leg	4 July 2017	7 March 2018
Quarter-finals play-offs	Third leg	4 July 2017	14 March 2018
Final Four	Semi-finals	4 July 2017	20 April 2018
Final Four	Final	4 July 2017	22 April 2018

=== Draw ===
The draw was held on 4 July 2017 at the FIBA headquarters in Munich, Germany. The 16 teams were drawn into two groups of eight. For the draw, the teams were seeded into eight seeds, based on their performance in European competitions in the last three seasons.

Seed 1 Team (Russia) UMMC Ekaterinburg (Russia) Dynamo Kursk	Seed 2 Team (Czech Republic) USK Praha (Turkey) Fenerbahçe	Seed 3 Team (Russia) Nadezhda Orenburg (France) Tango Bourges Basket	Seed 4 Team (Turkey) Galatasaray (Italy) Famila Schio
Seed 5 Team (France) ESBVA-LM (Spain) Perfumerías Avenida	Seed 6 Team (Poland) Wisła Can-Pack (Belgium) Castors Braine	Seed 7 Team (Hungary) Sopron Basket (Turkey) Yakın Doğu Üniversitesi	Seed 8 Team (Poland) CCC Polkowice (France) Basket Lattes

== Qualifying round ==
Team 1	Agg.	Team 2	1st leg	2nd leg
Piešťanské Čajky (Slovakia)	106–147	(Poland) CCC Polkowice	46–71	60–76
KSC Szekszárd (Hungary)	151–165	(France) Basket Lattes	80–79	71–86

== Regular season ==
Location of teams of the 2017–18 Euroleague Women regular season.
Green: Group A; Red: Group B.

Regular season started on 11 October 2017 and finished on 31 January 2018.

The four top teams of each group will qualify to the quarterfinals.

If teams are level on record at the end of the Regular Season, tiebreakers are applied in the following order:

1. Head-to-head record.
2. Head-to-head point differential.
3. Point differential during the Regular Season.
4. Points scored during the regular season.
5. Sum of quotients of points scored and points allowed in each Regular Season game.

=== Group A ===
Pos	Team	Pld	W	L	PF	PA	PD	Pts	Qualification	KUR	SOP	USK	BOU	GAL	VIL	POL	CAS
1	(Russia) Dynamo Kursk	14	14	0	1218	920	+298	28	Advance to quarterfinals	—	86–66	109–88	94–63	102–45	83–68	83–73	84–68
2	(Hungary) Sopron Basket	14	10	4	1014	940	+74	24	Advance to quarterfinals	74–88	—	71–79	57–50	72–55	82–56	70–53	83–59
3	(Czech Republic) ZVVZ USK Praha	14	8	6	1015	1020	−5	22	Advance to quarterfinals	56–88	61–77	—	64–61	83–80	88–51	72–66	67–68
4	(France) Tango Bourges Basket	14	7	7	959	948	+11	21	Advance to quarterfinals	65–76	76–65	86–72	—	72–74	64–60	82–72	62–52
5	(Turkey) Galatasaray	14	6	8	980	1088	−108	20	Transfer to EuroCup Women	67–92	73–75	82–77	61–79	—	69–64	67–72	87–76
6	(France) ESBVA-LM	14	5	9	904	990	−86	19	Transfer to EuroCup Women	57–63	73–83	59–72	64–55	76–62	—	65–60	81–71
7	(Poland) CCC Polkowice	14	3	11	952	1041	−89	17	Eliminated	70–98	70–73	51–61	71–66	77–86	61–69	—	80–66
8	(Belgium) Castors Braine	14	3	11	949	1044	−95	17	Eliminated	60–72	61–66	71–75	66–78	71–72	77–61	83–76	—

Source: FIBA.com

=== Group B ===
Pos	Team	Pld	W	L	PF	PA	PD	Pts	Qualification	YAK	EKA	FEN	FAM	AVE	NAD	WIS	BLM
1	(Turkey) Yakın Doğu Üniversitesi	14	12	2	1085	931	+154	26	Advance to quarterfinals	—	70–79	72–61	67–64	80–56	93–71	87–59	81–61
2	(Russia) UMMC Ekaterinburg	14	11	3	1057	842	+215	25	Advance to quarterfinals	82–77	—	71–73	64–50	60–50	96–53	79–68	100–46
3	(Turkey) Fenerbahçe	14	10	4	986	959	+27	24	Advance to quarterfinals	65–76	80–77	—	83–77	68–56	67–61	87–78	79–63
4	(Italy) Famila Schio	14	7	7	914	879	+35	21	Advance to quarterfinals	65–72	55–68	62–49	—	60–50	78–64	59–68	61–55
5	(Spain) Perfumerías Avenida	14	7	7	846	834	+12	21	Transfer to EuroCup Women	62–67	56–43	65–64	65–58	—	67–58	62–57	64–34
6	(Russia) Nadezhda Orenburg	14	4	10	935	1017	−82	18	Transfer to EuroCup Women	76–81	54–64	64–66	46–76	89–78	—	67–61	100–56
7	(Poland) Wisła Can-Pack	14	4	10	928	974	−46	18	Eliminated	74–82	49–74	62–68	72–74	52–48	58–63	—	85–67
8	(France) Basket Lattes	14	1	13	807	1122	−315	15	Eliminated	56–80	61–100	75–76	56–75	44–67	76–69	57–85	—

Source: FIBA.com

== Quarter-finals ==
Team 1	Series	Team 2	Game 1	Game 2	Game 3
Dynamo Kursk (Russia)	2–0	(Italy) Famila Schio	73–61	73–60	
Sopron Basket (Hungary)	2–1	(Turkey) Fenerbahçe	55–60	78–72	67–46
Yakın Doğu Üniversitesi (Turkey)	2–0	(France) Tango Bourges Basket	83–67	85–66	
UMMC Ekaterinburg (Russia)	2–0	(Czech Republic) ZVVZ USK Praha	97–70	73–54	

=== First leg ===
28 February 2018	UMMC Ekaterinburg (Russia)	97–70 (Series: 1–0)	(Czech Republic) ZVVZ USK Praha	Yekaterinburg
19:00 (UTC+5)	Scoring by quarter: 26–7, 26–19, 23–19, 22–25
	Pts: Moore 29; Rebs: Moore 7 Asts: Toliver, Torrens 7	Boxscore	Pts: Elhotová 17; Rebs: Hanušová, Zahui 5 Asts: Xargay 7	Arena: DIVS Sport Hall; Referees: Juris Kokainis (LAT), Ciprian Stoica (ROU), Özlem Yalman (TUR)

28 February 2018	Dynamo Kursk (Russia)	73–61 (Series: 1–0)	(Italy) Famila Schio	Kursk
19:00 (UTC+3)	Scoring by quarter: 20–15, 20–13, 16–20, 17–13
	Pts: Prince 17; Rebs: Ogwumike 8 Asts: Ogwumike 6	Boxscore	Pts: Yacoubou 16; Rebs: Hruščáková 6 Asts: Yacoubou 4	Arena: Sport Concert Complex; Attendance: 2,000; Referees: Vasiliki Tsaroucha (GRE), Gytis Vilius (LTU), Dariusz Zapolski (POL)

28 February 2018	Sopron Basket (Hungary)	55–60 (Series: 0–1)	(Turkey) Fenerbahçe	Sopron
18:00 (UTC+1)	Scoring by quarter: 13–22, 15–12, 18–17, 9–9
	Pts: Crvendakić 15; Rebs: Turner 7 Asts: Turner 4	Boxscore	Pts: Sottana 18; Rebs: Vaughn 10; Asts: Sottana, Verameyenka 3	Arena: Aréna Sopron; Attendance: 1,400; Referees: Jasmina Juras (SRB), Jelena Tomić (CRO), Ventsislav Velikov (BUL)

28 February 2018	Yakın Doğu Üniversitesi (Turkey)	83–67 (Series: 1–0)	(France) Tango Bourges Basket	Istanbul
20:30 (UTC+3)	Scoring by quarter: 18–16, 20–21, 26–13, 19–17
	Pts: McBride 23; Rebs: Gruda 12; Asts: Vandersloot 13	Boxscore	Pts: Ayayi 20; Rebs: Palau 7 Asts: three players 3	Arena: Caferağa Sports Hall; Attendance: 250; Referees: Marko Vučković (SLO), Andrada Csender (ROU), Gellért Kapitány (HUN)

=== Second leg ===
7 March 2018	Fenerbahçe (Turkey)	72–78 (Series: 1–1)	(Hungary) Sopron Basket	Istanbul
20:30 (UTC+3)	Scoring by quarter: 21–16, 15–20, 22–24, 14–18
	Pts: Vaughn 18; Rebs: Vaughn 8 Asts: Vardarlı 6	Boxscore	Pts: Milovanović 18; Rebs: Coates 8 Asts: Crvendakić 8	Arena: Metro Energy Sports Hall; Referees: Mart Uuehendrik (EST), Erez Gurion (ISR), Ivan Miličević (BIH)

7 March 2018	ZVVZ USK Praha (Czech Republic)	54–73 (Series: 0–2)	(Russia) UMMC Ekaterinburg	Prague
19:00 (UTC+1)	Scoring by quarter: 20–19, 12–19, 8–15, 14–20
	Pts: Xargay 13; Rebs: Režan 9 Asts: Xargay 4	Boxscore	Pts: Meesseman 17; Rebs: Meesseman 11; Asts: Moore 8	Arena: Královka Arena; Attendance: 1,152; Referees: Arnis Ozols (LAT), Luka Kardum (CRO), Dariusz Zapolski (POL)

7 March 2018	Tango Bourges Basket (France)	66–85 (Series: 0–2)	(Turkey) Yakın Doğu Üniversitesi	Bourges
20:00 (UTC+1)	Scoring by quarter: 6–24, 18–19, 17–18, 25–24
	Pts: Hamblin 12; Rebs: Godin, Hamblin 8 Asts: three players 4	Boxscore	Pts: McBride 20; Rebs: Gruda, Lavender 9 Asts: McBride 7	Arena: Palais des sports du Prado; Attendance: 3,910; Referees: Gintaras Vitkauskas (LTU), Michał Proc (POL), Jelena Tomić (CRO)

7 March 2018	Famila Schio (Italy)	60–73 (Series: 0–2)	(Russia) Dynamo Kursk	Schio
20:30 (UTC+1)	Scoring by quarter: 18–14, 19–15, 11–17, 12–27
	Pts: Zandalasini 18; Rebs: Yacoubou 7 Asts: Dotto, Zandalasini 4	Boxscore	Pts: McCoughtry 23; Rebs: Prince 8 Asts: McCoughtry 5	Arena: Pala Campagnola; Attendance: 1,768; Referees: Jasmina Juras (SRB), Sébastien Clivaz (SUI), Özlem Yalman (TUR)

=== Third leg ===
14 March 2018	Sopron Basket (Hungary)	67–46 (Series: 2–1)	(Turkey) Fenerbahçe	Sopron
18:00 (UTC+1)	Scoring by quarter: 17–21, 16–10, 19–12, 15–3
	Pts: Turner 29; Rebs: Crvendakić 7 Asts: three players 3	Boxscore	Pts: Vaughn 13; Rebs: Verameyenka 10; Asts: Sottana, Verameyenka 3	Arena: Aréna Sopron; Attendance: 2,200; Referees: Petr Hrůša (CZE), Marko Vladic (AUT), Dariusz Zapolski (POL)

== Final four ==
Semifinals; 20 April
(Russia) Dynamo Kursk	77
(Russia) UMMC Ekaterinburg	84
(Hungary) Sopron Basket	68
(Turkey) Yakın Doğu Üniversitesi	65

Final; 22 April
(Russia) UMMC Ekaterinburg	72
(Hungary) Sopron Basket	53
Third place
(Russia) Dynamo Kursk	87
(Turkey) Yakın Doğu Üniversitesi	82

=== Semifinals ===
20 April 2018	Dynamo Kursk (Russia)	77–84	(Russia) UMMC Ekaterinburg	Sopron
17:00 (UTC+2)	Scoring by quarter: 21–23, 22–19, 16–27, 18–15
	Pts: McCoughtry 26; Rebs: Ciak 11; Asts: Cruz 5	Boxscore	Pts: Moore 28; Rebs: Meesseman 8 Asts: Moore 5	Arena: Aréna Sopron; Referees: Vasiliki Tsaroucha (GRE), Martin Horozov (BUL), Mārtiņš Kozlovskis (LAT)

20 April 2018	Sopron Basket (Hungary)	68–65	(Turkey) Yakın Doğu Üniversitesi	Sopron
20:00 (UTC+2)	Scoring by quarter: 19–12, 21–18, 16–16, 12–19
	Pts: Turner 19; Rebs: Crvendakić 11; Asts: Turner 4	Boxscore	Pts: Vandersloot 15; Rebs: Lavender 10; Asts: Vandersloot 5	Arena: Aréna Sopron; Referees: Jasmina Juras (SRB), Fernando Calatrava (ESP), Yohan Rosso (FRA)

=== Third place game ===
22 April 2018	Dynamo Kursk (Russia)	87–82	(Turkey) Yakın Doğu Üniversitesi	Sopron
17:00 (UTC+2)	Scoring by quarter: 19–20, 27–24, 29–22, 12–16
	Pts: Petrović 24; Rebs: Vadeeva 7 Asts: Cruz 8	Boxscore	Pts: Eldebrink 21; Rebs: Lavender 9 Asts: Hollingsworth 4	Arena: Aréna Sopron; Referees: Yohan Rosso (FRA), Andrada Csender (ROU), Martin Horozov (BUL)

=== Final ===
22 April 2018	UMMC Ekaterinburg (Russia)	72–53	(Hungary) Sopron Basket	Sopron
20:00 (UTC+2)	Scoring by quarter: 22–15, 20–15, 11–12, 19–11
	Pts: Meesseman 19; Rebs: Meesseman 9 Asts: Moore, Toliver 7	Boxscore	Pts: Turner 21; Rebs: Jovanović, Page 7 Asts: Salvadores 4	Arena: Aréna Sopron; Referees: Jasmina Juras (SRB), Vasiliki Tsaroucha (GRE), Mārtiņš Kozlovskis (LAT)

2017–18 EuroLeague Women Champions

UMMC Ekaterinburg
Fourth title

== Individual statistics ==
=== Points ===
Rank	Name	Team	Games	Points	PPG
1	(United States) Kayla McBride	(Turkey) Yakın Doğu Üniversitesi	18	336	18.7
2	(United States) Brittney Griner	(Russia) UMMC Ekaterinburg	18	305	16.9
3	(Sweden) Amanda Zahui	(Czech Republic) ZVVZ USK Praha	16	268	16.8
4	(Latvia) Anete Šteinberga	(Belgium) Castors Braine	14	217	15.5
5	(Serbia) Sonja Petrović	(Russia) Dynamo Kursk	17	262	15.4

=== Rebounds ===
Rank	Name	Team	Games	Rebounds	RPG
1	(United States) Jantel Lavender	(Turkey) Yakın Doğu Üniversitesi	17	147	8.6
2	(United States) DeWanna Bonner	(Czech Republic) ZVVZ USK Praha	13	112	8.6
3	(France) Sandrine Gruda	(Turkey) Yakın Doğu Üniversitesi	11	92	8.4
4	(United States) Celeste Trahan-Davis	(Belgium) Castors Braine	14	117	8.4
5	(Sweden) Amanda Zahui	(Czech Republic) ZVVZ USK Praha	16	130	8.1

=== Assists ===
Rank	Name	Team	Games	Assists	APG
1	(Hungary) Courtney Vandersloot	(Turkey) Yakın Doğu Üniversitesi	17	153	9.0
2	(Spain) Marta Xargay	(Czech Republic) ZVVZ USK Praha	15	99	6.6
3	(Italy) Francesca Dotto	(Italy) Famila Schio	16	84	5.3
4	(Latvia) Elīna Babkina	(Poland) CCC Polkowice	14	70	5.0
4	(Spain) Anna Cruz	(Russia) Dynamo Kursk	10	50	5.0

=== Other statistics ===
Category	Name	Team	Games	Average
Steals	(France) Olivia Époupa	(Turkey) Galatasaray	14	3.0
Blocks	(United States) Brittney Griner	(Russia) UMMC Ekaterinburg	18	2.3
Turnovers	(Spain) Marta Xargay	(Czech Republic) ZVVZ USK Praha	15	4.3
Fouls committed	(France) Élodie Godin	(France) Tango Bourges Basket	16	3.7
Minutes	(Spain) Marta Xargay	(Czech Republic) ZVVZ USK Praha	15	36:00
2P%	(United States) Crystal Langhorne	(Hungary) Sopron Basket	14	64.9%
3P%	(Serbia) Sonja Petrović	(Russia) Dynamo Kursk	17	55.4%
FT%	(Montenegro) Jelena Dubljević	(Turkey) Galatasaray	13	97.8%
