= Anna Petrakova =

Russian basketball player

Anya Petrakova
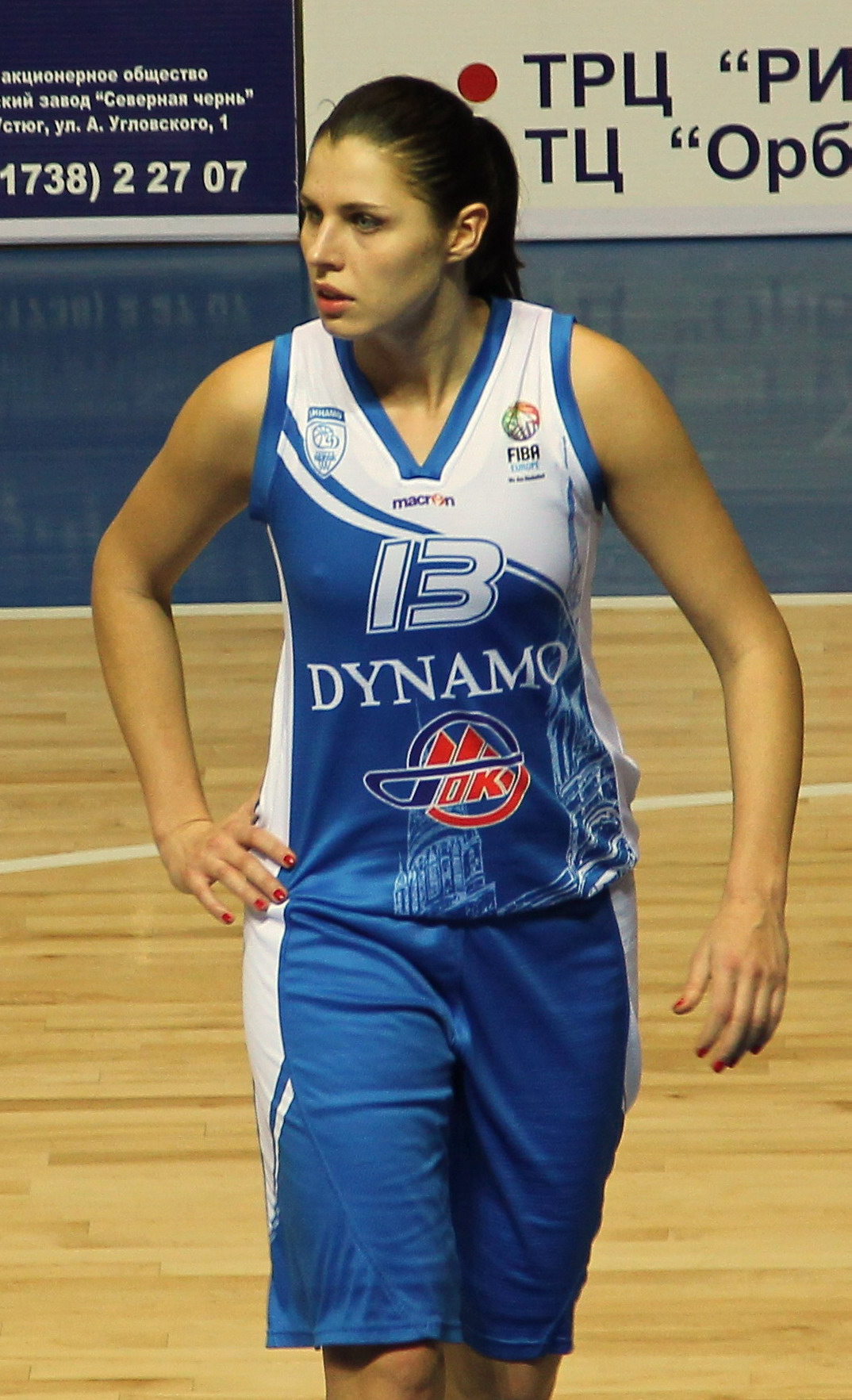
- Petrakova with the Dynamo Kursk in 2012

Personal information
- Born: 4 December 1984 (age 41) Budapest, Hungary
- Listed height: 6 ft 2 in (1.88 m)
- Listed weight: 174 lb (79 kg)

Career information
- College: Louisiana (2001–2005)
- Playing career: 2011–2017
- Position: Power forward

Career history
- 2011–2012: Dynamo Kursk
- 2012–2014: UMMC Ekaterinburg
- 2014–2015: Dynamo Moscow
- 2015–2017: UMMC Ekaterinburg

Career highlights
- 2× EuroLeague champion (2013, 2016); EuroCup Women champion (2012); 2× FIBA Europe SuperCup (2013, 2016); 4× Russian Premier League (2013, 2014, 2016, 2017); 3× Russian Cup (2013, 2014, 2017); Sun Belt Conference Player of the Year (2004); 2× First-team All-Sun Belt Conference (2004, 2005)

Anna "Anya" Viktorovna Petrakova-Parker (Russian: Анна Викторовна Петракова, born 4 December 1984) is a Russian former basketball player. She was part of the Russia women's national basketball team that placed fourth at the 2012 Summer Olympics. She won the 2011–12 EuroCup Women with Dynamo Kursk and the 2012–13 EuroLeague Women and the 2013 FIBA Europe SuperCup Women with UMMC Ekaterinburg.

== College career ==
Petrakova played college basketball for University of Louisiana at Lafayette from 2001 to 2005. She was named to the First-team All-Sun Belt Conference team in 2004 and 2005, and was named the Sun Belt Conference Player of the Year in 2004 after leading the conference in scoring, rebounds and blocked shots. In 2005, she was named to the Sun Belt Conference All-tournament team. In 2018, Petrakova was selected to the Louisiana Athletics Hall of Fame.

== Professional career ==
Following her graduation from Louisiana, Petrakova joined Nur in Kazan, Russia. She later played for several teams, including Spartak, CSKA Moscow, Chevakata, Dynamo Kursk, and UMMC Ekaterinburg. In 2015, she was named the Russian Premier League Player of the Year. She retired following the 2016–2017 season.

== Personal life ==
Petrakova married WNBA player Candace Parker in 2019. Their son, Airr Larry Petrakov Parker, was born in February 2022. Petrakova gave birth to a second son, Hartt Summitt Petrakov Parker, in May 2024.
