= Kayla McBride =

American basketball player (born 1992)

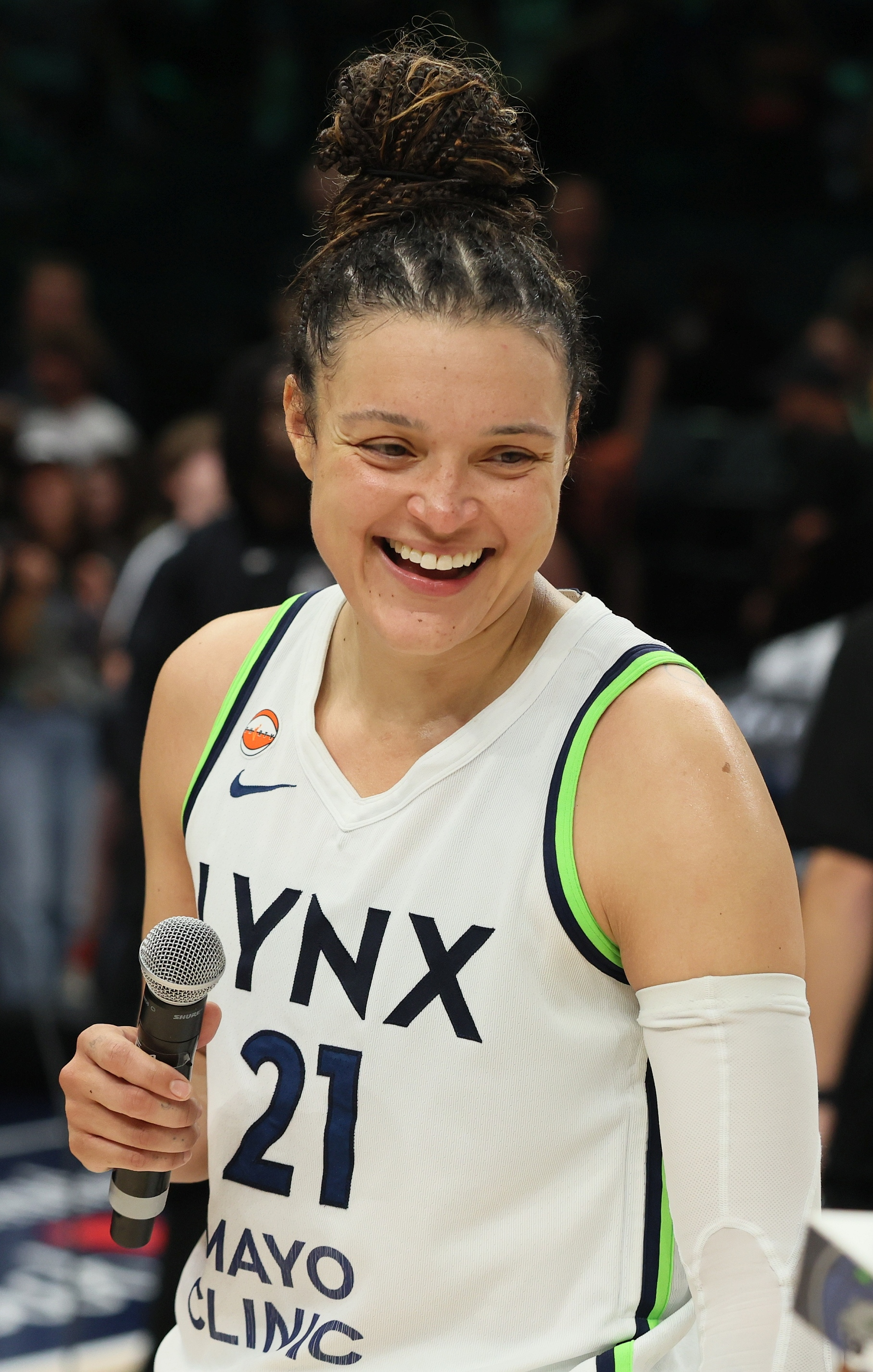
- McBride with the Minnesota Lynx in 2026

No. 21 – Minnesota Lynx
- Position: Shooting guard
- League: WNBA

Personal information
- Born: June 25, 1992 (age 34) Erie, Pennsylvania, U.S.
- Listed height: 5 ft 11 in (1.80 m)
- Listed weight: 179 lb (81 kg)

Career information
- High school: Villa Maria Academy (Erie, Pennsylvania)
- College: Notre Dame (2010–2014)
- WNBA draft: 2014: 1st round, 3rd overall pick
- Drafted by: San Antonio Stars
- Playing career: 2014–present

Career history
- 2014–2020: San Antonio Stars/Las Vegas Aces
- 2014–2015: Uniqa Sopron
- 2015–2016: Nadezhda Orenburg
- 2017–2018: Yakın Doğu Üniversitesi
- 2018–2019: UMMC Ekaterinburg
- 2020–2025: Fenerbahçe
- 2021–present: Minnesota Lynx
- 2025: Laces BC
- 2025–2026: Fenerbahçe

Career highlights
- WNBA Commissioner's Cup Champion (2024); 5× WNBA All-Star (2015, 2018, 2019, 2024, 2025); WNBA All-Rookie Team (2014); Unrivaled First-team all-Unrivaled (2025); 4× EuroLeague champion (2019, 2023, 2024, 2026); Euroleague Final Four MVP (2024); All-EuroLeague Women First Team (2024); 2× FIBA Europe SuperCup Women champion (2018, 2023); EuroCup winner (2017); 3× Triple Crown (2017, 2019, 2024); 7× Turkish Super League champion (2017, 2021, 2022, 2023, 2024, 2025, 2026); 3× Turkish Cup winner (2017, 2024, 2026); 2× Turkish Presidential Cup champion (2017, 2025); Russian League champion (2019); Russian Cup winner (2019); Hungarian League champion (2015); Hungarian Cup winner (2015); First-team All-American – AP, USBWA (2014); Third-team All-American – AP (2013); 2× WBCA Coaches' All-American (2013, 2014); Big East Tournament MOP (2013); First-team All-ACC (2014); First-team All-Big East (2013); McDonald's All-American (2010)
- Stats at WNBA.com
- Stats at Basketball Reference
Medals
Representing United States
FIBA Under-18 Americas Championship
Gold medal – first place	2010 United States	Team

Kayla Renae McBride (born June 25, 1992) is an American professional basketball player for the Minnesota Lynx of the Women's National Basketball Association (WNBA) and for the Phantom of Unrivaled. She was selected third overall by the San Antonio Stars in the 2014 WNBA draft. McBride played shooting guard for Notre Dame, where she led the Fighting Irish to four consecutive Final Fours and three NCAA championship appearances.

== Early life ==
McBride is the daughter of LaMont and LuAnn McBride. McBride has one younger brother, Aaron, and two younger sisters Karlee and Jayden. Her sister Karlee played basketball for Indiana University and her other sister Jayden played a season at Georgetown University before transferring to Appalachian State University.

McBride attended Villa Maria Academy in Erie, Pennsylvania. McBride was a three-year starter and four-year letterwinner at Villa Maria under head coach Scott Dibble, helping Victors to combined record of 106–15 (.876) with two Pennsylvania Class AA state titles (2009, 2010) and a state runner-up finish (2007) in her prep career. In her freshman year in 2006–07, served as top reserve ("sixth man") on Class AA state runner-up squad that went 27–5; she averaged 6.7 ppg., 4.3 rpg., 1.6 spg. and 1.3 apg. with a .740 free throw percentage that season and earned Swin Cash award as Western Pennsylvania's Freshman of the Year in 2007. As a sophomore in 2007–08, sparked top-ranked team in Pennsylvania to 24–5 record while averaging 13.0 ppg., 6.8 rpg., 4.5 apg., 3.1 spg. and shooting .730 from foul line. During her junior year in 2008–09, helped VMA to 27–3 record and state title, while team rose as high as 15th in ESPN Hoopgurlz East Region rankings during season ... posted team highs of 17.3 ppg., 7.8 rpg. and 4.6 apg., along with 3.1 spg. and .820 free throw percentage. As a senior in 2009–10, led Villa Maria to a 28–2 record and its second consecutive state championship ... averaged 20.5 ppg., 11.8 rpg. and 5.6 spg., including 29 points and 11 rebounds in Class AA state final against York Catholic. She was named the District 10 Player of the Year and Pennsylvania Class AA Player of the Year in 2009 and 2010. McBride was the Pennsylvania Gatorade Player of the Year in 2010. McBride owns school records (boys or girls) in career points (1,727), rebounds (931), assists (474), steals (420) and blocked shots (191).

== College career ==
=== Freshman season (2010–2011) ===
McBride went to the University of Notre Dame to play basketball. As a freshman, she had to sit out half of the season because of academic issues. She watched from the sidelines as her team lost to Texas A&M in the 2011 NCAA Championship. That season she appeared in 19 games, starting in 4. McBride averaged 8.7 points, 3.3 rebounds, and shot .557 from the field, the third highest on her team. They ended the season with a 31–8 record.

=== Sophomore season (2011–2012) ===
Her sophomore season she appeared in all 39 games, and started in 36 of those 39 games. In her sophomore year she ranked fourth on the team with a .496 field goal percentage, fourth on the team in scoring, averaging 11.6 points per game, and won the Big East regular-season free throw percentage crown, with a free throw percentage of .919. The Fighting Irish again appeared in the championship, and again, they lost, but this time to Baylor. During that game McBride scored 11 points.

=== Junior season (2012–2013) ===
Again, she played all 37 games, and started in 36 games. McBride averaged 15.9 points, 4.6 rebounds, and 2.4 assists per game. She led the league in free throw percentage, and almost tied ninth in the country but was two made foul shots shy of the minimum to qualify for the national ranking. Her field goal percentage was .453 that season, her lowest yet. Notre Dame went to the Final Four for the third time in a row, but they lost to UConn.

=== Senior season (2013–2014) ===
McBride started in all 38 games. She averaged career highs of 17.6 points, 5.3 rebounds, and 3.8 assists per game. The Fighting Irish went undefeated, until during the championship game against Connecticut, who was also undefeated because both teams were in a different conference (with Notre Dame in the ACC conference), it was the first time the two teams had met that season. It was McBride's last chance to win a college championship. But Notre Dame lost in the second half, with the final score being 79–58. McBride contributed 21 points and 5 rebounds to her last game as a collegiate athlete.

=== College statistics ===
Legend
GP	Games played	GS	Games started	MPG	Minutes per game
FG%	Field goal percentage	3P%	3-point field goal percentage	FT%	Free throw percentage
RPG	Rebounds per game	APG	Assists per game	SPG	Steals per game
BPG	Blocks per game	PPG	Points per game	**Bold**	Career high

Year	Team	GP	Points	FG%	3P%	FT%	RPG	APG	SPG	BPG	PPG
2010–11	Notre Dame	19	165	**55.7**	23.5	86.2	3.3	1.5	0.9	0.2	8.7
2011–12	Notre Dame	**39**	452	49.6	**38.0**	87.2	4.6	1.7	**1.5**	0.1	11.6
2012–13	Notre Dame	37	590	45.3	31.7	**90.0**	4.6	2.4	**1.5**	0.2	15.9
2013–14	Notre Dame	38	**669**	46.5	36.6	88.0	**5.3**	**3.8**	1.3	0.2	**17.6**
Career	Notre Dame	133	1876	47.5	34.5	88.2	4.6	2.5	1.4	0.2	14.1

== WNBA ==
=== San Antonio Stars (2014–2017) ===
In the 2014 WNBA draft, McBride was drafted third overall by the San Antonio Stars. She started all 34 games for the Stars in her rookie season, leading the Stars in scoring, averaging 13.0 ppg, which also ranked third among rookies in the WNBA. She was one of three unanimous selections to the WNBA All-Rookie Team and finished third in Rookie of the Year voting. McBride scored in double-figures in 21 games, including two 30-point performances, while recording the most points by a Stars rookie (442) since the team relocated to San Antonio. She set career highs in assists (6) and steals (5), while scoring 15 points at Tulsa (7/17). The Stars achieved a playoff berth and finished third place in the Western Conference but were eliminated by the Minnesota Lynx in a 2-game sweep during the first round. McBride led the Stars in scoring during the postseason (22.5 ppg), while scoring a team-high 20 points in Game 1 of the Western Conference Semifinals and 25 points in Game 2.

In her second season, McBride was voted into the 2015 WNBA All-Star Game, and finished the season, averaging 13.8 ppg, but the Stars didn't make the playoffs this time.

In the 2016 season, McBride would continue to improve, but suffered a right foot injury on July 2 against the Minnesota Lynx. She was ruled out for the remainder of the season and finished with a career-high of 17.1 ppg.

In the 2017 season, McBride would return healthy and play 30 games with 29 starts, averaging 15.4 ppg. On August 1, 2017, McBride scored a career-high 31 points in a 93–81 win over the New York Liberty. The Stars finished with a league worst 8–26 record.

=== Las Vegas Aces (2018–2020) ===
In 2018, the Stars relocated to Las Vegas, Nevada and were renamed the Las Vegas Aces. In March 2018, McBride re-signed with the Aces to a multi-year deal in free agency. In 2018, McBride had the best season of her career thus far. On June 28, 2018, McBride scored a new career-high of 38 points in a 97–91 loss to Dallas Wings. McBride would be an all-star for the second time in her career as she was voted into the 2018 WNBA All-Star Game. By the end of the season, McBride averaged a new career-high in scoring, this performance along with rookie sensation A'ja Wilson would almost lead the Aces back in the playoffs but they fell short finishing 9th place in the league with a 14–20 record.

In 2019, the Aces had a much improved season and finished with a 21–13 record as the number 4 seed, receiving a bye to the second round under the league's new playoff format, bringing the franchise back to the playoffs for the first time since 2014. McBride was voted into the 2019 WNBA All-Star Game, making it her fourth all-star appearance. In the second round elimination game, the Aces would defeat the Chicago Sky 93-92 off a game winning half-court shot by teammate Dearica Hamby. However, in the semi-finals, the Aces would lose to the Washington Mystics in four games.

In 2020, the season was delayed and shortened to 22 games in a bubble due to the COVID-19 pandemic. McBride played and started in all 22 games, the Aces finished 18–4 with the number 1 seed, receiving a double bye to the semi-finals. In the semi-finals, the Aces would advance to the Finals after defeating the Connecticut Sun in a hard-fought five-game series but would end up getting swept by the Seattle Storm.

=== Minnesota Lynx (2021–present) ===
In 2021, McBride became an unrestricted free agent and signed with the Minnesota Lynx. As of July 14, 2024, McBride became the 10th WNBA player on the list of all-time league leaders for 3 pointers. In 2024, McBride was selected for her fourth WNBA All-Star game and her first with the Lynx. McBride said "This is the most proud [selection] that I think I've ever had just because of everything we've been through with the Lynx organization." She has also said in 2024 that "I've talked about it since I've been here, Minnesota has been such a saving grace for me and my career...I felt really lost when I was leaving Vegas … and I found a home here very quickly." In the August 24, 2024, Minnesota Lynx game against the Indiana Fever, McBride became "the 10th player in WNBA history with 600+ regular season made" three-point shots, doing so in 326 games, the third-fastest after Diana Taurasi and Katie Smith. In the September 13, 2024, game against the Chicago Sky, McBride became the first Lynx player in franchise history to make 100+ 3-point shots in a single season. In April 2026, it was announced that she had been re-signed by the Lynx on a two-year deal. In the June 17, 2026, game against Los Angeles, McBride surpassed Tina Thompson for the 5th place spot on the list of WNBA players with the most all-time three pointers made (with 749). McBride was named the Western Conference Player of the Week for games played from July 13-19, 2026. In the August 9, 2026, Lynx home game against the Dallas Wings, McBride set a league record for the most 3-pointers in a single game by making 10. She also set a new career high for herself by scoring 43 points in the game. McBride was named the Western Conference Player of the Week for August 3-9, 2026, her second such award of the 2026 season.

== Overseas ==
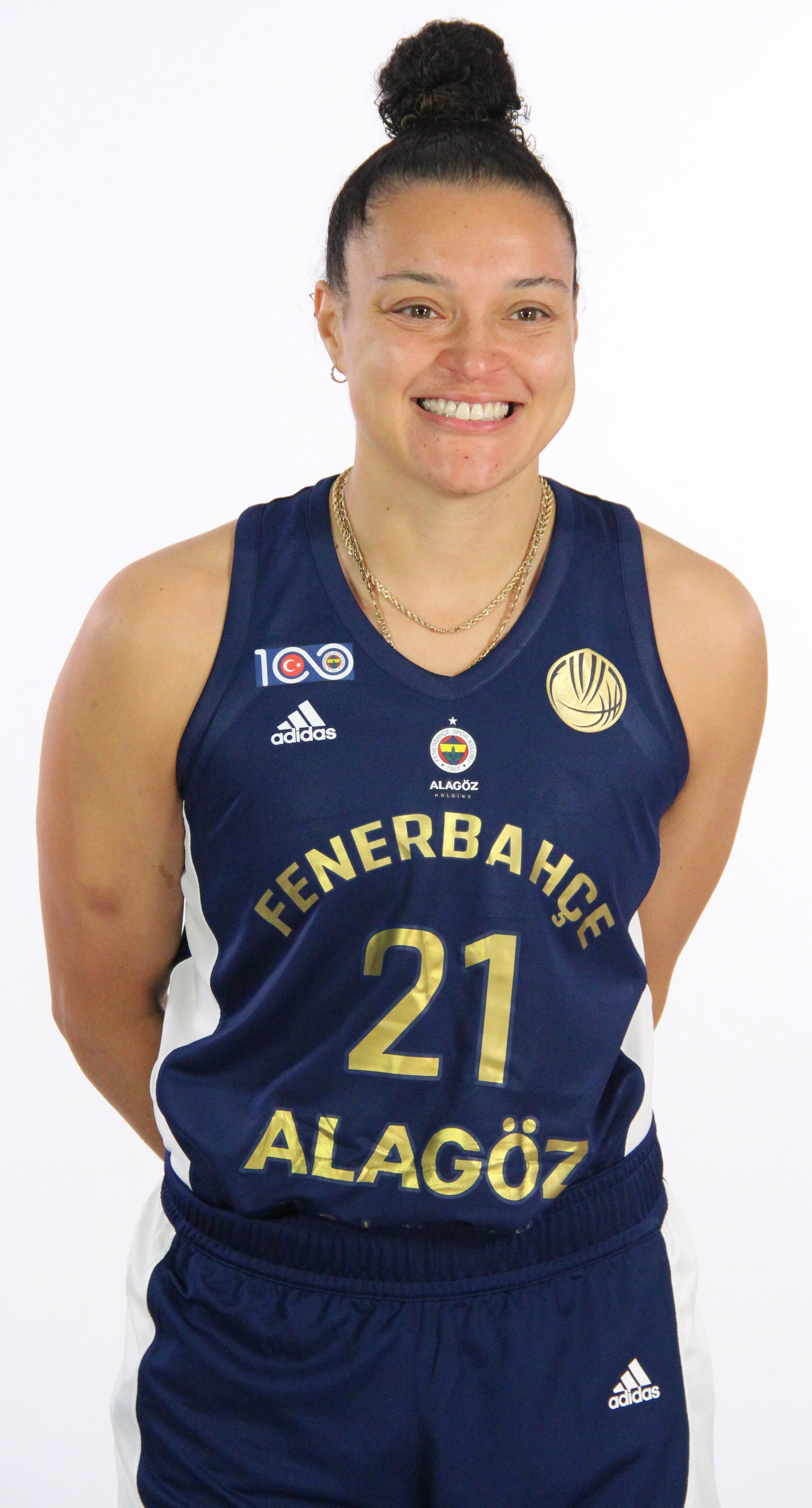
McBride in 2023 with Fenerbahçe

In the 2014–15 off-season, McBride played in Hungary for Uniqa Sopron. In the 2015–16 off-season, McBride played in Russia for Nadezhda Orenburg. As of November 2016, it was confirmed that McBride is playing in Turkey for Yakın Doğu Üniversitesi for the 2016–17 off-season. In 2017, McBride resigned with Yakın Doğu Üniversitesi for the 2017–18 off-season. In 2018, she signed with UMMC Ekaterinburg of the Russian League for the 2018-19 off-season.

=== Fenerbahçe (since 2020) ===
McBride signed with Fenerbahçe for the 2020–21 season. At the end of the season, she extended her contract with Fenerbahçe for two more years. In 2020-21, Fenerbahçe won the bronze medal by ending in third place in EuroLeague Women by beating Sopron Basket 64-58 in the third-place playoff with a double-double from Kayla McBride but Sopron Basket reversed the outcome in 2021-22 so that Fenerbahçe ended the season as silver medalists after Sopron Basket defeated Fenerbahçe 60-55 in the final. After losing 2022 final, she won 2023 and 2024 EuroLeague Women championships with the team and earn 2024 EuroLeague Women Final 4 MVP award. In February 2025, Fenerbahçe announced that McBride would rejoin Fenerbahçe from March until the end of the season.

== Unrivaled ==
On August 14, 2024, it was announced that McBride would appear and play in the inaugural season of Unrivaled, a new women's 3-on-3 basketball league founded by Napheesa Collier and Breanna Stewart. She played for the Laces in the 2025 season. On July 7, 2026, Unrivaled announced McBride had signed a multiyear deal beginning with a return for their 2027 season.

== Career statistics ==
Legend
GP	Games played	GS	Games started	MPG	Minutes per game	RPG	Rebounds per game
APG	Assists per game	SPG	Steals per game	BPG	Blocks per game	PPG	Points per game
TO	Turnovers per game	FG%	Field-goal percentage	3P%	3-point field-goal percentage	FT%	Free-throw percentage
**Bold**	Career best	°	League leader

Denotes season(s) in which McBride won a EuroLeague championship

=== WNBA ===
==== Regular season ====
Stats current through end of 2025 Regular Season

WNBA regular season statistics
Year	Team	GP	GS	MPG	FG%	3P%	FT%	RPG	APG	SPG	BPG	TO	PPG
2014	San Antonio	34	34	26.0	.406	.396	.846	2.3	1.7	0.9	0.1	1.2	13.0
2015	San Antonio	27	25	28.0	.382	.373	.879	3.1	1.6	1.0	0.1	1.6	13.8
2016	San Antonio	17	17	30.8	.367	.305	.853	4.0	1.9	1.0	0.1	2.0	17.1
2017	San Antonio	30	29	**33.2**	.381	.310	**.925**	4.1	2.6	1.1	**0.2**	1.9	15.4
2018	Las Vegas	31	31	32.3	**.449**	.393	.917	3.9	**3.5**	1.0	0.1	2.0	**18.2**
2019	Las Vegas	34	34	29.1	.425	**.428**	.906	**4.2**	2.6	1.2	0.1	1.7	13.3
2020	Las Vegas	22	22	26.6	.425	.342	.897	2.3	2.4	1.2	0.1	1.4	12.5
2021	Minnesota	32	32	31.6	.433	.379	.910	3.6	2.3	0.8	**0.2**	**1.1**	13.7
2022	Minnesota	31	31	29.8	.405	.356	.909	2.8	2.1	1.0	0.1	1.5	13.3
2023	Minnesota	38	38	31.8	.424	.342	.867	3.2	2.2	1.2	**0.2**	1.7	14.3
2024	Minnesota	**39**	**39**	31.7	.420	.407	.893	2.6	3.2	**1.3**	0.1	2.0	15.0
2025	Minnesota	**39**	**39**	31.3	.416	.395	.905	2.3	**3.5**	**1.3**	0.1	1.7	14.2
**Career**	12 years, 2 teams	374	371	30.3	.412	.373	.896	3.2	2.5	1.1	0.1	1.7	14.4
**Career**	All-Star	5	1	19.6	.361	.310	1.000	2.6	1.4	1.2	0.0	0.8	12.0

==== Playoffs ====
WNBA playoff statistics
Year	Team	GP	GS	MPG	FG%	3P%	FT%	RPG	APG	SPG	BPG	TO	PPG
2014	San Antonio	2	2	30.2	**.593**	**.600**	**1.000**	2.5	0.5	1.0	0.0	3.5	**22.5**
2019	Las Vegas	5	5	32.6	.447	.429	.950	3.2	3.0	0.4	0.0	2.2	14.0
2020	Las Vegas	8	8	30.9	.400	.345	**1.000**	3.4	2.9	0.5	0.1	1.4	9.5
2021	Minnesota	1	1	34.0	.538	.571	.500	**7.0**	2.0	0.0	0.0	6.0	19.0
2023	Minnesota	3	3	**39.3**°	.432	.370	**1.000**	6.0	2.7	1.0	0.0	1.7	18.0
2024	Minnesota	**12**°	**12**°	36.5	.441	.382	.900	2.3	**3.8**	1.1	0.0	**1.1**	15.3
2025	Minnesota	6	6	36.8	.466	.476	**1.000**	3.7	2.7	**1.2**	**0.3**	1.2	22.0
**Career**	7 years, 2 teams	37	37	34.6	.452	.415	.946	3.3	3.0	0.8	0.1	1.6	15.4

==== EuroLeague ====
EuroLeague statistics
Year	Team	GP	MPG	PPG	PTS	FGM-FGA	FG%	3PM-3PA	3P%	FTM-FTA	FT%
2017–18	Yakın Doğu Üniversitesi	**18**	32.9	**18.7**	**336**	6.7-14.6	46.2	2.0-5.1	39.6	3.2-3.5	92.1
2018–19	UMMC Ekaterinburg	**18**	29.9	14.1	253	5.2-11.0	47.5	1.9-4.2	**46.7**	1.7-1.9	88.2
2020–21	Fenerbahçe	10	30.8	16.0	160	5.4-13.6	39.7	2.1-5.9	35.6	3.1-3.5	88.6
2021–22	Fenerbahçe	**18**	**33.7**	17.8	321	6.1-12.7	**47.6**	3.1-6.9	44.4	2.7-2.8	**96.0**
2022–23	Fenerbahçe	**18**	32.4	14.3	258	5.1-12.9	39.7	2.4-5.8	42.3	1.7-2.0	83.3
2023–24	Fenerbahçe	17	33.5	17.4	295	5.6-12.2	46.2	3.5-7.5	46.1	2.6-3.1	84.6

== USA Basketball ==
McBride was named to the USA Basketball U18 team. The USA team was one of eight teams from North, South and Central America, along with the Caribbean, invited to participate in the 2010 FIBA Americas U18 Championship For Women, held at the U.S. Olympic Training Center, in Colorado Springs, Colorado. The top finishing team qualify for the 2011 FIBA U19 Women's World Championship. The team was coached by Jennifer Rizzotti. The team won all five games, earning the gold medal for the event, and a place in the 2011 U19 World Championship for women. McBride averaged 8.2 points per games, reaching double-digits in three of the contests. She was third leading on the team with eight steals.

== Business interests ==
In July 2026, McBride announced she would open a coffee shop by September 2026 called 1122 Coffee Company in Concord, NC with her sister, Karlee McBride-Webber. The coffee shop name is based on the address where they grew up, and they plan for the atmosphere to feel like their living room.

== See also ==
- List of WNBA career 3-point scoring leaders
- List of WNBA career free throw percentage leaders
