= 2017–18 EuroCup Women =

EuroCup Women
- Season: 2017–18
- Dates: 20 September 2017 – 18 April 2018
- Teams: 40+4 (competition proper); 42+4 (total)

Finals
- Champions: (Turkey) Galatasaray
- Runners-up: (Italy) Reyer Venezia

The 2017–18 EuroCup Women is the sixteenth edition of FIBA Europe's second-tier international competition for women's basketball clubs under such name.

== Teams ==
Teams were confirmed by FIBA Europe on 27 June 2017.

Quarterfinals
| (Turkey) Galatasaray (EL RS) | (France) ESBVA-LM (EL RS) | (Spain) Perfumerías Avenida (EL RS) | (Russia) Nadezhda Orenburg (EL RS) |
Regular season
| Conference 1 | | Conference 2 | |
| (Turkey) Beşiktaş (4th) | (Poland) Energa Toruń (5th) | (Hungary) Cegléd (3rd) | (Italy) Virtus Eirene Ragusa (3rd) |
| (Turkey) AGÜ Spor (5th) | (Poland) AZS PWSZ Gorzów Wielkopolski (6th) | (Hungary) Uni Győr (4th) | (Italy) Umana Reyer Venezia (4th) |
| (Turkey) Hatay BŞB (6th) | (Slovakia) Good Angels Košice (1st) | (Hungary) PEAC-Pécs (5th) | (Germany) TSV 1880 Wasserburg (1st) |
| (Turkey) Mersin BŞB (7th) | (Slovakia) MBK Ruzomberok (3rd) | (Hungary) Aluinvent DVTK Miskolc (6th) | (Germany) Stars Keltern (2nd) |
| (Turkey) İstanbul Üniversitesi (8th) | (Slovakia) Piešťanské Čajky (EL Q, 2nd) | (Hungary) KSC Szekszárd (EL Q, 2nd) | (Czech Republic) Valosun KP Brno (3rd) |
| (Russia) PBC MBA Moscow (6th) | (Romania) ACS Sepsi SIC (1st) | (France) Flammes Carolo Basket (3rd) | (Czech Republic) Basketball Nymburk (4th) |
| (Russia) Sparta&K Moscow Region (8th) | (Greece) Olympiacos (1st) | (France) Basket Landes (6th) | (Belgium) Belfius Namur Capitale (5th) |
| (Russia) Enisey Krasnoyarsk (10th) | (Latvia) TTT Riga (1st) | (France) Nantes Rezé (7th) | (Portugal) G.D.E.S. Santo Andre (1st) |
| (Poland) Ślęza Wrocław (1st) | (Sweden) Umeå Udominate (2nd) | (Spain) Spar CityLift Girona (2nd) | (Switzerland) Elfic Fribourg Basket (2nd) |
| (Poland) Artego Bydgoszcz (4th) | | (Spain) Lointek Gernika Bizkaia (5th) | |
Qualification round
| Conference 1 | | Conference 2 | |
| (Poland) Basket 90 Gdynia (8th) | (Russia) Spartak Noginsk (11th) | (Netherlands) Amsterdam Angels | (France) Saint-Armand Hainaut Basket (8th) |

== Qualification round ==
=== Conference 1 ===
| Team 1 | Agg. | Team 2 | 1st leg | 2nd leg |
|---|---|---|---|---|
| Basket 90 Gdynia (Poland) | 170–134 | (Russia) Spartak Noginsk | 95–55 | 75–79 |

=== Conference 2 ===
| Team 1 | Agg. | Team 2 | 1st leg | 2nd leg |
|---|---|---|---|---|
| Saint-Armand Hainaut Basket (France) | 139–101 | (Netherlands) Amsterdam Angels | 84–48 | 55–53 |

== Group stage ==
Draw for the group stage was made on 4 July 2017 in Munich, Germany.

=== Conference 1 ===
==== Group A ====
| Pos | Team | Pld | W | L | PF | PA | PD | Pts | Qualification | RIG | OLY | GOR | BES |
|---|---|---|---|---|---|---|---|---|---|---|---|---|---|
| 1 | (Latvia) TTT Riga | 6 | 6 | 0 | 461 | 417 | +44 | 12 | Round of 16 | — | 74–70 | 86–85 | 78–52 |
| 2 | (Greece) Olympiacos | 6 | 4 | 2 | 434 | 356 | +78 | 10 | Play-off Round 1 | 72–78 | — | 69–50 | 68–45 |
| 3 | (Poland) AZS AJP Gorzów Wielkopolski | 6 | 1 | 5 | 395 | 450 | −55 | 7 | | 73–79 | 56–85 | — | 71–65 |
| 4 | (Turkey) Beşiktaş | 6 | 1 | 5 | 346 | 413 | −67 | 7 | | 65–66 | 53–70 | 66–60 | — |

Source: FIBA.com
Rules for classification: 1) Points; 2) Head-to-head record; 3) Head-to-head point differential. 4) General point differential 5) Points scored 6) Sum of quotients of points scored and points allowed in each Regular Season game

==== Group B ====
| Pos | Team | Pld | W | L | PF | PA | PD | Pts | Qualification | KOS | MER | ENI | RUZ |
|---|---|---|---|---|---|---|---|---|---|---|---|---|---|
| 1 | (Slovakia) Good Angels Košice | 6 | 5 | 1 | 439 | 393 | +46 | 11 | Round of 16 | — | 89–87 | 77–61 | 61–48 |
| 2 | (Turkey) Mersin | 6 | 4 | 2 | 442 | 397 | +45 | 10 | Play-off Round 1 | 76–70 | — | 69–62 | 54–42 |
| 3 | (Russia) Enisey Krasnoyarsk | 6 | 3 | 3 | 405 | 413 | −8 | 9 | Play-off Round 1 | 65–81 | 75–70 | — | 55–52 |
| 4 | (Slovakia) MBK Ružomberok | 6 | 0 | 6 | 321 | 404 | −83 | 6 | | 56–59 | 59–86 | 64–87 | — |

Source: FIBA.com
Rules for classification: 1) Points; 2) Head-to-head record; 3) Head-to-head point differential. 4) General point differential 5) Points scored 6) Sum of quotients of points scored and points allowed in each Regular Season game

==== Group C ====
| Pos | Team | Pld | W | L | PF | PA | PD | Pts | Qualification | ART | MBA | UME | SPA |
|---|---|---|---|---|---|---|---|---|---|---|---|---|---|
| 1 | (Poland) Artego Bydgoszcz | 6 | 4 | 2 | 464 | 434 | +30 | 10 | Play-off Round 1 | — | 78–65 | 70–74 | 69–58 |
| 2 | (Russia) MBA Moscow | 6 | 3 | 3 | 411 | 437 | −26 | 9 | Play-off Round 1 | 70–87 | — | 76–56 | 70–60 |
| 3 | (Sweden) Umeå Udominate | 6 | 3 | 3 | 435 | 425 | +10 | 9 | Play-off Round 1 | 86–72 | 68–71 | — | 86–57 |
| 4 | (Russia) Spartak&K Moscow Region | 6 | 2 | 4 | 423 | 437 | −14 | 8 | | 81–88 | 88–59 | 79–65 | — |

Source: FIBA.com
Rules for classification: 1) Points; 2) Head-to-head record; 3) Head-to-head point differential. 4) General point differential 5) Points scored 6) Sum of quotients of points scored and points allowed in each Regular Season game

==== Group D ====
| Pos | Team | Pld | W | L | PF | PA | PD | Pts | Qualification | HAT | SEP | TOR | PIE |
|---|---|---|---|---|---|---|---|---|---|---|---|---|---|
| 1 | (Turkey) Hatay | 6 | 6 | 0 | 435 | 356 | +79 | 12 | Round of 16 | — | 73–67 | 66–58 | 82–58 |
| 2 | (Romania) ACS Sepsi SIC | 6 | 2 | 4 | 386 | 397 | −11 | 8 | Play-off Round 1 | 63–80 | — | 71–49 | 64–57 |
| 3 | (Poland) Energa Toruń | 6 | 2 | 4 | 383 | 402 | −19 | 8 | | 53–71 | 84–69 | — | 66–48 |
| 4 | (Slovakia) Piešťanské Čajky | 6 | 2 | 4 | 351 | 400 | −49 | 8 | | 57–63 | 54–52 | 77–73 | — |

Source: FIBA.com
Rules for classification: 1) Points; 2) Head-to-head record; 3) Head-to-head point differential. 4) General point differential 5) Points scored 6) Sum of quotients of points scored and points allowed in each Regular Season game

==== Group E ====
| Pos | Team | Pld | W | L | PF | PA | PD | Pts | Qualification | SLE | GDY | AGU | IST |
|---|---|---|---|---|---|---|---|---|---|---|---|---|---|
| 1 | (Poland) Ślęza Wrocław | 6 | 6 | 0 | 445 | 371 | +74 | 12 | Round of 16 | — | 72–61 | 73–68 | 67–58 |
| 2 | (Poland) Basket 90 Gdynia | 6 | 3 | 3 | 428 | 386 | +42 | 9 | Play-off Round 1 | 59–66 | — | 58–57 | 84–52 |
| 3 | (Turkey) AGÜ Spor | 6 | 2 | 4 | 435 | 405 | +30 | 8 | | 70–72 | 67–62 | — | 99–64 |
| 4 | (Turkey) İstanbul Üniversitesi | 6 | 1 | 5 | 377 | 523 | −146 | 7 | | 55–95 | 72–104 | 76–74 | — |

Source: FIBA.com
Rules for classification: 1) Points; 2) Head-to-head record; 3) Head-to-head point differential. 4) General point differential 5) Points scored 6) Sum of quotients of points scored and points allowed in each Regular Season game

=== Conference 2 ===
==== Group F ====
| Pos | Team | Pld | W | L | PF | PA | PD | Pts | Qualification | CAR | ALU | PEA | KEL |
|---|---|---|---|---|---|---|---|---|---|---|---|---|---|
| 1 | (France) Flammes Carolo Basket | 6 | 6 | 0 | 469 | 361 | +108 | 12 | Round of 16 | — | 88–78 | 82–46 | 79–63 |
| 2 | (Hungary) Aluinvent DVTK Miskolc | 6 | 3 | 3 | 436 | 435 | +1 | 9 | Play-off Round 1 | 58–68 | — | 73–59 | 81–78 |
| 3 | (Hungary) PEAC-Pécs | 6 | 2 | 4 | 381 | 440 | −59 | 8 | | 59–67 | 79–74 | — | 69–67 |
| 4 | (Germany) Stars Keltern | 6 | 1 | 5 | 405 | 455 | −50 | 7 | | 57–85 | 63–72 | 77–69 | — |

Source: FIBA.com
Rules for classification: 1) Points; 2) Head-to-head record; 3) Head-to-head point differential. 4) General point differential 5) Points scored 6) Sum of quotients of points scored and points allowed in each Regular Season game

==== Group G ====
| Pos | Team | Pld | W | L | PF | PA | PD | Pts | Qualification | GIR | LAN | LOI | CEG |
|---|---|---|---|---|---|---|---|---|---|---|---|---|---|
| 1 | (Spain) Spar CityLift Girona | 6 | 5 | 1 | 484 | 369 | +115 | 11 | Round of 16 | — | 78–47 | 81–68 | 86–55 |
| 2 | (France) Basket Landes | 6 | 5 | 1 | 437 | 407 | +30 | 11 | Play-off Round 1 | 88–75 | — | 72–64 | 70–69 |
| 3 | (Spain) Lointek Gernika Bizkaia | 6 | 1 | 5 | 400 | 465 | −65 | 7 | | 57–81 | 62–84 | — | 81–67 |
| 4 | (Hungary) Cegléd | 6 | 1 | 5 | 384 | 464 | −80 | 7 | | 54–83 | 59–76 | 80–68 | — |

Source: FIBA.com
Rules for classification: 1) Points; 2) Head-to-head record; 3) Head-to-head point differential. 4) General point differential 5) Points scored 6) Sum of quotients of points scored and points allowed in each Regular Season game

==== Group H ====
| Pos | Team | Pld | W | L | PF | PA | PD | Pts | Qualification | VIR | SZE | NYM | GDE |
|---|---|---|---|---|---|---|---|---|---|---|---|---|---|
| 1 | (Italy) Virtus Eirene Ragusa | 6 | 6 | 0 | 455 | 344 | +111 | 12 | Round of 16 | — | 72–59 | 79–69 | 76–45 |
| 2 | (Hungary) KSC Szekszárd | 6 | 4 | 2 | 435 | 402 | +33 | 10 | Play-off Round 1 | 56–74 | — | 73–66 | 91–65 |
| 3 | (Czech Republic) Basketball Nymburk | 6 | 1 | 5 | 404 | 451 | −47 | 7 | | 58–74 | 69–86 | — | 80–69 |
| 4 | (Portugal) G.D.E.S. Santo Andre | 6 | 1 | 5 | 362 | 459 | −97 | 7 | | 57–80 | 56–70 | 70–62 | — |

Source: FIBA.com
Rules for classification: 1) Points; 2) Head-to-head record; 3) Head-to-head point differential. 4) General point differential 5) Points scored 6) Sum of quotients of points scored and points allowed in each Regular Season game

==== Group I ====
| Pos | Team | Pld | W | L | PF | PA | PD | Pts | Qualification | VEN | TSV | FRI | BRN |
|---|---|---|---|---|---|---|---|---|---|---|---|---|---|
| 1 | (Italy) Reyer Venezia | 6 | 6 | 0 | 437 | 304 | +133 | 12 | Round of 16 | — | 67–51 | 77–37 | 83–52 |
| 2 | (Germany) TSV 1880 Wasserburg | 6 | 3 | 3 | 394 | 365 | +29 | 9 | Play-off Round 1 | 58–68 | — | 75–58 | 81–62 |
| 3 | (Switzerland) Elfic Fribourg Basket | 6 | 2 | 4 | 360 | 412 | −52 | 8 | Play-off Round 1 | 55–66 | 59–56 | — | 72–52 |
| 4 | (Czech Republic) Valosun KP Brno | 6 | 1 | 5 | 354 | 464 | −110 | 7 | | 51–76 | 51–73 | 86–79 | — |

Source: FIBA.com
Rules for classification: 1) Points; 2) Head-to-head record; 3) Head-to-head point differential. 4) General point differential 5) Points scored 6) Sum of quotients of points scored and points allowed in each Regular Season game

==== Group J ====
| Pos | Team | Pld | W | L | PF | PA | PD | Pts | Qualification | NAM | SAR | GYO | NAN |
|---|---|---|---|---|---|---|---|---|---|---|---|---|---|
| 1 | (Belgium) Namur Capitale | 6 | 4 | 2 | 439 | 407 | +32 | 10 | Play-off Round 1 | — | 75–73 | 62–63 | 77–60 |
| 2 | (France) Saint-Armand Hainaut Basket | 6 | 3 | 3 | 420 | 399 | +21 | 9 | Play-off Round 1 | 80–60 | — | 77–70 | 50–63 |
| 3 | (Hungary) Uni Győr | 6 | 3 | 3 | 407 | 425 | −18 | 9 | Play-off Round 1 | 72–82 | 62–74 | — | 76–70 |
| 4 | (France) Nantes Reze | 6 | 2 | 4 | 381 | 416 | −35 | 8 | | 59–83 | 69–66 | 60–64 | — |

Source: FIBA.com
Rules for classification: 1) Points; 2) Head-to-head record; 3) Head-to-head point differential. 4) General point differential 5) Points scored 6) Sum of quotients of points scored and points allowed in each Regular Season game

=== Ranking of third-placed teams ===
==== Conference 1 ====
| Pos | Grp | Team | Pld | W | L | PF | PA | PD | Pts | Qualification |
|---|---|---|---|---|---|---|---|---|---|---|
| 1 | C | (Sweden) Umeå Udominate | 6 | 3 | 3 | 435 | 425 | +10 | 9 | Play-off Round 1 |
| 2 | B | (Russia) Enisey Krasnoyarsk | 6 | 3 | 3 | 405 | 413 | −8 | 9 | Play-off Round 1 |
| 3 | E | (Turkey) AGÜ Spor | 6 | 2 | 4 | 435 | 405 | +30 | 8 | |
| 4 | D | (Poland) Energa Toruń | 6 | 2 | 4 | 383 | 402 | −19 | 8 | |
| 5 | A | (Poland) AZS AJP Gorzów Wielkopolski | 6 | 1 | 5 | 395 | 450 | −55 | 7 | |

Source: FIBA.com
Rules for classification: 1) Points; 2) Points difference; 3) Points scored.

==== Conference 2 ====
| Pos | Grp | Team | Pld | W | L | PF | PA | PD | Pts | Qualification |
|---|---|---|---|---|---|---|---|---|---|---|
| 1 | J | (Hungary) Uni Győr | 6 | 3 | 3 | 407 | 425 | −18 | 9 | Play-off Round 1 |
| 2 | I | (Switzerland) Elfic Fribourg Basket | 6 | 2 | 4 | 360 | 412 | −52 | 8 | Play-off Round 1 |
| 3 | F | (Hungary) PEAC-Pécs | 6 | 2 | 4 | 381 | 440 | −59 | 8 | |
| 4 | H | (Czech Republic) Basketball Nymburk | 6 | 1 | 5 | 404 | 451 | −47 | 7 | |
| 5 | G | (Spain) Lointek Gernika Bizkaia | 6 | 1 | 5 | 400 | 465 | −65 | 7 | |

Source: FIBA.com
Rules for classification: 1) Points; 2) Points difference; 3) Points scored.

=== Seeding ===
| Seed | Grp | Team | Pld | W | L | PF | PA | PD | Pts | Qualification |
|---|---|---|---|---|---|---|---|---|---|---|
| 1 | I | (Italy) Reyer Venezia | 6 | 6 | 0 | 437 | 304 | +133 | 12 | Round of 16 |
| 2 | H | (Italy) Virtus Eirene Ragusa | 6 | 6 | 0 | 455 | 344 | +111 | 12 | Round of 16 |
| 3 | F | (France) Flammes Carolo Basket | 6 | 6 | 0 | 469 | 361 | +108 | 12 | Round of 16 |
| 4 | D | (Turkey) Hatay | 6 | 6 | 0 | 435 | 356 | +79 | 12 | Round of 16 |
| 5 | E | (Poland) Ślęza Wrocław | 6 | 6 | 0 | 445 | 371 | +74 | 12 | Round of 16 |
| 6 | A | (Latvia) TTT Riga | 6 | 6 | 0 | 461 | 417 | +44 | 12 | Round of 16 |
| 7 | G | (Spain) Spar CityLift Girona | 6 | 5 | 1 | 484 | 369 | +115 | 11 | Round of 16 |
| 8 | B | (Slovakia) Good Angels Košice | 6 | 5 | 1 | 439 | 393 | +46 | 11 | Round of 16 |
| 9 | G | (France) Basket Landes | 6 | 5 | 1 | 437 | 407 | +30 | 11 | Play-off Round 1 |
| 10 | A | (Greece) Olympiacos | 6 | 4 | 2 | 434 | 356 | +78 | 10 | Play-off Round 1 |
| 11 | B | (Turkey) Mersin | 6 | 4 | 2 | 442 | 397 | +45 | 10 | Play-off Round 1 |
| 12 | H | (Hungary) KSC Szekszárd | 6 | 4 | 2 | 435 | 402 | +33 | 10 | Play-off Round 1 |
| 13 | J | (Belgium) Namur Capitale | 6 | 4 | 2 | 439 | 407 | +32 | 10 | Play-off Round 1 |
| 14 | C | (Poland) Artego Bydgoszcz | 6 | 4 | 2 | 464 | 434 | +30 | 10 | Play-off Round 1 |
| 15 | E | (Poland) Basket 90 Gdynia | 6 | 3 | 3 | 428 | 386 | +42 | 9 | Play-off Round 1 |
| 16 | I | (Germany) TSV 1880 Wasserburg | 6 | 3 | 3 | 394 | 365 | +29 | 9 | Play-off Round 1 |
| 17 | J | (France) Saint-Armand Hainaut Basket | 6 | 3 | 3 | 420 | 399 | +21 | 9 | Play-off Round 1 |
| 18 | C | (Sweden) Umeå Udominate | 6 | 3 | 3 | 435 | 425 | +10 | 9 | Play-off Round 1 |
| 19 | F | (Hungary) Aluinvent DVTK Miskolc | 6 | 3 | 3 | 436 | 435 | +1 | 9 | Play-off Round 1 |
| 20 | B | (Russia) Enisey Krasnoyarsk | 6 | 3 | 3 | 405 | 413 | −8 | 9 | Play-off Round 1 |
| 21 | J | (Hungary) Uni Győr | 6 | 3 | 3 | 407 | 425 | −18 | 9 | Play-off Round 1 |
| 22 | C | (Russia) MBA Moscow | 6 | 3 | 3 | 411 | 437 | −26 | 9 | Play-off Round 1 |
| 23 | D | (Romania) ACS Sepsi SIC | 6 | 2 | 4 | 386 | 397 | −11 | 8 | Play-off Round 1 |
| 24 | I | (Switzerland) Elfic Fribourg Basket | 6 | 2 | 4 | 360 | 412 | −52 | 8 | Play-off Round 1 |

Source: FIBA.com
Rules for classification: 1) Points; 2) Points difference; 3) Points scored.

== Play-off Round 1 ==
| Team 1 | Agg. | Team 2 | 1st leg | 2nd leg |
|---|---|---|---|---|
| Elfic Fribourg Basket (Switzerland) | 121–140 | (France) Basket Landes | 64–71 | 57–69 |
| ACS Sepsi SIC (Romania) | 115–122 | (Greece) Olympiacos | 59–55 | 56–67 |
| MBA Moscow (Russia) | 142–166 | (Turkey) Mersin | 66–81 | 76–85 |
| Uni Győr (Hungary) | 134–156 | (Hungary) KSC Szekszárd | 67–76 | 67–80 |
| Enisey Krasnoyarsk (Russia) | 125–120 | (Belgium) Namur Capitale | 69–58 | 56–62 |
| Aluinvent DVTK Miskolc (Hungary) | 139–161 | (Poland) Artego Bydgoszcz | 68–86 | 71–75 |
| Umeå Udominate (Sweden) | 130–144 | (Poland) Basket 90 Gdynia | 71–67 | 59–77 |
| Saint-Armand Hainaut Basket (France) | 145–108 | (Germany) TSV 1880 Wasserburg | 80–47 | 65–61 |

== Round of 16 ==
| Team 1 | Agg. | Team 2 | 1st leg | 2nd leg |
|---|---|---|---|---|
| Saint-Armand Hainaut Basket (France) | 113–175 | (Italy) Reyer Venezia | 58–87 | 55–88 |
| Basket 90 Gdynia (Poland) | 138–147 | (Italy) Virtus Eirene Ragusa | 72–76 | 66–71 |
| Artego Bydgoszcz (Poland) | 109–167 | (France) Flammes Carolo Basket | 62–83 | 47–84 |
| Enisey Krasnoyarsk (Russia) | 139–142 | (Turkey) Hatay | 65–70 | 74–72 |
| KSC Szekszárd (Hungary) | 156–151 | (Poland) Ślęza Wrocław | 72–77 | 84–74 |
| Mersin (Turkey) | 151–132 | (Latvia) TTT Riga | 88–70 | 63–62 |
| Olympiacos (Greece) | 127–149 | (Spain) Spar CityLift Girona | 65–60 | 62–89 |
| Basket Landes (France) | 113–118 | (Slovakia) Good Angels Košice | 69–55 | 44–63 |

== Round of 8 ==
| Team 1 | Agg. | Team 2 | 1st leg | 2nd leg |
|---|---|---|---|---|
| Good Angels Košice (Slovakia) | 141–152 | (Italy) Reyer Venezia | 68–89 | 73–63 |
| Spar CityLift Girona (Spain) | 163–133 | (Italy) Virtus Eirene Ragusa | 85–61 | 78–72 |
| Mersin (Turkey) | 166–155 | (France) Flammes Carolo Basket | 80–71 | 86–84 |
| KSC Szekszárd (Hungary) | 139–174 | (Turkey) Hatay | 74–76 | 65–98 |

== Quarterfinals ==
| Team 1 | Agg. | Team 2 | 1st leg | 2nd leg |
|---|---|---|---|---|
| Mersin (Turkey) | 138–139 | (Italy) Reyer Venezia | 73–79 | 65–60 |
| Galatasaray (Turkey) | 134–132 | (Spain) Spar CityLift Girona | 62–65 | 72–67 |
| Nadezhda Orenburg (Russia) | 140–176 | (Spain) Perfumerías Avenida | 68–85 | 72–91 |
| ESBVA-LM (France) | 145–156 | (Turkey) Hatay | 74–72 | 71–84 |

== Semifinals ==
| Team 1 | Agg. | Team 2 | 1st leg | 2nd leg |
|---|---|---|---|---|
| Hatay (Turkey) | 131–134 | (Italy) Reyer Venezia | 74–54 | 57–80 |
| Galatasaray (Turkey) | 124–119 | (Spain) Perfumerías Avenida | 69–62 | 55–57 |

== Final ==
| Team 1 | Agg. | Team 2 | 1st leg | 2nd leg |
|---|---|---|---|---|
| Galatasaray (Turkey) | 155–140 | (Italy) Reyer Venezia | 90–68 | 65–72 |

| 11 April 2018 | Galatasaray (Turkey) | 90–68 | (Italy) Reyer Venezia | Istanbul |
| 20:00 (UTC+3) | Scoring by quarter: 25–19, 18–16, 25–12, 22–21 |
| | Pts: Quigley 37; Rebs: Petronytė 12; Asts: Alben 12 | Boxscore | Pts: Williams 21; Rebs: Williams 9 Asts: Williams 5 | Arena: Sinan Erdem Dome; Referees: Jasmina Juras (SRB), Gintaras Vitkauskas (LTU), Ventsislav Velikov (BUL) |

| 18 April 2018 | Reyer Venezia (Italy) | 72–65 (140–155 agg.) | (Turkey) Galatasaray | Venice |
| 20:00 (UTC+2) | Scoring by quarter: 16–20, 22–14, 20–18, 14–13 |
| | Pts: Williams 16; Rebs: Carangelo 8 Asts: Williams 5 | Boxscore | Pts: Davis 21; Rebs: Petronytė 13; Asts: Petronytė 4 | Arena: Palasport Giuseppe Taliercio; Attendance: 2 500; Referees: Andris Aunkrogers (LAT), Janusz Calik (POL), Boris Krejič (SLO) |

2017–18 EuroCup Women Champions

Galatasaray
2nd title

== See also ==
- 2017–18 EuroLeague Women
