= Fenerbahçe Women Euroleague 2010–11 =

The 2010–11 season was the 20th edition of Europe's premier basketball tournament for women - EuroLeague Women since it was rebranded to its current format.

== Group stage ==
=== Group B ===
	Team	Pld	W	L	PF	PA	Diff
1.	(Turkey) Fenerbahçe Istanbul	10	10	0	891	754	137
2.	(Russia) UMMC Ekaterinburg	10	8	2	783	664	119
3.	(Spain) Rivas Ecopolis	10	5	5	738	768	-30
4.	(Hungary) MKB Euroleasing Sopron	10	4	6	768	771	-3
5.	Gospić Croatia Osiguranje	10	2	8	787	889	-102
6.	(Poland) Lotos Gdynia	10	1	9	728	849	-121

== Results ==
Rivas Ecopolis (Spain)	82 – 91	(Turkey) Fenerbahçe Istanbul	October 28, 2010

Fenerbahçe Istanbul (Turkey)	109 – 92	Gospic Croatia	November 3, 2010

Fenerbahçe Istanbul (Turkey)	89 – 72	(Hungary) MKB Euroleasing	November 10, 2010

Fenerbahçe Istanbul (Turkey)	107 – 84	(Poland) Lotos Gdynia	November 17, 2010

UMMC Ekaterinburg (Russia)	67 – 73	(Turkey) Fenerbahçe Istanbul	November 24, 2010

Fenerbahçe Istanbul (Turkey)	79 – 77	(Spain) Rivas Ecopolis	December 1, 2010

Gospic Croatia	60 – 92	(Turkey) Fenerbahçe Istanbul	December 8, 2010

MKB Euroleasing (Hungary)	81 – 92	(Turkey) Fenerbahçe Istanbul	December 15, 2010

Lotos Gdynia (Poland)	64 – 77	(Turkey) Fenerbahçe Istanbul	January 13, 2011

Fenerbahçe Istanbul (Turkey)	82 – 75	(Russia) UMMC Ekaterinburg	January 19, 2011

== Knockout stage ==
=== Round of 16 ===
1 February 2011
20:00

Report

Fenerbahçe Istanbul (Turkey)	77–58	(Turkey) Galatasaray M.P.
Scoring by quarter: 20–18, 16–15, 22–9, 19–26
Pts: Nevriye 24; Rebs: Nevriye 6 Asts: Nevriye 3		Pts: Augustus 19; Rebs: Fowles 7 Asts: Doneeka 4

Caferağa Sport Hall, Istanbul
Attendance: 2,000 (full)
Referees: Branislav Mrdak (SRB), Dragan Kralj (BIH), Evgeny Vetrov (RUS)

4 February 2011
19:30

Report

Galatasaray M.P. (Turkey)	51–73	(Turkey) Fenerbahçe Istanbul
Scoring by quarter: 8-19, 12-21, 8-15, 23-15
Pts: Fowles 14; Rebs: 2 players 6 Asts: Doneeka 3		Pts: 2 players 16; Rebs: Esmeral 7 Asts: Birsel 5

Abdi İpekçi Arena, Istanbul
Attendance: 3,000
Referees: Jaroslav Janac (SVK), Damir Kunosic (BIH), Maka Kupatadze (GEO)

=== Round of 8 ===
22 February 2011
20:30

Fenerbahçe Istanbul (Turkey)	78–86	(Russia) Spartak Moscow Region

Caferağa Sport Hall, Istanbul

25 February 2011
20:30

Spartak Moscow Region (Russia)	74–56	(Turkey) Fenerbahçe Istanbul

Vidnoje Sports Centre, Vidnoye

2 March 2011 (*)
20:30

Fenerbahçe Istanbul (Turkey)	vs.	(Russia) Spartak Moscow Region

Caferağa Sport Hall, Istanbul

(*) if necessary
