= 2009 FIBA Europe SuperCup Women =

Tournament details
- Arena: Vidnoye Sport Palace; Vidnoye, Russia
- Dates: 20 October 2009

Final positions
- Champions: (Russia) Spartak Moscow Region
- Runners-up: (Turkey) Galatasaray

Awards and statistics
- MVP: (Russia) Ilona Korstin
- Top scorer(s): (Latvia) Anete Jēkabsone (16 pts)

The 2009 FIBA Europe SuperCup Women was the first edition of the FIBA Europe SuperCup Women. It was held on 20 October 2009 in Vidnoye Sport Palace, Vidnoye, Russia.

== Time ==
Times are EET (UTC+3).

== Final ==
20 October 2009
18:00

Report

Spartak Moscow Region (Russia)	92–59	(Turkey) Galatasaray
Scoring by quarter: 23:9, 27:14, 17:15, 25:21
Pts: Jēkabsone 16; Rebs: Fauls, Vieru 8 Asts: Lawson, McCarville 5		Pts: Young 15; Rebs: Levchenko 9 Asts: Perkins 5

Vidnoye Sport Palace, Vidnoye
Attendance: 3.000
Referees: Henrykh Bekish (BLR), Jasmina Juras (SRB), Hrachya Rostomyan (ARM)

2009 FIBA Europe SuperCup Women winner

Spartak Moscow Region
1st Title
