= FIBA Europe Young Women's Player of the Year Award =

The FIBA Europe Young Women's Player of the Year Award was an annual Player of the Year (POY) award given by FIBA Europe, the European division of FIBA World, the international governing body of the sport of basketball, to the best female basketball player with European citizenship, aged 22 and under of the year. The inaugural award was given out in the year 2005 to Anete Jēkabsone of Latvia. The award was a calendar year by calendar year award, and was not a season by season award. The vote was decided upon by a panel of basketball experts and also by fan voting.

== Winners ==
Year	Winner	Country	Source
2005	Anete Jēkabsone	Latvia	
2006	Sandrine Gruda	France	
2007	Sonja Petrović	Serbia	
2008	Gintarė Petronytė	Lithuania	
2009	Alba Torrens	Spain	
2010	Nika Barič	Slovenia	
2011	Emma Meesseman	Belgium	
2012	Alina Iagupova	Ukraine	
2013	Astou Ndour	Spain	
2014	Ángela Salvadores	Spain	

== See also ==
- FIBA Europe Women's Player of the Year Award
