= 2017 FIBA Europe SuperCup Women =

Tournament details
- Arena: Sport Concert Complex; Kursk, Russia
- Dates: 5 October 2017

Final positions
- Champions: (Russia) Dynamo Kursk
- Runners-up: (Turkey) Yakın Doğu Üniversitesi

Awards and statistics
- Top scorer(s): (Serbia) Sonja Petrović (20 points)

The 2017 FIBA Europe SuperCup Women was the 7th edition of the FIBA Europe SuperCup Women. It was held on 5 October 2017 at the Sport Concert Complex in Kursk, Russia.

== Time ==
Times are CET (UTC+1).

== Final ==
5 October 2017
19:00

Report

Dynamo Kursk (Russia)	84–73	(Turkey) Yakın Doğu Üniversitesi
Scoring by quarter: 19:14, 21:29, 20:12, 24:18
Pts: Petrović 20; Rebs: Petrović 10; Asts: Cruz 4		Pts: Hollingsworth 19; Rebs: Wauters 7 Asts: Vandersloot 10

Sport Concert Complex, Kursk
Attendance: 3.150
Referees: Sónia Teixeira (POR), Mila Čavara (BIH), Vasiliki Tsaroucha (GRE)

2017 FIBA Europe SuperCup Women winner

Dynamo Kursk
1st Title
