= Alba Torrens =

Spanish basketball player

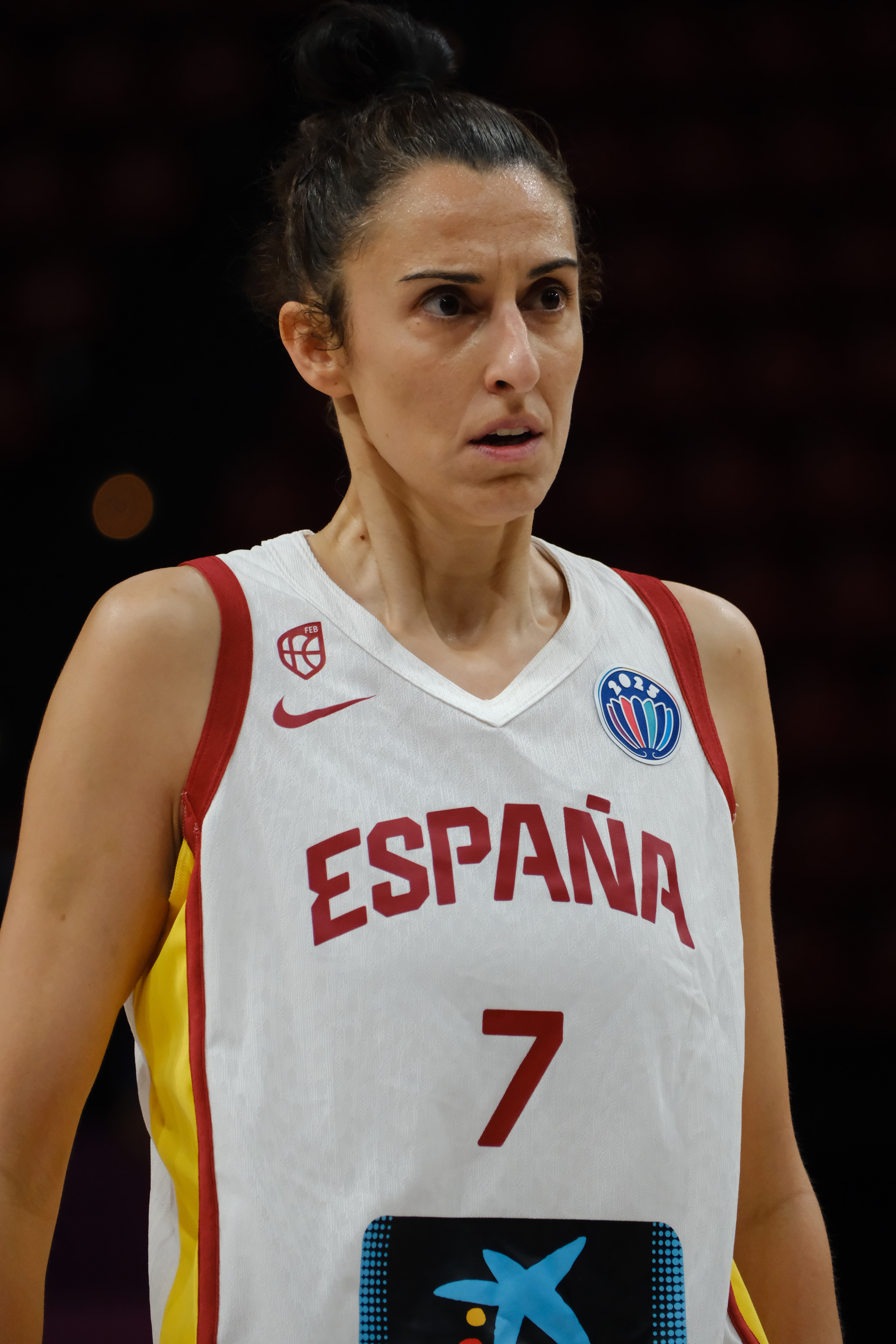
- Torrens, playing for the Spanish senior team in 2025

No. 77 – Azulmarino Mallorca Palma
- Position: Small forward
- League: LF Challenge

Personal information
- Born: 30 August 1989 (age 37) Binissalem, Spain
- Listed height: 6 ft 3 in (1.91 m)
- Listed weight: 176 lb (80 kg)

Career information
- WNBA draft: 2009: 3rd round, 36th overall pick
- Drafted by: Connecticut Sun
- Playing career: 2006–present

Career history
- 2006–2009: Celta Vigo
- 2009–2011: Perfumerías Avenida
- 2011–2014: Galatasaray
- 2014–2022: UMMC Ekaterinburg
- 2022–2025: Valencia Basket
- 2026–present: Azulmarino Mallorca Palma

Career highlights
- 6× EuroLeague champion (2011, 2014, 2016, 2018, 2019, 2021); Europe SuperCup champion (2016); 2× Triple Crown (2014, 2019); Spanish League champion (2011); Turkish League champion (2014); 7× Russian League champion (2015–2021); 3× Turkish Cup champion (2012–2014); 2× Russian Cup champion (2017,2019); FIBA Europe Young Women's Player of the Year Award (2009); 2× EuroLeague Finals MVP (2011, 2014); 2× FIBA Europe Women's Player of the Year (2011, 2014)
- Stats at Basketball Reference

Alba Torrens Salom (born 30 August 1989) is a Spanish female basketball player at the small forward position.

She previously played for UMMC Ekaterinburg. Winner of six EuroLeague titles with three clubs and eight medals with the Spanish senior team, she is considered one of the best European players of the 2010s. After the February 2022 Russian invasion of Ukraine, she left the Russian team UMMC Ekaterinburg.

== Club career ==
=== Celta Vigourban, Perfumerias Avenida ===
Torrens started playing basketball in clubs in her native Balearic Islands before moving in 2003 to Segle XXI, where young talents are developed. She made her debut in the Spanish top-tier league with Celta Vigourban in the 2007–08 season. Perfumerías Avenida was her clubs for the next two seasons, winning the Spanish league and the Euroleague in 2011 under coach Lucas Mondelo. Despite being picked by the Connecticut Sun in the 2009 WNBA draft, she has repeatedly refused to join the WNBA because of the commitment to the national team.

=== Galatasaray ===
She left Spain at the age of 22, having already been named the best female basketball player in Europe. She then spent three seasons at Galatasaray, and eight at Yekaterinburg, earning six European champion awards.

She moved abroad in 2011 to play for Galatasaray S.K., winning one League, three Cups and her second Euroleague in 2014.

She was Euroleague MVP in 2011 and 2014, and Best Player in Europe in 2011 and 2014.

=== UMMC Ekaterinburg ===
Joining the Russian team UMMC Ekaterinburg in 2014, she won three EuroLeague Women titles in 2016, 2018, 2019 and 2021, as well as two Russian Cup and seven Russian Leagues.

With a sixth winners' medal in 2021, she equaled the modern-era record for EuroLeague Women titles, drawing even with Diana Taurasi and Natalia Vieru. By May 2022 she had titles from 3 European Super Cups, 1 League and 1 Super Cup in Spain, 1 League, 3 Cups and a Super Cup in Turkey and 7 Leagues and 2 Cups in Russia. In her last season with Ekaterinburg, she averaged "10.8 points, 5.2 rebounds, 4.5 assists and a PIR of 14.3." After the February 2022 Russian invasion of Ukraine, she left the team.

=== Olympics ===
Playing for Spain, by early 2022 she held 8 medals: two gold (Eurobasket 2013 and 2017), two silver (World Cup 2014 and Olympic Games 2016) and four bronze (Eurobasket 2009 and 2015 and World Cup 2010 and 2018).

In 2016, she scored 32 points over China in the Rio Olympics, leading Spain to a 89-68 win. In the Euroleague, she was named Eurobasket MVP in 2017.

In July 2021, in a matchup of Olympic medalists at the Rio Olympics, TSN reported that Torrens had scored 25 points in a win over Serbia, leading the Spanish team.

Torrens also competed at the 2024 Summer Olympics.

=== Valencia Basket ===
In the summer of 2022, she signed with Valencia Basket, becoming captain of the Spanish team and a power forward after eleven years abroad. The club announced the hire in May 2022.

=== EuroLeague statistics ===
Euroleague winner

Season	Team	GP	MPP	PPP	RPP	APP
2009–10	(Spain) Halcón Avenida	15	24.4	7.5	3.4	2.4
2010–11	(Spain) Halcón Avenida	16	28.0	15.8	4.2	2.3
2011–12	(Turkey) Galatasaray S.K.	9	25.1	14.7	2.8	2.3
2012–13	(Turkey) Galatasaray S.K.	12	17.7	6.4	2.0	1.1
2013–14	(Turkey) Galatasaray S.K.	17	29.4	13.7	3.8	2.8
2014–15	(Russia) UMMC Ekaterinburg	16	23.0	9.7	3.6	3.1
2015–16	(Russia) UMMC Ekaterinburg	16	21.8	8.4	3.6	2.5
2016–17	(Russia) UMMC Ekaterinburg	18	19.5	8.3	2.6	2.9
2017–18	(Russia) UMMC Ekaterinburg	18	27.5	9.4	7.0	3.3
2018–19	(Russia) UMMC Ekaterinburg	16	25.3	9.6	5.7	3.7
2019–20	(Russia) UMMC Ekaterinburg	5	16.7	6.2	2.2	3.2
2020–21	(Russia) UMMC Ekaterinburg	10	22.2	9.9	4.1	4.1
2021–22	(Russia) UMMC Ekaterinburg					

== National team ==
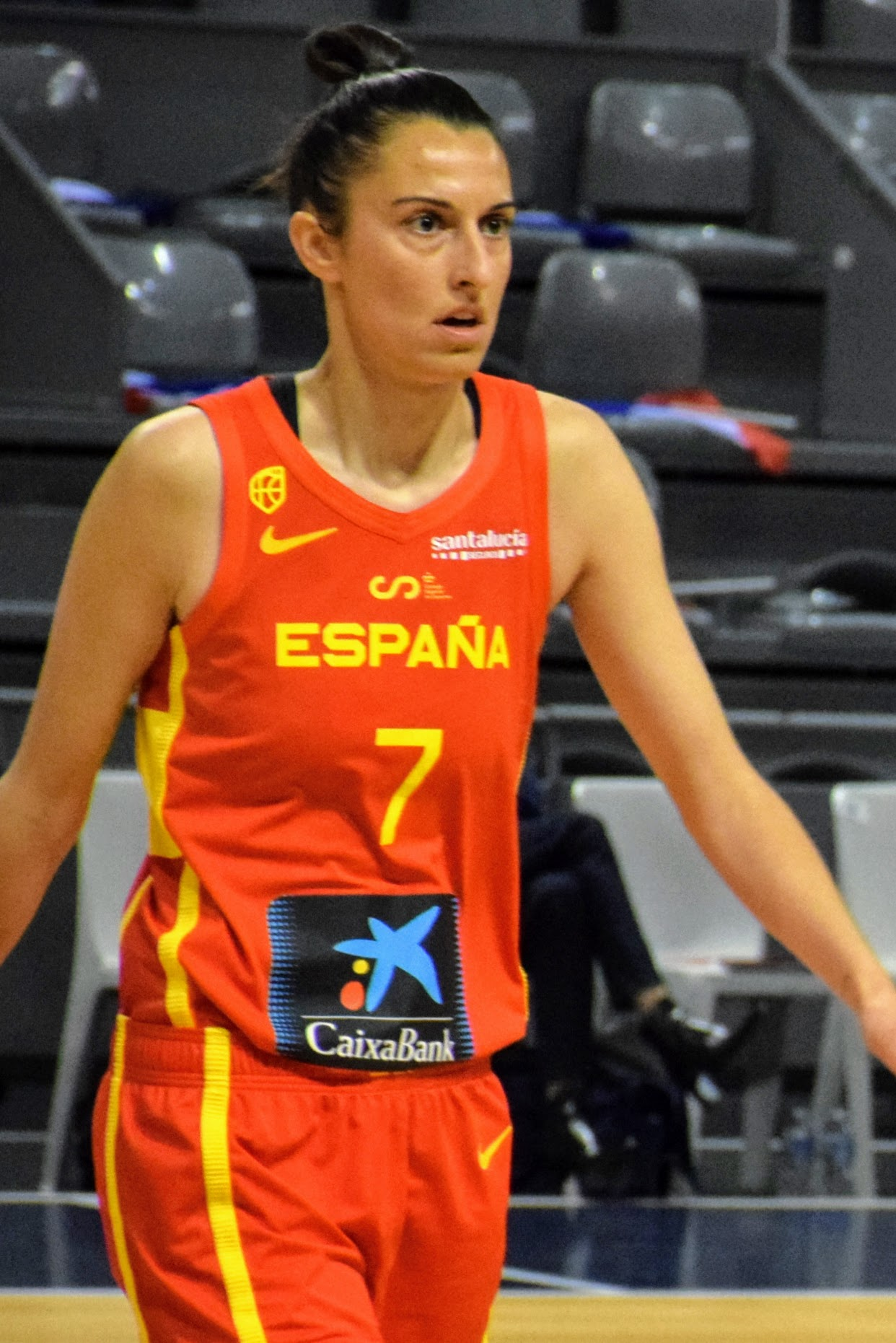
Torrens, playing for the Spanish senior team in 2021

Torrens started playing with Spain's youth teams at 14, winning a total of five medals from 2004 to 2009. She made her debut with the senior team in 2008, and went to play with the 2008 Summer Olympics when she was 18 years old. Up to 2026, she had 222 caps with 12 PPG:

- 2004 FIBA Europe Under-16 Championship (youth) (MVP)
- 2005 FIBA Europe Under-16 Championship (youth)
- 2006 FIBA Europe Under-18 Championship (youth)
- 2007 FIBA Europe Under-18 Championship (youth)
- 4th 2007 FIBA Under-19 World Championship (youth)
- 2009 FIBA Europe Under-20 Championship (youth) (MVP)
- 5th 2008 Summer Olympics
- 2009 Eurobasket
- 2010 World Championship
- 9th 2011 Eurobasket
- 2013 Eurobasket
- 2014 World Championship
- 2015 Eurobasket
- 2016 Summer Olympics
- 2017 Eurobasket (MVP)
- 2018 World Championship
- 6th 2020 Summer Olympics
- 2023 Eurobasket
- 5th 2024 Summer Olympics
- 2025 Eurobasket

== Individual awards and accomplishments ==
- FIBA Europe Young Women's Player of the Year Award: 2009
- FIBA Europe Women's Player of the Year: 2011, 2014
- EuroLeague Final Four MVP: 2011, 2014
- EuroBasket Women MVP: 2017
- 3x EuroBasket All-Tournament Team: 2013, 2015, 2017
