= 2010 FIBA Europe SuperCup Women =

Tournament details
- Arena: Maroussi Arena; Marousi, Greece
- Dates: 18 October 2010

Final positions
- Champions: (Russia) Spartak Moscow Region
- Runners-up: (Greece) Athinaikos

Awards and statistics
- MVP: (Bulgaria) Noelle Quinn
- Top scorer(s): (Bulgaria) Noelle Quinn (18 pts)

The 2010 FIBA Europe SuperCup Women was the second edition of the FIBA Europe SuperCup Women. It was held on 18 October 2010 at the Maroussi Arena in Marousi, Greece.

== Time ==
Times are CET (UTC+1).

== Final ==
18 October 2010
19:00

Report

Athinaikos (Greece)	61–70	(Russia) Spartak Moscow Region
Scoring by quarter: 14:18, 12:23, 20:17, 15:12
Pts: Sōtīriou, Kalentzou 12; Rebs: Sōtīriou 7 Asts: Lymoura 3		Pts: Quinn 18; Rebs: Osipova 11; Asts: Quinn 6

Maroussi Arena, Marousi
Attendance: 800
Referees: Anna Cardus (ESP), Maja Vukanović (SRB), Maka Kupatadze (GEO)

2010 FIBA Europe SuperCup Women winner

Spartak Moscow Region
2nd Title
