= FIBA Europe Women's Player of the Year Award =

The FIBA Europe Women's Player of the Year Award was a yearly Player of the Year (POY) award that has been given out by FIBA's (the international governing body of the sport of basketball) European Division, to the best female basketball player with European citizenship. The inaugural award was given in the year 2005, and was awarded to Maria Stepanova of Russia; whom also won the most awards, having won the award three times. Playing in a FIBA tournament was not a requirement to be eligible to win the award.

The award was a calendar year by calendar year award, and was not a season by season award. The FIBA Europe Women's Player of the Year vote was decided upon by basketball experts and fan voting.

== FIBA Europe Women's Players of the Year ==
This was a calendar year by calendar year award, and not a season by season award, so all teams the player played with during the calendar year are listed.

=== Women's Players of the Year ===
Calendar Year	Women's Players of the Year	Club(s)
2005	(Russia) Maria Stepanova	(Russia) CSKA Samara & (United States) Phoenix Mercury
2006	(Russia) Maria Stepanova (2×)	(Russia) CSKA Samara
2007	(Latvia) Anete Jēkabsone-Žogota	(Russia) Dynamo Moscow
2008	(Russia) Maria Stepanova (3×)	(Russia) CSKA Samara
2009	(France) Sandrine Gruda	(Russia) UMMC Ekaterinburg & (United States) Connecticut Sun
2010	(Czech Republic) Hana Horáková	(Turkey) Fenerbahçe
2011	(Spain) Alba Torrens	(Spain) Perfumerías Avenida & (Turkey) Galatasaray
2012	(France) Céline Dumerc	(France) Bourges
2013	(Spain) Sancho Lyttle	(Turkey) Galatasaray
2014	(Spain) Alba Torrens (2×)	(Russia) UMMC Ekaterinburg

== See also ==
- FIBA Europe Young Women's Player of the Year Award
