= Yakın Doğu Üniversitesi (women's basketball) =

- Nickname: YDÜ Melekleri (NEU Angels)
- Founded: 2012
- Dissolved: 2018
- Arena: Caferağa Sports Hall
- Location: Istanbul, Turkey
- Team colors: White, Maroon
- Head coach: Zafer Kalaycıoğlu
- Championships: 1 EuroCup: 2017; 1 Turkish League: 2017; 1 Turkish Presidential Cup: 2017; 2 Turkish Cup: 2017, 2018

Near East University (Turkish: Yakın Doğu Üniversitesi) is a university in Northern Cyprus. The university's women's basketball team is a Turkish Cypriot team that competes in the Turkish Women's Basketball League and represents Northern Cyprus. The club is based in Istanbul, Turkey.

In 2017, the NEU Angels achieved a continental treble by winning the Turkish League, Turkish Cup and the FIBA EuroCup in an all-Turkish final.

== Roster ==
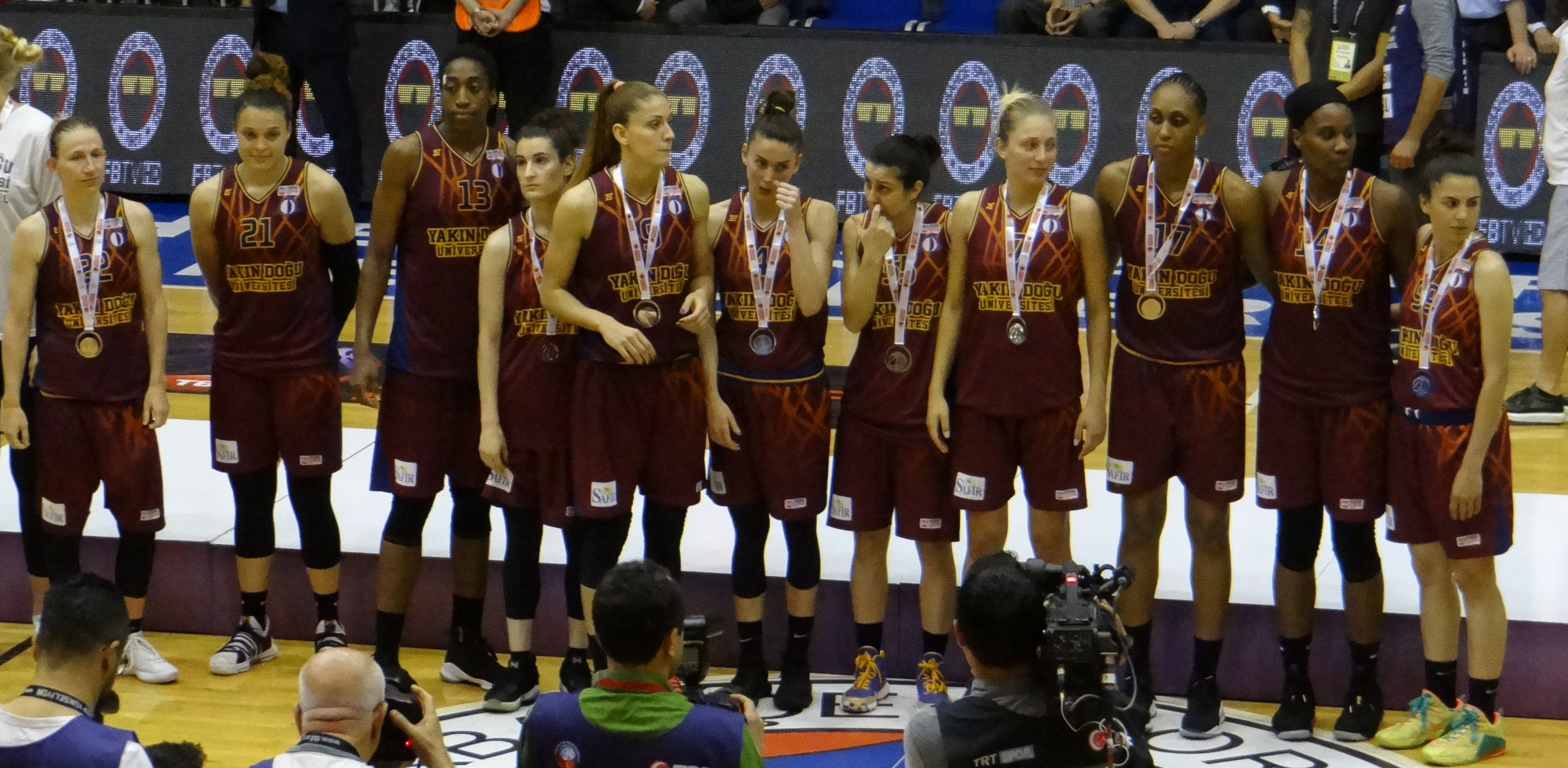
Yakın Doğu Üniversitesi in 2018

Yakın Doğu Üniversitesi 2017–18 roster
Players
Coaches

Pos.	No.	Nat.	Name	Ht.	Age
G	1	(Turkey)	Koç, Emine		20 – 2 February 1998
PG	4	(Turkey)	Çakır, Olcay	1.80 m (5 ft 11 in)	24 – 13 July 1993
SG	6	(Sweden)	Eldebrink, Elin	1.74 m (5 ft 9 in)	30 – 4 January 1988
SF	7	(Turkey)	Köksal, Cansu	1.88 m (6 ft 2 in)	24 – 28 April 1994
F	9	(Turkey)	Çağlar, Bahar	1.91 m (6 ft 3 in)	29 – 28 September 1988
C	12	(Belgium)	Wauters, Ann	1.93 m (6 ft 4 in)	37 – 10 December 1980
C	13	(United States) (Turkey)	Hollingsworth, Quanitra	1.98 m (6 ft 6 in)	29 – 15 November 1988
PF	14	(United States)	Lavender, Jantel	1.93 m (6 ft 4 in)	29 – 12 November 1988
C	17	(France)	Gruda, Sandrine	1.93 m (6 ft 4 in)	30 – 25 June 1987
SG	21	(United States)	McBride, Kayla	1.80 m (5 ft 11 in)	25 – 25 June 1992
PG	22	(United States) (Hungary)	Vandersloot, Courtney	1.73 m (5 ft 8 in)	29 – 8 February 1989
G/F	55	(Turkey)	Doğan, Gökçe	1.78 m (5 ft 10 in)	31 – 13 October 1986
G	99	(Turkey)	Sütcü, Adife		21 – 1 January 1997

Head coach

- (Turkey) Zafer Kalaycıoğlu

Assistant coach(es)

- (Turkey) Emre Vatansever

Team manager

- (Turkey) Erhan Ayaz

Legend

- (C) Team captain
- (DC) Dual citizenship
- Injured

- Roster
Updated: 21 May 2018

== Honours ==
=== European competitions ===
- FIBA EuroCup
  - Winners (1): 2016–17
- FIBA Europe SuperCup
  - Runners-up (1): 2017

=== National competitions ===
- Turkish Women's Basketball League
  - Winners (1): 2016–17
- Turkish Cup
  - Winners (2): 2016–17, 2017–18
- Presidential Cup
  - Winners (1): 2017
