= 2021 FIBA Europe SuperCup Women =

Basketball tournament

Tournament details
- Arena: Font de Sant Lluís; Valencia, Spain
- Dates: 22 October 2021

Final positions
- Champions: (Spain) Valencia Basket
- Runners-up: (Russia) UMMC Ekaterinburg

Awards and statistics
- MVP: (Spain) Cristina Ouviña
- Top scorer(s): (The Bahamas) (Bosnia and Herzegovina) Jonquel Jones (20 pts)

The 2021 FIBA Europe SuperCup Women was the 10th edition of the FIBA Europe SuperCup Women. It was held on 22 October 2021 at the Font de Sant Lluís in Valencia, Spain.

== Final ==
22 October 2021
20:30 (UTC+1)

Boxscore

Valencia Basket (Spain)	75–68	(Russia) UMMC Ekaterinburg
Scoring by quarter: 20:18, 20:16, 18:17, 17:17
Pts: Allen 18; Rebs: Gil 6 Asts: Ouviña 9		Pts: Jones 20; Rebs: Jones 8 Asts: Bentley, Meesseman 4

Font de Sant Lluís, Valencia
Attendance: 3,812
Referees: Viola Györgyi (NOR), Andris Aunkrogers (LAT), Cecília Tóth (HUN)

2021 FIBA Europe SuperCup Women winner

Valencia Basket
1st title
