= 2013 FIBA Europe SuperCup Women =

Tournament details
- Arena: Palace of Sports "Uralochka"; Yekaterinburg, Russia
- Dates: 29 October 2013

Final positions
- Champions: (Russia) UMMC Ekaterinburg
- Runners-up: (Russia) Dynamo Moscow

Awards and statistics
- MVP: (United States) (Russia) Deanna Nolan
- Top scorer(s): (United States) Kristi Toliver (21 pts)

The 2013 FIBA Europe SuperCup Women was the fourth edition of the FIBA Europe SuperCup Women. It was held on 29 October 2013 at the Palace of Sports "Uralochka" in Yekaterinburg, Russia.

== Time ==
Times are CET (UTC+1).

== Final ==
29 October 2013
19:00

Report

UMMC Ekaterinburg (Russia)	72–63	(Russia) Dynamo Moscow
Scoring by quarter: 17:15, 18:11, 22:17, 15:20
Pts: Nolan 15; Rebs: Kobryn 8 Asts: Bird 5		Pts: Toliver 21; Rebs: Vidmer 14; Asts: Toliver 4

Palace of Sports "Uralochka", Yekaterinburg
Attendance: 5.000
Referees: Fabiana Martinescu (ROU), Carole Delauné (FRA), Anne Panther (GER)

2013 FIBA Europe SuperCup Women winner

UMMC Ekaterinburg
1st Title
