= Sandrine Gruda =

French basketball player (born 1987)

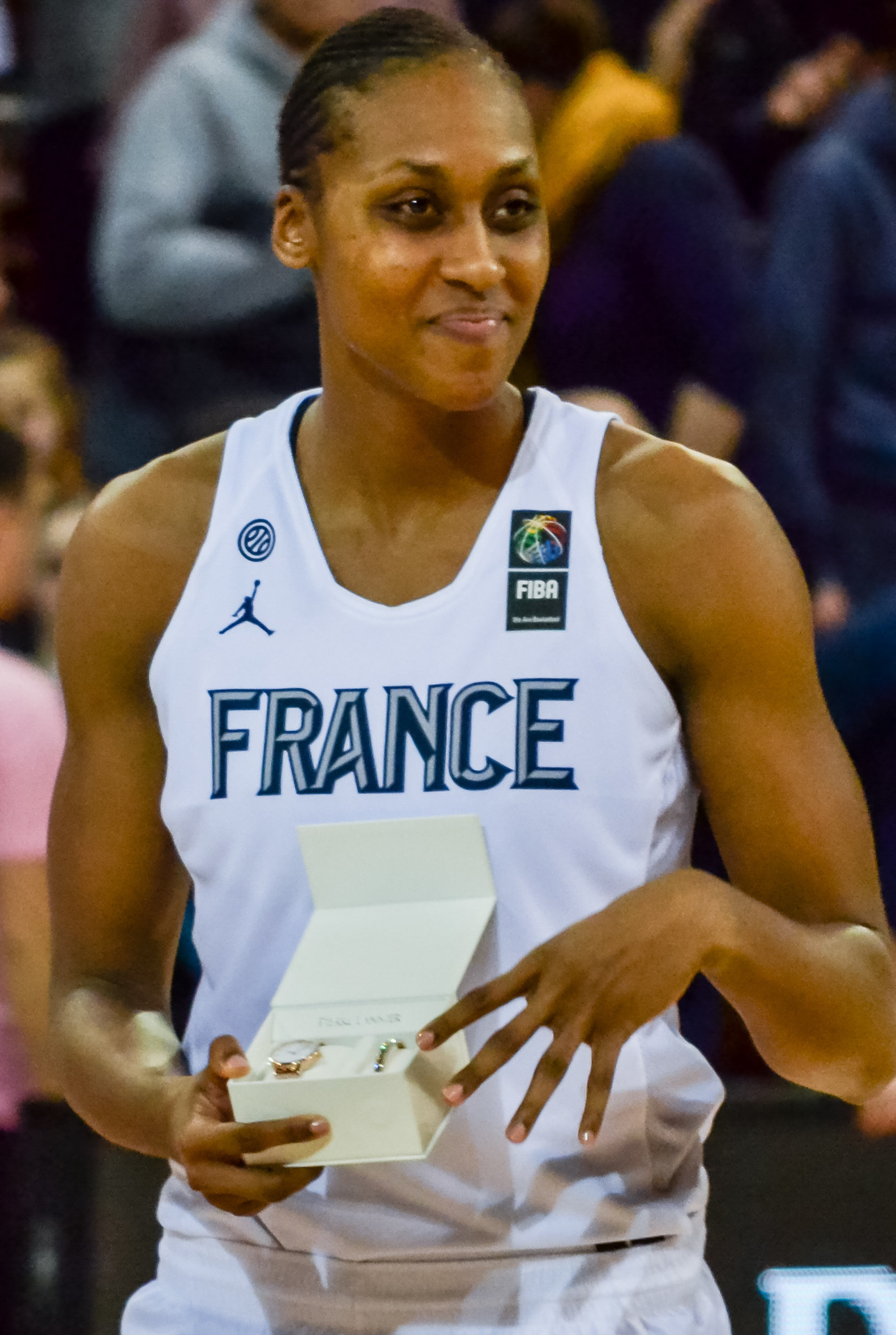
- Gruda in 2016

Personal information
- Born: 25 June 1987 (age 39) Cannes, Provence-Alpes-Côte d'Azur
- Listed height: 6 ft 4 in (1.93 m)
- Listed weight: 185 lb (84 kg)

Career information
- WNBA draft: 2007: 1st round, 13th overall pick
- Drafted by: Connecticut Sun
- Playing career: 2005–2024
- Position: Center
- Number: 7

Career history
- 2005–2007: US Valenciennes
- 2007–2016: UMMC Ekaterinburg
- 2008–2010: Connecticut Sun
- 2014: Los Angeles Sparks
- 2016: Los Angeles Sparks
- 2016–2017: Fenerbahçe Istanbul
- 2017: Los Angeles Sparks
- 2018: Yakın Doğu
- 2018–2022: PF Schio
- 2022–2024: ASVEL Féminin

Career highlights
- WNBA champion (2016); FIBA Europe Women's Player of the Year (2009); FIBA Euroleague All-Star (2007); FIBA MVP World Championship for Youth (2007); 2× MVP Best French Player of the French Championship (2006, 2007); FIBA Europe Young Women’s Player of the Year (2006)
- Stats at WNBA.com
- Stats at Basketball Reference
Medals
Women's basketball
Representing France
Olympic Games
Silver medal – second place	2012 London	Team
Bronze medal – third place	2020 Tokyo	Team
EuroBasket
Gold medal – first place	2009 Latvia
Silver medal – second place	2013 France
Silver medal – second place	2015 Hungary/Romania
Silver medal – second place	2019 Serbia/Latvia
Silver medal – second place	2021 Spain/France
Bronze medal – third place	2011 Poland
Bronze medal – third place	2023 Israel/Slovenia

Sandrine Gruda (born 25 June 1987) is a French former professional basketball player.

== Before the WNBA ==
She is the daughter of Ulysse Gruda, who played for the French men's national basketball team, and grew up on Martinique. Before joining the WNBA, Gruda played professionally for the French club Union Sportive Valenciennes Olympic. She began playing on senior level in 2002, and professionally in 2005. She was voted the best European young women's player of the year 2006.

== WNBA career ==
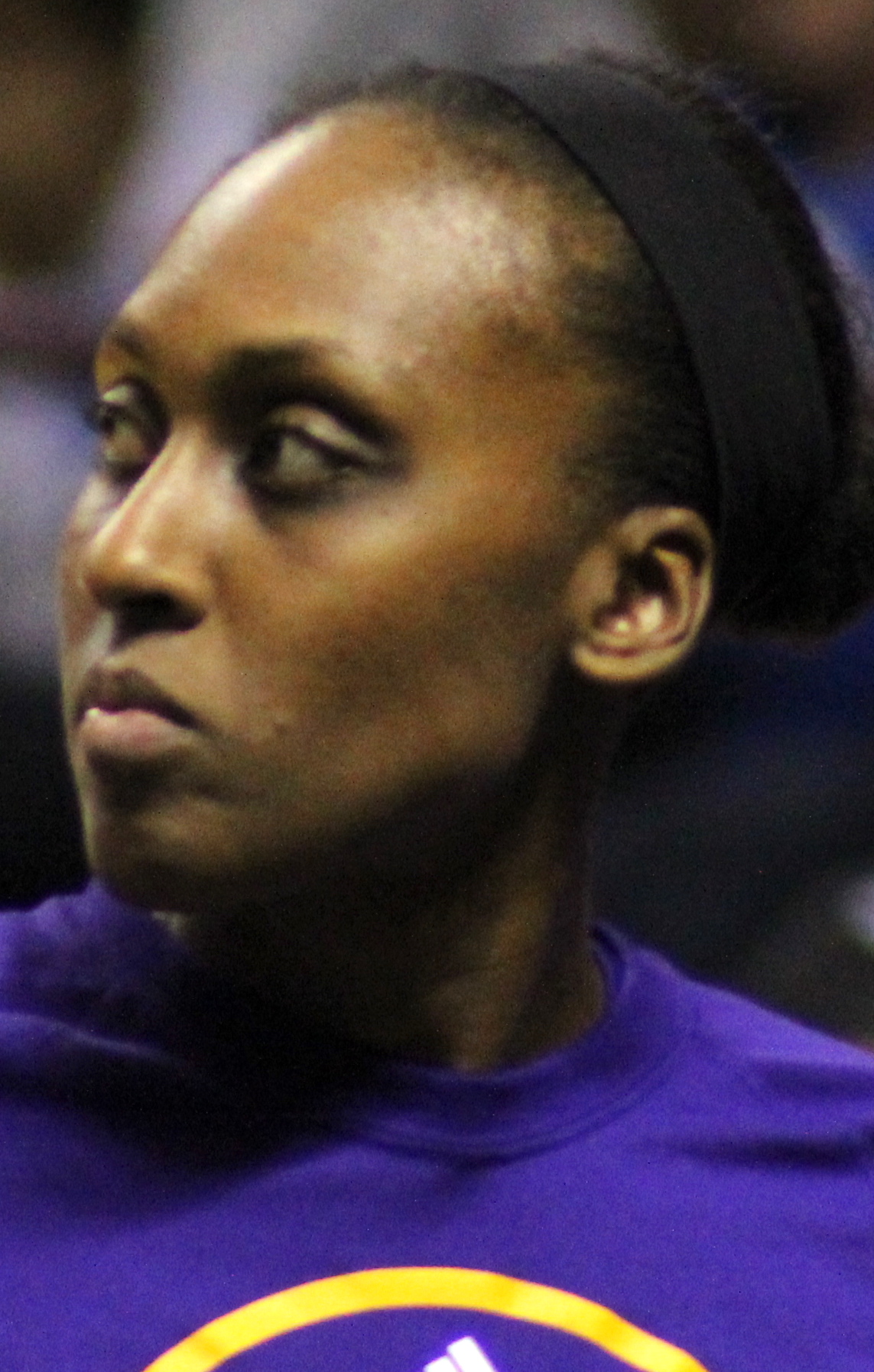
Gruda during the 2017 finals

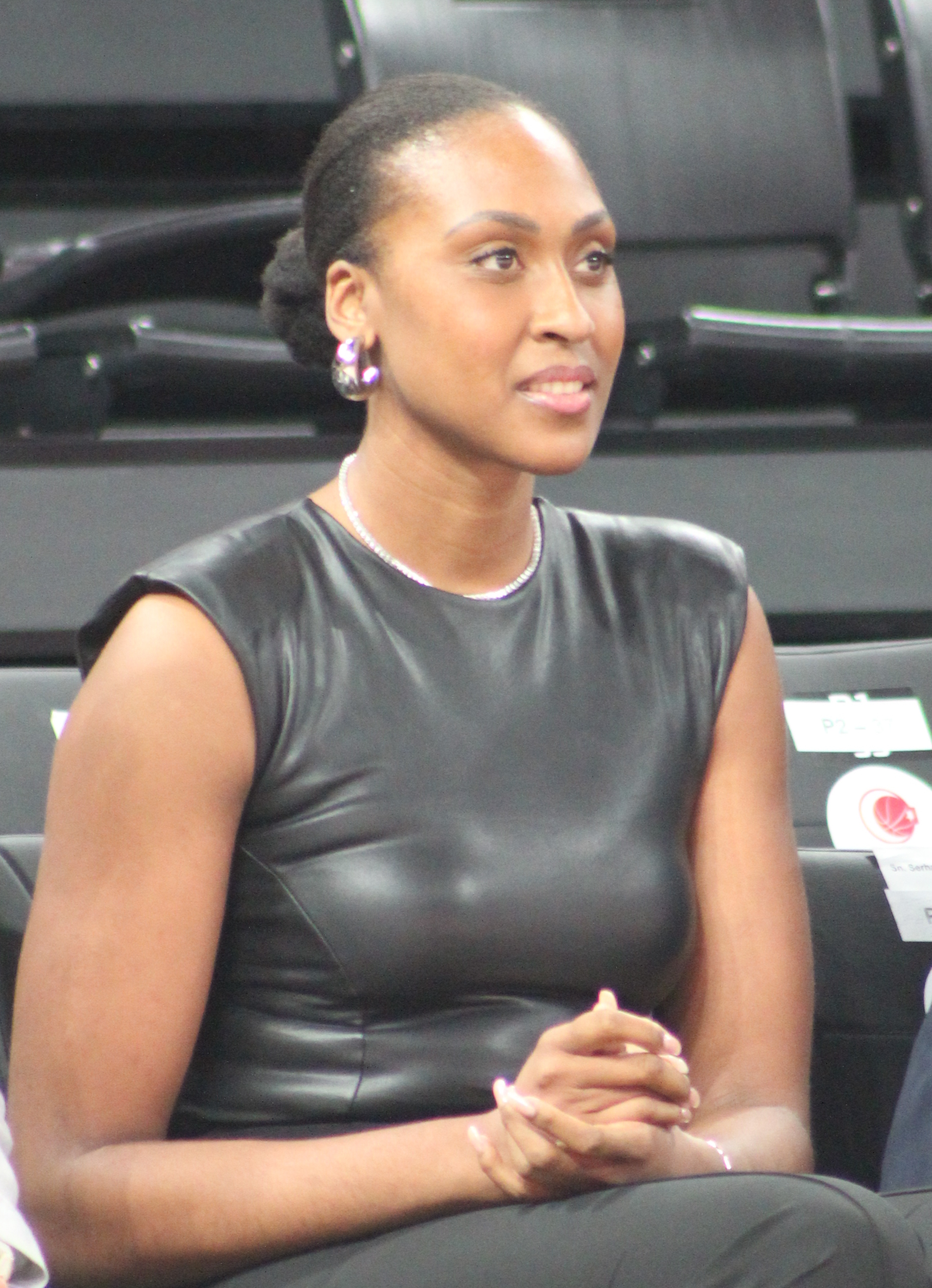
Gruda in 2024

Gruda was drafted 13th overall in the 2007 WNBA draft by the Connecticut Sun. She did not join the Sun until the 2008 season. She was highly touted by head coach Mike Thibault before joining the team. During her rookie season, she provided solid bench play and with her height and length, was a consistent rebounder and shot-blocker.

In 2014, she returned to the WNBA after a three-year absence, joining the Los Angeles Sparks as a reserve on the roster. Gruda sat out the 2015 season to prepare for the 2016 Summer Olympics with the France women's national basketball team in the qualifying tournament. In 2016, Gruda re-signed with the Sparks after the Olympic break. Later on in the season, Gruda would win her first WNBA championship with the Sparks after they defeated the Minnesota Lynx 3–2 in the Finals. Following the championship victory, after not being re-signed during free agency, Gruda returned to the Sparks midway through the 2017 season. The Sparks would go on to advance to the Finals for the second season in a row, after defeating the Phoenix Mercury in a 3-game sweep, setting up a rematch with the Lynx. However, the Sparks would lose to the Lynx in five games.

== Overseas career ==
She played for the Russian club UMMC Ekaterinburg from 2007 to 2016. On 6 July 2016, Fenerbahçe Istanbul announced her transfer to the club.

== National team ==
Gruda is the starting center for the France women's national basketball team, and led her team to the EuroBasket 2009 title. She was the best scorer and rebounder of the French side, and was voted to the all-tournament team. She also took part in the World Championship 2006 and the EuroBasket 2007, reaching the quarter-finals both times.
