= Anete Jēkabsone-Žogota =

Latvian basketball player (born 1983)

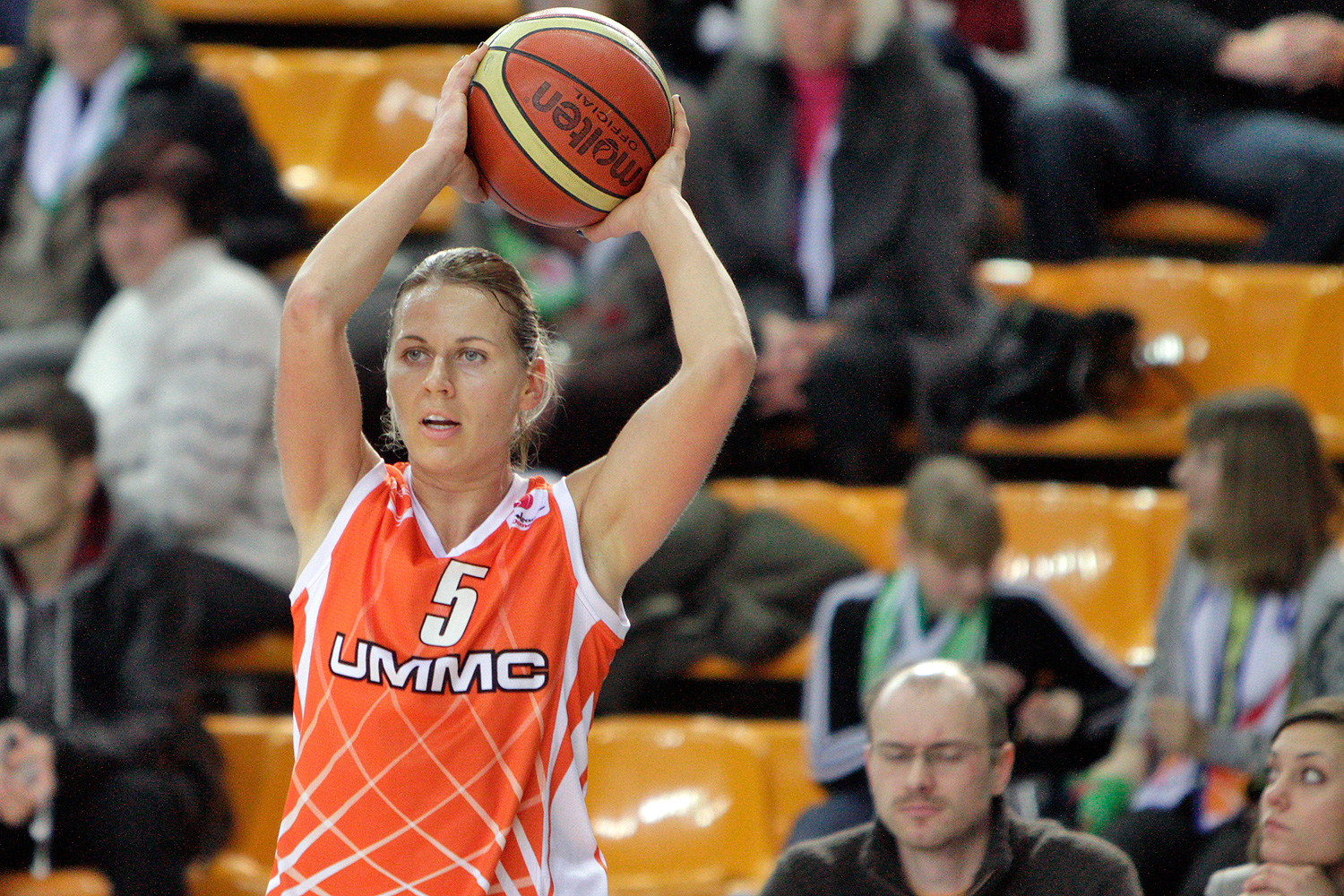

Personal information
- Born: August 12, 1983 (age 43) Riga, Latvia
- Listed height: 5 ft 9 in (1.75 m)
- Listed weight: 180 lb (82 kg)

Career information
- Playing career: 1997–present
- Position: Shooting guard

Career history
- 2009–2010: Connecticut Sun
- 2014: Phoenix Mercury

Career highlights
- FIBA Europe Young Women’s Player of the Year (2005); FIBA Europe Women's Player of the Year (2007); WNBA champion (2014)
- Stats at WNBA.com
- Stats at Basketball Reference

Anete Jēkabsone-Žogota (born August 12, 1983) is a former Latvian basketball player. She ended her career in 2016. She is a daughter of former VEF Rīga star player Andris Jēkabsons.

Jēkabsone-Žogota played for Dynamo Moscow. She joined the club in 2006–07 season after Ainārs Zvirgziņš was named head coach of the team. Before that she played for USO Mondeville and CJM Bourges Basket, both which are teams from France.

In 2007, Jēkabsone-Žogota played for the Latvia women's national basketball team in EuroBasket Women 2007. It was her second finals, where Jēkabsone-Žogota was the second-leading scorer behind Belgium's Ann Wauters with 17.2 points per game. She was also named to the EuroBasket Women 2007 all-tournament team.

At the 2008 Olympics she was fourth in scoring with 15.8 points and also was second with 4.0 assists per game.

In 2009, Jēkabsone-Žogota was signed as a free agent by the Connecticut Sun of the Women's National Basketball Association. She joined the team at the end of June and played in her first game on July 2 at Indiana.

== European clubs ==
- Dynamo Moscow
- CJM Bourges Basket
- USO Mondeville
- RTU/Klondaika
- TTT Rapa
- WBC Spartak Moscow Region
- Fenerbahçe Istanbul
- UMMC Ekaterinburg

In 2017, Anete Jēkabsone-Žogota ran in the Riga City Council elections from the joint list of the "Association of Latvian Regions" and the party "Latvia's Development" and on June 22 became a member of the Riga City Council. [2] She later joined the party "For the Development of Latvia". [54]

In the extraordinary elections of Riga City Council in 2020, he was re-elected to the municipality from "For Development / For!" and the "Progressive" list, receiving the support of the second largest voters after the list leader and the new chairman of the council Mārtiņš Staķis.

== Honors ==
- Named FIBA Europe Young Women’s Player of the Year in 2005.
- Named EuroBasket Women 2005 2nd team.
- Named EuroBasket Women 2007 1st team.
- EuroCup Women winner with Dynamo Moscow in 2007.
- Named FIBA Europe Women's Player of the Year 2007.
- Named EuroBasket Women 2009 team.

Awards
Preceded by Maria Stepanova	FIBA Europe Women's Player of the Year; 2007	Succeeded by Maria Stepanova
Preceded by Jeļena Prokopčuka	Latvian Women's Sportspersonality of the Year; 2008-2009	Succeeded by Ineta Radēviča
