= 2016–17 Women's Basketball Super League =

Women's Basketball Super League
- Season: 2016–17
- Games played: 182 (Regular Season)
- Teams: 14

Finals
- Champions: Yakın Doğu Üniversitesi
- Runners-up: Fenerbahçe
- All statistics correct as of 28 April 2017.

The 2016–17 Women's Basketball Super League is the 37th edition of the top-flight professional women's basketball league in Turkey.

Tosyalı Toyo Osmaniye and MBK Doğuş Hastanesi promoted to Turkish Women's Basketball League after 2015-2016 season.

On June 10 İstanbul BGD and Yakın Doğu Üniversitesi have merged and it will compete as Yakın Doğu Üniversitesi. Girne Üniversitesi took the spot of the Yakın Doğu Üniversitesi.

== Regular season ==
=== League table ===
Pos	Team	Pld	W	L	PF	PA	PD	Pts	Qualification or relegation
1	Yakın Doğu Üniversitesi	26	22	4	1995	1600	+395	48	Advance to Playoffs
2	Fenerbahçe	26	21	5	2054	1681	+373	47	Advance to Playoffs
3	Galatasaray	26	20	6	2022	1789	+233	46	Advance to Playoffs
4	Bellona AGÜ	26	19	7	1783	1635	+148	45	Advance to Playoffs
5	Beşiktaş	26	17	9	1716	1615	+101	43	Advance to Playoffs
6	Hatay BŞB	26	14	12	1806	1795	+11	40	Advance to Playoffs
7	Mersin BŞB	26	12	14	1806	1875	−69	38	Advance to Playoffs
8	İstanbul Üniversitesi	26	12	14	1830	1940	−110	38	Advance to Playoffs
9	Adana ASKİ	26	10	16	1764	1839	−75	36	
10	Botaş	26	10	16	1711	1823	−112	36	
11	Girne Üniversitesi	26	7	19	1817	1965	−148	33	
12	Canik Belediye	26	7	19	1723	1943	−220	33	
13	MBK Doğuş Hastanesi	26	6	20	1641	1927	−286	32	Relegation to TWB2L
14	Tosyalı Toyo Osmaniye	26	5	21	1772	2013	−241	31	Relegation to TWB2L

Updated to match(es) played on 28 April 2017. Source: TWBL

=== Results ===
Home \ Away	AGÜ	ADA	BEŞ	BOT	CAN	FEN	GAL	GİR	HAT	İÜN	MBK	MER	OSM	YDÜ
Bellona AGÜ	—	61–60	66–56	69–70	65–60	58–73	60–56	84–82	75–61	77–66	80–53	73–64	68–61	76–74
Adana ASKİ	47–66	—	61–56	78–85	72–55	69–76	56–80	82–76	58–65	75–82	56–57	70–58	76–74	76–89
Beşiktaş	20–0	62–73	—	75–60	78–73	62–60	89–76	72–62	68–64	76–59	71–62	68–54	75–67	67–73
Botaş	53–77	53–76	41–72	—	55–71	65–87	77–74	74–61	76–57	75–62	83–88	68–57	81–72	67–83
Canik Belediye	68–72	56–80	53–66	72–70	—	59–74	76–88	73–65	57–59	56–68	62–59	78–82	67–55	75–81
Fenerbahçe	74–79	86–58	66–47	64–60	106–63	—	77–55	90–81	103–76	76–64	92–64	71–64	92–58	76–64
Galatasaray	77–69	64–59	74–62	83–63	75–70	89–73	—	89–68	73–67	76–70	97–62	92–59	89–78	60–81
Girne Üniversitesi	68–77	71–65	65–71	79–76	82–64	56–76	68–88	—	69–55	90–93	66–60	68–79	71–84	66–57
Hatay BŞB	73–74	67–64	64–61	71–70	84–57	59–77	69–82	79–61	—	66–52	86–73	73–66	65–57	72–73
İstanbul Üniversitesi	48–81	66–59	65–71	76–72	86–101	74–73	65–78	83–87	76–75	—	79–74	73–54	75–64	72–102
MBK Doğuş Hastanesi	44–63	74–63	49–52	63–77	80–57	51–75	66–76	76–72	69–78	46–80	—	84–94	58–79	55–82
Mersin BŞB	75–74	72–80	94–84	66–75	75–62	79–76	70–71	74–69	60–72	85–59	67–64	—	76–63	71–79
Tosyalı Toyo Osmaniye	73–66	86–90	74–80	70–65	82–86	69–99	63–96	75–60	68–78	62–66	70–76	63–65	—	64–85
Yakın Doğu Üniversitesi	79–72	102–61	70–65	20–0	84–52	58–62	72–64	69–54	76–71	89–71	70–34	75–56	108–41	—

Source: TWBL Fixtures
Legend: Blue = home team win; Red = away team win.

== Play-off ==
Quarterfinals
1	Yakın Doğu Üniversitesi	83	94	X
8	İstanbul Üniversitesi	37	51	X
4	Abdullah Gül Üniversitesi	65	62	57
5	Beşiktaş	58	65	64
2	Fenerbahçe	82	102	X
7	Mersin BŞB	71	64	X
3	Galatasaray	72	87	X
6	Hatay BŞB	69	81	X

Semifinals
1	Yakın Doğu Üniversitesi	76	77	74	X	X
5	Beşiktaş	62	76	59	X	X
2	Fenerbahçe	83	97	77	X	X
3	Galatasaray	61	73	63	X	X

Finals
1	Yakın Doğu Üniversitesi	78	73	70	72	76
2	Fenerbahçe	70	67	71	79	75
