= Caferağa Sports Hall =

Indoor arena in Kadıköy, Istanbul, Turkey

Coordinates: 40°59′18″N 29°01′33″E

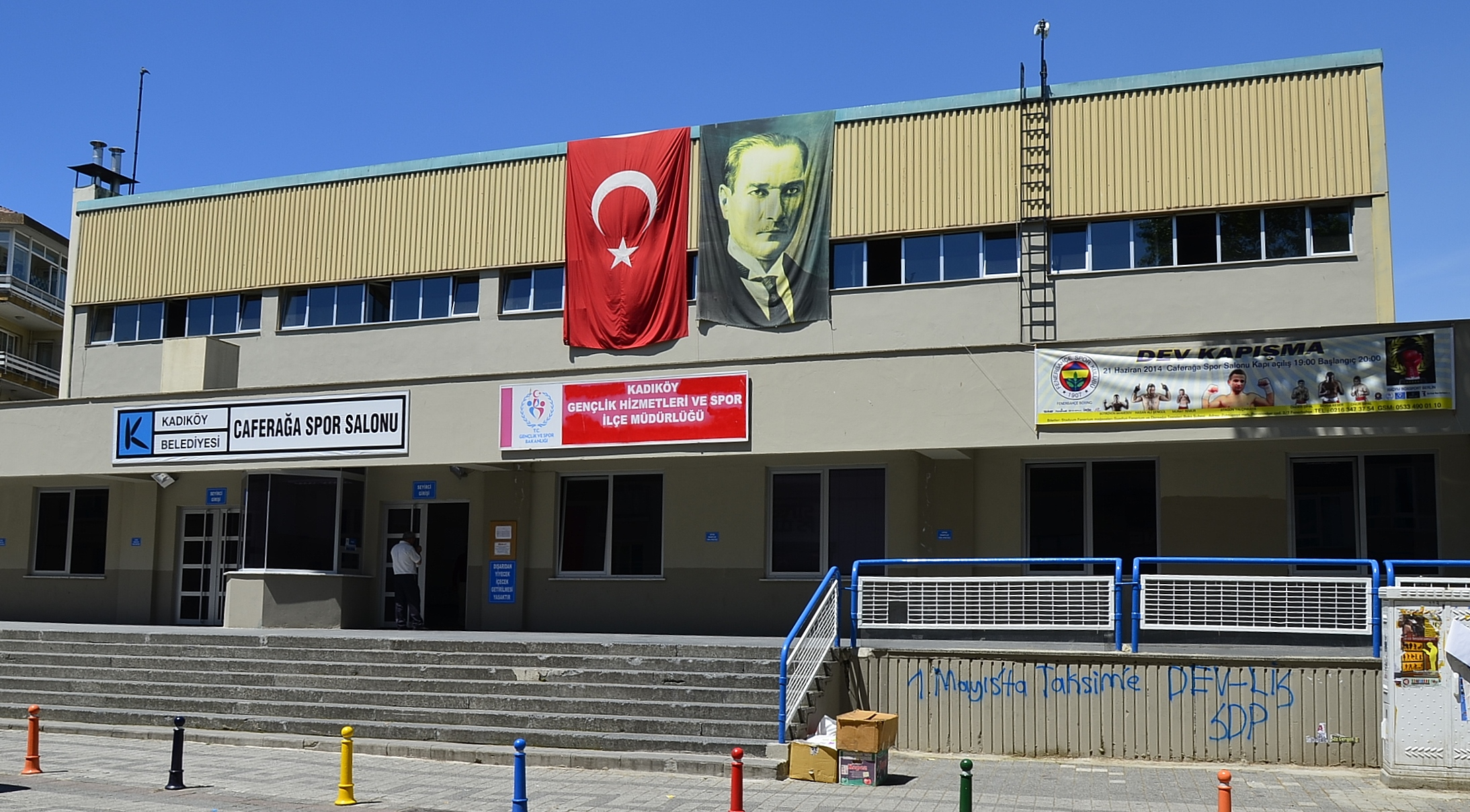
- Caferağa Sports Hall
- Interactive map of Caferağa Sports Hall
- Location: Sakız Sok. Bahariye; Kadıköy, Istanbul
- Owner: Municipality of Kadıköy
- Operator: Directorate of Youth and Sport of Istanbul Province
- Capacity: 2850

Construction
- Opened: 1982

Caferağa Sports Hall (Istanbul)

Caferağa Sports Hall (Turkish: Caferağa Spor Salonu) is a multi-purpose indoor arena located in Kadıköy, Istanbul, Turkey, and opened in 1982. It is owned by the Municipality of Kadıköy and operated by the Directorate of Youth and Sport of Istanbul Province.

The arena with an audience capacity of 2850, hosts beside national and international sports events such as basketball, table tennis, volleyball, wrestling and weightlifting, concerts and congresses.

== International sport events hosted ==
- September 29–30, 2007 8th International Veterans Table Tennis Tournament
