= FIBA Europe SuperCup Women =

Super cup competition

- Organising body: FIBA Europe
- Founded: 20 October 2009; 17 years ago
- First season: 2009
- Region: Europe
- Number of teams: 2
- Related competitions: EuroLeague Women; EuroCup Women
- Current champions: (Turkey) Fenerbahçe (3rd title) (2026)
- Most championships: (Russia) UMMC Ekaterinburg (4 titles)
- TV partners: courtside1891.basketball
- Website: fiba.basketball
- 2026 FIBA Europe SuperCup Women

The SuperCup Women (or Women SuperCup) is a super cup competition organized by FIBA Europe and contested between the winners of EuroLeague Women and EuroCup Women.

== History ==
The first edition of the Cup took place on October 20, 2009, and was contested between Spartak Moscow Region and Galatasaray in Vidnoye. In 2015 the SuperCup Women was played in a Final Four format between the finalists of EuroLeague Women and EuroCup Women.

In 2023, Fenerbahçe became the first and only Turkish club to date to win the title by beating France's LDLC ASVEL Féminin – the point differential of 57 is a record in the competition's history.

Spartak Moscow Region and Beretta-Famila played on October 16, 2008 during 2008–09 EuroLeague Women as an unofficial SuperCup game.

== Finals ==
| EuroCup winner |

| Year | Host | Final | | | Third and fourth place | |
| Year | Host | Winner | Score | Runner-up | Third place | Fourth place |
|---|---|---|---|---|---|---|
| 2008 (unofficial); Details | Russia (Vidnoye) | (Russia); Spartak Moscow Region | 88–63 | (Italy); Beretta Famila Schio | Played one game | |
| 2009; Details | Russia (Vidnoye) | (Russia); Spartak Moscow Region | 92–59 | (Turkey); Galatasaray | Played one game | |
| 2010; Details | Greece (Marousi) | (Russia); Spartak Moscow Region | 70–61 | (Greece); Athinaikos | Played one game | |
| 2011; Details | Spain (Salamanca) | (Spain); Perfumerías Avenida | 95–72 | (Israel); Elitzur Ramla | Played one game | |
| 2012 | Not held | | | | | |
| 2013; Details | Russia (Ekaterinburg) | (Russia); UMMC Ekaterinburg | 72–63 | (Russia); Dynamo Moscow | Played one game | |
| 2014 | Not held | | | | | |
| 2015; Details | Belgium (Braine-l'Alleud) | (Czech Republic); ZVVZ USK Praha | 93–91 | (Russia); UMMC Ekaterinburg | (Belgium); Castors Braine | (France); ESB Villeneuve-d'Ascq |
| 2016; Details | France (Villeneuve-d'Ascq) | (Russia); UMMC Ekaterinburg | 66–63 | (France); ESB Villeneuve-d'Ascq | Played one game | |
| 2017; Details | Russia (Kursk) | (Russia); Dynamo Kursk | 84–73 | (Turkey); Yakın Doğu Üniversitesi | Played one game | |
| 2018; Details | Russia (Ekaterinburg) | (Russia); UMMC Ekaterinburg | 79–40 | (Turkey); Galatasaray | Played one game | |
| 2019; Details | Russia (Ekaterinburg) | (Russia); UMMC Ekaterinburg | 87–67 | (Russia); Nadezhda Orenburg | Played one game | |
| 2020 | Cancelled due to the COVID-19 pandemic in Europe | | | | | |
| 2021; Details | Spain (Valencia) | (Spain); Valencia Basket | 75–68 | (Russia); UMMC Ekaterinburg | Played one game | |
| 2022; Details | France (Bourges) | (France); Tango Bourges Basket | 65–44 | (Hungary); Sopron Basket | Played one game | |
| 2023; Details | France (Lyon) | (Turkey); Fenerbahçe | 109–52 | (France); LDLC ASVEL Féminin | Played one game | |
| 2024; Details | Turkey (Istanbul) | (Turkey); Fenerbahçe | 79–63 | (Turkey); Beşiktaş | Played one game | |
| 2025; Details | France (Villeneuve-d'Ascq) | (Czech Republic); ZVVZ USK Praha | 86–77 | (France); Villeneuve d'Ascq LM | Played one game | |
| 2026; Details | Turkey (Mersin) | (Turkey); Fenerbahçe | 79–71 | (Turkey); Çimsa ÇBK Mersin | Played one game | |

== Performances ==
=== Performance by club ===
| Club | Winners | Winning years | Runners-up | Runner-up years |
|---|---|---|---|---|
| (Russia) UMMC Ekaterinburg | 4 | 2013, 2016, 2018, 2019 | 2 | 2015, 2021 |
| (Turkey) Fenerbahçe | 3 | 2023, 2024, 2026 | | |
| (Russia) Spartak Moscow Region | 2 | 2009, 2010 | | |
| (Czech Republic) ZVVZ USK Praha | 2 | 2015, 2025 | | |
| (Spain) Perfumerías Avenida | 1 | 2011 | | |
| (Russia) Dynamo Kursk | 1 | 2017 | | |
| (Spain) Valencia Basket | 1 | 2021 | | |
| (France) Tango Bourges Basket | 1 | 2022 | | |
| (Turkey) Galatasaray | | | 2 | 2009, 2018 |
| (France) ESB Villeneuve-d'Ascq | | | 2 | 2016, 2025 |
| (Greece) Athinaikos | | | 1 | 2010 |
| (Israel) Elitzur Ramla | | | 1 | 2011 |
| (Russia) Dynamo Moscow | | | 1 | 2013 |
| (Turkey) Yakın Doğu Üniversitesi | | | 1 | 2017 |
| (Russia) Nadezhda Orenburg | | | 1 | 2019 |
| (Hungary) Sopron Basket | | | 1 | 2022 |
| (France) LDLC ASVEL Féminin | | | 1 | 2023 |
| (Turkey) Beşiktaş | | | 1 | 2024 |
| (Turkey) ÇBK Mersin | | | 1 | 2026 |

=== Performance by country ===
| Country | Titles | Runner-up | Finals |
|---|---|---|---|
| Russia | 8 | 4 | 12 |
| Turkey | 3 | 5 | 8 |
| Czech Republic | 2 | 0 | 2 |
| Spain | 2 | 0 | 2 |
| France | 1 | 3 | 4 |
| Italy | 0 | 1 | 1 |
| Greece | 0 | 1 | 1 |
| Israel | 0 | 1 | 1 |
| Hungary | 0 | 1 | 1 |

== See also ==
=== Men's competitions ===
- EuroLeague
- EuroLeague Super Cup
- Basketball Champions League
- EuroCup Basketball
- FIBA Europe Cup
- European North Basketball League

=== Women's competitions ===
- EuroLeague Women
- EuroCup Women
- European Women's Basketball League
