= Teja Oblak =

Slovenian basketball player

No. 3 – Portland Fire
- Position: Point guard
- League: WNBA; EuroLeague Women

Personal information
- Born: December 20, 1990 (age 35) Kranj, SR Slovenia, Yugoslavia
- Listed height: 5 ft 8 in (1.73 m)
- Listed weight: 149 lb (68 kg)

Career information
- Playing career: 2002–present

Career history
- 2002–2009: ŽKK Odeja Škofja Loka
- 2009–2011: ŽKK Hit Kranjska Gora
- 2011–2013: ŽKK Merkur Celje
- 2013–2014: CCC Polkowice
- 2014–2017: Good Angels Košice
- 2017–2018: Atomerőmű KSC Szekszárd
- 2018–2025: ZVVZ USK Praha
- 2025–2026: Galatasaray
- 2026–present: Portland Fire

Career highlights
- 1× EuroLeague champion (2025); 6x Czech Women's Basketball League Champion (2019–2024); 3x Slovak Women's Basketball Extraliga Champion (2015–2017); 4x Slovenian Women's Basketball League Champion (2009–2013); 3x Slovenian Women's Basketball Cup (2011, 2012, 2013); Hungarian Cup (2018)
- Stats at WNBA.com
- Stats at Basketball Reference

Teja Oblak (born December 20, 1990) is a Slovenian basketball player for the Portland Fire of the American Women's National Basketball Association (WNBA), and for the Slovenian national team.

== Club career ==
She began her basketball career in her hometown Škofja Loka, playing eight years for her local team Odeja Škofja Loka. In Euroleague, she combined one season in Polkowice with three seasons for Good Angels Košice and one season in Atomerömü KSC Szekszard and in 2018, she moved to ZVVZ USK Praha. In April 2025, Oblak won the 2024–25 EuroLeague Women, Europe's premium basketball competition for women, with the czech team.

=== ZVVZ USK Praha ===
She won the 2024-25 EuroLeague Women championship while playing for ZVVZ USK Praha of the Czech Women's Basketball League.

=== Galatasaray ===
On June 9, 2025, she signed with Galatasaray of the Turkish Women's Basketball Super League (TKBL). She averaged 10.2 points and 4.4 assists per game.

=== Portland Fire ===
On April 15, 2026, WNBA expansion team Portland Fire signed Oblak to a rookie-scale contract. On May 21, 2026, the Fire activated Oblak's contract.

== International career ==
She participated at the EuroBasket Women 2017.

== Personal life ==
She is the older sister of Jan Oblak, a professional football goalkeeper for Atlético Madrid and the Slovenia national team.
