= Mihajlo Vuković =

Serbian basketball player and coach (1944–2021)

Personal information
- Born: 25 June 1944 Miločaj, German-occupied Serbia
- Died: 15 January 2021 (aged 76) Valencia, Spain

Career information
- NBA draft: 1966: undrafted
- Playing career: 1962–1972
- Coaching career: 1972–2000

Career history

Playing
- 1962–1965: Sloga Kraljevo
- 1966–1972: Sloboda Tuzla

Coaching
- 1972–1986: Jedinstvo Tuzla (men's youth)
- 1986–1990: Jedinstvo Tuzla
- 1989–1990: Sloboda Tuzla
- 1990–1995: Godella Valencia
- 1995–2000: Valencia Basket
Medals
Women's basketball
Head Coach for Yugoslavia
FIBA World Cup
Silver medal – second place	1990 Malaysia	Team
Summer Universiade
Bronze medal – third place	1985 Japan

Mihajlo "Miki" Vuković (Serbian Cyrillic: Михајло "Мики" Вуковић; 25 June 1944 – 15 January 2021) was a Serbian professional basketball player and coach.

== Early life ==
Vuković was born in a village Miločaj near Kraljevo, German-occupied Serbia. He started to play basketball in his hometown club Sloga. In 1966, he moved to Tuzla, SR Bosnia and Herzegovina where he played for Sloboda. He retired as a player with Sloboda in 1972.

== Coaching career ==
=== Women's basketball ===
During late 1980s, Vuković was the head coach of Jedinstvo Tuzla led by Razija Mujanović. He won EuroLeague Women in 1988–89 and three Yugoslav Women's League championships.

Between 1990 and 1995, Vuković was the head coach of Valencia-based team Dorna Godella.

=== Men's basketball ===
Vuković coached his former club Sloboda Tuzla during the 1989–90 Yugoslav League season.

In 1995, Valencia Basket hired Vuković as their new head coach. He won a Spanish Men's Cup in 1998 and lost two finals, the 2000 Spanish Cup and the 1999 FIBA Saporta Cup. Vuković left the club in 2000.

=== National teams ===
In 1984, Vuković was the head coach for the Yugoslavia U16 women's team at the FIBA European Championship for Cadettes in Italy. His team finished 7th.

Vuković was the head coach for the Yugoslavia women's national team that won the silver medal at the 1990 FIBA World Championship in Malaysia.

== Career achievements and awards ==
As head coach:

- EuroLeague Women champion: 3 (with Jedinstvo Tuzla: 1988–89; with Dorna Godella: 1991–92, 1992–93)
- FIBA Intercontinental Cup for Women champion: 1 (with Dorna Godella: 1991–92)
- Spanish Women's League champion: 5 (with Dorna Godella: 1990–91, 1991–92, 1992–93, 1993–94, 1994–95)
- Yugoslav Women's League champion: 3 (with Jedinstvo Tuzla: 1986–87, 1987–88, 1989–90)
- Spanish Women's Cup winner: 3 (with Dorna Godella: 1991, 1992, 1994)
- Spanish Men's Cup winner: 1 (with Valencia Basket: 1998)
- Yugoslav Women's Cup winner: 1 (with Jedinstvo Tuzla: 1987–88)

== See also ==
- List of EuroLeague Women winning coaches
