= Milan Vasojević =

Serbian basketball coach

Personal information
- Born: 27 December 1932 Belgrade, Kingdom of Yugoslavia
- Died: 24 December 1996 (aged 63) Belgrade, Serbia, FR Yugoslavia
- Coaching career: 1960–1994

Career history

Coaching
- 1960–1962: Radnički Beograd
- 1962–1967: Crvena zvezda
- 1967–1970: Recoaro Vicenza
- 1970–1976: Standa Milano
- 1976–1978: Radnički Beograd Men
- 1978–1979: Vojvodina
- 1981–1982: UFO Schio
- 1989–1991: Italmeco Bari
- 1991–1992: Viterbo
- 1992–1994: Beton Berica Thiene

Career highlights
- 3× Yugoslavian League champion (1961–1963); 3× Italian League champion (1968, 1969, 1973); 2× Yugoslavian Cup winner (1960, 1962); Ivković Award for Lifetime Achievement (2000)
- FIBA Hall of Fame
Medals
Women's basketball
Head coach for Yugoslavia
Summer Olympics
Silver medal – second place	1988 Seoul	Team
Bronze medal – third place	1980 Moscow	Team
EuroBasket
Silver medal – second place	1987 Spain	Team
Bronze medal – third place	1980 Yugoslavia	Team
Universiade
Bronze medal – third place	1983 Edmonton	Team
Gold medal – first place	1987 Zagreb	Team
Under-19 World Championship
Bronze medal – third place	1985 United States	Team
Under-18 European Championship
Silver medal – second place	1982 Bulgaria	Team
European Championship for Cadettes
Silver medal – second place	1982 Finland	Team
Bronze medal – third place	1985 Yugoslavia	Team

Milan "Ciga" Vasojević (Serbian Cyrillic: Милан "Цига" Васојевић; 27 December 1932 – 24 December 1996) was a Serbian professional basketball coach and administrator. He led the national team of Yugoslavia during the greatest successes of women's basketball.

== Coaching career ==
=== Women's basketball ===
Vasojević coached two Belgrade-based teams, Radnički and Crvena zvezda, during the 1960s, winning three Yugoslavian League championships as well as two Yugoslav Cup titles in 1960 and 1962.

After leaving Crvena zvezda, Vasojević moved to Italy to coach Recoaro Vicenza from 1967 to 1970, leading the team to two Italian League championships in 1968 and 1969. He then joined Standa Milano, where he stayed for six years, winning an Italian League in 1973. In 1976, he returned to Yugoslavia, where he coached the men's teams until 1979.

In 1981, Vasojević joined UFO Schio for a year before moving to Italmeco Bari from 1989 to 1991. He coached Viterbo for one year in the 1991–92 season before ending his coaching career with Beton Berica Thiene from 1992 to 1994.

=== Men's basketball ===
Vasojević coached Radnički Belgrade for two seasons: 1976–77 and 1977–78. In 1977, Radnički reached the Cup Winners' Cup Finals, where they lost to Forst Cantù by a single point margin, 86–87. Also, he coached Vojvodina in the 1978–79 season.

== National team coaching career ==
The arrival of Vasojević as a head coach of the Yugoslavia women's national team in 1980 was followed by their significant achievements. At his debut at the 1980 European Championship in Banja Luka, Yugoslavia won the bronze medal, and only one month later the same success was achieved at the Summer Olympic Games in Moscow.

The change of generations took place under Vasojević. He offered an opportunity to the younger players he fully believed in, such as Anđelija Arbutina, Danira Nakić, Razija Mujanović, Jelica Komnenović, Olivera Krivokapić, Bojana Milošević, and Slađana Golić.

At the 1987 Summer Universiade held in Zagreb, Yugoslavia won the gold medal, the only gold ever in women's senior international competitions. The same year, at the European Championship in Cádiz, Yugoslavia won the silver medal in a tough final game against the Soviet Union which ended with an 83–73 win by the Soviet team.

The 1988 Summer Olympic Games in Seoul were the crown of one generation. An important moment of the semi-final game against Australia was a score of Anđelija Arbutina one second before the game end (57–56) for a place in the Olympic finals. The final game for the Olympic gold medal against the United States national team ended with a 77–70 win by the American team, but the Yugoslavs showed all their talent and strongly resisted until the very end of the game.

== Post-coaching career ==
Vasojević was the first director of basketball club Hemofarm from Vršac takes office in 1995.

== Career achievements ==
- Yugoslav Women's League champion: 3 (with Radnički Beograd: 1961, 1962; with Crvena zvezda: 1963)
- Italian Women's League champion: 3 (with Vicenza: 1968, 1969; with Standa Milano: 1973)
- Yugoslav Women's Basketball Cup winner: 2 (with Radnički Beograd: 1960, 1962)

== Legacy ==
In 2006, the Basketball Federation of Serbia named the national cup for women in his honor.

In November 2022, he was inducted into the FIBA Hall of Fame.

== See also ==
- List of members of the FIBA Hall of Fame
- Milan Ciga Vasojević Cup
