= Shante Evans =

American-Slovenian basketball player

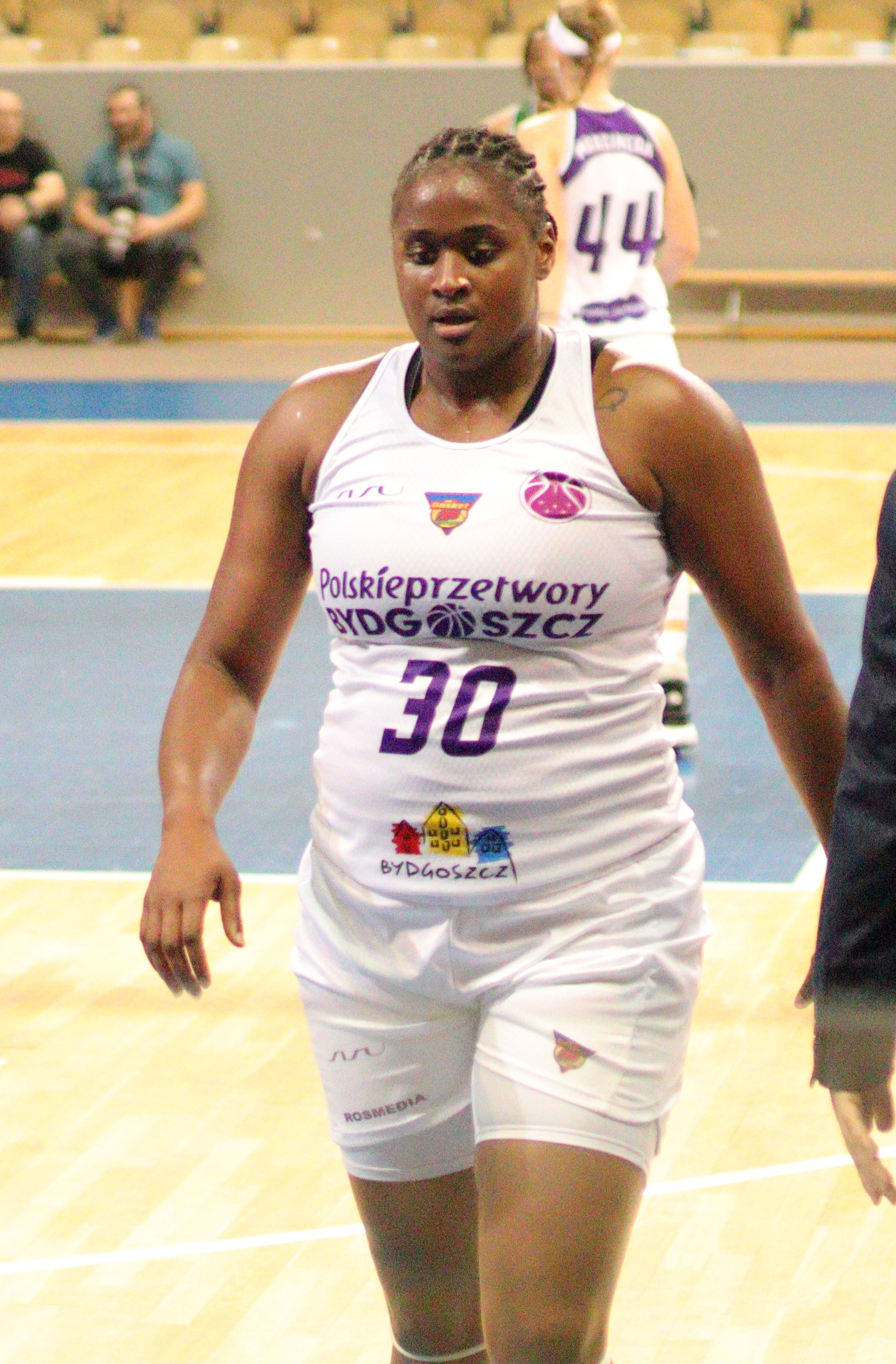
- Evans in 2022

Žabiny Brno
- Position: Power forward
- League: Czech Women's Basketball League

Personal information
- Born: July 8, 1991 (age 35) West Chester, Pennsylvania
- Listed height: 6 ft 1 in (1.85 m)

Career information
- High school: Henderson (West Chester, Pennsylvania)
- College: Hofstra (2009–2013)
- WNBA draft: 2013: undrafted
- Playing career: 2013–present

Career history
- 2013–2014: WBC Dunav Ruse
- 2013–2014: Pays d'Aix Basket 13
- 2015–2016: Sf. Gheorghe
- 2016–2017: Cinkarna Celje
- 2017–2017: Uni Girona
- 2018–2019: Villeneuve-d'Ascq
- 2019–2021: Artego Bydgoszcz
- 2021–2022: Perfumerias Avenida
- 2022: Galatasaray
- 2022–2023: Basket 25 Bydgoszcz
- 2024–2025: Casademont Zaragoza
- 2025–: Žabiny Brno

Career highlights
- Bulgarian League Champion (2014); Romanian League Champion (2016); Slovenian League Champion (2017); Adriatic League Champion (2017); Slovenian Cup Winner (2017); 3x First-team All-CAA (2011–2013); CAA All-Freshman Team (2010)

Shante Evans (born July 8, 1991) is a basketball player for Žabiny Brno. Born in the United States, she represents the Slovenian national team internationally.

== Club career ==
On February 7, 2022 Evans signed with Galatasaray.

On February 14, 2024, she signed for Casademont Zaragoza of the Spanish women's league. The summer of 2025, she was announced as one of the new additions to the squad for the following season at Žabiny Brno.

== National team career ==
She participated at the EuroBasket Women 2017 and EuroBasket Women 2019.

== Hofstra statistics ==
Legend
GP	Games played	GS	Games started	MPG	Minutes per game
FG%	Field goal percentage	3P%	3-point field goal percentage	FT%	Free throw percentage
RPG	Rebounds per game	APG	Assists per game	SPG	Steals per game
BPG	Blocks per game	PPG	Points per game	**Bold**	Career high

Year	Team	GP	Points	FG%	3P%	FT%	RPG	APG	SPG	BPG	PPG
2009—10	Hofstra	**34**	453	48.3%	0.0%	58.3%	9.5	0.9	1.0	0.5	13.3
2010—11	Hofstra	31	571	**53.0%**	0.0%	65.6%	11.0	0.6	1.4	0.5	18.4
2011—12	Hofstra	31	**594**	48.9%	0.0%	**71.6%**	10.5	1.0	1.2	**0.9**	**19.2**
2012—13	Hofstra	31	498	46.8%	**16.7%**	67.5%	**11.5**	**1.9**	**1.5**	0.9	16.1
Career		127	2116	49.3%	11.1%	66.1%	4.9	1.1	1.3	0.7	16.7
