= Žana Lelas =

Yugoslav and Croatian basketball player (1970–2021)

Personal information
- Born: 28 May 1970 Split, SR Croatia, SFR Yugoslavia (now Croatia)
- Died: 15 September 2021 (aged 51) Split, Croatia
- Listed height: 1.88 m (6 ft 2 in)
- Listed weight: 70 kg (154 lb)
- Position: Center

Career history
- Šibenik
Medals
Women's basketball
Representing Yugoslavia
Olympic Games
| Silver medal – second place | 1988 Seoul | Team |
EuroBasket Women
| Silver medal – second place | 1991 Tel Aviv | Team |

Žana Lelas (28 May 1970 – 15 September 2021) was a Croatian professional basketball player. She represented Yugoslavia and Croatia in basketball and is regarded as one of few players to have represented two nations at international level. She was married to Vjekoslav Lokica, a renowned football coach.

== Career ==
Zana Lelas was the winner of the bronze medal with the Yugoslavia U16 team at the 1987 FIBA European Championship. She was also the top scorer of the 1987 FIBA U-16 European Championship averaging 26.6 points per game.

Lelas was part of the Yugoslavian side that clinched the silver medal in the women's basketball competition at the 1988 Summer Olympics. She was a key member of the Yugoslavia U19 side which emerged as runners-up to the Soviet Union at the 1989 FIBA Under-19 World Championship. Lelas also secured a silver medal with the Yugoslavia side at the EuroBasket Women 1991 which was Yugoslavia's fourth loss in a EuroBasket final.

Lelas played most of her matches representing Yugoslavia, but later in her career she represented Croatia at the EuroBasket Women 1995 where Croatia eventually made its EuroBasket tournament debut. She was the top scorer for ŽKK Croatia 2006 Zagreb in the 1995 Ronchetti Cup, averaging 20.9 points per game.

After her retirement, she began coaching basketball at Žana Lelas Basketball Academy, which she founded in July 2016.

Žana Lelas died on 15 September 2021 at the age of 51.
