= EuroBasket Women 1997 squads =

== Group A ==
=== Yugoslavia ===
Yugoslavia roster
Players
Coaches

Pos.	No.	Name	Age – Date of birth	Height	Club
	4	Gordana Bogojević	–
	5	Danijela Ilić	–
	6	Snežana Jovanović	–
	7	Lara Mandić	–
	8	Slobodanka Tuvić	–
	9	Milenka Nedović	–
	10	Jelena Mirković	–
	11	Daliborka Vilipić	–
	12	Slavica Ilić	–
	13	Merlina Gostiljac	–
	14	Sanja Vesel	–
	15	Katarina Lazić	–

Head coach

- Slobodan Lukić

Legend

- (C) Team captain
- nat field describes country
  of last club
  before the tournament
- Age field is age on June 6, 1997

== Group B ==
=== Bosnia and Herzegovina ===
Bosnia and Herzegovina roster
Players
Coaches

Pos.	No.	Name	Age – Date of birth	Height	Club
	4	Melisa Hadžimustafić	–
	5	Tima Džebo	–
	6	Nura Imamović	–
	7	Mara Lakić	–
	8	Aiša Suljanović	–
	9	Lejla Durmić	–
	10	Amra Alagić	–
	11	Dragana Zorić	–
	12	Razija Mujanović	–
	13	Dženana Neimarlija	–
	14	Nidžara Munković	–
	15	Alisa Tunja	–

Head coach

Legend

- (C) Team captain
- nat field describes country
  of last club
  before the tournament
- Age field is age on June 6, 1997
