= 1985 FIBA Under-19 World Championship for Women =

Championship

1985 FIBA Under-19 Women's Basketball World Cup
Tournament details
- Host country: United States
- Dates: August 13–21
- Teams: 10 (from 5 federations)
- Venue: 1 (in 1 host city)

Final positions
- Champions: Soviet Union (1st title)

Tournament statistics

The 1985 FIBA Under-19 World Championship for Women took place in the United States from 13 to 21 August 1985. It was co-organised by the International Basketball Federation (FIBA) and USA Basketball.

Ten national teams competed for the championship. Soviet Union came away with the Gold medal by defeating South Korea 80-75 in the final.

== Venues ==
- United States Olympic Training Center at Colorado Springs, Colorado, United States

== Qualification ==
Means of qualification	Dates	Venue	Berths	Qualifiers
Host nation			1	United States
1984 ABC Under-18 Championship for Women	19 April 1984	Seoul, Korea	2	China; South Korea
FIBA Africa Under-18 Championship for Women	17 June 1985	Accra, Ghana	1	Senegal
FIBA U18 Women's European Championship	25 Aug 1984	Toledo, Spain	3	Yugoslavia; Soviet Union; Spain
FIBA Americas			2	Canada; Cuba
FIBA Oceania			1	Australia
Total			10	

It is unknown how Canada, Cuba, and Australia qualified and why Czechoslovakia who finished 3rd in the previous year's European championship did not participate.

== Preliminary round ==
All times are local (UTC-6).

=== Group A ===
Pos	Team	Pld	W	L	PF	PA	PD	Pts	YUG	CHN	ESP	CAN	SEN
1	Yugoslavia	4	4	0	375	204	+171	8		92–58	91–43	109–64	83–39
2	China	4	3	1	323	288	+35	7	58–92		87–85	95–65	83–46
3	Spain	4	2	2	279	287	−8	6	43–91	85–87		80–59	71–50
4	Canada	4	1	3	239	330	−91	5	64–109	65–95	59–80		51–46
5	Senegal	4	0	4	181	288	−107	4	39–83	46–83	50–71	46–51	

Source: FIBA
Legend: Blue = home team win; Yellow = draw; Red = away team win.
Rules for classification: 1) Points; 2) Head-to-head results; 3) Points difference; 4) Points scored.

13 August 1985
13:00

Boxscore

Senegal	50–71	Spain
Scoring by half: 21−27, 29−44
Pts: S. Thiam 15		Pts: Guer 13

United States Olympic Training Center, Colorado Springs

13 August 1985
20:00

Boxscore

China	58–92	Yugoslavia
Scoring by half: 31−51, 27−41
Pts: Wang 20		Pts: Milošević, Počeković, Pukšić, Vangelovska 17

United States Olympic Training Center, Colorado Springs

14 August 1985
15:00

Boxscore

Spain	43–91	Yugoslavia
Scoring by half: 20−47, 23−44
Pts: Guer 13		Pts: Milošević 19

United States Olympic Training Center, Colorado Springs

14 August 1985
18:00

Boxscore

Canada	65–95	China
Scoring by half: 36−45, 29−50
Pts: Kowal 27		Pts: Wang 23

United States Olympic Training Center, Colorado Springs

15 August 1985
13:00

Boxscore

Canada	51–46	Senegal
Scoring by half: 29−15, 22−31
Pts: Kowal 16		Pts: N'Dong 18

United States Olympic Training Center, Colorado Springs

15 August 1985
15:00

Boxscore

China	87–85 (OT)	Spain
Scoring by half: 39−30, 38−47 Overtime: 10−8
Pts: Wang 24		Pts: Jiménez 23

United States Olympic Training Center, Colorado Springs

16 August 1985
13:00

Boxscore

China	83–46	Senegal
Scoring by half: 39−28, 44−18
Pts: Li Z. 19		Pts: N'Dong 22

United States Olympic Training Center, Colorado Springs

16 August 1985
15:00

Boxscore

Canada	64–109	Yugoslavia
Scoring by half: 34−55, 30−54
Pts: Kowal 18		Pts: Pukšić 27

United States Olympic Training Center, Colorado Springs

=== Group B ===
Pos	Team	Pld	W	L	PF	PA	PD	Pts	KOR	URS	USA	AUS	CUB
1	South Korea	4	3	1	337	337	0	7		91–88	76–70	95–87	75–92
2	Soviet Union	4	3	1	364	295	+69	7	88–91		96–71	84–72	96–61
3	United States	4	2	2	308	307	+1	6	70–76	71–96		79–62	88–73
4	Australia	4	1	3	285	320	−35	5	87–95	72–84	62–79		64–62
5	Cuba	4	1	3	288	323	−35	5	92–75	61–96	73–88	62–64	

Source: FIBA
Legend: Blue = home team win; Yellow = draw; Red = away team win.
Rules for classification: 1) Points; 2) Head-to-head results; 3) Points difference; 4) Points scored.

13 June 1985
15:00

Boxscore

Australia	64–62	Cuba
Scoring by half: 37-42, 27-20
Pts: S. Russel 15		Pts: M. Molinet 13

United States Olympic Training Center, Colorado Springs

13 June 1985
18:00

Boxscore

South Korea	76–70	United States
Scoring by half: 34-44, 42-26
Pts: A. Yung 27		Pts: A. Jones 18

United States Olympic Training Center, Colorado Springs

14 June 1985
11:00

Boxscore

Australia	62–79	United States
Scoring by half: 29-48, 33-31
Pts: S. Gorman 17		Pts: A. Jones 22

United States Olympic Training Center, Colorado Springs

14 June 1985
20:00

Boxscore

South Korea	91–88	Soviet Union
Scoring by half: 50-47, 41-41
Pts: K. Choi 33		Pts: Kuznetsova 22

United States Olympic Training Center, Colorado Springs

15 June 1985
18:00

Boxscore

Cuba	61–96	Soviet Union
Scoring by half: 28-51, 33-45
Pts: D. Henry Hernandez 15		Pts: Kafanova 18

United States Olympic Training Center, Colorado Springs

15 June 1985
20:00

Boxscore

Australia	87–95	South Korea
Scoring by half: 40-53, 47-42
Pts: M. Timms 27		Pts: L. Kun-Gin 24

United States Olympic Training Center, Colorado Springs

16 June 1985
18:00

Boxscore

Cuba	92–75	South Korea
Scoring by half: 53-32, 39-43
Pts: A. Regla 34		Pts: L. Kun-Gin 17

United States Olympic Training Center, Colorado Springs

16 June 1985
20:00

Boxscore

United States	71–96	Soviet Union
Scoring by half: 32-48, 39-48
Pts: F. Jackson 13		Pts: Tornikidu 25

United States Olympic Training Center, Colorado Springs

17 June 1985
18:00

Boxscore

Cuba	71–96	United States
Scoring by half: 32-48, 39-48
Pts: F. Jackson 13		Pts: Tornikidu 25

United States Olympic Training Center, Colorado Springs

17 June 1985
20:00

Boxscore

Australia	72–84	Soviet Union
Scoring by half: 38-46, 34-38
Pts: K. Elsden 17		Pts: Tornikidu 16

United States Olympic Training Center, Colorado Springs

== Knockout stage ==
=== Bracket ===
5–8th place

5–8th place semifinals
A3	Spain	64
B4	Australia	76
B3	United States	84
A4	Canada	47

Fifth place
Australia	62
United States	72
Seventh place
Spain	67
Canada	78

Semifinals

Semifinals
A1	Yugoslavia	76
B2	Soviet Union	78
B1	South Korea	89
A2	China	78

Finals
Soviet Union	80
South Korea	75
Third place
Yugoslavia	86
China	63

=== Semi-finals ===
19 June 1985
13:00

Boxscore

Spain	64–76	Australia
Scoring by half: 34-40, 30-36
Pts: M. Messa 28		Pts: M. Timms 16

United States Olympic Training Center, Colorado Springs

19 June 1985
15:00

Boxscore

Canada	47–84	United States
Scoring by half: 36-47, 11-37
Pts: M. Kowal 26		Pts: M. Bolton 10

United States Olympic Training Center, Colorado Springs

19 June 1985
18:00

Boxscore

Yugoslavia	76–78 (OT)	Soviet Union
Scoring by half: 31-27, 35-39 Overtime: 10-12
Pts: B. Milosevic 36		Pts: Tornikidu 15

United States Olympic Training Center, Colorado Springs

19 June 1985
20:00

Boxscore

China	78–89	South Korea
Scoring by half: 33-50, 45-39
Pts: Z. Li 14		Pts: K. Choi 27

United States Olympic Training Center, Colorado Springs

=== Finals ===
21 August 1985
11:00

Report

Senegal	47–85	Cuba
Scoring by half: 25–46, 22–39
Pts: M. Mattymbengue 13		Pts: M. Molinet 19

Olympic Training Center, Colorado Springs

21 June 1985
13:00

Boxscore

Canada	67–78	Spain
Scoring by half: 33–44, 34–34
Pts: M. Kowal 18		Pts: T. Ruiz 18

United States Olympic Training Center, Colorado Springs

21 June 1985
15:00

Boxscore

United States	72–62	Australia
Scoring by half: 39–27, 33–35
Pts: M. Bolton 17		Pts: B. Slimmon 15

United States Olympic Training Center, Colorado Springs

21 June 1985
18:00

Boxscore

Yugoslavia	86–63	China
Scoring by half: 48–27, 38–36
Pts: A. Arbutina 32		Pts: W. Liu 11

United States Olympic Training Center, Colorado Springs

21 June 1985
20:00

Boxscore

Soviet Union	80–75	South Korea
Scoring by half: 45–41, 35–34
Pts: Gerlitz 27		Pts: K. Choi 20

United States Olympic Training Center, Colorado Springs

== Final standings ==
#	Team	W-L
	Soviet Union	5-1
	South Korea	4-2
	(Socialist Federal Republic of Yugoslavia) Yugoslavia	5-1
4	China	3-3
5	United States	4-2
6	Australia	2-4
7	Spain	3-3
8	Canada	1-5
9	Cuba	2-3
10	Senegal	0-5

== Awards ==
1985 FIBA Women's World Junior Championship winner

Soviet Union
First title
