= Slobodan Piva Ivković Award for Lifetime Achievement =

Basketball Award

- Sport: Basketball
- Awarded for: contributions over the whole of a basketball coaching career
- Local name: Награда за животно дело "Слободан Пива Ивковић" (Serbian)
- Location: Belgrade
- Country: (Federal Republic of Yugoslavia) Yugoslavia / Serbia and Montenegro (1995–2005); Serbia (2007–present)
- Presented by: Serbian Association of Basketball Coaches

History
- First award: 1995
- Editions: 19
- First winner: Slobodan Ivković; Borislav Stanković; Ranko Žeravica; Aleksandar Nikolić; Nebojša Popović
- Most recent: Aleksandar Đorđević; Marina Maljković (2023)
- Website: ukts.rs

The Slobodan Piva Ivković Award for Lifetime Achievement (Serbian: Награда за животно дело "Слободан Пива Ивковић", romanized: Nagrada za životno delo "Slobodan Piva Ivković") is a lifetime achievement award honoring the achievements of those basketball coaches who have made a significant contribution to the game of basketball in Serbia. It was first awarded in 1995. The awards are presented by the Serbian Association of Basketball Coaches and its named in honor of coach Slobodan Ivković who was the founder and the first president of the Association. All coaches with Serbian citizenship, regardless of where they coached in the world, qualify for the award. The inaugural Awards for Lifetime Achievement were presented to five recipients: Slobodan Ivković, Borislav Stanković, Ranko Žeravica, Aleksandar Nikolić, and Nebojša Popović. The most recent recipients of the award are Aleksandar Đorđević and Marina Maljković.

Marina Maljković in 2023 is the only female coach to have won the award. Her father, Božidar, won the award in 2005.

== Recipients ==
List of award recipients, showing the year and achievements
| Year | Recipients | Coaching career | Achievements | Refs. |
|---|---|---|---|---|
| 1995 | Slobodan Ivković | 1966–1995 | List of achievements: Yugoslav League champion (1973); Yugoslav Cup winner (1976) | |
| 1995 | Borislav Stanković | 1950–1970 | List of achievements: Naismith Memorial Basketball Hall of Fame member (as contributor) (1991); FIBA Hall of Fame member (as contributor) (2007); Women's Basketball Hall of Fame member (as contributor) (2000); Olympic Order (1987); Order of Merit of FR Germany (1987); National Order of the Lion (1999); Knight of the Legion of Honour (2001); Order of Merits of FR Yugoslavia (2002); Order of Honor of Republika Srpska (2010); FIBA Order of Merit (2015); 3× Yugoslav League champion (1958, 1960, 1964); Italian League champion (1968); Yugoslav Cup winner (1960) | |
| 1995 | Ranko Žeravica | 1954–2003 | List of achievements: FIBA Hall of Fame member (2007); Olympic Games gold medalist (1980); Olympic Games silver medalist (1968); FIBA Korać Cup champion (1978); Yugoslav League champion (1996) | |
| 1995 | Aleksandar Nikolić | 1951–1985 | List of achievements: Naismith Memorial Basketball Hall of Fame member (1998); FIBA Hall of Fame member (2007); FIBA Order of Merit (1995); 2× FIBA Intercontinental Cup champion (1970, 1973); 3× EuroLeague champion (1970, 1972, 1973); 50 Greatest EuroLeague Contributors (2008); 2× European Coach of the Year (1966, 1976); FIBA European Selection (1979); FIBA Cup Winners' Cup champion (1974); 3× Italian League champion (1970, 1972, 1973); 3× Italian Cup winner (1970, 1971, 1973); Yugoslav League champion (1963); Yugoslav Cup winner (1962) | |
| 1995 | Nebojša Popović | 1945–1955 | List of achievements: FIBA Hall of Fame member (as contributor) (2007); FIBA Order of Merit (1997); 10× Yugoslav Men's League champion (1946–1955); 7× Yugoslav Women's League champion (1946–1952) | |
| 1998 | Dušan Ivković | 1968–2016 | List of achievements: FIBA Hall of Fame member (2017); Olympic Games silver medal (1988); 3× FIBA EuroBasket Champion (1989, 1991, 1995); 1990 FIBA World Championship Champion; 2× EuroLeague champion (1996–97, 2011–12); Yugoslav League champion (1979); Yugoslav Cup winner (1979); FIBA Korać Cup champion (1979); 3× Greek League champion (1992, 1997, 2012); 4× Greek Cup winner (1997, 2000, 2001, 2011); Saporta Cup champion (2000); 3× Russian League champion (2003–2005); Russian League Coach of the Year (2004); Russian Cup winner (2005); EuroCup champion (2006); EuroLeague Coach of the Year (2012); Greek League Best Coach (2012); Turkish Cup winner (2015); Turkish President's Cup winner (2015); 50 Greatest EuroLeague Contributors (2008); EuroLeague Basketball Legend Award (2017) | |
| 1999 | Željko Obradović | 1991–present | List of achievements: 9× EuroLeague champion (1992, 1994, 1995, 2000, 2002, 2007, 2009, 2011, 2017); 2× FIBA Saporta Cup champion (1997, 1999); Yugoslav League champion (1992); Catalan League champion (1994); 11× Greek League champion (2000, 2001, 2003–2011); 4× Turkish League champion (2014, 2016–2018); Yugoslav Cup winner (1992); 7× Greek Cup winner (2003, 2005–2009, 2012); 3× Turkish Cup winner (2016, 2019, 2020); Italian Super Cup winner (1997); 3× Turkish Presidential Cup winner (2013, 2016, 2017); 2× FIBA European Coach of the Year (1994, 1995); 3× EuroLeague Coach of the Year (2007, 2011, 2017); 4× Greek League Best Coach (2000, 2007, 2009, 2011); 2× Greek Cup Triple Crown winner (2007, 2009); Best Sports Coach in Greece (2009); Gomelsky Cup champion (2009); 50 Greatest EuroLeague Contributors | |
| 2000 | Milan Vasojević | 1965–1995 | List of achievements: FIBA Hall of Fame member (2022); 3× Yugoslavian Women's League champion (1961–1963); 3× Italian Women's League champion (1968, 1969, 1973); 2× Yugoslavian Women's Cup winner (1960, 1962) | |
| 2001 | Svetislav Pešić | 1982–2026 | List of achievements: FIBA Hall of Fame member (2020); Spanish AEEB Coach of the Year (2019); 3× Spanish King's Cup winner (2003, 2018, 2019); 2× Spanish League champion (2003, 2004); 5× German League champion (1997, 1998, 1999, 2000, 2014); 2× German Cup winner (1997, 1999); 3× German League Coach of the Year (1996, 1998, 1999); Korać Cup champion (1995); EuroLeague champion (2003); FIBA EuroCup champion (2007); Yugoslav Cup winner (1984); Yugoslav League champion (1983) | |
| 2002 | Borivoje Cenić | 1950–1995 | List of achievements: Yugoslav Women's League champion (1964, 1965, 1966, 1968) | |
| 2003 | Strahinja Alagić | 1947–1985 | List of achievements: EuroBasket Women silver medalist (1968); 10× Yugoslav Women's League champion (1958–1960, 1973, 1976–1981); Women's European Champions Cup winner (1979); 4× Yugoslav Women's Cup winner (1974, 1976, 1979, 1981) | |
| 2004 | Vladislav Lučić | 1967–2004 | List of achievements: FIBA Africa Championship gold medalist (1981); 2× YUBA League champion (1993, 1994); 3× Yugoslav Women's League champion (1984, 1985, 1989); Women's League of Serbia and Montenegro champion (2004); FR Yugoslav Cup winner (1999); 2× Serbia & Montenegro Women's Cup winner (2003, 2004); Yugoslav Women's Cup winner (1985) | |
| 2005 | Božidar Maljković | 1971–2013 | List of achievements: FIBA Intercontinental Cup champion (1996); 4× EuroLeague champion (1989, 1990, 1993, 1996); FIBA Korać Cup champion (2001); Spanish League champion (2005); Spanish Cup champion (1991); Greek Cup champion (1996); 3× Yugoslav League champion (1988–1990); Yugoslav Cup champion (1990); 2× French League champion (1993, 1994); 2× French Cup champion (1994, 1995); 2× French League Best Coach (1993, 1994); 50 Greatest EuroLeague Contributors (2008) | |
| 2007 | Borislav Ćorković | 1958–1993 | List of achievements: EuroBasket Women silver medalist (1978); Yugoslav League champion (1975–76, 1980–81) | |
| 2008 | Radomir Šaper | None | List of achievements: FIBA Hall of Fame member (as contributor) (2020); FIBA Order of Merit (1999) | |
| 2022 | Duško Vujošević | 1976–2021 | List of achievements: Euroleague Coach of the Year (2009); FIBA Korać Cup champion (1989); 5× Adriatic League champion (2007–2010, 2013); 6× Serbian League champion (2007–2010, 2013–2014); 5× Serbia-Montenegro League champion (2002–2006); Yugoslav League champion (1987); 3× Serbian Cup winner (2008–2010); 2× Yugoslav Cup winner (1989, 2002); Romanian Cup winner (2020) | |
| 2022 | Zoran Kovačić | 1967–2013 | List of achievements: Yugoslav League champion (1992); Yugoslav Women's Basketball Cup champion (1992); 2× Serbia and Montenegro League champion (1993, 2003); Serbia and Montenegro Cup winner (1994, 2000) | |
| 2023 | Aleksandar Đorđević | 2006–present | | |
| 2023 | Marina Maljković | 2004–present | | |

== See also ==
- List of lifetime achievement awards
