= Vladislav Lučić =

Serbian basketball player and coach

Personal information
- Born: 7 August 1941 (age 85) Belgrade, German-occupied Serbia

Career information
- NBA draft: 1963: undrafted
- Playing career: 1960–1967
- Coaching career: 1967–2004

Career history

Playing
- 1960–1965: Crvena zvezda

Coaching
- 1967–1970: Crvena zvezda youth
- 1970–1975, 1983–1985: Partizan (Women)
- 1985–1986: Partizan (Men)
- 1988–1990: Crvena zvezda (Women)
- 1990–1992: Challes-les-Eaux
- 1992–1994, 1997–1998: Crvena zvezda (Men)
- 1998–1999: Partizan (Men)
- 1999–2000: Crvena zvezda (Men)
- 2000–2004: Crvena zvezda (Women)

Career highlights
- 2× YUBA League champion (1993, 1994); 3× Yugoslav Women's League champion (1984, 1985, 1989); Women's League of Serbia and Montenegro champion (2004); FR Yugoslav Cup winner (1999); 2× Serbia & Montenegro Women's Cup winner (2003, 2004); Yugoslav Women's Cup winner (1985); Ivković Award for Lifetime Achievement (2004)
Medals
Men's basketball
Head coach for Ivory Coast
FIBA AfroBasket
| Gold medal – first place | 1981 Somalia | Team |

Vladislav "Lale" Lučić (Serbian Cyrillic: Владислав Лучић; born August 7, 1941) is a Serbian former professional basketball coach and player.

== Biography ==
He won 2 National Championships with Red Star Belgrade in 1992–93 and 1993–94 season and National Cup with KK Partizan in 1998–99 season. He was also head coach of Germany at Eurobasket 1995 and Eurobasket 1997.

== Career achievements ==
=== Men's Basketball ===
- YUBA League champion: 2 (with Crvena zvezda: 1992–93, 1993–94)
- FR Yugoslav Cup winner: 1 (with Partizan: 1998–99)
- Yugoslav Super Cup winner: 1 (with Crvena zvezda: 1993)

=== Women's Basketball ===
- Yugoslav League champion: 3 (with Partizan: 1983–84, 1984–85 and with Crvena zvezda: 1988–89)
- Yugoslav Cup winner: 1 (with Partizan: 1984–85)
- Serbia and Montenegro League champion: 1 (with Crvena zvezda: 2003–04)
- Serbia & Montenegro Cup winner: 2 (with Crvena zvezda: 2002–03, 2003–04)
- French League champion: 2 (with Challes-les-Eaux Savoie: 1990–91, 1991–92)

== National team's coaching record ==
| Year | National Team | Tournament | Standing | Pld | W | L |
|---|---|---|---|---|---|---|
| 1978 | Nigeria | Africa Championship | 6th | 5 | 2 | 3 |
| 1980 | Nigeria | Africa Championship | 10th | 5 | 1 | 4 |
| 1981 | Ivory Coast | Africa Championship | 1st | 7 | 6 | 1 |
| 1982 | Ivory Coast | World Championship | 13th | 7 | 0 | 7 |
| 1983 | Ivory Coast | Africa Championship | 4th | 6 | 3 | 3 |
| 1995 | Germany | EuroBasket | 10th | 6 | 1 | 5 |
| 1997 | Germany | EuroBasket | 12th | 8 | 1 | 7 |
| Total | | | | 44 | 14 | 30 |

== See also ==
- List of FIBA AfroBasket winning head coaches
- List of Red Star Belgrade basketball coaches
- List of KK Partizan head coaches

Sporting positions
| Preceded by Slobodan Vučićević | President of KK Crvena zvezda 2010 – 2011 | Succeeded by Nebojša Čović |
