= Yugoslavia women's national under-19 basketball team =

Yugoslavia
- FIBA zone: FIBA Europe
- National federation: Basketball Federation of Yugoslavia

World Championships
- Appearances: 2
- Medals: Silver: 1989; Bronze: 1985
Home	Away

The Yugoslavia women's national under-19 basketball team, commonly referred to as the Yugoslavia women's national junior basketball team (Serbo-Croatian: Mlada košarkaška reprezentacija Jugoslavije), was the girls' basketball team, administered by Basketball Federation of Yugoslavia, that represented SFR Yugoslavia in international under-19 (under age 19) women's basketball competitions, consisting mainly of the World Championship for Junior Women.

After the dissolution of SFR Yugoslavia in 1991, the successor countries all set up their own national under-19 teams.

== Individual awards ==
Top Scorer

- Danira Nakić – 1989

== Competitive record ==
Year	Pos.	GP	W	L	Ref.
(United States) 1985	Bronze medal	6	5	1	
(Spain) 1989	Silver medal	7	5	2	
Total	2/2	13	10	3	

== Coaches ==
Years	Head coach	Assistant coach(es)
1985	Vjećeslav Kavedžija	Zoran Kovačić
1989	Miodrag Vesković	Zoran Kovačić

== Rosters ==
1985 Championship	1989 Championship
4 Stojna Vangelovska; 5 Andrea Pukšić; 6 Eleonora Wild; 7 Danira Nakić; 8 Olivera Petrović; 9 Jasmina Alić; 10 Elmira Kalić; 11 Razija Mujanović; 12 Zaga Počeković; 13 Željana Listeš; 14 Anđelija Arbutina; 15 Bojana Milošević	4 Milanka Nedović; 5 Danijela Ilić; 6 Sergeja Zupan; 7 Eleonora Wild; 8 Marina Velimirović; 9 Danira Nakić; 10 Vesna Bajkuša; 11 Žana Lelas; 12 Nina Bjedov; 13 Sanja Vesel; 14 Romana Dukić; 15 Gordana Džolić

== New national teams ==
After the dissolution of SFR Yugoslavia in 1991, five new countries were created: Bosnia and Herzegovina, Croatia, Macedonia (in 2019, renamed to North Macedonia), FR Yugoslavia (in 2003, renamed to Serbia and Montenegro) and Slovenia. In 2006, Montenegro became an independent nation and Serbia became the legal successor of Serbia and Montenegro. In 2008, Kosovo declared independence from Serbia and became a FIBA member in 2015.

Here is a list of women's national under-19 teams on the SFR Yugoslavia area:

Country	FIBA affiliation	FIBA disaffiliation	Team
Bosnia and Herzegovina	1992	-	They have not played in any U19 tournament yet
Croatia	1992	-	They have not played in any U19 tournament yet
Kosovo	2015	-	They have not played in any U19 tournament yet
Montenegro	2006	-	They have not played in any U19 tournament yet
North Macedonia	1993	-	They have not played in any U19 tournament yet
Serbia	2006	-	U19 team
Serbia and Montenegro	1992	2006	U19 team
Slovenia	1992	-	U19 team

== See also ==
- Yugoslavia women's national under-18 basketball team
- Yugoslavia women's national under-16 basketball team
