= Borivoje Cenić =

Serbian basketball player and coach (1930–2021)

Personal information
- Born: 25 September 1930 Belgrade, Kingdom of Yugoslavia
- Died: 13 January 2021 (aged 90) Belgrade, Serbia

Career information
- Playing career: 1947–1951
- Coaching career: 1950–1995

Career history

Playing
- 1947–1948: Železničar Beograd
- 1948–1950: Radnički Belgrade
- 1950–1951: BASK

Coaching
- 1950–1959: Radnički Belgrade (men's youth)
- 1959–1962: Crvena zvezda (women's youth)
- 1960: Yugoslavia Women
- 1962–1968: Radnički Belgrade Women
- 1967–1969: Yugoslavia Women U18
- 1968–1969: OKK Beograd
- 1969–1970: OKK Beograd (assistant)
- 1970–1972: OKK Beograd
- 1972–1976: Yugoslavia Women
- 1973: Yugoslavia Women U18
- 1982–1983: Apollon Patras
- 1983–1986: Kazma
- 1986–1987: Partizan (youth)
- 1987–1988: Jagodina
- 1993–1995: OKK Beograd (youth)

Borivoje "Bora" Cenić (Serbian Cyrillic: Боривоје "Бора" Ценић; 25 September 1930 – 13 January 2021) was a Serbian professional basketball coach and player.

== Career achievements ==
- Yugoslav Women's League champion: 4 (with Radnički Belgrade: 1964, 1965, 1966, 1968)
- Slobodan Piva Ivković Award for Lifetime Achievement (2002)
