= Meta Štoka =

Yugoslav and Slovenian basketball player

Personal information
- Born: 23 June 1949 (age 77) Ljubljana, SFR Yugoslavia

Career history
- Olimpija
- Ježica
Medals
Women's basketball
Representing Yugoslavia
EuroBasket Women
Silver medal – second place	1968 Italy	Team
European U18 Championship
Bronze medal – third place	1967 Italy	Team

Meta Štoka (born 23 June 1949) is former a Yugoslav and Slovenian female professional basketball player.
