= 2024–25 Slovenian Women's Basketball League =

Women's basketball league in Slovenia

Slovenian Women's Basketball League
- Season: 2024–25
- Dates: Regular season: 25 September 2024 – 29 March 2025; Play Offs: 5–23 April 2025

Regular season
- Season MVP: (Brazil) Thayna Silva

Finals
- Champions: Cinkarna Celje (21st title)
- Runners-up: Triglav Kranj
- Finals MVP: (Brazil) Thayna Silva

Statistical leaders
Points	(United States) Nylah Young	20.9
Rebounds	(United States) Nylah Young	9.4
Assists	(Slovenia) Tiana Meglic Steharnik	6.1
Steals	(Slovenia) Tiana Meglic Steharnik	3.4
Blocks	(Bosnia and Herzegovina) Jana Guska	0.9

The 2024–25 Slovenian Women's Basketball League is the 34th season of the top division women's basketball league in Slovenia since its establishment in 1991. It starts in September 2024 with the first round of the regular season and ends in April 2025.

Cinkarna Celje are the defending champions.

Cinkarna Celje won their 21st title after beating Triglav Kranj in the final.

== Format ==
Each team plays each other three times. The top four teams qualify for the play offs. The semifinals are played as a best of three series while the final is played as a best of five series.

== Regular season ==
Pos	Team	Pld	W	L	PF	PA	PD	Pts	Qualification
1	Cinkarna Celje	18	18	0	1681	1003	+678	36	Play Offs
2	Triglav Kranj	18	12	6	1221	1098	+123	30	Play Offs
3	Ilirija	18	11	7	1183	1187	−4	29 (Note: Ilirija 2–1 Maribor)	Play Offs
4	Maribor	18	11	7	1247	1257	−10	29	Play Offs
5	Ježica	18	5	13	1163	1412	−249	23	
6	Domel	18	3	15	1024	1376	−352	21	
7	Domžale	18	3	15	1163	1349	−186	21	

Source: Slovenian Women's Basketball League
Rules for classification: 1) Points; 2) Points difference; 3) Points scored.

== Play offs ==
Semifinals	Final
1	Cinkarna Celje	96	70	2
4	Maribor	55	63	0
1	Cinkarna Celje	79	74	77	3
2	Triglav Kranj	58	67	59	0
2	Triglav Kranj	54	73	61	2
3	Ilirija	61	48	45	1

Champions of Slovenia

Cinkarna Celje
21st title
