= Danica Guberinič =

Yugoslav and Slovenian basketball player

Personal information
- Born: June 15, 1955 (age 71) Domžale, SFR Yugoslavia

Career history
- Olimpija
- Ježica
Medals
Women's basketball
Representing Yugoslavia
EuroBasket Women
Silver medal – second place	1978 Poland	Team

Danica Nana Guberinič (born June 15, 1955) is former a Yugoslav and Slovenian female professional basketball player.
