= Tima Džebo =

Yugoslav and Bosnian basketball player (1963–2025)

Personal information
- Born: 24 October 1963 Olovo, SR Bosnia and Herzegovina, SFR Yugoslavia
- Died: 13 July 2025 (aged 61) Sarajevo, Bosnia and Herzegovina

Career history
- 1980–1982: Stupčanica
- 1982–1987: Željezničar Sarajevo
- 1987–1990: Elemes Šibenik
- 1990–1992: Jedinstvo Aida
- 1993–1995: Ježica
- ?: ?
- ?: Jedinstvo Tuzla
Medals
Women's basketball
Representing (Socialist Federal Republic of Yugoslavia) Yugoslavia
FIBA World Cup
Silver medal – second place	1990 Malaysia
Representing Bosnia and Herzegovina
Mediterranean Games
Gold medal – first place	1993 France

Tima Džebo (née Imširović; 24 October 1963 – 13 July 2025) was a Yugoslav and Bosnian basketball player. She represented Yugoslavia and won a silver at the 1990 FIBA World Championship for Women in Malaysia, and later won a gold while representing Bosnia and Herzegovina at the 1993 Mediterranean Games. Džebo died on 13 July 2025, at the age of 61.
