= 1965 FIBA European Championship for Junior Women =

1st FIBA Under-18 Women's European Basketball Championship

Tournament details
- Host country: Bulgaria
- Dates: 22–29 August 1965
- Teams: 11
- Venues: 4 (in 4 host cities)

Final positions
- Champions: Soviet Union (1st title)

The 1965 FIBA European Championship for Junior Women was the first edition of the European basketball championship for U18 women's teams, today known as FIBA U18 Women's European Championship. It was played in Bulgaria in four cities Kyustendil, Lom, Botevgrad and Sofia, from 22 to 29 August 1965. Soviet Union women's national under-18 basketball team won the tournament.

== Participating teams ==
- Bulgaria
- Czechoslovakia
- East Germany
- France
- Hungary
- Italy
- Poland
- Romania
- Soviet Union
- Yugoslavia
- West Germany

== First round ==
In the first round, the teams were drawn into three groups. The first two teams from each group advance to the Final round; the other teams will play in the 7th–11th place classification.

=== Group A ===
Pos	Team	Pld	W	L	PF	PA	PD	Pts	Qualification
1	Soviet Union	3	3	0	219	88	+131	6	Final round
2	Yugoslavia	3	2	1	193	117	+76	5	Final round
3	Romania	3	1	2	102	147	−45	4	Classification round
4	West Germany	3	0	3	52	214	−162	3	Classification round

Source: FIBA Archive

22 August 1965

Boxscore

Soviet Union	87–13	West Germany

22 August 1965

Boxscore

Romania	31–62	Yugoslavia

23 August 1965

Boxscore

Soviet Union	72–49	Yugoslavia

23 August 1965

Boxscore

Romania	45–25	West Germany

24 August 1965

Boxscore

Yugoslavia	82–14	West Germany

24 August 1965

Boxscore

Soviet Union	60–26	Romania

=== Group B ===
Pos	Team	Pld	W	L	PF	PA	PD	Pts	Qualification
1	Bulgaria	3	3	0	174	133	+41	6	Final round
2	Hungary	3	2	1	164	160	+4	5	Final round
3	East Germany	3	1	2	134	149	−15	4	Classification round
4	France	3	0	3	145	175	−30	3	Classification round

Source: FIBA Archive

22 August 1965

Boxscore

Bulgaria	71–50	France

22 August 1965

Boxscore

East Germany	55–56	Hungary

23 August 1965

Boxscore

France	54–60	Hungary

23 August 1965

Boxscore

Bulgaria	52–35	East Germany

24 August 1965

Boxscore

East Germany	44–41	France

24 August 1965

Boxscore

Hungary	48–51	Bulgaria

=== Group C ===
Pos	Team	Pld	W	L	PF	PA	PD	Pts	Qualification
1	Czechoslovakia	2	2	0	147	84	+63	4	Final round
2	Poland	2	1	1	141	82	+59	3	Final round
3	Italy	2	0	2	38	160	−122	2	Classification round

Source: FIBA Archive

22 August 1965

Boxscore

Poland	79–16	Italy

23 August 1965

Boxscore

Czechoslovakia	81–22	Italy

24 August 1965

Boxscore

Czechoslovakia	66–62	Poland

== Classification round ==
Pos	Team	Pld	W	L	PF	PA	PD	Pts
7	Romania	4	3	1	227	164	+63	7
8	France	4	3	1	226	151	+75	7
9	East Germany	4	3	1	228	188	+40	7
10	Italy	4	1	3	173	226	−53	5
11	West Germany	4	0	4	116	241	−125	4

Source: FIBA Archive

26 August 1965

Boxscore

West Germany	37–73	East Germany

26 August 1965

Boxscore

Italy	35–66	France

27 August 1965

Boxscore

East Germany	62–44	Italy

27 August 1965

Boxscore

France	51–48	Romania

28 August 1965

Boxscore

Romania	68–39	Italy

28 August 1965

Boxscore

France	68–24	West Germany

29 August 1965

Boxscore

East Germany	49–66	Romania

29 August 1965

Boxscore

Italy	55–30	West Germany

== Final round ==
Pos	Team	Pld	W	L	PF	PA	PD	Pts
1	Soviet Union	5	5	0	377	252	+125	10
2	Yugoslavia	5	3	2	314	313	+1	8
3	Czechoslovakia	5	3	2	311	310	+1	8
4	Poland	5	2	3	274	290	−16	7
5	Bulgaria	5	2	3	293	323	−30	7
6	Hungary	5	0	5	257	338	−81	5

Source: FIBA Archive

26 August 1965

Boxscore

Poland	44–67	Soviet Union

26 August 1965

Boxscore

Bulgaria	70–64	Yugoslavia

26 August 1965

Boxscore

Czechoslovakia	63–53	Hungary

27 August 1965

Boxscore

Yugoslavia	53–51	Poland

27 August 1965

Boxscore

Bulgaria	58–69	Czechoslovakia

27 August 1965

Boxscore

Hungary	42–85	Soviet Union

28 August 1965

Boxscore

Hungary	61–83	Yugoslavia

28 August 1965

Boxscore

Soviet Union	72–54	Czechoslovakia

28 August 1965

Boxscore

Poland	61–51	Bulgaria

29 August 1965

Boxscore

Hungary	53–56	Poland

29 August 1965

Boxscore

Yugoslavia	65–59	Czechoslovakia

29 August 1965

Boxscore

Bulgaria	63–81	Soviet Union

== Final standings ==
Rank	Team
1st place, gold medalist(s)	Soviet Union
2nd place, silver medalist(s)	Yugoslavia
3rd place, bronze medalist(s)	Czechoslovakia
4	Poland
5	Bulgaria
6	Hungary
7	Romania
8	France
9	East Germany
10	Italy
11	West Germany
