= Zvizdić =

Zvizdić is a surname of Bosnian origin. Notable people with the surname include:

- Denis Zvizdić (born 1964), Bosnian politician
- Hasan Zvizdić (1892–1980), Bosnian Muslim militia leader
- Ilvana Zvizdić (born 1971), Bosnian basketball player

== See also ==
- Anđeo Zvizdović (c. 1420–1498), Franciscan friar and evangelist in medieval Bosnia
