= Carmen Tyson-Thomas =

American basketball player

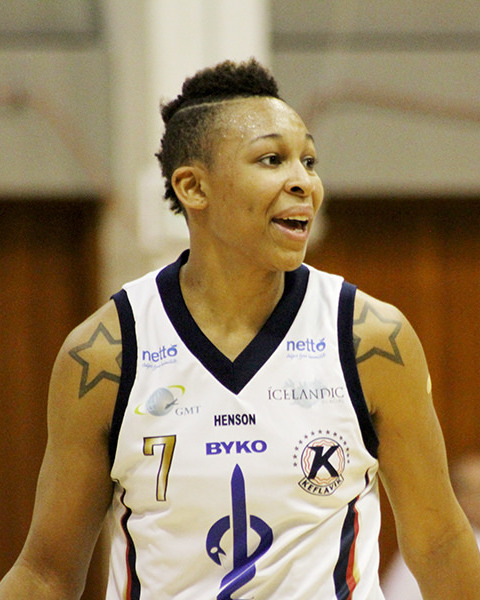
- Tyson-Thomas in Keflavík uniform.

Torpan Pojat
- Position: Shooting guard
- League: Naisten Korisliiga

Personal information
- Born: January 10, 1991 (age 35) Philadelphia, Pennsylvania
- Listed height: 175 cm (5 ft 9 in)

Career information
- High school: Conwell–Egan
- College: Syracuse (2009–2013)
- Playing career: 2013–present
- Number: 7, 10, 14, 44

Career history
- 2013–2014: ZKK Athlete Celje
- 2014: Los Leones Quilpe
- 2014–2015: Keflavík
- 2015–2017: Njarðvík
- 2017–2018: Skallagrímur
- 2018: Eastern Mavericks
- 2018: Colegio Los Leones Quilpe
- 2018: Ferroviario Maputo
- 2019: Eastern Mavericks
- 2021–2022: Tapiolan Honka
- 2022–2023: Espoo Team
- 2023–present: Torpan Pojat

Career highlights
- FIBA Africa Clubs Champions Cup (2018); Slovenian champion (2014); Slovenian All-Star (2014); Slovenian All-Star MVP (2014); Chilean champion (2014); 2× Úrvalsdeild scoring leader (2017, 2018); 2× Premier League All Star Five (2018, 2019); 2× Premier League scoring leader (2018, 2019); Premier League rebounds leader (2018); Naisten Korisliiga scoring leader (2022); Naisten Korisliiga rebounds leader (2022); Big East Sixth Player of the Year (2013); Big East All-Freshman Team (2010)

Carmen Virginia Tyson-Thomas (born January 10, 1991) is an American basketball player. She won both the Slovenian and Chilean championship in 2014 and led the Icelandic Úrvalsdeild kvenna in scoring in 2017 and 2018. In 2018, she won the FIBA Africa Clubs Champions Cup with Ferroviario Maputo.

== College ==
Tyson-Thomas played for Syracuse from 2009 to 2013, averaging 8.9 points in 136 games.

== Professional career ==
Tyson-Thomas became a Slovenian champion on April 16, 2014, with ZKK Athlete Celje after beating ZKK Triglav Kranj in the finals. In July 2014, Tyson-Thomas helped Los Leones Quilpe win the Chilean championship after scoring 38 points in the title clinching game.

She joined Keflavík of the Icelandic Úrvalsdeild kvenna prior the 2014–2015 season. She helped Keflavík to the Basketball Cup final. She played the game despite a broken rib, but was unable to prevent a loss to Grindavík. Keflavík also made it to the Úrvalsdeild finals but lost 0–3 to Snæfell.

In December 2015, Tyson-Thomas signed with Njarðvík of the Icelandic Division I. In nine games, she averaged league leading 36.1 points and 17.8 rebounds. Despite her play, Njarðvík missed the playoffs. However, in June, 2016, the club was offered a vacant spot in the Úrvalsdeild kvenna due to Hamar's withdrawal from the league.

Thomas started the season with stellar play and was named the best player of the first half of the season by the Icelandic Basketball Federation. Despite leading the league in scoring with 36.7 points per game, Njarðvík cut its ties with Tyson-Thomas in March, siding communication difficulties with her. Furthermore, Njarðvík's head coach, Agnar Gunnarsson, criticized her for belittling her teammates and claimed she thought she was bigger than the club. In turn, Tyson-Thomas denied the allegation and criticized the head coach for his words, saying that her teammates fought against her firing.

In July 2017, Tyson-Thomas signed with Skallagrímur.

After Skallagrímur was knocked out of the 2018 Úrvalsdeild playoffs, Tyson-Thomas signed with the Eastern Mavericks of the Australian Premier League. She went on to lead the league in scoring and rebounds with 25.3 points and 14.3 rebounds per game and was named to the Premier League All Star Five.

In November 2018, Tyson-Thomas signed with Ferroviario Maputo in Mozambique. On November 25, she won the FIBA Africa Clubs Champions Cup with the club, scoring 20 points in Ferroviario's 59–56 victory against Inter Clube in the finals. She made the go-ahead three point shot with 42 seconds remaining, giving Ferroviario a 58–56 lead.

She returned to the Eastern Mavericks for the 2019 season where she averaged league leading 27.6 points in 21 games. She was again named to the Premier League All Star Five while also being awarded the Halls Medal.

In 2020 she signed with the Norwood Flames of the Premier League, which had been rebranded as NBL1 Central. Before the start of the 2020 season, it was canceled due to the coronavirus pandemic in Australia.

== Awards and accomplishments ==
=== Club honours ===
- Slovenian champion: 2014
- Chilean champion: 2014

=== Individual awards ===
- Slovenian All-Star: 2014
- Slovenian All-Star MVP: 2014
- Úrvalsdeild scoring champion: 2017, 2018
- Icelandic D1 scoring champion: 2016
- Icelandic D1 rebounding champion: 2016

== Statistics ==
=== College statistics ===
Legend
GP	Games played	GS	Games started	MPG	Minutes per game
FG%	Field goal percentage	3P%	3-point field goal percentage	FT%	Free throw percentage
RPG	Rebounds per game	APG	Assists per game	SPG	Steals per game
BPG	Blocks per game	PPG	Points per game	**Bold**	Career high

Year	Team	GP	Points	FG%	3P%	FT%	RPG	APG	SPG	BPG	PPG
2009-10	Syracuse	36	205	36.5%	**29.4%**	73.2%	5.3	1.0	1.0	0.3	5.7
2010-11	Syracuse	35	300	38.6%	26.3%	74.1%	6.7	1.3	1.1	0.3	8.6
2011-12	Syracuse	**37**	**395**	33.1%	22.2%	**85.0%**	**7.8**	1.6	**2.0**	**0.5**	**10.7**
2012-13	Syracuse	31	330	**39.9%**	29.1%	73.1%	6.2	**2.0**	1.6	0.4	10.6
Career		139	1230	36.6%	11.1%	76.8%	8.5	1.4	1.4	0.4	8.8
