= Brad Hill (basketball) =

Australian basketball player

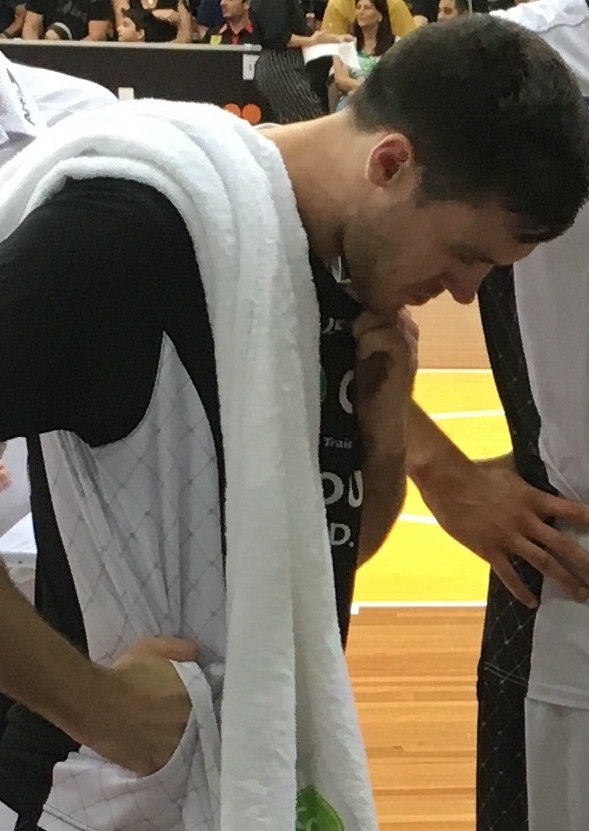
- Hill with Melbourne United in 2015

Personal information
- Born: 19 November 1986 (age 39) Hahndorf, South Australia, Australia
- Listed height: 198 cm (6 ft 6 in)
- Listed weight: 90 kg (198 lb)

Career information
- High school: Heathfield (Heathfield, South Australia)
- Playing career: 2004–2018
- Position: Small forward / shooting guard
- Coaching career: 2018–present

Career history

Playing
- 2004–2005: Australian Institute of Sport
- 2004–2007: Adelaide 36ers
- 2006–2011: Eastern Mavericks
- 2007–2008: South Dragons
- 2008–2011: Adelaide 36ers
- 2011–2013: Cairns Taipans
- 2012–2018: Mount Gambier Pioneers
- 2013–2014: Sydney Kings
- 2014–2015: Wollongong Hawks
- 2015–2016: Melbourne United

Coaching
- 2018–2021: Cairns Taipans (assistant)
- 2019: Cairns Marlins (assistant)

Career highlights
- 3× SEABL champion (2014, 2015, 2017); SEABL Grand Final MVP (2014)

Brad Hill (born 19 November 1986) is an Australian former professional basketball player who played in the National Basketball League (NBL) and the South East Australian Basketball League (SEABL).

== Professional career ==
In 2004 and 2005, Hill attended the Australian Institute of Sport (AIS) and played for the AIS men's team in the South East Australian Basketball League (SEABL).

Hill made his NBL debut during the 2004/05 season for the Adelaide 36ers. After three seasons with the 36ers, Hill joined the South Dragons in 2007. However, due to injury, he appeared in just four games for the Dragons. In 2008, he re-joined the 36ers and played with them until 2011. During this time, between 2006 and 2011, Hill played in the SA State League for the Eastern Mavericks.

Between 2011 and 2013, Hill played for the Cairns Taipans. He finished his NBL career with stints in Sydney (2013/14), Wollongong (2014/15), and Melbourne (2015/16).

Hill made his debut for the Mount Gambier Pioneers of the SEABL in 2012. He became a key member of the Pioneers incredible run of 5 National finals and 3 National Championships between 2013 and 2017. After a degenerative ankle injury ended his 2018 SEABL campaign with the Pioneers, Hill retired from playing.

== Coaching career ==
In 2018, Hill joined the Cairns Taipans as an assistant coach. In 2019, he joined the Taipans' QBL feeder team, the Cairns Marlins, as an assistant coach.
