= 1988–89 FIBA Women's European Champions Cup =

International basketball competition

The 1988–89 FIBA Women's European Champions Cup was the 31st edition of FIBA Europe's competition for national champions women's basketball clubs, running from September 1988 to 22 March 1989. The final featured clash between earlier 1987–88 season reigning champion Primigi Vicenza from Vicenza (Italy) and third place Jedinstvo Aida from Tuzla (then Yugoslav champion from Bosnia and Herzegovina). Jedinstvo Aida won a final game played in Florence for the first time in club's history, to become the second YU club to win the competition. Dynamo Novosibirsk and Astarac Mirande came third and fourth respectively.

== Finals ==
Final game took place in Florence on 22 March 1989.

Team #1		Team #2
Jedinstvo Aida (Socialist Federal Republic of Yugoslavia)	74–70	(Italy) Primigi Vicenza

== Road to finals ==
Schedule and Results – 1988–1989 European Cup for Women's Champion Clubs, per FIBA Europe website (Note: Schedule & Results – 1988/89 European Cup for Women's Champion Clubs – Data per FIBA Europe website.)

=== Qualifying round ===
Team #1	1st	2nd	Team #2	Agg.
Primigi Vicenza (Italy)	bye as reigning champion 1988.			
DBB Wien (Austria)	79–87	53–73	(Spain) Caixa Tarragona	
Elitzur Holon (Israel)	53–70	57–84	(Socialist Federal Republic of Yugoslavia) Jedinstvo Aida	
BCS Sporting Luxembourg	48–63	58–71	(Switzerland) CVJM Birsfelden	
Dynamo Novosibirsk (Soviet Union)	133–67	113–61	(Finland) Sampo Basket	
Galatasaray Istanbul (Turkey)	73–58	64–77	(Romania) Universitatea Cluj	
CIF Lisboa (Portugal)	50–83	52–85	(France) Astarac Mirande	
Hoybraten BK (Norway)	72–84	61–108	(Sweden) Solna IF	
CS 17 Nentori Tirana (Albania)	73–103	70–112	(Bulgaria) Levski-Spartak Sofia	
HOI Den Helder (Netherlands)	81–75	70–72	(West Germany) Agon 08 Dusseldorf	
Vysoke Školy (Czechoslovakia)	99–42	88–58	(England) Avon BC Northampton	
AO Sporting Athens (Greece)	47–71	56–73	(Hungary) BSE Budapest	

=== Round of 12 ===
Team #1	1st	2nd	Team #2	Agg.
Caixa Tarragona (Spain)	59–77	61–73	(Italy) Primigi Vicenza	
CVJM Birsfelden (Switzerland)	49–109	58–113	(Socialist Federal Republic of Yugoslavia) Jedinstvo Aida	
Galatasaray Istanbul (Turkey)	58–110	62–82	(Soviet Union) Dynamo Novosibirsk	
Solna IF (Sweden)	79–76	57–69	(France) Astarac Mirande	
Levski-Spartak Sofia (Bulgaria)	87–47	75–69	(Netherlands) HOI Den Helder	
Vysoke Školy (Czech Republic)	88–72	73–65	(Hungary) BSE Budapest	

=== Round of 6 ===
Team #1	1st	2nd	Team #2	Agg.
Jedinstvo Aida (Socialist Federal Republic of Yugoslavia)	84–56	80–68	(France) Astarac Mirande	
Dynamo Novosibirsk (Soviet Union)	89–78	85–73	(Bulgaria) Levski-Spartak Sofia	
Vysoke Školy (Czech Republic)	64–72	59–65	(Italy) Primigi Vicenza	
Primigi Vicenza (Italy)	64–50	93–67	(Soviet Union) Dynamo Novosibirsk	
Jedinstvo Tuzla (Socialist Federal Republic of Yugoslavia)	73–66	64–58	(Bulgaria) Levski-Spartak Sofia	
Astarac Mirande (France)	73–76	68–62	(Czech Republic) Visoke Školy	
Dynamo Novosibirsk (Soviet Union)	101–88	77–73	(Socialist Federal Republic of Yugoslavia) Jedinstvo Aida	
Primigi Vicenza (Italy)	58–54	66–79	(France) Astarac Mirande	
Levski-Spartak Sofia (Bulgaria)	77–55	83–71	(Czech Republic) Visoke Školy	
Astarac Mirande (France)	99–67	73–87	(Soviet Union) Dynamo Novosibirsk	
Visoke Školy (Czech Republic)	58–67	61–65	(Socialist Federal Republic of Yugoslavia) Jedinstvo Aida	
Levski-Spartak Sofia (Bulgaria)	50–64	52–74	(Italy) Primigi Vicenza	
Dynamo Novosibirsk (Soviet Union)	112–64	69–70	(Czech Republic) Visoke Školy	
Astarac Mirande (France)	90–74	65–69	(Bulgaria) Levski-Spartak Sofia	
Jedinstvo Tuzla (Socialist Federal Republic of Yugoslavia)	75–70	52–77	(Italy) Primigi Vicenza	

=== Group stage standings ===
Team	Pld	W	L	PF	PA
(Italy) Primigi Vicenza	10	8	2	703	602
(Socialist Federal Republic of Yugoslavia) Jedinstvo Aida	10	7	3	721	692
(Soviet Union) Dynamo Novosibirsk	10	6	4	804	746
(France) Astarac Mirande	10	4	6	725	723
(Bulgaria) Levski-Spartak Sofia	10	3	7	680	730
(Czech Republic) Vysoke Školy	10	2	8	640	751
