= East Germany women's national under-18 basketball team =

East Germany
- FIBA zone: FIBA Europe
- National federation: Basketball Federation of East Germany

U18 European Championship
- Appearances: 1
- Medals: None

The East Germany women's national under-18 basketball team was the girls' national basketball team of East Germany. Their only championship participation was the 1965 FIBA European Championship for Junior Women, where they finished in ninth place.

== Team results ==
22 August 1965

Boxscore

East Germany	55–56	Hungary

23 August 1965

Boxscore

Bulgaria	52–35	East Germany

24 August 1965

Boxscore

East Germany	44–41	France

26 August 1965

Boxscore

West Germany	37–73	East Germany

27 August 1965

Boxscore

East Germany	62–44	Italy

29 August 1965

Boxscore

East Germany	49–66	Romania

== See also ==
- East Germany women's national basketball team
