= 1989 FIBA Under-19 World Championship for Women =

1989 FIBA Under-19 Women's Basketball World Cup
Tournament details
- Host country: Spain
- Dates: July 23–30
- Teams: 12 (from 5 federations)

Final positions
- Champions: Soviet Union (2nd title)

The 1989 FIBA Under-19 World Championship for Women (Spanish: 1989 Campeonato Mundial FIBA Sub-19 Femenino) took place in Spain from 23 to 30 July 1989. It was co-organised by the International Basketball Federation (FIBA) and Spanish Basketball Federation.

Twelve national teams competed for the championship. Soviet Union came away with the Gold medal by defeating Yugoslavia 109-93 in the final.

== Venues ==
- Bilbao

== Competing nations ==
Except Spain, which automatically qualified as the host nation, the 11 remaining countries qualified through their continents’ qualifying tournaments:

FIBA Africa (1)

- Zaire

FIBA Asia (2)

- China
- South Korea

FIBA Americas (3)

- Brazil
- Cuba
- United States

FIBA Oceania (1)

- Australia

FIBA Europe (5)

- Spain (Host)
- Soviet Union
- Yugoslavia
- Czechoslovakia
- Bulgaria

== Final standings ==
#	Team	W-L
	Soviet Union	7-0
	(Socialist Federal Republic of Yugoslavia) Yugoslavia	5-2
	Australia	5-2
4	Czechoslovakia	4-3
5	Spain	5-2
6	South Korea	4-3
7	United States	3-4
8	Brazil	2-5
9	China	2-5
10	Cuba	2-5
11	Bulgaria	3-4
12	Zaire	0-7

== Awards ==
1989 FIBA Women's World Junior Championship winner

Soviet Union
Second title
