= Eastern Mavericks =

- Nickname: Mavs
- Leagues: NBL1 Central
- Founded: 1995
- Arena: St Francis de Sales Community Sports Centre
- Location: Mount Barker, South Australia
- Team colors: Grey, Maroon, Orange, White
- President: Daniel Wray
- Vice-president: Maddy Robinson-Byrne
- Head coach: Men: Ryan Meakin (2024-current); Women: Nathon Jones
- Championships: 1 (2004) (M)
- Website: NBL1.com.au

Eastern Mavericks is a NBL1 Central club based in Mount Barker, South Australia. The club fields both a men's and women's team. The club is a division of the overarching Eastern Mavericks District Basketball Club (EMDBC), the major administrative basketball organisation in the Adelaide Hills region. The Mavericks play their home games at St Francis de Sales Community Sports Centre.

== Club history ==
The Eastern Mavericks District Basketball Club was established in 1995 following the amalgamation of the Murray Bridge Bullets and the Mt Lofty Spurs, both of whom were based in the Adelaide Hills and Murraylands region. The Mavericks entered men's and women's senior representative teams into the SA State League, which later became the central conference of the Continental Basketball Association (CBA).

The club's first and so far only championship came in 2004 when the men's team defeated the Woodville Warriors 93–80 in the Central ABL grand final.

== Awards ==
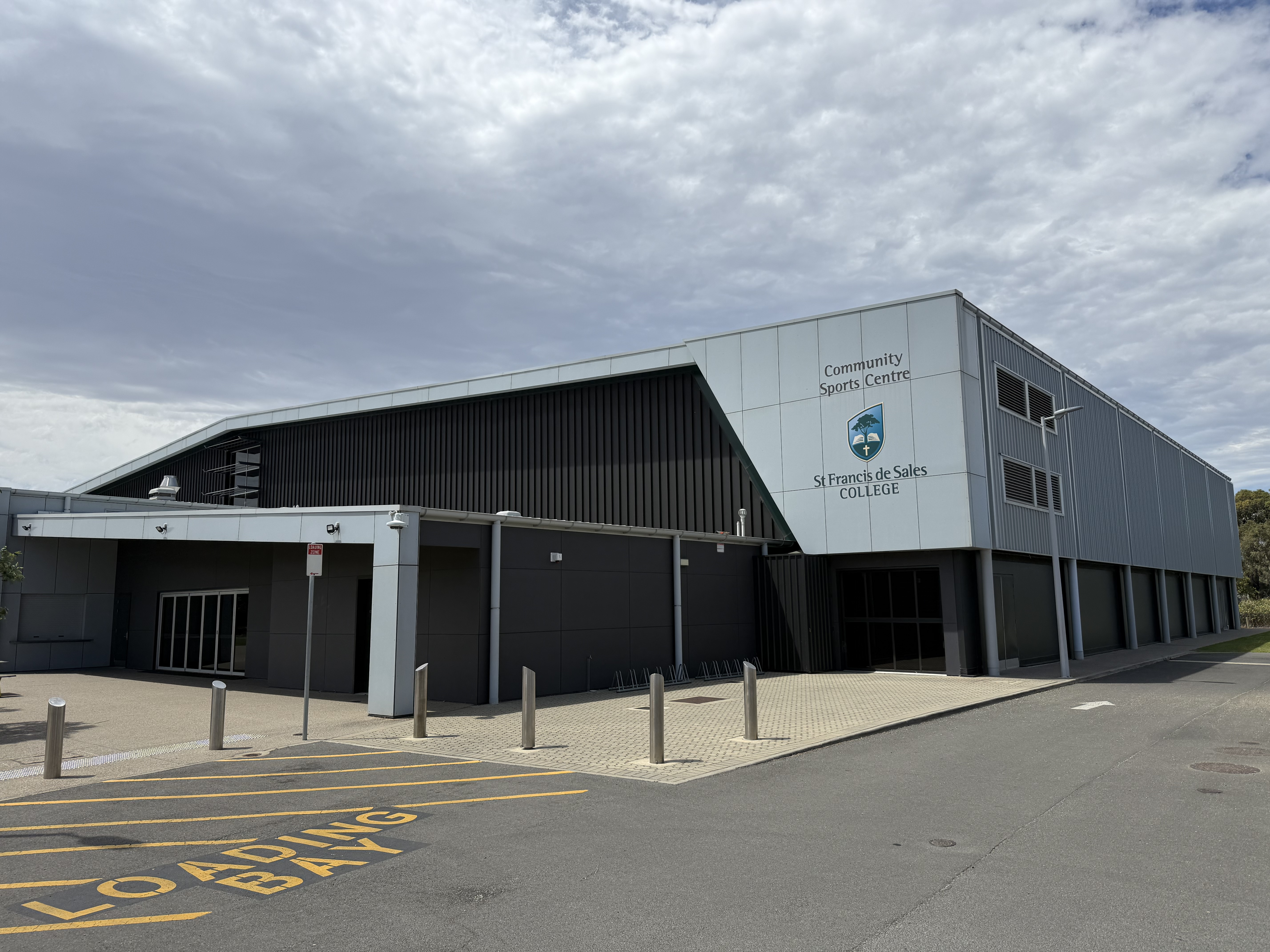
St Francis de Sales Community Sports Centre, January 2026

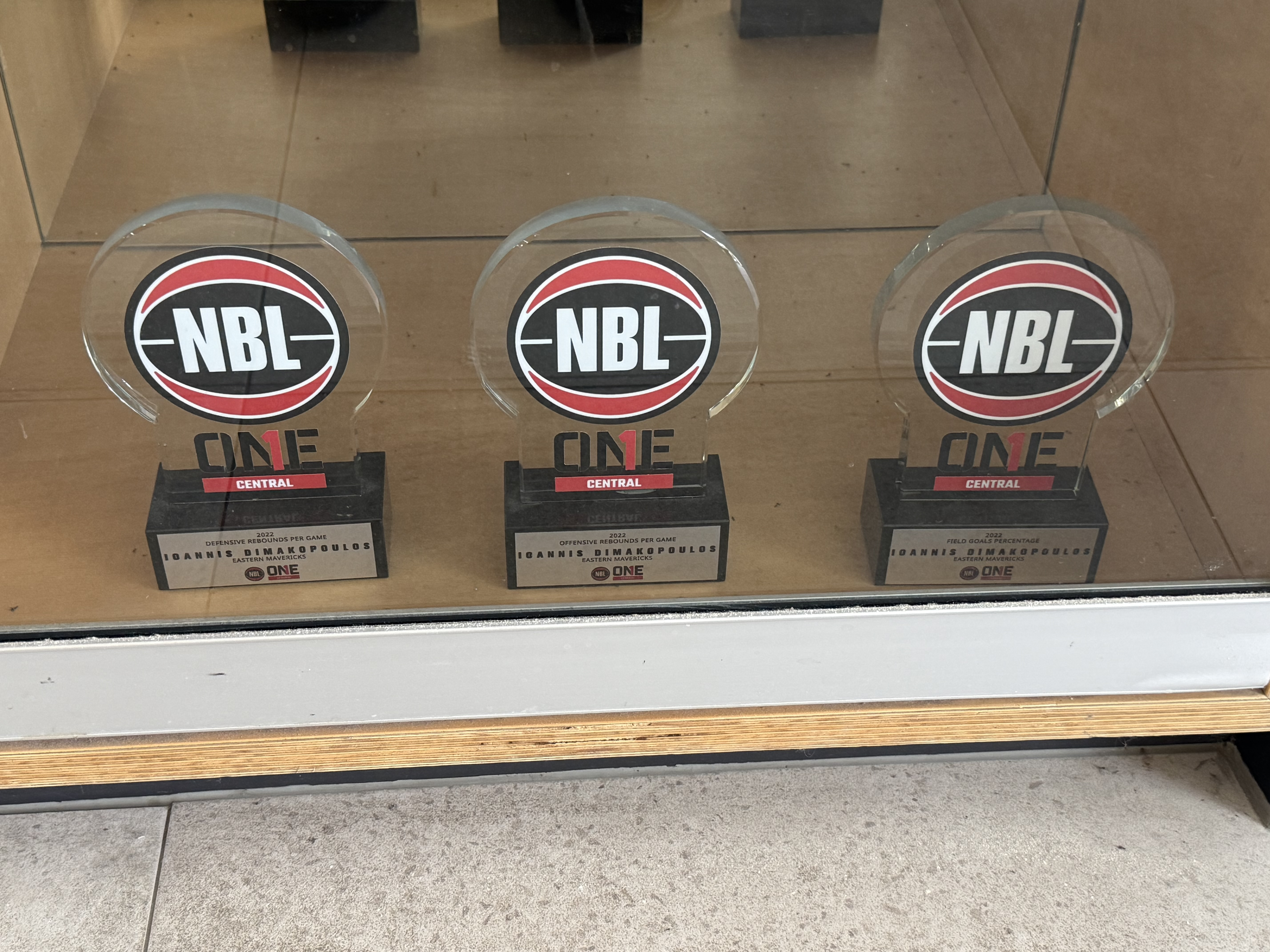
Ioannis Dimakopoulos' 2022 NBL1 Central trophies

=== Men ===
All Star Five

- Jacob Holmes (2002, 2003, 2004)
- Brad Hill (2006, 2009, 2010)

Frank Angove Medal

- Jason Warhurst (1996)
- Jacob Holmes (2002)
- Brad Hill (2006)

Coach of the Year

- Richard Hill (2005)

Woollacott Medal

- Jacob Holmes (2003, 2004)

=== Women ===
All Star Five

- Cayla George (2005, 2008)
- Tess Madgen (2010, 2012, 2013)
- Carmen Tyson-Thomas (2018, 2019)

Merv Harris Medal

- Cayla George (2008)
- Tess Madgen (2010)

Coach of the Year

- Michael Williams (2005)

Halls Medal

- Cayla George (2008)
- Tess Madgen (2010)
- Carmen Tyson-Thomas (2019)

Most Valuable Player

- Cayla George (2005, 2008)
- Tess Madgen (2010, 2012, 2013)
