= Ioannis Dimakopoulos (basketball) =

Greek professional basketball player

Ioannis Dimakopoulos Ιωάννης Δημακόπουλος
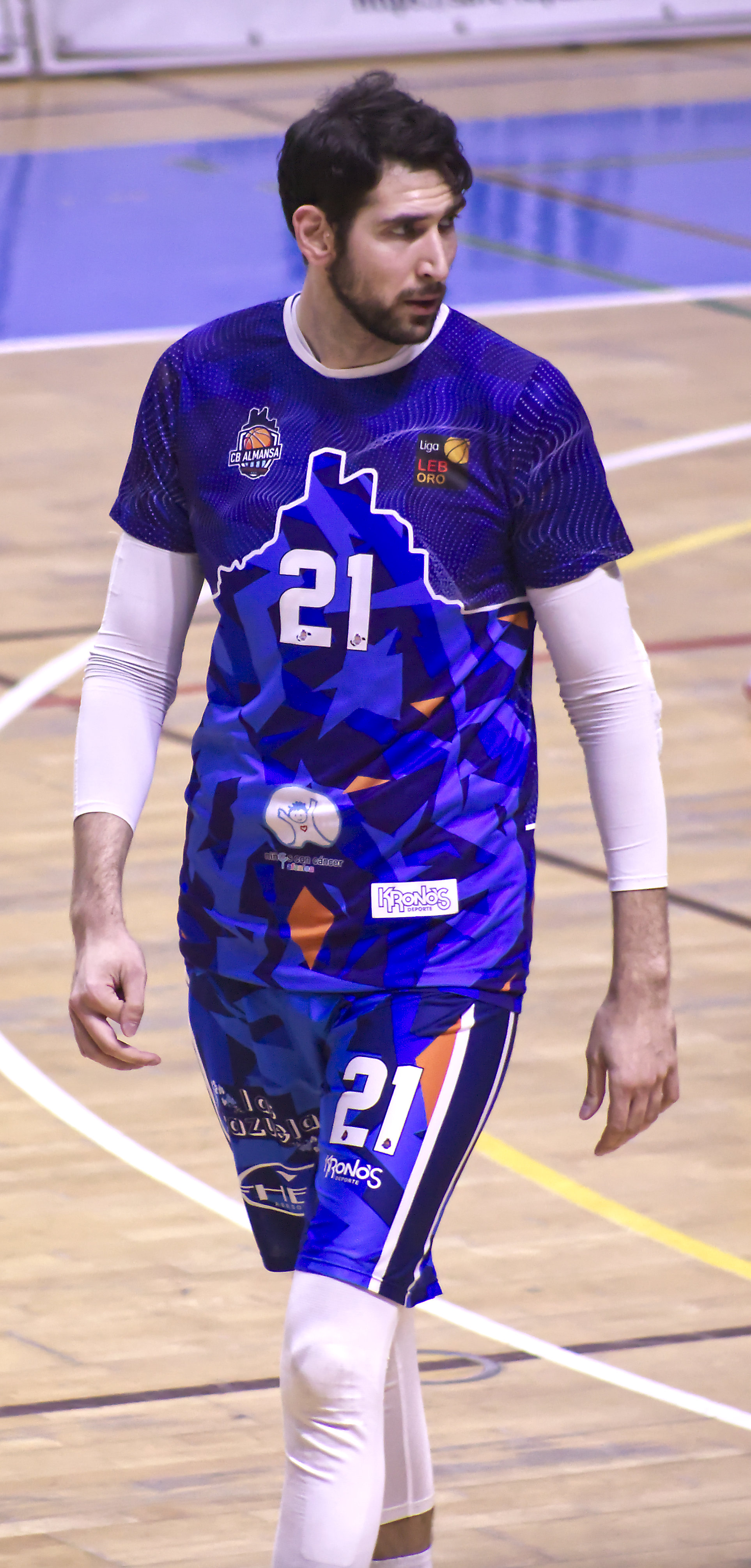
- Dimakopoulos with CB Almansa in 2022

No. 21 – East Perth Eagles
- Position: Center
- League: NBL1 West

Personal information
- Born: 7 November 1994 (age 32) Patras, Greece
- Listed height: 7 ft 2 in (2.18 m)
- Listed weight: 255 lb (116 kg)

Career information
- High school: Cathedral (Los Angeles, California)
- College: UC Irvine (2013–2017)
- NBA draft: 2017: undrafted
- Playing career: 2017–present

Career history
- 2017: Panionios
- 2017–2018: Baskonia B
- 2018–2019: Apollon Patras
- 2019–2020: AEL Limassol
- 2020–2021: Aris Leeuwarden
- 2021–2022: Almansa
- 2022: Eastern Mavericks
- 2022: MBK Handlová
- 2022: UBSC Graz
- 2023: Albacete Basket
- 2023: Joondalup Wolves
- 2024: Perth Redbacks
- 2024: AM Ikaroi Trikalon
- 2025–present: East Perth Eagles

Career highlights
- Second-team All-Big West (2017)

Ioannis Dimakopoulos (Greek: Ιωάννης Δημακόπουλος; born 7 November 1994) is a Greek-Australian professional basketball player for the East Perth Eagles of the NBL1 West. Listed as 7 ft 2 in (2.18 m), he plays the center position.

== Early life ==
Dimakopoulos was born in Patras, Greece. He played for the junior teams of Panathinaikos between 2008 and 2012. He participated in the 2010 Jordan Brand Classic in Istanbul, Turkey.

In 2012, Dimakopoulos moved to the United States to attend Cathedral High School in Los Angeles, California. He was a 2013 McDonald's All-American nominee.

== College career ==
After high school, Dimakopoulos played four years of NCAA Division I college basketball for the UC Irvine Anteaters. As a senior in 2016–17, he was named to the All-Big West Conference Second Team.

== Professional career ==
On 7 September 2017, Dimakopoulos signed with the Greek club Kolossos Rodou. Two weeks later, he was released from the club for "personal reasons". The following month, he had a two-game stint with Panionios. In December 2017, he joined Spanish club Baskonia B.

For the 2018–19 season, Dimakopoulos played for Apollon Patras. He then played for AEL Limassol in Cyprus in 2019–20.

On 23 December 2020, Dimakopoulos signed with Aris Leeuwarden of the Dutch Basketball League for the season restart in January 2021.

For the 2021–22 season, Dimakopoulos played for Spanish club Almansa.

In June 2022, Dimakopoulos joined the Eastern Mavericks of the NBL1 Central in Australia. He averaged 19.2 points per game.

For the 2022–23 season, Dimakopoulos had a one-game stint with MBK Handlová in Slovakia before playing 14 games for UBSC Graz in Austria between 2 October and 29 December. He joined Spanish club Albacete Basket in January 2023.

On 8 March 2023, Dimakopoulos signed with the Joondalup Wolves in Australia for the 2023 NBL1 West season. He helped the Wolves reach the grand final, where they lost 86–80 to the Geraldton Buccaneers despite Dimakopoulos' 10 points, nine rebounds and five assists. In 14 games, he averaged 11.43 points, 7.36 rebounds, 4.14 assists and 1.21 blocks per game.

On 6 December 2023, Dimakopoulos signed with the Perth Redbacks for the 2024 NBL1 West season.

In October 2024, Dimakopoulos had a four-game stint with AM Ikaroi Trikalon of the Greek A2 Basket League.

Dimakopoulos joined the East Perth Eagles for the 2025 NBL1 West season. He re-joined the Eagles for the 2026 NBL1 West season.

== National team career ==
Dimakopoulos was a member of the Greek junior national teams. He played at the 2010 FIBA Europe Under-16 Championship and the 2011 FIBA Europe Under-18 Championship.

== Personal life ==
Dimakopoulos is the son of Dimitris and Aikaterina Dimakopoulos. His father played professional basketball and represented the Greek national team. His mother was born in Australia.

Dimakopoulos holds an Australian passport and has dual Greek-Australian citizenship.
