= Marija Tonković =

Personal information
- Born: 23 November 1959 (age 66) Rijeka, PR Croatia, FPR Yugoslavia
- Listed height: 1.80 m (5 ft 11 in)
- Listed weight: 66 kg (146 lb)
- Position: Center

Career history
- Voždovac
Medals
Women's basketball
Representing Yugoslavia
Bronze medal – third place	1980 Moskva	Team competition
EuroBasket
Bronze medal – third place	1980 Banja Luka	Team competition

Marija Tonković, married Pavićević, (born 23 November 1959) is a former basketball player who competed for Yugoslavia in the 1980 Summer Olympics.
