= ŽKK Radnički Beograd =

Women's basketball club in Belgrade, Serbia

Radnički Beograd
- Nickname: Krstaši (The Crusaders)
- Leagues: Second League of Serbia
- Founded: 1945; 80 years ago
- History: ŽKK Radnički Beograd; 1945–present
- Arena: SC Šumice
- Capacity: 2,000
- Location: Belgrade, Serbia
- Team colors: Red, Blue and White
- President: Tijana Zupančić
- Head coach: Milica Milutinović
- Championships: 6 National Championships; 2 National Cups
- Website: zkk-radnickibeograd.org.rs
Home	Away

Ženski košarkaški klub Radnički (Serbian Cyrillic: Женски кошаркашки клуб Раднички), commonly referred to as Radnički Belgrade, is a women's basketball club based in Belgrade, Serbia. The club currently participates in the Second Basketball League of Serbia.

== Honours ==
National Championships – 6

- Yugoslav Women's Basketball League:
  - Winners (6) : 1961, 1962, 1964, 1965, 1966, 1968
  - Runners-up (6) : 1946, 1956, 1958, 1959, 1960, 1967

National Cups – 2

- Yugoslav Women's Basketball Cup:
  - Winners (2) : 1960, 1962

== Notable former coaches ==
- Ranko Žeravica
- Borivoje Cenić
- Branko Kovačević
- Milan Vasojević

== See also ==
- List of basketball clubs in Serbia by major honours won
