= Soviet Union women's national under-18 and under-19 basketball team =

Basketball team

- FIBA zone: FIBA Europe
- National federation: Soviet Basketball Federation

FIBA U19 World Championship
- Appearances: 2
- Medals: Gold: (1985, 1989)

FIBA U18 European Championship
- Appearances: 15 (incl. 1 as CIS)
- Medals: Gold: (1965, 1967, 1969, 1971, 1973, 1977, 1979, 1981, 1986, 1988, 1990) (1992 as CIS); Silver: (1983, 1984); Bronze: (1975)
Home	Away
Medal record
Event	1st	2nd	3rd
FIBA U19 World Championship	2	0	0
FIBA Europe U18 Championship	12	2	1
Total	14	2	1

The Soviet Union women's national under-18 and under-19 basketball team was the women's basketball side that represented the Soviet Union in international under-18 and under-19 competitions, until the dissolution of the Soviet Union in 1991. In 1992, CIS women's national under-18 basketball team represented the Commonwealth of Independent States in international under-18 competitions. After 1992, the successor countries all set up their own national teams.

== FIBA Under-19 World Championship for Women ==
Year	Pos.	Pld	W	L
(United States) 1985	1st place, gold medalist(s)	6	5	1
(Spain) 1989	1st place, gold medalist(s)	7	7	0
Total	2/2	13	12	1

== FIBA Europe Under-18 Championship for Women ==
Year	Pos.	Pld	W	L
(Bulgaria) 1965	1st place, gold medalist(s)	7	7	0
(Italy) 1967	1st place, gold medalist(s)	9	9	0
(Germany) 1969	1st place, gold medalist(s)	8	8	0
(Socialist Federal Republic of Yugoslavia) 1971	1st place, gold medalist(s)	7	7	0
(Italy) 1973	1st place, gold medalist(s)	7	7	0
(Spain) 1975	3rd place, bronze medalist(s)	7	6	1
(Bulgaria) 1977	1st place, gold medalist(s)	7	7	0
(Italy) 1979	1st place, gold medalist(s)	7	7	0
(Hungary) 1981	1st place, gold medalist(s)	7	7	0
(Italy) 1983	2nd place, silver medalist(s)	7	6	1
(Spain) 1984	2nd place, silver medalist(s)	7	5	2
(Italy) 1986	1st place, gold medalist(s)	7	7	0
(Bulgaria) 1988	1st place, gold medalist(s)	7	7	0
(Spain) 1990	1st place, gold medalist(s)	7	6	1
Representing CIS
(Greece) 1992	1st place, gold medalist(s)	7	6	1
Total	15/15	108	102	6

== See also ==
- Soviet Union women's national basketball team
- Soviet Union women's national under-16 basketball team
- Soviet Union men's national under-19 basketball team
- Russia women's national basketball team
- Russia women's national under-19 basketball team
