= Ilvana Zvizdić =

Yugoslav and Bosnian basketball player

Personal information
- Born: 14 January 1971 (age 55) Sarajevo, SFR Yugoslavia
- Listed height: 1.87 m (6 ft 2 in)

Career information
- Playing career: 1986–2005
- Position: Power forward / small forward

Career history
- 1986–1990: Jedinstvo AIDA
- 1990–1992: Željezničar Sarajevo
- 1992–1993: Partizan
- 1996–1997: Deniz Nakliyat Sport Club
- 1997–1998: Brisaspor Izmit
- 1999–2001: Faenza Pallacanestro
- 2004–2005: Polisportiva Ares Ribera

Ilvana Zvizdić (born 14 January 1971 in Sarajevo) is a former Yugoslav and Bosnian female basketball player.
