= ŽKK Jedinstvo Tuzla =

Basketball club in Bosnia and Herzegovina

ŽKK Jedinstvo
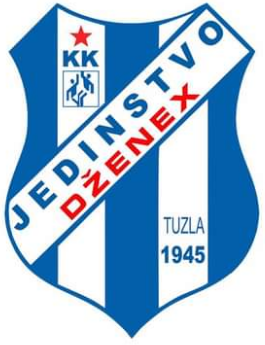
- Nickname: ŽKK Jedinstvo Tuzla, Jedinstvo Trocal, Jedinstvo BH Telecom
- Leagues: Bosnian League
- Founded: 5 February 1945; 80 years ago
- Arena: SPKC Mejdan
- Location: Tuzla, Bosnia and Herzegovina
- Team colors: Blue and White
- Main sponsor: [[]]
- President: (Bosnia and Herzegovina) Mara Lakić Brčaninović
- Head coach: (Bosnia and Herzegovina) Mirza Oštraković
- Championships: Championship of Yugoslavia Champions 1st place 1987, 1988, 1990; Yugoslav Cup Champions 1st place 1988, 1991; Championship of BiH Champions 1st place 1994, 1996, 1997; Runner-Up 2nd place 2006, 2013: Cup of KS RBiH Champions 1st place 2002; Cup of KS BiH Champions 1st place 2010 Runner-Up 2nd place 2011, 2015: FIBA Women's European Champions Cup Semi-finalist 3rd place 1988; FIBA Women's European Champions Cup Champions 1st place 1989: Ronchetti Cup Runner-Up 2nd place 1990

Ženski košarkaški klub Jedinstvo Piemonte is a women's basketball club from Tuzla, Bosnia and Herzegovina. The club won three Yugoslav Women's Basketball League championships during the 1980s, as Jedinstvo Aida.

In 1989 Jedinstvo Tuzla won the EuroLeague Women, and they played in the 1990 Ronchetti Cup final.

The club's best and most famous player of all time was FIBA Hall of Fame inductee Razija Mujanović. Among the other players were Mara Lakić, Zorica Dragičević, Naida Hot, Smilja Rađenović, Ilvana Zvizdić, Jadranka Savić, Vesna Pođanin, Dragana Jeftić and Stojanka Došić, many of which also represented Yugoslavia with the national team. The most famous ex-coach is Mihajlo Vuković, who led the team during the successful years.

== History ==
The club was founded in 1945, immediately after the liberation of Yugoslavia in World War II, the same as its male counterpart KK Sloboda Dita.

The club has been an amateur since its inception in the early 1970s. The club played in the second Yugoslav Basketball League, with mediocre results until the 1979/1980 season, when they were promoted to the first Yugoslavian Basketball League. However, they were relegated the following year. The club got back into the first league in the 1982/1983 season, where they finished in eighth position and were secure from relegation.

The club kept growing and getting better results until it won the title in the 1986/1987 season.

In the 1987/1988 season Jedinstvo played in Europe for the first time. They beat Arama Ankara in the qualification round. They then beat Universitatea Cluj in the first round, and got into Group, where they finished third. In home competition they weren't dominant as the previous year, but they managed to secure the title in the playoffs after the third game.

In the season that followed, 1987/1988, Jedinstvo was once again representative of Yugoslavia in Euroleague and they won competition over Vicenza, but they failed to clinch the domestic title after finishing the regular part of season as first.

In season 1989/1990, Jedinstvo won its last Yugoslavia title, and finished in second place in Ronchetti Cup.

In the 1990/1991 season team played in Euroleague, and they finished fifth in Yugoslav League short of two games. This was the last Yugoslavian basketball season.

=== Names ===
ŽKK Jedinstvo Tuzla, Jedinstvo Trocal, Jedinstvo BH Telecom

== Arena ==
Jedinstvo plays its games in SPKC Mejdan in Tuzla, usually in a small arena, that has a capacity of 600.

== Current roster ==
Roster for the 2018/2019 season:

Name	Nat.	Position	Height	Born	Born in	In club since
Jasmina Ahmetbegović	(Bosnia and Herzegovina)	-	185 cm	1994-08-01	-	2017-10-18
Džejla Ahmetović	(Bosnia and Herzegovina)	-	167 cm	2001-12-25	-	2017-10-18
Arabela Al Salamat	(Bosnia and Herzegovina)	-	-	-	-	2017-10-20
Maja Alempijević	(Bosnia and Herzegovina)	Guard	173 cm	2001-05-17	Tuzla	-
Adna Avdić	(Bosnia and Herzegovina)	-	-	-	-	-
Ema Beganović	(Bosnia and Herzegovina)	-	155 cm	2004-01-09	-	2017-10-20
Monika Brcina	(Bosnia and Herzegovina)	-	175 cm	2002-11-01	-	2017-10-20
Dženita Dedić	(Bosnia and Herzegovina)	-	173 cm	2001-11-09	-	2017-10-18
Elma Feukić	(Bosnia and Herzegovina)	-	158 cm	2002-07-08	-	2017-10-18
Delila Grebović	(Bosnia and Herzegovina)	-	176 cm	2004-09-18	Tuzla	2017-10-18
Melika Hadžiefendić	(Bosnia and Herzegovina)	-	168 cm	2001-12-25	-	2017-10-18
Lana Jurčenko	(Bosnia and Herzegovina)	-	157 cm	2003-05-27	-	2017-10-18
Alma Jusupović	(Bosnia and Herzegovina)	-	173 cm	1996-10-09	-	2017-10-18
Amra Latifagić	(Bosnia and Herzegovina)	-	175 cm	2002-06-06	-	2017-10-18
Amina Mecić	(Bosnia and Herzegovina)	-	191 cm	2001-10-08	Tuzla	2017-10-20
Žaklina Milošević	(Bosnia and Herzegovina)	-	177 cm	1999-04-28	-	2017-10-18
Naida Nurkić	(Bosnia and Herzegovina)	-	182 cm	2001-11-04	-	2017-10-18
Adna Razić	(Bosnia and Herzegovina)	-	185 cm	2001-10-08	-	2017-10-18
Naida Ruščuklić	(Bosnia and Herzegovina)	-	170 cm	2001-04-17	-	2017-10-18
Adela Šabić	(Bosnia and Herzegovina)	-	182 cm	2003-01-21	-	2017-10-18
Lejla Sadiković	(Bosnia and Herzegovina)	Guard	173 cm	2002-06-14	-	-

== Honours ==
=== Yugoslavia ===
- Championship of Yugoslavia Champions 1st place 1987, 1988, 1990
- Yugoslav Cup Champions 1st place 1988, 1991

=== Bosnia and Herzegovina ===
- Championship of BiH Champions 1st place 1994, 1996, 1997

Runner-Up 2nd place 2006, 2013

- Cup of KS RBiH Champions 1st place 2002
- Cup of BiH Champions 1st place 2010

Runner-Up 2nd place 2011, 2015

=== European cups ===
- FIBA Women's European Champions Cup Semi-finalist 3rd place 1988

FIBA Women's European Champions Cup Champions 1st place 1989

- Ronchetti Cup Runner-Up 2nd place 1990

== Notable former players ==
- Razija Mujanović
- Mara Lakić – Brčaninović
- Tanja Pavlić - Ilić
- Naida Hot - Sušić
- Stojanka Došić
- Milena Djukić - Lučić
- Zorica Dragičević
- Smilja Radjenović
- Ilvana Zvizdić
- Radmila Maksimović
- Jadranka Savić
- Dragana Jeftić
- Vesna Pođanin

== Notable former coaches ==
- Mihajlo Vuković

== See also ==
- KK Sloboda Tuzla
