= 1987–88 FIBA Women's European Champions Cup =

International basketball competition

The 1987-88 FIBA Women's European Champions Cup was the 30th edition of FIBA Europe's competition for national champions women's basketball clubs, running from 23 September 1987 to 23 March 1988. Defending champion Primigi Vicenza defeated Dynamo Novosibirsk in a rematch of the previous edition's final to win its fourth title in a row, an overall fifth.

== Qualifying round ==
Team #1	Agg.	Team #2	1st	2nd
CIF Lisboa (Portugal)	129–147	(United Kingdom) Avon Northampton	63–78	66–69
Sleza Wroclaw (Poland)	126–132	(Finland) Sampo Lahti	62–61	64–71
Arama Ankara (Turkey)	91–167	(Socialist Federal Republic of Yugoslavia) Jedinstvo Tuzla	41–77	50–90
Elitzur Holon (Israel)	165–168	(Romania) Universitatea Cluj	93–85	72–83
Spora Luxembourg	72–175	(Germany) Agon Düsseldorf	36–96	36–79
Hoofddorp (Netherlands)	139–152	(Sweden) Solna	72–74	67–78
Birsfelden (Switzerland)	113–173	(Spain) Raventós Tortosa	61–83	52–90
Sporting Athens (Greece)	89–161	(France) Stade Français	49–70	40–91
Charles Quint (Belgium)	148–184	(Hungary) Tungsram Budapest	71–83	77–101

== Round of 12 ==
Team #1	Agg.	Team #2	1st	2nd
Primigi Vicenza (Italy)	187–91	(United Kingdom) Avon Northampton	106–41	81–50
Sampo Lahti (Finland)	126–195	(Soviet Union) Dynamo Novosibirsk	58–79	68–116
Jedinstvo Tuzla (Socialist Federal Republic of Yugoslavia)	192–139	(Romania) Universitatea Cluj	104–68	88–71
Solna (Sweden)	155–170	(Germany) Agon Düsseldorf	70–78	85–92
Raventós Tortosa (Spain)	121–143	(Czech Republic) Sparta Prague	59–66	62–77
Stade Français (France)	155–154	(Hungary) Tungsram Budapest	74–67	81–87

== Group stage ==
Team	Pld	W	L	PF	PA
(Italy) Primigi Vicenza	10	9	1	848	728
(Soviet Union) Dynamo Novosibirsk	10	8	2	956	733
(Socialist Federal Republic of Yugoslavia) Jedinstvo Tuzla	10	6	4	804	872
(Germany) Agon Düsseldorf	10	3	7	771	793
(Czech Republic) Sparta Prague	10	3	7	759	812
(France) Stade Français	10	1	9	655	802

== Final ==
Team #1		Team #2
Primigi Vicenza (Italy)	70–64	(Soviet Union) Dynamo Novosibirsk
