= Mara Lakić =

Bosnian basketball player

Personal information
- Born: 18 August 1963 (age 63) Gradačac, SR Bosnia-Herzegovina, SFR Yugoslavia
- Listed height: 1.70 m (5 ft 7 in)
- Listed weight: 65 kg (143 lb)
- Position: Shooting guard

Career history

Playing
- Jedinstvo AIDA

Coaching
- Bosnia and Herzegovina U20
Medals
Women's basketball
Representing (Socialist Federal Republic of Yugoslavia) Yugoslavia
European Championship
Silver medal – second place	1991 Tel Aviv
Olympic Games
Silver medal – second place	1988 Seoul
FIBA World Cup
Silver medal – second place	1990 Malaysia
Representing Bosnia and Herzegovina
Mediterranean Games
Gold medal – first place	1993 France

Mara Lakić-Brčaninović (born 18 August 1963 in Gradačac, SFR Yugoslavia) is a Bosnian basketball coach and former basketball player.

== Career ==
She started her career in Jedinstvo Aida, Tuzla, and played most of her club career for Jedinstvo. With the club she played and won most prestigious European club competition, the EuroLeague Women, in 1989, and played in the 1990 Ronchetti Cup final. She has won a silver medal at the 1988 Summer Olympics with the Yugoslavia women's national basketball team.
