= ŽKK Kranjska Gora – Jesenice =

Slovenian women's basketball club

Kranjska Gora – Jesenice
- Founded: 1954; 72 years ago
- Arena: OŠ Prežihovega Voranca
- Location: Kranjska Gora; Jesenice
- Team colors: Red, white
- President: Aljaž Slatnar
- Championships: 3 Slovenian Leagues; 1 Slovenian Cup
- Website: Official website

Ženski košarkarski klub Kranjska Gora – Jesenice is a women's basketball club based in Kranjska Gora, Slovenia. They play their home games at the Prežihov Voranc Primary School sports hall in Jesenice. During its history, the club won three Slovenian Championships and one Slovenian Cup.

== Honours ==
- Slovenian League

Winners: 2007, 2010, 2011
Runners-up: 2008, 2009

- Slovenian Cup

Winners: 2011
Runners-up: 2007, 2008, 2010
