= Slovenian Women's Basketball Cup =

- Sport: Basketball
- Founded: 1991
- No. of teams: 10 (2026–27)
- Country: Slovenia
- Continent: FIBA Europe (Europe)
- Most recent champion: Cinkarna Celje (20th title) (2025–26)
- Most titles: Cinkarna Celje (20 titles)
- Website: Official website

The Slovenian Women's Basketball Cup is the national women's basketball cup of Slovenia. It was first contested in the 1991–92 season.

== Cup winners ==
Season	Winners	Result	Runners-up
1991–92	Ježica	78–70	Apis
1992–93	Ježica	98–64	Apis
1993–94	Diamond Ježica	101–63	Rogaška
1994–95	Ježica	95–60	Odeja Marmor
1995–96	Ježica	72–60	Celje
1996–97	Ježica	99–51	Mibex Ilirija
1997–98	Imos Ježica	83–67	Ingrad Celje
1998–99	Imos Ježica	83–63	Ingrad Celje
1999–2000	Imos Ježica	72–38	Ingrad Celje
2000–01	Lek Ježica	71–56	Merkur Celje
2001–02	Lek Ježica	62–56	Merkur Celje
2002–03	Merkur Celje	65–42	Lek Ježica
2003–04	Postaja C. Maribor	77–65	Merkur Celje
2004–05	Merkur Celje	70–54	Lek Ježica
2005–06	Merkur Celje	90–53	KED Panter Ilirija
2006–07	Merkur Celje	75–62	Hit Kranjska Gora
2007–08	Merkur Celje	70–59	Hit Kranjska Gora
2008–09	Merkur Celje	80–76	AJM
2009–10	Merkur Celje	60–56	Hit Kranjska Gora
2010–11	Hit Kranjska Gora	86–70	Celje
2011–12	Athlete Celje	89–67	Triglav
2012–13	Athlete Celje	79–59	Domžale
2013–14	Triglav	65–47	Domžale
2014–15	Athlete Celje	72–49	Triglav
2015–16	Athlete Celje	71–69	Triglav
2016–17	Athlete Celje	61–53	Triglav
2017–18	Triglav	72–68	Cinkarna Celje
2018–19	Cinkarna Celje	95–67	Akson Ilirija
2019–20	Cinkarna Celje	80–51	Jasmin sport Ledita
2020–21	Cinkarna Celje	83–49	Triglav
2021–22	Cinkarna Celje	81–71	Triglav
2022–23	Cinkarna Celje	72–67	Triglav
2023–24	Cinkarna Celje	89–32	Akson Ilirija
2024–25	Cinkarna Celje	79–68	Triglav
2025–26	Cinkarna Celje	69–52	Maribor

== Performance by club ==
Team	Winners	Runners-up	Years won	Years runner-up
Celje	20	9	2003, 2005, 2006, 2007, 2008, 2009, 2010, 2012, 2013, 2015, 2016, 2017, 2019, 2020, 2021, 2022, 2023, 2024, 2025, 2026	1996, 1998, 1999, 2000, 2001, 2002, 2004, 2011, 2018
Ježica	11	2	1992, 1993, 1994, 1995, 1996, 1997, 1998, 1999, 2000, 2001, 2002	2003, 2005
Triglav	2	8	2014, 2018	2012, 2015, 2016, 2017, 2021, 2022, 2023, 2025
Maribor	1	4	2004	1992, 1993, 2009, 2026
Kranjska Gora	1	3	2011	2007, 2008, 2010
Ilirija	—	4	—	1997, 2006, 2019, 2024
Domžale	—	2	—	2013, 2014
Rogaška	—	1	—	1994
Škofja Loka	—	1	—	1995
Ledita	—	1	—	2020

== See also ==
- Slovenian Women's Basketball League
