= Slovenian Women's Basketball League =

- Sport: Basketball
- Founded: 1991; 35 years ago
- No. of teams: 6
- Country: Slovenia
- Continent: Europe
- Most recent champion: Cinkarna Celje (22nd title) (2025–26)
- Most titles: Cinkarna Celje (22 titles)
- Domestic cup: Slovenian Women's Cup
- Website: kzs.si

The Slovenian Women's Basketball League (Slovene: 1. SKL za ženske) is the premier league for women's basketball clubs in Slovenia. Founded in 1991 following the independence of the country, it is contested by six teams.

ŽKK Celje is the league's most successful team with 22 titles.

== 2026–27 teams ==
- Cinkarna Celje
- Domel
- Ilirija
- Ježica
- Maribor
- Triglav

== Champions ==
Season	Winners	Runners-up	Result
1991–92	Ježica	Kozmetika Afrodita	/
1992–93	Ježica	Ivec Wetrok	2–0
1993–94	Ježica	Ivec Wetrok	2–0
1994–95	Ježica	Maribor	2–0
1995–96	Ježica	Celje	2–0
1996–97	Ježica	Ilirija	2–0
1997–98	Ježica	Ingrad Celje	2–0
1998–99	Ježica	Ilirija	2–0
1999–2000	Merkur Celje	Ježica	2–1
2000–01	Lek Ježica	Merkur Celje	2–1
2001–02	Lek Ježica	Merkur Celje	3–1
2002–03	Merkur Celje	Ježica	3–0
2003–04	Merkur Celje	Ježica	3–0
2004–05	Merkur Celje	Ježica	3–0
2005–06	Merkur Celje	Ježica	3–1
2006–07	Hit Kranjska Gora	Merkur Celje	3–1
2007–08	Merkur Celje	Hit Kranjska Gora	3–0
2008–09	Merkur Celje	Hit Kranjska Gora	3–1
2009–10	Hit Kranjska Gora	Merkur Celje	3–2
2010–11	Hit Kranjska Gora	Athlete Celje	3–2
2011–12	Athlete Celje	Triglav	3–0
2012–13	Athlete Celje	Triglav	3–0
2013–14	Athlete Celje	Triglav	3–0
2014–15	Athlete Celje	Triglav	3–0
2015–16	Athlete Celje	Triglav	3–0
2016–17	Athlete Celje	Triglav	3–0
2017–18	Cinkarna Celje	Triglav	3–0
2018–19	Cinkarna Celje	Triglav	3–0
2019–20	Cinkarna Celje	Ježica	—N/a (Note: The playoffs were not held due to the COVID-19 pandemic in Slovenia.)
2020–21	Cinkarna Celje	Triglav	3–0
2021–22	Cinkarna Celje	Triglav	3–0
2022–23	Cinkarna Celje	Triglav	3–0
2023–24	Cinkarna Celje	Triglav	3–0
2024–25	Cinkarna Celje	Triglav	3–0
2025–26	Cinkarna Celje	Ilirija	3–1

== List of champions ==
Team	Winners	Runners-up	Years won	Years runner-up
Celje	22	7	2000, 2003, 2004, 2005, 2006, 2008, 2009, 2012, 2013, 2014, 2015, 2016, 2017, 2018, 2019, 2020, 2021, 2022, 2023, 2024, 2025, 2026	1996, 1998, 2001, 2002, 2007, 2010, 2011
Ježica	10	6	1992, 1993, 1994, 1995, 1996, 1997, 1998, 1999, 2001, 2002	2000, 2003, 2004, 2005, 2006, 2020
Kranjska Gora	3	2	2007, 2010, 2011	2008, 2009
Triglav	—	13	—	2012, 2013, 2014, 2015, 2016, 2017, 2018, 2019, 2021, 2022, 2023, 2024, 2025
Maribor	—	3	—	1993, 1994, 1995
Ilirija	—	3	—	1997, 1999, 2026
Rogaška	—	1	—	1992
