= Czechoslovakia women's national under-18 and under-19 basketball team =

Czechoslovakia
World Championships
- Appearances: 1
- Medals: none

Europe Championship
- Appearances: 10
- Medals: Gold: 1975, 1983; Silver: 1967, 1971, 1986, 1988; Bronze: 1965, 1977, 1979, 1984

The Czechoslovakia women's national under-18 and under-19 basketball team was the women's basketball side that represented Czechoslovakia in international under-18 and under-19 competitions. After the country was peacefully dissolved in 1993, the team was succeeded by separate Czech and Slovak teams.

== See also ==
- Czechoslovakia national basketball team
- Czechoslovakia women's national basketball team
