= Bojana Milošević =

Serbian basketball player (1965–2020)

Personal information
- Born: 29 November 1965 Kraljevo, SFR Yugoslavia
- Died: 16 April 2020 (aged 54) Belgrade, Serbia
- Listed height: 1.88 m (6 ft 2 in)
- Listed weight: 77 kg (170 lb)
- Position: Center

Career history
- 1987–: Crvena zvezda
- 1992—1993: Libertas Trogylos
- Voždovac
Medals
Women's basketball
Representing Yugoslavia
Summer Olympics
Silver medal – second place	1988 Seoul	Team competition
World Cup
Silver medal – second place	1990 Kuala Lumpur	Team competition
EuroBasket
Silver medal – second place	1987 Cadiz	Team competition
Silver medal – second place	1991 Tel Aviv	Team competition
Universiade
Gold medal – first place	1987 Zagreb	Team competition
Bronze medal – third place	1985 Kobe	Team competition
U19 World Cup
Bronze medal – third place	1985 Colorado Springs	Team competition
U18 EuroBasket
Gold medal – first place	1984 Toledo	Team competition
U16 EuroBasket
Silver medal – second place	1982 Forssa & Uusikaupunki	Team competition

Bojana Milošević Brnad (Serbian Cyrillic: Бојана Милошевић Брнад, 29 November 1965 – 16 April 2020) was a Serbian basketball player. She competed for Yugoslavia in the 1988 Summer Olympics.

Milošević died in April 2020 in Belgrade, Serbia.
