= Yugoslav Women's Basketball League =

Natuional sports league

- Sport: Basketball
- Founded: 1945
- First season: 1945
- Folded: 1992
- Country: (Socialist Federal Republic of Yugoslavia) Yugoslavia (1945–1992)
- Continent: FIBA Europe (Europe)
- Most titles: Crvena zvezda (24 titles)
- Level on pyramid: 1
- Domestic cup: Yugoslav Women's Basketball Cup

Championship of Yugoslavia in Basketball for women took place beginning in 1945. Belgrade Crvena zvezda (Red Stars of Belgrade) was an undefeated champion until 1992.

Although all countries founded after the breakup of Yugoslavia each now have their own national domestic leagues, each of the six nations now take part in the Adriatic League, which was founded in 2001, and which is today the closest league in existence similar to the former Yugoslav Basketball League.

== History ==
After the formation of Socialist Federal Republic of Yugoslavia in 1945, there arose a need for athletic development in the fledgling nation. Post-WW2 Yugoslavia was (with the exception of major cities such as Belgrade, Ljubljana, Zagreb and Sarajevo) for the most part lacking in competitive opportunities in sports. In response to this, 1945 and 1946 saw an explosion of new clubs and leagues for every sport, the basketball league being part of this phenomenon.

The very first competition under the newly formed Yugoslav Basketball League in 1945, drawing parallel to the Yugoslav First League (of football), was more or less a nationwide affirmation of unity. Instead of individual clubs competing in the usual fashion, there were only eight teams. Six representing each state within Yugoslavia, one representing the province of Vojvodina, and the last representing the Yugoslav People's Army.

== Champions ==
Season	Champion	Runner-up
Championships of Republic
1945	Serbia	Croatia
Championship for Clubs
1946	Crvena zvezda	Radnički Belgrade
1947	Crvena zvezda	Zadar
1948	Crvena zvezda	Proleter Zrenjanin
1949	Crvena zvezda	Proleter Zrenjanin
1950	Crvena zvezda	Split
1951	Crvena zvezda	Proleter Zrenjanin
1952	Crvena zvezda	Lokomotiva
1953	Crvena zvezda	Split
1954	Crvena zvezda	Split
1955	Crvena zvezda	Split
1956	Crvena zvezda	Radnički Belgrade
1957	Crvena zvezda	Split
1958	Crvena zvezda	Radnički Belgrade
1959	Crvena zvezda	Radnički Belgrade
1960	Crvena zvezda	Radnički Beograd
1961	Radnički Beograd	Crvena zvezda
1962	Radnički Beograd	Crvena zvezda
1963	Crvena zvezda	Trešnjevka
1964	Radnički Belgrade	Crvena zvezda
1965	Radnički Belgrade	Crvena zvezda
1966	Radnički Belgrade	Trešnjevka
1967	Trešnjevka	Radnički Belgrade
1968	Radnički Belgrade	Crvena zvezda
1969	Vojvodina	Crvena zvezda
1969–70	Vojvodina	Crvena zvezda
1970–71	Željezničar Sarajevo	Crvena zvezda
1971–72	Voždovac	Vojvodina
1972–73	Crvena zvezda	Bosna
1973–74	Bosna	Voždovac
1974–75	Voždovac	Crvena zvezda
1975–76	Crvena zvezda	Industromontaža
1976–77	Crvena zvezda	Bosna
1977–78	Crvena zvezda	Bosna
1978–79	Crvena zvezda	Monting
1979–80	Crvena zvezda	Monting
1980–81	Crvena zvezda	Monting
1981–82	Monting	Voždovac
1982–83	Monting	Voždovac
1983–84	Partizan	Monting
1984–85	Partizan	Monting
1985–86	Partizan	Iskra Delta Ježica
1986–87	Jedinstvo Aida Tuzla	Crvena zvezda
1987–88	Jedinstvo Aida Tuzla	Elemes Šibenik
1988–89	Crvena zvezda	Elemes Šibenik
1989–90	Jedinstvo Aida Tuzla	Elemes Šibenik
1990–91	Elemes Šibenik	Crvena zvezda
1991–92	Crvena zvezda	Vojvodina

== Championship winning teams ==
Team	Winners	Runners-up	Years Won	Years Runner-up
Crvena zvezda	25	11	1946, 1947, 1948, 1949, 1950, 1951, 1952, 1953, 1954, 1955, 1956, 1957, 1958, 1959, 1960, 1963, 1973, 1976, 1977, 1978, 1979, 1980, 1981, 1989, 1992	1961, 1962, 1964, 1965, 1968, 1969, 1970, 1971, 1975, 1987, 1991
Radnički Beograd	6	6	1961, 1962, 1964, 1965, 1966, 1968	1946, 1956, 1958, 1959, 1960, 1967
Trešnjevka 2009 (Note: Playing under the name of "Trešnjevka", "Industromontaža" and "Monting" due to sponsorship reasons.)	3	8	1967, 1982, 1983	1963, 1966, 1976, 1979, 1980, 1981, 1984, 1985
Partizan	3	–	1984, 1985, 1986	–
Jedinstvo Tuzla	3	–	1987, 1988, 1990	–
Voždovac	2	3	1972, 1975	1974, 1982, 1983
Vojvodina	2	2	1969, 1970	1972, 1991
Bosna	1	3	1974	1973, 1977, 1978
Šibenik	1	3	1991	1988, 1989, 1990
Željezničar Sarajevo	1	–	1971	–
Split	–	5	–	1950, 1953, 1954, 1955, 1957
Proleter Zrenjanin	–	3	–	1948, 1949, 1951
Zadar	–	1	–	1947
Lokomotiva	–	1	–	1952
Ježica	–	1	–	1986

== Yugoslav basketball clubs in European-wide competitions (1958-1992) ==
=== European Champions Cup ===
Team	Finish			
Team	Champion	Finalist	3rd Place	4th Place
Crvena zvezda	1979	1981	1978, 1990	1959, 1960, 1964, 1980
Jedinstvo Tuzla	1989	—	1988	—
Monting Zagreb	—	—	1983	—
Radnički Belgrade	—	—	—	1962

=== Ronchetti Cup ===
Team	Finish	
Team	Champion	Finalist
Monting Zagreb	1980	1976, 1981
Voždovac	—	1972
Jedinstvo Tuzla	—	1990
