= Yugoslav Women's Basketball Cup =

- Sport: Basketball
- Founded: 1960
- First season: 1960
- Folded: 1992
- Country: (Socialist Federal Republic of Yugoslavia) Yugoslavia (1960–1992)
- Continent: (European Union) FIBA Europe (Europe)
- Most titles: Crvena zvezda (6 titles)

Cup of SFR Yugoslavia in Basketball for women took place from in 1960 until 1992. The most successful team in the tournament's history was Belgrade's Crvena zvezda.

== Winners ==
Season	Host city	Champion	Runner-up	Result
1960	Ljubljana	Radnički Belgrade	AŠK Olimpija	68:60
1961	Not held			
1962	Zagreb	Radnički Belgrade	Jugomontaža	44:40
1963	Not held			
1964	Not held			
1965	Not held			
1966	Not held			
1967	Not held			
1968	Not held			
1969	Not held			
1970	Not held			
1971	Not held			
1971–72	Novi Sad	Voždovac	Vojvodina	74:60
1972–73	Belgrade	Crvena zvezda	Željezničar Sarajevo	85:83
1973–74	Belgrade	Crvena zvezda	Voždovac	99:92
1974–75	Zagreb	Industromontaža	Crvena zvezda	73:68
1975–76	Belgrade	Crvena zvezda	Industromontaža	99:77
1976–77	Sarajevo	Bosna	Crvena zvezda	81:70
1977–78	Zagreb	Monting	Partizan	81:71
1978–79	Banja Luka	Crvena zvezda	Monting	77:75
1979–80	Zagreb	Monting	Crvena zvezda	84:76
1980–81	Paraćin	Crvena zvezda	Monting	85:75
1981–82	Ljubljana	Monting	Ježica	79:67
1982–83	Belgrade	Bosna	Partizan	87:72
1983–84	Zagreb	Voždovac	Monting	82:71
1984–85	Bosanski Brod	Partizan	Iskra Delta Ježica	72:68
1985–86	Zvornik	Partizan	Monting	75:72
1986–87	Sisak	Elemes Šibenik	Iskra Delta Ježica	70:69
1987–88	Novi Bečej	Jedinstvo Aida Tuzla	Iskra Delta Ježica	65:62
1988–89	Rogaška Slatina	Iskra Delta Ježica	Crvena zvezda	74:71
1989–90	Zadar	Elemes Šibenik	Crvena zvezda	81:65
1990–91	Bečej	Jedinstvo Aida Tuzla	Crvena zvezda	84:77
1991–92		Crvena zvezda	Željezničar Sarajevo	85:82

== Championship winning teams ==
Team	Winners	Runners-up	Years Won	Years Runner-up
Crvena zvezda	6	6	1973, 1974, 1976, 1979, 1981, 1992	1975, 1977, 1980, 1989, 1990, 1991
Trešnjevka 2009	4	6	1975, 1978, 1980, 1982	1962, 1976, 1979, 1981, 1984, 1986
Partizan	2	2	1985, 1986	1978, 1983
Voždovac	2	1	1972, 1984	1974
Radnički Belgrade	2	–	1960, 1962	–
Bosna	2	–	1977, 1983	–
Šibenik	2	–	1987, 1990	–
Jedinstvo Tuzla	2	–	1988, 1991	–
Ježica	1	4	1989	1982, 1985, 1987, 1988
Željezničar Sarajevo	–	2	–	1973, 1992
Olimpija	–	1	–	1960
Vojvodina	–	1	–	1972

== See also ==
- Basketball Federation of Yugoslavia
- Yugoslavia women's national basketball team
- Yugoslav Women's Basketball League
