= ŽKD Ježica =

Slovenian women's basketball club

Ježica
- Nickname: Modro-bele (The Blue and Whites)
- Leagues: Slovenian League; WABA 2 League
- Founded: 1962; 64 years ago
- Arena: Ježica Hall (Capacity: 800)
- Location: Ljubljana, Slovenia
- Team colors: Blue, white
- President: Sašo Todorović
- Head coach: Slavko Duščak
- Championships: 10 Slovenian Leagues; 11 Slovenian Cups; 1 Yugoslav Cup
- Website: zkdjezica.si
| Home | Away |

Žensko košarkarsko društvo Ježica, commonly referred to as ŽKD Ježica or simply Ježica, is a women's basketball club based in Ljubljana, Slovenia that competes in the Slovenian Women's Basketball League. Through the 1990s, the club won eight league titles in a row, becoming a regular in the EuroLeague Women. However, the team declined after 2002, not winning any major honours since then.

== Honours ==
- Slovenian League
  - Winners (10): 1992, 1993, 1994, 1995, 1996, 1997, 1998, 1999, 2001, 2002
  - Runners-up (6): 2000, 2003, 2004, 2005, 2006, 2020
- Slovenian Cup
  - Winners (11): 1992, 1993, 1994, 1995, 1996, 1997, 1998, 1999, 2000, 2001, 2002
  - Runners-up (2): 2003, 2005
- Yugoslav Cup
  - Winners (1): 1989
  - Runners-up (4): 1982, 1985, 1987, 1988
