= EuroBasket Women 2017 qualification =

This page describes the qualification procedure for EuroBasket Women 2017.

== Qualifying draw ==
The draw for the qualification took place on 4 July 2014 in Munich, Germany.

Pot 1	Pot 2	Pot 3	Pot 4
**Serbia**; **France**; **Spain**; **Belarus**; **Turkey**; **Russia**; **Montenegro**; Lithuania; **Slovakia**	**Greece**; Croatia; **Latvia**; Sweden; **Italy**; **Ukraine**; **Hungary**; Poland; Romania	Great Britain; **Belgium**; **Slovenia**; Portugal; Bulgaria; Israel; Germany; Estonia; Finland	Netherlands; Luxembourg; Switzerland; Bosnia and Herzegovina; Albania; Iceland

- Teams marked in **bold** have qualified for EuroBasket Women 2017.

== Groups ==
The nine group winners and six best second-placed teams qualified for the 2017 edition. To determine the best second-placed teams, the results against the fourth-placed team in the specific group were disregarded.

=== Group A ===
Pos	Team	Pld	W	L	PF	PA	PD	Pts	Qualification
1	Slovenia	4	3	1	283	246	+37	**7 (Note: Slovenia 135–128 Latvia)**	Final tournament
2	Latvia	4	3	1	280	278	+2	**7**	Final tournament
3	Lithuania	4	0	4	261	300	−39	**4**	

Source: FIBA
Rules for classification: 1) points; 2) Head-to-head; 3) Points difference; 4) Points scored.
Notes:

21 November 2015
17:05

Boxscore

**Latvia**	**65**–62	Lithuania
Scoring by quarter: 15–**17**, **18**–15, **16**–11, 16–**19**
Pts: Jēkabsone 15; Rebs: Teilāne 6 Asts: Jēkabsone 4		Pts: Nacickaitė 14; Rebs: Kuktienė 9 Asts: Okockytė 8

Olympic Centre, Riga
Attendance: 900
Referees: Jasmina Juras (SRB), Anne Panther (GER), Sonia Teixeira (POR)

25 November 2015
19:00

Boxscore

Lithuania	64–**73**	**Slovenia**
Scoring by quarter: 9–**11**, **23**–16, 14–**19**, 18–**27**
Pts: Šulčiūtė 16; Rebs: Petronytė 9 Asts: Okockytė, Petronytė 3		Pts: Erkić 19; Rebs: Piršić 8 Asts: Barič 5

Kėdainiai Arena, Kėdainiai
Attendance: 2,000
Referees: Anne Panther (GER), Karolina Andersson (FIN), Janusz Calik (POL)

20 February 2016
18:30

Boxscore

**Slovenia**	**69**–51	Latvia
Scoring by quarter: **21**–15, **9**–7, **20**–14, **19**–15
Pts: Piršić 13; Rebs: Piršić 10; Asts: Oblak 5		Pts: Šteinberga, Vitola 12; Rebs: Tamane 12; Asts: Jēkabsone-Žogota 6

Gimnazija Celje-Center, Celje
Attendance: 1,000
Referees: Dragan Nešković (SRB), Christoph Rohacky (AUT), Václav Lukeš (CZE)

24 February 2016
19:00

Boxscore

Lithuania	81–**87**	**Latvia**
Scoring by quarter: 14–**17**, **29**–18, 16–**23**, 22–**29**
Pts: Petronytė 31; Rebs: Petronytė 10; Asts: Linkevičienė 6		Pts: Jēkabsone-Žogota, Šteinberga 21; Rebs: Jēkabsone-Žogota 8 Asts: Jēkabsone-Žogota 6

Kėdainiai Arena, Kėdainiai
Attendance: 1,450
Referees: Marek Maliszewski (POL), Elena Chernova (RUS), Rain Peerandi (EST)

19 November 2016
18:00

Boxscore

**Slovenia**	**75**–54	Lithuania
Scoring by quarter: **20**–11, **21**–15, **19**–16, **15**–12
Pts: Erkić, Oblak 16; Rebs: Piršić 10; Asts: Barič 7		Pts: Okockytė 16; Rebs: Svaryte 11; Asts: Okockytė, Paugaitė 4

Gimnazija Celje-Center, Celje
Attendance: 1,000
Referees: Bojan Jovanović (BIH), Tamás Benczur (HUN), Marko Vladic (AUT)

23 November 2016
19:45

Boxscore

**Latvia**	**77**–66	Slovenia
Scoring by quarter: 19–**21**, **18**–9, **21**–15, 19–**21**
Pts: Baško 13; Rebs: Šteinberga, Vitola 10; Asts: Babkina 7		Pts: Piršić 20; Rebs: Lisec 12; Asts: Barič, Oblak 6

Olympic Centre, Riga
Attendance: 1,050
Referees: Vilius Mačiulaitis (LTU), Elena Chernova (RUS), Andrei Sharapa (BLR)

=== Group B ===
Pos	Team	Pld	W	L	PF	PA	PD	Pts	Qualification
1	France	6	6	0	463	321	+142	**12**	Final tournament
2	Croatia	6	3	3	426	396	+30	**9 (Note: Croatia 138–133 Netherlands)**	
3	Netherlands	6	3	3	367	402	−35	**9**	
4	Estonia	6	0	6	297	434	−137	**6**	

Source: FIBA
Rules for classification: 1) points; 2) Head-to-head; 3) Points difference; 4) Points scored.
Notes:

21 November 2015
19:45

Boxscore

**France**	**69**–41	Estonia
Scoring by quarter: **23**–7, **20**–9, **15**–10, 11–**15**
Pts: Miyem 22; Rebs: Ciak 6 Asts: three players 4		Pts: Pokk 12; Rebs: Bratka, Pokk 6 Asts: three players 2

Le Prado, Bourges
Attendance: 3,800
Referees: Ognjen Jokić (MNE), Antonio Zamora (AND), Michele Rossi (ITA)

21 November 2015
20:00

Boxscore

**Netherlands**	**76**–67	Croatia
Scoring by quarter: 11–**16**, 11–**17**, **24**–16, **30**–18
Pts: Butter 23; Rebs: Treffers 5 Asts: Halman 5		Pts: Ciglar 19; Rebs: Ivezić, Režan 7 Asts: Ciglar 7

Sporthallen Zuid, Amsterdam
Attendance: 1,000
Referees: Zafer Yılmaz (TUR), Christoph Rohacky (AUT), Sergii Tyslenko (UKR)

25 November 2015
19:00

Boxscore

Estonia	55–**67**	**Croatia**
Scoring by quarter: **19**–15, **16**–12, 7–**29**, **13**–11
Pts: Nikolai 13; Rebs: Nikolai 4 Asts: Püü 4		Pts: Zellous 21; Rebs: Premasunac 9 Asts: three players 2

Audentes Sports Center, Tallinn
Attendance: 1,100
Referees: Andrei Sharapa (BLR), Marko Vladic (AUT), Sigmundur Herbertsson (ISL)

25 November 2015
20:00

Boxscore

Netherlands	52–**76**	**France**
Scoring by quarter: 15–15, 12–**20**, 15–**18**, 10–**23**
Pts: Treffers 14; Rebs: Treffers 7 Asts: three players 2		Pts: Miyem 16; Rebs: Ayayi 11; Asts: three players 3

Sporthallen Zuid, Amsterdam
Attendance: 1,000
Referees: Jasmina Juras (SRB), Nikolaos Somos (GRE), Paul Unsworth (ENG)

20 February 2016
17:00

Boxscore

Estonia	63–**66**	**Netherlands**
Scoring by quarter: 14–**22**, **20**–13, 12–**14**, **17**–16
Pts: Nikolai 17; Rebs: Nikolai 9 Asts: Anderson 4		Pts: Treffers 13; Rebs: Treffers 17; Asts: Bröring, Van den Adel 3

Audentes Sports Center, Tallinn
Attendance: 500
Referees: Karolina Andersson (FIN), Jelena Smiljanić (SRB), Mārtiņš Kozlovskis (LAT)

20 February 2016
17:10

Boxscore

Croatia	70–**79**	**France**
Scoring by quarter: 12–**28**, 17–**20**, **21**–17, **20**–14
Pts: Ciglar 25; Rebs: Režan 11; Asts: Ciglar 6		Pts: Ayayi 15; Rebs: Skrela 8 Asts: Dumerc 7

Sportska dvorana Vijuš, Slavonski Brod
Attendance: 2,300
Referees: Milan Brziak (SVK), Gellért Kapitány (HUN), Andrada Csender (ROU)

24 February 2016
17:00

Boxscore

Estonia	47–**76**	**France**
Scoring by quarter: 5–**21**, 12–**18**, 15–**26**, **15**–11
Pts: Nikolai 16; Rebs: Nikolai 9 Asts: Nikolai 3		Pts: Miyem 17; Rebs: Filip, Miyem 7 Asts: Dumerc, Miyem 5

Audentes Sports Center, Tallinn
Attendance: 1,000
Referees: Anton Makhlin (RUS), Gintaras Vitkauskas (LTU), Gizella Györgyi (NOR)

24 February 2016
19:00

Boxscore

**Croatia**	**71**–57	Netherlands
Scoring by quarter: **22**–12, **24**–15, 12–**16**, 13–**14**
Pts: Zellous 20; Rebs: Lelas, Režan 7 Asts: four players 2		Pts: Bettonvil 14; Rebs: Halman 11; Asts: Adams, Bettonvil 1

Gradski vrt Hall, Osijek
Attendance: 1,200
Referees: Boris Gabara (SVK), Tamás Benczur (HUN), Ventsislav Velikov (BUL)

19 November 2016
18:00

Boxscore

**Croatia**	**86**–45	Estonia
Scoring by quarter: **23**–9, **20**–12, **17**–14, **26**–10
Pts: Premasunac 13; Rebs: Premasunac 8 Asts: Lelas 5		Pts: Püü 18; Rebs: Bratka 8 Asts: Püü 5

Športska dvorana Trnsko, Zagreb
Attendance: 700
Referees: Elena Chernova (RUS), Gellért Kapitány (HUN), Goran Šljivić (AUT)

19 November 2016
18:30

Boxscore

**France**	**79**–46	Netherlands
Scoring by quarter: **19**–6, **16**–5, **24**–13, 20–**22**
Pts: Miyem 14; Rebs: Filip 10; Asts: Dumerc, Johannès 5		Pts: Ndiba 9 Rebs: Bettonvil 4 Asts: Bröring 3

Le Colisée, Chalon-sur-Saône
Attendance: 4,250
Referees: Francisco Araña (ESP), Viola Györgyi (NOR), Sonia Teixeira (POR)

23 November 2016
20:00

Boxscore

**Netherlands**	**70**–46	Estonia
Scoring by quarter: **19**–7, **19**–16, **15**–9, **17**–14
Pts: Hof 14; Rebs: J. Bettonvil 9 Asts: Bröring 8		Pts: Mesila-Kaarmann 19; Rebs: Mesila-Kaarmann 6 Asts: three players 2

Sporthallen Zuid, Amsterdam
Attendance: 1,000
Referees: Carlos Santos (POR), Anna Cardus (ESP), Svetlana Stoyanova (BUL)

23 November 2016
20:30

Boxscore

**France**	**84**–65	Croatia
Scoring by quarter: **22**–13, **24**–12, **23**–22, 15–**18**
Pts: Miyem 17; Rebs: Ciak, Gaye 6 Asts: Michel 7		Pts: Lelas 13; Rebs: Tikvić 7 Asts: Lelas 3

Clermont-Ferrand Sports Hall, Clermont-Ferrand
Attendance: 4,400
Referees: Fernando Calatrava (ESP), Sonia Teixeira (POR), Simon Unsworth (ENG)

=== Group C ===
Pos	Team	Pld	W	L	PF	PA	PD	Pts	Qualification
1	Italy	6	5	1	452	300	+152	**11**	Final tournament
2	Montenegro	6	4	2	480	344	+136	**10**	Final tournament
3	Great Britain	6	3	3	454	367	+87	**9**	
4	Albania	6	0	6	264	639	−375	**6**	

Source: FIBA
Rules for classification: 1) points; 2) Head-to-head; 3) Points difference; 4) Points scored.

21 November 2015
18:15

Boxscore

**Italy**	**121**–38	Albania
Scoring by quarter: **32**–8, **29**–11, **31**–4, **29**–15
Pts: Bestagno 17; Rebs: three players 7 Asts: Sottana 8		Pts: Llazar 9 Rebs: Aliaj 4 Asts: eight players 1

Palatagliate, Lucca
Attendance: 1,263
Referees: Bernard Vassallo (MLT), Ilona Kučerová (CZE), Samira Barrima (POR)

21 November 2015
20:15

Boxscore

**Montenegro**	**78**–64	Great Britain
Scoring by quarter: 17–**19**, **25**–9, 16–**23**, **20**–13
Pts: Robinson 20; Rebs: Robinson 11; Asts: Škerović 7		Pts: Leedham 20; Rebs: Leedham 13; Asts: Leedham 5

Morača Sports Center, Podgorica
Attendance: 1,100
Referees: Petar Denkovski (MKD), Ivan Miličević (BIH), Ciprian Stoica (ROU)

25 November 2015
19:00

Boxscore

Great Britain	48–**60**	**Italy**
Scoring by quarter: **16**–7, 7–**22**, 14–**17**, 11–**14**
Pts: Handy 16; Rebs: Leedham 10; Asts: Jones 4		Pts: Macchi 27; Rebs: Gorini, Nadalin 9 Asts: Masciadri 2

Amaechi Centre, Manchester
Attendance: 750
Referees: Andris Aunkrogers (LAT), Özlem Yalman (TUR), Henri Hilke (FIN)

25 November 2015
20:30

Boxscore

**Montenegro**	**99**–39	Albania
Scoring by quarter: **21**–15, **21**–8, **23**–7, **34**–9
Pts: Mujović 19; Rebs: Perovanović 8 Asts: Mujović, Škerović 5		Pts: Zykaj 13; Rebs: Aliaj, Lalaj 7 Asts: Aliaj 3

Morača Sports Center, Podgorica
Attendance: 560
Referees: Ademir Zurapović (BIH), Emin Moğulkoç (TUR), Vasiliki Tsaroucha (GRE)

20 February 2016
19:00

Boxscore

**Italy**	**57**–56	Montenegro
Scoring by quarter: **14**–9, 15–15, 11–**20**, **17**–12
Pts: Ress 12; Rebs: Cinili 9 Asts: Dotto, Macchi 5		Pts: Perovanović 21; Rebs: Dubljević 8 Asts: Škerović 4

Pala Campagnola, Schio
Attendance: 2,500
Referees: Charalampos Karakatsounis (GRE), Milan Nedović (SLO), Nikola Perlić (CRO)

20 February 2016
19:00

Boxscore

**Great Britain**	**122**–36	Albania
Scoring by quarter: **35**–9, **28**–13, **32**–7, **27**–7
Pts: Leedham 22; Rebs: Clark 17; Asts: Leedham, Vanderwal 6		Pts: Xhanaj 9 Rebs: Xhanaj 7 Asts: Bujari 2

Belle Vue Sports Village, Manchester
Attendance: 1,000
Referees: Rune Larsen (DEN), Bert van Slooten (NED), Samira Barrima (POR)

24 February 2016
18:00

Boxscore

Albania	40–**86**	**Italy**
Scoring by quarter: 8–**19**, 16–**27**, 6–**22**, 10–**18**
Pts: Bujari 13; Rebs: Xhanaj 6 Asts: Bujari 3		Pts: Sottana 14; Rebs: Bestagno 8 Asts: Dotto 6

Asllan Rusi Sports Palace, Tirana
Attendance: 300
Referees: Bernard Vassallo (MLT), Igor Poljanšek (SLO), Özlem Yalman (TUR)

24 February 2016
19:00

Boxscore

**Great Britain**	**71**–67	Montenegro
Scoring by quarter: 17–**23**, **16**–12, 15–**19**, **23**–13
Pts: Leedham 28; Rebs: Clark 12; Asts: Leedham 6		Pts: Dubljević 22; Rebs: Dubljević 10; Asts: Aleksić 3

Belle Vue Sports Village, Manchester
Attendance: 500
Referees: Mehdi Difallah (FRA), Andrada Csender (ROU), Bert van Slooten (NED)

19 November 2016
18:00

Boxscore

Albania	56–**114**	**Montenegro**
Scoring by quarter: 12–**30**, 14–**27**, 17–**38**, 13–**19**
Pts: Qypi 24; Rebs: Lalaj, Permeti 6 Asts: Bujari 3		Pts: Perovanović 21; Rebs: Dubljević 10; Asts: Škerović 6

Asllan Rusi Sports Palace, Tirana
Attendance: 300
Referees: Aleksander Pavlov (MKD), Dragan Kralj (BIH), Marko Vučković (SLO)

19 November 2016
20:45

Boxscore

**Italy**	**71**–52	Great Britain
Scoring by quarter: **20**–15, **16**–8, 17–17, **18**–12
Pts: Macchi 23; Rebs: Ress 10; Asts: Macchi 5		Pts: Stewart 19; Rebs: Stewart 13; Asts: Leedham 5

Palatagliate, Lucca
Attendance: 1,300
Referees: Jelena Tomić (CRO), Antonis Demetriou (CYP), Ernad Karović (BIH)

23 November 2016
18:00

Boxscore

**Montenegro**	**66**–57	Italy
Scoring by quarter: **13**–12, **18**–11, 18–18, **17**–16
Pts: Dubljević 29; Rebs: Dubljević, Škerović 6 Asts: Škerović 5		Pts: Macchi 15; Rebs: Macchi 6 Asts: Dotto 4

Morača Sports Center, Podgorica
Attendance: 1,130
Referees: Yener Yılmaz (TUR), Nikolaos Somos (GRE), Milen Tsvetkov (BUL)

23 November 2016
18:00

Boxscore

Albania	55–**97**	**Great Britain**
Scoring by quarter: 16–**25**, 11–**22**, 15–**21**, 13–**29**
Pts: Bujari 13; Rebs: Xhanaj 11; Asts: Xhanaj 4		Pts: Handy 31; Rebs: Handy, Wilkinson 10; Asts: Collins 10

Asllan Rusi Sports Palace, Tirana
Attendance: 200
Referees: Özlem Yalman (TUR), Mila Čavara (BIH), Jelena Smiljanić (SRB)

=== Group D ===
Pos	Team	Pld	W	L	PF	PA	PD	Pts	Qualification
1	Ukraine	6	6	0	492	372	+120	**12**	Final tournament
2	Serbia	6	4	2	540	378	+162	**10**	Final tournament
3	Germany	6	2	4	422	419	+3	**8**	
4	Luxembourg	6	0	6	269	554	−285	**6**	

Source: FIBA
Rules for classification: 1) points; 2) Head-to-head; 3) Points difference; 4) Points scored.

21 November 2015
18:30

Boxscore

**Ukraine**	**90**–38	Luxembourg
Scoring by quarter: **23**–16, **16**–9, **28**–2, **23**–11
Pts: Dorogobuzova 20; Rebs: Dorogobuzova 8 Asts: Dubrovina 6		Pts: Mossong 10; Rebs: Orban 10; Asts: Hetting 3

Sports Palace, Kyiv
Attendance: 2,000
Referees: Alakbar Hasanov (AZE), Svetlana Stoyanova (BUL), Michał Proc (POL)

21 November 2015
19:00

Boxscore

**Serbia**	**100**–57	Germany
Scoring by quarter: **23**–17, **25**–12, **28**–18, **24**–10
Pts: Milovanović 24; Rebs: Page 5 Asts: A. Dabović, Radočaj 6		Pts: Greinacher 16; Rebs: Fikiel 9 Asts: Bär 4

Hall Aleksandar Nikolić, Belgrade
Attendance: 6,500
Referees: Manuel Mazzoni (ITA), Mehdi Difallah (FRA), Martin Horozov (BUL)

25 November 2015
19:00

Boxscore

Germany	64–**66**	**Ukraine**
Scoring by quarter: 19–**23**, 18–**21**, **16**–13, **11**–9
Pts: three players 10; Rebs: Fikiel, Greinacher 8 Asts: Mersch, Bär 3		Pts: Iagupova 22; Rebs: three players 7 Asts: Dubrovina 5

Sporthalle Georg-Gassmann-Stadion, Marburg
Attendance: 820
Referees: Vilius Mačiulaitis (LTU), Ilona Kučerová (CZE), Vincent Delestrée (BEL)

25 November 2015
19:00

Boxscore

Luxembourg	38–**132**	**Serbia**
Scoring by quarter: 9–**25**, 10–**34**, 6–**35**, 13–**38**
Pts: three players 7 Rebs: Orban 5 Asts: Mossong 3		Pts: Petrović 28; Rebs: Čađo, Milovanović 6 Asts: Mandić, Petrović 4

d'Coque, Luxembourg
Attendance: 289
Referees: Carole Delauné (FRA), Bernard Vassallo (MLT), Adalsteinn Hjartarson (SUI)

20 February 2016
17:30

Boxscore

**Ukraine**	**78**–75	Serbia
Scoring by quarter: 9–**14**, 22–**25**, **25**–16, **22**–20
Pts: Iagupova 31; Rebs: Dorohobuzova 7 Asts: Dubrovina 8		Pts: Milovanović 16; Rebs: Butulija, M. Dabović 5 Asts: A. Dabović 5

Sports Palace, Kyiv
Attendance: 4,000
Referees: Janusz Calik (POL), Zafer Yılmaz (TUR), Mindaugas Večerskis (LTU)

20 February 2016
19:30

Boxscore

**Germany**	**80**–36	Luxembourg
Scoring by quarter: **21**–11, **29**–8, **17**–8, **13**–9
Pts: Skuballa 14; Rebs: Fikiel, Skuballa 7 Asts: three players 3		Pts: Schmit 13; Rebs: Diederich, Hetting 3 Asts: Geniets 2

Hermann-Kessler Halle, Nördlingen
Attendance: 1,180
Referees: Jonas Bille (DEN), Kate Webb (ENG), Milan Adamović (BIH)

24 February 2016
19:00

Boxscore

Luxembourg	52–**85**	**Ukraine**
Scoring by quarter: 18–**20**, 9–**20**, 17–**22**, 8–**23**
Pts: Hetting 18; Rebs: Jablonowski 7 Asts: Jablonowski 3		Pts: Iagupova 18; Rebs: Khomenchuk 7 Asts: Iagupova 5

Centre Culturel et Sportif Am Sand, Oberanven
Attendance: 150
Referees: Adalsteinn Hjartarson (SUI), Anthonie Sinterniklaas (NED), Samira Barrima (POR)

24 February 2016
19:30

Boxscore

Germany	66–**78**	**Serbia**
Scoring by quarter: 20–**21**, **20**–17, 11–**16**, 15–**24**
Pts: Skuballa 15; Rebs: Greinacher 8 Asts: Greinacher 4		Pts: A. Dabović 21; Rebs: Page 11; Asts: Milovanović 7

Badria Halle, Wasserburg
Attendance: 990
Referees: Mathieu Hosselet (FRA), Michał Proc (POL), Artūras Šukys (LTU)

19 November 2016
17:00

Boxscore

**Ukraine**	**85**–61	Germany
Scoring by quarter: **19**–18, **24**–9, **18**–14, **24**–20
Pts: Iagupova, Malashenko 19; Rebs: Malashenko 10; Asts: Dubrovina 8		Pts: Brunckhorst 17; Rebs: Fikiel 12; Asts: Brodersen 3

SK Kraina, Odesa
Attendance: 1,500
Referees: Andrada Csender (ROU), Alakbar Hasanov (AZE), Charalampos Karakatsounis (GRE)

19 November 2016
19:00

Boxscore

**Serbia**	**73**–51	Luxembourg
Scoring by quarter: 21–**23**, **15**–6, **16**–8, **21**–14
Pts: M. Dabović 14; Rebs: Crvendakić 11; Asts: M. Dabović 5		Pts: Mossong 18; Rebs: Mossong 7 Asts: Schmit 6

Kraljevo Sports Hall, Kraljevo
Attendance: 3,500
Referees: Özlem Yalman (TUR), Gordon Barbara (MLT), Erion Hoxhaj (ALB)

23 November 2016
18:00

Boxscore

Serbia	82–**88**	**Ukraine**
Scoring by quarter: 20–**27**, 19–**22**, **26**–20, 17–**19**
Pts: Petrović 24; Rebs: Ajduković 10; Asts: A. Dabović, Jovanović 5		Pts: Iagupova 22; Rebs: Dorohobuzova 10; Asts: Iagupova 7

Čair Hall, Niš
Attendance: 4,000
Referees: Andris Aunkrogers (LAT), Tanel Suslov (EST), Vasiliki Tsaroucha (GRE)

23 November 2016
19:00

Boxscore

Luxembourg	54–**94**	**Germany**
Scoring by quarter: 16–**22**, 12–**27**, 11–**20**, 15–**25**
Pts: Schmit 14; Rebs: Orban 7 Asts: Orban, Schmit 2		Pts: Greinacher 25; Rebs: Fikiel 7 Asts: Hebecker 5

d'Coque, Luxembourg
Attendance: 250
Referees: Bert van Slooten (NED), Samira Barrima (POR), Mariann Miklosik (SCO)

=== Group E ===
Pos	Team	Pld	W	L	PF	PA	PD	Pts	Qualification
1	Hungary	6	5	1	417	344	+73	**11**	Final tournament
2	Slovakia	6	4	2	391	305	+86	**10**	Final tournament
3	Iceland	6	2	4	353	429	−76	**8**	
4	Portugal	6	1	5	293	376	−83	**7**	

Source: FIBA
Rules for classification: 1) points; 2) Head-to-head; 3) Points difference; 4) Points scored.

21 November 2015
19:00

Boxscore

**Slovakia**	**56**–43	Portugal
Scoring by quarter: **18**–6, **10**–9, 10–**13**, **18**–15
Pts: Páleníková 13; Rebs: Jurčenková 11; Asts: three players 3		Pts: S. da Silva 21; Rebs: S. da Silva 10; Asts: Viana 4

Aréna Poprad, Poprad
Attendance: 1,920
Referees: Georgios Poursanidis (GRE), Kate Webb (ENG), Jelena Smiljanić (SRB)

21 November 2015
20:15

Boxscore

**Hungary**	**72**–50	Iceland
Scoring by quarter: **15**–14, **26**–11, **15**–11, **16**–14
Pts: Krivačević 27; Rebs: Fegyverneky 7 Asts: Fegyverneky 5		Pts: Sverrisdóttir 16; Rebs: Þrastardóttir 9 Asts: Sverrisdóttir 4

Generali Arena, Miskolc
Attendance: 1,000
Referees: Jelena Tomić (CRO), Andrada Csender (ROU), Mila Čavara (BIH)

25 November 2015
19:30

Boxscore

Iceland	55–**72**	**Slovakia**
Scoring by quarter: 11–**19**, **22**–21, 10–**12**, 12–**20**
Pts: Sverrisdottir 16; Rebs: Sverrisdottir 6 Asts: Sverrisdottir 10		Pts: Jurčenková 18; Rebs: Jurčenková 18; Asts: Bálintová 8

Laugardalshöll, Reykjavík
Attendance: 1,178
Referees: Simon Unsworth (ENG), Mariann Miklosik (SCO), Gizella Györgyi (NOR)

25 November 2015
20:00

Boxscore

Portugal	50–**67**	**Hungary**
Scoring by quarter: 11–**14**, **16**–14, 7–**23**, 16–16
Pts: S. da Silva 15; Rebs: S. da Silva 12; Asts: Viana 4		Pts: Krivačević 20; Rebs: Fegyverneky 11; Asts: Simon 7

Pavilhão Municipal Capitão Adriano Nordeste, Ílhavo
Attendance: 1,500
Referees: Mathieu Hosselet (FRA), Francisco Araña (ESP), Gintaras Vitkauskas (LTU)

20 February 2016
18:30

Boxscore

**Portugal**	**68**–56	Iceland
Scoring by quarter: 11–**14**, **18**–11, **14**–9, **25**–22
Pts: Lopes 16; Rebs: L. da Silva 7 Asts: Lopes 5		Pts: Sverrisdóttir 17; Rebs: Sverrisdóttir 12; Asts: Sverrisdóttir 5

Pavilhão Municipal Capitão Adriano Nordeste, Ílhavo
Attendance: 1,000
Referees: Susana Gómez (ESP), Yener Yılmaz (TUR), Maciej Nazimek (IRL)

20 February 2016
19:30

Boxscore

**Hungary**	**65**–64	Slovakia
Scoring by quarter: **17**–13, 9–**11**, 9–**12**, **30**–28
Pts: Quigley 27; Rebs: Határ 8 Asts: Fegyverneky 6		Pts: Slamová 18; Rebs: Hruščáková 10; Asts: Bálintová, Páleníková 6

Lauber Dezső Sports Hall, Pécs
Attendance: 2,200
Referees: Georgios Poursanidis (GRE), Boris Krejic (SLO), Mila Čavara (BIH)

24 February 2016
19:30

Boxscore

**Iceland**	**87**–77	Hungary
Scoring by quarter: **22**–15, **24**–20, **22**–21, 19–**21**
Pts: Sverrisdóttir 29; Rebs: Sverrisdóttir 16; Asts: Sverrisdóttir 8		Pts: Krivačević 24; Rebs: Krivačević 9 Asts: Fegyverneky 7

Laugardalshöll, Reykjavík
Attendance: 1,100
Referees: Rune Larsen (DEN), Henri Hilke (FIN), Per-Kristian Larsen (NOR)

24 February 2016
20:30

Boxscore

Portugal	34–**64**	**Slovakia**
Scoring by quarter: 9–**24**, 6–**12**, 6–**19**, **13**–9
Pts: Livulo 13; Rebs: Livulo 10; Asts: Viana 2		Pts: Žirková 18; Rebs: Jurčenková 11; Asts: Jurčenková, Slamová 4

Pavilhão Municipal Capitão Adriano Nordeste, Ílhavo
Attendance: 2,500
Referees: Francisco Araña (ESP), Mathieu Bayot (FRA), Robert Hickman (ENG)

19 November 2016
18:00

Boxscore

**Slovakia**	**86**–40	Iceland
Scoring by quarter: **26**–6, **15**–12, **25**–12, **20**–10
Pts: Růžičková 20; Rebs: Růžičková 10; Asts: Lazarová 5		Pts: Ámundadóttir 7 Rebs: Þrastardóttir 7 Asts: Ámundadóttir 3

Diplomat Aréna, Piešťany
Attendance: 900
Referees: Nikola Perlić (CRO), Alexander Eger (AUT), Ivana Ivanović (SRB)

19 November 2016
20:00

Boxscore

**Hungary**	**68**–44	Portugal
Scoring by quarter: **22**–13, **17**–12, **16**–11, **13**–8
Pts: Fegyverneky 12; Rebs: Fegyverneky, Krivačević 9 Asts: Vandersloot 5		Pts: S. da Silva 13; Rebs: S. da Silva 11; Asts: Neves 3

Lauber Dezső Sports Hall, Pécs
Attendance: 1,800
Referees: Tomislav Vovk (CRO), Ilona Kučerová (CZE), Zafer Yılmaz (TUR)

23 November 2016
18:00

Boxscore

Slovakia	49–**68**	**Hungary**
Scoring by quarter: 9–**18**, 10–**16**, **18**–17, 12–**17**
Pts: Hruščáková 11; Rebs: Tetemondová 8 Asts: Slamová 5		Pts: Krivačević 19; Rebs: Krivačević, Vandersloot 6 Asts: Fegyverneky, Vandersloot 4

Diplomat Aréna, Piešťany
Attendance: 900
Referees: Jasmina Juras (SRB), Jelena Tomić (CRO), Dariusz Zapolski (POL)

23 November 2016
19:30

Boxscore

**Iceland**	**65**–54	Portugal
Scoring by quarter: 6–**14**, **25**–15, **18**–14, **16**–11
Pts: Ámundadóttir 16; Rebs: Ámundadóttir 8 Asts: Gunnarsdóttir, Þrastardóttir 3		Pts: Domingues 15; Rebs: L. da Silva 12; Asts: Correia, Neves 3

Laugardalshöll, Reykjavík
Attendance: 903
Referees: Karolina Andersson (FIN), Rickard Eriksson (SWE), Paul Unsworth (ENG)

=== Group F ===
Pos	Team	Pld	W	L	PF	PA	PD	Pts	Qualification
1	Russia	6	6	0	433	312	+121	**12**	Final tournament
2	Greece	6	4	2	439	325	+114	**10**	Final tournament
3	Bulgaria	6	2	4	342	420	−78	**8**	
4	Switzerland	6	0	6	291	448	−157	**6**	

Source: FIBA
Rules for classification: 1) points; 2) Head-to-head; 3) Points difference; 4) Points scored.

21 November 2015
14:00

Boxscore

**Russia**	**72**–39	Bulgaria
Scoring by quarter: **19**–8, **19**–6, 17–17, **17**–8
Pts: Cherepanova, Vadeeva 14; Rebs: Vidmer 9 Asts: Beglova 5		Pts: Ivanova 11; Rebs: Quinn 4 Asts: four players 1

Palace of Sports "Uralochka", Yekaterinburg
Attendance: 4,000
Referees: Dragan Nešković (SRB), Özlem Yalman (TUR), Aleksandar Milojević (MKD)

21 November 2015
17:00

Boxscore

**Greece**	**83**–46	Switzerland
Scoring by quarter: **31**–17, **14**–11, **16**–9, **22**–9
Pts: Kaltsidou 23; Rebs: Kosma 9 Asts: Chatzinikolaou 6		Pts: Rol 14; Rebs: Giroud 11; Asts: Giroud 8

Esperos Indoor Hall, Chalcis
Attendance: 3,000
Referees: Maka Kupatadze (GEO), Ivana Ivanović (SRB), Alin Faur (ROU)

25 November 2015
18:00

Boxscore

Bulgaria	40–**74**	**Greece**
Scoring by quarter: 11–**19**, 10–**23**, 10–**15**, 9–**17**
Pts: R. S. Dimitrova 11; Rebs: Zlatanova 12; Asts: Quinn 3		Pts: Maltsi 21; Rebs: Kaltsidou 12; Asts: Maltsi 4

Bulstrad Arena, Ruse
Attendance: 2,000
Referees: Maka Kupatadze (GEO), Mila Čavara (BIH), Ivana Ivanović (SRB)

25 November 2015
20:00

Boxscore

Switzerland	48–**86**	**Russia**
Scoring by quarter: **15**–14, 9–**27**, 6–**25**, 18–**20**
Pts: Twehues 16; Rebs: Giroud 9 Asts: Thalmann 5		Pts: Vadeeva 23; Rebs: Vidmer 10; Asts: Beglova, Belyakova 4

Site Sportif Saint-Leonard, Fribourg
Attendance: 250
Referees: Sonia Teixeira (POR), Andrada Csender (ROU), Jelena Smiljanić (SRB)

20 February 2016
17:00

Boxscore

Greece	66–**67**	**Russia**
Scoring by quarter: 11–**15**, **21**–16, **21**–20, 13–**16**
Pts: Maltsi 22; Rebs: Dimitrákou 6 Asts: Dimitrákou 5		Pts: Belyakova, Osipova 15; Rebs: Vidmer 10; Asts: Belyakova 7

Tasos Kambouris Hall, Chalcis
Attendance: 2,000
Referees: Jasmina Juras (SRB), Kfir Mualem (ISR), Ilona Kučerová (CZE)

20 February 2016
18:00

Boxscore

**Bulgaria**	**74**–55	Switzerland
Scoring by quarter: **20**–9, **15**–9, **15**–12, 24–**25**
Pts: Peteva 19; Rebs: Miteva 10; Asts: Kostova 5		Pts: Rol 15; Rebs: Giroud, Rol 9 Asts: Giroud 4

Bulstrad Arena, Ruse
Attendance: 1,000
Referees: Jelena Tomić (CRO), Özlem Yalman (TUR), Ivana Ivanović (SRB)

24 February 2016
18:00

Boxscore

Bulgaria	50–**76**	**Russia**
Scoring by quarter: 12–**18**, 13–**17**, 16–**21**, 9–**20**
Pts: Kostova, Zlatanova 13; Rebs: Miteva, Tomova 6 Asts: R. S. Dimitrova 4		Pts: Vadeeva 15; Rebs: Vidmer 10; Asts: five players 3

Bulstrad Arena, Ruse
Attendance: 1,000
Referees: Ciprian Stoica (ROU), Aleksander Pavlov (MKD), Ervin Koci (ALB)

24 February 2016
20:00

Boxscore

Switzerland	38–**68**	**Greece**
Scoring by quarter: 6–**17**, 15–**20**, 7–**13**, 10–**18**
Pts: Twehues 11; Rebs: Giroud 13; Asts: Giroud, Kershaw 2		Pts: Kaltsidou 17; Rebs: Chatzinikolaou 8 Asts: three players 4

Site Sportif Saint-Leonard, Fribourg
Attendance: 200
Referees: Michel Glod (LUX), Jelena Smiljanić (SRB), Bo Bundgaard (DEN)

19 November 2016
16:00

Boxscore

**Greece**	**95**–67	Bulgaria
Scoring by quarter: **21**–19, **28**–16, **20**–19, **26**–13
Pts: Kaltsidou 20; Rebs: Dimitrákou, Nikolopoulou 7 Asts: Maltsi 6		Pts: R. S. Dimitrova 18; Rebs: Voynova 6 Asts: R. S. Dimitrova, Ivanova 3

Tasos Kampouris Hall, Chalcis
Attendance: 1,000
Referees: Jelena Smiljanić (SRB), Kfir Mualem (ISR), Dumitru Stasiev (MDA)

19 November 2016
18:00

Boxscore

**Russia**	**65**–56	Switzerland
Scoring by quarter: **13**–9, **21**–9, 20–20, 11–**18**
Pts: Musina 17; Rebs: Musina 9 Asts: Beliakova 6		Pts: Rol 17; Rebs: Giroud 9 Asts: Turin 3

Sport and Concert Complex, Kursk
Attendance: 3,500
Referees: Karolina Andersson (FIN), Mila Čavara (BIH), Ruslan Khaligov (AZE)

23 November 2016
19:00

Boxscore

**Russia**	**67**–53	Greece
Scoring by quarter: **13**–8, **29**–9, 20–**22**, 5–**14**
Pts: Vadeeva 20; Rebs: four players 5 Asts: Vidmer 6		Pts: Dimitrákou, Kaltsidou 12; Rebs: Kaltsidou 6 Asts: Chatzinikolaou 4

Sport and Concert Complex, Kursk
Attendance: 3,500
Referees: Andrada Csender (ROU), Alakbar Hasanov (AZE), Maka Kupatadze (GEO)

23 November 2016
20:00

Boxscore

Switzerland	48–**72**	**Bulgaria**
Scoring by quarter: **18**–16, 11–**15**, 11–**23**, 8–**18**
Pts: Rol 15; Rebs: Giroud 6 Asts: Giroud 3		Pts: Peteva 19; Rebs: Tomova 9 Asts: R. S. Dimitrova 8

Site Sportif Saint-Leonard, Fribourg
Attendance: 200
Referees: Michele Rossi (ITA), Shane Bassett (GIB), Pascale Weiwers (LUX)

=== Group G ===
Pos	Team	Pld	W	L	PF	PA	PD	Pts	Qualification
1	Belgium	4	3	1	315	261	+54	**7**	Final tournament
2	Belarus	4	2	2	272	265	+7	**6**	Final tournament
3	Poland	4	1	3	251	312	−61	**5**	

Source: FIBA
Rules for classification: 1) points; 2) Head-to-head; 3) Points difference; 4) Points scored.

21 November 2015
18:00

Boxscore

**Poland**	**65**–56	Belarus
Scoring by quarter: 9–**20**, 21–**22**, **16**–13, **19**–1
Pts: Żurowska 20; Rebs: McBride 12; Asts: McBride 3		Pts: Papova 13; Rebs: Leuchanka 14; Asts: Snytsina 5

Hala Widowiskowo-Sportowa Aqua Zdrój, Wałbrzych
Attendance: 1,500
Referees: Mart Uuehendrik (EST), Karolina Andersson (FIN), Juris Kokainis (LAT)

25 November 2015
18:30

Boxscore

**Belarus**	**76**–71	Belgium
Scoring by quarter: **26**–22, 12–**14**, **23**–16, 15–**19**
Pts: Verameyenka 24; Rebs: Verameyenka 14; Asts: Harding 6		Pts: Meesseman 31; Rebs: Meesseman 17; Asts: Meesseman 5

Palace of Sports, Minsk
Attendance: 3,200
Referees: Yener Yılmaz (TUR), Sergei Beliakov (RUS), Ivor Matějek (CZE)

20 February 2016
20:00

Boxscore

**Belgium**	**100**–63	Poland
Scoring by quarter: **18**–16, **27**–12, **25**–15, **30**–20
Pts: Mestdagh 30; Rebs: Meesseman 14; Asts: Carpréaux 12		Pts: Kobryn 16; Rebs: Żurowska-Cegielska 4 Asts: Śnieżek 2

Hall Octave Henry, Namur
Attendance: 1,200
Referees: Ivan Milićević (BIH), Sonia Teixeira (POR), Haydn Jones (WAL)

24 February 2016
18:30

Boxscore

**Belarus**	**79**–62	Poland
Scoring by quarter: **24**–9, **22**–16, 15–**27**, **18**–10
Pts: Verameyenka 19; Rebs: Verameyenka 8 Asts: Troina 6		Pts: Stankiewicz 18; Rebs: Koc, Żurowska-Cegielska 5 Asts: McBride 4

Palace of Sports, Minsk
Attendance: 3,000
Referees: Anastasios Manos (GRE), Sergii Tyslenko (UKR), Alakbar Hasanov (AZE)

19 November 2016
20:05

Boxscore

**Belgium**	**67**–61	Belarus
Scoring by quarter: **20**–19, **16**–15, **17**–11, 14–**16**
Pts: Mestdagh 17; Rebs: Wauters 6 Asts: Carpreaux 7		Pts: Verameyenka 19; Rebs: Verameyenka 11; Asts: Likhtarovich 5

Hall Octave Henry, Namur
Attendance: 500
Referees: Susana Gómez (ESP), Maciej Nazimek (IRL), Vasiliki Tsaroucha (GRE)

23 November 2016
20:15

Boxscore

Poland	61–**77**	**Belgium**
Scoring by quarter: 15–**27**, 25–25, 10–**14**, 11–11
Pts: Pawlak 14; Rebs: Szajtauer 5 Asts: Poboży 3		Pts: Wauters 16; Rebs: Meesseman 6 Asts: Carpreaux 6

Hala Widowiskowo-Sportowa Aqua Zdrój, Wałbrzych
Attendance: 1,200
Referees: Juris Kokainis (LAT), Ilona Kučerová (CZE), Mindaugas Večerskis (LTU)

=== Group H ===
Pos	Team	Pld	W	L	PF	PA	PD	Pts	Qualification
1	Turkey	6	5	1	405	333	+72	**11**	Final tournament
2	Israel	6	4	2	411	397	+14	**10**	
3	Romania	6	2	4	358	401	−43	**8**	
4	Bosnia and Herzegovina	6	1	5	394	437	−43	**7**	

Source: FIBA
Rules for classification: 1) points; 2) Head-to-head; 3) Points difference; 4) Points scored.

21 November 2015
19:00

Boxscore

**Romania**	**67**–65	Bosnia and Herzegovina
Scoring by quarter: **27**–17, **18**–14, 7–**14**, 15–**20**
Pts: Mărginean 21; Rebs: Pop 11; Asts: four players 2		Pts: Svitlica 19; Rebs: Gajić 22; Asts: Deura 4

Polyvalent Hall, Cluj-Napoca
Attendance: 5,000
Referees: Petr Hrůša (CZE), Andrei Sharapa (BLR), Vasiliki Tsaroucha (GRE)

21 November 2015
20:00

Boxscore

**Turkey**	**72**–53	Israel
Scoring by quarter: **20**–15, **16**–12, **17**–14, **19**–12
Pts: Çakır 17; Rebs: Sanders 10; Asts: Alben 8		Pts: Clark 17; Rebs: Clark 6 Asts: Levitsky 4

Ankara Arena, Ankara
Attendance: 1,689
Referees: Branislav Mrdak (SRB), Marko Vučković (SLO), Anton Makhlin (RUS)

25 November 2015
19:00

Boxscore

Israel	77–**78**	**Romania**
Scoring by quarter: **21**–20, **21**–14, 14–**18**, 21–**26**
Pts: Clark 27; Rebs: Clark 10; Asts: Doron 6		Pts: Pop 19; Rebs: Pop 8 Asts: Părău 7

Drive in Arena, Tel Aviv
Attendance: 2,110
Referees: Aliaksandr Syrytsa (BLR), Elena Chernova (RUS), Jelena Tomić (CRO)

25 November 2015
20:00

Boxscore

Bosnia and Herzegovina	50–**79**	**Turkey**
Scoring by quarter: 12–**19**, 11–**18**, 14–**18**, 13–**24**
Pts: Deura 10; Rebs: Gajić 16; Asts: Svitlica 3		Pts: Sanders 18; Rebs: Sanders 7 Asts: Cora 7

SKPC Mejdan, Tuzla
Attendance: 1,000
Referees: Mart Uuehendrik (EST), Milan Brziak (SVK), Michał Proc (POL)

20 February 2016
19:00

Boxscore

Romania	45–**56**	**Turkey**
Scoring by quarter: 12–**19**, **16**–10, 12–**15**, 5–**12**
Pts: Mărginean 12; Rebs: Mărginean 7 Asts: four players 2		Pts: Hollingsworth 15; Rebs: three players 7 Asts: Alben 5

Polyvalent Hall, Cluj-Napoca
Attendance: 6,817
Referees: Ognjen Jokić (MNE), Maka Kupatadze (GEO), Mykola Ambrosov (UKR)

20 February 2016
19:40

Boxscore

**Israel**	**76**–72	Bosnia and Herzegovina
Scoring by quarter: 21–**24**, **17**–14, **17**–14, **21**–20
Pts: Doron 22; Rebs: Shafir 5 Asts: Shafir 7		Pts: Kizer 24; Rebs: Gajić, Svitlica 12; Asts: Vrančić 6

Drive in Arena, Tel Aviv
Attendance: 1,300
Referees: Aleksandar Milojević (MKD), Vasiliki Tsaroucha (GRE), Svetlana Stoyanova (BUL)

24 February 2016
19:00

Boxscore

**Israel**	**63**–62	Turkey
Scoring by quarter: 12–**26**, **23**–13, **11**–8, **17**–15
Pts: Clark 16; Rebs: Clark 7 Asts: Doron 7		Pts: Çağlar, Hollingsworth 14; Rebs: Hollingsworth 13; Asts: Alben 7

Drive in Arena, Tel Aviv
Attendance: 1,800
Referees: Jasmina Juras (SRB), Martin Horozov (BUL), Erion Hoxhaj (ALB)

24 February 2016
19:30

Boxscore

**Bosnia and Herzegovina**	**77**–63	Romania
Scoring by quarter: **15**–13, 19–**20**, **17**–8, **26**–22
Pts: Gajić 23; Rebs: Kizer 9 Asts: Kapor 4		Pts: Părău 16; Rebs: Pop 8 Asts: Părău, Pop 3

SKPC Mejdan, Tuzla
Attendance: 1,000
Referees: Anne Panther (GER), Alija Ferevski (MKD), Alexander Eger (AUT)

19 November 2016
18:00

Boxscore

**Turkey**	**72**–68 (OT)	Bosnia and Herzegovina
Scoring by quarter: 13–**19**, **16**–10, **18**–16, 14–**16**, Overtime: **11**–7
Pts: İvegin 16; Rebs: Şenyürek 10; Asts: Alben 9		Pts: Kizer 24; Rebs: Kizer 10; Asts: Deura, Vrančić 5

Ankara Arena, Ankara
Attendance: 1,900
Referees: Maka Kupatadze (GEO), Alija Ferevski (MKD), Svetlana Stoyanova (BUL)

19 November 2016
20:00

Boxscore

Romania	51–**62**	**Israel**
Scoring by quarter: 9–**18**, 8–**17**, **18**–17, **16**–10
Pts: Walker 17; Rebs: Pascalau 7 Asts: Godri-Parau 2		Pts: Doron 22; Rebs: Clark 12; Asts: Levitsky 6

Polyvalent Hall, Cluj-Napoca
Attendance: 4,250
Referees: Jasmina Juras (SRB), Vladyslav Isachenko (UKR), Milen Tsvetkov (BUL)

23 November 2016
18:00

Boxscore

Bosnia and Herzegovina	62–**80**	**Israel**
Scoring by quarter: **20**–19, **20**–15, 12–**23**, 10–**23**
Pts: Kizer 19; Rebs: Kizer 9 Asts: Svitlica 4		Pts: Clark 24; Rebs: Clark 16; Asts: Clark 6

KSC Ilidža Gym, Sarajevo
Attendance: 250
Referees: Petar Denkovski (MKD), Milosav Kaluđerović(MNE), Vladimir Tsekov (BUL)

23 November 2016
20:00

Boxscore

**Turkey**	**64**–54	Romania
Scoring by quarter: **17**–16, **17**–11, 10–**18**, **20**–9
Pts: Şenyürek 17; Rebs: Bilgiç, Çağlar 9 Asts: Günay 4		Pts: Mărginean 14; Rebs: Irimia, Walker 4 Asts: three players 2

Ankara Arena, Ankara
Attendance: 4,500
Referees: Vladan Šundić (MNE), Ivana Ivanović (SRB), Sergii Tyslenko (UKR)

=== Group I ===
Pos	Team	Pld	W	L	PF	PA	PD	Pts	Qualification
1	Spain	4	4	0	326	196	+130	**8**	Final tournament
2	Sweden	4	2	2	250	262	−12	**6**	
3	Finland	4	0	4	193	311	−118	**4**	

Source: FIBA
Rules for classification: 1) points; 2) Head-to-head; 3) Points difference; 4) Points scored.

21 November 2015
17:00

Boxscore

Sweden	52–**75**	**Spain**
Scoring by quarter: 13–**22**, 11–**19**, 14–**21**, **14**–13
Pts: Zahui 17; Rebs: Zahui 8 Asts: E. Eldebrink, F. Eldebrink 3		Pts: Lyttle 24; Rebs: Lyttle 12; Asts: Palau 8

Täljehallen, Södertälje
Attendance: 2,078
Referees: Carole Delauné (FRA), Milan Nedović (SLO), Rain Peerandi (EST)

25 November 2015
20:00

Boxscore

**Spain**	**86**–45	Finland
Scoring by quarter: **20**–10, **29**–5, 16–**17**, **21**–13
Pts: Lyttle 18; Rebs: Cruz 10; Asts: Palau 5		Pts: Rokkanen 13; Rebs: Gross, Lehtoranta 5 Asts: Kesanen 5

Pabellón de Deportes Ángel Nieto, Zamora
Attendance: 1,500
Referees: Johann Jeanneau (FRA), Mathieu Bayot (BEL), Samira Barrima (POR)

20 February 2016
14:00

Boxscore

Finland	49–**59**	**Sweden**
Scoring by quarter: 14–14, **14**–11, 15–**18**, 6–**16**
Pts: Lehtoranta, Pounds 12; Rebs: Korpivaara 8 Asts: Lehtoranta 3		Pts: Barthold 14; Rebs: Zahui 13; Asts: E. Eldebrink 4

Töölö Sports Hall, Helsinki
Attendance: 1,331
Referees: Andris Aunkrogers (LAT), Elena Chernova (RUS), Gizella Györgyi (NOR)

24 February 2016
20:00

Boxscore

**Spain**	**93**–45	Sweden
Scoring by quarter: **27**–12, **22**–6, **20**–16, **24**–11
Pts: Lyttle, Torrens 17; Rebs: Lyttle 7 Asts: Torrens 5		Pts: Zahui 21; Rebs: Zahui 11; Asts: F. Eldebrink 5

Palacio de los Deportes de La Rioja, Logroño
Attendance: 3,000
Referees: Sonia Teixeira (POR), Paul Walton (ENG), Yohan Rosso (FRA)

19 November 2016
19:00

Boxscore

Finland	54–**72**	**Spain**
Scoring by quarter: **21**–16, 8–**17**, 14–**19**, 11–**20**
Pts: Tulonene 14; Rebs: M. Sten 8 Asts: Lahtinen 3		Pts: Rodríguez 12; Rebs: Pascua 8 Asts: Ygueravide Viana 6

Töölö Sports Hall, Helsinki
Attendance: 607
Referees: Martynas Gudas (LTU), Rune Larsen (DEN), Mariann Miklosik (SCO)

23 November 2016
20:00

Boxscore

**Sweden**	**94**–45	Finland
Scoring by quarter: **14**–7, **19**–12, **28**–14, **33**–12
Pts: Zahui 18; Rebs: Zahui 10; Asts: E. Eldebrink 9		Pts: Iiskola, Lahtinen 11; Rebs: Pelander, M. Sten 4 Asts: Lahtinen 5

Pontushallen, Luleå
Attendance: 1,924
Referees: Kate Webb (ENG), Janusz Calik (POL), Viola Györgyi (NOR)

=== Ranking of second-placed teams ===
The six best second-placed teams from the groups qualified for the final tournament. Matches against the fourth-placed team in each group are not included in this ranking.

Pos	Grp	Team	Pld	W	L	PF	PA	PD	Pts	Qualification
1	A	Latvia	4	3	1	280	278	+2	7	Final tournament
2	F	Greece	4	2	2	288	241	+47	6	Final tournament
3	D	Serbia	4	2	2	335	289	+46	6	Final tournament
4	E	Slovakia	4	2	2	271	228	+43	6	Final tournament
5	C	Montenegro	4	2	2	267	249	+18	6	Final tournament
6	G	Belarus	4	2	2	272	265	+7	6	Final tournament
7	H	Israel	4	2	2	255	263	−8	6	
8	I	Sweden	4	2	2	250	262	−12	6	
9	B	Croatia	4	1	3	273	296	−23	5	

Source: FIBA
Rules for classification: 1) points; 2) Points difference; 3) Points scored.
