= Zadruga (disambiguation) =

A zadruga refers to a type of rural community historically common among South Slavs.

Zadruga may also refer to:

- Zadruga (village), a village in Kubrat Municipality, Bulgaria
- Zadruga (movement), a Polish neopagan nationalist movement
- Zadruga (TV series), a Serbian reality TV
