= Melody of the year, Bulgaria =

Melody of the year
- Genre: Pop music
- Locations: Veliko Tarnovo, Bulgaria
- Years active: 1969–1995

Melody of the year was an annual national TV contest in Bulgaria from 1968 to 1995.

The final annual competition was conducted in the dramatic "Konstantin Kisimov" theater in Veliko Tarnovo. The show was led by Inna Simeonova since the mid-1980's. The parent label were Balkanton.

== History ==
The first competition for the best melody of Bulgaria was held in 1968. On 27 January 1967, the first contest Melody of the year 67 was held. The song "Byala tishina" (White Silence) from the pop group Shturtsite received the most points, won the contest and earned the title "Melody of the year". The next year, the competition became Melody of the Month. The winners from these competitions participated in Melody of the year. Silver Yantra (Bulgarian: Сребърна Янтра Srebyrna Yantra) is one of the successors of Melody of the year.

== Winners ==
- 1968 - Lili Ivanova – Bez moeto radio ne moga (I can't without my radio)
- 1969 - Margret Nikolova and Petar Petrov - "We Loved"
- 1970 - Lili Ivanova- "You're Sleeping"
- 1971 - Pasa Hristova - "White Song"
- 1972 - Annie Pavlova - "Our Dear Motherland"
- 1973 - Margarita Hranova - "Far Song"
- 1974 - Lili Ivanova - "Love"
- 1975 - Margarita Hranova - "The Dead Heroes"
- 1976 - Mimi Ivanova - "The sun is in my hair"
- 1977 - Lili Ivanova - "My old friend" and Margarita Hranova - "Song for October"
- 1978 - Bogdan Karadocheva - "Sama with the wind"
- 1979 - Diana Express and Vassil Naydenov - "Adaptation"
- 1980 - Diana Express - "Soul"
- 1981 - Tonika SV - "Friends"
- 1982 - Vasil Naydenov - "Phone Love"
- 1983 - FSB (band) - "We're Still Embracing"
- 1984 - Rositsa Kirilova - "Love forever"
- 1985 - Vasil Naydenov - "Goodbye, I said"
- 1986 - FSB (band) - "I love you here" and VG Trick - "Sixth sense"
- 1987 - Sylvia Katsarova - "Hot Rain"
- 1988 - Kristina Dimitrova and Orlin Goranov - "With Today"
- 1989 - Riton (Bulgarian duet) - "Where My Eyes Meen"
- 1991 - "Medicus" - "The Century of Love"
- 1992 - Georgi Hristov - "Do not Regret"
- 1995 - Veselin Marinov - "Bitter Wine"

== Sources ==
- Magazine "Nasha Rodina", Bulgaria - 1969,1970,1974,1987
- Music plate Bulgarian television - Melody of the year (Българска телевизия - Мелодия на годината 1969)
- Поля Иванова Първа програма (Канал 1) на БНТ през периода 1959-2000 г. Поля Иванова(First Program (Channel 1) of the Bulgarian National Television between 1959 and 2000. Polya Ivanova)
