= Kubrat (town) =

Kubrat Кубрат
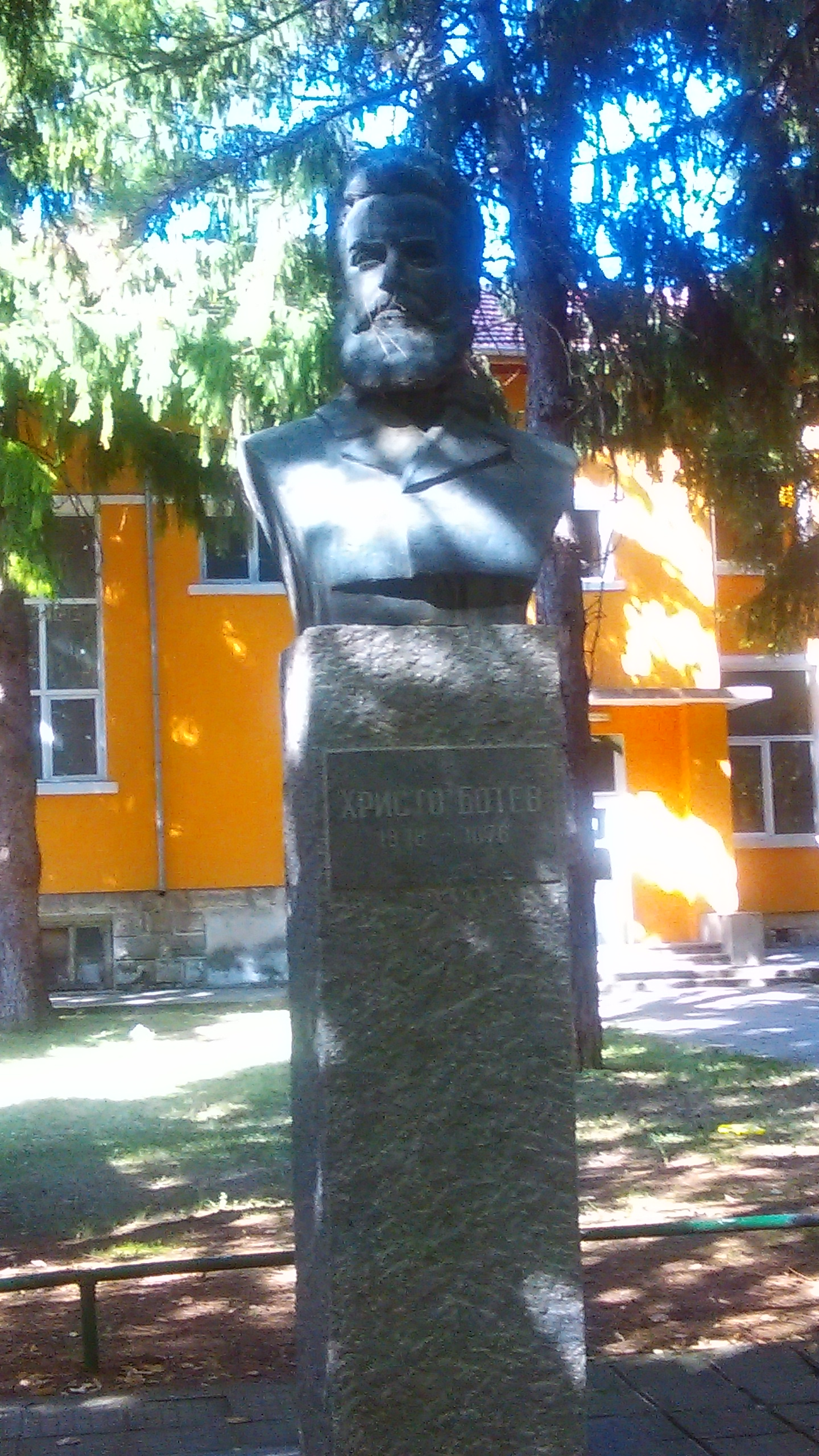

- Location of Kubrat
- Coordinates: 43°48′N 26°30′E
- Country: Bulgaria
- Province (Oblast): Razgrad
- Municipality: Kubrat

Government
  - Mayor: Byurhan Myuzelifov
- Elevation: 201 m (659 ft)

Population (2009-12-31)
  - Total: 8,118
- Time zone: UTC+2 (EET)
  - Summer (DST): UTC+3 (EEST)
- Postal Code: 7300
- Area code: 0838

Kubrat (Bulgarian: Кубрат;) is a town in Razgrad Province, Northeastern Bulgaria, part of the Ludogorie region. Named after the Bulgar ruler Kubrat, it is the administrative centre of the homonymous Kubrat Municipality. As of December 2009, the town had a population of 8,118.

A notable native is famous singer Lili Ivanova. The population is ethnically diverse, with a mixture of ethnic Bulgarians and Bulgarian Turks constituting the majority of the local population

== History ==
The first documented mention of the city is from 1624, while the legend says it was founded in the 15th century. During the Ottoman rule of Bulgaria, it was known as Balbunar ("Honey well") in Turkish, as the town was centred on the Copper Well that is now the town square. A primary school was founded in 1890 and the Cyril and Methodius community centre (chitalishte) followed on 4 May 1891. The then village acquired its present name in 1934 and was proclaimed a town in 1949.

An influx of investment has come from Bulgarians and other nationals since EU accession in 2007 leading to a boost to the local economy. The town is now serviced by over five builders merchants which is an indication of the expansion and renovation that is currently going on in the area.
