= OZK Arena Ruse =

Indoor arena in Ruse, Bulgaria

Arena Ruse
- Арена Русе
- The arena, pictured in 2016, when it was then known as Bulstrad Arena

- Location within Bulgaria
- Former names: Bulstrad Arena (2015–2017); Arena Ruse (2018); Monbat Arena (2018–2019)
- Location: Lipnik Blvd. 3; 7000 Ruse; Bulgaria
- Coordinates: 43°50′49″N 25°57′43″E
- Owner: 51% National government 49% Ruse Municipality
- Capacity: 5,100 (Sports); 6,300 (Concerts)
- Type: Arena
- Surface: Versatile

Construction
- Groundbreaking: 1976
- Built: 1976–2015
- Opened: 23 July 2015
- Cost: BGN 55 million (approx. €28 million)
- Architect: Tanko Serafimov
- Main contractor: Project Ruse JSC

Website
- arenamonbat.com

Arena Ruse (Bulgarian: Арена Русе) is an indoor arena located in Ruse, Bulgaria. It is one of the most modern venues in Southeastern Europe with a seating capacity of 5,100 spectators. Positioned in a convenient location beside the city stadium, the arena is within walking distance of the city center and only 1.5 km away from the Ruse Central railway station. An underground parking facility for 150 vehicles is available. There are plans for the construction of a shopping mall and a five-star hotel near the arena in the future.

The arena has been known by multiple names. It was first called Bulstrad Arena after insurance company Bulstrad bought the naming rights for the venue for three years. When the contract expired it was known simply as Arena Ruse. Automotive battery manufacturer Monbat AD purchased the naming rights in July 2018. The venue was renamed once again after a new three-year sponsorship agreement was signed with the OZK Insurance company.

== History ==
Projects for the sports hall were first established in 1972 and construction commenced four years later. Work was suspended on numerous occasions throughout the 80s and the end of the socialist period completely terminated all efforts to finish the indoor arena.

Works were unfrozen in 2007 when Ruse Municipality signed a contract for the completion of the sports hall with a private investor. The Bobokovi brothers, well known for their industrial businesses in the country were the private investor. They planned to build a grand shopping mall, as well as a five-star hotel in the area near the sports complex. Construction proceeded rapidly and virtually all ground works and the concrete base of the building were completed. A second, shorter period of inactivity began in 2010 and lasted three years.

Ruse Municipality agreed to purchase the multiple-floor underground parking of the sports hall in 2013 and financed construction with BGN 11 million provided by the national budget. Finishing works to the arena continued for nearly two years. After numerous postponements, the mayor of the city announced an opening date of July 23, 2015 with a concert by renowned Bulgarian singer Lili Ivanova.

Arena Ruse officially opened on July 23, 2015, in the presence of Bulgarian Prime Minister Boyko Borissov and numerous government ministers. The majority stake of the private investor in the sports arena was acquired for BGN 20 million by the Bulgarian government at the end of 2018.

== Sports ==
Arena Ruse hosted three games from Group F of the EuroBasket Women 2017 qualification. The most well-attended of these was played between the national teams of Bulgaria and Greece on November 25, 2015, with around 2,000 people present. The venue was also a host of the World Volleyball Grand Prix, where the national team of Bulgaria played against Kazakhstan, South Korea and Germany. The 2018 FIVB Volleyball World Championship took place in the arena between 12 and 18 September 2018.

After a temporary pause in sporting events during the coronavirus pandemic, the 2021 Women's European Volleyball Golden League tournament took place in the arena in June 2021.

== Other events ==
Significant events have included Michael Flatley's Lord of the Dance, as well as British hard rock bands Nazareth and Uriah Heep. World DanceSport Federation's International Open took place in Ruse, Bulgaria on November 21, 2015. Later in the year Arena Ruse hosted a show by Sukhishvili Georgian National Ballet, and Goran Bregović nearly sold-out a concert with over 5,000 attendees. World-renowned pianist Richard Clayderman performed in front of more than 2,500 people at the venue at an event on July 7, 2016. Russian pop singer of Bulgarian origin Philipp Kirkorov performed in Ruse on his Bulgaria tour in September 2017, as well as in June 2019. The English-American rock band Foreigner presented their best and most famous songs in a concert in front of over 3,500 people in the arena on May 8, 2018.

== See also ==
- List of indoor arenas in Bulgaria
