= Tanko Serafimov =

Bulgarian architect

Tanko Serafimov (Bulgarian: Танко Серафимов) (6 January 1943 – 25 December 2013) was a Bulgarian architect.

Senior Architect, Director and Partner at Atelier Serafimov Architects. Graduated from the University of Architecture, Civil Engineering and Geodesy (UACEG), Sofia in 1968. Member of the Bulgarian Union of Architects. Member of Chamber of Architects in Bulgaria. Member of Expert Council of Architecture in Direction of Architecture and Urbanization, Sofia Municipality

Professor in Architecture, Social buildings of the University of Architecture, Civil Engineering and Geodesy (UACEG) for more than 40 years. More than 40 years of Architecture practice in Bulgaria and abroad. Chairman of the Bulgarian Union of Architects for two mandates- 1998–2004.

Serafimov is the chief architect of the Arena Ruse sports venue in Ruse, Bulgaria.

On 25 December 2013, he suddenly died. During his professional work of over 40 years he marked the Bulgarian architecture with emblematic buildings for the country, as well he has mentored and educated hundreds. of architects, most of them nowadays among the best professionals in the industry. As а public figure, he was always seen as a respected strong character, with high morality and sincere personality.
