= Tasos Kampouris Kanithou Indoor Hall =

Chalkida Indoor Hall
- Interactive map of Chalkida Indoor Hall
- Full name: Tasos Kampouris Kanithou Indoor Hall
- Location: Kanithou, Chalcis, Greece
- Coordinates: 38.4700°N 23.5750°E
- Capacity: 1,620
- Surface: Parquet

Construction
- Opened: 1996

Tenant
- AGEH Gymnastikos

Tasos Kampouris Kanithou Indoor Hall, or Chalkida Indoor Hall (alternate spellings: Kabouris, Halkida; Greek: Κλειστό Γυμναστήριο Κανήθου «Τάσος Καμπούρης»), is a multi-purpose indoor arena that is located in Kanithou, Chalcis, Greece. It is named after Tasos Kampouris, a politician from the island of Euboea. The arena is mainly used to host concerts and basketball, handball and volleyball games. The arena has 1,120 regular seats available, plus another 500 seats, which are located in the arena's amphitheater. The total regular seating capacity of the arena for sporting events is 1,620 people.

== History ==
Tasos Kampouris Kanithou Indoor Hall has been used as the home arena of the Greek men's professional basketball clubs AGEH Gymnastikos and Ikaros Kallitheas. The men's professional basketball club Kymis, also used the arena to host its home games, when it played in the top-tier level Greek Basket League. The arena has also been used to host some of the EuroLeague Women home games of the Olympiacos Women's basketball team.

The arena hosted the 2002 World Wrestling Championships for Women, the 2003 HEBA Greek All-Star Game, and the 2016 FIBA Under-20 European Championship Division B. The arena was also used as a host venue by the senior Greek women's national basketball team, during the EuroBasket Women 2017 qualification, and the EuroBasket Women 2019 qualification.

== Major events hosted ==
- 2002 World Wrestling Championships for Women
- 2003 HEBA Greek All-Star Game
- 2016 FIBA Under-20 European Championship Division B
- EuroBasket Women 2017 qualification: Greece Women - one home game.
- EuroBasket Women 2019 qualification: Greece Women - two home games.
