= Lili Ivanova =

Lili Ivanova Лили Иванова
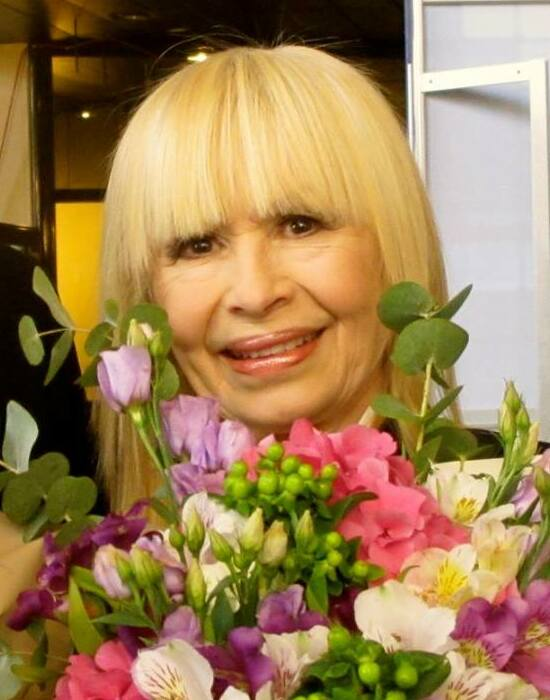
- Ivanova in 2017

Background information
- Born: Lilyana Ivanova Petrova; April 24, 1939 (age 87); Kubrat, Bulgaria
- Genres: Pop
- Occupation: Singer
- Years active: 1961–present

Lilyana Ivanova Petrova (Bulgarian: Лиляна Иванова Петрова, born April 24, 1939 in Kubrat), known professionally as Lili Ivanova (Bulgarian: Лили Иванова) is a Bulgarian singer. In tribute to her contribution to the culture of the country, she is often referred to as the "Prima of Bulgarian popular music". Since 1961 she has been continuously performing at concerts, recording songs and albums, making media appearances, participating in television programs, and filming music videos. In 2023 she was awarded with a special award by BG Radio for being "The greatest Bulgarian pop singer of all times".

== Biography ==
Lili Ivanova was born in the small town of Kubrat. She graduated from the nursing school in Varna and worked as a nurse for a very short time. She stated in an interview that she has Romanian roots on her maternal side. Her career as a singer begins in the early 1960s. She achieved recognition in 1963 as a singer with the variété show at Ambassador Hotel and the Constantin Tanase Music Hall Theatre in Bucharest, Romania. The local audience adored the rising star and the local television broadcast 4 live shows. Her first album "Amore Twist" was recorded in the same year. Her second album "Sea of Youth" was recorded in Bulgaria in 1967 and contains 11 songs. Her third album was recorded in Moscow in 1968 [Поет Лили Иванова (Lili Ivanova singing), Melodia, 1968]. Ivanova's album "Camino" was recorded by the Bulgarian Balkanton in 1968. The singer is still performing the Camino song, as it allows for the full broad spectrum of her voice.

Ivanova won her first prize "Golden Key" in 1966 in Bratislava, Czechoslovakia. In the years that follow she receives over 10 international awards and numerous local recognitions. In 1997, the International Women association nominated Ivanova as one of the most famous women of the 20th century. In 1999 Ivanova was awarded the highest Bulgarian State Award, "Stara Planina" medal, for her contribution to the Bulgarian pop music.

During 1981–1987 Ivanova lived and performed primarily in Germany. During these years she recorded several albums: "Warning" and the German "Kein Film War Schoner“ in 1981, "A Cricket" in 1982, the duo with Asen Gargov "The Heart Chose You" in 1983. The double album "I Want You" came out in 1984, followed by "Lili 86" in 1986 and "A big Wedding" in 1989.

During the turbulent 1990s Ivanova managed to sustain her career. She recorded 3 albums – "Gambling" in 1993, "Are you Ready for Love" in 1995 and "Private Matter" in 1998.

In 2000, she scored the biggest hit of her career – the song "Winds". In the years to come Ivanova performs in the biggest concert and events hall in Bulgaria, at the National Palace of Culture. On January 9, 2009, she achieves the highest honour for every singer – to perform at Olympia Hall in Paris. The singer herself continues to prove that she is capable of mastering different musical styles. She has formed several own bands during her long singing career occasionally changing her style.

== Artistry ==
=== Music style and voice ===
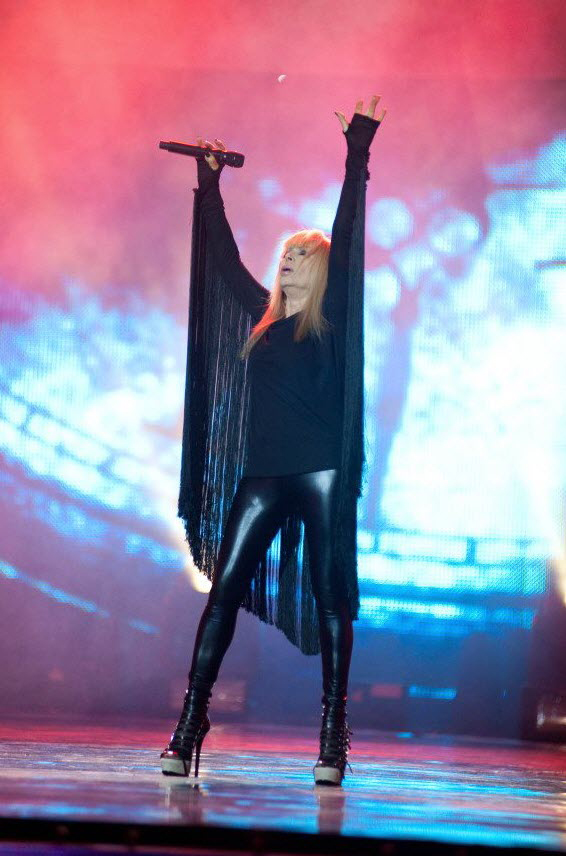
Ivanova in 2012

Ivanova started her career singing popular Italian, French and Russian hits. The singer's music style is distinctive, having strong meaningful lyrics and memorable tunes. Her music from the 1960s and 1970s was marked by complex and rich orchestrations, dramatic transitions between quiet and loud moments, often played with a brass band, string orchestra and electric guitars, with accents of piano or Hammond organ, backing vocals (sometimes choral) and a reverberation to the voice of the performer. Subsequently, with the style going out of fashion, the singer began performing music composed with electronic musical instruments. Since 2000 Ivanova has been accompanied at her live performances by several musicians – mainly pianist, violinist, guitarist and a saxophonist. The singer has repeatedly stated the importance of the songs' lyrics and the message they convey to the public. Throughout her career she has shown interest in experimenting with new sounds and has expanded her repertoire with compositions in rock, soul, rhythm and blues, Balkan ethno and jazz.

=== Discography ===
Ivanova has recorded and released 35 albums and 29 singles altogether in Bulgaria, USSR, Romania, Turkey, Germany, Spain and other countries. There aren't exact statistics on the number of sold copies of her albums. According to Alexander Yosifov, ex-director of Balkanton from 1968 to 1986, Ivanova's albums in store for the Soviet Union always reached a circulation of over 1 million. The Italian Magazine L'Europeo stated that she has sold more than 10 million copies in the USSR. However, due to the Socialist system in Bulgaria, she has never received any income from the sales of the records, beside a monthly salary equal for all famous singers at that time.

=== Concert performances and tours ===
Ivanova has had over 11,000 concerts and many tours abroad, mainly in the former USSR (and Russia in the 1990s). She has also performed in Germany, Cuba, Japan, Turkey, the Czech Republic, Yugoslavia, Hungary, Poland, Greece, Portugal, Brazil, etc. as well as several tours in the US and Canada singing for Bulgarian immigrants there.

The "Prima of Bulgarian popular music" is the first singer from the Eastern Bloc with a concert in the renowned music hall Olympia, Paris. She is also the first Bulgarian performer with a concert in the newly built Armeets Arena in Sofia, gathering 15,000 people (the venue normally can hold up to 14,000) on November 22, 2012. Lili Ivanova became the first person to perform in the brand new Bulstrad Arena sports hall in Ruse, Bulgaria with a concert on July 23, 2015. On March 31, 2026, she appeared as the featured artist in the gala concert Symphony of Time, marking the 45th anniversary of the National Palace of Culture in Sofia; the event brought together Ivanova and the Sofia Philharmonic Orchestra under the baton of Nayden Todorov.

=== Awards, nominations and honours ===
- 1966 – Slovakia – Bratislava – First prize for performance of the song "Adagio", Festival "Golden Key"
- 1967 – Poland – Warsaw – First Prize, Estrada music festival
- 1968 – Spain – Barcelona – First award for performance of the song " Shall I believe" /"Да вярвам ли"/, Estrada music festival
- 1969 – France – Cannes – "Golden Plate" (awarded for selling over 1 million albums in a year), "Trophy MIDEM" – International Festival of Vinyl Records and Music Books."
- 1970 – Brazil – Rio de Janeiro – Third Prize, Pop Song Festival. The festival took place at the stadium "Mara Kazinyo" with capacity of 30,000 people. A European singer was a precedent to win the prize.
- 1970 – Greece – Athens – "Golden Plate" Festival pop song, Olimpiada de Musica Pop
- 1973 – Japan – Tokyo – Third prize for performing the song "Панаири" of Toncho Rusev, Yamaha World Popular Song Festival. The festival was held in Imperial Garden Theater, 609 songs from 35 countries were performed. 31 participants from 15 countries were admitted to the final.
- 1973 – France – Paris – First award "Grand Prix" for performing the song "Стъпки" by Toncho Rusev, Pop Music Festival
- 1974 – Bulgaria – Sunny Beach – First award, Golden Orpheus
- 1982 – Bulgaria – Sunny Beach – First award, Golden Orpheus
- "Melody of the Year" – Lili Ivanova won awards in 1968, 1970, 1974 and 1977
- 1996 – Bulgaria – Sunny Beach – "Golden Orpheus" prize for a Lifetime Achievement
- 1999 – Bulgaria – "Stara Planina" Honour, rewarded by the President of Bulgaria in recognition of Lili Ivanova and her achievements for Bulgarian culture and popular music.
- 2006 – A star on the Bulgarian Walk of Fame

Ivanova was awarded with a golden vinyl plate from Balkanton for selling 2 million albums for a year (there are only 5 such golden plates in Bulgaria). She returned it back publicly in an act of a protest after Balkanton lowered the criteria for getting such a recognition in 1990.
