= Claudia Pop =

Romanian singer and opera stage director

Claudia Pop (born 10 July 1968) is a Romanian soprano, opera stage director, and Senior Lecturer at Transylvania University in Braşov.

In 2009, she was a soloist in a staging of St Matthew Passion by J. S. Bach with the George Enescu Bucharest Philharmonic Orchestra. In 2010, she was a soloist at the International Festival of Lyrical Art. Also in 2010, in honor of Papa Giovanni Paolo II, she was the soloist interpreting the premiere of the requiem "Sei grande Karol" by P. Carlo Colafranceschi, accompanied by the orchestration of Ezio Monti with the Rome Philharmonic Orchestra. She was also the soloist in various editions of the Brasov Musica Coronensis Festival, interpreting with the Brasov Philharmonic Orchestra the Requiem by W. A. Mozart, pieces by Gabriel Fauré, the "Marea Missa in re minor" by Anton Bruckner, the St Matthew Passion oratorio by J. S. Bach, among others.

== Musical training ==
Born in Brasov, Transylvania, Pop graduated with a mechanical engineering degree at Transilvania University of Brașov (1986–1991). She studied canto with Georgeta Stoleriu at the Music Academy in Bucharest (1991–1996) and with Arta Florescu (1995–1998). She graduated with qualifications for opera stage directorship (1993–1998) and then with a Ph. Dottor in Stylistic of Music degree (1999–2003) from the National University of Music Bucharest.

== Work ==
- 1996–1998 – soloist at Opera Brașov, Romania
- 1998–1999 – opera stage director at Opera Constanta and the E. Teodorini Musical Theater Galati, Romania
- 2000–2012 – university assistant, lecturer and senior lecturer at Transylvania University, Brasov, Romania

=== Recordings ===
CD- EDC 916 "Chemin d'amour" Poulenc, Debussy, Ravel, Fauré (Electrecord Romania, 2009).

=== Repertoire ===
- Die Zauberflöte by W. A.Mozart
- Le nozze di Figaro by W. A. Mozart
- Suor Angelica by G. Puccini
- La Bohème by G. Puccini
- Die Fledermaus by J. Strauss
- Wiener Blut by J. Strauss
- St Matthew Passion, St John Passion by J. S. Bach
- Magnificat by J. S. Bach
- Cantata No. 11 by J. S. Bach
- Die sieben Worte Jesu Christi am Kreuz by H. Schütz
- Dixit Dominus by G. F. Handel
- Messiah by G. F. Handel
- Die Schöpfung by J. Haydn
- Requiem by W. A. Mozart, Fauré
- Mass in D minor by A. Bruckner
- Petite Messe Solennelle by G. Rossini
- Psalm 42 by F. Mendelssohn
- Peer Gynt by E. Grieg
- Messe in A by G. Fauré
