= Kubrat Municipality =

Kubrat Municipality Община Кубрат
- Municipality
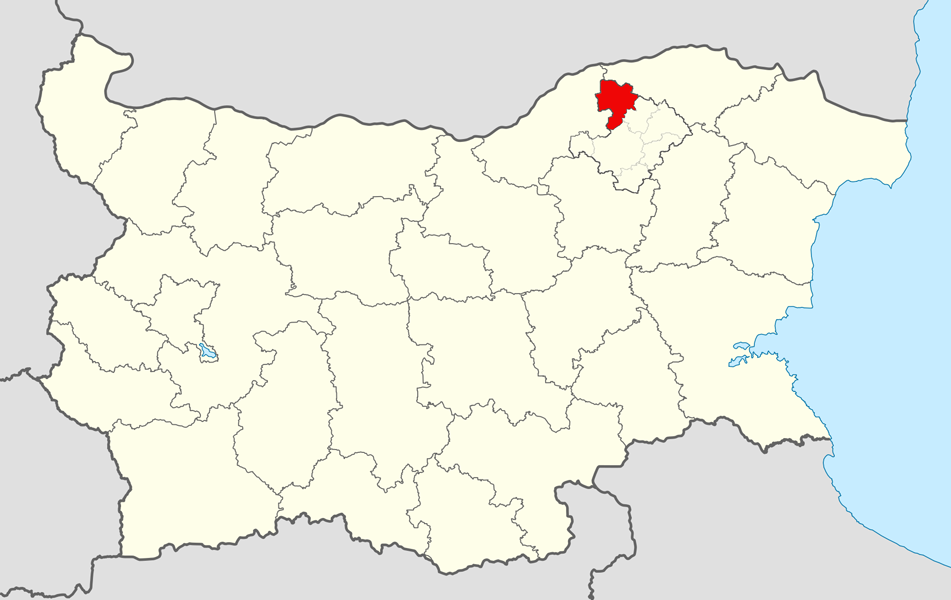
- Kubrat Municipality within Bulgaria and Razgrad Province.
- Coordinates: 43°50′N 26°27′E
- Country: Bulgaria
- Province (Oblast): Razgrad
- Admin. centre (Obshtinski tsentar): Kubrat

Area
  - Total: 439.93 km^{2} (169.86 sq mi)

Population (December 2009)
  - Total: 20,198
  - Density: 45.912/km^{2} (118.91/sq mi)
- Time zone: UTC+2 (EET)
  - Summer (DST): UTC+3 (EEST)

Kubrat Municipality (Bulgarian: Община Кубрат) is a municipality (obshtina) in Razgrad Province, Northeastern Bulgaria, located in the Danubian Plain about 10 km south of Danube river. It is named after its administrative centre - the town of Kubrat.

The municipality embraces a territory of 462 km^{2} (178 sq mi) with a population of 20,198 inhabitants, as of December 2009.

== Settlements ==
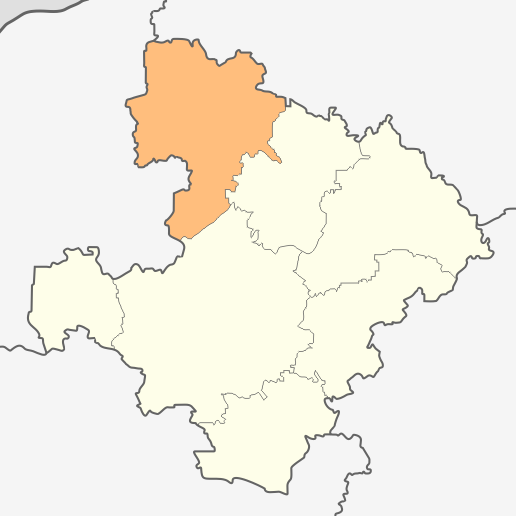
Kubrat Municipality within Razgrad Province

Kubrat Municipality includes the following 17 places (towns are shown in bold):

Town/Village	Cyrillic	Population (December 2009)
**Kubrat**	**Кубрат**	8,118
Belovets	Беловец	1,993
Bisertsi	Бисерци	1,249
Bozhurovo	Божурово	439
Gorichevo	Горичево	438
Kamenovo	Каменово	454
Medovene	Медовене	369
Madrevo	Мъдрево	926
Ravno	Равно	719
Savin	Савин	609
Sevar	Севар	1,823
Seslav	Сеслав	864
Terter	Тертер	258
Tochilari	Точилари	374
Yuper	Юпер	548
Zadruga	Задруга	452
Zvanartsi	Звънарци	565
Total		20,198

== Demography ==
The following table shows the change of the population during the last four decades. Since 1992 Kubrat Municipality has comprised the former municipality of Yuper and the numbers in the table reflect this unification.

Kubrat Municipality
**Year**	1975	1985	1992	**2001**	2005	2007	2009	**2011**
**Population**	26,157	25,945	26,304	24,124	21,314	20,795	20,198	...
Sources: Census 2001, Census 2011, „pop-stat.mashke.org“,

== See also ==
- Provinces of Bulgaria
- Municipalities of Bulgaria
- List of cities and towns in Bulgaria
