= Karen Twehues =

Swiss basketball player

Personal information
- Born: December 16, 1983 (age 42) Minusio, Switzerland
- Listed height: 1.81 m (5 ft 11 in)
- Position: Shooting guard

Career history
- 2007–2008: Juvenilia R. Emilia
- 2008–2011: Geas Basket
- 2011–2012: Basket Alcamo
- 2012–2013: Hélios Basket
- 2013–2014: Bellinzona
- 2014–present: Aarau

Karen Twehues (born 16 December 1983 in Minusio, Switzerland) is a Swiss female basketball player who plays as Shooting guard.
