= Sandra Piršić =

Slovenian basketball player

No. 11 – Gernika
- Position: Center

Personal information
- Born: October 11, 1984 (age 42) Kranj, SFR Yugoslavia
- Listed height: 1.97 m (6 ft 6 in)

Career information
- WNBA draft: 2006: undrafted

Career history
- 2004–2006: Ježica
- 2006–2007: Barcelona
- 2007–2008: La Seu d’Urgell
- 2008–2011: Ibiza
- 2012: Rivas Ecópolis
- 2012–2013: ESB Villeneuve-d'Ascq
- 2013–2016: CD Zamarat
- 2016–present: Gernika

Sandra Piršić (born October 11, 1984) is a Slovenian female basketball player.
