= 2000 FIBA Europe Under-20 Championship for Women =

2000 FIBA U20 Women's European Championship
1st FIBA Under-20 Women's European Basketball Championship

Tournament details
- Host country: Slovakia
- Dates: 28 July – 6 August 2000
- Teams: 12 (from 1 federation)
- Venue: (in 3 host cities)

Final positions
- Champions: Russia (1st title)

Tournament statistics
- Top scorer: (Slovakia) Žirková (23.2)
- Top rebounds: (Latvia) Meldere (10.0)
- Top assists: (Germany) Comteße (4.2)
- PPG (Team): Russia (87.1)
- RPG (Team): Latvia (39.1)
- APG (Team): Hungary (12.8)

Official website
- fibaeurope.com

The 2000 FIBA Europe Under-20 Championship for Women was the first edition of the FIBA Europe Under-20 Championship for Women. 12 teams featured the competition, held in Bardejov, Lučenec and Ružomberok, in Slovakia, from 28 July to 6 August. The team representing Russia won their first title.

== Qualification ==
Twenty-four national teams entered the qualifying round. They were allocated in five groups. The first two teams of each groups qualified for the tournament, where they joined Spain and Slovakia (qualified as host).

Group A

Team	Pld	W	L	PF	PA	PD	Pts
Germany	3	2	1	214	201	+13	5
Turkey	3	2	1	180	171	+9	5
Lithuania	3	1	2	186	187	−1	4
Bulgaria	3	1	2	211	232	−21	4

Group B

Team	Pld	W	L	PF	PA	PD	Pts
Croatia	4	4	0	237	182	+55	8
Hungary	4	3	1	291	183	+108	7
Ukraine	4	2	2	227	203	+24	6
Portugal	4	1	3	228	207	+21	5
Luxembourg	4	0	4	139	347	−208	4

Group C

Team	Pld	W	L	PF	PA	PD	Pts
Latvia	4	3	1	245	197	+48	7
Czech Republic	4	3	1	270	210	+60	7
Slovenia	4	3	1	238	237	+1	7
Israel	4	1	3	225	288	−63	5
Greece	4	0	4	193	239	−46	4

Group D

Team	Pld	W	L	PF	PA	PD	Pts
Russia	3	3	0	192	129	+63	6
Romania	3	2	1	188	172	+16	5
France	3	1	2	169	196	−27	4
Belarus	3	0	3	154	206	−52	3

Group E

Team	Pld	W	L	PF	PA	PD	Pts
Italy	5	5	0	351	242	+109	10
Poland	5	3	2	311	305	+6	8
Sweden	5	2	3	315	316	−1	7
Belgium	5	2	3	288	308	−20	7
Finland	5	2	3	271	305	−34	7
Ireland	5	1	4	280	340	−60	6

=== Qualified teams ===
- Croatia
- Czech Republic
- Germany
- Hungary
- Italy
- Latvia
- Poland
- Romania
- Russia
- Slovakia
- Spain
- Turkey

== Preliminary round ==
The twelve teams were allocated in two groups of six teams each.

Team advanced to Quarterfinals
Team competed in 9th-12th playoffs

=== Group A ===
Team	Pld	W	L	PF	PA	Pts
Russia	5	5	0	426	261	10
Slovakia	5	4	1	303	295	9
Romania	5	3	2	294	356	8
Turkey	5	1	4	304	330	6
Italy	5	1	4	312	348	6
Poland	5	1	4	303	352	6

=== Group B ===
Team	Pld	W	L	PF	PA	Pts
Spain	5	5	0	365	310	10
Hungary	5	4	1	303	295	9
Czech Republic	5	2	3	347	371	8
Croatia	5	2	3	323	323	7
Latvia	5	1	4	355	372	6
Germany	5	1	4	327	349	5

== Knockout stage ==
=== 9th–12th playoffs ===
Playoffs
Italy	77
Germany	83
Latvia	70
Poland	75

Ninth place
Germany	53
Poland	72
Eleventh place
Italy	80
Latvia	60

=== Championship ===
Quarterfinals
Hungary	51
Romania	59
Russia	98
Croatia	61
Slovakia	67
Czech Republic	75
Turkey	63
Spain	59

Semifinals
Romania	56
Russia	89
Czech Republic	56
Turkey	50

Final
Russia	84
Czech Republic	57
Third place
Romania	58
Turkey	55

==== 5th–8th playoffs ====
Playoffs
Hungary	47
Croatia	59
Slovakia	62
Spain	74

Fifth place
Croatia	55
Spain	70
Seventh place
Hungary	85
Slovakia	64

2000 FIBA Europe U-20
Championship for Women

Russia
First title

== Final standings ==
Rank	Team	Record
Gold medal	Russia	8-0
Silver medal	Czech Republic	4-4
Bronze medal	Romania	5-3
4th	Turkey	2-6
5th	Spain	7-1
6th	Croatia	3-5
7th	Hungary	5-3
8th	Slovakia	4-4
9th	Poland	3-4
10th	Germany	2-5
11th	Italy	2-5
12th	Latvia	1-6
