= 2022 FIBA U20 Women's European Championship =

International basketball competition

Tournament details
- Host country: Hungary
- City: Sopron
- Dates: 8–16 July 2022
- Teams: 16 (from 1 confederation)
- Venues: 2 (in 1 host city)

Final positions
- Champions: Spain (9th title)
- Runners-up: Czech Republic
- Third place: Italy

Tournament statistics
- MVP: (Spain) Claudia Contell
- Top scorer: (Poland) Szymkiewicz (18.4)
- Top rebounds: (Finland) Sandvik (8.7)
- Top assists: (France) Astier (7.2)
- PPG (Team): Spain (73.6)
- RPG (Team): Czech Republic (47.4)
- APG (Team): Hungary (19.6)

Official website
- www.fiba.basketball

The 2022 FIBA U20 Women's European Championship was the 19th edition of the Women's European basketball championship for national under-20 teams. It was played from 8 to 16 July 2022 in Sopron, Hungary. Spain women's national under-20 basketball team won the tournament and became the European champions for the ninth time.

== Participating teams ==
After the 2022 Russian invasion of Ukraine, Russia were expelled from the competition. They were replaced by Portugal, 14th in the 2019 Division A tournament.

- Belgium
- Bulgaria ▲ (Winners, 2019 FIBA U20 Women's European Championship Division B)
- Czech Republic
- Finland ▲ (Runners-up, 2019 FIBA U20 Women's European Championship Division B)
- France
- Hungary
- Ireland ▲ (Third place, 2019 FIBA U20 Women's European Championship Division B)
- Italy
- Latvia
- Lithuania
- Netherlands
- Poland
- Portugal
- ~~Russia~~
- Serbia
- Spain
- Sweden

== First round ==
The draw of the first round was held on 15 February 2022 in Freising, Germany.

In the first round, the teams were drawn into four groups of four. All teams advance to the playoffs.

=== Group A ===
Pos	Team	Pld	W	L	PF	PA	PD	Pts
1	Czech Republic	3	3	0	200	152	+48	6
2	Hungary (H)	3	2	1	211	167	+44	5
3	France	3	1	2	190	188	+2	4
4	Netherlands	3	0	3	137	231	−94	3

Source: FIBA
(H) Hosts

8 July 2022

Boxscore

Hungary	50–63	Czech Republic

Aréna Sopron

8 July 2022

Boxscore

France	72–49	Netherlands

Aréna Sopron II

9 July 2022

Boxscore

Netherlands	40–81	Hungary

Aréna Sopron

9 July 2022

Boxscore

Czech Republic	59–54	France

Aréna Sopron II

10 July 2022

Boxscore

France	64–80	Hungary

Aréna Sopron

10 July 2022

Boxscore

Czech Republic	78–48	Netherlands

Aréna Sopron

=== Group B ===
Pos	Team	Pld	W	L	PF	PA	PD	Pts
1	Italy	3	3	0	196	120	+76	6
2	Sweden	3	2	1	199	178	+21	5
3	Finland	3	1	2	160	198	−38	4
4	Belgium	3	0	3	156	215	−59	3

Source: FIBA

8 July 2022

Boxscore

Belgium	60–67	Finland

Aréna Sopron

8 July 2022

Boxscore

Italy	62–47	Sweden

Aréna Sopron

9 July 2022

Boxscore

Sweden	81–61	Belgium

Aréna Sopron II

9 July 2022

Boxscore

Finland	38–67	Italy

Aréna Sopron

10 July 2022

Boxscore

Finland	55–71	Sweden

Aréna Sopron II

10 July 2022

Boxscore

Italy	67–35	Belgium

Aréna Sopron II

=== Group C ===
Pos	Team	Pld	W	L	PF	PA	PD	Pts
1	Spain	3	3	0	255	134	+121	6
2	Poland	3	2	1	223	186	+37	5
3	Lithuania	3	1	2	146	198	−52	4
4	Bulgaria	3	0	3	154	260	−106	3

Source: FIBA

8 July 2022

Boxscore

Spain	80–40	Lithuania

Aréna Sopron

8 July 2022

Boxscore

Poland	90–75	Bulgaria

Aréna Sopron II

9 July 2022

Boxscore

Lithuania	34–66	Poland

Aréna Sopron

9 July 2022

Boxscore

Bulgaria	27–98	Spain

Aréna Sopron

10 July 2022

Boxscore

Spain	77–67	Poland

Aréna Sopron II

10 July 2022

Boxscore

Bulgaria	52–72	Lithuania

Aréna Sopron II

=== Group D ===
Pos	Team	Pld	W	L	PF	PA	PD	Pts
1	Portugal	3	2	1	192	147	+45	5
2	Serbia	3	2	1	200	191	+9	5
3	Latvia	3	2	1	195	183	+12	5
4	Ireland	3	0	3	168	234	−66	3

Source: FIBA

8 July 2022

Boxscore

Portugal	68–47	Ireland

Aréna Sopron II

8 July 2022

Boxscore

Serbia	64–65	Latvia

Aréna Sopron II

9 July 2022

Boxscore

Latvia	45–74	Portugal

Aréna Sopron II

9 July 2022

Boxscore

Ireland	76–81	Serbia

Aréna Sopron II

10 July 2022

Boxscore

Serbia	55–50	Portugal

Aréna Sopron

10 July 2022

Boxscore

Ireland	45–85	Latvia

Aréna Sopron

== Playoff brackets ==
=== Main bracket ===
Round of 16
12 July
Czech Republic	65
Belgium	42
12 July
Poland	70
Latvia	54
12 July
Sweden	57
France	73
12 July
Portugal	90
Bulgaria	54
12 July
Italy	76
Netherlands	36
12 July
Serbia	71
Lithuania	41
12 July
Hungary	84
Finland	74
12 July
Spain	87
Ireland	30

Quarterfinals
13 July
Czech Republic	64
Poland	43
13 July
France	77
Portugal	35
13 July
Italy	72
Serbia	46
13 July
Hungary	56
Spain	70

Semifinals
15 July
Czech Republic	65
France	63
15 July
Italy	40
Spain	56

Final
16 July
Czech Republic	42
Spain	47
3rd place match
16 July
France	48
Italy	64

=== 5th place bracket ===
5th–8th place semifinals
15 July
Poland	51
Portugal	58
15 July
Serbia	66
Hungary	82

5th place match
16 July
Portugal	50
Hungary	75
7th place match
16 July
Poland	70
Serbia	57

=== 9th place bracket ===
9th–16th place quarterfinals
13 July
Belgium	66
Latvia	68
13 July
Sweden	94
Bulgaria	71
13 July
Netherlands	56
Lithuania	59
13 July
Finland	73
Ireland	59

9th–12th place semifinals
15 July
Latvia	78
Sweden	58
15 July
Lithuania	65
Finland	79

9th place match
16 July
Latvia	64
Finland	70
11th place match
16 July
Sweden	71
Lithuania	44

=== 13th place bracket ===
13th–16th place semifinals
15 July
Belgium	70
Bulgaria	56
15 July
Netherlands	58
Ireland	50

13th place match
16 July
Belgium	67
Netherlands	58
15th place match
16 July
Bulgaria	70
Ireland	53

== Playoff results ==
=== Round of 16 ===
12 July 2022
13:00

Boxscore

Poland	70–54	Latvia

Aréna Sopron II

12 July 2022
13:30

Boxscore

Serbia	71–41	Lithuania

Aréna Sopron

12 July 2022
15:15

Boxscore

Czech Republic	65–42	Belgium

Aréna Sopron II

12 July 2022
15:45

Boxscore

Italy	76–36	Netherlands

Aréna Sopron

12 July 2022
17:30

Boxscore

Sweden	57–73	France

Aréna Sopron II

12 July 2022
18:00

Boxscore

Hungary	84–74	Finland

Aréna Sopron

12 July 2022
19:45

Boxscore

Portugal	90–54	Bulgaria

Aréna Sopron II

12 July 2022
20:15

Boxscore

Spain	87–30	Ireland

Aréna Sopron

=== 9th–16th place quarterfinals ===
13 July 2022
13:00

Boxscore

Belgium	66–68	Latvia

Aréna Sopron II

13 July 2022
15:15

Boxscore

Netherlands	56–59	Lithuania

Aréna Sopron II

13 July 2022
17:30

Boxscore

Sweden	94–71	Bulgaria

Aréna Sopron II

13 July 2022
19:45

Boxscore

Finland	73–59	Ireland

Aréna Sopron II

=== 13th–16th place semifinals ===
15 July 2022
13:00

Boxscore

Belgium	70–56	Bulgaria

Aréna Sopron II

15 July 2022
15:15

Boxscore

Ireland	50–58	Netherlands

Aréna Sopron II

=== 15th place match ===
16 July 2022
11:00

Boxscore

Bulgaria	70–53	Ireland

Aréna Sopron II

=== 13th place match ===
16 July 2022
15:45

Boxscore

Belgium	67–58	Netherlands

Aréna Sopron

=== 9th–12th place semifinals ===
15 July 2022
17:30

Boxscore

Latvia	78–58	Sweden

Aréna Sopron II

15 July 2022
19:45

Boxscore

Finland	79–65	Lithuania

Aréna Sopron II

=== 11th place match ===
16 July 2022
15:30

Boxscore

Sweden	71–44	Lithuania

Aréna Sopron II

=== 9th place match ===
16 July 2022
17:45

Boxscore

Latvia	64–70	Finland

Aréna Sopron II

=== Championship quarterfinals ===
13 July 2022
13:30

Boxscore

Italy	72–46	Serbia

Aréna Sopron

13 July 2022
15:45

Boxscore

Czech Republic	64–43	Poland

Aréna Sopron

13 July 2022
18:00

Boxscore

Hungary	56–70	Spain

Aréna Sopron

13 July 2022
20:15

Boxscore

France	77–35	Portugal

Aréna Sopron

=== 5th–8th place semifinals ===
15 July 2022
13:30

Boxscore

Poland	51–58	Portugal

Aréna Sopron

15 July 2022
15:45

Boxscore

Hungary	82–66	Serbia

Aréna Sopron

=== 7th place match ===
16 July 2022
13:30

Boxscore

Poland	70–57	Serbia

Aréna Sopron II

=== 5th place match ===
16 July 2022
13:15

Boxscore

Portugal	50–75	Hungary

Aréna Sopron

=== Championship semifinals ===
15 July 2022
18:00

Boxscore

Spain	56–40	Italy

Aréna Sopron

15 July 2022
20:15

Boxscore

Czech Republic	65–63	France

Aréna Sopron

=== 3rd place match ===
16 July 2022
18:00

Boxscore

France	48–64	Italy

Aréna Sopron

=== Final ===
16 July 2022
20:15

Boxscore

Czech Republic	42–47	Spain

Aréna Sopron

== Final standings ==
Rank	Team	Record
Gold medal	Spain	7–0
Silver medal	Czech Republic	6–1
Bronze medal	Italy	6–1
4	France	3–4
5	Hungary	5–2
6	Portugal	4–3
7	Poland	4–3
8	Serbia	3–4
9	Finland	4–3
10	Latvia	4–3
11	Sweden	4–3
12	Lithuania	2–5
13	Belgium	2–5
14	Netherlands	1–6
15	Bulgaria	1–6
16	Ireland	0–7

Relegated to the 2023 FIBA U20 Women's European Championship Division B
