= Latvia women's national under-20 basketball team =

National under-20 women's basketball team of Latvia

Latvia
- FIBA zone: FIBA Europe
- National federation: Latvian Basketball Association

U21 World Championship
- Appearances: 1
- Medals: None

U20 EuroBasket
- Appearances: 20
- Medals: (silver) Silver: 1 (2023); (bronze) Bronze: 3 (2005, 2009, 2010)

U20 EuroBasket Division B
- Appearances: 1
- Medals: (bronze) Bronze: 1 (2013)

The Latvia women's national under-20 basketball team is a national basketball team of Latvia, administered by the Latvian Basketball Association. It represents the country in international under-20 women's basketball competitions.

== FIBA U20 Women's EuroBasket participations ==
Year	Division A	Division B
2000	12th	
2002	4th	
2005	3rd place, bronze medalist(s)	
2006	12th	
2007	12th	
2008	6th	
2009	3rd place, bronze medalist(s)	
2010	3rd place, bronze medalist(s)	
2011	12th	
2012	15th	
2013		3rd place, bronze medalist(s)

Year	Division A	Division B
2014	5th	
2015	12th	
2016	7th	
2017	8th	
2018	11th	
2019	10th	
2022	10th	
2023	2nd place, silver medalist(s)	
2024	8th	
2025	11th	

== FIBA Under-21 World Championship for Women participations ==
Year	Result
2003	8th

== See also ==
- Latvia women's national basketball team
- Latvia women's national under-19 basketball team
- Latvia men's national under-20 basketball team
