= 2024 FIBA U20 Women's EuroBasket =

International basketball competition

Tournament details
- Host country: Lithuania
- Cities: Klaipėda, Vilnius
- Dates: 6–14 July 2024
- Teams: 16 (from 1 confederation)
- Venues: 3 (in 2 host cities)

Final positions
- Champions: France (5th title)
- Runners-up: Spain
- Third place: Italy
- Fourth place: Germany

Official website
- www.fiba.basketball

The 2024 FIBA U20 Women's EuroBasket was the 21st edition of the European basketball championship for women's national under-20 teams. The tournament was played in Klaipėda and Vilnius, Lithuania, from 6 to 14 July 2024.

== Participating teams ==
- Finland
- France
- Germany ▲ (Runners-up, 2023 FIBA U20 Women's European Championship Division B)
- Hungary
- Israel
- Italy
- Latvia
- Lithuania
- Montenegro
- Poland
- Portugal
- Serbia
- Slovenia ▲ (Winners, 2023 FIBA U20 Women's European Championship Division B)
- Spain
- Sweden
- Turkey

== First round ==
The draw of the first round was held on 6 February 2024 in Freising, Germany.

In the first round, the teams were drawn into four groups of four. All teams advanced to the playoffs.

All times are local (Eastern European Summer Time – UTC+3).

=== Group A ===
Pos	Team	Pld	W	L	PF	PA	PD	Pts
1	France	3	3	0	234	159	+75	6
2	Latvia	3	2	1	195	204	−9	5
3	Slovenia	3	1	2	189	194	−5	4
4	Lithuania	3	0	3	176	237	−61	3

Source: FIBA

6 July 2024
13:00

Boxscore

France	70–49	Slovenia
Scoring by quarter: 17–13, 14–16, 16–11, 23–9
Pts: Kane, Zodia 13; Rebs: Le Seyec 9 Asts: Saulnier 8		Pts: Three players 11; Rebs: Sivka, Misjak Cujnik 6 Asts: Bartelme 6

Svyturio Arena, Klaipėda
Attendance: 50
Referees: Özlem Yalman (TUR), Karol Kowalski (FIN), Ewa Matuszewska (POL)

6 July 2024
18:00

Boxscore

Latvia	72–65	Lithuania
Scoring by quarter: 22–16, 14–18, 19–11, 17–20
Pts: Viksne 26; Rebs: Tomasicka 8 Asts: Viksne 6		Pts: Raulusaityte 19; Rebs: Sirtautaite 10; Asts: Pupkeviciute 5

Svyturio Arena, Klaipėda
Attendance: 400
Referees: Ilias Kounelles (CYP), Karolina Andersson (FIN), Ioannis Agrafiotis (GRE)

7 July 2024
13:00

Boxscore

Slovenia	60–66	Latvia
Scoring by quarter: 10–18, 18–17, 20–10, 12–21
Pts: Zeks 15; Rebs: Srot 7 Asts: Sivka 4		Pts: Sila 21; Rebs: Viksne 10; Asts: Viksne 10

Svyturio Arena, Klaipėda
Attendance: 100
Referees: Alessandro Perciavalle (ITA), Balazs Meszaros (HUN), Or Zror (ISR)

7 July 2024
18:00

Boxscore

Lithuania	53–85	France
Scoring by quarter: 17–19, 13–24, 17–18, 6–24
Pts: Aukstikalnyte, Andrunaviciute 10; Rebs: Raulusaityte, Sirtautaite 6 Asts: Sedereviciute 3		Pts: Dursus 13; Rebs: Three players 6 Asts: Saulnier, Toure 4

Svyturio Arena, Klaipėda
Attendance: 501
Referees: Carsten Straube (GER), Ivana Ivanovic (SRB), Marija Ciric (SRB)

9 July 2024
18:00

Boxscore

Slovenia	80–58	Lithuania
Scoring by quarter: 20–18, 14–7, 27–21, 19–12
Pts: Sivka 15; Rebs: Bartelme 10; Asts: Bartelme 6		Pts: Raulusaityte, Sirtautaite 13; Rebs: Sirtautaite 7 Asts: Sirtautaite 3

Svyturio Arena, Klaipėda
Attendance: 300
Referees: Carsten Straube (GER), Alessandro Perciavalle (ITA), Ewa Matuszewska (POL)

9 July 2024
20:30

Boxscore

Latvia	57–79	France
Scoring by quarter: 15–26, 16–12, 16–22, 10–19
Pts: Sila 16; Rebs: Three players 4 Asts: Viksne 6		Pts: Dursus 18; Rebs: Lokoka, Dibanzilua 8 Asts: Zemoura 4

Svyturio Arena, Klaipėda
Attendance: 45
Referees: Özlem Yalman (TUR), Ivana Ivanovic (SRB), Balazs Meszaros (HUN)

=== Group B ===
Pos	Team	Pld	W	L	PF	PA	PD	Pts
1	Spain	3	3	0	268	96	+172	6
2	Sweden	3	2	1	160	208	−48	5
3	Portugal	3	1	2	152	184	−32	4
4	Montenegro	3	0	3	112	204	−92	3

Source: FIBA

6 July 2024
15:30

Boxscore

Portugal	57–58	Sweden
Scoring by quarter: 11–18, 11–18, 13–7, 22–15
Pts: Bettencourt 10; Rebs: Peixinho Neves, Silva 5 Asts: Roseiro 6		Pts: Trygger 19; Rebs: Trygger 16; Asts: Collins 7

Svyturio Arena, Klaipėda
Attendance: 62
Referees: Ivana Ivanovic (SRB), Balazs Meszaros (HUN), Marija Ciric (SRB)

6 July 2024
20:30

Boxscore

Spain	84–19	Montenegro
Scoring by quarter: 25–2, 8–5, 26–6, 25–6
Pts: Morro 15; Rebs: Morro 8 Asts: Buenavida, Fam 6		Pts: Baosic 7 Rebs: Bigovic 6 Asts: Savkovic 2

Svyturio Arena, Klaipėda
Attendance: 52
Referees: Carsten Straube (GER), Alessandro Perciavalle (ITA), Or Zror (ISR)

7 July 2024
15:30

Boxscore

Sweden	43–100	Spain
Scoring by quarter: 9–30, 8–16, 14–26, 12–28
Pts: Collins, Enander 11; Rebs: Gross 5 Asts: Three players 2		Pts: Brito 19; Rebs: Ikponmwosa 10; Asts: Buenavida 6

Svyturio Arena, Klaipėda
Attendance: 70
Referees: Özlem Yalman (TUR), Ioannis Agrafiotis (GRE), Ewa Matuszewska (POL)

7 July 2024
20:30

Boxscore

Montenegro	42–61	Portugal
Scoring by quarter: 9–13, 11–20, 12–13, 10–15
Pts: Savkovic 15; Rebs: Vukcevic 15; Asts: Radevic 3		Pts: Djalo 16; Rebs: Silva 10; Asts: Silva 5

Svyturio Arena, Klaipėda
Attendance: 30
Referees: Ilias Kounelles (CYP), Karolina Andersson (FIN), Karol Kowalski (FIN)

9 July 2024
13:00

Boxscore

Montenegro	51–59	Sweden
Scoring by quarter: 14–11, 9–10, 17–14, 11–24
Pts: Savkovic 20; Rebs: Bigovic, Vukcevic 12; Asts: Scepanovic 3		Pts: Noyan 18; Rebs: Trygger 10; Asts: Collins 8

Svyturio Arena, Klaipėda
Attendance: 50
Referees: Karolina Andersson (FIN), Ioannis Agrafiotis (GRE), Or Zror (ISR)

9 July 2024
15:30

Boxscore

Portugal	34–84	Spain
Scoring by quarter: 6–21, 8–18, 7–28, 13–17
Pts: Dias 8 Rebs: Djalo 7 Asts: Bettencourt 5		Pts: Brito, Morro 16; Rebs: Flórez 7 Asts: Buenavida 6

Svyturio Arena, Klaipėda
Attendance: 50
Referees: Ilias Kounelles (CYP), Karol Kowalski (FIN), Marija Ciric (SRB)

=== Group C ===
Pos	Team	Pld	W	L	PF	PA	PD	Pts
1	Italy	3	3	0	228	161	+67	6
2	Turkey	3	2	1	185	183	+2	5
3	Poland	3	1	2	178	197	−19	4
4	Finland	3	0	3	159	209	−50	3

Source: FIBA

6 July 2024
15:30

Boxscore

Italy	74–50	Turkey
Scoring by quarter: 23–8, 20–15, 16–15, 15–12
Pts: M. Villa 16; Rebs: Cancelli 9 Asts: M. Villa 6		Pts: Istanbulluoglu 17; Rebs: Five players 4 Asts: Sertoglu 5

Jeep Arena, Vilnius
Attendance: 50
Referees: Radomir Vojinovic (MNE), Ritvars Helmsteins (LAT), Martin Demierre (SUI)

6 July 2024
18:00

Boxscore

Poland	64–53	Finland
Scoring by quarter: 17–15, 20–6, 16–15, 11–17
Pts: Makurat 20; Rebs: Makurat 10; Asts: Tomasik 8		Pts: Aarnisalo 27; Rebs: Syla 9 Asts: Kanerva 4

Jeep Arena, Vilnius
Attendance: 89
Referees: Sandra Sanchez Gonzalez (ESP), Anna Belousova (LAT), Sara Månsson (SWE)

7 July 2024
13:00

Boxscore

Turkey	73–52	Poland
Scoring by quarter: 9–10, 24–9, 24–6, 16–27
Pts: Istanbulluoglu 20; Rebs: Istanbulluoglu 9 Asts: Sertoglu 5		Pts: Gilmajster 15; Rebs: Adamczuk 7 Asts: Tomasik 6

Jeep Arena, Vilnius
Attendance: 45
Referees: José Pedroso (POR), Veronika Obertova (SVK), Milita Stalaucinskaite (LTU)

7 July 2024
20:30

Boxscore

Finland	49–83	Italy
Scoring by quarter: 16–26, 5–16, 13–21, 15–20
Pts: Aarnisalo 15; Rebs: Syla 7 Asts: Three players 2		Pts: M. Villa 19; Rebs: Cancelli 10; Asts: M. Villa 5

Jeep Arena, Vilnius
Attendance: 51
Referees: Chess Van Looy (BEL), Diana Lapanović (SLO), Anna Belousova (LAT)

9 July 2024
15:30

Boxscore

Turkey	62–57	Finland
Scoring by quarter: 19–14, 11–11, 10–17, 22–15
Pts: Sertoglu 29; Rebs: Kaplan 9 Asts: Sertoglu 7		Pts: Aarnisalo 18; Rebs: Aarnisalo 8 Asts: Hakkarainen, Aarnisalo 2

Jeep Arena, Vilnius
Attendance: 38
Referees: José Pedroso (POR), Sara Månsson (SWE), Laure Coanus (FRA)

9 July 2024
18:00

Boxscore

Poland	62–71	Italy
Scoring by quarter: 12–13, 17–19, 22–17, 11–22
Pts: Makurat 14; Rebs: Makurat 9 Asts: Piasecka 4		Pts: E. Villa 21; Rebs: M. Villa, Cancelli 10; Asts: M. Villa 8

Jeep Arena, Vilnius
Attendance: 82
Referees: Sandra Sanchez Gonzalez (ESP), Milita Stalaucinskaite (LTU), Martin Demierre (SUI)

=== Group D ===
Pos	Team	Pld	W	L	PF	PA	PD	Pts
1	Germany	3	3	0	224	159	+65	6
2	Hungary	3	2	1	217	223	−6	5
3	Israel	3	1	2	193	208	−15	4
4	Serbia	3	0	3	198	242	−44	3

Source: FIBA

6 July 2024
13:00

Boxscore

Hungary	78–77	Israel
Scoring by quarter: 22–19, 16–18, 21–26, 19–14
Pts: Laczko 21; Rebs: Strausz 10; Asts: Aho 5		Pts: Dahan Sujic 34; Rebs: Ettinger 7 Asts: Ettinger 6

Jeep Arena, Vilnius
Attendance: 30
Referees: Chess Van Looy (BEL), Veronika Obertova (SVK), Diana Lapanović (SLO)

6 July 2024
20:30

Boxscore

Serbia	63–83	Germany
Scoring by quarter: 20–18, 17–29, 16–10, 10–26
Pts: Avlijas 14; Rebs: Zecevic 7 Asts: Avlijas, Marojevic 3		Pts: Bühner 24; Rebs: Buhner 10; Asts: Rolf 6

Jeep Arena, Vilnius
Attendance: 57
Referees: José Pedroso (POR), Laure Coanus (FRA), Milita Stalaucinskaite (LTU)

7 July 2024
15:30

Boxscore

Germany	74–53	Hungary
Scoring by quarter: 17–11, 20–15, 19–10, 18–17
Pts: Brochlitz 23; Rebs: Rolf 12; Asts: Kreyenfeld 4		Pts: Aho 9 Rebs: Bajzath 6 Asts: Baa 3

Jeep Arena, Vilnius
Attendance: 100
Referees: Ritvars Helmsteins (LAT), Martin Demierre (SUI), Sara Månsson (SWE)

7 July 2024
18:00

Boxscore

Israel	73–63	Serbia
Scoring by quarter: 18–18, 20–14, 22–5, 13–26
Pts: Dahan Sujic 20; Rebs: Dahan Sujic 15; Asts: Singer 4		Pts: Vukovic, Marojevic 12; Rebs: Zecevic 6 Asts: Three players 3

Jeep Arena, Vilnius
Attendance: 40
Referees: Radomir Vojinovic (MNE), Sandra Sanchez Gonzalez (ESP), Laure Coanus (FRA)

9 July 2024
13:00

Boxscore

Germany	67–43	Israel
Scoring by quarter: 31–11, 12–19, 15–7, 9–6
Pts: Bühner 17; Rebs: Buhner 12; Asts: Langermann 4		Pts: Ettinger, Dahan Sujic 8 Rebs: Ettinger 6 Asts: Singer 3

Jeep Arena, Vilnius
Attendance: 59
Referees: Radomir Vojinovic (MNE), Veronika Obertova (SVK), Anna Belousova (LAT)

9 July 2024
20:30

Boxscore

Hungary	86–72	Serbia
Scoring by quarter: 31–12, 18–20, 16–15, 21–25
Pts: Baa 24; Rebs: Strausz, Bajzath 5 Asts: Gyongyosi, Bajzath 4		Pts: Jevtovic 15; Rebs: Zecevic 7 Asts: Nestorov, Vukovic 4

Jeep Arena, Vilnius
Attendance: 45
Referees: Ritvars Helmsteins (LAT), Chess Van Looy (BEL), Diana Lapanović (SLO)

== Playoff brackets ==
=== Main bracket ===
Round of 16
10 July
A1 France	81
B4 Montenegro	46
10 July
C2 Turkey	88
D3 Israel	76
10 July
B2 Sweden	54
A3 Slovenia	62
10 July
D1 Germany	90
C4 Finland	60
10 July
A2 Latvia	54
B3 Portugal	51
10 July
C1 Italy	91
D4 Serbia	63
10 July
B1 Spain	76
A4 Lithuania	40
10 July
D2 Hungary	63
C3 Poland	66

Quarterfinals
12 July
France	67
Turkey	66
12 July
Slovenia	71
Germany	76
12 July
Latvia	53
Italy	68
12 July
Spain	89
Poland	41

Semifinals
13 July
France	64
Germany	55
13 July
Italy	58
Spain	85

Final
14 July
France	83
Spain	75
3rd place match
14 July
Germany	48
Italy	70

=== 5th place bracket ===
5th–8th place semifinals
13 July
Turkey	53
Slovenia	82
13 July
Latvia	52
Poland	69

5th place match
14 July
Slovenia	74
Poland	65
7th place match
14 July
Turkey	72
Latvia	52

=== 9th place bracket ===
9th–16th place quarterfinals
12 July
Montenegro	49
Israel	70
12 July
Sweden	64
Finland	54
12 July
Portugal	76
Serbia	60
12 July
Lithuania	76
Hungary	73

9th–12th place semifinals
13 July
Israel	79
Sweden	73
13 July
Portugal	68
Lithuania	76

9th place match
14 July
Israel	73
Lithuania	55
11th place match
14 July
Sweden	53
Portugal	70

=== 13th place bracket ===
13th–16th place semifinals
13 July
Montenegro	64
Finland	51
13 July
Serbia	61
Hungary	71

13th place match
14 July
Montenegro	76
Hungary	68
15th place match
14 July
Finland	60
Serbia	67

== Playoff results ==
=== Round of 16 ===
10 July 2024
13:00

Boxscore

Sweden	54–62	Slovenia
Scoring by quarter: 21–13, 8–16, 12–14, 13–19
Pts: Barbosa 15; Rebs: Trygger 10; Asts: Collins 4		Pts: Bartelme 10; Rebs: Bartelme 13; Asts: Bartelme 5

Svyturio Arena, Klaipeda
Attendance: 60
Referees: Özlem Yalman (TUR), Ilias Kounelles (CYP), Ivana Ivanovic (SRB)

10 July 2024
13:00

Boxscore

Germany	90–60	Finland
Scoring by quarter: 23–12, 19–16, 21–19, 27–13
Pts: Bühner 19; Rebs: Rolf 11; Asts: Kreyenfeld 4		Pts: Aarnisalo 19; Rebs: Four players 4 Asts: Kanerva 3

Jeep Arena, Vilnius
Attendance: 42
Referees: Radomir Vojinovic (MNE), Milita Stalaucinskaite (LTU), Martin Demierre (SUI)

10 July 2024
15:30

Boxscore

France	81–46	Montenegro
Scoring by quarter: 18–19, 22–12, 21–8, 20–7
Pts: Cisse 12; Rebs: Zemoura, Zodia 6 Asts: Four players 4		Pts: Bulajic 22; Rebs: Vukcevic 9 Asts: Bigovic 3

Svyturio Arena, Klaipeda
Attendance: 30
Referees: Alessandro Perciavalle (ITA), Balazs Meszaros (HUN), Marija Ciric (SRB)

10 July 2024
15:30

Boxscore

Turkey	88–76	Israel
Scoring by quarter: 25–25, 16–9, 26–20, 21–22
Pts: Sertoglu 30; Rebs: Kaplan, Guven 9 Asts: Three players 4		Pts: Karsh 23; Rebs: Dahan Sujic 6 Asts: Singer 6

Jeep Arena, Vilnius
Attendance: 45
Referees: Sandra Sanchez Gonzalez (ESP), Ritvars Helmsteins (LAT), Sara Månsson (SWE)

10 July 2024
18:00

Boxscore

Spain	76–40	Lithuania
Scoring by quarter: 22–15, 26–9, 16–7, 12–9
Pts: Asensio 15; Rebs: Mata 13; Asts: Buenavida 5		Pts: Pupkeviciute 18; Rebs: Raulusaityte 8 Asts: Aukstikalnyte 3

Svyturio Arena, Klaipeda
Attendance: 205
Referees: Karolina Andersson (FIN), Karol Kowalski (FIN), Ioannis Agrafiotis (GRE)

10 July 2024
18:00

Boxscore

Hungary	63–66	Poland
Scoring by quarter: 12–16, 13–23, 11–15, 27–12
Pts: Gyongyosi 16; Rebs: Olah 6 Asts: Three players 3		Pts: Ullmann 22; Rebs: Makurat 12; Asts: Tomasik 6

Jeep Arena, Vilnius
Attendance: 50
Referees: José Pedroso (POR), Laure Coanus (FRA), Anna Belousova (LAT)

10 July 2024
20:30

Boxscore

Latvia	54–51	Portugal
Scoring by quarter: 13–13, 19–9, 15–13, 7–16
Pts: Tomasicka 27; Rebs: Liepina 10; Asts: Tomasicka 3		Pts: Djalo 17; Rebs: Silva 10; Asts: Four players 3

Svyturio Arena, Klaipeda
Attendance: 61
Referees: Carsten Straube (GER), Ewa Matuszewska (POL), Or Zror (ISR)

10 July 2024
20:30

Boxscore

Italy	91–63	Serbia
Scoring by quarter: 26–17, 18–11, 24–19, 23–16
Pts: E. Villa 32; Rebs: M. Villa, Zanardi 7 Asts: Zanardi 5		Pts: Jevtovic 13; Rebs: Milanovic 7 Asts: Nestorov 6

Jeep Arena, Vilnius
Attendance: 75
Referees: Chess Van Looy (BEL), Veronika Obertova (SVK), Diana Lapanović (SLO)

=== 9th–16th place quarterfinals ===
12 July 2024
13:00

Boxscore

Montenegro	49–70	Israel
Scoring by quarter: 20–21, 10–17, 12–16, 7–16
Pts: Savkovic 13; Rebs: Vucinic, Scepanovic 8 Asts: Savkovic, Atina Radevic 3		Pts: Singer 17; Rebs: Three players 7 Asts: Dahan Sujic 5

Jeep Arena, Vilnius
Attendance: 20
Referees: José Pedroso (POR), Balazs Meszaros (HUN), Milita Stalaucinskaite (LTU)

12 July 2024
15:30

Boxscore

Sweden	64–54	Finland
Scoring by quarter: 7–19, 20–8, 22–11, 15–16
Pts: Collins 20; Rebs: Noyan 12; Asts: Collins, Trygger 5		Pts: Aarnisalo 13; Rebs: Syla 9 Asts: Kanerva 5

Jeep Arena, Vilnius
Attendance: 25
Referees: Ritvars Helmsteins (LAT), Martin Demierre (SUI), Marija Ciric (SRB)

12 July 2024
18:00

Boxscore

Portugal	76–60	Serbia
Scoring by quarter: 15–7, 19–18, 22–15, 20–20
Pts: Bettencourt 18; Rebs: Djalo 6 Asts: Silva, Falcao 5		Pts: Dragicevic 18; Rebs: Marojevic, Milanovic 7 Asts: Dragicevic 5

Jeep Arena, Vilnius
Attendance: 25
Referees: Radomir Vojinovic (MNE), Anna Belousova (LAT), Or Zror (ISR)

12 July 2024
20:30

Boxscore

Lithuania	76–73	Hungary
Scoring by quarter: 18–22, 18–19, 18–17, 22–15
Pts: Raulusaityte 19; Rebs: Aukstikalnyte 10; Asts: Augustinaite 6		Pts: Laczko, Baa 15; Rebs: Strausz 9 Asts: Bajzath 7

Jeep Arena, Vilnius
Attendance: 110
Referees: Karolina Andersson (FIN), Karol Kowalski (FIN), Diana Lapanović (SLO)

=== 13th–16th place semifinals ===
13 July 2024
13:00

Boxscore

Montenegro	64–51	Finland
Scoring by quarter: 10–3, 14–11, 17–20, 23–17
Pts: Savkovic 16; Rebs: Bigovic 9 Asts: Vukcevic 2		Pts: Aarnisalo 17; Rebs: Syla 8 Asts: Kanerva 6

Jeep Arena, Vilnius
Attendance: 10
Referees: Chess Van Looy (BEL), Anna Belousova (LAT), Milita Stalaucinskaite (LTU)

13 July 2024
15:30

Boxscore

Serbia	61–71	Hungary
Scoring by quarter: 14–17, 16–20, 13–20, 18–14
Pts: Jevtovic 14; Rebs: Jevtovic 10; Asts: Nestorov, Vukovic 5		Pts: Olah 16; Rebs: Baa 9 Asts: Laczko, Baa 5

Jeep Arena, Vilnius
Attendance: 20
Referees: Sandra Sanchez Gonzalez (ESP), Laure Coanus (FRA), Ewa Matuszewska (POL)

=== 15th place match ===
14 July 2024
10:30

Boxscore

Finland	60–67	Serbia
Scoring by quarter: 9–16, 16–12, 16–16, 19–23
Pts: Williams 15; Rebs: Ulander, Syla 7 Asts: Hakkarainen, Kanerva 5		Pts: Dragicevic 13; Rebs: Jevtovic 12; Asts: Vukovic, Dragicevic 5

Jeep Arena, Vilnius
Attendance: 9
Referees: Chess Van Looy (BEL), Or Zror (ISR), Balazs Meszaros (HUN)

=== 13th place match ===
14 July 2024
15:30

Boxscore

Montenegro	76–68	Hungary
Scoring by quarter: 13–26, 19–22, 23–10, 21–10
Pts: Bulajic 30; Rebs: Vukcevic 12; Asts: Savkovic 5		Pts: Gyongyosi 17; Rebs: Laczko 7 Asts: Three players 3

Twinsbet Arena, Vilnius
Attendance: 25
Referees: Ritvars Helmsteins (LAT), Alessandro Perciavalle (ITA), Ioannis Agrafiotis (GRE)

=== 9th–12th place semifinals ===
13 July 2024
18:00

Boxscore

Israel	79–73	Sweden
Scoring by quarter: 20–24, 13–10, 19–16, 27–23
Pts: Dahan Sujic 23; Rebs: Ettinger, Dahan Sujic 7 Asts: Singer 6		Pts: Barbosa 16; Rebs: Trygger 9 Asts: Englund 4

Jeep Arena, Vilnius
Attendance: 32
Referees: Ivana Ivanovic (SRB), Karol Kowalski (FIN), Diana Lapanović (SLO)

13 July 2024
20:30

Boxscore

Portugal	68–76	Lithuania
Scoring by quarter: 15–20, 17–13, 21–14, 15–29
Pts: Bettencourt 20; Rebs: Silva 6 Asts: Roseiro 7		Pts: Pupkeviciute 18; Rebs: Sirtautaite 8 Asts: Three players 3

Jeep Arena, Vilnius
Attendance: 115
Referees: Karolina Andersson (FIN), Balazs Meszaros (HUN), Martin Demierre (SUI)

=== 11th place match ===
14 July 2024
13:00

Boxscore

Sweden	53–70	Portugal
Scoring by quarter: 11–19, 21–24, 12–14, 9–13
Pts: Trygger, Barbosa 10; Rebs: Trygger 14; Asts: Collins 5		Pts: Falcao 19; Rebs: Falcao 8 Asts: Silva 4

Jeep Arena, Vilnius
Attendance: 15
Referees: Ivana Ivanovic (SRB), Karol Kowalski (FIN), Milita Stalaucinskaite (LTU)

=== 9th place match ===
14 July 2024
15:30

Boxscore

Israel	73–55	Lithuania
Scoring by quarter: 16–18, 14–12, 24–9, 19–16
Pts: Bitan 19; Rebs: Dahan Sujic 8 Asts: Singer 5		Pts: Aukstikalnyte 17; Rebs: Sirtautaite 16; Asts: Sirtautaite 4

Jeep Arena, Vilnius
Attendance: 107
Referees: Karolina Andersson (FIN), Veronika Obertova (SVK), Marija Ciric (SRB)

=== Championship quarterfinals ===
12 July 2024
13:00

Boxscore

France	67–66	Turkey
Scoring by quarter: 25–14, 14–20, 13–16, 15–16
Pts: Saulnier, Zodia 16; Rebs: Le Seyec 10; Asts: Cisse 10		Pts: Istanbulluoglu, Sertoglu 23; Rebs: Istanbulluoglu 10; Asts: Sertoglu 5

Twinsbet Arena, Vilnius
Attendance: 45
Referees: Sandra Sanchez Gonzalez (ESP), Ivana Ivanovic (SRB), Alessandro Perciavalle (ITA)

12 July 2024
15:30

Boxscore

Slovenia	71–76	Germany
Scoring by quarter: 19–12, 13–17, 16–31, 23–16
Pts: Sambolic 19; Rebs: Sivka 10; Asts: Sivka 4		Pts: Bühner 20; Rebs: Rolf 12; Asts: Rolf 4

Twinsbet Arena, Vilnius
Attendance: 63
Referees: Ilias Kounelles (CYP), Veronika Obertova (SVK), Ewa Matuszewska (POL)

12 July 2024
18:00

Boxscore

Latvia	53–68	Italy
Scoring by quarter: 12–14, 16–18, 9–19, 16–17
Pts: Tomasicka 14; Rebs: Sila 9 Asts: Viksne 4		Pts: M. Villa 22; Rebs: Osazuwa 10; Asts: M. Villa 5

Twinsbet Arena, Vilnius
Attendance: 107
Referees: Özlem Yalman (TUR), Sara Månsson (SWE), Ioannis Agrafiotis (GRE)

12 July 2024
20:30

Boxscore

Spain	89–41	Poland
Scoring by quarter: 30–7, 23–16, 21–12, 15–6
Pts: Bermejo 14; Rebs: Fam 8 Asts: Bermejo 5		Pts: Makurat 14; Rebs: Tomasik 6 Asts: Piasecka, Tomasik 3

Twinsbet Arena, Vilnius
Attendance: 103
Referees: Carsten Straube (GER), Chess Van Looy (BEL), Laure Coanus (FRA)

=== 5th–8th place semifinals ===
13 July 2024
13:00

Boxscore

Turkey	53–82	Slovenia
Scoring by quarter: 9–17, 21–16, 9–28, 14–21
Pts: Guven 14; Rebs: Guven 5 Asts: Guven 4		Pts: Sambolic 25; Rebs: Brecelj 11; Asts: Sambolic 6

Twinsbet Arena, Vilnius
Attendance: 43
Referees: Carsten Straube (GER), Sara Månsson (SWE), Or Zror (ISR)

13 July 2024
15:30

Boxscore

Latvia	52–69	Poland
Scoring by quarter: 17–16, 18–15, 14–17, 3–21
Pts: Otto 19; Rebs: Viksne 11; Asts: Viksne 7		Pts: Makurat 24; Rebs: Makurat 9 Asts: Tomasik 6

Twinsbet Arena, Vilnius
Attendance: 56
Referees: Alessandro Perciavalle (ITA), Ioannis Agrafiotis (GRE), Marija Ciric (SRB)

=== 7th place match ===
14 July 2024
18:00

Boxscore

Turkey	72–52	Latvia
Scoring by quarter: 21–10, 17–13, 10–17, 24–12
Pts: Sertoglu 17; Rebs: Yavuz 9 Asts: Guven 7		Pts: Viksne, Otto 12; Rebs: Otto 8 Asts: Viksne 3

Jeep Arena, Vilnius
Attendance: 25
Referees: José Pedroso (POR), Diana Lapanović (SLO), Martin Demierre (SUI)

=== 5th place match ===
14 July 2024
13:00

Boxscore

Slovenia	74–65	Poland
Scoring by quarter: 18–27, 19–18, 19–15, 18–5
Pts: Bartelme 22; Rebs: Brecelj 12; Asts: Bartelme 8		Pts: Ulan 20; Rebs: Adamczuk 6 Asts: Tomasik 6

Twinsbet Arena, Vilnius
Attendance: 30
Referees: Radomir Vojinovic (MNE), Sara Månsson (SWE), Anna Belousova (LAT)

=== Championship semifinals ===
13 July 2024
18:00

Boxscore

France	64–55	Germany
Scoring by quarter: 13–20, 22–15, 22–4, 7–16
Pts: Dursus, Saulnier 12; Rebs: Zodia 11; Asts: Cisse 5		Pts: Bühner, Brochlitz 17; Rebs: Buhner 10; Asts: Rolf 3

Twinsbet Arena, Vilnius
Attendance: 75
Referees: Özlem Yalman (TUR), Ilias Kounelles (CYP), José Pedroso (POR)

13 July 2024
20:30

Boxscore

Italy	58–85	Spain
Scoring by quarter: 16–25, 18–22, 12–17, 12–21
Pts: Zanardi 19; Rebs: Cancelli 9 Asts: E. Villa 4		Pts: Brito 18; Rebs: Fam 7 Asts: Fam 9

Twinsbet Arena, Vilnius
Attendance: 110
Referees: Radomir Vojinovic (MNE), Ritvars Helmsteins (LAT), Veronika Obertova (SVK)

=== 3rd place match ===
14 July 2024
18:00

Boxscore

Germany	48–70	Italy
Scoring by quarter: 14–21, 15–15, 8–22, 11–12
Pts: Bühner 18; Rebs: Buhner 6 Asts: Feldrappe, Kroger 3		Pts: M. Villa 18; Rebs: M. Villa 8 Asts: M. Villa 7

Twinsbet Arena, Vilnius
Attendance: 150
Referees: Ilias Kounelles (CYP), Sandra Sánchez González (ESP), Laure Coanus (FRA)

=== Final ===
14 July 2024
20:30

Boxscore

France	83–75	Spain
Scoring by quarter: 20–24, 21–12, 18–17, 24–22
Pts: Cisse 21; Rebs: Zodia 6 Asts: Toure 5		Pts: Fam 20; Rebs: Fam 14; Asts: Bermejo 7

Twinsbet Arena, Vilnius
Referees: Özlem Yalman (TUR), Carsten Straube (GER), Ewa Matuszewska (POL)

== Final standings ==
Rank	Team	Record
1st place, gold medalist(s)	France	7–0
2nd place, silver medalist(s)	Spain	6–1
3rd place, bronze medalist(s)	Italy	6–1
4	Germany	5–2
5	Slovenia	4–3
6	Poland	3–4
7	Turkey	4–3
8	Latvia	3–4
9	Israel	4–3
10	Lithuania	2–5
11	Portugal	3–4
12	Sweden	3–4
13	Montenegro	2–5
14	Hungary	3–4
15	Serbia	1–6
16	Finland	0–7

Relegated to the 2025 FIBA U20 Women's EuroBasket Division B
