= Hungary women's national under-20 basketball team =

National basketball team of Hungary

Hungary
- FIBA zone: FIBA Europe
- National federation: Hungarian Basketball Federation

U21 World Championship
- Appearances: 1
- Medals: None

U20 EuroBasket
- Appearances: 14
- Medals: (silver) Silver: 1 (2006)

U20 EuroBasket Division B
- Appearances: 8
- Medals: (gold) Gold: 1 (2025); (silver) Silver: 1 (2014); (bronze) Bronze: 3 (2008, 2012, 2016)

The Hungary women's national under-20 basketball team is a national basketball team of Hungary, administered by the Hungarian Basketball Federation. It represents the country in international under-20 women's basketball competitions.

== FIBA U20 Women's EuroBasket participations ==
Year	Division A	Division B
2000	7th	
2002	10th	
2004	4th	
2005	12th	
2006	2nd place, silver medalist(s)	
2007	16th	
2008		3rd place, bronze medalist(s)
2009		7th
2010		5th
2011		6th
2012		3rd place, bronze medalist(s)

Year	Division A	Division B
2013	15th	
2014		2nd place, silver medalist(s)
2015	14th	
2016		3rd place, bronze medalist(s)
2017	5th	
2018	5th	
2019	8th	
2022	5th	
2023	10th	
2024	14th	
2025		1st place, gold medalist(s)

== FIBA Under-21 World Championship for Women participations ==
Year	Result
2007	7th

== See also ==
- Hungary women's national basketball team
- Hungary women's national under-19 basketball team
- Hungary men's national under-20 basketball team
