= Poland women's national under-20 basketball team =

National basketball team in Poland

Poland
- FIBA zone: FIBA Europe
- National federation: Polish Basketball Association

U20 EuroBasket
- Appearances: 19
- Medals: (silver) Silver: 1 (2005); (bronze) Bronze: 1 (2011)

U20 EuroBasket Division B
- Appearances: 2
- Medals: (silver) Silver: 1 (2008)

The Poland women's national under-20 basketball team is a national basketball team of Poland, administered by the Polish Basketball Association. It represents the country in international under-20 women's basketball competitions.

== FIBA U20 Women's EuroBasket participations ==
Year	Division A	Division B
2000	9th	
2004	6th	
2005	2nd place, silver medalist(s)	
2006	15th	
2007		6th
2008		2nd place, silver medalist(s)
2009	5th	
2010	9th	
2011	3rd place, bronze medalist(s)	
2012	10th	
2013	12th	

Year	Division A	Division B
2014	6th	
2015	7th	
2016	8th	
2017	10th	
2018	12th	
2019	7th	
2022	7th	
2023	11th	
2024	6th	
2025	10th	

== See also ==
- Poland women's national basketball team
- Poland women's national under-19 basketball team
- Poland men's national under-20 basketball team
