= 2016 FIBA U20 Women's European Championship Division B =

Tournament details
- Host country: Montenegro
- City: Podgorica
- Dates: 9–17 July 2016
- Teams: 13 (from 1 confederation)
- Venue: 1 (in 1 host city)

Final positions
- Champions: Slovenia (1st title)
- Runners-up: Lithuania
- Third place: Hungary

Official website
- www.fiba.basketball

The 2016 FIBA U20 Women's European Championship Division B was the 12th edition of the Division B of the Women's European basketball championship for national under-20 teams. It was held in Podgorica, Montenegro, from the 9th to the 17th of July 2016. Slovenia women's national under-20 basketball team won the tournament.

== Participating teams ==
- Belarus
- Bulgaria
- Croatia
- Czech Republic ▼ (15th place, 2015 FIBA Europe Under-20 Championship for Women Division A)
- Great Britain
- Hungary ▼ (14th place, 2015 FIBA Europe Under-20 Championship for Women Division A)
- Ireland
- Israel
- Lithuania
- Montenegro
- Romania
- Slovenia
- Ukraine ▼ (16th place, 2015 FIBA Europe Under-20 Championship for Women Division A)

== First round ==
In the first round, the teams were drawn into four groups. The first two teams from each group advance to the quarterfinal round, the other teams will play in the classification round for 9th to 13th place.

=== Group A ===
Pos	Team	Pld	W	L	PF	PA	PD	Pts	Qualification
1	Czech Republic	2	1	1	135	106	+29	3	Quarterfinal round
2	Hungary	2	1	1	119	105	+14	3	Quarterfinal round
3	Ukraine	2	1	1	82	125	−43	3	Classification round for 9th–13th place

Source: FIBA

9 July 2016

Boxscore

Ukraine	34–78	Czech Republic

10 July 2016

Boxscore

Czech Republic	57–72	Hungary

11 July 2016

Boxscore

Hungary	47–48	Ukraine

=== Group B ===
Pos	Team	Pld	W	L	PF	PA	PD	Pts	Qualification
1	Romania	3	3	0	170	149	+21	6	Quarterfinal round
2	Croatia	3	2	1	204	170	+34	5	Quarterfinal round
3	Belarus	3	1	2	163	177	−14	4	Classification round for 9th–13th place
4	Bulgaria	3	0	3	159	200	−41	3	Classification round for 9th–13th place

Source: FIBA

9 July 2016

Boxscore

Romania	47–39	Belarus

9 July 2016

Boxscore

Croatia	76–47	Bulgaria

10 July 2016

Boxscore

Bulgaria	56–61	Romania

10 July 2016

Boxscore

Belarus	61–74	Croatia

11 July 2016

Boxscore

Romania	62–54	Croatia

11 July 2016

Boxscore

Bulgaria	56–63	Belarus

=== Group C ===
Pos	Team	Pld	W	L	PF	PA	PD	Pts	Qualification
1	Lithuania	2	2	0	124	103	+21	4	Quarterfinal round
2	Great Britain	2	1	1	116	111	+5	3	Quarterfinal round
3	Israel	2	0	2	111	137	−26	2	Classification round for 9th–13th place

Source: FIBA

9 July 2016

Boxscore

Great Britain	42–61	Lithuania

10 July 2016

Boxscore

Lithuania	63–61	Israel

11 July 2016

Boxscore

Israel	50–74	Great Britain

=== Group D ===
Pos	Team	Pld	W	L	PF	PA	PD	Pts	Qualification
1	Slovenia	2	2	0	162	129	+33	4	Quarterfinal round
2	Montenegro	2	1	1	153	118	+35	3	Quarterfinal round
3	Ireland	2	0	2	98	166	−68	2	Classification round for 9th–13th place

Source: FIBA

9 July 2016

Boxscore

Ireland	57–85	Slovenia

10 July 2016

Boxscore

Slovenia	77–72	Montenegro

11 July 2016

Boxscore

Montenegro	81–41	Ireland

== Classification round for 9th–13th place ==
Pos	Team	Pld	W	L	PF	PA	PD	Pts
9	Ukraine	4	4	0	270	239	+31	8
10	Israel	4	3	1	272	184	+88	7
11	Belarus	4	2	2	225	199	+26	6
12	Bulgaria	4	1	3	235	266	−31	5
13	Ireland	4	0	4	165	279	−114	4

Source: FIBA

13 July 2016

Boxscore

Bulgaria	73–51	Ireland

13 July 2016

Boxscore

Israel	70–75	Ukraine

14 July 2016

Boxscore

Belarus	45–55	Israel

14 July 2016

Boxscore

Ukraine	73–66	Bulgaria

15 July 2016

Boxscore

Ireland	55–69	Ukraine

16 July 2016

Boxscore

Israel	79–40	Bulgaria

16 July 2016

Boxscore

Belarus	69–35	Ireland

17 July 2016

Boxscore

Ukraine	53–48	Belarus

17 July 2016

Boxscore

Ireland	24–68	Israel

== Quarterfinal round ==
In this round, the teams play in two groups. The first two teams from each group advance to the semifinals, the other teams will play in the 5th–8th place playoffs.

=== Group E ===
Pos	Team	Pld	W	L	PF	PA	PD	Pts	Qualification
1	Hungary	3	2	1	177	149	+28	5	Semifinals
2	Czech Republic	3	2	1	229	171	+58	5	Semifinals
3	Romania	3	1	2	161	195	−34	4	5th–8th place playoffs
4	Croatia	3	1	2	146	198	−52	4	5th–8th place playoffs

Source: FIBA

13 July 2016

Boxscore

Czech Republic	97–47	Croatia

13 July 2016

Boxscore

Hungary	66–47	Romania

14 July 2016

Boxscore

Romania	52–75	Czech Republic

14 July 2016

Boxscore

Croatia	45–39	Hungary

=== Group F ===
Pos	Team	Pld	W	L	PF	PA	PD	Pts	Qualification
1	Lithuania	3	3	0	222	168	+54	6	Semifinals
2	Slovenia	3	2	1	212	199	+13	5	Semifinals
3	Montenegro	3	1	2	207	219	−12	4	5th–8th place playoffs
4	Great Britain	3	0	3	150	205	−55	3	5th–8th place playoffs

Source: FIBA

13 July 2016

Boxscore

Lithuania	84–60	Montenegro

13 July 2016

Boxscore

Great Britain	50–69	Slovenia

14 July 2016

Boxscore

Slovenia	66–77	Lithuania

14 July 2016

Boxscore

Montenegro	75–58	Great Britain

== 5th–8th place playoffs ==
5th–8th place semifinals
E3	Romania	42
F4	Great Britain	62
F3	Montenegro	71
E4	Croatia	61

5th place match
F4	Great Britain	63
F3	Montenegro	46
7th place match
E3	Romania	62
E4	Croatia	64

=== 5th–8th place semifinals ===
16 July 2016

Boxscore

Romania	42–62	Great Britain

16 July 2016

Boxscore

Montenegro	71–61	Croatia

=== 7th place match ===
17 July 2016

Boxscore

Romania	62–64	Croatia

=== 5th place match ===
17 July 2016

Boxscore

Great Britain	63–46	Montenegro

== Championship playoffs ==
Semifinals
E1	Hungary	56
F2	Slovenia	66
F1	Lithuania	72
E2	Czech Republic	51

Finals
F2	Slovenia	62
F1	Lithuania	45
3rd place match
E1	Hungary	50
E2	Czech Republic	49

=== Semifinals ===
16 July 2016

Boxscore

Hungary	56–66	Slovenia

16 July 2016

Boxscore

Lithuania	72–51	Czech Republic

=== 3rd place match ===
17 July 2016

Boxscore

Hungary	50–49	Czech Republic

=== Final ===
17 July 2016

Boxscore

Slovenia	62–45	Lithuania

== Final standings ==
Rank	Team
1st place, gold medalist(s)	Slovenia
2nd place, silver medalist(s)	Lithuania
3rd place, bronze medalist(s)	Hungary
4	Czech Republic
5	Great Britain
6	Montenegro
7	Croatia
8	Romania
9	Ukraine
10	Israel
11	Belarus
12	Bulgaria
13	Ireland

Promoted to the 2017 FIBA U20 Women's European Championship Division A
