= Czech Republic women's national under-20 basketball team =

National basketball team of Czech Republic

Czech Republic
- FIBA zone: FIBA Europe
- National federation: Czech Basketball Federation

U21 World Championship
- Appearances: 1
- Medals: None

U20 EuroBasket
- Appearances: 14
- Medals: (gold) Gold: 1 (2002); (silver) Silver: 2 (2000, 2022); (bronze) Bronze: 1 (2004)

U20 EuroBasket Division B
- Appearances: 8
- Medals: (gold) Gold: 1 (2018); (silver) Silver: 1 (2013); (bronze) Bronze: 2 (2010, 2024)

The Czech Republic women's national under-20 basketball team is a national basketball team of the Czech Republic, administered by the Czech Basketball Federation. It represents the country in international under-20 women's basketball competitions.

== FIBA U20 Women's EuroBasket participations ==
Year	Division A	Division B
2000	2nd place, silver medalist(s)	
2002	1st place, gold medalist(s)	
2004	3rd place, bronze medalist(s)	
2005	10th	
2006	10th	
2007	14th	
2008	10th	
2009	15th	
2010		3rd place, bronze medalist(s)
2011		4th
2012		5th

Year	Division A	Division B
2013		2nd place, silver medalist(s)
2014	11th	
2015	15th	
2016		4th
2017		6th
2018		1st place, gold medalist(s)
2019	9th	
2022	2nd place, silver medalist(s)	
2023	14th	
2024		3rd place, bronze medalist(s)
2025	16th	

== FIBA Under-21 World Championship for Women participations ==
Year	Result
2003	9th

== See also ==
- Czech Republic women's national basketball team
- Czech Republic women's national under-19 basketball team
- Czech Republic men's national under-20 basketball team
