= Spain women's national under-20 basketball team =

National basketball team of Spain

Spain
- FIBA zone: FIBA Europe
- National federation: FEB

U21 World Championship
- Appearances: 1
- Medals: None

U20 EuroBasket
- Appearances: 23
- Medals: (gold) Gold: 10 (2007, 2011, 2012, 2013, 2015, 2016, 2017, 2018, 2022, 2025); (silver) Silver: 4 (2009, 2010, 2014, 2024); (bronze) Bronze: 2 (2023, 2026)
Home	Away
Medal record
Event	1st	2nd	3rd
FIBA U21 World Championship	0	0	0
FIBA U20 Women's EuroBasket	10	4	2
Total	10	4	2

The Spain women's national under-20 basketball team is the representative for Spain in international under-20 women's basketball competitions, and it is organized and run by the Spanish Basketball Federation. The U20 team represents Spain at the FIBA U20 Women's EuroBasket. Between 2003 and 2007, the U21 team represented Spain at the former FIBA Under-21 World Championship for Women.

== FIBA U20 Women's EuroBasket participations ==
Year	Pos.	Pld	W	L
(Slovenia) 2000	5th	8	7	1
(Croatia) 2002	5th	8	4	4
(France) 2004	9th	7	3	4
(Czech Republic) 2005	8th	8	2	6
(Hungary) 2006	4th	8	4	4
(Bulgaria) 2007	1st place, gold medalist(s)	8	8	0
(Italy) 2008	4th	8	5	3
(Poland) 2009	2nd place, silver medalist(s)	9	8	1
(Latvia) 2010	2nd place, silver medalist(s)	9	8	1
(Serbia) 2011	1st place, gold medalist(s)	9	9	0
(Hungary) 2012	1st place, gold medalist(s)	9	8	1
(Turkey) 2013	1st place, gold medalist(s)	9	9	0
(Italy) 2014	2nd place, silver medalist(s)	9	7	2
(Spain) 2015	1st place, gold medalist(s)	9	9	0
(Portugal) 2016	1st place, gold medalist(s)	7	6	1
(Portugal) 2017	1st place, gold medalist(s)	7	7	0
(Hungary) 2018	1st place, gold medalist(s)	7	7	0
(Czech Republic) 2019	5th	7	6	1
(Hungary) 2022	1st place, gold medalist(s)	7	7	0
(Lithuania) 2023	3rd place, bronze medalist(s)	7	6	1
(Lithuania) 2024	2nd place, silver medalist(s)	7	6	1
(Portugal) 2025	1st place, gold medalist(s)	7	6	1
(Lithuania) 2026	3rd place, bronze medalist(s)	7	6	1
Total	23/23	181	148	33

== FIBA Under-21 World Championship for Women participations ==
Year	Pos.	Pld	W	L
(Croatia) 2003	Did not qualify			
(Russia) 2007	9th	7	3	4
Total	1/2	7	3	4

== See also ==
- Spain women's national basketball team
- Spain women's national under-19 basketball team
- Spain women's national under-17 basketball team
- Spain men's national under-20 basketball team
