= 2017 FIBA U20 Women's European Championship =

16th FIBA Under-20 Women's European Basketball Championship

Tournament details
- Host country: Portugal
- Dates: 8–16 July 2017
- Teams: 16 (from 1 federation)
- Venues: 3 (in 1 host city)

Final positions
- Champions: Spain (7th title)

Tournament statistics
- MVP: (Spain) María Araújo
- Top scorer: (Bosnia and Herzegovina) Brčaninović (23.0)
- Top rebounds: (Italy) Andrè (15.5)
- Top assists: (Hungary) Studer (7.3)
- PPG (Team): (Hungary) (Spain) (77.4)
- RPG (Team): (Italy) (49.7)
- APG (Team): (Russia) (22.0)

Official website
- www.fiba.basketball

The 2017 FIBA U20 Women's European Championship was the 16th edition of the Women's U-20 European basketball championship. 16 teams participated in the competition, which was played in Matosinhos, Portugal, from 8 to 16 July 2017.

== Venues ==
2017 FIBA U20 Women's European Championship is located in Portugal	Matosinhos		Custoias
2017 FIBA U20 Women's European Championship is located in Portugal	Centro de Desportos e Congressos	Pavilhao Municipal de Guiföes	Custoias Arena
2017 FIBA U20 Women's European Championship is located in Portugal	Capacity: 4,300	Capacity: 750	Capacity: 600

== Participating teams ==
- Belgium
- Bosnia and Herzegovina
- France
- Hungary ▲ (3rd place, 2016 FIBA U20 Women's European Championship Division B)
- Italy
- Latvia
- Lithuania ▲ (Runners-up, 2016 FIBA U20 Women's European Championship Division B)
- Netherlands
- Poland
- Portugal
- Russia
- Serbia
- Slovenia ▲ (Winners, 2016 FIBA U20 Women's European Championship Division B)
- Spain
- Sweden
- Turkey

== Preliminary round ==
In this round, the 16 teams are allocated in four groups of four teams each. All teams advance to the playoff round of 16.

=== Group A ===
Pos	Team	Pld	W	L	PF	PA	PD	Pts
1	Spain	3	3	0	236	143	+93	6
2	Poland	3	2	1	194	167	+27	5
3	Belgium	3	1	2	157	198	−41	4
4	Sweden	3	0	3	146	225	−79	3

Source: FIBA

8 July
14:00

Boxscore

Sweden	63–73	Belgium
Scoring by quarter: 13–27, 16–21, 17–6, 17–19
Pts: F. Wadling 21; Rebs: F. Wadling 13; Asts: E. Stocklassa 6		Pts: L. Henket 24; Rebs: B. Mununga 10; Asts: E. Ramette 10

Pavilhão Municipal de Guifões, Matosinhos
Referees:
(Serbia) Ivana Ivanovic
(Georgia (country)) Maka Kupatadze
(Netherlands) Anthonie Sinterniklaas

8 July
20:45

Boxscore

Poland	59–84	Spain
Scoring by quarter: 15–17, 13–22, 17–17, 14–28
Pts: Z. Puc 16; Rebs: A. Parzenska 6 Asts: A. Szloser 4		Pts: Á. Salvadores 27; Rebs: I. López 7 Asts: M. Cazorla 4

Pavilhão Municipal de Guifões, Matosinhos
Referees:
(Albania) Gentian Cici
(Russia) Igor Demenkov
(Namibia) Sarty Nghixulifwa

9 July
16:15

Boxscore

Spain	87–48	Sweden
Scoring by quarter: 12–7, 23–16, 27–13, 25–12
Pts: P. Ginzo 18; Rebs: I. López 8 Asts: M. Cazorla 4		Pts: F. Wadling 9 Rebs: F. Wadling 4 Asts: G. Ozturk 4

Centro de Desportos e Congressos, Matosinhos
Referees:
(Lithuania) Tomas Jasevicius
(Hungary) Tamas Földhazi
(Norway) Viola Györgyi

9 July
20:45

Boxscore

Belgium	48–70	Poland
Scoring by quarter: 12–21, 15–18, 14–18, 7–13
Pts: L. Resimont 20; Rebs: E. Ramette 8 Asts: E. Ramette 7		Pts: Z. Puc 18; Rebs: Z. Puc 10; Asts: J. Niemojewska 9

Centro de Desportos e Congressos, Matosinhos
Referees:
(Slovenia) Marko Vuckovic
(Bosnia and Herzegovina) Mila Cavara
(Russia) Sergey Mikhaylov

10 July
16:15

Boxscore

Spain	65–36	Belgium
Scoring by quarter: 14–9, 13–14, 20–7, 18–6
Pts: M. Conde 18; Rebs: M. Araújo 8 Asts: M. Martianez 3		Pts: B. Mununga 14; Rebs: B. Mununga 8 Asts: L. Henket 2

Centro de Desportos e Congressos, Matosinhos
Referees:
(Montenegro) Radomir Vojinovic
(Serbia) Ivana Ivanovic
(Portugal) Nuno Monteiro

10 July
18:30

Boxscore

Sweden	35–65	Poland
Scoring by quarter: 7–12, 9–14, 9–17, 10–22
Pts: A. Camber 9 Rebs: A. Dahl 6 Asts: V. Danielsson 3		Pts: A. Parzenska 15; Rebs: A. Parzenska 7 Asts: A. Szloser 3

Pavilhão Municipal de Guifões, Matosinhos
Referees:
(Turkey) Özlem Yalman
(Albania) Gentian Cici
(Russia) Igor Demenkov

=== Group B ===
Pos	Team	Pld	W	L	PF	PA	PD	Pts
1	Italy	3	3	0	196	171	+25	6
2	Portugal	3	2	1	198	195	+3	5
3	Latvia	3	1	2	200	205	−5	4
4	Lithuania	3	0	3	196	219	−23	3

Source: FIBA

8 July

Boxscore

Latvia	78–66	Lithuania

Pavilhão Municipal de Guifões, Matosinhos

8 July

Boxscore

Portugal	55–59	Italy

Centro de Desportos e Congressos, Matosinhos

9 July

Boxscore

Italy	67–55	Latvia

Centro de Desportos e Congressos, Matosinhos

9 July

Boxscore

Lithuania	69–71	Portugal

Centro de Desportos e Congressos, Matosinhos

10 July

Boxscore

Italy	70–61	Lithuania

Pavilhão Municipal de Guifões, Matosinhos

10 July

Boxscore

Latvia	67–72	Portugal

Pavilhão Municipal de Guifões, Matosinhos

=== Group C ===
Pos	Team	Pld	W	L	PF	PA	PD	Pts
1	Slovenia	3	2	1	205	183	+22	5 (Note: Slovenia 1–1, +18; Hungary 1–1, -1; France 1–1, -17)
2	Hungary	3	2	1	238	224	+14	5
3	France	3	2	1	209	216	−7	5
4	Bosnia and Herzegovina	3	0	3	202	231	−29	3

Source: FIBA
Notes:

8 July

Boxscore

Bosnia and Herzegovina	57–61	Slovenia

Centro de Desportos e Congressos, Matosinhos

8 July

Boxscore

Hungary	86–65	France

Pavilhão Municipal de Guifões, Matosinhos

9 July

Boxscore

France	73–63	Bosnia and Herzegovina

Pavilhão Municipal de Guifões, Matosinhos

9 July

Boxscore

Slovenia	77–55	Hungary

Pavilhão Municipal de Guifões, Matosinhos

10 July

Boxscore

France	71–67	Slovenia

Centro de Desportos e Congressos, Matosinhos

10 July

Boxscore

Bosnia and Herzegovina	82–97	Hungary

Centro de Desportos e Congressos, Matosinhos

=== Group D ===
Pos	Team	Pld	W	L	PF	PA	PD	Pts
1	Russia	3	3	0	242	204	+38	6
2	Netherlands	3	1	2	227	229	−2	4 (Note: Netherlands 1–1, +3; Serbia 1–1, -1; Turkey 1–1, -2)
3	Serbia	3	1	2	209	213	−4	4
4	Turkey	3	1	2	185	217	−32	4

Source: FIBA
Notes:

8 July

Boxscore

Turkey	68–74	Netherlands

Centro de Desportos e Congressos, Matosinhos

8 July

Boxscore

Serbia	72–75	Russia

Centro de Desportos e Congressos, Matosinhos

9 July

Boxscore

Netherlands	72–75	Serbia

Pavilhão Municipal de Guifões, Matosinhos

9 July

Boxscore

Russia	81–51	Turkey

Pavilhão Municipal de Guifões, Matosinhos

10 July

Boxscore

Turkey	66–62	Serbia

Pavilhão Municipal de Guifões, Matosinhos

10 July

Boxscore

Russia	86–81	Netherlands

Centro de Desportos e Congressos, Matosinhos

== Knockout stage ==
=== Bracket ===
Round of 16
12 July
Spain	99
Lithuania	83
12 July
Hungary	86
Serbia	72
12 July
Portugal	42
Belgium	67
12 July
Russia	91
Bosnia and Herzegovina	65
12 July
Poland	39
Latvia	66
12 July
Slovenia	80
Turkey	65
12 July
Italy	69
Sweden	46
12 July
Netherlands	63
France	74

Quarter-finals
13 July
Spain	67
Hungary	53
13 July
Belgium	49
Russia	56
13 July
Latvia	61
Slovenia	64
13 July
Italy	61
France	77

Semi-finals
15 July
Spain	67
Russia	55
15 July
Slovenia	81
France	75

Final
16 July
Spain	73
Slovenia	63
3rd place game
16 July
Russia	80
France	59

5th–8th place bracket

5th–8th place semifinals
15 July
Hungary	87
Belgium	66
15 July
Latvia	87
Italy	89

5th place game
16 July
Hungary	78
Italy	73
7th place game
16 July
Belgium	72
Latvia	52

9th–16th place bracket

9th–16th place quarterfinals
13 July
Lithuania	73
Serbia	79
13 July
Portugal	80
Bosnia and Herzegovina	77
13 July
Poland	77
Turkey	68
13 July
Sweden	54
Netherlands	53

9th–12th place semifinals
15 July
Serbia	71
Portugal	62
15 July
Poland	57
Sweden	36

9th place game
16 July
Serbia	67
Poland	59
11th place game
16 July
Portugal	48
Sweden	52

13th–16th place bracket

13th–16th place semifinals
15 July
Lithuania	80
Bosnia and Herzegovina	77
15 July
Turkey	72
Netherlands	80

13th place game
16 July
Lithuania	56
Netherlands	74
15th place game
16 July
Bosnia and Herzegovina	70
Turkey	81

== Final standings ==
Rank	Team	Record
Gold medal	Spain	7–0
Silver medal	Slovenia	5–2
Bronze medal	Russia	6–1
4th	France	4–3
5th	Hungary	5–2
6th	Italy	5–2
7th	Belgium	3–4
8th	Latvia	2–5
9th	Serbia	4–3
10th	Poland	4–3
11th	Sweden	2–5
12th	Portugal	3–4
13th	Netherlands	3–4
14th	Lithuania	1–6
15th	Turkey	2–5
16th	Bosnia and Herzegovina	0–7

Relegated to the 2018 FIBA U20 Women's European Championship Division B
