= 2023 FIBA U20 Women's European Championship =

Under-20 basketball championship

Tournament details
- Host country: Lithuania
- City: Klaipėda, Vilnius
- Dates: 29 July – 6 August 2023
- Teams: 16 (from 1 confederation)
- Venues: 2 (in 2 host cities)

Final positions
- Champions: France (4th title)
- Runners-up: Latvia
- Third place: Spain

Official website
- www.fiba.basketball

The 2023 FIBA U20 Women's European Championship was the 20th edition of the European basketball championship for women's national under-20 teams. It was played from 29 July to 6 August 2023 in Klaipėda and Vilnius, Lithuania. France women's national under-20 basketball team won the tournament and became the European champions for the fourth time.

== Participating teams ==
- Belgium
- Czech Republic
- Finland
- France
- Hungary
- Israel ▲ (Third place, 2022 FIBA U20 Women's European Championship Division B)
- Italy
- Latvia
- Lithuania
- Montenegro ▲ (Winners, 2022 FIBA U20 Women's European Championship Division B)
- Poland
- Portugal
- Serbia
- Spain
- Sweden
- Turkey ▲ (Runners-up, 2022 FIBA U20 Women's European Championship Division B)

== Venues ==
Vilnius	Klaipėda
Jeep Arena	Švyturys Arena
Capacity: 2,500	Capacity: 6,200
2023 FIBA U20 Women's European Championship is located in Lithuania

== First round ==
The draw of the first round was held on 14 February 2023 in Freising, Germany.

In the first round, the teams were drawn into four groups of four. All teams advance to the playoffs.

All times are local (Eastern European Summer Time – UTC+3).

=== Group A ===
Pos	Team	Pld	W	L	PF	PA	PD	Pts
1	Serbia	3	2	1	211	222	−11	5
2	Israel	3	2	1	225	220	+5	5
3	Portugal	3	1	2	216	226	−10	4
4	Czech Republic	3	1	2	234	218	+16	4

Source: FIBA

29 July 2023
13:00

Boxscore

Portugal	83–68	Czech Republic
Scoring by quarter: 21–19, 21–11, 20–21, 21–17

Švyturys Arena, Klaipėda

29 July 2023
15:30

Boxscore

Israel	70–73	Serbia
Scoring by quarter: 20–16, 17–14, 20–18, 13–25

Švyturys Arena, Klaipėda

30 July 2023
13:00

Boxscore

Serbia	77–59	Portugal
Scoring by quarter: 15–21, 20–17, 24–6, 18–15

Švyturys Arena, Klaipėda

30 July 2023
20:30

Boxscore

Czech Republic	73–74	Israel
Scoring by quarter: 14–18, 31–21, 12–13, 16–22

Švyturys Arena, Klaipėda

1 August 2023
15:30

Boxscore

Portugal	74–81	Israel
Scoring by quarter: 11–17, 19–19, 12–23, 32–22

Švyturys Arena, Klaipėda

1 August 2023
20:30

Boxscore

Serbia	61–93	Czech Republic
Scoring by quarter: 13–28, 18–21, 13–26, 17–18

Švyturys Arena, Klaipėda

=== Group B ===
Pos	Team	Pld	W	L	PF	PA	PD	Pts
1	France	3	3	0	235	145	+90	6
2	Hungary	3	2	1	202	179	+23	5
3	Finland	3	1	2	206	203	+3	4
4	Lithuania (H)	3	0	3	118	234	−116	3

Source: FIBA
(H) Hosts

29 July 2023
18:00

Boxscore

Lithuania	34–72	Hungary
Scoring by quarter: 7–27, 10–16, 9–15, 8–14

Švyturys Arena, Klaipėda

29 July 2023
20:30

Boxscore

Finland	55–79	France
Scoring by quarter: 9–18, 12–27, 23–17, 11–17

Švyturys Arena, Klaipėda

30 July 2023
15:30

Boxscore

Hungary	76–72	Finland
Scoring by quarter: 17–13, 16–18, 25–18, 18–23

Švyturys Arena, Klaipėda

30 July 2023
18:00

Boxscore

France	83–36	Lithuania
Scoring by quarter: 19–9, 21–11, 21–10, 22–6

Švyturys Arena, Klaipėda

1 August 2023
13:00

Boxscore

France	73–54	Hungary
Scoring by quarter: 23–8, 20–14, 8–20, 22–12

Švyturys Arena, Klaipėda

1 August 2023
18:00

Boxscore

Lithuania	48–79	Finland
Scoring by quarter: 16–22, 10–21, 12–18, 10–18

Švyturys Arena, Klaipėda

=== Group C ===
Pos	Team	Pld	W	L	PF	PA	PD	Pts
1	Spain	3	3	0	253	139	+114	6
2	Poland	3	1	2	186	225	−39	4
3	Montenegro	3	1	2	161	202	−41	4
4	Sweden	3	1	2	167	201	−34	4

Source: FIBA

29 July 2023
13:00

Boxscore

Sweden	67–63	Poland
Scoring by quarter: 16–7, 25–21, 20–22, 6–13

Jeep Arena, Vilnius

29 July 2023
15:30

Boxscore

Montenegro	38–80	Spain
Scoring by quarter: 11–21, 10–17, 9–23, 8–19

Jeep Arena, Vilnius

30 July 2023
13:00

Boxscore

Spain	75–49	Sweden
Scoring by quarter: 15–14, 20–5, 17–18, 23–12

Jeep Arena, Vilnius

30 July 2023
20:30

Boxscore

Poland	71–60	Montenegro
Scoring by quarter: 20–17, 15–19, 15–16, 21–8

Jeep Arena, Vilnius

1 August 2023
18:00

Boxscore

Sweden	51–63	Montenegro
Scoring by quarter: 10–11, 9–20, 18–17, 14–15

Jeep Arena, Vilnius

1 August 2023
20:30

Boxscore

Spain	98–52	Poland
Scoring by quarter: 22–16, 24–7, 27–7, 25–22

Jeep Arena, Vilnius

=== Group D ===
Pos	Team	Pld	W	L	PF	PA	PD	Pts
1	Latvia	3	2	1	205	191	+14	5
2	Italy	3	2	1	216	198	+18	5
3	Turkey	3	1	2	171	195	−24	4
4	Belgium	3	1	2	191	199	−8	4

Source: FIBA

29 July 2023
18:00

Boxscore

Latvia	62–66	Belgium
Scoring by quarter: 18–16, 20–12, 9–18, 15–20

Jeep Arena, Vilnius

29 July 2023
20:30

Boxscore

Turkey	54–71	Italy
Scoring by quarter: 10–19, 16–11, 15–15, 13–26

Jeep Arena, Vilnius

30 July 2023
15:30

Boxscore

Belgium	57–61	Turkey
Scoring by quarter: 20–14, 17–11, 8–14, 12–22

Jeep Arena, Vilnius

30 July 2023
18:00

Boxscore

Italy	69–76	Latvia
Scoring by quarter: 19–22, 13–21, 19–20, 18–13

Jeep Arena, Vilnius

1 August 2023
13:00

Boxscore

Italy	76–68	Belgium
Scoring by quarter: 22–11, 18–18, 14–15, 22–24

Jeep Arena, Vilnius

1 August 2023
15:30

Boxscore

Latvia	67–56	Turkey
Scoring by quarter: 14–13, 22–13, 13–19, 18–11

Jeep Arena, Vilnius

== Playoff brackets ==
=== Main bracket ===
Round of 16
2 August
Serbia	86
Lithuania	46
2 August
Poland	63
Turkey	70
2 August
Hungary	68
Portugal	70
2 August
Latvia	81
Sweden	72
2 August
Israel	63
Finland	53
2 August
Spain	77
Belgium	62
2 August
France	100
Czech Republic	69
2 August
Italy	79
Montenegro	64

Quarterfinals
4 August
Serbia	70
Turkey	46
4 August
Portugal	49
Latvia	58
4 August
Israel	52
Spain	60
4 August
France (OT)	84
Italy	83

Semifinals
5 August
Serbia	53
Latvia	56
5 August
Spain	47
France	75

Final
6 August
Latvia	59
France	85
3rd place match
6 August
Serbia	36
Spain	94

=== 5th place bracket ===
5th–8th place semifinals
5 August
Turkey	54
Portugal	63
5 August
Israel	68
Italy	92

5th place match
6 August
Portugal	64
Italy	75
7th place match
6 August
Turkey	57
Israel	81

=== 9th place bracket ===
9th–16th place quarterfinals
4 August
Lithuania	51
Poland	66
4 August
Hungary	67
Sweden	59
4 August
Finland	66
Belgium	60
4 August
Czech Republic	69
Montenegro	78

9th–12th place semifinals
5 August
Poland	60
Hungary	73
5 August
Finland	65
Montenegro	48

9th place match
6 August
Hungary	68
Finland	71
11th place match
6 August
Poland	86
Montenegro	63

=== 13th place bracket ===
13th–16th place semifinals
5 August
Lithuania	60
Sweden	72
5 August
Belgium	53
Czech Republic	70

13th place match
6 August
Sweden	83
Czech Republic	71
15th place match
6 August
Lithuania	59
Belgium	67

== Playoff results ==
=== Round of 16 ===
2 August 2023
13:00

Boxscore

Hungary	68–70	Portugal
Scoring by quarter: 21–24, 21–12, 12–13, 14–21

Švyturys Arena, Klaipėda

2 August 2023
13:00

Boxscore

Italy	79–64	Montenegro
Scoring by quarter: 17–16, 19–13, 29–15, 14–20

Jeep Arena, Vilnius

2 August 2023
15:30

Boxscore

Israel	63–53	Finland
Scoring by quarter: 13–25, 13–8, 26–10, 11–10

Švyturys Arena, Klaipėda

2 August 2023
15:30

Boxscore

Latvia	81–72	Sweden
Scoring by quarter: 21–13, 22–23, 22–17, 16–19

Jeep Arena, Vilnius

2 August 2023
18:00

Boxscore

Serbia	86–46	Lithuania
Scoring by quarter: 30–14, 16–10, 16–9, 24–13

Švyturys Arena, Klaipėda

2 August 2023
18:00

Boxscore

Poland	63–70	Turkey
Scoring by quarter: 15–15, 24–22, 9–16, 15–17

Jeep Arena, Vilnius

2 August 2023
20:30

Boxscore

France	100–69	Czech Republic
Scoring by quarter: 25–15, 33–14, 22–23, 20–17

Švyturys Arena, Klaipėda

2 August 2023
20:30

Boxscore

Spain	77–62	Belgium
Scoring by quarter: 18–18, 21–19, 23–8, 15–17

Jeep Arena, Vilnius

=== 9th–16th place quarterfinals ===
4 August 2023
13:00

Boxscore

Lithuania	51–66	Poland
Scoring by quarter: 11–19, 9–15, 16–20, 15–12

Jeep Arena, Vilnius

4 August 2023
15:30

Boxscore

Hungary	67–59	Sweden
Scoring by quarter: 8–12, 18–18, 19–10, 22–19

Jeep Arena, Vilnius

4 August 2023
18:00

Boxscore

Finland	66–60	Belgium
Scoring by quarter: 19–19, 19–17, 13–18, 15–6

Jeep Arena, Vilnius

4 August 2023
20:30

Boxscore

Czech Republic	69–78	Montenegro
Scoring by quarter: 19–15, 17–17, 19–18, 14–28

Jeep Arena, Vilnius

=== 13th–16th place semifinals ===
5 August 2023
13:00

Boxscore

Lithuania	60–72	Sweden
Scoring by quarter: 15–19, 18–24, 14–17, 13–12

Jeep Arena, Vilnius

5 August 2023
15:30

Boxscore

Belgium	53–70	Czech Republic
Scoring by quarter: 16–21, 13–11, 7–24, 17–14

Jeep Arena, Vilnius

=== 15th place match ===
6 August 2023
11:30

Boxscore

Lithuania	59–67	Belgium
Scoring by quarter: 23–20, 14–11, 9–22, 13–14

Jeep Arena, Vilnius

=== 13th place match ===
6 August 2023
19:00

Boxscore

Sweden	83–71	Czech Republic
Scoring by quarter: 24–17, 23–21, 17–16, 19–17

Jeep Arena, Vilnius

=== 9th–12th place semifinals ===
5 August 2023
18:00

Boxscore

Poland	60–73	Hungary
Scoring by quarter: 10–20, 20–16, 19–17, 11–20

Jeep Arena, Vilnius

5 August 2023
20:30

Boxscore

Finland	65–48	Montenegro
Scoring by quarter: 9–14, 20–2, 26–12, 10–20

Jeep Arena, Vilnius

=== 11th place match ===
6 August 2023
14:00

Boxscore

Poland	86–63	Montenegro
Scoring by quarter: 15–21, 25–9, 27–10, 19–23

Jeep Arena, Vilnius

=== 9th place match ===
6 August 2023
16:30

Boxscore

Hungary	68–71	Finland
Scoring by quarter: 11–17, 15–20, 21–15, 21–19

Jeep Arena, Vilnius

=== Championship quarterfinals ===
4 August 2023
13:00

Boxscore

France	84–83 (OT)	Italy
Scoring by quarter: 25–17, 13–19, 19–18, 18–21, Overtime: 9–8

Švyturys Arena, Klaipėda

4 August 2023
15:30

Boxscore

Israel	52–60	Spain
Scoring by quarter: 11–17, 15–10, 19–21, 7–12

Švyturys Arena, Klaipėda

4 August 2023
18:00

Boxscore

Serbia	70–46	Turkey
Scoring by quarter: 23–13, 12–15, 16–11, 19–7

Švyturys Arena, Klaipėda

4 August 2023
20:30

Boxscore

Portugal	49–58	Latvia
Scoring by quarter: 11–20, 13–13, 13–10, 12–15

Švyturys Arena, Klaipėda

=== 5th–8th place semifinals ===
5 August 2023
13:00

Boxscore

Israel	68–92	Italy
Scoring by quarter: 16–26, 25–19, 16-29, 11-18

Švyturys Arena, Klaipėda

5 August 2023
15:30

Boxscore

Turkey	54–63	Portugal
Scoring by quarter: 14–15, 4–17, 14–16, 22–15

Švyturys Arena, Klaipėda

=== 7th place match ===
6 August 2023
13:00

Boxscore

Turkey	57–81	Israel
Scoring by quarter: 13–13, 19–23, 14–25, 11–20

Švyturys Arena, Klaipėda

=== 5th place match ===
6 August 2023
15:30

Boxscore

Portugal	64–75	Italy
Scoring by quarter: 14–18, 6–23, 21–15, 23–19

Švyturys Arena, Klaipėda

=== Championship semifinals ===
5 August 2023
18:00

Boxscore

Spain	47–75	France
Scoring by quarter: 4–15, 19–20, 11–15, 13–25

Švyturys Arena, Klaipėda

5 August 2023
20:30

Boxscore

Serbia	53–56	Latvia
Scoring by quarter: 26–13, 8–15, 13–15, 6–13

Švyturys Arena, Klaipėda

=== 3rd place match ===
6 August 2023
18:00

Boxscore

Serbia	36–94	Spain
Scoring by quarter: 13–27, 7–22, 7–26, 9–19

Švyturys Arena, Klaipėda

=== Final ===
6 August 2023
20:30

Boxscore

Latvia	59–85	France
Scoring by quarter: 11–29, 13–18, 19–18, 16–20

Švyturys Arena, Klaipėda

== Final standings ==
Rank	Team	Record
1st place, gold medalist(s)	France	7–0
2nd place, silver medalist(s)	Latvia	5–2
3rd place, bronze medalist(s)	Spain	6–1
4	Serbia	4–3
5	Italy	5–2
6	Portugal	3–4
7	Israel	4–3
8	Turkey	2–5
9	Finland	4–3
10	Hungary	4–3
11	Poland	3–4
12	Montenegro	2–5
13	Sweden	3–4
14	Czech Republic	2–5
15	Belgium	2–5
16	Lithuania	0–7

Relegated to the 2024 FIBA U20 Women's EuroBasket Division B

== See also ==
- 2023 FIBA U20 Women's European Championship Division B
