= Italy women's national under-20 basketball team =

National basketball team of Italy

Italy
- FIBA zone: FIBA Europe
- National federation: Italian Basketball Federation

U20 EuroBasket
- Appearances: 22
- Medals: (gold) Gold: 1 (2019); (silver) Silver: 2 (2013, 2016); (bronze) Bronze: 4 (2014, 2022, 2024, 2025)

The Italy women's national under-20 basketball team is a national basketball team of Italy, administered by the Italian Basketball Federation. It represents the country in international under-20 women's basketball competitions.

== FIBA U20 Women's EuroBasket participations ==
Year	Result in Division A
2000	11th
2002	11th
2004	12th
2005	6th
2006	9th
2007	6th
2008	9th
2009	9th
2010	12th
2011	7th
2012	13th

Year	Result in Division A
2013	2nd place, silver medalist(s)
2014	3rd place, bronze medalist(s)
2015	5th
2016	2nd place, silver medalist(s)
2017	6th
2018	4th
2019	1st place, gold medalist(s)
2022	3rd place, bronze medalist(s)
2023	5th
2024	3rd place, bronze medalist(s)
2025	3rd place, bronze medalist(s)

== See also ==
- Italy women's national basketball team
- Italy women's national under-19 basketball team
- Italy men's national under-20 basketball team
