= 2008 FIBA Europe Under-20 Championship for Women =

2008 FIBA U20 Women's European Championship
7th FIBA Under-20 Women's European Basketball Championship

Tournament details
- Host country: Italy
- Dates: 11–20 July 2008
- Teams: 16 (from 1 federation)
- Venues: 3 (in 3 host cities)

Final positions
- Champions: Russia (4th title)

The 2008 FIBA Europe Under-20 Championship for Women was the seventh edition of the Women's European basketball championship for national under-20 teams. It was held in Chieti, Sulmona and Pescara, Italy, from 11 to 20 July 2008. Russia women's national under-20 basketball team won the tournament and became the European champions for the fourth time.

== Participating teams ==
- Belarus
- Belgium
- Bulgaria
- Czech Republic
- France
- Germany
- Greece
- Italy
- Latvia
- Lithuania ▲ (Winners, 2007 FIBA Europe Under-20 Championship for Women Division B)
- Montenegro ▲ (Runners-up, 2007 FIBA Europe Under-20 Championship for Women Division B)
- Russia
- Serbia
- Spain
- Turkey
- Ukraine

== First round ==
In the first round, the teams were drawn into four groups of four. The first three teams from each group advance to the quarterfinal round, the last teams will play in the classification round for 13th–16th place.

=== Group A ===
Pos	Team	Pld	W	L	PF	PA	PD	Pts	Qualification
1	Serbia	3	2	1	204	163	+41	5	Quarterfinal round
2	France	3	2	1	201	175	+26	5	Quarterfinal round
3	Italy	3	2	1	177	177	0	5	Quarterfinal round
4	Germany	3	0	3	158	225	−67	3	Classification round for 13th–16th place

Source: FIBA Archive

11 July 2008

Boxscore

Serbia	74–44	Germany

11 July 2008

Boxscore

France	51–57	Italy

12 July 2008

Boxscore

Italy	53–71	Serbia

12 July 2008

Boxscore

Germany	59–84	France

13 July 2008

Boxscore

Serbia	59–66	France

13 July 2008

Boxscore

Italy	67–55	Germany

=== Group B ===
Pos	Team	Pld	W	L	PF	PA	PD	Pts	Qualification
1	Turkey	3	2	1	216	179	+37	5	Quarterfinal round
2	Latvia	3	2	1	190	190	0	5	Quarterfinal round
3	Czech Republic	3	2	1	187	190	−3	5	Quarterfinal round
4	Greece	3	0	3	152	186	−34	3	Classification round for 13th–16th place

Source: FIBA Archive

11 July 2008

Boxscore

Czech Republic	66–56	Greece

11 July 2008

Boxscore

Turkey	75–77	Latvia

12 July 2008

Boxscore

Latvia	56–65	Czech Republic

12 July 2008

Boxscore

Greece	46–63	Turkey

13 July 2008

Boxscore

Czech Republic	56–78	Turkey

13 July 2008

Boxscore

Latvia	57–50	Greece

=== Group C ===
Pos	Team	Pld	W	L	PF	PA	PD	Pts	Qualification
1	Russia	3	3	0	202	140	+62	6	Quarterfinal round
2	Ukraine	3	2	1	247	171	+76	5	Quarterfinal round
3	Lithuania	3	1	2	147	220	−73	4	Quarterfinal round
4	Bulgaria	3	0	3	171	236	−65	3	Classification round for 13th–16th place

Source: FIBA Archive

11 July 2008

Boxscore

Lithuania	32–59	Russia

11 July 2008

Boxscore

Bulgaria	61–88	Ukraine

12 July 2008

Boxscore

Ukraine	101–50	Lithuania

12 July 2008

Boxscore

Russia	83–50	Bulgaria

13 July 2008

Boxscore

Lithuania	65–60	Bulgaria

13 July 2008

Boxscore

Ukraine	58–60	Russia

=== Group D ===
Pos	Team	Pld	W	L	PF	PA	PD	Pts	Qualification
1	Spain	3	3	0	240	180	+60	6	Quarterfinal round
2	Belarus	3	2	1	201	201	0	5	Quarterfinal round
3	Montenegro	3	1	2	217	233	−16	4	Quarterfinal round
4	Belgium	3	0	3	211	255	−44	3	Classification round for 13th–16th place

Source: FIBA Archive

11 July 2008

Boxscore

Spain	90–61	Belgium

11 July 2008

Boxscore

Belarus	70–64	Montenegro

12 July 2008

Boxscore

Montenegro	61–80	Spain

12 July 2008

Boxscore

Belgium	67–73	Belarus

13 July 2008

Boxscore

Spain	70–58	Belarus

13 July 2008

Boxscore

Montenegro	92–83	Belgium

== Quarterfinal round ==
In this round, the teams play in two groups of six. The first two teams from each group advance to the semifinals, the third and fourth teams advance to the 5th–8th place playoffs, the other teams will play in the 9th–12th place playoffs.

=== Group E ===
Pos	Team	Pld	W	L	PF	PA	PD	Pts	Qualification
1	France	5	4	1	311	291	+20	9	Semifinals
2	Serbia	5	4	1	349	288	+61	9	Semifinals
3	Latvia	5	2	3	320	326	−6	7	5th–8th place playoffs
4	Turkey	5	2	3	333	334	−1	7	5th–8th place playoffs
5	Italy	5	2	3	307	332	−25	7	9th–12th place playoffs
6	Czech Republic	5	1	4	308	357	−49	6	9th–12th place playoffs

Source: FIBA Archive

15 July 2008

Boxscore

Latvia	53–57	France

15 July 2008

Boxscore

Czech Republic	54–71	Serbia

15 July 2008

Boxscore

Italy	49–65	Turkey

16 July 2008

Boxscore

Czech Republic	68–80	Italy

16 July 2008

Boxscore

Serbia	61–57	Latvia

16 July 2008

Boxscore

France	65–57	Turkey

17 July 2008

Boxscore

Latvia	77–68	Italy

17 July 2008

Boxscore

France	72–65	Czech Republic

17 July 2008

Boxscore

Turkey	58–87	Serbia

=== Group F ===
Pos	Team	Pld	W	L	PF	PA	PD	Pts	Qualification
1	Russia	5	5	0	365	262	+103	10	Semifinals
2	Spain	5	4	1	361	300	+61	9	Semifinals
3	Ukraine	5	2	3	364	312	+52	7	5th–8th place playoffs
4	Lithuania	5	2	3	317	320	−3	7	5th–8th place playoffs
5	Belarus	5	2	3	280	357	−77	7	9th–12th place playoffs
6	Montenegro	5	0	5	296	432	−136	5	9th–12th place playoffs

Source: FIBA Archive

15 July 2008

Boxscore

Belarus	56–52	Ukraine

15 July 2008

Boxscore

Montenegro	58–88	Russia

15 July 2008

Boxscore

Lithuania	54–66	Spain

16 July 2008

Boxscore

Montenegro	48–100	Lithuania

16 July 2008

Boxscore

Russia	90–50	Belarus

16 July 2008

Boxscore

Ukraine	59–81	Spain

17 July 2008

Boxscore

Belarus	46–81	Lithuania

17 July 2008

Boxscore

Ukraine	94–65	Montenegro

17 July 2008

Boxscore

Spain	64–68	Russia

== Classification round for 13th–16th place ==
=== Group G ===
Pos	Team	Pld	W	L	PF	PA	PD	Pts
13	Germany	3	3	0	208	185	+23	6
14	Bulgaria	3	2	1	201	186	+15	5
15	Belgium	3	1	2	185	191	−6	4
16	Greece	3	0	3	150	182	−32	3

Source: FIBA Archive

15 July 2008

Boxscore

Germany	66–62	Belgium

15 July 2008

Boxscore

Greece	44–59	Bulgaria

17 July 2008

Boxscore

Bulgaria	68–74	Germany

17 July 2008

Boxscore

Belgium	55–51	Greece

19 July 2008

Boxscore

Germany	68–55	Greece

19 July 2008

Boxscore

Bulgaria	74–68	Belgium

== 9th–12th place playoffs ==
9th–12th place semifinals
E5	Italy	73
F6	Montenegro	51
F5	Belarus	69
E6	Czech Republic	78

9th place match
E5	Italy	69
E6	Czech Republic	67
11th place match
F6	Montenegro	73
F5	Belarus	67

=== 9th–12th place semifinals ===
19 July 2008

Boxscore

Italy	73–51	Montenegro

19 July 2008

Boxscore

Belarus	69–78	Czech Republic

=== 11th place match ===
20 July 2008

Boxscore

Montenegro	73–67	Belarus

=== 9th place match ===
20 July 2008

Boxscore

Italy	69–67	Czech Republic

== 5th–8th place playoffs ==
5th–8th place semifinals
E3	Latvia	83
F4	Lithuania	73
F3	Ukraine	78
E4	Turkey	67

5th place match
E3	Latvia	59
F3	Ukraine	80
7th place match
F4	Lithuania	66
E4	Turkey	69

=== 5th–8th place semifinals ===
19 July 2008

Boxscore

Latvia	83–73	Lithuania

19 July 2008

Boxscore

Ukraine	78–67	Turkey

=== 7th place match ===
20 July 2008

Boxscore

Lithuania	66–69	Turkey

=== 5th place match ===
20 July 2008

Boxscore

Latvia	59–80	Ukraine

== Championship playoffs ==
Semifinals
E1	France	61
F2	Spain	56
F1	Russia	49
E2	Serbia	47

Finals
E1	France	58
F1	Russia	67
3rd place match
F2	Spain	46
E2	Serbia	73

=== Semifinals ===
19 July 2008

Boxscore

France	61–56	Spain

19 July 2008

Boxscore

Russia	49–47	Serbia

=== 3rd place match ===
20 July 2008

Boxscore

Spain	46–73	Serbia

=== Final ===
20 July 2008

Boxscore

France	58–67	Russia

== Final standings ==
Team relegated to the 2009 FIBA Europe Under-20 Championship for Women Division B

Rank	Team
1st place, gold medalist(s)	Russia
2nd place, silver medalist(s)	France
3rd place, bronze medalist(s)	Serbia
4	Spain
5	Ukraine
6	Latvia
7	Turkey
8	Lithuania
9	Italy
10	Czech Republic
11	Montenegro
12	Belarus
13	Germany
14	Bulgaria
15	Belgium
16	Greece
