= 2019 FIBA U20 Women's European Championship =

International basketball competition

18th FIBA Under-20 Women's European Basketball Championship

Tournament details
- Host country: Czech Republic
- Dates: 3–11 August 2019
- Teams: 16 (from 1 federation)
- Venues: 2 (in 1 host city)

Final positions
- Champions: Italy (1st title)

Tournament statistics
- MVP: (Italy) Sara Madera
- Top scorer: (Hungary) Czukor (16.1)
- Top rebounds: (Belgium) Massey (16.7)
- Top assists: (Spain) Ayuso (5.3)
- PPG (Team): (Spain) (72.7)
- RPG (Team): (France) (53.0)
- APG (Team): (Spain) (23.6)

Official website
- www.fiba.basketball

The 2019 FIBA U20 Women's European Championship was the 18th edition of the Women's European basketball championship for national under-20 teams. Held from 3 to 11 August in Klatovy, Czech Republic, 16 teams participated in the tournament.

== Venues ==
Klatovy		2019 FIBA U20 Women's European Championship is located in Czech Republic
Sport Hall Capkova	Arena ZS	2019 FIBA U20 Women's European Championship is located in Czech Republic
Capacity: 1,000	Capacity:	2019 FIBA U20 Women's European Championship is located in Czech Republic

== Participating teams ==
- Belgium
- Belarus ▲ (Runners-up, 2018 FIBA U20 Women's European Championship Division B)
- Czech Republic (hosts) ▲ (Winners, 2018 FIBA U20 Women's European Championship Division B)
- France
- Germany
- Hungary
- Italy
- Latvia
- Lithuania ▲ (3rd place, 2018 FIBA U20 Women's European Championship Division B)
- Netherlands
- Poland
- Portugal
- Russia
- Serbia
- Spain
- Sweden

== First round ==
The draw took place on 13 December 2018 in Belgrade, Serbia.

=== Group A ===
Pos	Team	Pld	W	L	PF	PA	PD	Pts
1	Spain	3	3	0	207	135	+72	6
2	Serbia	3	2	1	179	175	+4	5
3	Portugal	3	1	2	141	184	−43	4
4	Latvia	3	0	3	143	176	−33	3

Source: FIBA

3 August
13:30

Boxscore

Portugal	34–75	Spain
Scoring by quarter: 10–15, 9–18, 9–18, 6–24
Pts: Cabral 9 Rebs: Silva 7 Asts: Jordao 2		Pts: Ayuso 14; Rebs: Mbulito 11; Asts: Artiga 4

Sport Hall Capkova, Klatovy
Referees:
Özlem Yalman (TUR)
Paulina Gajdosz (POL)
Simon Unsworth (GBR)

3 August
18:00

Boxscore

Serbia	61–51	Latvia
Scoring by quarter: 16–16, 20–11, 9–15, 16–9
Pts: Đorđević 20; Rebs: Đorđević 6 Asts: Katanić 9		Pts: Gulbe 18; Rebs: Gulbe 8 Asts: Ozola 3

Sport Hall Capkova, Klatovy
Referees:
Alessandro Martolini (ITA)
Christina Manoli (FRA)
Dumitru Stasiev (MDA)

4 August
13:00

Boxscore

Spain	70–60	Serbia
Scoring by quarter: 20–21, 14–9, 19–10, 17–20
Pts: Carrera 22; Rebs: Carrera 9 Asts: Ayuso 8		Pts: Katanić 13; Rebs: Katanić 9 Asts: Katanić 3

Arena ZS, Klatovy

4 August
20:15

Boxscore

Latvia	51–53 (OT)	Portugal
Scoring by quarter: 6–22, 13–6, 19–12, 8–6, Overtime: 5–7
Pts: Gulbe 15; Rebs: Rozentāle 14; Asts: Steinharde 4		Pts: Cabral 15; Rebs: Jordao 10; Asts: Cabral 3

Arena ZS, Klatovy

5 August
15:45

Boxscore

Serbia	58–54	Portugal
Pts: Turudić 27; Rebs: Turudić 11; Asts: Katanić 4		Pts: Silva 20; Rebs: Jordao 11; Asts: Santos 4

Sport Hall Capkova, Klatovy

5 August
18:00

Boxscore

Spain	62–41	Latvia
Scoring by quarter: 19–10, 19–11, 17–9, 7–11
Pts: Castedo 16; Rebs: Artiga 6 Asts: Ayuso 5		Pts: Čumika 12; Rebs: Gulbe, Mauriņa 8 Asts: Miķelsone, Zeidaka 2

Sport Hall Capkova, Klatovy

=== Group B ===
Pos	Team	Pld	W	L	PF	PA	PD	Pts
1	Belgium	3	3	0	210	169	+41	6
2	Hungary	3	2	1	202	161	+41	5
3	Lithuania	3	1	2	148	176	−28	4
4	Belarus	3	0	3	163	217	−54	3

Source: FIBA

3 August
13:00

Boxscore

Belarus	50–82	Hungary
Scoring by quarter: 14–17, 9–26, 15–25, 12–14
Pts: Masko 17; Rebs: Karpuk 5 Asts: Masko 4		Pts: Czukor 15; Rebs: Czukor 7 Asts: Pusztai 5

Arena ZS, Klatovy
Referees:
Jelena Tomić (CRO)
Bert van Slooten (NED)
Veronika Vávrová (CZE)

3 August
20:15

Boxscore

Belgium	66–46	Lithuania
Scoring by quarter: 16–5, 18–16, 11–16, 21–9
Pts: Devos 25; Rebs: Massey 14; Asts: Leblon 6		Pts: Šegždaitė 14; Rebs: Šegždaitė 9 Asts: Donskichytė 4

Sport Hall Capkova, Klatovy
Referees:
Kerem Baki (TUR)
Stanislav Valeev (RUS)
Blazo Begenisic (SWE)

4 August
15:45

Boxscore

Lithuania	55–48	Belarus
Scoring by quarter: 13–10, 14–4, 8–13, 20–21
Pts: Serkevičiūtė 16; Rebs: Sakevičiūtė 10; Asts: Miknaitė 3		Pts: Mikhnevich 12; Rebs: Masko 8 Asts: Karpuk 3

Sport Hall Capkova, Klatovy

4 August
20:15

Boxscore

Hungary	58–64	Belgium
Scoring by quarter: 13–12, 10–20, 14–7, 21–25
Pts: Czukor 22; Rebs: Czukor 5 Asts: Tóth 4		Pts: Massey 20; Rebs: Massey 23; Asts: Leblon 7

Sport Hall Capkova, Klatovy

5 August
15:15

Boxscore

Belgium	80–65	Belarus
Scoring by quarter: 28–10, 10–18, 15–19, 27–18
Pts: Devos 24; Rebs: Devos 11; Asts: Peeters 5		Pts: Masko 21; Rebs: Bachkarova 7 Asts: Masko 3

Arena ZS, Klatovy

5 August
20:15

Boxscore

Hungary	62–47	Lithuania
Scoring by quarter: 10–16, 15–6, 17–12, 20–13
Pts: Pusztai 26; Rebs: Czukor 7 Asts: Tenyér 3		Pts: Zabotkaitė; Rebs: Miknaitė 7 Asts: Sakevičiūtė 4

Arena ZS, Klatovy

=== Group C ===
Pos	Team	Pld	W	L	PF	PA	PD	Pts
1	Russia	3	3	0	182	139	+43	6
2	Czech Republic (H)	3	2	1	188	146	+42	5
3	Poland	3	1	2	142	159	−17	4
4	Sweden	3	0	3	130	198	−68	3

Source: FIBA
(H) Hosts

3 August
15:45

Boxscore

Poland	58–30	Sweden
Scoring by quarter: 14–17, 16–2, 18–5, 10–6
Pts: Matkowska 11; Rebs: Trzeciak 9 Asts: Wojtala 5		Pts: Visscher 11; Rebs: Haegerstrand 6 Asts: Paulsson Glantz, Persson 2

Sport Hall Capkova, Klatovy
Referees:
Esperanza Mendoza (ESP)
Ciprian Stoica (ROM)
Péter Praksch (HUN)

3 August
18:00

Boxscore

Czech Republic	43–58	Russia
Scoring by quarter: 8–16, 13–7, 12–21, 10–14
Pts: Brabencová 14; Rebs: Voráčková 10; Asts: Sklenářová, Voráčková 3		Pts: Zotkina 14; Rebs: Kozhukhar 10; Asts: Ogun 2

Arena ZS, Klatovy
Referees:
Jasmina Juras (SRB)
Serkan Emlek (TUR)
Tom Dehondt (BEL)

4 August
13:30

Boxscore

Russia	65–43	Poland
Scoring by quarter: 18–17, 19–11, 13–8, 15–7
Pts: Ogun, Zaitceva 14; Rebs: Ogun 11; Asts: Repnikova 6		Pts: Grabska 9 Rebs: Winkowska 10; Asts: Trzeciak 3

Sport Hall Capkova, Klatovy

4 August
18:00

Boxscore

Sweden	47–81	Czech Republic
Scoring by quarter: 8–22, 11–22, 12–22, 16–15
Pts: Hjern 9 Rebs: Holmberg 7 Asts: Elias 5		Pts: Vitulová 19; Rebs: Vitulová 7 Asts: Pospíšilová 8

Arena ZS, Klatovy

5 August
13:00

Boxscore

Sweden	53–59	Russia
Scoring by quarter: 19–10, 16–12, 11–20, 7–17
Pts: Haegerstrand 14; Rebs: Haegerstrand 5 Asts: Hahne 3		Pts: Repnikova 14; Rebs: Zotkina 7 Asts: Matveeva, Ogun 3

Arena ZS, Klatovy

5 August
18:00

Boxscore

Czech Republic	64–41	Poland
Scoring by quarter: 10.12, 19–7, 10–8, 25–14
Pts: Vitulová 13; Rebs: Voráčková 9 Asts: Voráčková 7		Pts: Leszczyńska 14; Rebs: Banaszak 7 Asts: Banaszak, Matkowska 1

Arena ZS, Klatovy

=== Group D ===
Pos	Team	Pld	W	L	PF	PA	PD	Pts
1	France	3	3	0	215	119	+96	6
2	Netherlands	3	2	1	180	217	−37	5
3	Italy	3	1	2	180	160	+20	4
4	Germany	3	0	3	142	221	−79	3

Source: FIBA

3 August
15:15

Boxscore

Netherlands	75–72	Italy
Scoring by quarter: 22–10, 21–27, 12–14, 20–21
Pts: Fleuren 21; Rebs: Schipholt 7 Asts: Driessen 5		Pts: Fassina 20; Rebs: Fassina 11; Asts: Del Pero 4

Arena ZS, Klatovy
Referees:
Gatis Saliņš (LAT)
Alakbar Hasanov (AZE)
Jelena Smiljanić (SRB)

3 August
20:15

Boxscore

France	77–50	Germany
Scoring by quarter: 21–12, 12–8, 24–14, 20–16
Pts: Pouye 22; Rebs: Tahane 9 Asts: Jakovljevic 4		Pts: Geiselsöder 20; Rebs: Furman 6 Asts: Perner 2

Arena ZS, Klatovy
Referees:
Kristaps Konstantinovs (LAT)
Ivana Ivanović (SRB)
Lizaveta Famina (BLR)

4 August
15:15

Boxscore

Germany	59–70	Netherlands
Scoring by quarter: 13–20, 22–21, 8–19, 16–10
Pts: Schinkel 13; Rebs: Brennecke 6 Asts: Eichmeyer 4		Pts: Driessen 27; Rebs: Schipholt 9 Asts: Driessen 6

Arena ZS, Klatovy

4 August
18:00

Boxscore

Italy	34–52	France
Scoring by quarter: 15–16, 8–12, 8–15, 3–9
Pts: Madera 13; Rebs: Madera 7 Asts: Fassina 3		Pts: Bremaud 10; Rebs: Tahane 12; Asts: Gnago 5

Sport Hall Capkova, Klatovy

5 August
13:30

Boxscore

Italy	74–33	Germany
Scoring by quarter: 23–3, 18–6, 16–13, 17–11
Pts: Verona 19; Rebs: Madera 12; Asts: Ianezic 4		Pts: Geiselsöder 10; Rebs: Geiselsöder 8 Asts: Eckerle 3

Sport Hall Capkova, Klatovy

5 August
20:15

Boxscore

France	86–35	Netherlands
Scoring by quarter: 17–8, 26–9, 23–12, 20–6
Pts: Pouye 22; Rebs: Manala 12; Asts: Jakovljevic 4		Pts: Kuijt 14; Rebs: Droste 4 Asts: Fleuren 3

Sport Hall Capkova, Klatovy

== Knockout stage ==
=== Championship bracket ===
Round of 16
7 August
Spain	86
Belarus	55
7 August
Czech Republic	59
Italy	64
7 August
Hungary	65
Portugal	53
7 August
France	53
Sweden	31
7 August
Serbia	66
Lithuania	62
7 August
Russia	53
Germany	47
7 August
Belgium	48
Latvia	42
7 August
Netherlands	48
Poland	59

Quarter-finals
8 August
Spain	62
Italy	71
8 August
Hungary	33
France	76
8 August
Serbia	51
Russia	64
8 August
Belgium	72
Poland	54

Semi-finals
10 August
Italy	56
France	43
10 August
Russia	51
Belgium	50

Final
11 August
Italy	70
Russia	67
3rd place game
11 August
France	50
Belgium	34

=== 5th place bracket ===
5th–8th place semifinals
10 August
Spain	80
Hungary	66
10 August
Serbia	70
Poland	47

5th place game
11 August
Spain	74
Serbia	55
7th place game
11 August
Hungary	50
Poland	51

=== 9th place bracket ===
9th–16th place quarterfinals
8 August
Belarus	48
Czech Republic	78
8 August
Portugal	55
Sweden	60
8 August
Lithuania	64
Germany	44
8 August
Latvia	57
Netherlands	52

9th–12th place semifinals
10 August
Czech Republic	74
Sweden	55
10 August
Lithuania	54
Latvia	67

9th place game
11 August
Czech Republic	51
Latvia	50
11th place game
11 August
Sweden	54
Lithuania	87

=== 13th place bracket ===
13th–16th place semifinals
10 August
Belarus	42
Portugal	82
10 August
Germany	56
Netherlands	67

13th place game
11 August
Portugal	56
Netherlands	60
15th place game
11 August
Belarus	65
Germany	45

=== Round of 16 ===
7 August 2019
13:00

Boxscore

Netherlands	48–59	Poland
Scoring by quarter: 18–9, 4–14, 17–14, 9–22
Pts: Kuijt 20; Rebs: Schipholt 15; Asts: Schipholt 4		Pts: Kuijt 20; Rebs: Leszczyńska 13; Asts: Wojtala 3

Arena ZS, Klatovy

7 August 2019
13:30

Boxscore

Russia	53–47	Germany
Scoring by quarter: 18–8, 14–12, 10–15, 11–12
Pts: Kozhukhar 12; Rebs: Zotkina 15; Asts: Stolyar 4		Pts: Schiffer 17; Rebs: Geiselsöder 13; Asts: Eckerle 5

Sport Hall Capkova, Klatovy

7 August 2019
15:15

Boxscore

Belgium	48–42	Latvia
Scoring by quarter: 17–5, 15–13, 8–12, 8–12
Pts: Massey 16; Rebs: Massey 13; Asts: Hambursin 5		Pts: Gulbe 10; Rebs: Rozentāle 11; Asts: Korenika 2

Arena ZS, Klatovy

7 August 2019
15:45

Boxscore

Serbia	66–62	Lithuania
Scoring by quarter: 18–13, 11–18, 16–12, 21–19
Pts: Đorđević 22; Rebs: Đorđević 11; Asts: Katanić 6		Pts: Šegždaitė 18; Rebs: Šegždaitė 10; Asts: Sakevičiūtė 5

Sport Hall Capkova, Klatovy

7 August 2019
18:00

Boxscore

Hungary	65–53	Portugal
Scoring by quarter: 24–14, 13–14, 14–10, 14–15
Pts: Czukor 23; Rebs: Revesz 7 Asts: Dul 8		Pts: Silva 12; Rebs: Silva 12; Asts: Cabral 4

Sport Hall Capkova, Klatovy

7 August 2019
18:00

Boxscore

Czech Republic	59–64	Italy
Scoring by quarter: 12–20, 28–16, 10–13, 9–15
Pts: Zilova 13; Rebs: Voráčková 6 Asts: Sotolova 5		Pts: Verona 18; Rebs: Trucco 11; Asts: Verona 3

Arena ZS, Klatovy

7 August 2019
20:15

Boxscore

Spain	86–55	Belarus
Scoring by quarter: 26–12, 23–20, 21–9, 16–14
Pts: Wone 14; Rebs: Carrera 9 Asts: Méndez 5		Pts: Masko 13; Rebs: Masko 7 Asts: Yalchyk 4

Arena ZS, Klatovy

7 August 2019
20:15

Boxscore

France	53–31	Sweden
Scoring by quarter: 11–8, 12–8, 12–7, 18–8
Pts: Gnago 16; Rebs: Gnago 8 Asts: Franchelin 3		Pts: Haegerstrand 10; Rebs: Haegerstrand 6 Asts: Uhrstrom 3

Sport Hall Capkova, Klatovy

=== 9th–16th place quarterfinals ===
8 August 2019
13:00

Boxscore

Lithuania	64–44	Germany
Scoring by quarter: 22–11, 16–6, 14–10, 12–17
Pts: Segždaite 20; Rebs: Sakeviciute 10; Asts: Zabotkaite 4		Pts: Perner 9 Rebs: Furman 9 Asts: Geiselsöder 3

Sport Hall Capkova, Klatovy

8 August 2019
15:45

Boxscore

Latvia	57–52	Netherlands
Scoring by quarter: 14–16, 7–8, 17–13, 19–15
Pts: Ozola 18; Rebs: Gulbe 13; Asts: Septe 5		Pts: Kuijt 11; Rebs: Schipholt 11; Asts: Driessen 5

Sport Hall Capkova, Klatovy

8 August 2019
18:00

Boxscore

Belarus	48–78	Czech Republic
Scoring by quarter: 12–22, 11–23, 13–18, 12–15
Pts: Masko 17; Rebs: Three players 5 Asts: Masko 3		Pts: Vorackova 14; Rebs: Tomancova 8 Asts: Vorackova 6

Sport Hall Capkova, Klatovy

8 August 2019
20:15

Boxscore

Portugal	55–60	Sweden
Scoring by quarter: 15–18, 11–7, 8–14, 21–21
Pts: Serranho 14; Rebs: Jordao 15; Asts: Guerreiro & Serranho 3		Pts: Visscher 13; Rebs: Hjern 10; Asts: Glantz & Hjern 4

Sport Hall Capkova, Klatovy

=== Quarterfinals ===
8 August 2019
13:00

Boxscore

Serbia	51–64	Russia
Scoring by quarter: 10–15, 7–15, 17–15, 17–19
Pts: Đorđević 11; Rebs: Katanić 7 Asts: Three players 2		Pts: Zotkina 15; Rebs: Zotkina 8 Asts: Zotkina 6

Arena ZS, Klatovy

8 August 2019
15:15

Boxscore

Belgium	72–54	Poland
Scoring by quarter: 15–14, 11–12, 26–18, 20–10
Pts: Massey 24; Rebs: Massey 16; Asts: Leblon 8		Pts: Grabska 16; Rebs: Winkowska 7 Asts: Grabska, Banaszak 2

Arena ZS, Klatovy

8 August 2019
18:00

Boxscore

Spain	62–71	Italy
Scoring by quarter: 23–18, 15–12, 13–24, 11–17
Pts: Carrera & Mbulito 13; Rebs: Aranaz 8 Asts: Ayuso & Aranaz 4		Pts: Fassina 22; Rebs: Verona 8 Asts: Verona 6

Arena ZS, Klatovy

8 August 2019
20:15

Boxscore

Hungary	33–76	France
Scoring by quarter: 14–28, 4–18, 13–16, 2–14
Pts: Three players 6 Rebs: Four players 3 Asts: Jahni 3		Pts: Tahane 17; Rebs: Trasi 12; Asts: Pouye 4

Arena ZS, Klatovy

=== 13th–16th place semifinals ===
10 August 2019
13:30

Boxscore

Belarus	42–82	Portugal
Scoring by quarter: 11–25, 9–18, 16–18, 6–21
Pts: Siamiletnikava 12; Rebs: Bachkarova 8 Asts: Petushkova 3		Pts: Guerreiro 17; Rebs: Jordao 10; Asts: Martins 12

Sport Hall Capkova, Klatovy

10 August 2019
15:45

Boxscore

Germany	56–67	Netherlands
Scoring by quarter: 18–17, 6–13, 12–19, 20–18
Pts: Geiselsöder 14; Rebs: Geiselsöder 9 Asts: Schiffer 4		Pts: Hordijk 17; Rebs: Droste 13; Asts: Hordijk 4

Sport Hall Capkova, Klatovy

=== 9th–12th place semifinals ===
10 August 2019
18:00

Boxscore

Czech Republic	74–55	Sweden
Scoring by quarter: 22–11, 15–16, 20–15, 17–13
Pts: Sipova 13; Rebs: Vorackova 7 Asts: Brabencova 4		Pts: Holmberg 11; Rebs: Haegerstrand 8 Asts: Elias 3

Sport Hall Capkova, Klatovy

10 August 2019
20:15

Boxscore

Lithuania	54–67	Latvia
Scoring by quarter: 10–17, 21–16, 17–18, 6–16
Pts: Sakevičiūtė 18; Rebs: Šegždaitė 9 Asts: Serkevičiūtė 7		Pts: Cumika 14; Rebs: Gulbe 10; Asts: Septe 5

Sport Hall Capkova, Klatovy

=== 5th–8th place semifinals ===
10 August 2019
13:00

Boxscore

Spain	80–66	Hungary
Scoring by quarter: 26–23, 15–16, 24–12, 15–15
Pts: Prieto 17; Rebs: Wone 10; Asts: Ayuso 12		Pts: Pusztai 22; Rebs: Kovacs 10; Asts: Dul 4

Arena ZS, Klatovy

10 August 2019
15:15

Boxscore

Serbia	70–47	Poland
Scoring by quarter: 17–12, 17–9, 21–10, 15–16
Pts: Đorđević 18; Rebs: Janković 9 Asts: Dimitrijević 7		Pts: Wojtala 8 Rebs: Trzeciak 7 Asts: Grabska 3

Arena ZS, Klatovy

=== Semifinals ===
10 August 2019
18:00

Boxscore

Russia	51–50	Belgium
Scoring by quarter: 17–12, 17–10, 8–16, 9–12
Pts: Zaitceva 12; Rebs: Ogun 12; Asts: Stolyar 4		Pts: Massey 13; Rebs: Massey 18; Asts: Hambursin 6

Arena ZS, Klatovy

10 August 2019
20:15

Boxscore

Italy	56–43	France
Scoring by quarter: 12–10, 15–12, 10–12, 19–9
Pts: Madera 15; Rebs: Madera 11; Asts: Orsili 3		Pts: Tahane 9 Rebs: Tahane 9 Asts: Pouye 3

Arena ZS, Klatovy

=== 15th place game ===
11 August 2019
10:45

Boxscore

Belarus	65–45	Germany
Scoring by quarter: 16–13, 21–12, 15–9, 13–11
Pts: Masko 16; Rebs: Bachkarova 9 Asts: Bachkarova 4		Pts: Geiselsöder 13; Rebs: Daub 6 Asts: Perner 4

Sport Hall Capkova, Klatovy

=== 13th place game ===
11 August 2019
15:15

Boxscore

Portugal	56–60	Netherlands
Scoring by quarter: 15–16, 19–16, 8–14, 14–14
Pts: Serranho 21; Rebs: Serranho 8 Asts: = Serranho 3		Pts: Kuijt 17; Rebs: Schipholt 15; Asts: Kuijt 6

Arena ZS, Klatovy

=== 11th place game ===
11 August 2019
15:15

Boxscore

Sweden	54–87	Lithuania
Scoring by quarter: 15–15, 10–28, 13–20, 16–24
Pts: Visscher 14; Rebs: Visscher 7 Asts: Visscher 4		Pts: Mikelionyte 13; Rebs: Mikelionyte 8 Asts: Serkeviciuté 8

Sport Hall Capkova, Klatovy

=== 9th place game ===
11 August 2019
13:00

Boxscore

Czech Republic	51–50	Latvia
Scoring by quarter: 21–11, 9–20, 13–12, 8–7
Pts: Sklenarova 15; Rebs: Sipova 5 Asts: Vorackova 3		Pts: Gulbe 20; Rebs: Gulbe 14; Asts: Ozola 3

Arena ZS, Klatovy

=== 7th place game ===
11 August 2019
17:30

Boxscore

Hungary	50–51	Poland
Scoring by quarter: 12–10, 11–13, 14–17, 13–11
Pts: Czukor 13; Rebs: Czukor 10; Asts: Czukor 3		Pts: Szydlowska 16; Rebs: Banaszak 13; Asts: Wojtala 5

Sport Hall Capkova, Klatovy

=== 5th place game ===
11 August 2019
13:00

Boxscore

Spain	74–55	Serbia
Scoring by quarter: 23–11, 15–11, 16–13, 20–20
Pts: Pendande 11; Rebs: Pendande 7 Asts: Mbulito 9		Pts: Tudurić 15; Rebs: Jelić 5 Asts: Dimitrijević 9

Sport Hall Capkova, Klatovy

=== 3rd place game ===
11 August 2019
18:00

Boxscore

France	50–34	Belgium
Scoring by quarter: 15–9, 4–8, 16–7, 15–10
Pts: Pouye 18; Rebs: Tahane 14; Asts: Jakovljevic, Tahane 3		Pts: Devos 10; Rebs: Massey 16; Asts: Devos, Peeters 2

Arena ZS, Klatovy

=== Final ===
11 August 2019
20:15

Boxscore

Italy	70–67	Russia
Scoring by quarter: 12–12, 22–20, 18–19, 18–16
Pts: Verona 25; Rebs: Verona 7 Asts: Verona 4		Pts: Kozhukhar 19; Rebs: Zaitceva 12; Asts: Stolyar 5

Arena ZS, Klatovy
Referees: Kerem Baki (TUR), Esperanza Mendoza Holgado (ESP), Péter Praksch (HUN)

== Final standings ==
Rank	Team	Record
1st place, gold medalist(s)	Italy	5–2
2nd place, silver medalist(s)	Russia	6–1
3rd place, bronze medalist(s)	France	6–1
4	Belgium	5–2
5	Spain	6–1
6	Serbia	4–3
7	Poland	3–4
8	Hungary	3–4
9	Czech Republic	5–2
10	Latvia	2–5
11	Lithuania	3–4
12	Sweden	1–6
13	Netherlands	4–3
14	Portugal	2–5
15	Belarus	1–6
16	Germany	0–7

Spared from relegation due to the exclusion of Russia
Relegated to the 2022 FIBA U20 Women's European Championship Division B

== Awards ==
Most Valuable Player
(Italy) Sara Madera

All-Tournament Team

- (Belgium) Billie Massey
- (Italy) Costanza Verona
- (Italy) Sara Madera (MVP)
- (France) Tima Pouye
- (Russia) Valentina Kozhukhar
