= 2007 FIBA Europe Under-20 Championship for Women Division B =

Tournament details
- Host country: Druskininkai
- City: Lithuania
- Dates: 13–22 July 2007
- Teams: 10 (from 1 confederation)
- Venue: 1 (in 1 host city)

Final positions
- Champions: Montenegro (1st title)
- Runners-up: Lithuania
- Third place: Great Britain

Official website
- www.fibaeurope.com

The 2007 FIBA Europe Under-20 Championship for Women Division B was the third edition of the Division B of the Women's European basketball championship for national under-20 teams. It was held in Druskininkai, Lithuania, from 13 to 22 July 2007. Montenegro women's national under-20 basketball team won the tournament.

== Participating teams ==
- Great Britain
- Ireland
- Lithuania
- Montenegro
- Netherlands
- Poland ▼ (15th place, 2006 FIBA Europe Under-20 Championship for Women Division A)
- Portugal
- Romania
- Sweden
- Switzerland

== First round ==
In the first round, the teams were drawn into two groups of five. The first four teams from each group advance to the quarterfinals, the last teams will play for the 9th place.

=== Group A ===
Pos	Team	Pld	W	L	PF	PA	PD	Pts	Qualification
1	Lithuania	4	3	1	306	270	+36	7	Quarterfinals
2	Great Britain	4	3	1	272	253	+19	7	Quarterfinals
3	Portugal	4	2	2	281	279	+2	6	Quarterfinals
4	Netherlands	4	2	2	274	281	−7	6	Quarterfinals
5	Switzerland	4	0	4	223	273	−50	4	9th place match

Source: FIBA Archive

13 July 2007

Boxscore

Lithuania	78–46	Switzerland

13 July 2007

Boxscore

Netherlands	72–81	Portugal

14 July 2007

Boxscore

Great Britain	69–58	Netherlands

14 July 2007

Boxscore

Portugal	80–84	Lithuania

15 July 2007

Boxscore

Switzerland	57–58	Portugal

15 July 2007

Boxscore

Lithuania	63–57	Great Britain

17 July 2007

Boxscore

Netherlands	87–81	Lithuania

17 July 2007

Boxscore

Great Britain	80–70	Switzerland

18 July 2007

Boxscore

Portugal	62–66	Great Britain

18 July 2007

Boxscore

Switzerland	50–57	Netherlands

=== Group B ===
Pos	Team	Pld	W	L	PF	PA	PD	Pts	Qualification
1	Montenegro	4	3	1	324	252	+72	7	Quarterfinals
2	Sweden	4	3	1	227	198	+29	7	Quarterfinals
3	Poland	4	3	1	239	215	+24	7	Quarterfinals
4	Romania	4	1	3	227	273	−46	5	Quarterfinals
5	Ireland	4	0	4	205	284	−79	4	9th place match

Source: FIBA Archive

13 July 2007

Boxscore

Poland	67–78	Montenegro

13 July 2007

Boxscore

Romania	71–63	Ireland

14 July 2007

Boxscore

Sweden	66–47	Romania

14 July 2007

Boxscore

Ireland	38–67	Poland

15 July 2007

Boxscore

Montenegro	96–64	Ireland

15 July 2007

Boxscore

Poland	53–49	Sweden

17 July 2007

Boxscore

Romania	50–52	Poland

17 July 2007

Boxscore

Sweden	62–58	Montenegro

18 July 2007

Boxscore

Ireland	40–50	Sweden

18 July 2007

Boxscore

Montenegro	92–59	Romania

== 9th place match ==
22 July 2007

Boxscore

Switzerland	65–55	Ireland

== Championship playoffs ==
Fifth place
B3	Poland	54
B2	Sweden	67
Seventh place
A4	Netherlands	99
B4	Romania	64

Consolation semifinals
A4	Netherlands	69
B3	Poland	82
B4	Romania	50
B2	Sweden	72

Quarterfinals
B1	Montenegro	70
A4	Netherlands	52
A2	Great Britain	76
B3	Poland	66
A1	Lithuania	79
B4	Romania	70
B2	Sweden	50
A3	Portugal	54

Semifinals
B1	Montenegro	69
A2	Great Britain	61
A1	Lithuania	78
A3	Portugal	58

Final
B1	Montenegro	83
A1	Lithuania	64
Third place
A2	Great Britain	79
A3	Portugal	73

=== Quarterfinals ===
20 July 2007

Boxscore

Great Britain	76–66	Poland

20 July 2007

Boxscore

Sweden	50–54	Portugal

20 July 2007

Boxscore

Lithuania	79–70	Romania

20 July 2007

Boxscore

Montenegro	70–52	Netherlands

=== 5th–8th place playoffs ===
21 July 2007

Boxscore

Poland	82–69	Netherlands

21 July 2007

Boxscore

Sweden	72–50	Romania

=== Semifinals ===
21 July 2007

Boxscore

Montenegro	69–61	Great Britain

21 July 2007

Boxscore

Lithuania	78–58	Portugal

=== 7th place match ===
22 July 2007

Boxscore

Netherlands	99–64	Romania

=== 5th place match ===
22 July 2007

Boxscore

Poland	54–67	Sweden

=== 3rd place match ===
22 July 2007

Boxscore

Great Britain	79–73	Portugal

=== Final ===
22 July 2007

Boxscore

Montenegro	83–64	Lithuania

== Final standings ==
Team promoted to the 2008 FIBA Europe Under-20 Championship for Women Division A

Rank	Team
1st place, gold medalist(s)	Montenegro
2nd place, silver medalist(s)	Lithuania
3rd place, bronze medalist(s)	Great Britain
4	Portugal
5	Sweden
6	Poland
7	Netherlands
8	Romania
9	Switzerland
10	Ireland
