= Montenegro women's national under-20 basketball team =

Montenegro
- FIBA zone: FIBA Europe
- National federation: Basketball Federation of Montenegro

U20 EuroBasket
- Appearances: 4
- Medals: None

U20 EuroBasket Division B
- Appearances: 4
- Medals: (gold) Gold: 2 (2007, 2022)

The Montenegro women's national under-20 basketball team is a national basketball team of Montenegro, administered by the Basketball Federation of Montenegro. It represents the country in women's international under-20 basketball competitions.

== FIBA U20 Women's EuroBasket participations ==
Year	Division A	Division B
2007		1st place, gold medalist(s)
2008	11th	
2009	16th	
2015		4th
2016		6th
2022		1st place, gold medalist(s)
2023	12th	
2024	13th	

== See also ==
- Montenegro women's national basketball team
- Montenegro women's national under-18 basketball team
- Montenegro men's national under-20 basketball team
