= 2009 FIBA Europe Under-20 Championship for Women =

2009 FIBA U20 Women's European Championship
8th FIBA Under-20 Women's European Basketball Championship

Tournament details
- Host country: Poland
- Dates: 9–19 July 2009
- Teams: 16 (from 1 confederation)
- Venues: 2 (in 1 host city)

Final positions
- Champions: France (2nd title)

Official website
- www.fibaeurope.com

The 2009 FIBA Europe Under-20 Championship for Women was the eighth edition of the Women's European basketball championship for national under-20 teams. It was held in Gdynia, Poland, from 9 to 19 July 2009. France women's national under-20 basketball team won the tournament and became the European champions for the second time.

== Participating teams ==
- Belarus
- Bulgaria
- Czech Republic
- France
- Germany
- Italy
- Latvia
- Lithuania
- Montenegro
- Poland ▲ (Runners-up, 2008 FIBA Europe Under-20 Championship for Women Division B)
- Russia
- Serbia
- Spain
- Sweden ▲ (Winners, 2008 FIBA Europe Under-20 Championship for Women Division B)
- Turkey
- Ukraine

== First round ==
In the first round, the teams were drawn into four groups of four. The first three teams from each group advance to the quarterfinal round, the last teams will play in the classification round for 13th–16th place.

=== Group A ===
Pos	Team	Pld	W	L	PF	PA	PD	Pts	Qualification
1	Spain	3	3	0	241	142	+99	6	Second round
2	Turkey	3	2	1	189	194	−5	5	Second round
3	Germany	3	1	2	177	219	−42	4	Second round
4	Ukraine	3	0	3	177	229	−52	3	Classification round for 13th–16th place

Source: FIBA Archive

9 July 2009

Boxscore

Turkey	50–76	Spain

9 July 2009

Boxscore

Ukraine	70–74	Germany

10 July 2009

Boxscore

Germany	59–69	Turkey

10 July 2009

Boxscore

Spain	85–48	Ukraine

11 July 2009

Boxscore

Turkey	70–59	Ukraine

11 July 2009

Boxscore

Germany	44–80	Spain

=== Group B ===
Pos	Team	Pld	W	L	PF	PA	PD	Pts	Qualification
1	Serbia	3	3	0	248	179	+69	6	Second round
2	Italy	3	2	1	218	188	+30	5	Second round
3	Bulgaria	3	1	2	171	216	−45	4	Second round
4	Montenegro	3	0	3	193	247	−54	3	Classification round for 13th–16th place

Source: FIBA Archive

9 July 2009

Boxscore

Bulgaria	48–91	Serbia

9 July 2009

Boxscore

Italy	91–64	Montenegro

10 July 2009

Boxscore

Montenegro	46–67	Bulgaria

10 July 2009

Boxscore

Serbia	68–48	Italy

11 July 2009

Boxscore

Bulgaria	56–79	Italy

11 July 2009

Boxscore

Montenegro	83–89	Serbia

=== Group C ===
Pos	Team	Pld	W	L	PF	PA	PD	Pts	Qualification
1	Latvia	3	3	0	238	191	+47	6	Second round
2	Poland	3	2	1	218	215	+3	5	Second round
3	Lithuania	3	1	2	208	215	−7	4	Second round
4	Czech Republic	3	0	3	169	212	−43	3	Classification round for 13th–16th place

Source: FIBA Archive

9 July 2009

Boxscore

Lithuania	70–73	Poland

9 July 2009

Boxscore

Czech Republic	53–67	Latvia

10 July 2009

Boxscore

Latvia	85–69	Lithuania

10 July 2009

Boxscore

Poland	76–59	Czech Republic

11 July 2009

Boxscore

Lithuania	69–57	Czech Republic

11 July 2009

Boxscore

Latvia	86–69	Poland

=== Group D ===
Pos	Team	Pld	W	L	PF	PA	PD	Pts	Qualification
1	France	3	3	0	227	155	+72	6	Second round
2	Russia	3	2	1	217	176	+41	5	Second round
3	Sweden	3	1	2	175	221	−46	4	Second round
4	Belarus	3	0	3	188	255	−67	3	Classification round for 13th–16th place

Source: FIBA Archive

9 July 2009

Boxscore

Sweden	43–81	Russia

9 July 2009

Boxscore

France	87–55	Belarus

10 July 2009

Boxscore

Belarus	70–72	Sweden

10 July 2009

Boxscore

Russia	40–70	France

11 July 2009

Boxscore

Sweden	60–70	France

11 July 2009

Boxscore

Belarus	63–96	Russia

== Second round ==
In the second round, the teams play in two groups of six. The first four teams from each group advance to the quarterfinals, the other teams will play in the 9th–12th place playoffs.

=== Group E ===
Pos	Team	Pld	W	L	PF	PA	PD	Pts	Qualification
1	Spain	5	5	0	408	265	+143	10	Quarterfinals
2	Serbia	5	4	1	386	309	+77	9	Quarterfinals
3	Germany	5	2	3	325	357	−32	7	Quarterfinals
4	Turkey	5	2	3	309	307	+2	7	Quarterfinals
5	Italy	5	2	3	292	323	−31	7	9th–12th place playoffs
6	Bulgaria	5	0	5	263	422	−159	5	9th–12th place playoffs

Source: FIBA Archive

13 July 2009

Boxscore

Italy	50–47	Turkey

13 July 2009

Boxscore

Bulgaria	38–89	Spain

13 July 2009

Boxscore

Germany	58–81	Serbia

14 July 2009

Boxscore

Bulgaria	71–87	Germany

14 July 2009

Boxscore

Spain	75–59	Italy

14 July 2009

Boxscore

Turkey	67–72	Serbia

15 July 2009

Boxscore

Italy	56–77	Germany

15 July 2009

Boxscore

Turkey	76–50	Bulgaria

15 July 2009

Boxscore

Serbia	74–88	Spain

=== Group F ===
Pos	Team	Pld	W	L	PF	PA	PD	Pts	Qualification
1	France	5	5	0	356	278	+78	10	Quarterfinals
2	Russia	5	4	1	346	297	+49	9	Quarterfinals
3	Latvia	5	3	2	390	353	+37	8	Quarterfinals
4	Poland	5	2	3	339	369	−30	7	Quarterfinals
5	Lithuania	5	1	4	333	386	−53	6	9th–12th place playoffs
6	Sweden	5	0	5	318	399	−81	5	9th–12th place playoffs

Source: FIBA Archive

13 July 2009

Boxscore

Russia	69–57	Poland

13 July 2009

Boxscore

Sweden	70–89	Latvia

13 July 2009

Boxscore

Lithuania	57–77	France

14 July 2009

Boxscore

Sweden	66–75	Lithuania

14 July 2009

Boxscore

Latvia	65–71	Russia

14 July 2009

Boxscore

Poland	56–65	France

15 July 2009

Boxscore

Russia	85–62	Lithuania

15 July 2009

Boxscore

Poland	84–79	Sweden

15 July 2009

Boxscore

France	74–65	Latvia

== Classification round for 13th–16th place ==
=== Group G ===
Pos	Team	Pld	W	L	PF	PA	PD	Pts
13	Ukraine	3	2	1	249	214	+35	5
14	Belarus	3	2	1	219	212	+7	5
15	Czech Republic	3	1	2	188	220	−32	4
16	Montenegro	3	1	2	194	204	−10	4

Source: FIBA Archive

13 July 2009

Boxscore

Ukraine	98–72	Belarus

13 July 2009

Boxscore

Montenegro	58–68	Czech Republic

15 July 2009

Boxscore

Czech Republic	74–88	Ukraine

15 July 2009

Boxscore

Belarus	73–68	Montenegro

17 July 2009

Boxscore

Ukraine	63–68	Montenegro

17 July 2009

Boxscore

Czech Republic	46–74	Belarus

== 9th–12th place playoffs ==
9th–12th place semifinals
E5	Italy	73
F6	Sweden	71
F5	Lithuania	73
E6	Bulgaria	85

9th place match
E5	Italy	92
E6	Bulgaria	82
11th place match
F6	Sweden	80
F5	Lithuania	76

=== 9th–12th place semifinals ===
17 July 2009

Boxscore

Italy	73–71	Sweden

17 July 2009

Boxscore

Lithuania	73–85	Bulgaria

=== 11th place match ===
19 July 2009

Boxscore

Sweden	80–76	Lithuania

=== 9th place match ===
19 July 2009

Boxscore

Italy	92–82	Bulgaria

== Championship playoffs ==
Fifth place
F4	Poland	77
E4	Turkey	71
Seventh place
E3	Germany	79
E2	Serbia	82

Consolation semifinals
F4	Poland	86
E3	Germany	66
E4	Turkey	72
E2	Serbia	66

Quarterfinals
E1	Spain	84
F4	Poland	55
F2	Russia	76
E3	Germany	47
F1	France	72
E4	Turkey	49
E2	Serbia	71
F3	Latvia	89

Semifinals
E1	Spain	67
F2	Russia	55
F1	France	73
F3	Latvia	58

Final
E1	Spain	52
F1	France	74
Third place
F2	Russia	75
F3	Latvia	78

=== Quarterfinals ===
17 July 2009

Boxscore

Spain	84–55	Poland

17 July 2009

Boxscore

Serbia	71–89	Latvia

17 July 2009

Boxscore

France	72–49	Turkey

17 July 2009

Boxscore

Russia	76–47	Germany

=== 5th–8th place playoffs ===
18 July 2009

Boxscore

Poland	86–66	Germany

18 July 2009

Boxscore

Turkey	72–66	Serbia

=== Semifinals ===
18 July 2009

Boxscore

Spain	67–55	Russia

18 July 2009

Boxscore

France	73–58	Latvia

=== 7th place match ===
19 July 2009

Boxscore

Germany	79–82	Serbia

=== 5th place match ===
19 July 2009

Boxscore

Poland	77–71	Turkey

=== 3rd place match ===
19 July 2009

Boxscore

Russia	75–78	Latvia

=== Final ===
19 July 2009

Boxscore

Spain	52–74	France

== Final standings ==
Team relegated to the 2010 FIBA Europe Under-20 Championship for Women Division B

Rank	Team
1st place, gold medalist(s)	France
2nd place, silver medalist(s)	Spain
3rd place, bronze medalist(s)	Latvia
4	Russia
5	Poland
6	Turkey
7	Serbia
8	Germany
9	Italy
10	Bulgaria
11	Sweden
12	Lithuania
13	Ukraine
14	Belarus
15	Czech Republic
16	Montenegro
