= Lithuania women's national under-20 basketball team =

National basketball team of Lithuania

Lithuania
- FIBA zone: FIBA Europe
- National federation: Lithuanian Basketball Federation

U20 EuroBasket
- Appearances: 12
- Medals: (silver) Silver: 1 (2025)

U20 EuroBasket Division B
- Appearances: 7
- Medals: (silver) Silver: 2 (2007, 2016); (bronze) Bronze: 2 (2005, 2018)

The Lithuania women's national under-20 basketball team is a national basketball team of Lithuania, administered by the Lithuanian Basketball Federation. It represents the country in international under-20 women's basketball competitions.

== FIBA U20 Women's EuroBasket participations ==
Year	Division A	Division B
2005		3rd place, bronze medalist(s)
2006		7th
2007		2nd place, silver medalist(s)
2008	8th	
2009	12th	
2010	6th	
2011	11th	
2012	9th	
2013	16th	
2014		4th

Year	Division A	Division B
2015		5th
2016		2nd place, silver medalist(s)
2017	14th	
2018		3rd place, bronze medalist(s)
2019	11th	
2022	12th	
2023	16th	
2024	10th	
2025	2nd place, silver medalist(s)	

== See also ==
- Lithuania women's national basketball team
- Lithuania women's national under-19 basketball team
- Lithuania men's national under-20 basketball team
