= Sweden women's national under-20 basketball team =

Youth basketball team representing Sweden

Sweden
- FIBA zone: FIBA Europe
- National federation: Swedish Basketball Federation

U20 EuroBasket
- Appearances: 13
- Medals: None

U20 EuroBasket Division B
- Appearances: 6
- Medals: (gold) Gold: 2 (2008, 2011); (bronze) Bronze: 1 (2015)

The Sweden women's national under-20 basketball team is a national basketball team of Sweden, administered by the Swedish Basketball Federation. It represents the country in international under-20 women's basketball competitions.

== FIBA U20 Women's EuroBasket participations ==
Year	Division A	Division B
2005		5th
2006		9th
2007		5th
2008		1st place, gold medalist(s)
2009	11th	
2010	15th	
2011		1st place, gold medalist(s)
2012	6th	
2013	13th	
2014	15th	

Year	Division A	Division B
2015		3rd place, bronze medalist(s)
2016	12th	
2017	11th	
2018	8th	
2019	12th	
2022	11th	
2023	13th	
2024	12th	
2025	4th	

== See also ==
- Sweden women's national basketball team
- Sweden women's national under-19 basketball team
- Sweden men's national under-20 basketball team
