= Veronika Voráčková =

Czech basketball player

Casademont Zaragoza
- Position: Shooting guard
- League: ŽBL

Personal information
- Born: June 21, 1999 (age 27) České Budějovice, Czech Republic
- Listed height: 188 cm (6 ft 2 in)

Career information
- Playing career: 2010–present

Career history
- ZVVZ USK Prague
- 2025–: Casademont Zaragoza

Career highlights
- EuroLeague Women champion (2025)

Veronika Voráčková (born June 21, 1999) is a Czech basketball player for Casademont Zaragoza and the Czech national team.

She participated at the EuroBasket Women 2017.

On May 25, 2025, she signed for Casademont Zaragoza of the Endesa women's league in Spain.
