= Belarus women's national under-20 basketball team =

Belarus
- FIBA zone: FIBA Europe
- National federation: Belarusian Basketball Federation

U20 European Championship
- Appearances: 9
- Medals: None

U20 European Championship Division B
- Appearances: 4
- Medals: Gold: 1 (2006); Silver: 1 (2018)

The Belarus women's national under-20 basketball team is a national basketball team of Belarus, administered by the Belarusian Basketball Federation. It represented the country in women's international under-20 basketball competitions.

After the 2022 Russian invasion of Ukraine, the FIBA suspended Belarus from participating in basketball and 3x3 basketball competitions.

== FIBA U20 Women's European Championship participations ==
Year	Division A	Division B
2006		1st place, gold medalist(s)
2007	11th	
2008	12th	
2009	14th	
2010	11th	
2011	14th	
2012	8th	

Year	Division A	Division B
2013	4th	
2014	14th	
2016		11th
2017		4th
2018		2nd place, silver medalist(s)
2019	15th	

== See also ==
- Belarus women's national basketball team
- Belarus women's national under-18 basketball team
