= France women's national under-20 basketball team =

Women's national basketball team France

France
- FIBA zone: FIBA Europe
- National federation: French Federation of Basketball

U21 World Championship
- Appearances: 2
- Medals: (bronze) Bronze: 2 (2003, 2007)

U20 EuroBasket
- Appearances: 21
- Medals: (gold) Gold: 5 (2005, 2009, 2014, 2023, 2024); (silver) Silver: 3 (2004, 2008, 2015); (bronze) Bronze: 4 (2002, 2006, 2007, 2019)

The France women's national under-20 basketball team is a national basketball team of France, administered by the French Federation of Basketball. It represents the country in under-20 women's international basketball competitions.

== FIBA U20 Women's EuroBasket participations ==
Year	Result in Division A
2002	3rd place, bronze medalist(s)
2004	2nd place, silver medalist(s)
2005	1st place, gold medalist(s)
2006	3rd place, bronze medalist(s)
2007	3rd place, bronze medalist(s)
2008	2nd place, silver medalist(s)
2009	1st place, gold medalist(s)
2010	4th
2011	5th
2012	5th
2013	5th

Year	Result in Division A
2014	1st place, gold medalist(s)
2015	2nd place, silver medalist(s)
2016	6th
2017	4th
2018	6th
2019	3rd place, bronze medalist(s)
2022	4th
2023	1st place, gold medalist(s)
2024	1st place, gold medalist(s)
2025	13th

== FIBA Under-21 World Championship for Women participations ==
Year	Result
2003	3rd place, bronze medalist(s)
2007	3rd place, bronze medalist(s)

== See also ==
- France women's national basketball team
- France women's national under-19 basketball team
- France men's national under-20 basketball team
