= Slovenia women's national under-20 basketball team =

Slovenia
- FIBA zone: FIBA Europe
- National federation: Basketball Federation of Slovenia

U20 EuroBasket
- Appearances: 4
- Medals: (silver) Silver: 1 (2017)

U20 EuroBasket Division B
- Appearances: 5
- Medals: (gold) Gold: 2 (2016, 2023)

The Slovenia women's national under-20 basketball team is a national basketball team of Slovenia, administered by the Basketball Federation of Slovenia. It represents the country in international under-20 women's basketball competitions.

== FIBA U20 Women's EuroBasket participations ==
Year	Division A	Division B
2005		4th
2006		5th
2016		1st place, gold medalist(s)
2017	2nd place, silver medalist(s)	
2018	14th	
2022		4th
2023		1st place, gold medalist(s)
2024	5th	
2025	12th	

== See also ==
- Slovenia women's national basketball team
- Slovenia women's national under-18 basketball team
- Slovenia men's national under-20 basketball team
