= 2021 FIBA U20 Women's European Challengers =

Tournament details
- Dates: 12–18 July 2021
- Teams: 28
- Venues: 5 (in 5 host cities)

Official website
- www.fiba.basketball

The 2021 FIBA U20 Women's European Challengers were international basketball competitions which took place from 12 to 18 July 2021, replacing the cancelled 2021 FIBA U20 Women's European Championship.

== History ==
The 2020 edition of FIBA U20 Women's European Championship was to be held in Sopron, Hungary but was postponed to 2021 due to COVID-19 pandemic. Since the pandemic continued in 2021, the FIBA Europe decided to hold alternative format of competition to replace traditional format of U20 Women's European Championship where 16 teams gather in one place.

== Structure ==
- The events are to be played on a voluntary participation basis, with promotion/relegation to be frozen across Divisions A, B and C.
- The Top 18 ranked teams (16 currently in Division A, plus two additional teams by 2019 ranking in respective category) to play three tournaments of six teams each (Groups A, B and C).
- All other registered teams, ranked 19 and lower, to play in tournaments of up to six teams each (Groups D and E).
- All tournaments to be played in Round Robin format, with groups to be created by "serpentine" style allocation, taking the hosting situation into consideration.

== Participating teams ==
Top-18 Challengers

- Belarus
- Belgium
- Bulgaria
- Croatia
- Czech Republic
- France
- Germany
- Hungary
- Ireland
- Israel
- Italy
- Latvia
- Poland
- Portugal
- Russia
- Serbia
- Spain
- Turkey

19–28 Challengers

- Albania
- Armenia
- Greece
- Kosovo
- Luxembourg
- North Macedonia
- Romania
- Slovakia
- Switzerland
- Ukraine

== Top-18 Challengers ==
=== Group A ===
The Group A tournament was played in Sofia, Bulgaria.

Pos	Team	Pld	W	L	PF	PA	PD	Pts
1	Italy	5	5	0	293	238	+55	10
2	Belgium	5	4	1	383	276	+107	9
3	Latvia	5	3	2	323	333	−10	8
4	Germany	5	2	3	291	282	+9	7
5	Croatia	5	1	4	277	312	−35	6
6	Bulgaria	5	0	5	260	386	−126	5

Source: FIBA

13 July 2021

Boxscore

Latvia	70–99	Belgium

13 July 2021

Boxscore

Croatia	45–47	Germany

13 July 2021

Boxscore

Bulgaria	46–66	Italy

14 July 2021

Boxscore

Germany	56–66	Latvia

14 July 2021

Boxscore

Italy	67–51	Croatia

14 July 2021

Boxscore

Belgium	89–53	Bulgaria

15 July 2021

Boxscore

Latvia	69–64	Croatia

15 July 2021

Boxscore

Belgium	48–54	Italy

15 July 2021

Boxscore

Bulgaria	51–77	Germany

17 July 2021

Boxscore

Germany	62–70	Belgium

17 July 2021

Boxscore

Italy	56–44	Latvia

17 July 2021

Boxscore

Croatia	80–52	Bulgaria

18 July 2021

Boxscore

Germany	49–50	Italy

18 July 2021

Boxscore

Belgium	77–37	Croatia

18 July 2021

Boxscore

Bulgaria	58–74	Latvia

=== Group B ===
The Group B tournament was played in Sopron, Hungary.

Pos	Team	Pld	W	L	PF	PA	PD	Pts
1	Hungary	5	4	1	352	273	+79	9
2	Serbia	5	3	2	329	306	+23	8
3	Czech Republic	5	3	2	394	357	+37	8
4	Spain	5	3	2	347	266	+81	8
5	Israel	5	2	3	325	281	+44	7
6	Ireland	5	0	5	201	465	−264	5

Source: FIBA

12 July 2021

Boxscore

Czech Republic	67–65	Israel

12 July 2021

Boxscore

Serbia	61–57	Spain

12 July 2021

Boxscore

Ireland	28–91	Hungary

13 July 2021

Boxscore

Spain	65–68	Czech Republic

13 July 2021

Boxscore

Israel	91–34	Ireland

13 July 2021

Boxscore

Hungary	61–56	Serbia

14 July 2021

Boxscore

Ireland	29–94	Spain

14 July 2021

Boxscore

Czech Republic	76–85	Serbia

14 July 2021

Boxscore

Israel	56–61	Hungary

16 July 2021

Boxscore

Spain	66–51	Israel

16 July 2021

Boxscore

Serbia	74–50	Ireland

16 July 2021

Boxscore

Hungary	82–68	Czech Republic

17 July 2021

Boxscore

Israel	62–53	Serbia

17 July 2021

Boxscore

Ireland	60–115	Czech Republic

17 July 2021

Boxscore

Spain	65–57	Hungary

=== Group C ===
The Group C tournament was played in Konya, Turkey.

Pos	Team	Pld	W	L	PF	PA	PD	Pts
1	France	5	5	0	379	270	+109	10
2	Poland	5	4	1	335	293	+42	9
3	Russia	5	3	2	374	335	+39	8
4	Turkey	5	2	3	317	316	+1	7
5	Belarus	5	1	4	285	366	−81	6
6	Portugal	5	0	5	261	371	−110	5

Source: FIBA

13 July 2021

Boxscore

Belarus	53–71	Poland

13 July 2021

Boxscore

Turkey	62–76	Russia

13 July 2021

Boxscore

Portugal	38–86	France

14 July 2021

Boxscore

Russia	88–60	Belarus

14 July 2021

Boxscore

France	74–54	Turkey

14 July 2021

Boxscore

Poland	86–51	Portugal

15 July 2021

Boxscore

Poland	54–71	France

15 July 2021

Boxscore

Belarus	59–83	Turkey

15 July 2021

Boxscore

Portugal	60–66	Russia

17 July 2021

Boxscore

Russia	70–75	Poland

17 July 2021

Boxscore

Turkey	70–58	Portugal

17 July 2021

Boxscore

France	70–50	Belarus

18 July 2021

Boxscore

Portugal	54–63	Belarus

18 July 2021

Boxscore

Poland	49–48	Turkey

18 July 2021

Boxscore

Russia	74–78	France

== 19–28 Challengers ==
=== Group D ===
The Group D tournament was played in Yerevan, Armenia.

Pos	Team	Pld	W	L	PF	PA	PD	Pts
1	Greece	4	4	0	328	219	+109	8
2	Switzerland	4	2	2	342	247	+95	6
3	Ukraine	4	2	2	286	275	+11	6
4	Albania	4	2	2	256	378	−122	6
5	Armenia	4	0	4	241	334	−93	4

Source: FIBA

13 July 2021

Boxscore

Albania	80–78	Ukraine

13 July 2021

Boxscore

Switzerland	88–51	Armenia

14 July 2021

Boxscore

Greece	112–45	Albania

14 July 2021

Boxscore

Ukraine	75–70	Switzerland

15 July 2021

Boxscore

Switzerland	68–69	Greece

15 July 2021

Boxscore

Armenia	66–79	Ukraine

17 July 2021

Boxscore

Albania	52–116	Switzerland

17 July 2021

Boxscore

Greece	88–52	Armenia

18 July 2021

Boxscore

Ukraine	54–59	Greece

18 July 2021

Boxscore

Armenia	72–79	Albania

=== Group E ===
The Group E tournament was played in Skopje, North Macedonia.

Pos	Team	Pld	W	L	PF	PA	PD	Pts
1	Slovakia	4	4	0	287	181	+106	8
2	Romania	4	3	1	283	252	+31	7
3	Luxembourg	4	2	2	276	252	+24	6
4	Kosovo	4	1	3	222	304	−82	5
5	North Macedonia	4	0	4	216	295	−79	4

Source: FIBA

13 July 2021

Boxscore

Slovakia	71–38	Kosovo

13 July 2021

Boxscore

North Macedonia	55–79	Luxembourg

14 July 2021

Boxscore

Luxembourg	47–67	Slovakia

14 July 2021

Boxscore

Romania	78–55	North Macedonia

15 July 2021

Boxscore

Kosovo	57–91	Luxembourg

15 July 2021

Boxscore

Slovakia	74–52	Romania

17 July 2021

Boxscore

Romania	80–64	Kosovo

17 July 2021

Boxscore

North Macedonia	44–75	Slovakia

18 July 2021

Boxscore

Luxembourg	59–73	Romania

18 July 2021

Boxscore

Kosovo	63–62	North Macedonia

== See also ==
- 2021 FIBA U20 European Challengers
- 2021 FIBA U18 European Challengers
- 2021 FIBA U16 European Challengers
- 2021 FIBA U18 Women's European Challengers
- 2021 FIBA U16 Women's European Challengers
