= 2026 FIBA U20 Women's EuroBasket =

International youth basketball tournament

Tournament details
- Host country: Lithuania
- Cities: Alytus; Klaipėda
- Dates: 4–12 July 2026
- Teams: 16 (from 1 confederation)
- Venues: 2 (in 2 host cities)

Final positions
- Champions: France (6th title)
- Runners-up: Israel
- Third place: Spain

Tournament statistics
- Games played: 56
- MVP: (France) Sarah Cissé
- Top scorer: (Israel) Gal Raviv (28.1 ppg)

Official website
- www.fiba.basketball

The 2026 FIBA U20 Women's EuroBasket was the 23rd edition of the European basketball championship for women's under-20 national teams. The tournament was played in Alytus and Klaipėda, Lithuania, from 4 to 12 July 2026.

France secured their sixth overall title with a victory over Israel in the final, 79–66.

== Participating teams ==
Team	App	Last	Streak	Best placement in the tournament	Prev
Teams maintained from the 2025 edition
Belgium	15th	2025	2	Fourth place (2019)	5th
France	22nd	2025	22	Champions (2005, 2009, 2014, 2023, 2024)	13th
Germany	17th	2025	3	Fourth place (2024)	9th
Iceland	2nd	2025	2	Eighth place (2025)	8th
Israel	6th	2025	4	Sixth place (2025)	6th
Italy	23rd	2025	23	Champions (2019)	3rd
Latvia	21st	2025	11	Runners-up (2023)	11th
Lithuania	13th	2025	6	Runners-up (2025)	2nd
Poland	20th	2025	16	Runners-up (2005)	10th
Slovenia	5th	2025	3	Runners-up (2017)	12th
Spain	23rd	2025	23	Champions (2007, 2011, 2012, 2013, 2015, 2016, 2017, 2018, 2022, 2025)	1st
Sweden	14th	2025	9	Fourth place (2025)	4th
Turkey	19th	2025	4	Third place (2012, 2013)	7th
Teams promoted from the 2025 Division B
Croatia	6th	2018	1	Fifth place (2005)	▲3rd, Div. B
Hungary	15th	2024	1	Runners-up (2006)	▲1st, Div. B
Serbia	17th	2024	1	Runners-up (2007, 2018)	▲2nd, Div. B

== First round ==
The draw of the first round was held on 5 February 2026 in Freising, Germany.

In the first round, the teams were drawn into four groups of four. All teams advanced to the playoffs.

All times are local (Eastern European Summer Time; UTC+3).

=== Group A ===
Pos	Team	Pld	W	L	PF	PA	PD	Pts
1	Spain	3	3	0	233	190	+43	6
2	Israel	3	2	1	227	224	+3	5
3	Lithuania (H)	3	1	2	229	215	+14	4
4	Croatia	3	0	3	204	264	−60	3

Source: FIBA
(H) Hosts

4 July 2026
15:30

Boxscore

Israel	66–68	Spain
Scoring by quarter: 20–18, 14–17, 19–11, 13–22
Pts: Raviv 33; Rebs: Zilbershlag 8 Asts: Raviv 4		Pts: four players 10; Rebs: Miguez 11; Asts: García 6

Gargždų Arena, Klaipėda
Attendance: 82
Referees: Ivana Ivanović (SRB), Nace Mohorič (SLO), Nikola Bejat (NOR)

4 July 2026
18:00

Boxscore

Lithuania	89–64	Croatia
Scoring by quarter: 18–11, 18–21, 24–17, 29–15
Pts: Paunksnytė 18; Rebs: Galvanauskaitė 10; Asts: Paunksnytė 5		Pts: Božan 20; Rebs: Božan 10; Asts: Božan 5

Gargždų Arena, Klaipėda
Attendance: 311
Referees: Polat Parlak (TUR), Megaklis-Konstantinos Marinakis (BUL), Monika Mincheva (BUL)

5 July 2026
13:00

Boxscore

Croatia	85–87	Israel
Scoring by quarter: 19–26, 18–14, 18–26, 30–21
Pts: Božan 26; Rebs: Božan 28; Asts: Kovačić, Bilić 5		Pts: Raviv 26; Rebs: Zilbershlag 7 Asts: Raviv 9

Gargždų Arena, Klaipėda
Attendance: 50
Referees: Polat Parlak (TUR), Tom De Lange (BEL), Monika Mincheva (BUL)

5 July 2026
18:00

Boxscore

Spain	77–69 (OT)	Lithuania
Scoring by quarter: 23–26, 16–14, 14–19, 14–8, Overtime: 10–2
Pts: Miguez 12; Rebs: Miguez 12; Asts: García 6		Pts: Paunksnytė 20; Rebs: Galvanauskaitė 11; Asts: Paunksnytė 6

Gargždų Arena, Klaipėda
Attendance: 732
Referees: Ivana Ivanović (SRB), Suzana Vujičić (MNE), Goran Grbić (SLO)

7 July 2026
15:30

Boxscore

Croatia	55–88	Spain
Scoring by quarter: 14–21, 14–21, 16–21, 11–25
Pts: Vukić 20; Rebs: Vukić 13; Asts: Bilić 3		Pts: Rodríguez 15; Rebs: Cargol 7 Asts: Cargol 7

Gargždų Arena, Klaipėda
Attendance: 52
Referees: Alessandro Perciavalle (ITA), Nikola Bejat (NOR), Bogna Podkowińska (POL)

7 July 2026
18:00

Boxscore

Israel	74–71	Lithuania
Scoring by quarter: 12–21, 17–14, 18–18, 27–18
Pts: Raviv 35; Rebs: Zimmel 12; Asts: Oren, Raviv 6		Pts: Aukštikalnytė 21; Rebs: Galvanauskaitė 13; Asts: Galvanauskaitė, Paunksnytė 4

Gargždų Arena, Klaipėda
Attendance: 353
Referees: Pierre Landy (FRA), Nace Mohorič (SLO), Tom De Lange (BEL)

=== Group B ===
Pos	Team	Pld	W	L	PF	PA	PD	Pts
1	Latvia	3	3	0	218	187	+31	6
2	Germany	3	2	1	196	164	+32	5
3	Hungary	3	1	2	178	201	−23	4
4	Sweden	3	0	3	166	206	−40	3

Source: FIBA

4 July 2026
13:00

Boxscore

Sweden	63–70	Latvia
Scoring by quarter: 17–23, 19–14, 8–17, 19–16
Pts: da Silva Costa 16; Rebs: Jägre 10; Asts: Jolinder 4		Pts: Luzgina 15; Rebs: Otto 13; Asts: three players 4

Gargždų Arena, Klaipėda
Attendance: 107
Referees: Suzana Vujičić (MNE), Alessandro Perciavalle (ITA), Tom De Lange (BEL)

4 July 2026
20:30

Boxscore

Germany	64–50	Hungary
Scoring by quarter: 18–12, 13–5, 10–16, 23–17
Pts: Ndi 15; Rebs: Englisch, Ndi 11; Asts: Bielefeld 4		Pts: Fárbás 13; Rebs: Fárbás 6 Asts: four players 2

Gargždų Arena, Klaipėda
Attendance: 84
Referees: Pierre Landy (FRA), Goran Grbić (SLO), Bogna Podkowińska (POL)

5 July 2026
15:30

Boxscore

Hungary	64–59	Sweden
Scoring by quarter: 12–13, 11–15, 18–13, 23–18
Pts: Drahos, Fárbás 13; Rebs: Fárbás 11; Asts: Janzsó, Toman 3		Pts: da Silva Costa 16; Rebs: da Silva Costa 9 Asts: Jolinder 6

Gargždų Arena, Klaipėda
Attendance: 61
Referees: Alessandro Percivalle (ITA), Megaklis-Konstantinos Marinakis (GRE), Nikola Bejat (NOR)

5 July 2026
20:30

Boxscore

Latvia	70–60	Germany
Scoring by quarter: 24–10, 17–20, 13–17, 16–13
Pts: Liepiņa 15; Rebs: Šmite 12; Asts: Luzgina 7		Pts: Koch 13; Rebs: Bielefeld, Englisch 7 Asts: Bielefeld 5

Gargždų Arena, Klaipėda
Attendance: 90
Referees: Pierre Landy (FRA), Nace Mohorič (SLO), Bogna Podkowińska (POL)

7 July 2026
13:00

Boxscore

Sweden	44–72	Germany
Scoring by quarter: 11–25, 9–22, 6–19, 18–16
Pts: Jolinder 14; Rebs: da Silva Costa 7 Asts: three players 2		Pts: Ndi 12; Rebs: Bielefeld 9 Asts: Bielefeld 7

Gargždų Arena, Klaipėda
Attendance: 100
Referees: Ivana Ivanović (SRB), Goran Grbić (SLO), Megaklis-Konstantinos Marinakis (BUL)

7 July 2026
20:30

Boxscore

Hungary	64–78	Latvia
Scoring by quarter: 14–21, 20–26, 18–11, 12–20
Pts: Drahos 18; Rebs: Fárbás, Toman 5 Asts: Fárbás 4		Pts: Luzgina 16; Rebs: Otto, Liepiņa 9 Asts: Šmite 7

Gargždų Arena, Klaipėda
Attendance: 100
Referees: Polat Parlak (TUR), Suzana Vujičić (MNE), Monika Mincheva (BUL)

=== Group C ===
Pos	Team	Pld	W	L	PF	PA	PD	Pts
1	Poland	3	3	0	235	164	+71	6
2	Iceland	3	2	1	231	239	−8	5
3	Italy	3	1	2	224	255	−31	4
4	Serbia	3	0	3	189	221	−32	3

Source: FIBA

4 July 2026
15:30

Boxscore

Poland	91–60	Italy
Scoring by quarter: 22–20, 17–17, 31–9, 21–14
Pts: Burliga 21; Rebs: Grządziela, Haegenbarth 7 Asts: Wysocka 6		Pts: Torresani 14; Rebs: Zuccon 8 Asts: Giacchetti, Trozzola 3

Alytus Arena, Alytus
Attendance: 100
Referees: Jelena Tomic (CRO), Sara Månsson (SWE), Or Zror (ISR)

4 July 2026
18:00

Boxscore

Serbia	74–78	Iceland
Scoring by quarter: 15–21, 23–17, 21–12, 15–28

Alytus Arena, Alytus

5 July 2026
13:00

Boxscore

Iceland	67–86	Poland
Scoring by quarter: 19–23, 16–23, 18–23, 14–17

Alytus Arena, Alytus

5 July 2026
15:30

Boxscore

Italy	85–78	Serbia
Scoring by quarter: 22–20, 20–15, 21–20, 22–23

Alytus Arena, Alytus

7 July 2026
18:00

Boxscore

Poland	58–37	Serbia
Scoring by quarter: 21–3, 14–20, 13–9, 10–5

Alytus Arena, Alytus

7 July 2026
20:30

Boxscore

Iceland	86–79	Italy
Scoring by quarter: 10–19, 20–15, 33–22, 23–23

Alytus Arena, Alytus

=== Group D ===
Pos	Team	Pld	W	L	PF	PA	PD	Pts
1	France	3	3	0	213	137	+76	6
2	Belgium	3	2	1	192	183	+9	5
3	Turkey	3	1	2	170	187	−17	4
4	Slovenia	3	0	3	124	192	−68	3

Source: FIBA

4 July 2026
13:00

Boxscore

Turkey	44–69	France
Scoring by quarter: 9–16, 8–19, 20–12, 7–22

Alytus Arena, Alytus

4 July 2026
20:30

Boxscore

Slovenia	45–60	Belgium
Scoring by quarter: 11–9, 4–17, 19–17, 11–17

Alytus Arena, Alytus

5 July 2026
18:00

Boxscore

Belgium	70–68	Turkey
Scoring by quarter: 18–20, 17–17, 21–13, 14–18

Alytus Arena, Alytus

5 July 2026
20:30

Boxscore

France	74–31	Slovenia
Scoring by quarter: 14–6, 20–15, 20–4, 20–6

Alytus Arena, Alytus

7 July 2026
13:00

Boxscore

Turkey	58–48	Slovenia
Scoring by quarter: 17–19, 15–11, 13–7, 13–11

Alytus Arena, Alytus

7 July 2026
15:30

Boxscore

Belgium	62–70	France
Scoring by quarter: 13–16, 13–16, 16–19, 20–19

Alytus Arena, Alytus

== Final round ==
=== Main bracket ===
Round of 16
A1 Spain	77
B4 Sweden	37
C2 Iceland	62
D3 Turkey	84
B2 Germany	69
A3 Lithuania	83
D1 France	81
C4 Serbia	65
A2 Israel	96
B3 Hungary	79
C1 Poland	56
D4 Slovenia	47
B1 Latvia	84
A4 Croatia	97
D2 Belgium	82
C3 Italy	54

Quarterfinals
A1 Spain	72
D3 Turkey	59
A3 Lithuania	61
D1 France	70
A2 Israel	80
C1 Poland	79
A4 Croatia	67
D2 Belgium	84

Semifinals
A1 Spain	54
D1 France	64
A2 Israel	78
D2 Belgium	69

Final
D1 France	79
A2 Israel	66
3rd place match
A1 Spain	81
D2 Belgium	59

=== Round of 16 ===
8 July 2026
13:00

Boxscore

Spain	77–37	Sweden
Scoring by quarter: 19–16, 16–2, 19–7, 23–12

Gargždų Arena, Klaipėda

8 July 2026
13:00

Boxscore

Poland	56–47	Slovenia
Scoring by quarter: 15–13, 17–13, 8–12, 16–9

Alytus Arena, Alytus

8 July 2026
15:30

Boxscore

Israel	96–79	Hungary
Scoring by quarter: 25–16, 27–20, 26–25, 18–18

Gargždų Arena, Klaipėda

8 July 2026
15:30

Boxscore

Iceland	62–84	Turkey
Scoring by quarter: 21–19, 13–29, 14–28, 14–8

Alytus Arena, Alytus

8 July 2026
18:00

Boxscore

Germany	69–83	Lithuania
Scoring by quarter: 21–21, 14–28, 17–17, 17–17

Gargždų Arena, Klaipėda

8 July 2026
18:00

Boxscore

Belgium	82–54	Italy
Scoring by quarter: 17–21, 22–11, 17–8, 26–14

Alytus Arena, Alytus

8 July 2026
20:30

Boxscore

Latvia	84–97	Croatia
Scoring by quarter: 22–26, 17–30, 25–12, 20–29

Gargždų Arena, Klaipėda

8 July 2026
20:30

Boxscore

France	81–65	Serbia
Scoring by quarter: 16–14, 31–18, 18–24, 16–9

Alytus Arena, Alytus

=== 9th–16th classification playoffs ===
9th–16th place quarterfinals
10 July
B4 Sweden	61
C2 Iceland	86
10 July
B2 Germany	74
C4 Serbia	52
10 July
B3 Hungary	61
D4 Slovenia	55
10 July
B1 Latvia	75
C3 Italy	61

9th–12th place semifinals
11 July
C2 Iceland	74
B2 Germany	85
11 July
B3 Hungary	79
B1 Latvia	60

Ninth place match
12 July
B2 Germany	57
B3 Hungary	60
Eleventh place match
12 July
C2 Iceland	80
B1 Latvia	85

13th–16th place semifinals
11 July
B4 Sweden	70
C4 Serbia	79
11 July
D4 Slovenia	68
C3 Italy	77

13th place match
12 July
C4 Serbia	60
C3 Italy	64
15th place match
12 July
B4 Sweden	73
D4 Slovenia	47

==== 9th–16th place quarterfinals ====
10 July 2026
13:00

Boxscore

Sweden	61–86	Iceland
Scoring by quarter: 16–21, 9–24, 20–19, 16–22

Alytus Arena, Alytus

10 July 2026
15:30

Boxscore

Germany	74–52	Serbia
Scoring by quarter: 27–16, 18–14, 14–10, 15–12

Alytus Arena, Alytus

10 July 2026
18:00

Boxscore

Hungary	61–55	Slovenia
Scoring by quarter: 11–10, 19–16, 17–15, 14–14

Alytus Arena, Alytus

10 July 2026
20:30

Boxscore

Latvia	75–61	Italy
Scoring by quarter: 16–26, 26–11, 14–11, 19–13

Alytus Arena, Alytus

==== 13th–16th place semifinals ====
11 July 2026
13:00

Boxscore

Sweden	70–79 (OT)	Serbia
Scoring by quarter: 19–18, 10–10, 17–19, 18–17, Overtime: 6–15

Alytus Arena, Alytus

11 July 2026
15:30

Boxscore

Slovenia	68–77 (OT)	Italy
Scoring by quarter: 12–17, 16–15, 20–13, 16–19, Overtime: 4–13

Alytus Arena, Alytus

==== 15th place game ====
12 July 2026
11:30

Boxscore

Sweden	73–47	Slovenia
Scoring by quarter: 15–9, 17–7, 20–20, 21–11

Alytus Arena, Alytus

==== 13th place game ====
12 July 2026
19:00

Boxscore

Serbia	60–64	Italy
Scoring by quarter: 22–14, 14–17, 10–13, 14–20

Alytus Arena, Alytus

==== 9th–12th place semifinals ====
11 July 2026
18:00

Boxscore

Iceland	74–85	Germany
Scoring by quarter: 11–22, 17–29, 31–7, 15–27

Alytus Arena, Alytus

11 July 2026
20:30

Boxscore

Hungary	79–60	Latvia
Scoring by quarter: 29–20, 22–16, 7–8, 21–16

Alytus Arena, Alytus

==== Eleventh place game ====
12 July 2026
14:00

Boxscore

Iceland	80–85	Latvia
Scoring by quarter: 22–23, 16–18, 17–24, 25–20

Alytus Arena, Alytus

==== Ninth place game ====
12 July 2026
16:30

Boxscore

Germany	57–60	Hungary
Scoring by quarter: 17–13, 8–18, 16–10, 16–19

Alytus Arena, Alytus

=== Quarterfinals ===
10 July 2026
13:00

Boxscore

Israel	80–79	Poland
Scoring by quarter: 23–16, 17–32, 18–17, 22–14

Gargždų Arena, Klaipėda

10 July 2026
15:30

Boxscore

Croatia	67–84	Belgium
Scoring by quarter: 18–19, 22–14, 15–23, 12–28

Gargždų Arena, Klaipėda

10 July 2026
18:00

Boxscore

Lithuania	61–70	France
Scoring by quarter: 12–29, 14–13, 15–14, 20–14

Gargždų Arena, Klaipėda

10 July 2026
20:30

Boxscore

Spain	72–59	Turkey
Scoring by quarter: 17–15, 18–11, 21–16, 16–17

Gargždų Arena, Klaipėda

=== 5th–8th classification playoffs ===
5th–8th place semifinals
11 July
D3 Turkey	69
A3 Lithuania	80
11 July
C1 Poland	76
A4 Croatia	66

Fifth place match
12 July
A3 Lithuania	64
C1 Poland	65
Seventh place match
12 July
D3 Turkey	85
A4 Croatia	80

==== 5th–8th place semifinals ====
11 July 2026
13:00

Boxscore

Poland	76–66	Croatia
Scoring by quarter: 12–20, 28–22, 22–14, 14–10

Gargždų Arena, Klaipėda

11 July 2026
15:30

Boxscore

Turkey	69–80	Lithuania
Scoring by quarter: 16–23, 27–21, 23–17, 3–19

Gargždų Arena, Klaipėda

==== Seventh place game ====
12 July 2026
13:00

Boxscore

Turkey	85–80	Croatia
Scoring by quarter: 15–22, 27–19, 24–16, 19–23

Gargždų Arena, Klaipėda

==== Fifth place game ====
12 July 2026
15:30

Boxscore

Lithuania	64–65	Poland
Scoring by quarter: 25–20, 10–21, 14–11, 15–13

Gargždų Arena, Klaipėda

=== Semifinals ===
11 July 2026
18:00

Boxscore

Israel	78–69	Belgium
Scoring by quarter: 24–20, 19–5, 20–21, 15–23

Gargždų Arena, Klaipėda

11 July 2026
20:30

Boxscore

Spain	54–64	France
Scoring by quarter: 19–18, 13–18, 10–14, 12–14

Gargždų Arena, Klaipėda

=== Third place game ===
12 July 2026
18:30

Boxscore

Belgium	59–81	Spain
Scoring by quarter: 18–21, 16–21, 15–19, 10–20

Gargždų Arena, Klaipėda

=== Final ===
12 July 2026
20:30

Boxscore

Israel	66–79	France
Scoring by quarter: 16–28, 15–16, 18–24, 11–17

Gargždų Arena, Klaipėda

== Final standings ==
Rank	Team	Record
1st place, gold medalist(s)	France	7–0
2nd place, silver medalist(s)	Israel	5–2
3rd place, bronze medalist(s)	Spain	6–1
4th	Belgium	4–3
5th	Poland	6–1
6th	Lithuania	3–4
7th	Turkey	3–4
8th	Croatia	1–6
9th	Hungary	4–3
10th	Germany	4–3
11th	Latvia	5–2
12th	Iceland	3–4
13th	Italy	3–4
14th	Serbia	1–6
15th	Sweden	1–6
16th	Slovenia	0–7

Relegated to the 2027 FIBA U20 Women's EuroBasket Division B
