= Israel women's national under-20 basketball team =

National basketball team of Israel

Israel
- FIBA zone: FIBA Europe
- National federation: Israeli Basketball Association

U20 EuroBasket
- Appearances: 6
- Medals: (silver) Silver: 1 (2026)

U20 EuroBasket Division B
- Appearances: 14
- Medals: (gold) Gold: 1 (2005); (bronze) Bronze: 1 (2022)

The Israel women's national under-20 basketball team is a national basketball team of Israel, administered by the Israeli Basketball Association. It represents the country in international under-20 women's basketball competitions.

== FIBA U20 Women's EuroBasket participations ==
Division A						Qualification					
Year	Pos.	GP	W	L	Ref.			GP	W	L	Ref.
(Slovakia) 2000	Did not qualify							4	1	3	
(Croatia) 2002	Did not qualify							4	0	4	
(France) 2004	Did not qualify							5	2	3	
Division A						Division B					
Year	Pos.	GP	W	L	Ref.	Year	Pos.	GP	W	L	Ref.
(France) 2005	Did not qualify					(Lithuania) 2005	1st place, gold medalist(s)	6	0	6	
(Hungary) 2006	14th	8	2	6		(Lithuania) 2006					
(Bulgaria) 2007	15th	6	1	5		(Lithuania) 2007					
(Italy) 2008	Did not qualify					(Poland) 2008	8th	7	1	6	
(Poland) 2009	Did not qualify					(North Macedonia) 2009	8th	7	1	6	
(Latvia) 2010	Did not qualify					(North Macedonia) 2010	6th	7	3	4	
(Serbia) 2011	Did not qualify					(North Macedonia) 2011	5th	8	5	3	
(Hungary) 2012	Did not qualify					(Czech Republic) 2012	6th	8	3	5	
(Turkey) 2013	Did not qualify					(Bulgaria) 2013	6th	8	3	5	
(Italy) 2014	Did not qualify					(Bulgaria) 2014	8th	9	3	6	
(Spain) 2015	Did not qualify					(Montenegro) 2015	8th	9	3	6	
(Portugal) 2016	Did not qualify					(Montenegro) 2016	10th	6	3	3	
(Portugal) 2017	Did not qualify					(Israel) 2017	7th	7	5	2	
(Hungary) 2018	Did not qualify					(Romania) 2018	6th	7	3	4	
(Czech Republic) 2019	Did not qualify					(Kosovo) 2019	5th	6	4	2	
(Hungary) 2022	Did not qualify					(North Macedonia) 2022	3rd place, bronze medalist(s)	6	5	1	
(Lithuania) 2023	7th	7	4	3		(Romania) 2023					
(Lithuania) 2024	9th	7	4	3		(Bulgaria) 2024					
(Portugal) 2025	6th	7	2	5		(Hungary) 2025					
(Lithuania) 2026	2nd place, silver medalist(s)	7	5	2		(Bulgaria) 2026					

== See also ==
- Israel women's national basketball team
- Israel women's national under-18 basketball team
- Israel men's national under-20 basketball team
