= 2002 FIBA Europe Under-20 Championship for Women =

2002 FIBA U20 Women's European Championship
2nd FIBA Under-20 Women's European Basketball Championship

Tournament details
- Host country: Croatia
- Dates: 26 July – 4 August 2002
- Teams: 12 (from 1 federation)
- Venue: (in 1 host city)

Final positions
- Champions: Czech Republic (1st title)

Tournament statistics
- Top scorer: (Slovakia) Číkošova (19.0)
- Top rebounds: (Italy) Dacic (12.6)
- Top assists: (Czech Republic) Uhrová (4.1)
- PPG (Team): Czech Republic (82.5)
- RPG (Team): Russia (38.6)
- APG (Team): Czech Republic (14.2)

Official website
- fibaeurope.com

The 2002 FIBA Europe Under-20 Championship for Women was the second edition of the FIBA Europe Under-20 Championship for Women. 12 teams featured the competition, held in Zagreb, Croatia, from 26 July to 4 August 2002. The Czech Republic won their first title.

== Qualification ==
Twenty-five national teams entered the qualifying round. They were allocated in five groups. The first two teams of each group qualified for the tournament, where they joined Russia (qualified as title holders) and Croatia (qualified as hosts).

Group A

Team	Pld	W	L	PF	PA	PD	Pts
Turkey	3	2	1	241	211	+30	5
Greece	3	2	1	235	205	+30	5
Bulgaria	3	2	1	219	223	−4	5
Finland	3	0	3	198	254	−56	3

Group B

Team	Pld	W	L	PF	PA	PD	Pts
France	5	5	0	419	225	+194	10
Italy	5	3	2	286	284	+2	8
England	5	2	3	296	321	−25	7
Belgium	5	2	3	293	357	−64	7
Portugal	5	2	3	276	325	−49	7
Denmark	5	1	4	271	329	−58	6

Group C

Team	Pld	W	L	PF	PA	PD	Pts
Slovakia	4	3	1	274	264	+10	7
Hungary	4	2	2	232	223	+9	6
Belarus	4	2	2	265	279	−14	6
Lithuania	4	2	2	295	251	+44	6
Romania	4	1	3	268	317	−49	5

Group D

Team	Pld	W	L	PF	PA	PD	Pts
Czech Republic	4	4	0	383	183	+200	8
Latvia	4	3	1	338	282	+56	7
Slovenia	4	2	2	256	257	−1	6
Sweden	4	1	3	268	320	−52	5
Switzerland	4	0	4	184	387	−203	4

Group E

Team	Pld	W	L	PF	PA	PD	Pts
Spain	4	4	0	274	182	+92	8
Germany	4	3	1	279	232	+47	7
Norway	4	2	2	265	283	−18	6
Ireland	4	1	3	231	270	−39	5
Israel	4	0	4	201	283	−82	4

=== Qualified teams ===
- Croatia
- Czech Republic
- France
- Germany
- Greece
- Hungary
- Italy
- Latvia
- Russia
- Slovakia
- Spain
- Turkey

== Preliminary round ==
The twelve teams were allocated in two groups of six teams each.

Team advanced to Quarterfinals
Team competed in 9th-12th playoffs

=== Group A ===
Team	Pld	W	L	PF	PA	Pts
Czech Republic	5	5	0	428	299	10
Latvia	5	4	1	332	319	9
France	5	3	2	319	281	8
Turkey	5	2	3	323	365	7
Germany	5	1	4	258	321	6
Italy	5	0	5	279	354	5

=== Group B ===
Team	Pld	W	L	PF	PA	Pts
Russia	5	5	0	365	310	10
Croatia	5	4	1	303	295	9
Spain	5	2	3	347	371	8
Greece	5	2	3	323	323	7
Hungary	5	1	4	355	372	6
Slovakia	5	1	4	327	349	5

== Knockout stage ==
=== 9th–12th playoffs ===
Playoffs
Germany	77
Slovakia	83
Hungary	64
Italy	59

Ninth place
Slovakia	60
Hungary	53
Eleventh place
Germany	54
Italy	68

=== Championship ===
Quarterfinals
Croatia	59
France	67
Czech Republic	79
Greece	72
Spain	63
Latvia	75
Russia	76
Turkey	49

Semifinals
France	57
Czech Republic	73
Latvia	50
Russia	56

Final
Czech Republic	77
Russia	74
Third place
France	77
Latvia	62

==== 5th–8th playoffs ====
Playoffs
Croatia	62
Greece	53
Spain	60
Turkey	41

Fifth place
Croatia	59
Spain	63
Seventh place
Greece	54
Turkey	52

2002 FIBA Europe U-20
Championship for Women

Czech Republic
First title

== Final standings ==
Team qualified for the 2003 FIBA World Championship for Young Women

Rank	Team	Record
Gold medal	Czech Republic	8-0
Silver medal	Russia	7-1
Bronze medal	France	5-3
4th	Latvia	5-3
5th	Spain	4-4
6th	Croatia	4-4
7th	Greece	3-5
8th	Turkey	2-6
9th	Slovakia	3-4
10th	Hungary	3-4
11th	Italy	1-6
12th	Germany	1-6
