= 2013 FIBA Europe Under-20 Championship for Women =

2013 FIBA U20 Women's European Championship
12th FIBA Under-20 Women's European Basketball Championship

Tournament details
- Host country: Turkey
- Dates: 4–14 July 2013
- Teams: 16 (from 1 confederation)
- Venues: 2 (in 1 host city)

Final positions
- Champions: Spain (4th title)

Tournament statistics
- MVP: (Spain) Astou Ndour

Official website
- www.fibaeurope.com

The 2013 FIBA Europe Under-20 Championship for Women was the 12th edition of the FIBA Europe Under-20 Championship for Women. 16 teams participated in the competition, held in Samsun, Turkey, from 4 to 14 July 2013. Spain won the tournament.

== Participating teams ==
- Belarus
- France
- Germany ▲ (Runners-up, 2012 FIBA Europe Under-20 Championship for Women Division B)
- Greece ▲ (Winners, 2012 FIBA Europe Under-20 Championship for Women Division B)
- Hungary ▲ (3rd place, 2012 FIBA Europe Under-20 Championship for Women Division B)
- Italy
- Lithuania
- Netherlands
- Poland
- Russia
- Serbia
- Slovakia
- Spain
- Sweden
- Turkey
- Ukraine

== First round ==
The first-round groups draw took place on 8 December 2012 in Freising, Germany. In the first round, the sixteen teams were allocated in four groups of four teams each. The top three teams of each group will qualify for the Second Round. The last team of each group will play in the Classification Group G first, then in the 9th–16th place playoffs.

Team advances to the Second Round
Team will compete in the Classification Group G

=== Group A ===
Team	Pld	W	L	PF	PA	PD	Pts
Netherlands	3	2	1	198	158	+40	5
Serbia	3	2	1	189	189	0	5
Belarus	3	2	1	181	186	−5	5
Ukraine	3	0	3	171	206	−35	3

4 July 2013
13:30

Report

Serbia	43–75	Netherlands
Scoring by quarter: 13- 25, 17-12, 11-17, 2-21
Pts: Kovačević, Stanaćev 11; Rebs: Marković 7 Asts: 3 players 2		Pts: Van der Keijl 23; Rebs: 3 players 12; Asts: Adams 7

Canik Atatürk Sports Hall, Samsun

4 July 2013
18:00

Ukraine	58–65	Belarus
Scoring by quarter: 13-16, 11-19, 19-14, 15-16

5 July 2013
13:30

Belarus	53–73	Serbia
Scoring by quarter: 8-17, 18-16, 9-14, 18-26

5 July 2013
20:15

Netherlands	68–52	Ukraine
Scoring by quarter: 27-9, 16-19, 9-12, 16-12

6 July 2013
15:45

Serbia	73–61	Ukraine
Scoring by quarter: 18-9, 16-13, 25-18, 14-21

6 July 2013
18:00

Belarus	63–55	Netherlands
Scoring by quarter: 13-17, 14-7, 13-21, 23-10

=== Group B ===
Team	Pld	W	L	PF	PA	PD	Pts
Spain	3	3	0	197	130	+67	6
Slovakia	3	2	1	168	152	+16	5
Greece	3	1	2	141	181	−40	4
Poland	3	0	3	131	174	−43	3

4 July 2013
15:45

Report

Poland	29–60	Spain
Scoring by quarter: 11-18, 8-15, 5-9, 5-18
Pts: Owczarzak 8 Rebs: Owczarzak 5 Asts: 3 players 1		Pts: Ndour 23; Rebs: Ndour 9 Asts: Rodriguez, Zanoguera 3

Canik Atatürk Sports Hall, Samsun

4 July 2013
20:15

Slovakia	56–38	Greece
Scoring by quarter: 13-6, 14-12, 14-10, 15-10

5 July 2013
15:45

Greece	54–50	Poland
Scoring by quarter: 9-8, 9-13, 23-16, 13-13

5 July 2013
18:00

Spain	62–52	Slovakia
Scoring by quarter: 17-14, 12-15, 17-7, 16-16

6 July 2013
13:30

Poland	52–60	Slovakia
Scoring by quarter: 14-21, 11-11, 13-13, 14-15

6 July 2013
20:15

Greece	49–75	Spain
Scoring by quarter: 13-19, 15-15, 11-18, 10-23

=== Group C ===
Team	Pld	W	L	PF	PA	PD	Pts
France	3	3	0	193	137	+56	6
Italy	3	2	1	143	147	−4	5
Russia	3	1	2	161	165	−4	4
Hungary	3	0	3	133	181	−48	3

4 July 2013
15:45

Report

Italy	41–65	France
Scoring by quarter: 16-10, 8-14, 9-18, 8-23
Pts: Dotto 10; Rebs: Formica 6 Asts: Dotto 3		Pts: Chevaugeon, Galliou 11; Rebs: Nayo 10; Asts: Bernies 4

Yaşar Doğu Sport Hall, Samsun

4 July 2013
18:00

Russia	64–52	Hungary
Scoring by quarter: 16-17, 13-10, 17-11, 18-14

Yaşar Doğu Sport Hall, Samsun

5 July 2013
18:00

Hungary	36–55	Italy
Scoring by quarter: 14-17, 11-8, 4-14, 7-16

Yaşar Doğu Sport Hall, Samsun

5 July 2013
13:30

France	66–51	Russia
Scoring by quarter: 16-14, 23-15, 13-11, 14-11

Yaşar Doğu Sport Hall, Samsun

6 July 2013
13:30

Italy	47–46	Russia
Scoring by quarter: 9-19, 11-6, 14-7, 13-14

Yaşar Doğu Sport Hall, Samsun

6 July 2013
15:45

Hungary	45–62	France
Scoring by quarter: 14-14, 9-18, 13-22, 9-8

Yaşar Doğu Sport Hall, Samsun

=== Group D ===
Team	Pld	W	L	PF	PA	PD	Pts
Turkey	3	3	0	221	157	+64	6
Sweden	3	2	1	208	180	+28	5
Germany	3	1	2	199	231	−32	4
Lithuania	3	0	3	176	236	−60	3

4 July 2013
13:30

Report

Lithuania	85–86	Germany
Scoring by quarter: 16-23, 19-28, 27-16, 23-19
Pts: Zelnyte 18; Rebs: Zelnyte 10; Asts: Kazlauskaite, Cerneckyte 3		Pts: Dzirma 17; Rebs: Dzirma 12; Asts: Dzirma 6

Yaşar Doğu Sport Hall, Samsun

4 July 2013
20:15

Report

Turkey	68–65	Sweden
Scoring by quarter: 18-19, 20-9, 17-19, 13-18

5 July 2013
15:45

Report

Sweden	69–47	Lithuania
Scoring by quarter: 18-17, 15-16, 19-6, 17-8

5 July 2013
20:15

Report

Germany	48–72	Turkey
Scoring by quarter: 14-13, 14-24, 12-17, 8-18

6 July 2013
18:00

Report

Germany	65–74	Sweden
Scoring by quarter: 12-16, 19-15, 11-26, 23-17

6 July 2013
20:15

Report

Turkey	81–44	Lithuania
Scoring by quarter: 21-9, 21-17, 21-12, 18-6

== Second round ==
Twelve advancing teams from the First Round were allocated in two groups of six teams each. The top four teams of each group advanced to the quarterfinals. The last two teams of each group played for the 9th–16th place against the teams from the Group G.

Team advances to Quarterfinals
Team will compete in 9th – 16th Place Playoff

=== Group E ===
Team	Pld	W	L	PF	PA	PD	Pts
Spain	5	5	0	351	258	+93	10
Serbia	5	3	2	273	292	−19	8
Slovakia	5	2	3	260	257	+3	7
Belarus	5	2	3	306	322	−16	7
Greece	5	2	3	257	300	−43	7
Netherlands	5	1	4	266	284	−18	6

8 July 2013
15:45

Report

Slovakia	43–54	Serbia
Scoring by quarter: 16-8, 10-15, 3-23, 14-8
Pts: Slamová 14; Rebs: Hruscáková 16; Asts: Bálintová 3		Pts: Brajković 13; Rebs: Kovačević, Brajković 10; Asts: Stanaćev 5

Canik Atatürk Sports Hall, Samsun
Referees: Maj Kazuko Forsberg (DEN), Fabiana Martinescu (ROU), Shoko Suguro (JPN)

8 July 2013
18:00

Report

Greece	56–50	Netherlands
Scoring by quarter: 8-16, 10-19, 23-6, 15-9
Pts: Spanou 25; Rebs: Spanou 17; Asts: Spanou 6		Pts: Essenstam 17; Rebs: Bettonvil 11; Asts: Bettonvil 4

Canik Atatürk Sports Hall, Samsun
Referees: Konstantin Simonow (GER), Igor Demenkov (RUS), Tamas Földhazi (HUN)

8 July 2013
20:15

Report

Belarus	72–83	Spain
Scoring by quarter: 8-24, 19-10, 19-15, 26-34
Pts: Lipinskaya 14; Rebs: Ivashchanka 8 Asts: Papova 5		Pts: Ndour 19; Rebs: Ndour 10; Asts: Zanoguera, Estebas 4

Canik Atatürk Sports Hall, Samsun
Referees: Mauro Pozzana (ITA), Radomir Vojinović (MNE), Vladimir Tsekov (BUL)

9 July 2013
15:45

Report

Greece	64–62	Belarus
Scoring by quarter: 12-19, 10-14, 16-13, 26-16
Pts: Stamolamprou 18; Rebs: Spanou 16; Asts: Christinaki, Stamolamprou 3		Pts: Papova 16; Rebs: Papova 15; Asts: Papova 4

Canik Atatürk Sports Hall, Samsun
Referees: Mauro Pozzana (ITA), Özlem Yalman (TUR), Shoko Suguro (JPN)

9 July 2013
18:00

Report

Netherlands	47–62	Slovakia
Scoring by quarter: 10-22, 11-11, 17-10, 9-19
Pts: van den Bosch 14; Rebs: Bettonvil 11; Asts: Klerx, Bettonvil 3		Pts: Oroszová 20; Rebs: Janoscíková 11; Asts: Slamová 5

Canik Atatürk Sports Hall, Samsun
Referees: Konstantin Simonow (GER), Martynas Gudas (LTU), Maj Kazuko Forsberg (DEN)

9 July 2013
20:15

Report

Serbia	46–71	Spain
Scoring by quarter: 12-21, 5-23, 14-14, 15-13
Pts: Stanaćev, Stanković 8 Rebs: Kovačević 6 Asts: Stanaćev, Marinković 2		Pts: Zanoguera 14; Rebs: Vilaró 9 Asts: Zanoguera 3

Canik Atatürk Sports Hall, Samsun
Referees: Marcin Kowalski (POL), Jean-Charles Collin (FRA), Vladyslav Isachenko (UKR)

10 July 2013
15:45

Report

Slovakia	47–56	Belarus
Scoring by quarter: 11-11, 19-19, 6-14, 11-12
Pts: Hruscáková 15; Rebs: Hruscáková 8 Asts: Bálintová 10		Pts: Papova 20; Rebs: 3 players 11; Asts: Lipinskaya, Papova 3

Canik Atatürk Sports Hall, Samsun
Referees: Damir Kunosić (BIH), Martynas Gudas (LTU), Igor Demenkov (RUS)

10 July 2013
18:00

Report

Serbia	57–50	Greece
Scoring by quarter: 11-13, 16-11, 16-14, 14-12
Pts: Kovačević 16; Rebs: Kovačević 11; Asts: Stanaćev 8		Pts: Stamolamprou 13; Rebs: 3 players 6 Asts: Politopoulou 2

Canik Atatürk Sports Hall, Samsun
Referees: Marcin Kowalski (POL), Konstantin Simonow (GER), Barry Peters (NED)

10 July 2013
20:15

Report

Spain	60–39	Netherlands
Scoring by quarter: 19-15, 15-10, 15-8, 11-6
Pts: Ndour 15; Rebs: 3 players 5 Asts: Vilaró 4		Pts: van der Keijl 12; Rebs: van der Keijl, Essenstam 7 Asts: Kraaijenoord 5

Canik Atatürk Sports Hall, Samsun
Referees: Fabiana Martinescu (ROU), Andrei Sharapa (BLR), Maja Vukanović (SRB)

=== Group F ===
Team	Pld	W	L	PF	PA	PD	Pts
France	5	4	1	285	218	+67	9
Turkey	5	4	1	276	242	+34	9
Italy	5	4	1	285	268	+17	9
Russia	5	2	3	270	256	+14	7
Sweden	5	1	4	284	308	−24	6
Germany	5	0	5	258	366	−108	5

8 July 2013
15:45

Report

Sweden	47–66	Italy
Scoring by quarter: 4-13, 13-17, 8-19, 22-17
Pts: Vesterberg 15; Rebs: Vesterberg 17; Asts: E. Nyström 3		Pts: F. Dotto 17; Rebs: Penna 9 Asts: C. Dotto 3

Yaşar Doğu Sport Hall, Samsun
Referees: Maka Kupatadze (GEO), Maja Vukanović (SRB), Özlem Yalman (TUR)

8 July 2013
18:00

Report

Germany	30–63	France
Scoring by quarter: 11-25, 4-8, 11-17, 4-13
Pts: Hebecker 13; Rebs: Hebecker 6 Asts: Gohlisch 4		Pts: Chevaugeon 11; Rebs: Ousfar 7 Asts: Bernies 5

Yaşar Doğu Sport Hall, Samsun
Referees: Antonio Conde (ESP), Barry Peters (NED), Vladyslav Isachenko (UKR)

8 July 2013
20:15

Report

Russia	43–52	Turkey
Scoring by quarter: 13-10, 8-20, 11-12, 11-10
Pts: Tikhonenko, Zamaraeva 8 Rebs: Tikhonenko 18; Asts: Tikhonenko, Riavkina 3		Pts: Cora 11; Rebs: Kavurmacioglu 16; Asts: Cakir, Kavurmacioglu 2

Yaşar Doğu Sport Hall, Samsun
Referees: Marcin Kowalski (POL), Damir Kunosić (BIH), Martynas Gudas (LTU)

9 July 2013
15:45

Report

Germany	51–80	Russia
Scoring by quarter: 11-22, 24-16, 10-25, 6-17
Pts: Heise 12; Rebs: Müller 8 Asts: Bradaric 5		Pts: Namok 13; Rebs: Tikhonenko 9 Asts: Tochilova 4

Yaşar Doğu Sport Hall, Samsun
Referees: Tomislav Vovk (CRO), Andrei Sharapa (BLR), Ernad Karović (BIH)

9 July 2013
18:00

Report

France	59–58	Sweden
Scoring by quarter: 19-11, 11-20, 18-14, 11-13
Pts: Diallo, Mbuyamba 14; Rebs: Mbuyamba 10; Asts: Bouzenna 2		Pts: Vesterberg, Frykbo 13; Rebs: Holmqvist 7 Asts: E. Nyström 3

Yaşar Doğu Sport Hall, Samsun
Referees: Antonio Conde (ESP), Pavel Fuska (SVK), Tamas Földhazi (HUN)

9 July 2013
20:15

Report

Italy	54–46	Turkey
Scoring by quarter: 14-6, 12-14, 16-13, 12-13
Pts: C. Dotto 14; Rebs: Formica, Penna 7 Asts: C. Dotto, F. Dotto 3		Pts: Cora 14; Rebs: Kavurmacioglu 8 Asts: Cora, Emirtekin 2

Yaşar Doğu Sport Hall, Samsun
Referees: Fabiana Martinescu (ROU), Maka Kupatadze (GEO), Maja Vukanović (SRB)

10 July 2013
15:45

Report

Sweden	40–50	Russia
Scoring by quarter: 10-12, 4-11, 12-11, 14-16
Pts: Vesterberg 11; Rebs: Vesterberg 10; Asts: E. Nyström 4		Pts: Tikhonenko 19; Rebs: Tikhonenko 13; Asts: Tochilova 3

Yaşar Doğu Sport Hall, Samsun
Referees: Jean-Charles Collin (FRA), Ernad Karović (BIH), Georgios Poursanidis (GRE)

10 July 2013
18:00

Report

Italy	77–64	Germany
Scoring by quarter: 19-12, 19-18, 19-15, 20-19
Pts: Milazzo 24; Rebs: Formica, Penna 5 Asts: Formica 3		Pts: Bellscheidt, Müller 10; Rebs: Hebecker 6 Asts: 4 players 3

Yaşar Doğu Sport Hall, Samsun
Referees: Antonio Conde (ESP), Pavel Fuska (SVK), Tamas Földhazi (HUN)

10 July 2013
20:15

Report

Turkey	38–32	France
Scoring by quarter: 5-12, 13-5, 4-4, 16-11
Pts: Bilgic 10; Rebs: Sezer 12; Asts: Cakir 4		Pts: Chevaugeon 8 Rebs: Mbuyamba 7 Asts: Bernies 2

Yaşar Doğu Sport Hall, Samsun
Referees: Tomislav Vovk (CRO), Radomir Vojinović (MNE), Vladyslav Isachenko (UKR)

== Classification Group G ==
The last team of each group of the First Round competed in this Classification Round.

Team	Pld	W	L	PF	PA	PD	Pts
Ukraine	3	2	1	188	165	+23	5
Lithuania	3	2	1	163	161	+2	5
Poland	3	2	1	159	158	+1	5
Hungary	3	0	3	147	173	−26	3

8 July 2013
13:30

Report

Ukraine	59–64	Lithuania

Canik Atatürk Sports Hall, Samsun

8 July 2013
13:30

Report

Poland	53–50	Hungary

Yaşar Doğu Sport Hall, Samsun

9 July 2013
13:30

Report

Hungary	53–72	Ukraine

Canik Atatürk Sports Hall, Samsun

9 July 2013
13:30

Report

Lithuania	51–58	Poland

Yaşar Doğu Sport Hall, Samsun

10 July 2013
13:30

Report

Ukraine	57–48	Poland

Canik Atatürk Sports Hall, Samsun

10 July 2013
13:30

Report

Hungary	44–48	Lithuania

Yaşar Doğu Sport Hall, Samsun

== 9th – 16th Place Playoff ==
12 July 2013
13:15

Report

Greece	59–49	Hungary

Canik Atatürk Sports Hall, Samsun

12 July 2013
15:30

Report

Germany	57–63	Ukraine

Canik Atatürk Sports Hall, Samsun

12 July 2013
17:45

Report

Sweden	60–71	Poland

Canik Atatürk Sports Hall, Samsun

12 July 2013
20:00

Report

Netherlands	58–56	Lithuania

Canik Atatürk Sports Hall, Samsun

=== Classification games for 13th – 16th place ===
13 July 2013
13:15

Report

Hungary	55–58	Germany

Canik Atatürk Sports Hall, Samsun

13 July 2013
15:30

Report

Sweden	72–42	Lithuania

Canik Atatürk Sports Hall, Samsun

=== Classification games for 9th – 12th place ===
13 July 2013
17:45

Report

Greece	70–58	Ukraine

Canik Atatürk Sports Hall, Samsun

13 July 2013
20:00

Report

Poland	49–50	Netherlands

Canik Atatürk Sports Hall, Samsun

== 1st – 8th Place Playoff ==
Quarter-finals
12 July 2013 – 18:30
Spain	78
Russia	45
12 July 2013 – 20:45
Turkey	61
Slovakia	42
12 July 2013 – 16:15
France	56
Belarus	64
12 July 2013 – 14:00
Serbia	51
Italy	65

Semi-finals
13 July 2013 – 20:45
Spain	57
Turkey	51
13 July 2013 – 18:30
Belarus	50
Italy	66

Final
14 July 2013 – 20:45
Spain	59
Italy	53
Third place
14 July 2013 – 18:30
Turkey	53
Belarus	38

=== Quarterfinals ===
12 July 2013
14:00

Report

Serbia	51–65	Italy

Yaşar Doğu Sport Hall, Samsun

12 July 2013
16:15

Report

France	56–64	Belarus

Yaşar Doğu Sport Hall, Samsun

12 July 2013
18:30

Report

Spain	78–45	Russia

Yaşar Doğu Sport Hall, Samsun

12 July 2013
20:45

Report

Turkey	61–42	Slovakia

Yaşar Doğu Sport Hall, Samsun

==== Classification games for 5th – 8th place ====
13 July 2013
14:00

Report

France	55–50	Serbia

Yaşar Doğu Sport Hall, Samsun

13 July 2013
16:15

Report

Russia	61–55	Slovakia

Yaşar Doğu Sport Hall, Samsun

=== Semifinals ===
13 July 2013
18:30

Report

Belarus	50–66	Italy

Yaşar Doğu Sport Hall, Samsun

13 July 2013
20:45

Report

Spain	57–51	Turkey

Yaşar Doğu Sport Hall, Samsun

== Final classification games ==
=== Match for 15th place ===
14 July 2013
13:15

Report

Hungary	72–51	Lithuania
Scoring by quarter: 24-19, 12-9, 12-11, 24-12

Canik Atatürk Sports Hall, Samsun

=== Match for 13th place ===
14 July 2013
15:30

Report

Germany	60–71	Sweden
Scoring by quarter: 16-12, 11-18, 19-17, 14-24

Canik Atatürk Sports Hall, Samsun

=== Match for 11th place ===
14 July 2013
17:45

Report

Ukraine	66–48	Poland
Scoring by quarter: 21-11, 11-16, 17-9, 17-12

Canik Atatürk Sports Hall, Samsun

=== Match for 9th place ===
14 July 2013
20:00

Report

Greece	56–52	Netherlands
Scoring by quarter: 13-10, 11-21, 11-6, 21-15

Canik Atatürk Sports Hall, Samsun

=== Match for 7th place ===
14 July 2013
14:00

Report

Slovakia	68–56	Serbia
Scoring by quarter: 23-9, 15-14, 15-22, 15-11

Yaşar Doğu Sport Hall, Samsun

=== Match for 5th place ===
14 July 2013
16:15

Report

Russia	48–55	France
Scoring by quarter: 9-11, 19-15, 13-15, 7-14

Yaşar Doğu Sport Hall, Samsun

=== Bronze medal match ===
14 July 2013
18:30

Report

Turkey	53–38	Belarus
Scoring by quarter: 15-6, 17-8, 14-12, 7-12

Yaşar Doğu Sport Hall, Samsun

=== Final ===
14 July 2013
20:45

Report

Spain	59–53	Italy
Scoring by quarter: 11-18, 14-10, 20-3, 14-22

Yaşar Doğu Sport Hall, Samsun
Attendance: 2 000
Referees: Fabiana Martinescu (ROU), Maka Kupatadze (GEO), Özlem Yalman (TUR)

== Final standings ==
Rank	Team
1st place, gold medalist(s)	Spain
2nd place, silver medalist(s)	Italy
3rd place, bronze medalist(s)	Turkey
4th	Belarus
5th	France
6th	Russia
7th	Slovakia
8th	Serbia
9th	Greece
10th	Netherlands
11th	Ukraine
12th	Poland
13th	Sweden
14th	Germany
15th	Hungary
16th	Lithuania

2013 FIBA Europe Women's Under-20 Championship winners

Spain
4th title

Team relegated to 2014 FIBA Europe Under-20 Championship for Women Division B
