= 2022 FIBA U20 Women's European Championship Division B =

Tournament details
- Host country: North Macedonia
- City: Skopje
- Dates: 9–17 July 2022
- Teams: 18 (from 1 confederation)
- Venues: 2 (in 1 host city)

Final positions
- Champions: Montenegro (2nd title)
- Runners-up: Turkey
- Third place: Israel

Official website
- www.fiba.basketball

The 2022 FIBA U20 Women's European Championship Division B was the 16th edition of the Division B of the Women's European basketball championship for national under-20 teams. It was played from 9 to 17 July 2022 in Skopje, North Macedonia. Montenegro women's national under-20 basketball team won the tournament.

== Participating teams ==
- Albania
- Armenia
- Croatia
- Georgia
- Germany ▼ (16th place, 2019 FIBA U20 Women's European Championship Division A)
- Greece
- Iceland
- Israel
- Kosovo
- Montenegro
- North Macedonia
- Norway
- Romania
- Slovakia
- Slovenia
- Switzerland
- Turkey
- Ukraine

== First round ==
The draw of the first round was held on 15 February 2022 in Freising, Germany.

In the first round, the teams were drawn into four groups of four or five. The first two teams from each group advance to the playoffs; the other teams will play in the 9th–18th place classification round.

=== Group A ===
Pos	Team	Pld	W	L	PF	PA	PD	Pts	Qualification
1	Turkey	4	4	0	309	180	+129	8	Quarterfinals
2	Greece	4	3	1	327	195	+132	7	Quarterfinals
3	Switzerland	4	2	2	254	220	+34	6	9th–18th place classification
4	Ukraine	4	1	3	224	289	−65	5	9th–18th place classification
5	Albania	4	0	4	143	373	−230	4	9th–18th place classification

Source: FIBA

9 July 2022
14:15

Boxscore

Greece	119–20	Albania

Boris Trajkovski Sports Center, Skopje

9 July 2022
16:30

Boxscore

Ukraine	45–88	Turkey

Boris Trajkovski Sports Center, Skopje

10 July 2022
21:00

Boxscore

Switzerland	67–44	Ukraine

Boris Trajkovski Sports Center, Skopje

10 July 2022
21:00

Boxscore

Turkey	64–55	Greece

SRC Kale, Skopje

11 July 2022
16:30

Boxscore

Greece	71–55	Switzerland

SRC Kale, Skopje

11 July 2022
21:00

Boxscore

Albania	35–88	Turkey

SRC Kale, Skopje

12 July 2022
18:45

Boxscore

Switzerland	87–36	Albania

Boris Trajkovski Sports Center, Skopje

12 July 2022
21:00

Boxscore

Ukraine	56–82	Greece

SRC Kale, Skopje

13 July 2022
18:45

Boxscore

Albania	52–79	Ukraine

Boris Trajkovski Sports Center, Skopje

13 July 2022
21:00

Boxscore

Turkey	69–45	Switzerland

SRC Kale, Skopje

=== Group B ===
Pos	Team	Pld	W	L	PF	PA	PD	Pts	Qualification
1	Israel	3	3	0	275	147	+128	6	Quarterfinals
2	Germany	3	2	1	269	130	+139	5	Quarterfinals
3	Armenia	3	1	2	119	249	−130	4	9th–18th place classification
4	Georgia	3	0	3	125	262	−137	3	9th–18th place classification

Source: FIBA

9 July 2022
18:45

Boxscore

Armenia	49–46	Georgia

Boris Trajkovski Sports Center, Skopje

9 July 2022
21:00

Boxscore

Germany	63–65	Israel

Boris Trajkovski Sports Center, Skopje

11 July 2022
16:30

Boxscore

Georgia	35–105	Germany

Boris Trajkovski Sports Center, Skopje

11 July 2022
18:45

Boxscore

Israel	102–40	Armenia

Boris Trajkovski Sports Center, Skopje

13 July 2022
14:15

Boxscore

Armenia	30–101	Germany

SRC Kale, Skopje

13 July 2022
16:30

Boxscore

Israel	108–44	Georgia

SRC Kale, Skopje

=== Group C ===
Pos	Team	Pld	W	L	PF	PA	PD	Pts	Qualification
1	Montenegro	4	4	0	355	191	+164	8	Quarterfinals
2	North Macedonia	4	2	2	238	284	−46	6	Quarterfinals
3	Romania	4	2	2	270	250	+20	6	9th–18th place classification
4	Kosovo	4	1	3	231	328	−97	5	9th–18th place classification
5	Croatia	4	1	3	227	268	−41	5	9th–18th place classification

Source: FIBA

9 July 2022
14:15

Boxscore

Romania	79–54	Croatia

SRC Kale, Skopje

9 July 2022
18:45

Boxscore

Kosovo	69–83	North Macedonia

SRC Kale, Skopje

10 July 2022
18:45

Boxscore

Montenegro	77–53	Romania

SRC Kale, Skopje

10 July 2022
18:45

Boxscore

Croatia	60–63	Kosovo

Boris Trajkovski Sports Center, Skopje

11 July 2022
14:15

Boxscore

Kosovo	35–100	Montenegro

SRC Kale, Skopje

11 July 2022
18:45

Boxscore

North Macedonia	46–64	Croatia

SRC Kale, Skopje

12 July 2022
18:45

Boxscore

Montenegro	98–54	North Macedonia

SRC Kale, Skopje

12 July 2022
21:00

Boxscore

Romania	85–64	Kosovo

Boris Trajkovski Sports Center, Skopje

13 July 2022
18:45

Boxscore

North Macedonia	55–53	Romania

SRC Kale, Skopje

13 July 2022
21:00

Boxscore

Croatia	49–80	Montenegro

Boris Trajkovski Sports Center, Skopje

=== Group D ===
Pos	Team	Pld	W	L	PF	PA	PD	Pts	Qualification
1	Slovenia	3	3	0	227	147	+80	6	Quarterfinals
2	Norway	3	1	2	173	196	−23	4	Quarterfinals
3	Slovakia	3	1	2	145	165	−20	4	9th–18th place classification
4	Iceland	3	1	2	156	193	−37	4	9th–18th place classification

Source: FIBA

9 July 2022
16:30

Boxscore

Norway	51–87	Slovenia

SRC Kale, Skopje

9 July 2022
21:00

Boxscore

Slovakia	46–50	Iceland

SRC Kale, Skopje

11 July 2022
14:15

Boxscore

Iceland	57–71	Norway

Boris Trajkovski Sports Center, Skopje

11 July 2022
21:00

Boxscore

Slovenia	64–47	Slovakia

Boris Trajkovski Sports Center, Skopje

13 July 2022
14:15

Boxscore

Norway	51–52	Slovakia

Boris Trajkovski Sports Center, Skopje

13 July 2022
16:30

Boxscore

Iceland	49–76	Slovenia

Boris Trajkovski Sports Center, Skopje

== Classification round ==
=== Group E ===
Pos	Team	Pld	W	L	PF	PA	PD	Pts	Qualification
1	Switzerland	4	4	0	354	184	+170	8	9th place match
2	Ukraine	4	3	1	290	191	+99	7	11th place match
3	Albania	4	2	2	228	287	−59	6	13th place match
4	Armenia	4	1	3	204	345	−141	5	15th place match
5	Georgia	4	0	4	188	257	−69	4	17th place match

Source: FIBA

14 July 2022
18:45

Boxscore

Ukraine	58–37	Georgia

Boris Trajkovski Sports Center, Skopje

14 July 2022
21:00

Boxscore

Armenia	58–74	Albania

Boris Trajkovski Sports Center, Skopje

15 July 2022
14:15

Boxscore

Georgia	63–66	Albania

SRC Kale, Skopje

15 July 2022
18:45

Boxscore

Switzerland	116–62	Armenia

SRC Kale, Skopje

16 July 2022
14:15

Boxscore

Switzerland	84–42	Georgia

SRC Kale, Skopje

16 July 2022
16:30

Boxscore

Armenia	35–109	Ukraine

SRC Kale, Skopje

=== Group F ===
Pos	Team	Pld	W	L	PF	PA	PD	Pts	Qualification
1	Romania	4	3	1	293	231	+62	7	9th place match
2	Iceland	4	3	1	254	214	+40	7	11th place match
3	Slovakia	4	2	2	232	207	+25	6	13th place match
4	Kosovo	4	1	3	211	288	−77	5	15th place match
5	Croatia	4	1	3	226	276	−50	5	17th place match

Source: FIBA

14 July 2022
18:45

Boxscore

Kosovo	44–65	Iceland

SRC Kale, Skopje

14 July 2022
21:00

Boxscore

Slovakia	55–67	Croatia

SRC Kale, Skopje

15 July 2022
16:30

Boxscore

Iceland	79–45	Croatia

SRC Kale, Skopje

15 July 2022
21:00

Boxscore

Romania	50–53	Slovakia

SRC Kale, Skopje

16 July 2022
18:45

Boxscore

Romania	79–60	Iceland

SRC Kale, Skopje

16 July 2022
21:00

Boxscore

Slovakia	78–40	Kosovo

SRC Kale, Skopje

=== 17th place match ===
17 July 2022
12:00

Boxscore

Georgia	45–74	Croatia

Boris Trajkovski Sports Center, Skopje

=== 15th place match ===
17 July 2022
11:30

Boxscore

Armenia	64–70	Kosovo

SRC Kale, Skopje

=== 13th place match ===
17 July 2022
13:45

Boxscore

Albania	56–78	Slovakia

SRC Kale, Skopje

=== 11th place match ===
17 July 2022
16:00

Boxscore

Ukraine	72–55	Iceland

SRC Kale, Skopje

=== 9th place match ===
17 July 2022
18:15

Boxscore

Switzerland	79–52	Romania

SRC Kale, Skopje

== Championship playoffs ==
5th place match
B2	Germany	49
A2	Greece	74
7th place match
C2	North Macedonia	45
D2	Norway	77

5th–8th place semifinals
B2	Germany	87
C2	North Macedonia	44
A2	Greece	78
D2	Norway	53

Quarterfinals
A1	Turkey	68
B2	Germany	62
D1	Slovenia	63
C2	North Macedonia	36
B1	Israel	65
A2	Greece	57
C1	Montenegro	85
D2	Norway	35

Semifinals
A1	Turkey	60
D1	Slovenia	59
B1	Israel	71
C1	Montenegro	81

Final
A1	Turkey	56
C1	Montenegro	98
3rd place match
D1	Slovenia	64
B1	Israel	82

=== Quarterfinals ===
15 July 2022
14:15

Boxscore

Turkey	68–62	Germany

Boris Trajkovski Sports Center, Skopje

15 July 2022
16:30

Boxscore

Israel	65–57	Greece

Boris Trajkovski Sports Center, Skopje

15 July 2022
18:45

Boxscore

Slovenia	63–36	North Macedonia

Boris Trajkovski Sports Center, Skopje

15 July 2022
21:00

Boxscore

Montenegro	85–35	Norway

Boris Trajkovski Sports Center, Skopje

=== 5th–8th place semifinals ===
16 July 2022
14:15

Boxscore

Germany	87–44	North Macedonia

Boris Trajkovski Sports Center, Skopje

16 July 2022
16:30

Boxscore

Greece	78–53	Norway

Boris Trajkovski Sports Center, Skopje

=== Semifinals ===
16 July 2022
18:45

Boxscore

Turkey	60–59	Slovenia

Boris Trajkovski Sports Center, Skopje

16 July 2022
21:00

Boxscore

Israel	71–81	Montenegro

Boris Trajkovski Sports Center, Skopje

=== 7th place match ===
17 July 2022
14:15

Boxscore

North Macedonia	45–77	Norway

Boris Trajkovski Sports Center, Skopje

=== 5th place match ===
17 July 2022
16:30

Boxscore

Germany	49–74	Greece

Boris Trajkovski Sports Center, Skopje

=== 3rd place match ===
17 July 2022
18:45

Boxscore

Slovenia	64–82	Israel

Boris Trajkovski Sports Center, Skopje

=== Final ===
17 July 2022
21:00

Boxscore

Turkey	56–98	Montenegro

Boris Trajkovski Sports Center, Skopje

== Final standings ==
Rank	Team
1st place, gold medalist(s)	Montenegro
2nd place, silver medalist(s)	Turkey
3rd place, bronze medalist(s)	Israel
4	Slovenia
5	Greece
6	Germany
7	Norway
8	North Macedonia
9	Switzerland
10	Romania
11	Ukraine
12	Iceland
13	Slovakia
14	Albania
15	Kosovo
16	Armenia
17	Croatia
18	Georgia

Promoted to the 2023 FIBA U20 Women's European Championship Division A
