= 2014 FIBA Europe Under-20 Championship for Women =

2014 FIBA U20 Women's European Championship
13th FIBA Under-20 Women's European Basketball Championship

Tournament details
- Host country: Italy
- Dates: 3–13 July 2014
- Teams: 16 (from 1 confederation)
- Venues: 2 (in 1 host city)

Final positions
- Champions: France (3rd title)

Official website
- www.fibaeurope.com

The 2014 FIBA Europe Under-20 Championship for Women was the 13th edition of the FIBA Europe Under-20 Championship for Women. 16 teams participated in the competition, played in Udine, Italy, from 3 to 13 July 2014. France won the tournament.

== Participating teams ==
- Belarus
- Belgium ▲ (Winners, 2013 FIBA Europe Under-20 Championship for Women Division B)
- Czech Republic ▲ (Runners-up, 2013 FIBA Europe Under-20 Championship for Women Division B)
- France
- Greece
- Italy
- Latvia ▲ (3rd place, 2013 FIBA Europe Under-20 Championship for Women Division B)
- Netherlands
- Poland
- Russia
- Serbia
- Slovakia
- Spain
- Sweden
- Turkey
- Ukraine

== First round ==
The first-round groups draw took place on 1 December 2013 in Freising, Germany. In the first round, the sixteen teams were allocated in four groups of four teams each. The top three teams of each group will qualify for the Second Round. The last team of each group will play in the Classification Group G first, then in the 9th–16th place playoffs.

Team advances to the Second Round
Team will compete in the Classification Group G

=== Group A ===
Team	Pld	W	L	PF	PA	PD	Pts
Turkey	3	3	0	185	138	+47	6
Russia	3	2	1	178	143	+35	5
Czech Republic	3	1	2	172	213	−41	4
Belgium	3	0	3	144	185	−41	3

3 July 2014
14:00

Report

Russia	47–53	Turkey
Scoring by quarter: 9-12, 11-16, 11-11, 16-14
Pts: Novikova (13); Rebs: 3 players tied with 5 Asts: Shchetina (2)		Pts: Şenyürek (11); Rebs: Çoklar (7); Asts: 5 players tied with 1

Palasport Manlio Benedetti, Udine
Referees: Carole Delauné (FRA), Andrei Sharapa (BLR), Laurie Meboung (CMR)

3 July 2014
20:45

Report

Czech Republic	71–64	Belgium
Scoring by quarter: 18-15, 15-9, 17-20, 21-20
Pts: Hoskova (22); Rebs: Vojtíková (6); Asts: Vyoralová (2), Andelová (2)		Pts: Adams (19); Rebs: Bende (9); Asts: Adams (2), Bende (2)

Palasport Manlio Benedetti, Udine
Referees: Oskars Lucis (LAT), Jelena Smiljanic (SRB), Kimiko Nakadake (JPN)

4 July 2014
18:30

Report

Turkey	84–49	Czech Republic
Scoring by quarter: 18-12, 21-14, 27-12, 18-11
Pts: Şenyürek (16); Rebs: Köksal (8); Asts: 4 players tied with 2		Pts: Opocenska (11); Rebs: Vojtíková (6); Asts: Havlikova (3), Matulkova (3)

PalaIndoor, Udine
Referees: Fernando Calatrava Cuevas (ESP), Marek Kukelcik (SVK), Asa Johansson (SWE)

4 July 2014
20:45

Report

Belgium	38–66	Russia
Scoring by quarter: 9-13, 10-23, 12-15, 7-15
Pts: Delaere (11); Rebs: Delaere (6), Nauwelaers (6); Asts: Bende (2), Adams (2)		Pts: Gladkova (12); Rebs: 3 players tied with 5 Asts: Gladkova (2)

Palasport Manlio Benedetti, Udine
Referees: Manuel Mazzoni (ITA), Vasiliki Tsaroucha (GRE), Dariusz Zapolski (POL)

5 July 2014
16:15

Report

Russia	65–52	Czech Republic
Scoring by quarter: 17-11, 20-10, 11-18, 17-13
Pts: Razheva (19); Rebs: Marchenkova (10), Novikova (13); Asts: Novikova (5)		Pts: Hoskova (17); Rebs: Hoskova (6); Asts: Havlikova (2)

PalaIndoor, Udine
Referees: Andrej Lovsin (SLO), Fabiana Martinescu (ROU), Asa Johansson (SWE)

5 July 2014
18:30

Report

Belgium	42–48	Turkey
Scoring by quarter: 6-11, 12-14, 16-13, 8-10
Pts: Nauwelaers (12); Rebs: Grzesinski (12); Asts: De Baets (3)		Pts: Köksal (10); Rebs: Şenyürek (10); Asts: 4 players tied with 2

PalaIndoor, Udine
Referees: Nuno Monteiro (POR), Andrei Sharapa (BLR), Maj Kazuko Forsberg (DEN)

=== Group B ===
Team	Pld	W	L	PF	PA	PD	Pts
Spain	3	3	0	175	146	+29	6
France	3	2	1	177	127	+50	5
Latvia	3	1	2	178	196	−18	4
Greece	3	0	3	130	191	−61	3

3 July 2014
16:15

Greece	56–69	Latvia

Palasport Manlio Benedetti, Udine

3 July 2014
18:30

France	42–48	Spain

Palasport Manlio Benedetti, Udine

4 July 2014
14:00

Latvia	43–68	France

PalaIndoor, Udine

4 July 2014
16:15

Spain	55–38	Greece

PalaIndoor, Udine

5 July 2014
18:30

France	67–36	Greece

Palasport Manlio Benedetti, Udine

5 July 2014
20:45

Latvia	66–72	Spain

Palasport Manlio Benedetti, Udine

=== Group C ===
Team	Pld	W	L	PF	PA	PD	Pts
Serbia	3	2	1	211	196	+15	5
Slovakia	3	2	1	201	169	+32	5
Ukraine	3	1	2	174	201	−27	4
Sweden	3	1	2	164	184	−20	4

3 July 2014
14:00

Serbia	70–67	Slovakia

PalaIndoor, Udine

3 July 2014
16:15

Sweden	51–59	Ukraine

PalaIndoor, Udine

4 July 2014
14:00

Slovakia	62–38	Sweden

Palasport Manlio Benedetti, Udine

4 July 2014
18:30

Ukraine	54–78	Serbia

Palasport Manlio Benedetti, Udine

5 July 2014
14:00

Serbia	63–75	Sweden

PalaIndoor, Udine

5 July 2014
14:00

Ukraine	61–72	Slovakia

Palasport Manlio Benedetti, Udine

=== Group D ===
Team	Pld	W	L	PF	PA	PD	Pts
Netherlands	3	2	1	197	154	+43	5
Poland	3	2	1	184	143	+41	5
Italy	3	2	1	164	173	−9	5
Belarus	3	0	3	146	221	−75	3

3 July 2014
18:30

Poland	73–34	Belarus

PalaIndoor, Udine

3 July 2014
20:45

Netherlands	65–39	Italy

PalaIndoor, Udine

4 July 2014
16:15

Belarus	60–82	Netherlands

Palasport Manlio Benedetti, Udine

4 July 2014
20:45

Italy	59–56	Poland

PalaIndoor, Udine

5 July 2014
16:15

Netherlands	50–55	Poland

Palasport Manlio Benedetti, Udine

5 July 2014
20:45

Belarus	52–66	Italy

PalaIndoor, Udine

== Second round ==
Twelve advancing teams from the First Round were allocated in two groups of six teams each. The top four teams of each group advanced to the quarterfinals. The last two teams of each group played for the 9th – 16th place against the teams from the Group G.

Team advances to the Quarterfinals
Team will compete in the 9th – 16th place playoffs

=== Group E ===
Team	Pld	W	L	PF	PA	PD	Pts
Spain	5	4	1	320	283	+37	9
France	5	4	1	302	235	+67	9
Russia	5	3	2	303	288	+15	8
Latvia	5	2	3	287	305	−18	7
Turkey	5	2	3	280	269	+11	7
Czech Republic	5	0	5	251	363	−112	5

7 July 2014
16:15

Czech Republic	58–70	Spain

Palasport Manlio Benedetti, Udine

7 July 2014
18:30

France	55–51	Russia

Palasport Manlio Benedetti, Udine

7 July 2014
20:45

Latvia	60–53	Turkey

Palasport Manlio Benedetti, Udine

8 July 2014
16:15

Latvia	59–49	Czech Republic

Palasport Manlio Benedetti, Udine

8 July 2014
16:15

Russia	77–69	Spain

PalaIndoor, Udine

8 July 2014
18:30

Turkey	50–52	France

PalaIndoor, Udine

9 July 2014
18:30

Spain	61–40	Turkey

PalaIndoor, Udine

9 July 2014
18:30

Russia	63–59	Latvia

Palasport Manlio Benedetti, Udine

9 July 2014
20:45

France	85–43	Czech Republic

Palasport Manlio Benedetti, Udine

=== Group F ===
Team	Pld	W	L	PF	PA	PD	Pts
Serbia	5	4	1	345	301	+44	9
Italy	5	3	2	289	301	−12	8
Slovakia	5	3	2	318	279	+39	8
Poland	5	2	3	271	288	−17	7
Ukraine	5	2	3	284	321	−37	7
Netherlands	5	1	4	263	280	−17	6

7 July 2014
16:15

Ukraine	59–50	Netherlands

PalaIndoor, Udine

7 July 2014
18:30

Poland	42–58	Slovakia

PalaIndoor, Udine

7 July 2014
20:45

Italy	77–67	Serbia

PalaIndoor, Udine

8 July 2014
18:30

Slovakia	64–46	Netherlands

Palasport Manlio Benedetti, Udine

8 July 2014
20:45

Italy	54–56	Ukraine

PalaIndoor, Udine

8 July 2014
20:45

Serbia	67–51	Poland

Palasport Manlio Benedetti, Udine

9 July 2014
16:15

Netherlands	52–63	Serbia

PalaIndoor, Udine

9 July 2014
16:15

Poland	67–54	Ukraine

Palasport Manlio Benedetti, Udine

9 July 2014
20:45

Slovakia	57–60	Italy

PalaIndoor, Udine

== Classification Group G ==
The last team of each group of the First Round competed in this Classification Round.

Team	Pld	W	L	PF	PA	PD	Pts
Belgium	3	3	0	157	145	+12	6
Belarus	3	2	1	184	142	+42	5
Sweden	3	1	2	142	152	−10	4
Greece	3	0	3	140	184	−44	3

7 July 2014
14:00

Belgium	51–48	Belarus

Palasport Manlio Benedetti, Udine

7 July 2014
14:00

Greece	39–55	Sweden

PalaIndoor, Udine

8 July 2014
14:00

Sweden	43–45	Belgium

Palasport Manlio Benedetti, Udine

8 July 2014
14:00

Belarus	68–47	Greece

PalaIndoor, Udine

9 July 2014
14:00

Belgium	61–54	Greece

Palasport Manlio Benedetti, Udine

9 July 2014
14:00

Sweden	44–68	Belarus

PalaIndoor, Udine

== 9th – 16th place playoffs ==
11 July 2014
14:00

Turkey	50–39	Greece

Palasport Manlio Benedetti, Udine

11 July 2014
16:15

Czech Republic	56–44	Belgium

Palasport Manlio Benedetti, Udine

11 July 2014
18:30

Netherlands	64–61	Belarus

Palasport Manlio Benedetti, Udine

11 July 2014
20:45

Ukraine	56–47	Sweden

Palasport Manlio Benedetti, Udine

=== Classification games for 13th – 16th place ===
12 July 2014
14:00

Greece	48–60	Belgium

Palasport Manlio Benedetti, Udine

12 July 2014
16:15

Sweden	57–67	Belarus

Palasport Manlio Benedetti, Udine

=== Classification games for 9th – 12th place ===
12 July 2014
18:30

Turkey	73–60	Czech Republic

Palasport Manlio Benedetti, Udine

12 July 2014
20:45

Ukraine	59–84	Netherlands

Palasport Manlio Benedetti, Udine

== 1st – 8th place playoffs ==
Quarter-finals
11 July 2014 – 18:30
Spain	49
Poland	35
11 July 2014 – 20:45
Italy	73
Russia	64
11 July 2014 – 16:15
Serbia	79
Latvia	50
11 July 2014 – 14:00
France	66
Slovakia	61

Semi-finals
12 July 2014 – 20:45
Spain	64
Italy	46
12 July 2014 – 18:30
Serbia	44
France	50

Final
13 July 2014 – 20:45
Spain	42
France	47
Third place
13 July 2014 – 18:30
Italy	68
Serbia	63

=== Quarterfinals ===
11 July 2014
14:00

France	66–61	Slovakia

PalaIndoor, Udine

11 July 2014
16:15

Serbia	79–50	Latvia

PalaIndoor, Udine

11 July 2014
18:30

Spain	49–35	Poland

PalaIndoor, Udine

11 July 2014
20:45

Italy	73–64	Russia

PalaIndoor, Udine

==== Classification games for 5th – 8th place ====
12 July 2014
14:00

Latvia	60–59	Slovakia

PalaIndoor, Udine

12 July 2014
16:15

Poland	69–65	Russia

PalaIndoor, Udine

=== Semifinals ===
12 July 2014
18:30

Serbia	44–50	France

PalaIndoor, Udine

12 July 2014
20:45

Spain	64–46	Italy

PalaIndoor, Udine

== Final classification games ==
=== Match for 15th place ===
13 July 2014
10:30

Report

Greece	50–59	Sweden
Scoring by quarter: 12-12, 11-18, 15-9, 12-20
Pts: Tarla (25); Rebs: Tarla (7); Asts: Stamolamprou (2)		Pts: Claesson (16; Rebs: Hanson (9); Asts: Mirkovic (4)

Palasport Manlio Benedetti, Udine
Referees: Vladyslav Isachenko (UKR), Mila Cavara (BIH), Marek Kukelcik (SVK)

=== Match for 13th place ===
13 July 2014
12:45

Report

Belgium	47–41	Belarus
Scoring by quarter: 10-4, 15-10, 9-18, 13-9
Pts: Adams (12); Rebs: Nauwelaers (9); Asts: Goyvaerts (2), De Baets (2)		Pts: Tsarevich (10), Holubeva (10); Rebs: Papova (12); Asts: Papova (3)

Palasport Manlio Benedetti, Udine
Referees: Aytuğ Ekti (TUR), Manuel Mazzoni (ITA), Ilona Kucerova (CZE)

=== Match for 11th place ===
13 July 2014
15:00

Report

Czech Republic	64–57	Ukraine
Scoring by quarter: 19-11, 18-18, 12-20, 15-8
Pts: Vojtíková (16); Rebs: Burzová (7), Vojtíková (7); Asts: Samková (2), Hoskova (2)		Pts: Antonyuk (18); Rebs: Antonyuk (18); Asts: Krayevska (2), Antonyuk (2)

Palasport Manlio Benedetti, Udine
Referees: Maka Kupatadze (GEO), Vasiliki Tsaroucha (GRE), Jelena Smiljanic (SRB)

=== Match for 9th place ===
13 July 2014
17:15

Report

Turkey	60–45	Netherlands
Scoring by quarter: 26-16, 18-5, 9-14, 7-10
Pts: Şenyürek (19); Rebs: Çoklar (14); Asts: Bilgiç (4)		Pts: Klerx (13); Rebs: Treffers (15); Asts: Hoveling (1)

Palasport Manlio Benedetti, Udine
Referees: Vladyslav Isachenko (UKR), Oskars Lucis (LAT), Jelena Tomic (CRO)

=== Match for 7th place ===
13 July 2014
14:00

Report

Russia	68–50	Slovakia
Scoring by quarter: 18-6, 16-21, 21-15, 13-8
Pts: Razheva (14); Rebs: Shchetina (10); Asts: 5 players tied with 2		Pts: Slamová (13); Rebs: Bálintová (5); Asts: Dudásová (5)

PalaIndoor, Udine
Referees: Fernando Calatrava Cuevas (ESP), Andrei Sharapa (BLR), Asa Johansson (SWE)

=== Match for 5th place ===
13 July 2014
16:15

Report

Poland	46–60	Latvia
Scoring by quarter: 13-16, 15-9, 8-17, 10-18
Pts: Stankiewicz (21); Rebs: Szajtauer (6); Asts: Wozniak (2)		Pts: Kreslina (20); Rebs: Veidere (12); Asts: Jakobsone (3)

PalaIndoor, Udine
Referees: Nuno Monteiro (POR), Vincent Delestrée (BEL), Kimiko Nakadake (JPN)

=== Bronze medal match ===
13 July 2014
18:30

Report

Italy	68–63	Serbia
Scoring by quarter: 15-18, 17-13, 19-19, 17-13
Pts: Gambarini (16); Rebs: Ercoli (10); Asts: Gambarini (5)		Pts: Topuzovic (16); Rebs: Topuzovic (10); Asts: Stanacev (9)

PalaIndoor, Udine
Referees: Andrej Lovsin (SLO), Carole Delauné (FRA), Dariusz Zapolski (POL)

=== Final ===
13 July 2014
20:45

Report

Spain	42–47 (OT)	France
Scoring by quarter: 9-6, 11-8, 2-12, 12-8, Overtime: 8-13
Pts: Lizarazu (15); Rebs: Ndour (10), Romero (11); Asts: Romero (6)		Pts: Badiane (13); Rebs: Djaldi-Tabdi (15), Badiane (10); Asts: Touré (3), Epoupa (3)

PalaIndoor, Udine
Attendance: 2 000
Referees: Elena Chernova (RUS), Maj Kazuko Forsberg (DEN), Fabiana Martinescu (ROU)

== Final standings ==
Rank	Team
1st place, gold medalist(s)	France
2nd place, silver medalist(s)	Spain
3rd place, bronze medalist(s)	Italy
4th	Serbia
5th	Latvia
6th	Poland
7th	Russia
8th	Slovakia
9th	Turkey
10th	Netherlands
11th	Czech Republic
12th	Ukraine
13th	Belgium
14th	Belarus
15th	Sweden
16th	Greece

2014 FIBA Europe Women's Under-20 Championship winners

France
Third title

Team relegated to 2015 FIBA Europe Under-20 Championship for Women Division B
