= 2013 FIBA Europe Under-20 Championship for Women Division B =

Tournament details
- Host country: Bulgaria
- City: Albena
- Dates: 4–14 July 2013
- Teams: 9 (from 1 confederation)
- Venue: 1 (in 1 host city)

Final positions
- Champions: Belgium (1st title)
- Runners-up: Czech Republic
- Third place: Latvia

Official website
- www.fibaeurope.com

The 2013 FIBA Europe Under-20 Championship for Women Division B was the ninth edition of the Division B of the Women's European basketball championship for national under-20 teams. It was held in Albena, Bulgaria, from 4 to 14 July 2013. Belgium women's national under-20 basketball team won the tournament.

== Participating teams ==
- Belgium
- Bulgaria
- Czech Republic
- Great Britain ▼ (16th place, 2012 FIBA Europe Under-20 Championship for Women Division A)
- Israel
- Latvia ▼ (15th place, 2012 FIBA Europe Under-20 Championship for Women Division A)
- Macedonia
- Portugal ▼ (14th place, 2012 FIBA Europe Under-20 Championship for Women Division A)
- Romania

== Final standings ==
Pos	Team	Pld	W	L	PF	PA	PD	Pts	Promotion
1	Belgium	8	8	0	564	438	+126	16	2014 FIBA Europe Under-20 Championship for Women Division A
2	Czech Republic	8	7	1	565	437	+128	15	2014 FIBA Europe Under-20 Championship for Women Division A
3	Latvia	8	5	3	555	461	+94	13	2014 FIBA Europe Under-20 Championship for Women Division A
4	Portugal	8	4	4	465	444	+21	12	
5	Bulgaria	8	4	4	545	520	+25	12	
6	Israel	8	3	5	402	503	−101	11	
7	Macedonia	8	3	5	446	507	−61	11	
8	Great Britain	8	2	6	444	565	−121	10	
9	Romania	8	0	8	473	584	−111	8	

Source: FIBA Archive

== Results ==
4 July 2013

Boxscore

Portugal	66–38	Israel

4 July 2013

Boxscore

Macedonia	60–57	Great Britain

4 July 2013

Boxscore

Bulgaria	67–70	Belgium

4 July 2013

Boxscore

Czech Republic	67–59	Latvia

5 July 2013

Boxscore

Belgium	73–62	Czech Republic

5 July 2013

Boxscore

Great Britain	67–86	Bulgaria

5 July 2013

Boxscore

Israel	66–48	Macedonia

5 July 2013

Boxscore

Romania	64–67	Portugal

6 July 2013

Boxscore

Macedonia	72–54	Romania

6 July 2013

Boxscore

Bulgaria	69–57	Israel

6 July 2013

Boxscore

Czech Republic	96–50	Great Britain

6 July 2013

Boxscore

Latvia	65–70	Belgium

8 July 2013

Boxscore

Great Britain	51–67	Latvia

8 July 2013

Boxscore

Israel	34–74	Czech Republic

8 July 2013

Boxscore

Romania	54–74	Bulgaria

8 July 2013

Boxscore

Portugal	55–53	Macedonia

9 July 2013

Boxscore

Bulgaria	56–68	Portugal

9 July 2013

Boxscore

Czech Republic	74–62	Romania

9 July 2013

Boxscore

Latvia	83–52	Israel

9 July 2013

Boxscore

Belgium	79–42	Great Britain

10 July 2013

Boxscore

Israel	39–61	Belgium

10 July 2013

Boxscore

Romania	55–93	Latvia

10 July 2013

Boxscore

Portugal	51–58	Czech Republic

10 July 2013

Boxscore

Macedonia	64–60	Bulgaria

12 July 2013

Boxscore

Czech Republic	65–49	Macedonia

12 July 2013

Boxscore

Latvia	46–44	Portugal

12 July 2013

Boxscore

Belgium	68–58	Romania

12 July 2013

Boxscore

Great Britain	43–49	Israel

13 July 2013

Boxscore

Romania	67–69	Great Britain

13 July 2013

Boxscore

Portugal	53–64	Belgium

13 July 2013

Boxscore

Macedonia	48–71	Latvia

13 July 2013

Boxscore

Bulgaria	59–69	Czech Republic

14 July 2013

Boxscore

Latvia	71–74	Bulgaria

14 July 2013

Boxscore

Belgium	79–52	Macedonia

14 July 2013

Boxscore

Great Britain	65–61	Portugal

14 July 2013

Boxscore

Israel	67–59	Romania
