= 2009 FIBA Europe Under-20 Championship for Women Division B =

Tournament details
- Host country: Republic of Macedonia
- City: Ohrid
- Dates: 6–15 July 2009
- Teams: 11 (from 1 confederation)
- Venue(s): 1 (in 1 host city)

Final positions
- Champions: Netherlands (1st title)
- Runners-up: Romania
- Third place: Belgium

Official website
- www.fibaeurope.com

The 2009 FIBA Europe Under-20 Championship for Women Division B was the fifth edition of the Division B of the Women's European basketball championship for national under-20 teams. It was held in Ohrid, Republic of Macedonia, from 6 to 15 July 2009. The Netherlands women's national under-20 basketball team won the tournament.

== Participating teams ==
- Austria
- Belgium ▼ (15th place, 2008 FIBA Europe Under-20 Championship for Women Division A)
- Great Britain
- Greece ▼ (16th place, 2008 FIBA Europe Under-20 Championship for Women Division A)
- Hungary
- Israel
- Macedonia
- Netherlands
- Portugal
- Romania
- Slovakia

== First round ==
In the first round, the teams were drawn into two groups. The first four teams from each group advance to the quarterfinals, the other teams will play in the classification round for 9th to 11th place.

=== Group A ===
Pos	Team	Pld	W	L	PF	PA	PD	Pts	Qualification
1	Belgium	5	5	0	359	298	+61	10	Quarterfinals
2	Hungary	5	4	1	334	272	+62	9	Quarterfinals
3	Greece	5	2	3	282	300	−18	7	Quarterfinals
4	Portugal	5	2	3	280	286	−6	7	Quarterfinals
5	Great Britain	5	2	3	289	294	−5	7	Classification round for 9th–11th place
6	Austria	5	0	5	233	327	−94	5	Classification round for 9th–11th place

Source: FIBA Archive

6 July 2009

Boxscore

Portugal	71–46	Austria

6 July 2009

Boxscore

Greece	71–59	Great Britain

6 July 2009

Boxscore

Hungary	68–74	Belgium

7 July 2009

Boxscore

Austria	41–44	Greece

7 July 2009

Boxscore

Belgium	64–56	Portugal

7 July 2009

Boxscore

Great Britain	47–63	Hungary

8 July 2009

Boxscore

Belgium	80–48	Austria

8 July 2009

Boxscore

Hungary	66–53	Greece

8 July 2009

Boxscore

Portugal	47–53	Great Britain

10 July 2009

Boxscore

Austria	52–68	Hungary

10 July 2009

Boxscore

Great Britain	66–67	Belgium

10 July 2009

Boxscore

Greece	54–60	Portugal

11 July 2009

Boxscore

Great Britain	64–46	Austria

11 July 2009

Boxscore

Portugal	46–69	Hungary

11 July 2009

Boxscore

Belgium	74–60	Greece

=== Group B ===
Pos	Team	Pld	W	L	PF	PA	PD	Pts	Qualification
1	Slovakia	4	4	0	346	288	+58	8	Quarterfinals
2	Romania	4	3	1	324	281	+43	7	Quarterfinals
3	Netherlands	4	2	2	324	271	+53	6	Quarterfinals
4	Israel	4	1	3	296	333	−37	5	Quarterfinals
5	Macedonia	4	0	4	227	344	−117	4	Classification round for 9th–11th place

Source: FIBA Archive

6 July 2009

Boxscore

Netherlands	63–79	Romania

6 July 2009

Boxscore

Israel	83–94	Slovakia

7 July 2009

Boxscore

Macedonia	60–76	Israel

7 July 2009

Boxscore

Slovakia	88–78	Netherlands

8 July 2009

Boxscore

Romania	72–73	Slovakia

8 July 2009

Boxscore

Netherlands	84–36	Macedonia

10 July 2009

Boxscore

Israel	68–99	Netherlands

10 July 2009

Boxscore

Macedonia	76–93	Romania

11 July 2009

Boxscore

Slovakia	91–55	Macedonia

11 July 2009

Boxscore

Romania	80–69	Israel

== Classification round for 9th–11th place ==
Pos	Team	Pld	W	L	PF	PA	PD	Pts
9	Great Britain	2	2	0	149	103	+46	4
10	Austria	2	1	1	114	126	−12	3
11	Macedonia	2	0	2	119	153	−34	2

Source: FIBA Archive

13 July 2009

Boxscore

Austria	68–62	Macedonia

14 July 2009

Boxscore

Macedonia	57–85	Great Britain

== Championship playoffs ==
Fifth place
A3	Greece	47
A4	Portugal	42
Seventh place
B4	Israel	64
A2	Hungary	83

Consolation semifinals
B4	Israel	71
A3	Greece	73
A4	Portugal	57
A2	Hungary	56

Quarterfinals
A1	Belgium	85
B4	Israel	73
B2	Romania	64
A3	Greece	56
B1	Slovakia	58
A4	Portugal	48
A2	Hungary	63
B3	Netherlands	74

Semifinals
A1	Belgium	67
B2	Romania	81
B1	Slovakia	66
B3	Netherlands	75

Final
B2	Romania	53
B3	Netherlands	59
Third place
A1	Belgium	94
B1	Slovakia	81

=== Quarterfinals ===
13 July 2009

Boxscore

Belgium	85–73	Israel

13 July 2009

Boxscore

Hungary	63–74	Netherlands

13 July 2009

Boxscore

Slovakia	58–48	Portugal

13 July 2009

Boxscore

Romania	64–56	Greece

=== 5th–8th place playoffs ===
14 July 2009

Boxscore

Israel	71–73	Greece

14 July 2009

Boxscore

Portugal	57–56	Hungary

=== Semifinals ===
14 July 2009

Boxscore

Belgium	67–81	Romania

14 July 2009

Boxscore

Slovakia	66–75	Netherlands

=== 7th place match ===
15 July 2009

Boxscore

Israel	64–83	Hungary

=== 5th place match ===
15 July 2009

Boxscore

Greece	47–42	Portugal

=== 3rd place match ===
15 July 2009

Boxscore

Belgium	94–81	Slovakia

=== Final ===
15 July 2009

Boxscore

Romania	53–59	Netherlands

== Final standings ==
Team promoted to the 2010 FIBA Europe Under-20 Championship for Women Division A

Rank	Team
1st place, gold medalist(s)	Netherlands
2nd place, silver medalist(s)	Romania
3rd place, bronze medalist(s)	Belgium
4	Slovakia
5	Greece
6	Portugal
7	Hungary
8	Israel
9	Great Britain
10	Austria
11	Macedonia
