= Netherlands women's national under-20 basketball team =

Netherlands
- FIBA zone: FIBA Europe
- National federation: Basketball Nederland

U20 EuroBasket
- Appearances: 12
- Medals: (bronze) Bronze: 2 (2015, 2018)

U20 EuroBasket Division B
- Appearances: 6
- Medals: (gold) Gold: 2 (2009, 2024); (bronze) Bronze: 1 (2023)

The Netherlands women's national under-20 basketball team is a national basketball team of the Netherlands, administered by the Basketball Nederland. It represents the country in international under-20 women's basketball competitions.

== FIBA U20 Women's EuroBasket participations ==
| Year | Division A | Division B |
|---|---|---|
| 2006 | | 8th |
| 2007 | | 7th |
| 2008 | | 6th |
| 2009 | | 1st place, gold medalist(s) |
| 2010 | 10th | |
| 2011 | 10th | |
| 2012 | 4th | |
| 2013 | 10th | |
| 2014 | 10th | |

| Year | Division A | Division B |
|---|---|---|
| 2015 | 3rd place, bronze medalist(s) | |
| 2016 | 9th | |
| 2017 | 13th | |
| 2018 | 3rd place, bronze medalist(s) | |
| 2019 | 13th | |
| 2022 | 14th | |
| 2023 | | 3rd place, bronze medalist(s) |
| 2024 | | 1st place, gold medalist(s) |
| 2025 | 15th | |

== See also ==
- Netherlands women's national basketball team
- Netherlands women's national under-19 basketball team
- Netherlands men's national under-20 basketball team
