= Canik Atatürk Sports Hall =

Indoor sports venue in Canik, Samsun, Turkey

- Canik Atatürk Spor Salonu
- Location of the sports hall in Turkey.
- Location: Canik, Samsun, Turkey
- Coordinates: 41°16′14″N 36°21′13″E
- Capacity: 1,500

Tenants
- 2013 FIBA Europe Under-20 Championship for Women; 2016 FIBA Europe Under-18 Championship; 2017 Summer Deaflympics

Canik Atatürk Sports Hall (Turkish: Canik Atatürk Spor Salonu) is a multi-purpose indoor sport venue located in Canik district of Samsun Province, northern Turkey. It was named in honor of Mustafa Kemal Atatürk (1881–1938), who started the national independence movement in 1919 after setting foot in Samsun.

The venue hosts basketball, handball, volleyball, and table tennis competitions. In December 2013, a second floor was opened featuring a hall for judo, karate and taekwondo events. The sports hall has a seating capacity for 1,000 spectators, including 100 for VIP, 100 for media members, 100 for accredited sportspeople and 100 for physically handicapped people.

== International events hosted ==
2013 FIBA Europe Under-20 Championship for Women took place in the arena. In 2016, the FIBA Europe Under-18 Championship were held in the sports hall. The venue will host judo, karate and taekwondo events of the 2017 Summer Deaflympics.
