= 2010 FIBA Europe Under-20 Championship for Women Division B =

Tournament details
- Host country: Republic of Macedonia
- City: Kavadarci
- Dates: 16–25 July 2010
- Teams: 10 (from 1 confederation)
- Venue(s): 1 (in 1 host city)

Final positions
- Champions: Great Britain (1st title)
- Runners-up: Slovakia
- Third place: Czech Republic

Official website
- www.fibaeurope.com

The 2010 FIBA Europe Under-20 Championship for Women Division B was the sixth edition of the Division B of the Women's European basketball championship for national under-20 teams. It was held in Kavadarci, Republic of Macedonia, from 16 to 25 July 2010. Great Britain women's national under-20 basketball team won the tournament.

== Participating teams ==
- Austria
- Belgium
- Czech Republic ▼ (15th place, 2009 FIBA Europe Under-20 Championship for Women Division A)
- Great Britain
- Greece
- Hungary
- Israel
- Macedonia
- Portugal
- Slovakia

== First round ==
In the first round, the teams were drawn into two groups of five. The first four teams from each group advance to the quarterfinals, the last teams will play for the 9th place.

=== Group A ===
Pos	Team	Pld	W	L	PF	PA	PD	Pts	Qualification
1	Portugal	4	4	0	283	194	+89	8	Quarterfinals
2	Slovakia	4	3	1	256	206	+50	7	Quarterfinals
3	Israel	4	2	2	222	222	0	6	Quarterfinals
4	Greece	4	1	3	168	258	−90	5	Quarterfinals
5	Austria	4	0	4	201	250	−49	4	9th place playoff

Source: FIBA Archive

16 July 2010

Boxscore

Israel	62–44	Greece

16 July 2010

Boxscore

Slovakia	68–72	Portugal

17 July 2010

Boxscore

Austria	44–65	Slovakia

17 July 2010

Boxscore

Portugal	60–46	Israel

18 July 2010

Boxscore

Greece	32–82	Portugal

18 July 2010

Boxscore

Israel	61–58	Austria

20 July 2010

Boxscore

Slovakia	60–53	Israel

20 July 2010

Boxscore

Austria	51–55	Greece

21 July 2010

Boxscore

Portugal	69–48	Austria

21 July 2010

Boxscore

Greece	37–63	Slovakia

=== Group B ===
Pos	Team	Pld	W	L	PF	PA	PD	Pts	Qualification
1	Czech Republic	4	4	0	311	228	+83	8	Quarterfinals
2	Great Britain	4	3	1	243	233	+10	7	Quarterfinals
3	Hungary	4	2	2	271	241	+30	6	Quarterfinals
4	Belgium	4	1	3	208	287	−79	5	Quarterfinals
5	Macedonia	4	0	4	234	278	−44	4	9th place playoff

Source: FIBA Archive

16 July 2010

Boxscore

Great Britain	61–42	Belgium

16 July 2010

Boxscore

Czech Republic	81–72	Hungary

17 July 2010

Boxscore

Macedonia	61–72	Czech Republic

17 July 2010

Boxscore

Hungary	50–54	Great Britain

18 July 2010

Boxscore

Belgium	65–77	Hungary

18 July 2010

Boxscore

Great Britain	70–69	Macedonia

20 July 2010

Boxscore

Czech Republic	72–58	Great Britain

20 July 2010

Boxscore

Macedonia	63–64	Belgium

21 July 2010

Boxscore

Hungary	72–41	Macedonia

21 July 2010

Boxscore

Belgium	37–86	Czech Republic

== 9th place playoff ==
22 July 2010

Boxscore

Austria	71–62	Macedonia

24 July 2010

Boxscore

Macedonia	78–60	Austria

== Championship playoffs ==
Fifth place
A3	Israel	60
B3	Hungary	85
Seventh place
B4	Belgium	58
A4	Greece	52

Consolation semifinals
B4	Belgium	57
A3	Israel	61
B3	Hungary	56
A4	Greece	31

Quarterfinals
A1	Portugal	59
B4	Belgium	40
B2	Great Britain	72
A3	Israel	65
A2	Slovakia	49
B3	Hungary	46
B1	Czech Republic	71
A4	Greece	37

Semifinals
A1	Portugal	40
B2	Great Britain	59
A2	Slovakia	53
B1	Czech Republic	50

Final
B2	Great Britain	47
A2	Slovakia	46
Third place
A1	Portugal	47
B1	Czech Republic	61

=== Quarterfinals ===
23 July 2010

Boxscore

Portugal	59–40	Belgium

23 July 2010

Boxscore

Slovakia	49–46	Hungary

23 July 2010

Boxscore

Czech Republic	71–37	Greece

23 July 2010

Boxscore

Great Britain	72–65	Israel

=== 5th–8th place playoffs ===
24 July 2010

Boxscore

Belgium	57–61	Israel

24 July 2010

Boxscore

Hungary	56–31	Greece

=== Semifinals ===
24 July 2010

Boxscore

Portugal	40–59	Great Britain

24 July 2010

Boxscore

Slovakia	53–50	Czech Republic

=== 7th place match ===
25 July 2010

Boxscore

Belgium	58–52	Greece

=== 5th place match ===
25 July 2010

Boxscore

Israel	60–85	Hungary

=== 3rd place match ===
25 July 2010

Boxscore

Portugal	47–61	Czech Republic

=== Final ===
25 July 2010

Boxscore

Great Britain	47–46	Slovakia

== Final standings ==
Team promoted to the 2011 FIBA Europe Under-20 Championship for Women Division A

Rank	Team
1st place, gold medalist(s)	Great Britain
2nd place, silver medalist(s)	Slovakia
3rd place, bronze medalist(s)	Czech Republic
4	Portugal
5	Hungary
6	Israel
7	Belgium
8	Greece
9	Macedonia
10	Austria
