= Austria women's national under-20 basketball team =

Austria
- FIBA zone: FIBA Europe
- National federation: Austrian Basketball Federation

U20 EuroBasket
- Appearances: None

U20 EuroBasket Division B
- Appearances: 6
- Medals: None

The Austria women's national under-20 basketball team is a national basketball team of Austria, administered by the Austrian Basketball Federation. It represents the country in women's international under-20 basketball competitions.

== FIBA U20 Women's EuroBasket participations ==
Year	Result in Division B
2009	10th
2010	10th
2011	9th
2015	6th
2023	15th
2024	14th

== See also ==
- Austria women's national basketball team
- Austria women's national under-18 basketball team
- Austria men's national under-20 basketball team
