= Georgia women's national under-20 basketball team =

Georgia
- FIBA zone: FIBA Europe
- National federation: Georgian Basketball Federation

U20 European Championship
- Appearances: None

U20 European Championship Division B
- Appearances: 2
- Medals: None

The Georgia women's national under-20 basketball team is a national basketball team of Georgia, administered by the Georgian Basketball Federation. It represents the country in women's international under-20 basketball competitions.

== FIBA U20 Women's European Championship participations ==
Year	Result in Division B
2022	18th
2023	16th

== Results ==
28 July 2023 Romania 102–44 Georgia

30 July 2023 Georgia 30–107 Greece

== See also ==
- Georgia women's national basketball team
- Georgia women's national under-18 basketball team
- Georgia men's national under-20 basketball team
