= Norway women's national under-20 basketball team =

National basketball team of Norway Under-20

Norway
- FIBA zone: FIBA Europe
- National federation: Norwegian Basketball Association

U20 European Championship
- Appearances: None

U20 European Championship Division B
- Appearances: 3
- Medals: None

The Norway women's national under-20 basketball team is a national basketball team of Norway, administered by the Norwegian Basketball Association. It represents the country in women's international under-20 basketball competitions.

== FIBA U20 Women's European Championship participations ==
Year	Division A	Division B
2002	DNQ	
2014		9th
2022		7th
2023		7th

== See also ==
- Norway women's national basketball team
- Norway women's national under-18 basketball team
- Norway men's national under-20 basketball team
