= Alena Holubeva =

Belarusian basketball player

No. 19 – Olimpia Grodno
- Position: Point guard
- League: BPL

Personal information
- Born: 4 April 1994 (age 30); Grodno, Belarus
- Listed height: 5 ft 10 in (1.78 m)

Alena Holubeva (Belarusian: Алёна Голубева, born 4 April 1994), is a Belarusian basketball player for Olimpia Grodno and the Belarusian national team. Holubeva was also known as Alena Karasevich, after she married basketball player Pavel Karasevich.

She participated at the EuroBasket Women 2017.
