= 2023 FIBA U20 Women's European Championship Division B =

Basketball tournament held in Romania

Tournament details
- Host country: Romania
- City: Craiova, Ișalnița
- Dates: 28 July – 6 August 2023
- Teams: 17 (from 1 confederation)
- Venues: 2 (in 2 host cities)

Final positions
- Champions: Slovenia (2nd title)
- Runners-up: Germany
- Third place: Netherlands

Official website
- www.fiba.basketball

The 2023 FIBA U20 Women's European Championship Division B was the 17th edition of the Division B of the European basketball championship for women's national under-20 teams. It was played from 28 July to 6 August 2023 in Craiova and Ișalnița, Romania. Slovenia women's national under-20 basketball team won the tournament.

== Participating teams ==
- Austria
- Bulgaria ▼ (15th place, 2022 FIBA U20 Women's European Championship Division A)
- Croatia
- Georgia
- Germany
- Great Britain
- Greece
- Iceland
- Ireland ▼ (16th place, 2022 FIBA U20 Women's European Championship Division A)
- Kosovo
- Netherlands ▼ (14th place, 2022 FIBA U20 Women's European Championship Division A)
- Norway
- Romania
- Slovakia
- Slovenia
- Switzerland
- Ukraine

== First round ==
The draw of the first round was held on 14 February 2023 in Freising, Germany.

In the first round, the teams were drawn into four groups. The first two teams from each group advance to the quarterfinals; the other teams will play in the 9th–17th place classification groups.

All times are local (Eastern European Summer Time – UTC+3).

=== Group A ===
Pos	Team	Pld	W	L	PF	PA	PD	Pts	Qualification
1	Germany	3	3	0	209	152	+57	6	Quarterfinals
2	Switzerland	3	2	1	196	202	−6	5	Quarterfinals
3	Great Britain	3	1	2	176	191	−15	4	9th–17th place classification
4	Ukraine	3	0	3	176	213	−37	3	9th–17th place classification

Source: FIBA

28 July 2023
13:00

Boxscore

Germany	75–55	Switzerland

Polyvalent Hall, Craiova

28 July 2023
15:30

Boxscore

Ukraine	54–74	Great Britain

Polyvalent Hall, Craiova

30 July 2023
13:00

Boxscore

Switzerland	70–66	Ukraine

Sala de sport, Ișalnița

30 July 2023
15:30

Boxscore

Great Britain	41–65	Germany

Polyvalent Hall, Craiova

2 August 2023
15:30

Boxscore

Germany	69–56	Ukraine

Sala de sport, Ișalnița

2 August 2023
18:00

Boxscore

Great Britain	61–72	Switzerland

Sala de sport, Ișalnița

=== Group B ===
Pos	Team	Pld	W	L	PF	PA	PD	Pts	Qualification
1	Ireland	3	3	0	229	196	+33	6	Quarterfinals
2	Romania	3	2	1	237	177	+60	5	Quarterfinals
3	Greece	3	1	2	247	181	+66	4	9th–17th place classification
4	Georgia	3	0	3	132	291	−159	3	9th–17th place classification

Source: FIBA

28 July 2023
18:00

Boxscore

Romania	102–44	Georgia

Polyvalent Hall, Craiova

28 July 2023
20:30

Boxscore

Greece	74–80	Ireland

Polyvalent Hall, Craiova

30 July 2023
18:00

Boxscore

Georgia	30–107	Greece

Sala de sport, Ișalnița

30 July 2023
18:00

Boxscore

Ireland	67–64	Romania

Polyvalent Hall, Craiova

2 August 2023
13:00

Boxscore

Ireland	82–58	Georgia

Sala de sport, Ișalnița

2 August 2023
18:00

Boxscore

Romania	71–66	Greece

Polyvalent Hall, Craiova

=== Group C ===
Pos	Team	Pld	W	L	PF	PA	PD	Pts	Qualification
1	Slovenia	3	2	1	199	162	+37	5	Quarterfinals
2	Netherlands	3	2	1	207	177	+30	5	Quarterfinals
3	Croatia	3	2	1	210	175	+35	5	9th–17th place classification
4	Kosovo	3	0	3	149	251	−102	3	9th–17th place classification

Source: FIBA

28 July 2023
13:00

Boxscore

Netherlands	87–57	Kosovo

Sala de sport, Ișalnița

28 July 2023
15:30

Boxscore

Croatia	56–69	Slovenia

Sala de sport, Ișalnița

30 July 2023
13:00

Boxscore

Kosovo	43–85	Croatia

Polyvalent Hall, Craiova

30 July 2023
20:30

Boxscore

Slovenia	51–57	Netherlands

Polyvalent Hall, Craiova

2 August 2023
15:30

Boxscore

Netherlands	63–69	Croatia

Polyvalent Hall, Craiova

2 August 2023
20:30

Boxscore

Slovenia	79–49	Kosovo

Sala de sport, Ișalnița

=== Group D ===
Pos	Team	Pld	W	L	PF	PA	PD	Pts	Qualification
1	Norway	4	4	0	280	212	+68	8	Quarterfinals
2	Iceland	4	3	1	249	208	+41	7	Quarterfinals
3	Slovakia	4	2	2	235	246	−11	6	9th–17th place classification
4	Bulgaria	4	1	3	236	267	−31	5	9th–17th place classification
5	Austria	4	0	4	143	188	−45	4	9th–17th place classification

Source: FIBA

28 July 2023
18:00

Boxscore

Iceland	72–40	Austria

Sala de sport, Ișalnița

28 July 2023
20:30

Boxscore

Norway	80–61	Slovakia

Sala de sport, Ișalnița

29 July 2023
15:30

Boxscore

Slovakia	54–57	Iceland

Polyvalent Hall, Craiova

29 July 2023
18:00

Boxscore

Bulgaria	53–65	Norway

Polyvalent Hall, Craiova

30 July 2023
15:30

Boxscore

Austria	49–57	Slovakia

Sala de sport, Ișalnița

30 July 2023
20:30

Boxscore

Iceland	75–64	Bulgaria

Sala de sport, Ișalnița

1 August 2023
15:30

Boxscore

Norway	54–45	Iceland

Polyvalent Hall, Craiova

1 August 2023
18:00

Boxscore

Bulgaria	59–54	Austria

Polyvalent Hall, Craiova

2 August 2023
13:00

Boxscore

Slovakia	73–60	Bulgaria

Polyvalent Hall, Craiova

2 August 2023
20:30

Boxscore

Austria	53–81	Norway

Polyvalent Hall, Craiova

== 9th–17th place classification ==
=== Group E ===
Pos	Team	Pld	W	L	PF	PA	PD	Pts	Qualification
1	Greece	3	3	0	251	138	+113	6	9th place match
2	Great Britain	3	2	1	209	165	+44	5	11th place match
3	Ukraine	3	1	2	197	190	+7	4	13th place match
4	Georgia	3	0	3	113	277	−164	3	15th place match

First match(es) will be played: 4 August 2023. Source: FIBA

4 August 2023
13:00

Boxscore

Great Britain	78–44	Georgia

Sala de sport, Ișalnița

4 August 2023
15:30

Boxscore

Greece	77–51	Ukraine

Sala de sport, Ișalnița

5 August 2023
15:30

Boxscore

Great Britain	57–67	Greece

Sala de sport, Ișalnița

5 August 2023
18:00

Boxscore

Ukraine	92–39	Georgia

Sala de sport, Ișalnița

=== Group F ===
Pos	Team	Pld	W	L	PF	PA	PD	Pts	Qualification
1	Croatia	4	4	0	315	242	+73	8	9th place match
2	Slovakia	4	3	1	280	214	+66	7	11th place match
3	Bulgaria	4	2	2	270	266	+4	6	13th place match
4	Austria	4	1	3	257	246	+11	5	15th place match
5	Kosovo	4	0	4	187	341	−154	4	17th place

First match(es) will be played: 3 August 2023. Source: FIBA

3 August 2023
15:30

Boxscore

Croatia	77–71	Bulgaria

Polyvalent Hall, Craiova

3 August 2023
18:00

Boxscore

Slovakia	93–32	Kosovo

Polyvalent Hall, Craiova

4 August 2023
18:00

Boxscore

Austria	71–80	Croatia

Sala de sport, Ișalnița

4 August 2023
20:30

Boxscore

Kosovo	62–80	Bulgaria

Sala de sport, Ișalnița

5 August 2023
13:00

Boxscore

Croatia	73–57	Slovakia

Sala de sport, Ișalnița

5 August 2023
20:30

Boxscore

Kosovo	50–83	Austria

Sala de sport, Ișalnița

=== 15th place match ===
6 August 2023
11:00

Boxscore

Georgia	55–61	Austria

Sala de sport, Ișalnița

=== 13th place match ===
6 August 2023
13:30

Boxscore

Ukraine	64–70	Bulgaria

Sala de sport, Ișalnița

=== 11th place match ===
6 August 2023
16:00

Boxscore

Great Britain	59–68	Slovakia

Sala de sport, Ișalnița

=== 9th place match ===
6 August 2023
18:30

Boxscore

Greece	77–81	Croatia

Sala de sport, Ișalnița

== Championship playoffs ==
5th place match
Romania	69
Iceland	59
7th place match
Norway	83
Ireland	77

5th–8th place semifinals
Romania	71
Norway	60
Ireland	67
Iceland	79

Quarterfinals
A1	Germany	75
B2	Romania	39
D1	Norway	59
C2	Netherlands	86
B1	Ireland	58
A2	Switzerland	71
C1	Slovenia	79
D2	Iceland	51

Semifinals
Germany	81
Netherlands	73
Switzerland	53
Slovenia	91

Final
Germany	47
Slovenia	57
3rd place match
Netherlands	68
Switzerland	51

=== Quarterfinals ===
4 August 2023
13:00

Boxscore

Ireland	58–71	Switzerland

Polyvalent Hall, Craiova

4 August 2023
15:30

Boxscore

Slovenia	79–51	Iceland

Polyvalent Hall, Craiova

4 August 2023
18:00

Boxscore

Germany	75–39	Romania

Polyvalent Hall, Craiova

4 August 2023
20:30

Boxscore

Norway	59–86	Netherlands

Polyvalent Hall, Craiova

=== 5th–8th place semifinals ===
5 August 2023
13:00

Boxscore

Ireland	67–79	Iceland

Polyvalent Hall, Craiova

5 August 2023
15:30

Boxscore

Romania	71–60	Norway

Polyvalent Hall, Craiova

=== Semifinals ===
5 August 2023
18:00

Boxscore

Switzerland	53–91	Slovenia

Polyvalent Hall, Craiova

5 August 2023
20:30

Boxscore

Germany	81–73	Netherlands

Polyvalent Hall, Craiova

=== 7th place match ===
6 August 2023
13:00

Boxscore

Norway	83–77	Ireland

Polyvalent Hall, Craiova

=== 5th place match ===
6 August 2023
15:30

Boxscore

Romania	69–59	Iceland

Polyvalent Hall, Craiova

=== 3rd place match ===
6 August 2023
18:00

Boxscore

Netherlands	68–51	Switzerland

Polyvalent Hall, Craiova

=== Final ===
6 August 2023
20:30

Boxscore

Germany	47–57	Slovenia
Scoring by quarter: 13-9, 15-22, 17-9, 2-17

Polyvalent Hall, Craiova

== Final standings ==
Rank	Team
1st place, gold medalist(s)	Slovenia
2nd place, silver medalist(s)	Germany
3rd place, bronze medalist(s)	Netherlands
4	Switzerland
5	Romania
6	Iceland
7	Norway
8	Ireland
9	Croatia
10	Greece
11	Slovakia
12	Great Britain
13	Bulgaria
14	Ukraine
15	Austria
16	Georgia
17	Kosovo

Promoted to the 2024 FIBA U20 Women's EuroBasket Division A
