= Greece women's national under-20 basketball team =

National basketball team of Greece

Greece
- FIBA zone: FIBA Europe
- National federation: Hellenic Basketball Federation

U20 EuroBasket
- Appearances: 8
- Medals: None

U20 EuroBasket Division B
- Appearances: 12
- Medals: (gold) Gold: 1 (2012); (silver) Silver: 1 (2015); (bronze) Bronze: 1 (2011)

The Greece women's national under-20 basketball team is a national basketball team of Greece, administered by the Hellenic Basketball Federation. It represents the country in international under-20 women's basketball competitions.

== FIBA U20 Women's EuroBasket participations ==
Year	Division A	Division B
2002	7th	
2005	4th	
2006	8th	
2007	10th	
2008	16th	
2009		5th
2010		8th
2011		3rd place, bronze medalist(s)
2012		1st place, gold medalist(s)
2013	9th	

Year	Division A	Division B
2014	16th	
2015		2nd place, silver medalist(s)
2016	14th	
2017		5th
2018		9th
2019		11th
2022		5th
2023		10th
2024		9th
2025		6th

== See also ==
- Greece women's national basketball team
- Greece women's national under-18 basketball team
- Greece men's national under-20 basketball team
