= Sarah Ousfar =

French basketball player

Sarah Ousfar (born July 28, 1993 in Lille, France) is a French basketball player who plays for club Basket Landes of the League feminine de basket, the top league of basketball for women in France.
