= North Macedonia women's national under-20 basketball team =

National basketball team of North Macedonia

North Macedonia
- FIBA zone: FIBA Europe
- National federation: Basketball Federation of North Macedonia

U20 European Championship
- Appearances: None

U20 European Championship Division B
- Appearances: 5
- Medals: None

The North Macedonia women's national under-20 basketball team is a national basketball team of North Macedonia, administered by the Basketball Federation of North Macedonia. It represents the country in women's international under-20 basketball competitions.

== FIBA U20 Women's European Championship participations ==
Year	Result in Division B
2009	11th
2010	9th
2011	11th
2013	7th
2022	8th

== See also ==
- North Macedonia women's national basketball team
- North Macedonia women's national under-18 basketball team
- North Macedonia men's national under-20 basketball team
