= Kosovo women's national under-20 basketball team =

National basketball team of Kosovo

Kosovo
- FIBA zone: FIBA Europe
- National federation: Kosovo Basketball Federation

U20 European Championship
- Appearances: None

U20 European Championship Division B
- Appearances: 3
- Medals: None

The Kosovo women's national under-20 basketball team is a national basketball team of Kosovo, administered by the Kosovo Basketball Federation. It represents the country in women's international under-20 basketball competitions.

== FIBA U20 Women's European Championship participations ==
Year	Result in Division B
2019	12th
2022	15th
2023	17th

== See also ==
- Kosovo women's national basketball team
- Kosovo women's national under-18 basketball team
- Kosovo men's national under-20 basketball team
