= Dubravka Dačić =

Slovenian-Italian basketball player (born 1985)

Personal information
- Born: 6 May 1985 (age 41) Koper, SFR Yugoslavia
- Listed height: 1.98 m (6 ft 6 in)

Career information
- WNBA draft: 2007: undrafted
- Position: Center

Career history
- 2002–2007: Basket Parma
- 2007–2008: Dynamo Moscow
- 2008–2009: Ros Casares Valencia
- 2009–2010: Besiktas
- 2010–2012: Taranto Cras Basket
- 2012: Antakya
- 2013–2015: Dike Basket Napoli
- 2016–present: CB Al-Qazeres

Dubravka Dačić (born 6 May 1985) is a Slovenian-Italian female professional basketball player.
