= Russia women's national under-20 basketball team =

Youth basketball team representing Russia

Russia
- FIBA zone: FIBA Europe
- National federation: Russian Basketball Federation

U21 World Championship
- Appearances: 2
- Medals: None

U20 European Championship
- Appearances: 18
- Medals: Gold: 5 (2000, 2004, 2006, 2008, 2010); Silver: 4 (2002, 2011, 2012, 2019); Bronze: 2 (2016, 2017)

The Russia women's national under-20 basketball team is a national basketball team of Russia, administered by the Russian Basketball Federation. It represented the country in women's international under-20 basketball competitions.

After the 2022 Russian invasion of Ukraine, FIBA banned Russian teams and officials from participating in FIBA basketball competitions.

== FIBA U20 Women's European Championship participations ==
Year	Result in Division A
2000	1st place, gold medalist(s)
2002	2nd place, silver medalist(s)
2004	1st place, gold medalist(s)
2005	11th
2006	1st place, gold medalist(s)
2007	7th
2008	1st place, gold medalist(s)
2009	4th
2010	1st place, gold medalist(s)

Year	Result in Division A
2011	2nd place, silver medalist(s)
2012	2nd place, silver medalist(s)
2013	6th
2014	7th
2015	4th
2016	3rd place, bronze medalist(s)
2017	3rd place, bronze medalist(s)
2018	13th
2019	2nd place, silver medalist(s)

== FIBA Under-21 World Championship for Women participations ==
Year	Result
2003	6th
2007	4th

== See also ==
- Russia women's national basketball team
- Russia women's national under-19 basketball team
