= Armenia women's national under-20 basketball team =

National basketball team of Armenia

Armenia
- FIBA zone: FIBA Europe
- National federation: Armenian Basketball Federation

U20 European Championship
- Appearances: None

U20 European Championship Division B
- Appearances: 1
- Medals: None

The Armenia women's national under-20 basketball team is a national basketball team of Armenia, administered by the Armenian Basketball Federation. It represents the country in women's international under-20 basketball competitions.

The team finished 16th at the 2022 FIBA U20 Women's European Championship Division B.

== See also ==
- Armenia women's national under-18 basketball team
- Armenia women's national under-16 basketball team
- Armenia men's national under-20 basketball team
