= Slovakia women's national under-20 basketball team =

National basketball team of Slovakia

Slovakia
- FIBA zone: FIBA Europe
- National federation: Slovak Basketball Association

U20 EuroBasket
- Appearances: 10
- Medals: None

U20 EuroBasket Division B
- Appearances: 9
- Medals: (silver) Silver: 2 (2010, 2017); (bronze) Bronze: 1 (2006)

The Slovakia women's national under-20 basketball team is a national basketball team of Slovakia, administered by the Slovak Basketball Association. It represents the country in international under-20 women's basketball competitions.

== FIBA U20 Women's EuroBasket participations ==
Year	Division A	Division B
2000	8th	
2002	9th	
2004	7th	
2006		3rd place, bronze medalist(s)
2008		4th
2009		4th
2010		2nd place, silver medalist(s)
2011	13th	
2012	12th	
2013	7th	

Year	Division A	Division B
2014	8th	
2015	8th	
2016	15th	
2017		2nd place, silver medalist(s)
2018	15th	
2022		13th
2023		11th
2024		12th
2025		5th

== See also ==
- Slovakia women's national basketball team
- Slovakia women's national under-19 basketball team
- Slovakia men's national under-20 basketball team
