= 2012 FIBA Europe Under-20 Championship for Women =

2012 FIBA U20 Women's European Championship
11th FIBA Under-20 Women's European Basketball Championship

Tournament details
- Host country: Hungary
- Dates: 16–26 August 2012
- Teams: 16
- Venues: 2 (in 1 host city)

Final positions
- Champions: Spain (3rd title)

Tournament statistics
- MVP: (Spain) Queralt Casas

Official website
- www.fibaeurope.com

The 2012 FIBA Europe Under-20 Championship for Women was the 11th edition of the FIBA Europe Under-20 Championship for Women. 16 teams participated in the competition, held at the Főnix Hall and Stadion Oláh Gábor Út in Debrecen, Hungary, from 16 to 26 August 2012. Spain won the tournament and became the European champions for the third time.

== Participating teams ==
- Belarus
- France
- Great Britain
- Italy
- Latvia
- Lithuania
- Netherlands
- Poland
- Portugal ▲ (Runners-up, 2011 FIBA Europe Under-20 Championship for Women Division B)
- Russia
- Serbia
- Slovakia
- Spain
- Sweden ▲ (Winners, 2011 FIBA Europe Under-20 Championship for Women Division B)
- Turkey
- Ukraine

== Final standings ==
Rank	Team
1st place, gold medalist(s)	Spain
2nd place, silver medalist(s)	Russia
3rd place, bronze medalist(s)	Turkey
4th	Netherlands
5th	France
6th	Sweden
7th	Ukraine
8th	Belarus
9th	Lithuania
10th	Poland
11th	Serbia
12th	Slovakia
13th	Italy
14th	Portugal
15th	Latvia
16th	Great Britain

2012 FIBA Europe Women's Under-20 Championship winners

Spain
Third title

Most Valuable Player
(Spain) Queralt Casas

Team relegated to 2013 FIBA Europe Under-20 Championship for Women Division B
