= Portugal women's national under-20 basketball team =

National basketball team of Portugal

Portugal
- FIBA zone: FIBA Europe
- National federation: Portuguese Basketball Federation

U20 EuroBasket
- Appearances: 10
- Medals: None

U20 EuroBasket Division B
- Appearances: 9
- Medals: (silver) Silver: 1 (2011); (bronze) Bronze: 1 (2014)

The Portugal women's national under-20 basketball team is a national basketball team of Portugal, administered by the Portuguese Basketball Federation. It represents the country in international under-20 women's basketball competitions.

== FIBA U20 Women's EuroBasket participations ==
Year	Division A	Division B
2005		7th
2006		6th
2007		4th
2008		9th
2009		6th
2010		4th
2011		2nd place, silver medalist(s)
2012	14th	
2013		4th
2014		3rd place, bronze medalist(s)

Year	Division A	Division B
2015	6th	
2016	10th	
2017	12th	
2018	7th	
2019	14th	
2022	6th	
2023	6th	
2024	11th	
2025	14th	

== See also ==
- Portugal women's national basketball team
- Portugal women's national under-18 basketball team
- Portugal men's national under-20 basketball team
