= 2018 FIBA U20 Women's European Championship =

17th FIBA Under-20 Women's European Basketball Championship

Tournament details
- Host country: Hungary
- Dates: 7 – 15 July 2018
- Teams: 16 (from 1 federation)
- Venue: 1 (in 1 host city)

Final positions
- Champions: Spain (8th title)

Tournament statistics
- MVP: (Spain) Iris Junio
- Top scorer: (Germany) Sabally (20.7)
- Top rebounds: (Germany) Sabally (10.0)
- Top assists: (Hungary) Studer (6.7)
- PPG (Team): (Russia) (79.1)
- RPG (Team): (France) (48.7)
- APG (Team): (Russia) (19.9)

Official website
- www.fiba.basketball

The 2018 FIBA U20 Women's European Championship was the 17th edition of the Women's U-20 European basketball championship. 16 teams participated in the competition, which was played in Sopron, Hungary, from 7 to 15 July 2018.

== Venues ==
2018 FIBA U20 Women's European Championship is located in Hungary	Sopron
2018 FIBA U20 Women's European Championship is located in Hungary	Novomatic Arena Sopron
2018 FIBA U20 Women's European Championship is located in Hungary	Capacity: 2,000

== Participating teams ==
- Belgium
- Croatia ▲ (3rd place, 2017 FIBA U20 Women's European Championship Division B)
- France
- Germany ▲ (Winners, 2017 FIBA U20 Women's European Championship Division B)
- Hungary
- Italy
- Latvia
- Netherlands
- Poland
- Portugal
- Russia
- Serbia
- Slovakia ▲ (Runners-up, 2017 FIBA U20 Women's European Championship Division B)
- Slovenia
- Spain
- Sweden

== Preliminary round ==
In this round, the 16 teams are allocated in four groups of four teams each. All teams advance to the playoff round of 16.

=== Group A ===
Pos	Team	Pld	W	L	PF	PA	PD	Pts
1	Russia	3	2	1	218	214	+4	5
2	Serbia	3	2	1	206	204	+2	5
3	Germany	3	1	2	213	208	+5	4
4	Slovenia	3	1	2	214	225	−11	4

Source: FIBA

7 July

Boxscore

Germany	67–72	Russia

7 July

Boxscore

Slovenia	65–72	Serbia

8 July

Boxscore

Germany	64–71	Serbia

8 July

Boxscore

Russia	71–84	Slovenia

9 July

Boxscore

Slovenia	65–82	Germany

9 July

Boxscore

Russia	75–63	Serbia

=== Group B ===
Pos	Team	Pld	W	L	PF	PA	PD	Pts
1	Italy	3	3	0	200	148	+52	6
2	France	3	2	1	208	154	+54	5
3	Slovakia	3	1	2	146	188	−42	4
4	Sweden	3	0	3	146	210	−64	3

Source: FIBA

7 July

Boxscore

Italy	58–34	Slovakia

7 July

Boxscore

Sweden	36–74	France

8 July

Boxscore

Slovakia	70–65	Sweden

8 July

Boxscore

France	69–76	Italy

9 July

Boxscore

Sweden	45–66	Italy

9 July

Boxscore

France	65–42	Slovakia

=== Group C ===
Pos	Team	Pld	W	L	PF	PA	PD	Pts
1	Hungary	3	3	0	208	138	+70	6
2	Latvia	3	2	1	192	188	+4	5
3	Poland	3	1	2	185	210	−25	4
4	Croatia	3	0	3	195	244	−49	3

Source: FIBA

7 July

Boxscore

Poland	62–70	Latvia

7 July

Boxscore

Hungary	86–51	Croatia

8 July

Boxscore

Croatia	84–87	Poland

8 July

Boxscore

Latvia	51–66	Hungary

9 July

Boxscore

Latvia	71–60	Croatia

9 July

Boxscore

Hungary	56–36	Poland

=== Group D ===
Pos	Team	Pld	W	L	PF	PA	PD	Pts
1	Spain	3	3	0	213	134	+79	6
2	Portugal	3	2	1	181	173	+8	5
3	Netherlands	3	1	2	199	203	−4	4
4	Belgium	3	0	3	150	233	−83	3

Source: FIBA

7 July

Boxscore

Portugal	43–57	Spain

7 July

Boxscore

Belgium	59–83	Netherlands

8 July

Boxscore

Spain	77–32	Belgium

8 July

Boxscore

Netherlands	57–65	Portugal

9 July

Boxscore

Belgium	59–73	Portugal

9 July

Boxscore

Spain	79–59	Netherlands

== Knockout stage ==
=== Championship bracket ===
Round of 16
11 July
Russia	79
Sweden	84
11 July
Latvia	73
Netherlands	77
11 July
France	68
Germany	66
11 July
Spain	93
Croatia	41
11 July
Serbia	100
Slovakia	61
11 July
Hungary	66
Belgium	48
11 July
Italy	73
Slovenia	64
11 July
Portugal	61
Poland	46

Quarter-finals
12 July
Sweden	66
Netherlands	74
12 July
France	50
Spain	51
12 July
Serbia	73
Hungary	61
12 July
Italy	70
Portugal	42

Semi-finals
14 July
Netherlands	52
Spain	64
14 July
Serbia	64
Italy	58

Final
15 July
Spain	69
Serbia	50
Third place
15 July
Netherlands	65
Italy	60

=== 5th–8th place bracket ===
5th–8th place semifinals
14 July
Sweden	60
France	93
14 July
Hungary	72
Portugal	55

5th place game
16 July
France	58
Hungary	61
7th place game
16 July
Sweden	47
Portugal	71

=== 9th–16th place bracket ===
9th–16th place quarterfinals
12 July
Russia	74
Latvia	75
12 July
Germany	79
Croatia	59
12 July
Slovakia	51
Belgium	66
12 July
Slovenia	77
Poland	81

9th–12th place semifinals
14 July
Latvia	67
Germany	70
14 July
Belgium	79
Poland	72

9th place game
16 July
Germany	75
Belgium	58
11th place game
16 July
Latvia	71
Poland	57

=== 13th–16th place bracket ===
13th–16th place semifinals
14 July
Russia	97
Croatia	51
14 July
Slovakia	57
Slovenia	84

13th place game
15 July
Russia	86
Slovenia	71
15th place game
15 July
Croatia	52
Slovakia	68

=== Final ===
12 July 2018
20:15

Boxscore

Spain	69–50	Serbia
Scoring by quarter: 17–6, 19–5, 15–12, 18–27

Novomatic Arèna Sopron, Sopron (HUN)
Attendance: 1000
Referees: Andris Aunkrogers (LAT), Michal Proc (POL), Martin Van Hoye (BEL)

== Final standings ==
Rank	Team	Record
Gold medal	Spain	7–0
Silver medal	Serbia	5–2
Bronze medal	Netherlands	4–3
4th	Italy	5–2
5th	Hungary	6–1
6th	France	4–3
7th	Portugal	4–3
8th	Sweden	1–6
9th	Germany	4–3
10th	Belgium	2–5
11th	Latvia	4–3
12th	Poland	2–5
13th	Russia	4–3
14th	Slovenia	2–5
15th	Slovakia	2–5
16th	Croatia	0–7

Relegated to the 2019 FIBA U20 Women's European Championship Division B

== Awards ==
Most Valuable Player
(Spain) Iris Junio

All-Tournament Team

- (Spain) Iris Junio (MVP)
- (Serbia) Ivana Racca
- (Serbia) Ivana Katanic
- (Netherlands) Laura Westerik
- (Germany) Satou Sabally
