= Germany women's national under-20 basketball team =

National basketball team of Germany

Germany
- FIBA zone: FIBA Europe
- National federation: German Basketball Federation

U20 EuroBasket
- Appearances: 16
- Medals: None

U20 EuroBasket Division B
- Appearances: 5
- Medals: (gold) Gold: 2 (2014, 2017); (silver) Silver: 2 (2012, 2023)

The Germany women's national under-20 basketball team is a national basketball team of Germany, administered by the German Basketball Federation. It represents the country in international under-20 women's basketball competitions.

== FIBA U20 Women's EuroBasket participations ==
Year	Division A	Division B
2000	10th	
2002	12th	
2005	9th	
2006	6th	
2007	8th	
2008	13th	
2009	8th	
2010	14th	
2011	15th	
2012		2nd place, silver medalist(s)
2013	14th	

Year	Division A	Division B
2014		1st place, gold medalist(s)
2015	13th	
2016	16th	
2017		1st place, gold medalist(s)
2018	9th	
2019	16th	
2022		6th
2023		2nd place, silver medalist(s)
2024	4th	
2025	9th	

== See also ==
- Germany women's national basketball team
- Germany women's national under-19 basketball team
- Germany men's national under-20 basketball team
