= Aleksandra Stanaćev =

Serbian basketball player

No. 10 – Durán Maquinaria Ensino Lugo
- Position: Point guard
- League: Liga Dia - Liga Femenina

Personal information
- Born: 25 September 1994 (age 32) Kikinda, Serbia, FR Yugoslavia
- Listed height: 1.67 m (5 ft 6 in)

Career information
- WNBA draft: 2016: undrafted
- Playing career: 2011–present

Career history
- 2011–2014: Crvena zvezda
- 2014–2015: CB Conquero
- 2015–2016: Cadí La Seu
- 2016–2018: CB Bembibre
- 2018-2019: Quesos El Pastor
- 2019-present: Durán Maquinaria Ensino Lugo
Medals
Women's basketball
Representing Serbia
EuroBasket
Bronze medal – third place	2019 Latvia/Serbia
European U18 Championship
Bronze medal – third place	2012 Romania

Aleksandra Stanaćev (Serbian Cyrillic: Александра Станаћев; born 25 September 1994) is a Serbian female professional basketball point guard, who plays for Durán Maquinaria Ensino Lugo in the Spanish women basketball league (Liga DIA).
