= 2016 FIBA U20 Women's European Championship =

15th FIBA Under-20 Women's European Basketball Championship

Tournament details
- Host country: Portugal
- Dates: 9–17 July 2016
- Teams: 16 (from 1 federation)
- Venues: 3 (in 1 host city)

Final positions
- Champions: Spain (6th title)

Tournament statistics
- MVP: (Italy) Cecilia Zandalasini
- Top scorer: (Italy) Zandalasini (22.0)
- Top rebounds: (Russia) Musina (12.6)
- Top assists: (Netherlands) Cornelius (5.0)
- PPG (Team): (Spain) (70.6)
- RPG (Team): (Russia) (44.3)
- APG (Team): (Spain) (14.4)

Official website
- www.fiba.basketball

The 2016 FIBA U20 Women's European Championship was the 15th edition of the Women's U-20 European basketball championship. 16 teams participated in the competition, which was played in Matosinhos, Portugal, from 9 to 17 July 2016.

Spain won their sixth gold in the competition history, beating Italy in the final 71–69.

== Venues ==
- Centro de Desportos e Congressos, Matosinhos
- Pavilhao Municipal de Guiföes, Matosinhos
- Custoias Arena, Custoias

== Participating teams ==
- Belgium
- Bosnia and Herzegovina ▲ (Winners, 2015 FIBA Europe Under-20 Championship for Women Division B)
- France
- Germany
- Greece ▲ (Runners-up, 2015 FIBA Europe Under-20 Championship for Women Division B)
- Italy
- Latvia
- Netherlands
- Poland
- Portugal
- Russia
- Serbia
- Slovakia
- Spain
- Sweden ▲ (3rd place, 2015 FIBA Europe Under-20 Championship for Women Division B)
- Turkey

== Preliminary round ==
In this round, the 16 teams are allocated in four groups of four teams each. All teams advance to the playoff round of 16.

=== Group A ===
Pos	Team	Pld	W	L	PF	PA	PD	Pts
1	Spain	3	2	1	209	149	+60	5
2	Portugal	3	2	1	232	204	+28	5
3	Poland	3	2	1	179	183	−4	5
4	Bosnia and Herzegovina	3	0	3	169	253	−84	3

Source: FIBA

9 July 2016

Spain	56–36	Poland
Scoring by quarter: 14-8, 12-10, 14-8, 16-10

9 July 2016

Bosnia and Herzegovina	67–94	Portugal
Scoring by quarter: 21-21, 10-25, 20-19, 16-29

10 July 2016

Poland	66–53	Bosnia and Herzegovina
Scoring by quarter: 25-11, 12-14, 14-12, 15-16

10 July 2016

Portugal	64–60	Spain
Scoring by quarter: 13-10, 2-19, 21-12, 28-19

12 July 2016

Spain	93–49	Bosnia and Herzegovina
Scoring by quarter: 23-15, 21-14, 27-11, 22-9

12 July 2016

Portugal	74–77	Poland
Scoring by quarter: 16-14, 21-15, 13-31, 24-17

=== Group B ===
Pos	Team	Pld	W	L	PF	PA	PD	Pts
1	Italy	3	3	0	189	151	+38	6
2	Germany	3	2	1	186	182	+4	5
3	Serbia	3	1	2	175	183	−8	4
4	Sweden	3	0	3	168	202	−34	3

Source: FIBA

9 July 2016

Germany	54–61	Italy
Scoring by quarter: 15-21, 15-11, 9-17, 15-12

9 July 2016

Serbia	73–52	Sweden
Scoring by quarter: 13-23, 20-15, 24-4, 16-10

10 July 2016

Italy	68–41	Serbia
Scoring by quarter: 19-12, 20-8, 9-10, 20-11

10 July 2016

Sweden	60–69	Germany
Scoring by quarter: 19-19, 4-18, 14-13, 23-19

12 July 2016

Serbia	61–63	Germany
Scoring by quarter: 11-25, 12-10, 20-14, 18-14

12 July 2016

Italy	60–56	Sweden
Scoring by quarter: 18-11, 15-14, 16-16, 11-15

=== Group C ===
Pos	Team	Pld	W	L	PF	PA	PD	Pts
1	France	3	3	0	187	151	+36	6
2	Greece	3	1	2	218	214	+4	4
3	Latvia	3	1	2	187	190	−3	4
4	Netherlands	3	1	2	177	214	−37	4

Source: FIBA

9 July 2016

Latvia	49–56	Netherlands
Scoring by quarter: 7-17, 14-10, 17-12, 11-17

9 July 2016

France	55–51	Greece
Scoring by quarter: 10-13, 20-15, 15-13, 10-10

10 July 2016

Netherlands	41–65	France
Scoring by quarter: 11-20, 12-16, 9-11, 9-18

10 July 2016

Greece	67–79	Latvia
Scoring by quarter: 17-15, 11-23, 16-18, 23-23

12 July 2016

France	67–59	Latvia
Scoring by quarter: 20-20, 12-18, 20-8, 15-13

12 July 2016

Netherlands	80–100	Greece
Scoring by quarter: 28-22, 16-23, 17-24, 19-31

=== Group D ===
Pos	Team	Pld	W	L	PF	PA	PD	Pts
1	Russia	3	3	0	204	165	+39	6
2	Slovakia	3	2	1	161	157	+4	5
3	Belgium	3	1	2	158	164	−6	4
4	Turkey	3	0	3	154	191	−37	3

Source: FIBA

9 July 2016

Russia	71–56	Turkey
Scoring by quarter: 22-13, 17-16, 16-19, 16-8

9 July 2016

Slovakia	51–39	Belgium
Scoring by quarter: 10-5, 10-8, 15-6, 16-20

10 July 2016

Belgium	59–67	Russia
Scoring by quarter: 10-9, 18-24, 22-19, 9-15

10 July 2016

Turkey	52–60	Slovakia
Scoring by quarter: 15-9, 9-15, 7-20, 21-16

12 July 2016

Russia	66–50	Slovakia
Scoring by quarter: 16-10, 22-13, 14-20, 14-7

12 July 2016

Belgium	60–46	Turkey
Scoring by quarter: 15-14, 14-6, 14-17, 17-9

== Final round ==
=== Bracket ===
Round of 16
13 July
Spain	79
Sweden	53
13 July
Greece	58
Belgium	62
13 July
Germany	47
Poland	63
13 July
Russia	81
Netherlands	70
13 July
Portugal	52
Serbia	63
13 July
France	66
Turkey	61
13 July
Italy	76
Bosnia and Herzegovina	69
13 July
Slovakia	42
Latvia	61

Quarterfinals
15 July
Spain	58
Belgium	50
15 July
Poland	55
Russia	68
15 July
Serbia	73
France	66
15 July
Italy	61
Latvia	54

Semifinals
16 July
Spain	77
Russia	61
16 July
Serbia	60
Italy	63

Final
17 July
Spain	71
Italy	69
Third place
17 July
Russia	78
Serbia	72

=== Classification ===
==== 5th–8th place classification ====
5th–8th place semifinals
16 July
Belgium	75
Poland	40
16 July
France	67
Latvia	59

Fifth place
17 July
Belgium	70
France	69
Seventh place
17 July
Poland	67
Latvia	72

==== 9th–16th place classification ====
9th–16th place quarterfinals
15 July
Sweden	63
Greece	58
15 July
Germany	54
Netherlands	77
15 July
Portugal	50
Turkey	48
15 July
Bosnia and Herzegovina	73
Slovakia	65

9th–12th place semifinals
16 July
Sweden	58
Netherlands	62
16 July
Portugal	67
Bosnia and Herzegovina	47

Ninth place
17 July
Netherlands	66
Portugal	61
Eleventh place
17 July
Sweden	61
Bosnia and Herzegovina	80

13th–16th place semifinals
16 July
Greece	52
Germany	47
16 July
Turkey	62
Slovakia	59

13th place
17 July
Greece	65
Turkey	67
15th place
17 July
Germany	37
Slovakia	52

== Final standings ==
Rank	Team	Record
Gold medal	Spain	6–1
Silver medal	Italy	6–1
Bronze medal	Russia	6–1
4th	Serbia	3–4
5th	Belgium	4–3
6th	France	5–2
7th	Latvia	3–4
8th	Poland	3–4
9th	Netherlands	4–3
10th	Portugal	4–3
11th	Bosnia and Herzegovina	2–5
12th	Sweden	1–6
13th	Turkey	2–5
14th	Greece	2–5
15th	Slovakia	3–4
16th	Germany	2–5

Relegated to the 2017 FIBA U20 Women's European Championship Division B

== Awards ==
Most Valuable Player
(Italy) Cecilia Zandalasini

=== All-Tournament Team ===
- (Serbia) Aleksandra Crvendakić
- (Russia) Raisa Musina
- (Belgium) Julie Allemand
- (Spain) Laura Quevedo
- (Italy) Cecilia Zandalasini
