= Switzerland women's national under-20 basketball team =

Switzerland
- FIBA zone: FIBA Europe
- National federation: Swiss Basketball

U20 EuroBasket
- Appearances: None

U20 EuroBasket Division B
- Appearances: 7
- Medals: None

The Switzerland women's national under-20 basketball team is a national basketball team of Switzerland, administered by the Swiss Basketball. It represents the country in international under-20 women's basketball competitions.

== FIBA U20 Women's EuroBasket participations ==
Year	Result in Division B
2006	10th
2007	9th
2012	8th
2022	9th
2023	4th
2024	11th
2025	9th

== See also ==
- Switzerland women's national basketball team
- Switzerland women's national under-18 basketball team
- Switzerland men's national under-20 basketball team
