= Belgium women's national under-20 basketball team =

National basketball team of Belgium

Belgium
- FIBA zone: FIBA Europe
- National federation: Basketball Belgium

U21 World Championship
- Appearances: 1
- Medals: None

U20 EuroBasket
- Appearances: 14
- Medals: None

U20 EuroBasket Division B
- Appearances: 6
- Medals: (gold) Gold: 1 (2013); (silver) Silver: 1 (2024); (bronze) Bronze: 1 (2009)

The Belgium women's national under-20 basketball team is a national basketball team of Belgium, administered by the Basketball Belgium. It represents the country in international under-20 women's basketball competitions.

== FIBA U20 Women's EuroBasket participations ==
| Year | Division A | Division B |
|---|---|---|
| 2004 | 10th | |
| 2005 | 14th | |
| 2006 | 5th | |
| 2007 | 5th | |
| 2008 | 15th | |
| 2009 | | 3rd place, bronze medalist(s) |
| 2010 | | 7th |
| 2011 | | 7th |
| 2012 | | 7th |
| 2013 | | 1st place, gold medalist(s) |

| Year | Division A | Division B |
|---|---|---|
| 2014 | 13th | |
| 2015 | 11th | |
| 2016 | 5th | |
| 2017 | 7th | |
| 2018 | 10th | |
| 2019 | 4th | |
| 2022 | 13th | |
| 2023 | 15th | |
| 2024 | | 2nd place, silver medalist(s) |
| 2025 | 5th | |

== FIBA Under-21 World Championship for Women participations ==
| Year | Result |
|---|---|
| 2007 | 5th |

== See also ==
- Belgium women's national basketball team
- Belgium women's national under-19 basketball team
- Belgium men's national under-20 basketball team
