= 2004 FIBA Africa Under-20 Championship squads =

This article displays the rosters for the participating teams at the 2004 FIBA Africa Championship.

== Angola ==
Angola men's national U20 basketball team - 2004 FIBA Africa Championship - Bronze Medal roster
Players
Coaches

Pos.	No.	Name	Age – Date of birth	Height	Club	Ctr.
		Manuel Mariano	17 – 7 July 1987		Petro Atlético	(Angola)
		Francisco Luano	16 – 3 July 1988		1º de Agosto	(Angola)
	6	Carlos Morais	18 – 16 October 1985		Petro Atlético	(Angola)
		Romualdo António	–		Sporting Cabinda	(Angola)
	8	Michel Santos	18 – 15 April 1986		G.D. Nocal	(Angola)
		Luís Mário	–		PROMADE	(Angola)
	10	Samu Maria	20 – 2 April 1984		G.D. Nocal	(Angola)
	11	Paulo Muquixe	18 – 20 October 1985		1º de Agosto	(Angola)
	12	Domingos Bonifácio	19 – 28 October 1984		Interclube	(Angola)
		José Garcia	–			(United States)
	14	Mílton Barros	20 – 21 June 1984		Petro Atlético	(Angola)
	15	Hermenegildo Mbunga	18 – 4 September 1985		Petro Atlético	(Angola)

Head coach

- (Angola) José Carlos Guimarães

Assistant coach

Legend

- (C) Team captain
- nat field describes country

== Mauritania ==
Mauritania men's national U20 basketball team – 2004 FIBA Africa Championship – 8th place roster
Players
Coaches

Pos.	No.	Name	Age – Date of birth	Height	Club	Ctr.
	4	Aljouma Sidibe	17 – 23 March 1987
	5	Abdoul Gaye	16 – 1 January 1988
	6	Mamoudou Ba	16 – 1 January 1988
	7	Moussa Djigo	15 – 15 August 1988
	8	Bassirou Tambou	17 – 13 January 1987
	9	Boussire Kane	16 – 1 January 1988
	10	Ibrahima Mamadou Fall	15 – 10 May 1989
	11	Harouna Niang	17 – 1 January 1987
	12	Yacoub Fall	17 – 1 January 1987
	13	Mamadou Thiam	14 – 13 November 1989
	14	Mamadou Kane	18 – 1 January 1986
	15	Mohamed Diakite	15 – 3 October 1988

Head coach

Assistant coach

Legend

- (C) Team captain
- Club field describes current club

== Tunisia ==
Tunisia men's national U20 basketball team – 2004 FIBA Africa Championship – 5th place roster
Players
Coaches

Pos.	No.	Name	Age – Date of birth	Height	Club	Ctr.
	4	Yassine Sassi	20 – 22 January 1984
	5	Mohamed Foudhaïli	18 – 4 February 1986
	6	Oussama Ferjani	20 – 14 May 1984
	7	Mourad El Mabrouk	17 – 19 October 1986	1.89 m (6 ft 2 in)
	8	Marouan Laghnej	18 – 22 April 1986	1.92 m (6 ft 4 in)
C	9	Mohamed Hadidane	18 – 27 April 1986	2.06 m (6 ft 9 in)
C	10	Bechir Hdidane	20 – 18 August 1984	2.01 m (6 ft 7 in)
	11	Mohamed Maghrebi	20 – 31 July 1984
	12	Mohamed Mouine	18 – 1 January 1986
	13	Slim Blidi	17 – 1 July 1987
	14	Hamdi Chargui	19 – 8 January 1985
	15	Omar Mouhli	18 – 19 March 1986	1.90 m (6 ft 3 in)

Head coach

Assistant coach

Legend

- (C) Team captain
- Club field describes current club
