= 2012–13 FC Barcelona Bàsquet season =

Spanish basketball club season

FC Barcelona Regal
2012–13 season
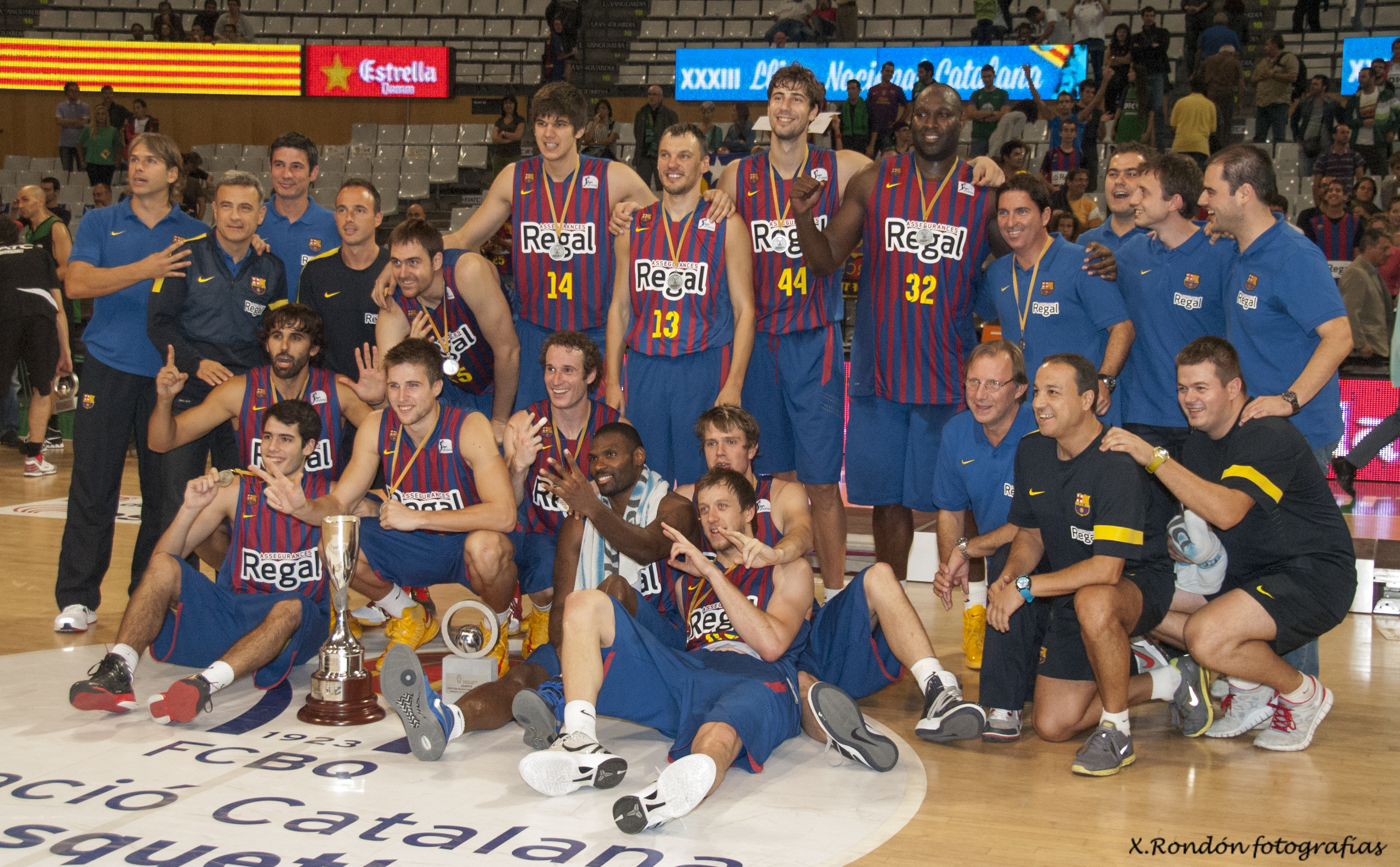
- FC Barcelona roster in September 2012
- Chairman: Sandro Rosell
- Head coach: Xavier Pascual
- Arena: Palau Blaugrana
- Euroleague: Fourth place
- ACB: Runners-up
- Copa del Rey: Winners
- Supercopa: Runners-up
- Highest home attendance: 7,585 vs Panathinaikos (25 April 2013)
- Average home attendance: 4,561 (in Liga ACB)
- Biggest win: 98–50 vs Lagun Aro GBC (6 January 2013)
- Biggest defeat: 88–66 vs Asefa Estudiantes (13 January 2013)
Home	Away	Third

The 2012–13 season of FC Barcelona Bàsquet was the 48th season of the club in the highest division of Spanish basketball and the 30th season in the Liga ACB.

In the 2012–13 season, FC Barcelona competed in the Liga ACB, the Supercopa, the Copa del Rey and the EuroLeague.

== Players ==
=== Roster ===
Note: Flags indicate national team eligibility at FIBA-sanctioned events. Players may hold other non-FIBA nationalities not displayed.

FC Barcelona Regal roster
Players
Coaches

Pos.	No.	Nat.	Name	Ht.	Wt.	Age
PG	8	(Spain)	Sada, Víctor	1.92 m (6 ft 4 in)	93 kg (205 lb)	29 – 8 March 1984
PG	9	(Brazil)	Huertas, Marcelinho	1.91 m (6 ft 3 in)	84 kg (185 lb)	30 – 25 May 1983
SG	10	(Spain)	Abrines, Álex (Y)	1.98 m (6 ft 6 in)	86 kg (190 lb)	19 – 1 August 1993
SG	11	(Spain)	Navarro, Juan Carlos (C)	1.92 m (6 ft 4 in)	90.5 kg (200 lb)	33 – 13 June 1980
PG	13	(Lithuania)	Jasikevičius, Šarūnas	1.94 m (6 ft 4 in)	92 kg (203 lb)	37 – 5 March 1976
PF/C	14	(Montenegro)	Todorović, Marko	2.08 m (6 ft 10 in)	113 kg (249 lb)	21 – 19 April 1992
PF/C	18	(United States)	Wallace, Judson	2.06 m (6 ft 9 in)	109 kg (240 lb)	30 – 31 December 1982
SF	19	(Sweden)	Eriksson, Marcus (Y)	2.00 m (6 ft 7 in)	89 kg (196 lb)	19 – 5 December 1993
G/F	20	(Australia)	Ingles, Joe	2.03 m (6 ft 8 in)	100 kg (220 lb)	25 – 2 October 1987
F/C	21	(Greece)	Mavrokefalidis, Loukas	2.10 m (6 ft 11 in)	120 kg (265 lb)	28 – 25 July 1984
G/F	22	(Spain)	Rabaseda, Xavi	1.98 m (6 ft 6 in)	93 kg (205 lb)	24 – 24 February 1989
G/F	23	(Croatia)	Hezonja, Mario (Y)	2.02 m (6 ft 8 in)	91 kg (201 lb)	18 – 25 February 1995
SG	24	(Spain)	Oleson, Brad	1.91 m (6 ft 3 in)	90.5 kg (200 lb)	30 – 11 April 1983
PF/C	25	(Slovenia)	Lorbek, Erazem	2.08 m (6 ft 10 in)	113 kg (249 lb)	29 – 21 February 1984
PF/C	32	(Australia)	Jawai, Nathan	2.09 m (6 ft 10 in)	130 kg (287 lb)	26 – 10 October 1986
SF	33	(United States)	Mickeal, Pete	2.01 m (6 ft 7 in)	109 kg (240 lb)	35 – 22 February 1978
C	44	(Croatia)	Tomić, Ante	2.18 m (7 ft 2 in)	120 kg (265 lb)	26 – 17 February 1987

Head coach

- (Spain) Xavier Pascual

Assistant coach(es)

- (Spain) Agustín Julbé
- (Spain) Iñigo Zorzano
- (Spain) David García

Legend

- (C) Team captain
- Injured

- Roster

=== Depth chart ===
Pos.	Starting 5	Bench 1	Bench 2	Bench 3
C	Ante Tomić	Nathan Jawai *	Loukas Mavrokefalidis
PF	Erazem Lorbek	C. J. Wallace	Marko Todorović †
SF	Pete Mickeal *	Joe Ingles	Marcus Eriksson ‡	Mario Hezonja ‡
SG	Juan Carlos Navarro †	Brad Oleson †	Xavi Rabaseda †	Álex Abrines ‡
PG	Marcelinho Huertas	Šarūnas Jasikevičius	Víctor Sada †

Notes: Blue † – homegrown player; Red * – overseas player; Green ‡ – youth player

=== In ===
No.	Pos.	Nat.	Name	Age	Moving from		Type	Ends	Transfer fee	Date	Source
44	C	(Croatia)	Ante Tomić	25	Real Madrid	(Spain)	Parted ways	2015	–	5 July 2012	
32	C	(Australia)	Nathan Jawai	25	UNICS Kazan	(Russia)	Free agency	2013	–	18 July 2012	
13	PG	(Lithuania)	Šarūnas Jasikevičius	36	Panathinaikos	(Greece)	Free agency	2013	–	25 July 2012	
10	G/F	(Spain)	Álex Abrines	19	Unicaja	(Spain)	Free agency	2016	–	25 July 2012	
14	PF/C	(Montenegro)	Marko Todorović	20	FIATC Joventut	(Spain)	Transfer	2014	€300,000	7 August 2012	
24	G	(Spain)	Brad Oleson	29	Caja Laboral	(Spain)	Parted ways	2015	–	28 January 2013	
21	C	(Greece)	Loukas Mavrokefalidis	29	Spartak Saint Peterburg	(Russia)	Parted ways	2013	–	16 May 2013	

=== Out ===
No.	Pos.	Nat.	Name	Age	Moving to		Type	Transfer fee	Date	Source
13	C	(Serbia)	Kosta Perović	27	Unicaja	(Spain)	End of contract	–	31 June 2012	
17	C	(Spain)	Fran Vázquez	29	Unicaja	(Spain)	End of contract	–	31 June 2012	
21	C	(Senegal)	Boniface N'Dong	34	Galatasaray	(Turkey)	End of contract	–	31 June 2012	
31	G/F	(United States)	Chuck Eidson	32	UNICS Kazan	(Russia)	Parted ways	–	18 August 2012	

== Pre-season and friendlies ==
=== Friendly matches ===
1 September 2012	FC Barcelona Regal	71–75	Valencia Basket	Lleida
20:45	Scoring by quarter: 21–27, 13–14, 23–14, 14–20
	Pts: Ingles 17	Report		Arena: Pavelló Barris Nord

7 September 2012 Torneig iCroms	FC Barcelona Regal	66–68	Valencia Basket	Sabadell
19:00
		Report		Arena: Pavelló Nord

13 September 2012 Sofia International Tournament	Lukoil Academic	69–71	FC Barcelona Regal	Sofia
	Pts: Stoykov 15	Report	Pts: Jawai 21	Arena: Universiada Hall

15 September 2012 Sofia International Tournament	FC Barcelona Regal	85–80	Panathinaikos	Sofia
20:00	Scoring by quarter: 20–19, 20–17, 25–16, 20–28
	Pts: Ingles 18	Report	Pts: three players 15	Arena: Universiada Hall

9 October 2012	Dallas Mavericks	85–99	FC Barcelona Regal	Barcelona
21:00	Scoring by quarter: 19–21, 21–21, 16–32, 29–25
	Pts: Kaman 15; Rebs: Kaman 10; Asts: Collison 4	Report	Pts: Mickeal, Navarro 19; Rebs: Wallace 13; Asts: Wallace 5	Arena: Palau Sant Jordi; Attendance: 16,236; Referees: Juan Carlos González, Zach Zarba, Sean Wright

=== Lliga Catalana de Bàsquet ===
25 September 2012 Semifinal	FC Barcelona Regal	80–60	Força Lleida	Badalona
19:00	Scoring by quarter: 17–17, 21–7, 23–20, 19–16
	Pts: three players 14; Rebs: Todorović, Tomić 7 Asts: Jasikevičius, Sada 3 PIR: Jawai 18	Boxscore	Pts: Thompson 12; Rebs: Calegari 5 Asts: Rodríguez, Thompson 2 PIR: Thompson 12	Arena: Olímpic de Badalona; Referees: Perea, Guirao, De Oyón

26 September 2012 Final	FIATC Joventut	69–76	FC Barcelona Regal	Badalona
21:00	Scoring by quarter: 17–18, 12–21, 20–16, 20–21
	Pts: Quezada 19; Rebs: Gaffney 10; Asts: Quezada, Savané 2 PIR: Gaffney 24	Boxscore	Pts: Lorbek 15; Rebs: Mickeal 8 Asts: Huertas, Jasikevičius 2 PIR: Lorbek 18	Arena: Olímpic de Badalona; Attendance: 4,000; Referees: Xavier Amorós, Lluís Guirao, Anna Cardús

== Competitions ==
=== Overview ===
Competition	First match	Last match	Starting round	Final position	Record							
Competition	First match	Last match	Starting round	Final position	Pld	W	D	L	PF	PA	PD	Win %
Liga ACB	30 September 2012	19 June 2013	Round 1	Runners-up	45	30		15	3,539	3,228	+311	66.67
EuroLeague	12 October 2012	12 May 2013	Round 1	Fourth place	31	25		6	2,402	2,098	+304	80.65
Copa del Rey	7 February 2013	10 February 2013	Quarterfinals	Winners	3	3		0	276	246	+30	100.00
Supercopa	22 September 2012	23 September 2012	Semifinals	Runners-up	2	1		1	161	158	+3	50.00
Total					81	59	0	22	6,378	5,730	+648	72.84

Last updated: 2 December 2025
Source: Competitions

=== Liga ACB ===
==== League table ====
#	Teams	P	W	L	PF	PA	Qualification or relegation
1	Real Madrid	34	30	4	2985	2563	Qualified for the Playoffs
2	Laboral Kutxa	34	25	9	2815	2695	Qualified for the Playoffs
3	FC Barcelona Regal	34	23	11	2693	2436	Qualified for the Playoffs
4	Valencia Basket	34	22	12	2764	2579	Qualified for the Playoffs
5	CAI Zaragoza	34	21	13	2692	2460	Qualified for the Playoffs

Source: ACB

==== Results summary ====
Overall						Home					Away				
Pld	W	L	PF	PA	PD	W	L	PF	PA	PD	W	L	PF	PA	PD
34	23	11	2693	2436	+257	13	4	1367	1147	+220	10	7	1326	1289	+37

Source: Competitive matches

==== Results by round ====
Round	1	2	3	4	5	6	7	8	9	10	11	12	13	14	15	16	17	18	19	20	21	22	23	24	25	26	27	28	29	30	31	32	33	34
Ground	H	A	H	A	H	A	H	A	A	H	A	A	H	A	H	H	A	A	H	A	H	A	H	A	H	A	H	A	H	H	A	H	A	H
Result	L	L	W	W	W	L	W	W	L	W	W	L	L	L	W	W	L	W	W	W	W	W	L	W	W	W	W	W	L	W	L	W	W	W
Position	12	13	11	8	7	10	7	5	7	6	6	7	7	8	7	7	7	6	6	4	3	3	3	3	3	3	3	3	3	3	3	3	3	3

Source: Competitive matches
A = Away; H = Home; W = Win; L = Loss; R = Rest

==== Matches ====
30 September 2012 1	FC Barcelona Regal	71–78	Blancos de Rueda Valladolid	Barcelona
12:30	Scoring by quarter: 23–14, 19–16, 9–22, 20–26
	Pts: Ingles 18; Rebs: Tomić 10; Asts: Huertas, Ingles 3 PIR: Ingles, Tomić 20	Boxscore	Pts: Sinanović 28; Rebs: Sinanović 10; Asts: Renfroe 5 PIR: Sinanović 31	Arena: Palau Blaugrana; Attendance: 3,715; Referees: Óscar Perea, Carlos Sánchez Monserrat, David Soto

7 October 2012 2	Uxue Bilbao Basket	78–77	FC Barcelona Regal	Bilbao
18:00	Scoring by quarter: 22–27, 15–16, 20–9, 21–25
	Pts: Zisis 16; Rebs: three players 5 Asts: López 5 PIR: Mumbrú 22	Boxscore	Pts: Tomić 16; Rebs: Jawai 8 Asts: Huertas 4 PIR: Lorbek 16	Arena: Bilbao Arena; Attendance: 9,649; Referees: Daniel Hierrezuelo, Francisco Araña, Fernando Calatrava

14 October 2012 3	FC Barcelona Regal	87–68	UCAM Murcia CB	Barcelona
19:00	Scoring by quarter: 22–17, 20–8, 23–21, 22–22
	Pts: Huertas, Tomić 14; Rebs: Jawai, Tomić 6 Asts: Huertas 7 PIR: Huertas 24	Boxscore	Pts: Tillie 14; Rebs: Antelo 9 Asts: Miso 5 PIR: Gatens, Tillie 11	Arena: Palau Blaugrana; Attendance: 3,829; Referees: Vicente Bultó, Lluís Guirao, Andrés Fernández Sánchez

21 October 2012 4	CAI Zaragoza	50–65	FC Barcelona Regal	Zaragoza
18:00	Scoring by quarter: 15–21, 12–16, 10–16, 13–12
	Pts: Rudež 14; Rebs: Norel 6 Asts: Rudez, van Rossom 2 PIR: Rudez 10	Boxscore	Pts: Mickeal 11; Rebs: Jawai 10; Asts: Ingles 3 PIR: Mickeal 19	Arena: Príncipe Felipe; Attendance: 7,800; Referees: José Antonio Martín Bertrán, Benjamín Jiménez, Jacobo Rial

28 October 2012 5	FC Barcelona Regal	100–75	CB Canarias	Barcelona
12:15	Scoring by quarter: 23–24, 25–18, 31–20, 21–13
	Pts: Navarro 21; Rebs: Tomić 7 Asts: Navarro 8 PIR: Navarro 28	Boxscore	Pts: Rost 18; Rebs: Donaldson 12; Asts: Richotti, Úriz 4 PIR: Rost 21	Arena: Palau Blaugrana; Attendance: 4,192; Referees: Emilio Pérez Pizarro, Luis Miguel Castillo, Anna Cardús

4 November 2012 6	Caja Laboral	80–69	FC Barcelona Regal	Vitoria-Gasteiz
19:00	Scoring by quarter: 17–20, 27–15, 16–19, 20–15
	Pts: Lampe, San Emeterio 15; Rebs: Bjelica, Cabezas 6 Asts: Cabezas, Rochestie 3 PIR: Cabezas 20	Boxscore	Pts: Lorbek 17; Rebs: Lorbek, Tomić 4 Asts: Huertas 5 PIR: Navarro 15	Arena: Buesa Arena; Attendance: 13,184; Referees: Juan Carlos Arteaga, Vicente Bultó, David Planells

11 November 2012 7	FC Barcelona Regal	89–47	Assignia Manresa	Barcelona
12:30	Scoring by quarter: 27–9, 27–9, 15–13, 20–16
	Pts: Tomić 16; Rebs: Tomić 6 Asts: Huertas, Tomić 4 PIR: Tomić 23	Boxscore	Pts: Arco 15; Rebs: Hanga, Ramsdell 5 Asts: Hernández 3 PIR: Arco, Hanga 15	Arena: Palau Blaugrana; Attendance: 4,535; Referees: Miguel Ángel Pérez Pérez, Fernando Calatrava, Pedro Munar

18 November 2012 8	Mad-Croc Fuenlabrada	76–79(OT)	FC Barcelona Regal	Fuenlabrada
12:30	Scoring by quarter: 14–15, 19–15, 27–23, 14–21, Overtime: 2–5
	Pts: García 23; Rebs: Sene 12; Asts: Colom 4 PIR: García 23	Boxscore	Pts: three players 16; Rebs: Mickeal, Tomić 6 Asts: Navarro 6 PIR: Navarro 20	Arena: Fernando Martín; Attendance: 5,236; Referees: Antonio Conde, Benjamín Jiménez, Rubén Sánchez Mohedas

25 November 2012 9	Valencia Basket	81–78	FC Barcelona Regal	Valencia
18:00	Scoring by quarter: 13–23, 28–20, 25–17, 15–18
	Pts: Dubljević 19; Rebs: Piétrus 7 Asts: San Miguel 6 PIR: Quinn 16	Boxscore	Pts: Huertas 21; Rebs: Tomić 7 Asts: Huertas 6 PIR: Huertas 33	Arena: La Fonteta; Attendance: 8,800; Referees: José Antonio Martín Bertrán, Francisco Araña, Miguel Ángel Pérez Niz

2 December 2012 10	FC Barcelona Regal	78–64	Cajasol	Barcelona
19:00	Scoring by quarter: 15–15, 14–17, 26–13, 23–19
	Pts: Ingles, Tomić 13; Rebs: Tomić 8 Asts: Huertas 4 PIR: three players 14	Boxscore	Pts: Bogdanović 19; Rebs: Dozier, Triguero 4 Asts: Tepić 5 PIR: Bogdanović 19	Arena: Palau Blaugrana; Attendance: 4,469; Referees: Juan Carlos García González, Carlos Peruga, Anna Cardús

9 December 2012 11	FIATC Joventut	63–78	FC Barcelona Regal	Badalona
12:15	Scoring by quarter: 13–26, 25–16, 2–14, 23–22
	Pts: Fisher 15; Rebs: Gaffney 10; Asts: three players 1 PIR: Tomàs 13	Boxscore	Pts: Navarro 12; Rebs: Jawai, Wallace 7 Asts: Navarro 5 PIR: Navarro 17	Arena: Olímpic de Badalona; Attendance: 8,275; Referees: Emilio Pérez Pizarro, Lluís Guirao, Sergio Manuel

16 December 2012 12	Gran Canaria 2014	81–69	FC Barcelona Regal	Las Palmas
12:30	Scoring by quarter: 23–19, 13–21, 26–15, 19–14
	Pts: Nelson 20; Rebs: Nelson 10; Asts: Bellas, Nelson 4 PIR: Nelson 28	Boxscore	Pts: Navarro, Tomić 15; Rebs: Tomić 12; Asts: Tomić 3 PIR: Tomić 22	Arena: Centro Insular de Deportes; Attendance: 5,027; Referees: Juan Luis Redondo, Óscar Perea, David Soto

19 December 2012 13	FC Barcelona Regal	54–62	Blu:sens Monbus	Barcelona
20:45	Scoring by quarter: 13–15, 10–12, 14–18, 17–17
	Pts: Tomić 14; Rebs: Tomić 8 Asts: Huertas 5 PIR: Tomić 22	Boxscore	Pts: Mejri 11; Rebs: Mejri 8 Asts: Rodríguez 9 PIR: Rodríguez 18	Arena: Palau Blaugrana; Attendance: 3,651; Referees: Vicente Bultó, Carlos Sánchez Monserrat, Miguel Ángel Pérez Niz

23 December 2012 14	Unicaja	71–69	FC Barcelona Regal	Málaga
12:40	Scoring by quarter: 18–17, 13–20, 22–15, 18–17
	Pts: Williams 15; Rebs: Panko 8 Asts: Williams 4 PIR: Vázquez, Williams 13	Boxscore	Pts: Tomić 22; Rebs: Mickeal 13; Asts: four players 2 PIR: Tomić 25	Arena: Martín Carpena; Attendance: 7,100; Referees: Antonio Conde, Juan José Martínez Díez, Jorge Martínez

30 December 2012 15	FC Barcelona Regal	96–89	Real Madrid	Barcelona
19:00	Scoring by quarter: 23–20, 22–24, 28–20, 23–25
	Pts: Navarro 33; Rebs: Tomić 7 Asts: Jasikevičius 4 PIR: Navarro 44	Boxscore	Pts: Fernández 18; Rebs: Fernández, Reyes 5 Asts: Rodríguez 5 PIR: Fernández 26	Arena: Palau Blaugrana; Attendance: 7,359; Referees: Juan Carlos Arteaga, Francisco Araña, Fernando Calatrava

6 January 2013 16	FC Barcelona Regal	98–50	Lagun Aro GBC	Barcelona
12:00	Scoring by quarter: 30–13, 20–15, 27–10, 21–12
	Pts: Sada 13; Rebs: Jawai 10; Asts: Huertas 4 PIR: Sada 20	Boxscore	Pts: Neto 14; Rebs: Doblas 5 Asts: Salgado 4 PIR: Neto 13	Arena: Palau Blaugrana; Attendance: 2,398; Referees: José Ramón García Ortiz, Benjamín Jiménez, Juan de Dios Oyón

13 January 2013 17	Asefa Estudiantes	88–66	FC Barcelona Regal	Madrid
12:40	Scoring by quarter: 20–14, 22–12, 30–17, 16–23
	Pts: English 17; Rebs: Barnes, English 6 Asts: Granger 4 PIR: English 21	Boxscore	Pts: Wallace 15; Rebs: Sada 6 Asts: Jasikevičius 4 PIR: Wallace 17	Arena: WiZink Center; Attendance: 11,920; Referees: Emilio Pérez Pizarro, Carlos Cortés, Miguel Ángel Pérez Niz

20 January 2013 18	Blancos de Rueda Valladolid	82–88	FC Barcelona Regal	Valladolid
12:00	Scoring by quarter: 22–21, 23–20, 21–20, 16–27
	Pts: Montañez 16; Rebs: Renfroe 7 Asts: Martín 4 PIR: Grimau 19	Boxscore	Pts: Mickeal 20; Rebs: four players 4 Asts: Huertas 8 PIR: Huertas 28	Arena: Polideportivo Pisuerga; Attendance: 5,100; Referees: Vicente Bultó, Francisco Araña, Pedro Munar

27 January 2013 19	FC Barcelona Regal	87–85(OT)	Uxue Bilbao Basket	Barcelona
12:00	Scoring by quarter: 15–20, 14–12, 18–21, 26–20, Overtime: 14–12
	Pts: Huertas 19; Rebs: Jawai 14; Asts: Jasikevičius 6 PIR: Jasikevičius 23	Boxscore	Pts: Vasileiadis 24; Rebs: Mumbrú 9 Asts: Mumbrú 5 PIR: Hamilton 29	Arena: Palau Blaugrana; Attendance: 4,956; Referees: José Antonio Martín Bertrán, Juan José Martínez Díez, Antonio Sacristán

3 February 2013 20	Assignia Manresa	76–88	FC Barcelona Regal	Manresa
12:00	Scoring by quarter: 11–23, 25–27, 19–18, 21–20
	Pts: Hanga 17; Rebs: Arteaga 6 Asts: Rodríguez 8 PIR: Hanga 20	Boxscore	Pts: Tomić 24; Rebs: Tomić 8 Asts: Huertas 8 PIR: Tomić 30	Arena: Nou Congost; Attendance: 5,000; Referees: Juan Carlos Arteaga, Lluís Guirao, Anna Cardús

17 February 2013 21	FC Barcelona Regal	72–70	Mad-Croc Fuenlabrada	Barcelona
19:00	Scoring by quarter: 15–28, 18–9, 20–11, 19–22
	Pts: Tomić 18; Rebs: Tomić 8 Asts: Mickeal 6 PIR: Tomić 24	Boxscore	Pts: Kurz 15; Rebs: Mainoldi 6 Asts: Feldeine 7 PIR: Kurz 20	Arena: Palau Blaugrana; Attendance: 5,314; Referees: Juan Luis Redondo, Carlos Cortés, Jorge Martínez

24 February 2013 22	UCAM Murcia CB	62–79	FC Barcelona Regal	Murcia
12:40	Scoring by quarter: 20–21, 12–21, 13–18, 17–19
	Pts: Antelo 15; Rebs: Antelo 7 Asts: Rodríguez 5 PIR: Antelo 19	Boxscore	Pts: Tomić 19; Rebs: Tomić 12; Asts: Oleson, Sada 4 PIR: Tomić 25	Arena: Palacio de Deportes; Attendance: 7,068; Referees: José Ramón García Ortiz, Francisco Araña, David Soto

3 March 2013 23	FC Barcelona Regal	67–69	Caja Laboral	Barcelona
12:00	Scoring by quarter: 14–14, 13–14, 15–24, 25–17
	Pts: Mickeal 13; Rebs: Tomić 12; Asts: Sada 5 PIR: Tomić 14	Boxscore	Pts: Causeur 19; Rebs: Bjelica 13; Asts: Heurtel 6 PIR: Bjelica 24	Arena: Palau Blaugrana; Attendance: 4,921; Referees: Antonio Conde, Benjamín Jiménez, Luis Miguel Castillo

10 March 2013 24	CB Canarias	81–89	FC Barcelona Regal	San Cristóbal de La Laguna
12:40	Scoring by quarter: 23–25, 21–18, 16–22, 21–24
	Pts: Blanco, Sekulić 21; Rebs: Lampropoulos, Sekulić 6 Asts: Úriz 4 PIR: Blanco 23	Boxscore	Pts: Huertas 22; Rebs: Oleson 5 Asts: Huertas 5 PIR: Huertas 28	Arena: Santiago Martín; Attendance: 4,987; Referees: Daniel Hierrezuelo, Fernando Calatrava, Rubén Sánchez Mohedas

17 March 2013 25	FC Barcelona Regal	89–81	CAI Zaragoza	Barcelona
12:00	Scoring by quarter: 23–23, 22–19, 27–22, 17–17
	Pts: Navarro 28; Rebs: Tomić 7 Asts: Huertas 6 PIR: Tomić 28	Boxscore	Pts: Norel 25; Rebs: Aguilar 7 Asts: van Rossom 7 PIR: Norel 28	Arena: Palau Blaugrana; Attendance: 5,802; Referees: Miguel Ángel Pérez Pérez, Vicente Bultó, Sergio Manuel

23 March 2013 26	Cajasol	72–91	FC Barcelona Regal	Seville
19:00	Scoring by quarter: 19–25, 22–19, 14–24, 17–23
	Pts: Satoranský 14; Rebs: Holland, Triguero 3 Asts: Satoranský 5 PIR: Satoranský 22	Boxscore	Pts: Oleson 16; Rebs: Jawai 9 Asts: Huertas 5 PIR: Jawai 21	Arena: Deportes San Pablo; Attendance: 6,300; Referees: Emilio Pérez Pizarro, Carlos Peruga, Jorge Martínez

1 April 2013 27	FC Barcelona Regal	94–62	Valencia Basket	Barcelona
20:15	Scoring by quarter: 25–21, 19–17, 29–14, 21–10
	Pts: Tomić 17; Rebs: Jawai 7 Asts: Navarro, Sada 5 PIR: Tomić 23	Boxscore	Pts: Ribas 15; Rebs: Dubljević 12; Asts: Kelati 4 PIR: Dubljević 15	Arena: Palau Blaugrana; Attendance: 4,216; Referees: Juan Carlos Arteaga, Carlos Cortés, Juan de Dios Oyón

7 April 2013 28	Blu:sens Monbus	81–86(OT)	FC Barcelona Regal	Santiago de Compostela
12:40	Scoring by quarter: 14–14, 15–19, 18–14, 22–22, Overtime: 12–17
	Pts: Corbacho, Kendall 20; Rebs: Kendall 9 Asts: Rodríguez 9 PIR: Kendall 20	Boxscore	Pts: Tomić 16; Rebs: Tomić 8 Asts: Sada 5 PIR: Tomić 23	Arena: Fontes do Sar; Attendance: 5,802; Referees: Antonio Conde, Óscar Perea, Antonio Sacristán

14 April 2013 29	FC Barcelona Regal	70–73	Gran Canaria 2014	Barcelona
12:00	Scoring by quarter: 18–16, 16–13, 25–21, 11–23
	Pts: Oleson 15; Rebs: Tomić, Wallace 5 Asts: Huertas 5 PIR: Huertas 17	Boxscore	Pts: Newley 18; Rebs: Báez 7 Asts: four players 3 PIR: Báez 21	Arena: Palau Blaugrana; Attendance: 4,359; Referees: Benjamín Jiménez, Carlos Peruga, Jorge Martínez

21 April 2013 30	FC Barcelona Regal	78–65	Asefa Estudiantes	Barcelona
19:00	Scoring by quarter: 9–16, 17–17, 30–18, 22–14
	Pts: Huertas 15; Rebs: Wallace 7 Asts: Sada 5 PIR: Ingles 20	Boxscore	Pts: Granger 21; Rebs: Kirksay 9 Asts: Granger 3 PIR: Granger 25	Arena: Palau Blaugrana; Attendance: 5,043; Referees: José Antonio Martín Bertrán, Carlos Sánchez Monserrat, Anna Cardús

28 April 2013 31	Real Madrid	78–65	FC Barcelona Regal	Madrid
12:00	Scoring by quarter: 13–12, 20–17, 17–18, 28–18
	Pts: Reyes 19; Rebs: Mirotić 10; Asts: Rodríguez 4 PIR: Reyes 25	Boxscore	Pts: Ingles 18; Rebs: Lorbek, Tomić 7 Asts: Huertas 7 PIR: Ingles 16	Arena: WiZink Center; Attendance: 12,238; Referees: Emilio Pérez Pizarro, Lluís Guirao, Miguel Ángel Pérez Niz

5 May 2013 32	FC Barcelona Regal	80–59	FIATC Joventut	Barcelona
12:00	Scoring by quarter: 13–13, 19–17, 27–16, 21–13
	Pts: Lorbek 17; Rebs: Todorović 12; Asts: Jasikevičius 6 PIR: Oleson 20	Boxscore	Pts: Fisher 12; Rebs: Kuzmić 10; Asts: Oliver 4 PIR: Kuzmić 13	Arena: Palau Blaugrana; Attendance: 4,766; Referees: Daniel Hierrezuelo, Francisco Araña, David Planells

16 May 2013 33	Lagun Aro GBC	89–90	FC Barcelona Regal	San Sebastián
20:15	Scoring by quarter: 29–29, 24–15, 17–22, 19–24
	Pts: Neto 25; Rebs: Doblas 6 Asts: Neto 6 PIR: Neto 31	Boxscore	Pts: Oleson 26; Rebs: Sada, Tomić 7 Asts: Oleson 4 PIR: Oleson 31	Arena: Donostia Arena; Attendance: 5,820; Referees: José Ramón García Ortiz, Fernando Calatrava, Andrés Fernández Sánchez

19 May 2013 34	FC Barcelona Regal	57–50	Unicaja	Barcelona
12:30	Scoring by quarter: 19–17, 18–15, 8–12, 12–6
	Pts: Tomić 11; Rebs: Tomić 7 Asts: Sada 4 PIR: Tomić 17	Boxscore	Pts: Vázquez 10; Rebs: Vázquez 11; Asts: Urtasun 2 PIR: Vázquez 21	Arena: Palau Blaugrana; Attendance: 4,013; Referees: Juan Carlos Arteaga, Vicente Bultó, Luis Miguel Castillo

=== ACB Playoffs ===
==== Quarterfinals ====
23 May 2013 1	FC Barcelona Regal	88–62	Uxue Bilbao Basket	Barcelona
20:45	Scoring by quarter: 27–15, 22–20, 19–11, 20–16
	Pts: Mavrokefalidis 16; Rebs: Sada, Wallace 6 Asts: Tomić 6 PIR: Tomić 25	Boxscore	Pts: Hervelle 17; Rebs: Hervelle 8 Asts: Zisis 5 PIR: Grimau, Hervelle 17	Arena: Palau Blaugrana; Attendance: 4,793; Referees: Daniel Hierrezuelo, Francisco Araña, Carlos Cortés

26 May 2013 2	Uxue Bilbao Basket	90–89	FC Barcelona Regal	Bilbao
12:00	Scoring by quarter: 26–15, 22–15, 18–25, 24–34
	Pts: Hamilton 19; Rebs: Vasileiadis 6 Asts: Zisis 3 PIR: Grimau, Mumbrú 19	Boxscore	Pts: Lorbek 20; Rebs: Mavrokefalidis 7 Asts: Tomić 4 PIR: Lorbek 28	Arena: Bilbao Arena; Attendance: 6,917; Referees: Emilio Pérez Pizarro, Antonio Conde, Fernando Calatrava

28 May 2013 3	FC Barcelona Regal	79–70	Uxue Bilbao Basket	Barcelona
20:45	Scoring by quarter: 22–17, 11–18, 16–15, 30–20
	Pts: Lorbek 18; Rebs: four players 5 Asts: Huertas 6 PIR: Lorbek 24	Boxscore	Pts: Zisis 17; Rebs: Hamilton 7 Asts: three players 3 PIR: Zisis 18	Arena: Palau Blaugrana; Attendance: 4,888; Referees: Daniel Hierrezuelo, Benjamín Jiménez, Carlos Sánchez Monserrat

==== Semifinals ====
31 May 2013 1	FC Barcelona Regal	69–63	Gran Canaria 2014	Barcelona
21:00	Scoring by quarter: 16–21, 13–9, 26–15, 14–18
	Pts: Navarro 14; Rebs: Tomić 8 Asts: Tomić 4 PIR: Wallace 17	Boxscore	Pts: Nelson 21; Rebs: Báez, Nelson 11; Asts: Nelson 3 PIR: Nelson 28	Arena: Palau Blaugrana; Attendance: 5,198; Referees: Antonio Conde, José Ramón García Ortiz, Carlos Peruga

2 June 2013 2	FC Barcelona Regal	77–73	Gran Canaria 2014	Barcelona
12:40	Scoring by quarter: 23–20, 17–16, 18–21, 19–16
	Pts: Navarro 22; Rebs: Wallace 6 Asts: Navarro 5 PIR: Navarro 21	Boxscore	Pts: Toolson 20; Rebs: Báez 10; Asts: Bellas, Nelson 3 PIR: Newley 19	Arena: Palau Blaugrana; Attendance: 4,877; Referees: Juan Luis Redondo, Benjamín Jiménez, Carlos Cortés

5 June 2013 3	Gran Canaria 2014	62–84	FC Barcelona Regal	Las Palmas
21:00	Scoring by quarter: 18–17, 18–22, 12–22, 14–23
	Pts: Báez 13; Rebs: Báez 11; Asts: Bellas, Nelson 3 PIR: Báez 16	Boxscore	Pts: Oleson 17; Rebs: Wallace 7 Asts: Huertas 6 PIR: Oleson 20	Arena: Centro Insular de Deportes; Attendance: 5,023; Referees: Emilio Pérez Pizarro, Vicente Bultó, Carlos Peruga

==== Finals ====
9 June 2013 1	Real Madrid	76–72	FC Barcelona Regal	Madrid
12:40	Scoring by quarter: 21–14, 14–31, 15–13, 26–14
	Pts: Rodríguez 21; Rebs: Fernández 8 Asts: Rodríguez 4 PIR: Rodríguez 20	Boxscore	Pts: Sada 17; Rebs: Tomić 6 Asts: four players 2 PIR: Sada 16	Arena: WiZink Center; Attendance: 10,859; Referees: Emilio Pérez Pizarro, Antonio Conde, Carlos Peruga

11 June 2013 2	Real Madrid	71–72	FC Barcelona Regal	Madrid
21:00	Scoring by quarter: 10–11, 26–15, 19–20, 16–26
	Pts: Reyes 13; Rebs: Fernández 10; Asts: Rodríguez 4 PIR: Fernández 23	Boxscore	Pts: Navarro 19; Rebs: Lorbek, Tomić 5 Asts: Navarro 5 PIR: Navarro 20	Arena: WiZink Center; Attendance: 12,348; Referees: Daniel Hierrezuelo, Juan Carlos García González, Carlos Cortés

14 June 2013 3	FC Barcelona Regal	72–84	Real Madrid	Barcelona
22:00	Scoring by quarter: 13–17, 22–24, 15–15, 22–28
	Pts: Navarro 20; Rebs: Wallace 6 Asts: Sada 3 PIR: Wallace 13	Boxscore	Pts: Reyes 20; Rebs: Reyes, Slaughter 5 Asts: Llull 5 PIR: Reyes 26	Arena: Palau Blaugrana; Attendance: 7,562; Referees: Juan Carlos Arteaga, Miguel Ángel Pérez Pérez, Benjamín Jiménez

16 June 2013 4	FC Barcelona Regal	73–62	Real Madrid	Barcelona
19:00	Scoring by quarter: 23–17, 11–15, 15–13, 24–17
	Pts: Tomić 18; Rebs: Tomić 11; Asts: Huertas 6 PIR: Tomić 26	Boxscore	Pts: Reyes 10; Rebs: Reyes 6 Asts: Fernández, Rodríguez 2 PIR: Reyes 10	Arena: Palau Blaugrana; Attendance: 7,219; Referees: Daniel Hierrezuelo, Antonio Conde, Juan Carlos García González

19 June 2013 5	Real Madrid	79–71	FC Barcelona Regal	Madrid
22:00	Scoring by quarter: 20–18, 21–14, 14–16, 24–23
	Pts: Fernández 15; Rebs: Darden 7 Asts: Llull 5 PIR: Darden 16	Boxscore	Pts: Ingles 25; Rebs: three players 6 Asts: Sada 3 PIR: Ingles 28	Arena: WiZink Center; Attendance: 12,832; Referees: Juan Carlos Arteaga, Antonio Conde, Benjamín Jiménez

=== EuroLeague ===
==== Results summary ====
Overall						Home					Away				
Pld	W	L	PF	PA	PD	W	L	PF	PA	PD	W	L	PF	PA	PD
24	22	2	1928	1636	+292	11	1	969	833	+136	11	1	959	803	+156

Source: Competitive matches

=== Regular season ===
==== Group A ====
Pos	Team	Pld	W	L	PF	PA	PD	Qualification
1	(Spain) FC Barcelona Regal	10	9 (Note: Tiebreaker: 1–1 (+18).)	1	774	636	+138	Advance to Top 16
2	(Russia) CSKA Moscow	10	9 (Note: Tiebreaker: 1–1 (−18).)	1	783	709	+74	Advance to Top 16
3	(Turkey) Beşiktaş	10	5	5	699	749	−50	Advance to Top 16
4	(Germany) Brose Baskets	10	3	7	740	807	−67	Advance to Top 16
5	(Lithuania) Lietuvos rytas	10	2 (Note: Tiebreaker: 1–1 (+7).)	8	670	724	−54	
6	(Serbia) Partizan	10	2 (Note: Tiebreaker: 1–1 (−7).)	8	731	772	−41	

Source: Euroleague

==== Matches ====
12 October 2012 1	FC Barcelona Regal (Spain)	72–60	(Germany) Brose Baskets Bamberg	Barcelona
18:30	Scoring by quarter: 26–9, 17–17, 21–18, 8–16
	Pts: Mickeal, Tomić 12; Rebs: Tomić 9 Asts: Tomić 4 PIR: Tomić 25	Boxscore	Pts: Nachbar 20; Rebs: Zirbes 6 Asts: Gipson 5 PIR: Nachbar 23	Arena: Palau Blaugrana; Attendance: 4,961; Referees: Recep Ankarali, Jakub Zamojski, Luis Lopes

18 October 2012 2	Lietuvos Rytas Vilnius (Lithuania)	49–67	(Spain) FC Barcelona Regal	Vilnius
18:30	Scoring by quarter: 9–13, 17–14, 11–20, 13–20
	Pts: Radošević 11; Rebs: Katelynas 9 Asts: Seibutis 6 PIR: Radošević 9	Boxscore	Pts: Navarro 13; Rebs: Tomić, Wallace 6 Asts: Huertas, Navarro 4 PIR: Mickeal, Navarro 14	Arena: Siemens Arena; Attendance: 4,900; Referees: Luigi Lamonica, Emin Mogulkoc, Petri Mantyla

25 October 2012 3	FC Barcelona Regal (Spain)	72–60	(Turkey) Beşiktaş Istanbul	Barcelona
20:45	Scoring by quarter: 20–18, 16–16, 17–12, 19–14
	Pts: Jawai 14; Rebs: Jawai 8 Asts: Ingles 3 PIR: Jawai 17	Boxscore	Pts: Jerrells 18; Rebs: Özer 5 Asts: Açık, Jerrells 3 PIR: Jerrells 15	Arena: Palau Blaugrana; Attendance: 4,295; Referees: Milivoje Jovcic, Spiros Gkontas, Tomas Jasevicius

1 November 2012 4	FC Barcelona Regal (Spain)	85–82	(Serbia) Partizan m:ts Belgrade	Barcelona
20:45	Scoring by quarter: 23–15, 14–22, 30–18, 18–27
	Pts: Huertas 24; Rebs: three players 5 Asts: Huertas 9 PIR: Huertas 38	Boxscore	Pts: Musli 14; Rebs: Gordon 7 Asts: Thomas 4 PIR: Bertāns, Musli 14	Arena: Palau Blaugrana; Attendance: 5,713; Referees: Tolga Sahin, Elias Koromilas, Renaud Geller

8 November 2012 5	CSKA Moscow (Russia)	74–84	(Spain) FC Barcelona Regal	Moscow
17:00	Scoring by quarter: 19–17, 16–21, 13–25, 12–18
	Pts: Krstić 18; Rebs: Khryapa 6 Asts: Khryapa 4 PIR: Teodosić 14	Boxscore	Pts: Navarro 21; Rebs: Jawai 7 Asts: Ingles 4 PIR: Navarro 20	Arena: USH CSKA; Attendance: 5,238; Referees: Carl Jungebrand, Eddie Viator, Damir Javor

15 November 2012 6	Brose Baskets Bamberg (Germany)	66–86	(Spain) FC Barcelona Regal	Bamberg
19:00	Scoring by quarter: 22–23, 20–24, 11–17, 13–22
	Pts: Nachbar 18; Rebs: Nachbar, Zirbes 8 Asts: Nachbar 4 PIR: Nachbar 16	Boxscore	Pts: Mickeal 17; Rebs: Mickeal 7 Asts: four players 3 PIR: Mickeal 21	Arena: Stechert Arena; Attendance: 6,800; Referees: Borys Ryzhyk, Petri Mantyla, Sergio Silva

22 November 2012 7	FC Barcelona Regal (Spain)	90–66	(Lithuania) Lietuvos Rytas Vilnius	Barcelona
20:45	Scoring by quarter: 27–18, 15–27, 26–15, 22–6
	Pts: Navarro 24; Rebs: Tomić 7 Asts: Sada 7 PIR: Tomić 28	Boxscore	Pts: Radošević 14; Rebs: Ivanov 6 Asts: Blūms, Katelynas 2 PIR: Ivanov 10	Arena: Palau Blaugrana; Attendance: 4,474; Referees: Ilija Belošević, Carmelo Paternico, Luis Lopes

30 November 2012 8	Beşiktaş Istanbul (Turkey)	48–78	(Spain) FC Barcelona Regal	Istanbul
19:00	Scoring by quarter: 14–18, 10–21, 14–23, 10–16
	Pts: Vidmar 18; Rebs: Vidmar 6 Asts: Jerrells 2 PIR: Vidmar 24	Boxscore	Pts: Ingles 22; Rebs: Wallace 8 Asts: Jasikevičius 5 PIR: Ingles 20	Arena: Abdi İpekçi Sports Hall; Attendance: 9,150; Referees: Christos Christodoulou, Sinisa Herceg, Joseph Bissang

6 December 2012 9	Partizan m:ts Belgrade (Serbia)	67–68(OT)	(Spain) FC Barcelona Regal	Belgrade
20:45	Scoring by quarter: 14–13, 16–12, 14–18, 14–15, Overtime: 9–10
	Pts: Milosavljević 14; Rebs: Gordon 9 Asts: Westermann 5 PIR: Milosavljević 16	Boxscore	Pts: Navarro 10; Rebs: Wallace 9 Asts: Jasikevičius, Wallace 2 PIR: Jawai 13	Arena: Pionir Hall; Attendance: 7,500; Referees: Robert Lottermoser, Jakub Zamojski, Anastasios Piloidis

13 December 2012 10	FC Barcelona Regal (Spain)	75–78	(Russia) CSKA Moscow	Barcelona
20:45	Scoring by quarter: 19–24, 28–17, 11–14, 17–23
	Pts: Navarro 17; Rebs: Sada 4 Asts: Navarro 3 PIR: Navarro 14	Boxscore	Pts: Krstić 15; Rebs: three players 5 Asts: three players 3 PIR: Teodosić 20	Arena: Palau Blaugrana; Attendance: 5,026; Referees: Luigi Lamonica, Nicola Maestre, Oļegs Latiševs

=== Top 16 ===
==== Group E ====
Pos	Team	Pld	W	L	PF	PA	PD	Qualification
1	(Spain) FC Barcelona Regal	14	13	1	1151	986	+165	Advance to quarterfinals
2	(Greece) Olympiacos	14	9	5	1068	1033	+35	Advance to quarterfinals
3	(Israel) Maccabi Tel Aviv	14	8	6	1105	1012	+93	Advance to quarterfinals
4	(Spain) Laboral Kutxa	14	8	6	1093	1045	+48	Advance to quarterfinals
5	(Russia) Khimki	14	7	7	1133	1051	+82	
6	(Italy) Montepaschi Siena	14	7	7	1036	1057	−21	
7	(Turkey) Beşiktaş	14	2	12	893	1104	−211	
8	(Turkey) Fenerbahçe Ülker	14	2	12	1055	1246	−191	

Source: Euroleague

==== Matches ====
28 December 2012 1	FC Barcelona Regal (Spain)	100–78	(Turkey) Fenerbahçe Ülker Istanbul	Barcelona
20:45	Scoring by quarter: 24–13, 30–22, 25–25, 21–18
	Pts: Huertas, Navarro 14; Rebs: Tomić 11; Asts: Huertas, Sada 6 PIR: Tomić 27	Boxscore	Pts: Bogdanović 19; Rebs: Sato 4 Asts: Sato 5 PIR: Sato 21	Arena: Palau Blaugrana; Attendance: 4,693; Referees: Milivoje Jovcic, Eddie Viator, Boris Shulga

3 January 2013 2	Khimki Moscow Region (Russia)	78–65	(Spain) FC Barcelona Regal	Khimki
17:00	Scoring by quarter: 21–18, 25–23, 16–14, 16–10
	Pts: Planinić 16; Rebs: Augustine, Davis 8 Asts: Planinić 6 PIR: Augustine 15	Boxscore	Pts: Tomić 16; Rebs: Lorbek 8 Asts: Huertas 3 PIR: Tomić 20	Arena: Khimki Basketball Center; Attendance: 4,999; Referees: Grzegorz Ziemblicki, Spiros Gkontas, Roberto Chiari

11 January 2013 3	FC Barcelona Regal (Spain)	76–68	(Greece) Olympiacos Piraeus	Barcelona
20:45	Scoring by quarter: 18–13, 23–19, 19–20, 16–16
	Pts: Tomić 15; Rebs: Tomić 12; Asts: Huertas 3 PIR: Tomić 22	Boxscore	Pts: Printezis 14; Rebs: Hines 9 Asts: Spanoulis 5 PIR: Antić, Printezis 14	Arena: Palau Blaugrana; Attendance: 6,593; Referees: Ilija Belošević, Paolo Taurino, Rustu Nuran

17 January 2013 4	Beşiktaş Istanbul (Turkey)	59–73	(Spain) FC Barcelona Regal	Istanbul
20:45	Scoring by quarter: 10–15, 22–19, 16–17, 11–22
	Pts: Jerrells 17; Rebs: Markota 8 Asts: Güler 5 PIR: Vidmar 16	Boxscore	Pts: Tomić 15; Rebs: Wallace 8 Asts: Wallace 6 PIR: Tomić 21	Arena: Abdi İpekçi Sports Hall; Attendance: 5,639; Referees: Christos Christodoulou, Nicola Maestre, Elias Koromilas

24 January 2013 5	Laboral Kutxa Vitoria (Spain)	79–90	(Spain) FC Barcelona Regal	Vitoria-Gasteiz
20:15	Scoring by quarter: 28–27, 19–23, 13–19, 19–21
	Pts: Lampe 21; Rebs: Lampe 11; Asts: Heurtel, Lampe 3 PIR: Lampe 35	Boxscore	Pts: Mickeal 23; Rebs: Lorbek, Mickeal 5 Asts: Huertas 4 PIR: Mickeal 24	Arena: Buesa Arena; Attendance: 15,068; Referees: Luigi Lamonica, Jakub Zamojski, Damir Javor

31 January 2013 6	FC Barcelona Regal (Spain)	85–66	(Italy) Montepaschi Siena	Barcelona
20:45	Scoring by quarter: 20–13, 28–16, 20–18, 17–19
	Pts: Tomić 20; Rebs: Tomić 5 Asts: Huertas, Tomić 5 PIR: Tomić 28	Boxscore	Pts: Brown 19; Rebs: Kangur 6 Asts: Brown 4 PIR: Brown 20	Arena: Palau Blaugrana; Attendance: 5,972; Referees: Sreten Radovic, Matej Boltauzer, Robert Lottermoser

14 February 2013 7	Maccabi Electra Tel Aviv (Israel)	77–82	(Spain) FC Barcelona Regal	Tel Aviv
20:05	Scoring by quarter: 22–20, 17–21, 14–26, 24–15
	Pts: Hickman 19; Rebs: Caner-Medley 5 Asts: Ohayon 6 PIR: Hickman 20	Boxscore	Pts: Tomić 18; Rebs: Sada 7 Asts: four players 3 PIR: Tomić 20	Arena: Nokia Arena; Attendance: 11,060; Referees: Borys Ryzhyk, Tolga Sahin, Milija Vojinovic

21 February 2013 8	Fenerbahçe Ülker Istanbul (Turkey)	60–99	(Spain) FC Barcelona Regal	Istanbul
18:45	Scoring by quarter: 13–23, 6–27, 21–26, 20–23
	Pts: Bogdanović 18; Rebs: Andersen 6 Asts: Preldžić 7 PIR: Bogdanović 18	Boxscore	Pts: Mickeal 17; Rebs: Jawai 7 Asts: Huertas, Navarro 4 PIR: Huertas 27	Arena: Ülker Sports and Event Hall; Attendance: 6,220; Referees: Christos Christodoulou, Eddie Viator, Nicola Maestre

28 February 2013 9	FC Barcelona Regal (Spain)	71–69	(Russia) Khimki Moscow Region	Barcelona
20:45	Scoring by quarter: 21–16, 23–18, 16–14, 11–21
	Pts: Navarro 19; Rebs: Tomić 5 Asts: Sada 5 PIR: Navarro 19	Boxscore	Pts: Davis 18; Rebs: Davis 9 Asts: Rivers 3 PIR: Davis 23	Arena: Palau Blaugrana; Attendance: 5,344; Referees: Ilija Belošević, Recep Ankarali, Luis Lopes

7 March 2013 10	Olympiacos Piraeus (Greece)	77–90	(Spain) FC Barcelona Regal	Piraeus
20:45	Scoring by quarter: 20–17, 16–29, 26–17, 15–27
	Pts: Spanoulis 23; Rebs: Printezis 7 Asts: three players 3 PIR: Spanoulis 22	Boxscore	Pts: Lorbek 21; Rebs: Jawai 8 Asts: Huertas 6 PIR: Lorbek 20	Arena: Peace and Friendship Stadium; Attendance: 10,920; Referees: Luigi Lamonica, Jakub Zamojski, Gianluca Mattioli

15 March 2013 11	FC Barcelona Regal (Spain)	86–61	(Turkey) Beşiktaş Istanbul	Barcelona
20:45	Scoring by quarter: 29–15, 18–16, 20–19, 19–11
	Pts: Jawai 16; Rebs: Jawai 9 Asts: Huertas, Jasikevičius 6 PIR: Jawai 26	Boxscore	Pts: Özer 18; Rebs: Özer 6 Asts: Çetin 4 PIR: Özer 19	Arena: Palau Blaugrana; Attendance: 4,578; Referees: Robert Lottermoser, Srdan Dozai, Milija Vojinovic

21 March 2013 12	FC Barcelona Regal (Spain)	83–74	(Spain) Laboral Kutxa Vitoria	Barcelona
20:45	Scoring by quarter: 18–12, 24–10, 19–24, 22–18
	Pts: Lorbek 16; Rebs: Tomić 8 Asts: Huertas, Navarro 6 PIR: Tomić 22	Boxscore	Pts: Lampe 21; Rebs: Lampe, Pleiß 6 Asts: Cook, Heurtel 3 PIR: Lampe 22	Arena: Palau Blaugrana; Attendance: 4,773; Referees: Christos Christodoulou, Tolga Sahin, Damir Javor

29 March 2013 13	Montepaschi Siena (Italy)	69–77	(Spain) FC Barcelona Regal	Siena
20:45	Scoring by quarter: 25–23, 15–22, 15–20, 14–12
	Pts: Brown 15; Rebs: three players 5 Asts: Brown 6 PIR: Ress 12	Boxscore	Pts: Jawai 22; Rebs: Jawai 12; Asts: Huertas 6 PIR: Jawai 34	Arena: PalaEstra; Attendance: 5,065; Referees: Ilija Belošević, Sreten Radovic, Joseph Bissang

4 April 2013 14	FC Barcelona Regal (Spain)	74–71	(Israel) Maccabi Electra Tel Aviv	Barcelona
20:45	Scoring by quarter: 19–19, 17–13, 15–24, 23–15
	Pts: Abrines 21; Rebs: Jawai, Tomić 8 Asts: Jasikevičius 4 PIR: Abrines 28	Boxscore	Pts: Hickman, Smith 16; Rebs: James, Smith 7 Asts: James, Logan 3 PIR: Hickman 14	Arena: Palau Blaugrana; Attendance: 5,199; Referees: Luigi Lamonica, Milivoje Jovcic, Jakub Zamojski

=== Quarterfinals ===
9 April 2013 1	FC Barcelona Regal (Spain)	72–70(OT)	(Greece) Panathinaikos Athens	Barcelona
20:00	Scoring by quarter: 11–21, 23–11, 11–19, 19–13, Overtime: 8–6
	Pts: Navarro 14; Rebs: Tomić 12; Asts: Jasikevičius 5 PIR: Tomić 19	Boxscore	Pts: Gist, Lasme 14; Rebs: Diamantidis, Tsartsaris 7 Asts: Ukić 7 PIR: Diamantidis 16	Arena: Palau Blaugrana; Attendance: 6,195; Referees: Ilija Belošević, Tolga Sahin, Joseph Bissang

11 April 2013 2	FC Barcelona Regal (Spain)	65–66	(Greece) Panathinaikos Athens	Barcelona
20:45	Scoring by quarter: 11–16, 21–11, 18–21, 15–18
	Pts: Navarro 20; Rebs: Tomić 7 Asts: Huertas 4 PIR: Navarro 16	Boxscore	Pts: Gist 14; Rebs: Gist, Lasme 7 Asts: Diamantidis, Ukić 3 PIR: Gist 17	Arena: Palau Blaugrana; Attendance: 6,698; Referees: Borys Ryzhyk, Eddie Viator, Carmelo Paternico

16 April 2013 3	Panathinaikos Athens (Greece)	65–63	(Spain) FC Barcelona Regal	Marousi
20:45	Scoring by quarter: 20–10, 18–19, 12–22, 15–12
	Pts: Bramos 14; Rebs: Lasme 8 Asts: Schortsanitis 3 PIR: Bramos, Lasme 13	Boxscore	Pts: Navarro 17; Rebs: Tomić 9 Asts: three players 2 PIR: Tomić 23	Arena: OAKA Basketball Arena; Attendance: 17,800; Referees: Luigi Lamonica, Robert Lottermoser, Damir Javor

18 April 2013 4	Panathinaikos Athens (Greece)	60–70	(Spain) FC Barcelona Regal	Marousi
20:45	Scoring by quarter: 10–20, 17–11, 11–20, 22–19
	Pts: Bramos 15; Rebs: Lasme 12; Asts: Diamantidis 6 PIR: Lasme 19	Boxscore	Pts: Navarro 17; Rebs: Huertas 6 Asts: Huertas 6 PIR: Tomić 21	Arena: OAKA Basketball Arena; Attendance: 18,300; Referees: Borys Ryzhyk, Milivoje Jovcic, Matej Boltauzer

25 April 2013 1	FC Barcelona Regal (Spain)	64–53	(Greece) Panathinaikos Athens	Barcelona
21:00	Scoring by quarter: 28–14, 16–19, 7–10, 13–10
	Pts: Navarro 15; Rebs: Ingles, Tomić 7 Asts: three players 2 PIR: Jawai 21	Boxscore	Pts: Lasme 16; Rebs: Lasme 7 Asts: Diamantidis 3 PIR: Lasme 20	Arena: Palau Blaugrana; Attendance: 7,585; Referees: Luigi Lamonica, Jakub Zamojski, Oļegs Latiševs

=== Final Four ===
==== Semifinals ====
10 May 2013	FC Barcelona Regal (Spain)	67–74	(Spain) Real Madrid	London
21:00	Scoring by quarter: 18–11, 15–28, 18–9, 16–26
	Pts: Huertas 19; Rebs: Tomić 12; Asts: Wallace 3 PIR: Tomić 34	Boxscore	Pts: Reyes 17; Rebs: Carroll 6 Asts: Rodríguez 9 PIR: Reyes 23	Arena: The O2 Arena; Attendance: 13,193; Referees: Luigi Lamonica, Ilija Belošević, Elias Koromilas

==== Third place game ====
12 May 2013	CSKA Moscow (Russia)	74–73	(Spain) FC Barcelona Regal	London
18:00	Scoring by quarter: 15–12, 20–23, 24–19, 15–19
	Pts: Khryapa 16; Rebs: Teodosić, Vorontsevich 5 Asts: Teodosić 5 PIR: Khryapa 19	Boxscore	Pts: Navarro 17; Rebs: Tomić 6 Asts: Jasikevičius 6 PIR: Todorović 20	Arena: The O2 Arena; Attendance: 10,716; Referees: Robert Lottermoser, Matej Boltauzer, Elias Koromilas

=== Copa del Rey ===
==== Quarterfinals ====
7 February 2013	Real Madrid	108–111(OT)	FC Barcelona Regal	Vitoria-Gasteiz
19:00	Scoring by quarter: 18–25, 28–24, 14–15, 17–13, Overtime: 16–16, 15–18
	Pts: Llull 23; Rebs: Fernández 7 Asts: Rodríguez 8 PIR: Rodríguez 23	Boxscore	Pts: Mickeal 26; Rebs: Tomić 11; Asts: Huertas 10; PIR: Tomić 33	Arena: Buesa Arena; Attendance: 14,500; Referees: Daniel Hierrezuelo, Vicente Bultó, Benjamín Jiménez

==== Semifinals ====
9 February 2013	Caja Laboral	69–80	FC Barcelona Regal	Vitoria-Gasteiz
19:00	Scoring by quarter: 19–18, 20–17, 18–20, 12–25
	Pts: Lampe 15; Rebs: Lampe, Nocioni 5 Asts: Heurtel 4 PIR: Nocioni 17	Boxscore	Pts: Navarro 20; Rebs: Tomić 10; Asts: Huertas 9 PIR: Navarro 18	Arena: Buesa Arena; Attendance: 15,085; Referees: Juan Carlos Arteaga, Emilio Pérez Pizarro, Benjamín Jiménez

==== Final ====
10 February 2013	FC Barcelona Regal	85–69	Valencia Basket	Vitoria-Gasteiz
19:00	Scoring by quarter: 17–18, 19–15, 25–20, 24–16
	Pts: Mickeal 14; Rebs: Lorbek 7 Asts: Huertas 8 PIR: Huertas 19	Boxscore	Pts: Doellman, Marković 14; Rebs: Doellman, Faverani 6 Asts: Ribas, San Miguel 3 PIR: Faverani 19	Arena: Buesa Arena; Attendance: 14,120; Referees: Juan Carlos Arteaga, Antonio Conde, Benjamín Jiménez

=== Supercopa de España ===
==== Semifinals ====
22 September 2012	FC Barcelona Regal	77–63	Valencia Basket	Zaragoza
19:00	Scoring by quarter: 22–12, 16–20, 19–17, 20–14
	Pts: Mickeal 15; Rebs: Lorbek 9 Asts: Huertas 5 PIR: Mickeal 24	Boxscore	Pts: Faverani 14; Rebs: Faverani 6 Asts: three players 2 PIR: Martínez 14	Arena: Príncipe Felipe; Attendance: 6,100; Referees: Emilio Pérez Pizarro, Antonio Conde, Carlos Peruga

==== Final ====
23 September 2012	FC Barcelona Regal	84–95	Real Madrid	Zaragoza
19:00	Scoring by quarter: 23–30, 20–14, 13–21, 28–30
	Pts: Jawai 20; Rebs: Ingles 5 Asts: Huertas 7 PIR: Ingles 21	Boxscore	Pts: Fernández 22; Rebs: three players 5 Asts: Rodríguez 3 PIR: Fernández 25	Arena: Príncipe Felipe; Attendance: 7,000; Referees: Emilio Pérez Pizarro, Antonio Conde, Juan Carlos García González

== Individual awards ==
=== Copa del Rey ===
Finals MVP

- (United States) Pete Mickeal

=== Liga ACB ===
Player of the Round

- (Brazil) Marcelinho Huertas – Round 9, Round 24
- (Spain) Juan Carlos Navarro – Round 15

Player of the Month

- (Croatia) Ante Tomić – February

All-Liga ACB Team

- (Croatia) Ante Tomić

=== EuroLeague ===
All-EuroLeague First Team

- (Croatia) Ante Tomić

All-EuroLeague Second Team

- (Spain) Juan Carlos Navarro

MVP of the Round

- (Croatia) Ante Tomić – Round 7 (Regular season), Round 1 (Top 16)
- (Australia) Nathan Jawai – Round 13 (Top 16), Game 5 (Quarter-finals)

MVP of the Month

- (Croatia) Ante Tomić – February
