= Lithuania national team =

Lithuania national team might refer to:

- Lithuania national badminton team
- Lithuania national baseball team
- Basketball
  - Lithuania men's national basketball team
  - Lithuania men's national U-21 basketball team
  - Lithuania men's national under-20 basketball team
  - Lithuania men's national under-18 and under-19 basketball team
  - Lithuania men's national under-16 and under-17 basketball team
  - Lithuania women's national basketball team
  - Lithuania women's national under-20 basketball team
  - Lithuania women's national under-19 basketball team
  - Lithuania women's national under-17 basketball team
- Lithuania national beach soccer team
- Lithuania men's national canoe polo team
- Field hockey
  - Lithuania men's national field hockey team
  - Lithuania women's national field hockey team
- Football
  - Lithuania national football team
  - Lithuania national under-21 football team
  - Lithuania national under-19 football team
  - Lithuania national under-18 football team
  - Lithuania national under-17 football team
  - Lithuania women's national football team
  - Lithuania women's national under-17 football team
- Lithuania national futsal team
- Handball
  - Lithuania men's national handball team
  - Lithuania women's national handball team
- Ice hockey
  - Lithuania men's national ice hockey team
  - Lithuania men's national junior ice hockey team
  - Lithuania men's national under-18 ice hockey team
  - Lithuania women's national ice hockey team
- Lithuania national rugby league team
- Rugby union
  - Lithuania national rugby union team
  - Lithuania national rugby sevens team
  - Lithuania women's national rugby sevens team
- Softball
- Tennis
  - Lithuania Davis Cup team
  - Lithuania Fed Cup team
- Volleyball
  - Lithuania men's national volleyball team
  - Lithuania women's national volleyball team
- Lithuania men's national water polo team
