= FIBA Africa Under-20 Championship =

International basketball tournament

The FIBA Africa Under-20 Championship was a basketball competition in the International Basketball Federation's FIBA Africa zone. The event was held four times before being cancelled in 2004. The winner competed in the FIBA Under-21 World Championship.

== Summary ==
Year	Host	Final			Third-place game		
Year	Host	Champion	Score	Second Place	Third Place	Score	Fourth Place
1992; Details	?	Angola	–			–	
1996; Details	(Morocco); Casablanca	Egypt	round robin	Tunisia	Ivory Coast	round robin	Morocco
2000; Details	(Guinea); Conakry	Egypt	round robin	Tunisia	Algeria	round robin	Libya
2004; Details	(Senegal); Dakar	Nigeria	83–82	Cameroon	Angola	62–58	Senegal

== Participating nations ==
Nation		(Morocco)	(Guinea)	(Senegal)	
Nation	1992	1996	2000	2004	
Nation	x	5	4	10	
Algeria		5	2000	7	3
Angola	1992			2004	2
Cameroon				2004	1
(Democratic Republic of the Congo) DR Congo				10	1
Egypt		1996	2000		2
Ivory Coast		1996			1
Libya			4		1
Morocco		4			1
Mauritania				8	1
Mali				9	1
Morocco				6	1
Nigeria				2004	1
Senegal				4	1
Tunisia		1996	2000	5	3
# Teams		5	4	10	

== World U-21 Championship record ==
Team	(Spain); 1993	(Australia); 1997	(Japan); 2001	(Argentina); 2005	Total
Angola	10				1
Egypt		10	9		2
Nigeria				9	1
Total	1	1	1	1	4

== See also ==
- FIBA Africa Championship
- FIBA Africa Under-18 Championship
- FIBA Africa Under-16 Championship
