= Tunisia men's national under-20 basketball team =

Tunisia
- Joined FIBA: 1956
- FIBA zone: FIBA Africa
- National federation: FTBB
- Nickname(s): نسور قرطاج (Eagles of Carthage)

U21 World Championships
- Appearances: None
- Medals: None

U20 Africa Championships
- Appearances: 3
- Medals: Silver (silver) : 1996, 2000
Home	Away
Medal record
Event	1st	2nd	3rd
U20 Africa Championships	0	2	0
Total	0	2	0

The Tunisia men's national under-20 basketball team (Arabic: منتخب تونس تحت 20 سنة لكرة السلة للرجال), nicknamed Les Aigles de Carthage (The Eagles of Carthage or The Carthage Eagles), is governed by the Tunisia Basketball Federation (FTBB). (Arabic: الجامعة التونسية لكرة السلة) It represents the country in international under-21 and under-20 (under age 20) basketball competitions.

== Competitive record ==
Champions Runners-up Third place Fourth place

- Red border color indicates tournament was held on home soil.

=== FIBA Under-21 World Championship ===
FIBA Under-21 World Championship
Appearances : 0
Year	Position	Host
(Spain) 1993	Did not participate	Valladolid, Spain
(Australia) 1997	Did not participate	Melbourne, Australia
(Japan) 2001	Did not participate	Saitama, Japan
(Argentina) 2005	Did not participate	Mar del Plata, Argentina

=== FIBA Africa Under-20 Championship ===
FIBA Africa Under-20 Championship
Appearances : 3
Year	Position	Host
1992	Did not participate	
(Morocco) 1996	2nd Silver (silver)	Casablanca, Morocco
(Guinea) 2000	2nd Silver (silver)	Conakry, Guinea
(Senegal) 2004	5th	Dakar, Senegal

== See also ==
- Tunisia national basketball team
- Tunisia national under-19 basketball team
- Tunisia national under-17 basketball team
- Tunisia women's national under-20 basketball team
