= Loukas Mavrokefalidis =

Greek basketball player (born 1984)

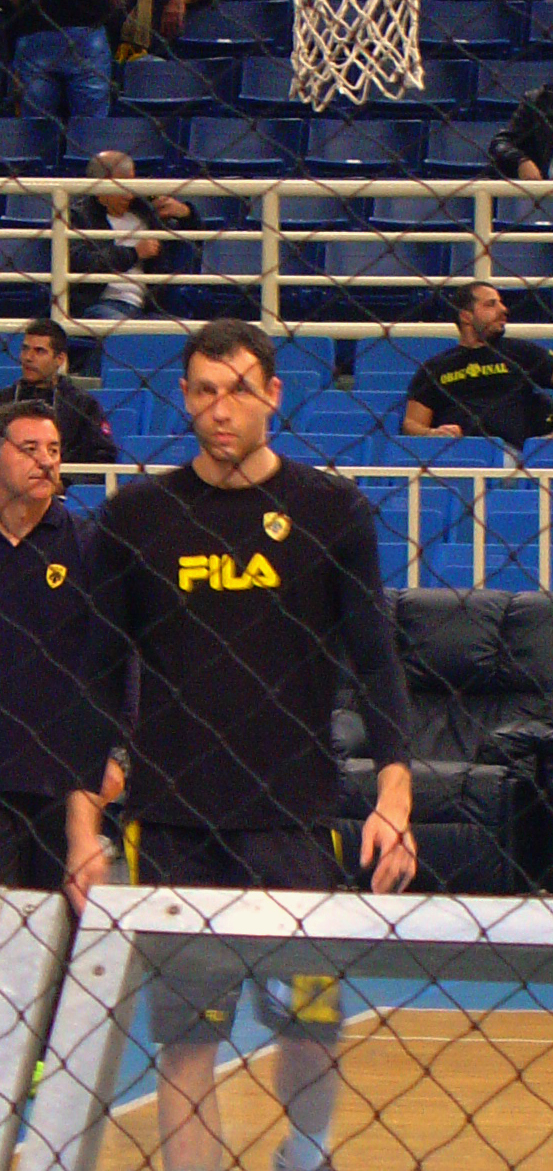
- Mavrokefalidis warming up with AEK Athens in 2015

Personal information
- Born: 25 July 1984 (age 42) Jeseník, Czechoslovakia
- Listed height: 6 ft 10.75 in (2.10 m)
- Listed weight: 265 lb (120 kg)

Career information
- NBA draft: 2006: 2nd round, 57th overall pick
- Drafted by: Minnesota Timberwolves
- Playing career: 2002–2024
- Position: Center / power forward

Career history
- 2002–2006: PAOK Thessaloniki
- 2006–2007: Virtus Roma
- 2007: →Valencia
- 2007–2011: Olympiacos
- 2008–2009: →Maroussi
- 2011–2013: Spartak St. Petersburg
- 2013: FC Barcelona
- 2013–2015: Panathinaikos
- 2015–2016: AEK Athens
- 2016–2017: Qingdao Eagles
- 2017: AEK Athens
- 2017–2018: Lietuvos Rytas Vilnius
- 2018–2019: Ionikos Nikaias
- 2019–2020: Promitheas Patras
- 2020: Peristeri
- 2020–2021: Ionikos Nikaias
- 2021–2022: Tritonas Sepolion
- 2022–2023: Ionikos Nikaias
- 2023-2024: Ethnikos Livadeias

Career highlights
- All-EuroCup Second Team (2013); Greek League champion (2014); 4× Greek Cup winner (2010, 2011, 2014, 2015); Greek League Top Scorer (2016); Greek League Domestic Player of the Year (2016); 2× All-Greek League Team (2015, 2016); Greek League Most Improved Player (2006); 6× Greek All Star (2006, 2009, 2011, 2014, 2020, 2022); Greek Cup Finals MVP (2015); Greek 2nd Division champion (2019); Greek 2nd Division Top Scorer (2019); Greek 2nd Division rebounding leader (2019)
- Stats at Basketball Reference
Medals
Men's basketball
Representing Greece
FIBA U-19 World Cup
Bronze medal – third place	2003 Thessaloniki	Under-19
FIBA U-21 World Cup
Silver medal – second place	2005 Mar del Plata	Under-21

Loukas Mavrokefalidis (alternate spelling: Mavrokefalides) (Greek: Λουκάς Μαυροκεφαλίδης; born 25 July 1984) is a Greek former professional basketball player. He has also represented the senior Hellenic national team. Born in Jeseník, Czechoslovakia, he is a 2.10 m (6'10 3/4"), 120 kg (265 lbs.) power forward and center. He was selected by the Minnesota Timberwolves in the 2nd round (57th overall) of the 2006 NBA draft.

== Professional career ==
=== Europe ===
Mavrokefalidis started his professional career with PAOK, after moving to Thessaloniki from Kilkis, where his parents come from. From the first days of his professional career, PAOK head coach Bane Prelević took advantage of his height and decided to play him at the center position, which, as it was proved later in his career, fit him very well.

Mavrokefalidis played for PAOK in the Greek Basket League during the Greek League 2005–06 season, averaging 16.7 points and 8.4 rebounds per game. He played in the Greek All-Star Game and he won the Greek League's Most Improved Player Award that year. After many months of hard work, Mavrokefalidis was almost always a member of the starting five in PAOK, creating havoc to the opposition's defense with his ability to get to the rim and make easy buckets or exciting dunks. He also became a defensive force, chasing down rebounds relentlessly, something that can be shown by the 8.4 rebounds per game that he averaged during the 2005–06 season.

During the summer of 2006, Mavrokefalidis was signed by Virtus Roma of the Italian League and EuroLeague, but he was not established as a key member of the team, averaging just 2 points and 1 rebound per game. In February 2007, he was transferred from Roma to Pamesa Valencia of the Spanish ACB League, in exchange for Roberto Chiacig and Jon Stefánsson. On 12 July 2007 Mavrokefalidis joined Olympiacos. In 2008, Mavrokefalidis moved to Maroussi. In 2009, he re-signed with Olympiacos through the 2010–11 season.

In 2011, Mavrokefalidis was signed by the Russian League club Spartak Saint Petersburg to a 2-year contract worth €2.4 million euros net income. He was named to the All-EuroCup Second Team in 2013. He signed with the Spanish League club FC Barcelona in May 2013.

On 10 July 2013, even though the Greek media were saying that Mavrokefalidis was very close to signing with Olympiacos, he was instead announced as a signing of Panathinaikos. In the 2015 Greek Basket League playoffs, he was the best player for Panathinaikos, averaging 18.4 points, 8.1 rebounds (5.8 offensive rebounds), and 2.2 assists per game.

On 10 August 2015 he signed a one-year deal with AEK Athens. Mavrokefalidis was the top scorer of AEK Athens in the 2015–16 Greek Basket League season, averaging 14.5 points per game.

=== China ===
In December 2016, Mavrokefalidis joined the Chinese Basketball Association (CBA) club Qingdao DoubleStar Eagles for the 2016–17 CBA season. He became the first Greek player to ever play in China. He averaged 19.2 points, 8.8 rebounds, 2.3 assists, and 1.5 steals per game.

=== Back to Europe ===
On 20 February 2017 Mavrokefalidis returned to the Greek club AEK Athens, signing a contract with them for the rest of the season. On 25 September 2017 Mavrokefalidis signed with Lithuanian club Lietuvos rytas Vilnius, for the 2017–18 season.

In 2018, he joined the Greek A2 League club Ionikos Nikaias. On 23 December 2019 after a very productive and successful stint with Ionikos, Mavrokefalidis transferred to the Greek EuroCup club Promitheas Patras, in order to replace Georgios Bogris on the club's roster.

Mavrokefalidis signed with Peristeri on 3 July 2020. On 8 December 2020 he returned to Ionikos, after a fallout with newly appointed Peristeri coach (and his former Panathinaikos boss), Argyris Pedoulakis.

Mavrokefalidis started the 2021-22 campaign with 2nd division club Tritonas Sepolion, bringing them to the brink of Greek Basket League promotion, before returning once again to Ionikos Nikaias and helping them avoid relegation. In 6 games with Ionikos, he averaged 19.3 points, 7.8 rebounds and 2.5 assists, playing around 30 minutes per contest.

On 1 September 2022 Mavrokefalidis renewed his contract with Ionikos. In 17 games during the 2022–23 season, he averaged 21.1 points, 7.7 rebounds and 2.9 assists per contest.

== National team career ==
=== Greek junior national team ===
Mavrokefalidis helped Greece win the bronze medal at the 2003 FIBA Under-19 World Cup. He also played at the 2004 FIBA Europe Under-20 Championship. In 2005, Mavrokefalidis' contribution during the FIBA Under-21 World Cup was very significant, as Mavrokefalidis greatly helped the Greece men's national under-21 basketball team win the silver medal, after losing to Lithuania by just two points in the gold medal game.

=== Greek men's national team ===
A year later, in 2006, the Greece men's national basketball team head coach Panagiotis Giannakis was impressed by the Mavrokefalidis' abilities and called him to participate in the Greek men's basketball training camp, one month before the 2006 FIBA World Championship took place in Japan. However, as he was selected in the 2006 NBA draft by the Minnesota Timberwolves, Mavrokefalidis informed the coach shortly before the outset of the World Championship that he had decided to go back to Minnesota and participate in performance improvement training camps, and thus he lost the team's 12th man roster place to Sofoklis Schortsanitis.

In 2011, Mavrokefalidis was given a 2-month suspension from all competitions by the Hellenic Basketball Federation, for refusing to play for Greece's national team for the second consecutive summer. However, two years later, he played with the Greek senior men's national team at the EuroBasket 2013.

== Career statistics ==
=== Domestic leagues ===
==== Regular season ====
Legend
GP	Games played	MPG	Minutes per game	FG%	Field goal percentage
3P%	3-point field goal percentage	FT%	Free throw percentage	RPG	Rebounds per game
APG	Assists per game	SPG	Steals per game	BPG	Blocks per game
PPG	Points per game	**Bold**	Career high		Led the league

Note: Only games in the primary domestic competitions are included. Therefore, games in cup or European competitions are left out.

Year	Team	League	GP	MPG	FG%	3P%	FT%	RPG	APG	SPG	BPG	PPG
2001–02	PAOK	GBL	2	3.4	.000	.000	.000	1.5	0.0	0.0	0.0	0.0
2002–03	PAOK	GBL	6	4.3	.636	.000	**1.000**	0.8	0.1	0.3	0.1	3.0
2003–04	PAOK	GBL	19	11.3	.535	.500	.861	3.6	0.4	0.3	0.4	4.9
2004–05	PAOK	GBL	14	7.0	.423	.000	.562	1.7	0.1	0.2	0.1	2.2
2005–06	PAOK	GBL	**26**	**31.5**	.553	.276	.796	**8.1**	1.0	**0.7**	**0.5**	**16.5**
2007–08	Olympiacos	GBL	17	9.4	.534	.000	.800	2.3	0.8	0.2	0.1	3.1
2008–09	Maroussi	GBL	**26**	24.2	.485	.280	.811	5.7	1.1	0.6	**0.5**	12.0
2009–10	Olympiacos	GBL	20	15.0	**.644**	.400	.851	2.9	0.9	0.6	0.3	7.9
2010–11	Olympiacos	GBL	24	17.2	.548	**1.000**	.790	4.2	0.7	0.5	**0.5**	9.0
2013–14	Panathinaikos	GBL	25	13.3	.579	.400	.756	3.7	1.2	0.3	0.2	6.8
2014–15	Panathinaikos	GBL	19	12.2	.441	.400	.678	3.2	0.9	**0.7**	0.3	5.2
2015–16	AEK Athens	GBL	**26**	25.3	.459	.431	.810	6.7	**2.0**	**0.7**	0.4	14.5

==== Playoffs ====
Year	Team	League	GP	MPG	FG%	3P%	FT%	RPG	APG	SPG	BPG	PPG
2001–02	PAOK	GBL	2	1.3	**1.000**	.000	.000	1.0	0.0	0.0	0.0	2.0
2003–04	PAOK	GBL	2	5.1	**1.000**	.000	.500	0.0	0.0	0.0	0.0	1.5
2005–06	PAOK	GBL	3	**28.1**	.434	.000	.500	4.6	1.0	0.3	**1.0**	7.0
2007–08	Olympiacos	GBL	7	13.1	.700	.500	**1.000**	2.4	0.2	0.4	0.0	3.1
2008–09	Maroussi	GBL	**10**	23.2	.476	.166	.862	5.0	1.6	**0.7**	0.3	10.7
2009–10	Olympiacos	GBL	9	8.4	.551	**1.000**	.888	1.5	0.1	0.3	0.0	4.5
2010–11	Olympiacos	GBL	9	21.3	.571	.000	.772	3.2	1.4	0.4	0.2	11.6
2013–14	Panathinaikos	GBL	**10**	15.2	.465	.500	.823	3.6	0.7	0.5	0.7	10.9
2014–15	Panathinaikos	GBL	9	26.0	.548	.384	.678	**8.1**	**2.2**	**0.7**	0.3	**18.4**

=== FIBA Champions League ===
Year	Team	GP	MPG	FG%	3P%	FT%	RPG	APG	SPG	BPG	PPG
2016–17	A.E.K.	2	21.3	.312	-	.857	9.0	1.0	1.5	0	11.0

== Awards and accomplishments ==
=== Greek junior national team ===
- 2003 FIBA Under-19 World Cup: Bronze
- 2005 FIBA Under-21 World Cup: Silver

=== Pro clubs ===
- 6× Greek League All-Star: 2006, 2009, 2011, 2014, 2020, 2022
- Greek League Most Improved Player: 2006
- Greek League rebounding leader: (2006)
- 4× Greek Cup winner: 2010, 2011, 2014, 2015
- All-EuroCup Second Team: 2013
- Greek League champion: 2014
- Greek Cup MVP: 2015
- 2× Greek League Best Five: 2015, 2016
- 2× EuroCup MVP of the Round: 2015–16 (Regular Season Round 1 & 2)
- 2015–16 EuroCup Highest Index Rating in a game: 55
- 2015–16 EuroCup Most points in a game: 42
- Greek 2nd Division Champion: 2019
- Greek 2nd Division Top Scorer: (2019)
- Greek 2nd Division rebounding leader: (2019)
