= United States men's national under-21 basketball team =

Under 21 national team

United States
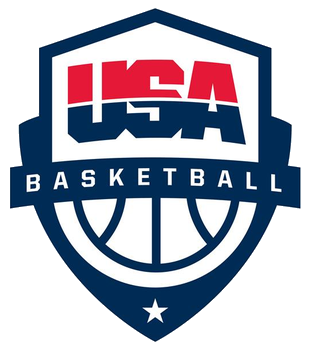
- FIBA zone: FIBA Americas
- National federation: USA Basketball

FIBA Under-21 World Championship
- Medals: Gold: 1993, 2001

FIBA Americas Under-20 Championship
- Medals: Gold: 1996, 2004; Silver: 1993, 2000
Medal record
FIBA Under-21 World Championship
Gold medal – first place	1993 Valladolid
Gold medal – first place	2001 Saitama
FIBA Americas Under-20 Championship
Gold medal – first place	1996 Caguas
Gold medal – first place	2004 Halifax
Silver medal – second place	1993 Rosario
Silver medal – second place	2000 Ribeirão Preto

The United States men's national under-20 and under-21 basketball team is a national basketball team of the United States, administered by USA Basketball. It represents the country in international under-20 and under-21 basketball competitions between 1993–2005, after the format became defunct and no longer holds for this age group.

== Competitive record ==
=== FIBA Under-21 World Championship ===
Year	Result	Position	Pld	W	L	Ref
(Spain) 1993	Champions	1st				
(Australia) 1997	Quarter-Finals	5th				
(Japan) 2001	Champions	1st	8	8	0	
(Argentina) 2005	Quarter-Finals	5th	8	7	1	
Total	2 titles	4/4				—

=== FIBA Americas Under-20 Championship ===
Year	Result	Position	Pld	W	L	Ref
(Argentina) 1993	Runners-up	2nd				
(Puerto Rico) 1996	Champions	1st	5	5	0	
(Brazil) 2000	Runners-up	2nd				
(Canada) 2004	Champions	1st	5	5	0	
Total	2 titles	4/4				—
