= Serbia men's national under-20 and under-21 basketball team =

Serbia men's national under-20 and under-21 basketball team may refer to:

- Serbia men's national under-21 basketball team
- Serbia men's national under-20 basketball team
