= USA Basketball =

Governing body for basketball in the United States

- Formation: 1974; 52 years ago
- Type: National Governing Body (NGB)
- Location: Colorado Springs, Colorado, U.S.
- Region served: United States
- Official language: English, Spanish
- Chairman: Martin Dempsey
- Key people: Jim Tooley (CEO); Chauncey Billups (Athlete representative); Kim Bohuny (NBA representative)
- Affiliations: FIBA; FIBA Americas
- Website: usab.com

USA Basketball (USAB) is a non-profit organization and the governing body for basketball in the United States. The organization represents the United States in FIBA, and the men's and women's national basketball teams in the United States Olympic & Paralympic Committee. Its chairman of the board is retired General Martin Dempsey and its CEO is Jim Tooley.

The organization was founded in 1974 as the Amateur Basketball Association of the United States of America (ABAUSA). It was then renamed USA Basketball on October 12, 1989, after FIBA modified its rules to allow NBA basketball players to compete in international competitions (professionals from Europe and South America were always allowed to compete). USA Basketball is responsible for the selection and training of the men's and women's national teams that represent the United States in international tournaments, including the FIBA Basketball World Cup for men, the FIBA Women's Basketball World Cup, the Olympic Games and the men's and women's qualifiers thereof, as well as for the promotion of the sport amongst prospective players, spectators, and fans.

== U.S. men's teams' schedule ==
	USA Basketball Men's Teams																													
Event	15	16	17	18	19	20	21	22	23	24	25	26	27	28	29	30	31	32	33	34	35	36	37	38	39	40	41	42	43	44
U16 Championship																														
U17 World Championship						^{(4)}																								
U18 Championship						^{(5)}																								
U19 World Championship																														
U20 Championship																														
U21 World Championship																														
World Championship/World Cup				^{(6)}																										
Olympics						^{(7)}																								
World University Games							^{(8)}																							
Pan American Games									^{(9)}																					
3x3						^{(10)}																								

	USA Basketball Men's Teams																													
Event	85	86	87	88	89	90	91	92	93	94	95	96	97	98	99	00	01	02	03	04	05	06	07	08	09	10	11	12	13	14
U16 Championship																														
U17 World Championship																														
U18 Championship																														
U19 World Championship																														
U20 Championship																														
U21 World Championship																														
World Championship/World Cup																														
Olympics																														
World University Games																							^{(1)}							
Pan American Games																														
3x3																														
USA Basketball Men's Teams																														
Event	55	56	57	58	59	60	61	62	63	64	65	66	67	68	69	70	71	72	73	74	75	76	77	78	79	80	81	82	83	84
U19 World Championship																														
World Championships																														
Olympics																														
World University Games																														
Pan American Games																														
USA Basketball Men's Teams
Event												36	37	38	39	40	41	42	43	44	45	46	47	48	49	50	51	52	53	54
World Championships																														
Olympics																														
Pan American Games																														

^{(1)} In 2007, the U.S. was represented by the University of Northern Iowa.
^{(2)} The U.S. was represented at the 2015 World University Games by the University of Kansas.
^{(3)} The U.S. was represented at the 2017 World University Games by Purdue University.
^{(4)} The 2020 U17 World Championship was cancelled due to the COVID-19 pandemic.
^{(5)} The 2020 U18 Americas Championship was cancelled due to the COVID-19 pandemic.
^{(6)} The 2018 FIBA Basketball World Cup was rescheduled to 2019.
^{(7)} The 2020 Olympics was postponed to 2021 due to the COVID-19 pandemic.
^{(8)} The 2021 Summer World University Games was postponed to 2023 due to the COVID-19 pandemic.
^{(9)} Qualified but decided not to participate in the 2023 Pan American Games.
^{(10)} The 2020 Olympics was postponed to 2021 due to the COVID-19 pandemic.

== U.S. women's teams' schedule ==
	21	22	23	24	25	26	27	28	29	30	31	32	33	34	35	36	37	38	39	40	41	42	43	44	45	46	47	48	49	50	51	52
U16 Championship																																
U17 World Championship																																
U18 Championship																																
U19 World Championship																																
U20 Championship																																
U21 World Championship																																
World Championships																																
Olympics																																
World University Games	^{(8)}																															
Pan American Games																																
3x3																																
U18 3x3																																
3x3 Youth Olympics		^{(9)}																														
R. William Jones Cup																																

	89	90	91	92	93	94	95	96	97	98	99	00	01	02	03	04	05	06	07	08	09	10	11	12	13	14	15	16	17	18	19	20
U16 Championship																																
U17 World Championship																																^{(5)}
U18 Championship																																^{(6)}
U19 World Championship																																
U20 Championship																																
U21 World Championship																																
World Championships																																
Olympics																																^{(7)}
World University Games															(1)				(2)										(3)		(4)	
Pan American Games																																
3x3																																
U18 3x3																																
3x3 Youth Olympics																																
R. William Jones Cup																																
USA Basketball Women's Teams																																
Event	53	54	55	56	57	59	63	64	65	66	67	68	69	70	71	72	73	74	75	76	77	78	79	80	81	82	83	84	85	86	87	88
World Championships																																
Olympics																																
World University Games																																
Pan American Games																																
R. William Jones Cup																																
U18 Championship																																
U19 World Championship																																

^{(1)} In 2003, the U.S. was represented by a Big 12 All Star team.
^{(2)} In 2007, the U.S. was represented by the University of North Carolina at Charlotte.
^{(3)} In 2017, the U.S. was represented by the University of Maryland.
^{(4)} In 2019, the U.S. was represented by Mississippi State University.
^{(5)} The 2020 U17 World Championship was cancelled due to the COVID-19 pandemic.
^{(6)} The 2020 U18U Women's AmeriCup World Championship was cancelled due to the COVID-19 pandemic.
^{(7)} The 2020 Olympics was postponed to 2021 due to the COVID-19 pandemic.
^{(8)} In 2018, the U.S. was represented by the University of Louisville.
^{(9)}The 2022 Youth Olympics was canceled due to the COVID-19 pandemic.

== See also ==
=== U.S. men ===
- United States men's national basketball team
- United States men's national under-19 basketball team
- United States men's national under-17 basketball team
- United States men's national 3x3 team

=== U.S. women ===
- United States women's national basketball team
- United States women's national under-19 basketball team
- United States women's national under-17 basketball team
- USA Women's World University Games Team
- USA Women's R. William Jones Cup Team
- USA Women's Pan American Team
- United States women's national 3x3 team

=== Other ===
- Basketball in the United States

== Logo ==
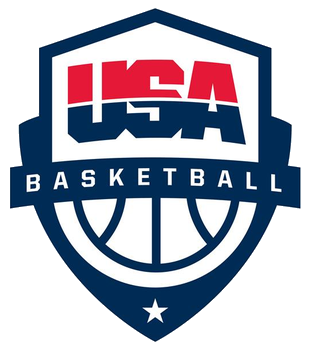
2012–present
