= Basketball Federation of Montenegro =

Governing body of basketball in Montenegro

Basketball Federation of Montenegro Košarkaški Savez Crne Gore
- Sport: Basketball
- Jurisdiction: Montenegro
- Abbreviation: KSCG
- Founded: 1955; 2006
- Affiliation: FIBA
- Regional affiliation: FIBA Europe
- Headquarters: Podgorica
- President: Jelena Dubljević
- Replaced: Basketball Federation of Serbia and Montenegro (1992–2006); Basketball Federation of Yugoslavia (1948–1992)

Official website
- www.kscg.me
- (Montenegro)

The Basketball Federation of Montenegro (Montenegrin: Košarkaški Savez Crne Gore, KSCG / Кошаркашки Савез Црне Горе, КСЦГ), is the governing body of basketball in Montenegro. It operates the top-level Opportunity League for men's clubs.

== History ==
In 2003, the federation became part of Serbia and Montenegro's basketball federation. On August 27, 2006, the Basketball Federation of Montenegro along with the Montenegro's national team joined the International Basketball Federation (FIBA) on its own after Montenegro achieved its independence from Serbia and Montenegro on June 3, 2006.

== See also ==
- Montenegro national basketball team
- Sport in Montenegro
- Želimir Cerović
