= FR Yugoslavia men's national under-21 basketball team =

Medal record

Men's basketball

Representing FR Yugoslavia

FIBA Under-21 World Championship
Bronze medal – third place	1997 Melbourne	

The Yugoslavia men's national under-21 basketball team (Serbian Cyrillic: Кошаркашка репрезентација Југославије до 21 годину) was the men's basketball team, administered by Basketball Federation of Serbia and Montenegro, that represented FR Yugoslavia (later Serbia and Montenegro) in international under-21 (under age 21) men's basketball competitions, consisted of the FIBA Under-21 World Championship (1993–2005). The event was originally referred to as the World Championship for Men '22 and Under'.

== Competitive record ==
The FIBA Under-21 World Championship was a men's under age 21 basketball competition organized by FIBA. FIBA has discontinued world championships for this age group.

Year	Pos.	GP	W	L	Ref.
(Spain) 1993	Suspended				
(Australia) 1997	Bronze medal	8	5	3	
(Japan) 2001	Did not qualify				
(Argentina) 2005	Did not qualify^{1}				
Total	1/4	8	5	3	

Notes

^{1} – Competed as Serbia and Montenegro

== The 1997 roster ==
The following is the Yugoslavia roster that won the bronze medal at the 1997 World Championship:

Yugoslavia men's national under-22 basketball team roster
Players
Coaches

Pos.	No.	Name	Age – Date of birth	Height	Club	Ctr.
SG	4	Vlado Šćepanović	21 – 13 November 1975	1.98 m (6 ft 6 in)	Budućnost	(Federal Republic of Yugoslavia)
G/F	5	Veselin Petrović	20 – 7 January 1977	1.93 m (6 ft 4 in)	FMP Železnik	(Federal Republic of Yugoslavia)
PG	6	Igor Rakočević	19 – 29 March 1978	1.97 m (6 ft 6 in)	Crvena zvezda	(Federal Republic of Yugoslavia)
F	7	Aleksandar Čubrilo	21 – 25 November 1975	2.07 m (6 ft 9 in)	Partizan	(Federal Republic of Yugoslavia)
F	8	Aleksandar Nađfeji	20 – 26 October 1976	2.02 m (6 ft 8 in)	Radnički Beograd	(Federal Republic of Yugoslavia)
C	9	Jovo Stanojević	19 – 27 September 1977	2.08 m (6 ft 10 in)	Crvena zvezda	(Federal Republic of Yugoslavia)
C	10	Dragan Basarić	21 – 17 November 1975	2.10 m (6 ft 11 in)	Borac Čačak	(Federal Republic of Yugoslavia)
C	11	Aleksandar Glintić	21 – 19 April 1976	2.08 m (6 ft 10 in)	Beovuk 72	(Federal Republic of Yugoslavia)
C	12	Đuro Ostojić	21 – 17 February 1976	2.10 m (6 ft 11 in)	Mornar	(Federal Republic of Yugoslavia)
F	13	Nenad Čanak	21 – 24 April 1976	2.04 m (6 ft 8 in)	Spartak	(Federal Republic of Yugoslavia)
PG	15	Dragan Lukovski	22 – 21 March 1975	1.89 m (6 ft 2 in)	Partizan	(Federal Republic of Yugoslavia)

Head coach

- (Federal Republic of Yugoslavia) Darko Russo

Assistant coaches

- (Federal Republic of Yugoslavia) Velimir Gašić

Legend

- Club – describes last
  club before the tournament
- Age – describes age
  on 1 August 1997

== See also ==
- Serbia men's national basketball team
- Serbia men's national under-20 basketball team
