= 2005 FIBA Under-21 World Championship =

Tournament details
- Host country: Argentina
- Dates: 5 August – 14 August
- Teams: 12
- Venue(s): 2 (in 2 host cities)

Final positions
- Champions: Lithuania (1st title)

Tournament statistics
- MVP: (Lithuania) Renaldas Seibutis
- Top scorer: (Israel) Halperin (23.5)
- Top rebounds: (Puerto Rico) Ramos (9.5)
- Top assists: (Puerto Rico) Barea (7.3)
- PPG (Team): United States (101.1)
- RPG (Team): United States (42.8)
- APG (Team): Lithuania (18.6)

The 2005 FIBA Under-21 World Championship was an international basketball competition, held from 5 to 14 August 2005, in Córdoba and Mar de Plata, Argentina. It was the last edition of the FIBA Under-21 World Championship. Twelve national teams competed in the tournament.

Lithuania won their first title, after defeating Greece in the final.

== Qualified teams ==
Iran originally qualified for the finals, but withdrew after refusing to issue a visa because the Iranian government refused to play against Israel.

Means of Qualification	Date	Venue	Berths	Qualifiers
Host Nation			1	Argentina
2004 FIBA Oceania Under-20 Championship	30 - 31 July 2004	(Australia) Terrigal	1	Australia
2004 FIBA Africa Under-20 Championship	23 July - 1 August 2004	(Senegal) Dakar	1	Nigeria
2004 FIBA Europe Under-20 Championship	23 July - 1 August 2004	(Czech Republic) Brno	4	Slovenia; Israel; Lithuania; Greece
2004 FIBA Americas Under-20 Championship	28 July - 1 August 2017	(Canada) Halifax	3	United States; Puerto Rico; Canada
2004 FIBA Asia Under-20 Championship	29 September - 8 October 2004	(Iran) Tehran	2	~~Iran~~; China
Total			12	

== Preliminary round ==
All times are local (UTC–3).

=== Group A ===
Pos	Team	Pld	W	L	PF	PA	PD	Pts	Qualification
1	Australia	5	5	0	389	332	+57	10	Quarterfinals
2	Greece	5	4	1	305	281	+24	9	Quarterfinals
3	Argentina (H)	5	3	2	312	249	+63	8	Quarterfinals
4	Canada	5	2	3	268	302	−34	7	Quarterfinals
5	Israel	5	1	4	323	333	−10	6	Placement matches
6	Iran	5	0	5	0	100	−100	5	Placement matches

Source: FIBA
Rules for classification: 1) Points; 2) Head-to-head results; 3) Points difference; 4) Points scored.
(H) Hosts

5 August 2005

Canada	20–0	Iran

Orfeo Superdomo, Córdoba

5 August 2005
18:00

Boxscore

Australia	94–81	Greece
Scoring by quarter: 24–11, 20–19, 28–27, 22–24
Pts: Newley 22; Rebs: Marić, Marković 7 Asts: Marković 7		Pts: Vasileiadis 22; Rebs: Apostolidis 6 Asts: Vasilopoulos 4

Orfeo Superdomo, Córdoba
Attendance: 1000
Referees: Luigi Lamonica (ITA), José Aníbal Carrión (PUR), José La Paix (DOM)

5 August 2005
21:00

Boxscore

Israel	58–71	Argentina
Scoring by quarter: 15–11, 9–22, 16–23, 18–15
Pts: Eliyahu 15; Rebs: Eliyahu 7 Asts: Limonad 4		Pts: Sandes 19; Rebs: Sandes 10; Asts: Figueroa 4

Orfeo Superdomo, Córdoba
Attendance: 4500
Referees: Terry Moore (USA), Virginijus Dovidavicius (LTU), Sasha Pukl (SLO)

6 August 2005

Israel	20–0	Iran

Orfeo Superdomo, Córdoba

6 August 2005
18:15

Boxscore

Canada	71–88	Australia
Scoring by quarter: 13–26, 22–19, 22–23, 14–20
Pts: Kuljanin 18; Rebs: Kendall 8 Asts: Altidor-Cespedes 4		Pts: Bruce 18; Rebs: Marić 11; Asts: Bruce 4

Orfeo Superdomo, Córdoba
Attendance: 2000
Referees: Luigi Lamonica (ITA), Sergio Pacheco (BRA), Qi Ban (CHN)

6 August 2005
21:00

Boxscore

Argentina	59–63	Greece
Scoring by quarter: 14–7, 16–20, 14–15, 15–21
Pts: Schattmann 17; Rebs: Mainoldi 11; Asts: Sandes 4		Pts: Vasileiadis 20; Rebs: Mavrokefalidis 7 Asts: Xanthopoulos 4

Orfeo Superdomo, Córdoba
Attendance: 4600
Referees: Terry Moore (USA), José Aníbal Carrión (PUR), Eddie Viator (FRA)

7 August 2005

Iran	0–20	Australia

Orfeo Superdomo, Córdoba

7 August 2005
19:30

Boxscore

Greece	79–75	Israel
Scoring by quarter: 18–15, 19–18, 24–23, 14–19
Pts: Vasilopoulos 24; Rebs: Zefkilis 10; Asts: Three players 3		Pts: Halperin 22; Rebs: Nir 9 Asts: Limonad 5

Orfeo Superdomo, Córdoba
Attendance: 3000
Referees: Sergio Pacheco (BRA), Sasha Pukl (SLO), Qi Ban (CHN)

7 August 2005
21:50

Boxscore

Argentina	86–46	Canada
Scoring by quarter: 17–12, 18–12, 20–10, 31–12
Pts: Schattmann 19; Rebs: Weigand 9 Asts: Four players 2		Pts: Kuljanin 10; Rebs: Kendall, Kuljanin 5 Asts: Kendall 2

Orfeo Superdomo, Córdoba
Attendance: 5000
Referees: Virginijus Dovidavicius (LTU), José La Paix (DOM), Eddie Viator (FRA)

9 August 2005

Iran	0–20	Argentina

Orfeo Superdomo, Córdoba

9 August 2005
18:15

Boxscore

Australia	105–104	Israel
Scoring by quarter: 24–27, 28–34, 32–22, 21–21
Pts: Newley 22; Rebs: Marić 12; Asts: Marković 4		Pts: Halperin 27; Rebs: Eliyahu 9 Asts: Halperin 6

Orfeo Superdomo, Córdoba
Referees: Virginijus Dovidavicius (LTU), Luigi Lamonica (ITA), Qi Ban (CHN)

9 August 2005
20:30

Boxscore

Greece	62–53	Canada
Scoring by quarter: 10–13, 15–8, 17–19, 20–13
Pts: Vasileiadis 23; Rebs: Vasilopoulos 7 Asts: Xanthopoulos 6		Pts: Kou 17; Rebs: Kendall, Kuljanin 6 Asts: Constain, Doornekamp 3

Orfeo Superdomo, Córdoba
Referees: Terry Moore (USA), Sasha Pukl (SLO), José La Paix (DOM)

10 August 2005

Greece	20–0	Iran

Orfeo Superdomo, Córdoba

10 August 2005
18:15

Boxscore

Israel	66–78	Canada
Scoring by quarter: 26–17, 18–15, 16–28, 6–18
Pts: Halperin 22; Rebs: Eliyahu 8 Asts: Halperin 4		Pts: Gallimore 24; Rebs: Three players 6 Asts: Gallimore, Kendall 3

Orfeo Superdomo, Córdoba
Referees: Terry Moore (USA), Luigi Lamonica (ITA), Eddie Viator (FRA)

10 August 2005
20:30

Boxscore

Argentina	76–82	Australia
Scoring by quarter: 10–22, 19–29, 26–18, 21–13
Pts: Sandes 23; Rebs: Alloatti 9 Asts: Schattmann 3		Pts: Marković 20; Rebs: Marić 10; Asts: Marić 5

Orfeo Superdomo, Córdoba
Referees: Sasa Pukl (SLO), José Aníbal Carrión (PUR), Sergio Pacheco (BRA)

=== Group B ===
Pos	Team	Pld	W	L	PF	PA	PD	Pts	Qualification
1	United States	5	5	0	509	369	+140	10	Quarterfinals
2	Lithuania	5	4	1	478	408	+70	9	Quarterfinals
3	Puerto Rico	5	3	2	422	378	+44	8	Quarterfinals
4	Slovenia	5	2	3	332	362	−30	7	Quarterfinals
5	Nigeria	5	1	4	366	457	−91	6	Placement matches
6	China	5	0	5	334	467	−133	5	Placement matches

Source: FIBA
Rules for classification: 1) Points; 2) Head-to-head results; 3) Points difference; 4) Points scored.

5 August 2005

Boxscore

Slovenia	63–54	Nigeria

5 August 2005

Boxscore

China	50–117	United States

5 August 2005

Boxscore

Lithuania	97–81	Puerto Rico

6 August 2005

Boxscore

Nigeria	87–81	China

6 August 2005

Boxscore

United States	103–83	Lithuania

6 August 2005

Boxscore

Puerto Rico	71–50	Slovenia

7 August 2005

Boxscore

Lithuania	110–75	Nigeria

7 August 2005

Boxscore

China	63–66	Slovenia

7 August 2005

Boxscore

United States	94–79	Puerto Rico

9 August 2005

Boxscore

Slovenia	74–92	Lithuania

9 August 2005

Boxscore

Nigeria	78–113	United States

9 August 2005

Boxscore

Puerto Rico	101–65	China

10 August 2005

Boxscore

United States	82–79	Slovenia

10 August 2005

Boxscore

Lithuania	96–75	China

10 August 2005

Boxscore

Nigeria	72–90	Puerto Rico

== 9th–12th place playoffs ==
9th–12th place semifinals
B5	Nigeria	w/o
A6	Iran
A5	Israel	95
B6	China	74

9th place match
B5	Nigeria	110
A5	Israel	104
11th place match
A6	Iran
B6	China	w/o

=== 9th–12th place semifinals ===
12 August 2005

Nigeria	w/o–	Iran

12 August 2005

Boxscore

Israel	95–74	China

=== 11th place match ===
13 August 2005

Iran	–w/o	China

=== 9th place match ===
13 August 2005

Boxscore

Nigeria	110–104	Israel

== Championship playoffs ==
Fifth place
A3	Argentina	85
B1	United States	111
Seventh place
B4	Slovenia	77
B3	Puerto Rico	86

Consolation semifinals
A3	Argentina	70
B4	Slovenia	43
B3	Puerto Rico	79
B1	United States	99

Quarterfinals
B2	Lithuania	76
A3	Argentina	63
A1	Australia	89
B4	Slovenia	80
A2	Greece	88
B3	Puerto Rico	63
B1	United States	90
A4	Canada	93

Semifinals
B2	Lithuania	96
A1	Australia	73
A2	Greece	74
A4	Canada	61

Final
B2	Lithuania	65
A2	Greece	63
Third place
A1	Australia	74
A4	Canada	79

=== Quarterfinals ===
12 August 2005

Boxscore

Lithuania	76–63	Argentina

12 August 2005

Boxscore

Australia	89–80	Slovenia

12 August 2005

Boxscore

Greece	88–63	Puerto Rico

12 August 2005

Boxscore

United States	90–93	Canada

=== 5th–8th place semifinals ===
13 August 2005

Boxscore

Argentina	70–43	Slovenia

13 August 2005

Boxscore

Puerto Rico	79–99	United States

=== Semifinals ===
13 August 2005

Boxscore

Lithuania	96–73	Australia

13 August 2005

Boxscore

Greece	74–61	Canada

=== 7th place match ===
14 August 2005

Boxscore

Slovenia	77–86	Puerto Rico

=== 5th place match ===
14 August 2005

Boxscore

Argentina	85–111	United States

=== 3rd place match ===
14 August 2005

Boxscore

Australia	74–79	Canada

=== Final ===
14 August 2005

Boxscore

Lithuania	65–63	Greece

== Final standings ==
Rank	Team
1st place, gold medalist(s)	Lithuania
2nd place, silver medalist(s)	Greece
3rd place, bronze medalist(s)	Canada
4	Australia
5	United States
6	Argentina
7	Puerto Rico
8	Slovenia
9	Nigeria
10	Israel
11	China
12	Iran
