= Mauritania men's national under-20 basketball team =

Mauritania
- FIBA zone: FIBA Africa
- National federation: Fédération de Basketball de la République Islamique de Mauritanie

U21 World Championship
- Appearances: None

U20 Africa Championship
- Appearances: 1 (2004)
- Medals: None

The Mauritania men's national under-20 basketball team is a national basketball team of Mauritania, administered by the Fédération de Basketball de la République Islamique de Mauritanie. It represents the country in international under-20 basketball competitions.

The only participation of Mauritania at the FIBA Africa Under-20 Championship was in 2004, when they finished in eighth place.

== See also ==
- Mauritania men's national basketball team
