= Vladimir Kuljanin =

Canadian basketball player

Medal record

Men's basketball

Representing Canada

FIBA U21 World Championship
Bronze medal – third place	2005 Mar del Plata	National team

Vladimir "Vlad" Kuljanin (born April 2, 1985) is a Canadian former professional basketball player.

Kuljanin was seventh place with the Canadian national men's basketball team at the 2007 Pan American Games in Rio de Janeiro. He moved to Toronto from his birth city of Sarajevo at the age of ten. Kuljanin played in the 2005 FIBA U21 World Championship, where Canada won the bronze medal.
