= Želimir Cerović =

Montenegrin basketball player and executive (1948–2019)

President of the Basketball Federation of Yugoslavia (KSJ)
- In office 1999–2003
- Preceded by: Dragoslav Ražnatović
- Succeeded by: Miodrag Babić

Personal details
- Born: 12 March 1948 Nikšić, PR Montenegro, FPR Yugoslavia
- Died: 10 December 2019 (aged 71) Nikšić, Montenegro

Želimir "Željko" Cerović (14 March 1948 – 10 December 2019) was a Montenegrin basketball executive and basketball player. He was the president of the Basketball Federation of FR Yugoslavia.

== Basketball career ==
Cerović spent the entire playing career with his hometown team Sutjeska.

Cerović was a board member of Budućnost Podgorica from 1984 to 1990. In 1989, he was elected as the president of the Basketball Association of Montenegro, a regional association within Basketball Federation of Yugoslavia. He left the federation in 1998.

Cerović served as the president of the Basketball Federation of FR Yugoslavia from 1999 to 2003. During his tenure, the FR Yugoslavia senior national team won gold medals at the 2001 EuroBasket and the 2002 FIBA World Championship.

Cerović was a member of the Presidency of the Basketball Federation of Montenegro until January 2019.
