= Basketball Federation of Serbia and Montenegro =

Non-profit national sports governing body

Basketball Federation of Serbia and Montenegro Basketball Federation of Yugoslavia
- Sport: Basketball
- Jurisdiction: FR Yugoslavia (1992–2003); Serbia and Montenegro (2003–2006)
- Abbreviation: KSSCG; KSJ
- Founded: 1992
- Affiliation: FIBA
- Affiliation date: 1992
- Regional affiliation: FIBA Europe
- Headquarters: Belgrade
- Closure date: 2006
- (Serbia and Montenegro)

The Basketball Federation of Serbia and Montenegro (Serbian: Košarkaški savez Srbije i Crne Gore / Кошаркашки савез Србије и Црне Горе;), previously Basketball Federation of Yugoslavia, was a non-profit organization and the national sports governing body for basketball in Serbia and Montenegro. Federal Republic of Yugoslavia renamed to Serbia and Montenegro in 2003. Until 2006, the organization has represented Serbia and Montenegro in FIBA and the men's and women's national basketball teams in the Olympic Committee of Serbia and Montenegro.

After the dissolution of Serbia and Montenegro in 2006, the successor countries all set up their national federations.

== History ==
Following the breakup of Yugoslavia, Basketball Federation of Yugoslavia was disbanded and five new federations (of former Yugoslavia states) were established in 1991 and 1992. In 1992, the Basketball Federation of FR Yugoslavia was established and became the governing body in FR Yugoslavia.

From 1992 to 2003, the national team played under name of FR Yugoslavia and from 2003 to 2006 under name of Serbia and Montenegro in international competitions. Following the Montenegrin declaration of independence in 2006, the Basketball Federation of Montenegro was established and joined FIBA, while Basketball Federation of Serbia retained the place of Basketball Federation of Serbia and Montenegro as a FIBA member.

Also, the Basketball Federation of Kosovo, the governing body in disputed territory of Kosovo, joined FIBA on 13 March 2015 following the adoption of Brussels Agreement.

== Competitions ==
Men's

- Regional league: Adriatic League
- 1st-tier league: First League
- 2nd-tier league: First B League
- Cup tournament: Yugoslav Cup (1992–2002) & Radivoj Korać Cup (2002–2006)
  - 2nd-tier cup tournament: Serbian Cup

Women's

- Regional league: Adriatic League
- 1st-tier league: First League
- Cup tournament: Serbia and Montenegro Women's Basketball Cup

== National teams ==
Men's

- Men's national team
- Men's national under-21 team
- Men's national under-20 team
- Men's national under-19 team
- Men's national under-18 team
- Men's national under-16 team
- Men's university team

Women's

- Women's national team
- Women's national under-20 team
- Women's national under-19 team
- Women's national under-18 team
- Women's national under-16 team
- Women's university team

== New national federations ==
In 2006, Montenegro became an independent nation and Serbia became the legal successor of Serbia and Montenegro. In 2008, Kosovo declared independence from Serbia and became a FIBA member in 2015.

| Country | Association | Founded |
|---|---|---|
| Montenegro | Basketball Federation of Montenegro | 2006 |
| Serbia | Basketball Federation of Serbia | 2006 |
| Kosovo | Basketball Federation of Kosovo | 2008 (Note: FIBA Affiliated in 2015) |

== List of presidents ==
FR Yugoslavia

- Veselin Barović (1991–1995)
- Nebojša Čović (1995–1997)
- Dragoslav Ražnatović (1997–1999)
- Želimir Cerović (1999–2003)

Serbia and Montenegro

- Miodrag Babić (2003–2005)
- Goran Knežević (2005–2006)

== See also ==
- Basketball Federation of Yugoslavia
