= Orfeo Superdomo =

Indoor sports arena located in Córdoba, Argentina

Orfeo Superdome
- Orfeo Superdomo
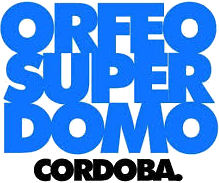

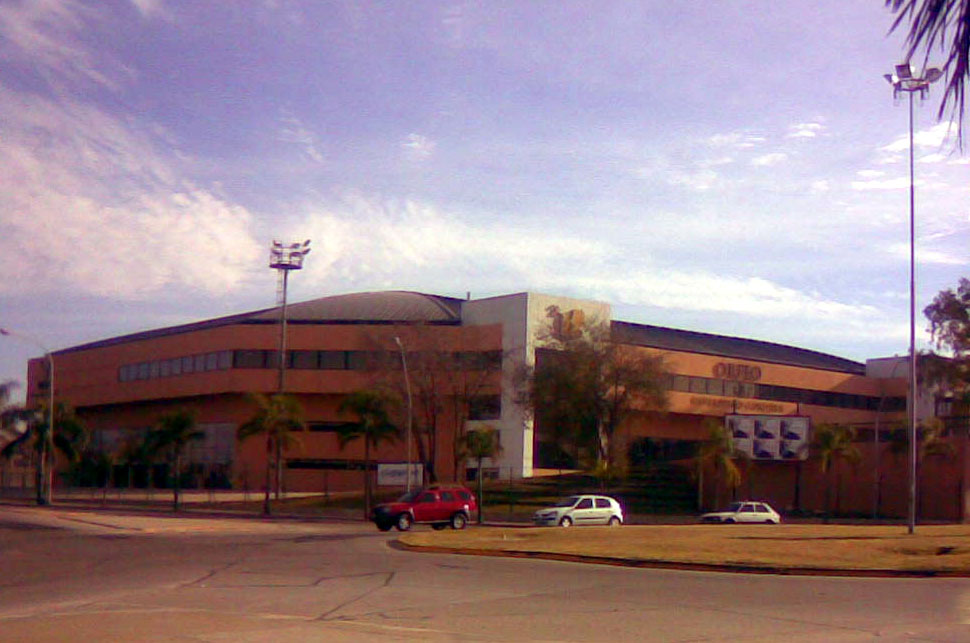
- The arena in 2007
- Interactive map of Orfeo Superdome
- Location: Av. Cardeñosa 3450. B° Alto Verde Córdoba, Argentina
- Coordinates: 31°21′54″S 64°13′17″W
- Owner: Grupo Dinosaurio S.A.
- Capacity: 14,000 (sports); 8,000–12,000 (concerts)
- Type: Arena
- Surface: Parquet
- Field size: 23,000 m2 16,730 m2 (covered)

Construction
- Opened: September 2002
- Closed: 2020
- Architects: Francisco Antonio; Juan Rodolfo Pérez

Tenant
- Atenas (basketball)

The Orfeo Superdomo was an indoor arena located in the city of Córdoba in the homonymous province of Argentina. The arena was primarily used to host sporting events such as basketball, volleyball, boxing, and tennis matches. It was also the host venue for most concerts in Córdoba. The seating capacity of the arena is 14,000 people for sports, and 8,000 to 12,000 people for concerts.

The arena is owned and operated by "Grupo Dinosaurio S.A.", a local corporate group that also owns and manages companies in the retail, hotel, entertainment, and media areas. It remains inactive since its closure in 2020 after the COVID-19 pandemic.

== History ==
Orfeo Superdome's opening was on 6 September 2002, with a concert by rock band Divididos to promote their album Vengo del placard de otro. On 24 January 2010, the arena hosted a concert by Metallica, which sold out within a few hours of being announced. Guns And Roses was another international band to perform at Superdomo in October 2011, followed by Deep Purple six days later.

Due to financial problems that became critical during the COVID-19 pandemic in Argentina, the group decided to close the venue in 2020. Few days after its closure, the Córdoba City Council declared Orfeo Superdomo a place of local interest which spared the venue from being demolished. In 2021, the venue was used as vaccination center during the Covid pandemic. After that, the Orfeo was closed and has remained in such condition since then.

In August 2024, it was announced that the building would be refurbished to become a medical center. Apart from the health care facilities, the building will also include several shops. The Argüello–Pitt was the architectural firm chosen, and it is estimated the complex will be operative in 2027.

== Sporting events ==
Orfeo was one of the host venues of the 2002 FIVB Volleyball Men's World Championship, and it also hosted the final round of the 2010 FIVB Volleyball World League. It also hosted the final stage of the 2017 FIBA AmeriCup. The arena has also been used to host some basketball games of local club Atenas.

== Concerts hosted ==
The following is a list of artist that performed at the Orfeo Superdome until its closure in 2020:

- Above & Beyond 2014
- Alan Parsons 2011
- Alejandro Lerner 2010
- Alejandro Sanz 2007, 2010
- Arctic Monkeys 2014
- Armin Van Buuren 2009
- Axel (cantante) 2009
- Babasonicos 2011
- Black Sabbath 2016
- Bob Dylan 2008
- Bryan Adams 2007
- Calle 13 2011
- Callejeros 2007, 2010
- Charly García 2010, 2011
- Chayanne 2011
- Cristian Castro 2015
- Cyndi Lauper 2008
- Daddy Yankee 2010
- Daniela Mercury 2011
- David Bisbal 2010, 2011
- Deep Purple 2011
- Divididos 2004, 2010, 2011
- Don Omar 2008
- Franco De Vita 2011
- Guns N' Roses 2011
- Gustavo Cerati 2009
- Ha*Ash 2016
- Hernan Cattaneo 2007, 2014
- Joaquín Sabina 2010
- José Luis Perales 2016
- Juanes 2012
- Julieta Venegas 2008, 2011
- Julio Iglesias 2016
- La Ley 2008
- La Oreja de Van Gogh 2004, 2007, 2009
- León Gieco 2004
- Les Luthiers 2011
- Liza Minnelli 2009
- Luciano Pereyra 2018
- Luis Alberto Spinetta 2010
- Luis Fonsi 2011
- Luis Miguel November 16 and 17, 2005 (Mexico En La Piel Tour), November 9 and 10, 2010 (Luis Miguel Tour)
- Maluma 2016, 2017
- Marc Anthony 2012
- Marco Antonio Solis 2012
- Megadeth Countdown To Extinction 20th Anniversary Tour 2012
- Metallica 2010
- Michael Bolton 2008
- Michael Bublé 2012
- Miranda! 2006
- Morrissey 2012
- Muse 2015
- Nick Jonas & The Administration 2011
- Noel Gallagher's High Flying Birds 2012
- Paul Oakenfold 2010
- Paulina Rubio 2007
- Paulo Londra 2019
- Peter Cetera 2010
- Pimpinela 2018
- Queen 2015 featuring Adam Lambert
- RBD 2009
- Ricardo Arjona 2006
- Ricky Martin February 28, 2007 (Black and White Tour), and September 5, 06, 2011 (Música + Alma + Sexo World Tour)
- Ringo Starr 2013
- Robert Plant 2012
- Romeo Santos 2014
- Rosana 2006
- Roxette 2011, 2012
- Satoshi Tomiie 2010
- Sebastian Yatra 2019
- Selena Gomez & The Scene 2012
- Slash 2011
- Slash featuring Myles Kennedy and The Conspirators 2012
- Soy Luna 2017, 2018
- Stone Temple Pilots 2010
- Teen Angels 2008, 2009, 2010, 2011 and 2012
- The Hives 2014
- Tom Jones 2010
- Toto 2007
- UB40 2006
- Violetta 2013, 2015
- Wisin y Yandel 2010
- Zucchero 2012

== Post-closure ==
The lack of concerts in Córdoba caused by the Orfeo Superdome's closure, encouraged some Cordobese entrepreneurs to project the opening of new venues to host music concerts in the city. Infinito Open, a local firm, announced that would build an arena near the Córdoba–Rosario highway while the Provincial Government also showed its intentions to open an arena near Estadio Mario Alberto Kempes. It its intended to have a capacity for 12,500 people, with a cost of construction of USD30 million. The government also stated that the former venue building could serve as seat for a medical center.
