= Greece men's national under-21 basketball team =

Greece
- Joined FIBA: 1932
- FIBA zone: FIBA Europe
- National federation: Hellenic Basketball Federation

FIBA Under-21 World Cup
- Appearances: 2
- Medals: Silver: 1 (2005)
Home	Away

The Greece men's national under-21 basketball team (Greek: Εθνική ομάδα καλαθοσφαίρισης Νέων Ανδρών Ελλάδας) (Greek Young Men National Basketball Team), represents Greece in international under-21 basketball competitions, and it is organized and run by the Hellenic Basketball Federation (EOK). The Greece men's national under-21 basketball team played at the FIBA Under-21 World Cup.

== FIBA Under-21 World Cup participations ==
Year	Position
(Spain) 1993	5th
(Australia) 1997	Did not qualify
(Japan) 2001	Did not qualify
(Argentina) 2005	2nd place, silver medalist(s)
Total	2/4
