= FIBA Americas Under-20 Championship =

Basketball championship

- Formerly: FIBA Americas Under-22 Championship; FIBA Americas Under-21 Championship
- Sport: Basketball
- Founded: 1993
- Founder: FIBA Americas
- First season: 1993
- Folded: 2004
- No. of teams: 8
- Continent: Americas
- Last champions: United States (2nd title)
- Most titles: United States; Argentina (2 titles)
- Related competitions: FIBA Under-21 World Championship

The FIBA Americas Under-20 Championship was the American basketball championships for players under 20 years that took place every four years among national teams of the continents. The winners qualified for the now-defunct FIBA Under-21 World Championship. This event had been the FIBA Americas Under-21 Championship, but FIBA decided to lower the age limit for the FIBA 22 & Under World Championship in December 1998, and was renamed as the World Championship for Young Men. In 2004, the name was changed again to FIBA Under-21 World Championship, and the qualifying tournament was renamed to the present FIBA Americas Under-20 Championship.

== Results ==
Year	Location	Gold	Silver	Bronze	4th Place
1993	(Argentina) Rosario	Argentina	United States	Brazil	Canada
1996	(Puerto Rico) Caguas	United States	Puerto Rico	Argentina	Canada
2000	(Brazil) Ribeirão Preto	Argentina	United States	Dominican Republic	Brazil
2004	(Canada) Halifax	United States	Puerto Rico	Argentina	Canada

== Participation Details ==
Team	(Argentina); 1993	(Puerto Rico); 1996	(Brazil); 2000	(Canada); 2004	Total
Argentina	1st	3rd	1st	3rd	4
Bahamas	-	-	-	7th	1
Brazil	3rd	5th	4th	6th	4
Canada	4th	4th	5th	4th	4
Cuba	5th	-	-	-	1
Dominican Republic	-	-	3rd	8th	2
Mexico	5th	8th	-	-	2
Panama	5th	6th	6th	-	3
Puerto Rico	-	2nd	7th	2nd	3
United States	2nd	1st	2nd	1st	4
Uruguay	5th	7th	8th	-	3
Venezuela	-	-	-	5th	1

== Medal table ==
Rank	Nation	Gold	Silver	Bronze	Total
1	United States	2	2	0	4
2	Argentina	2	0	2	4
3	Puerto Rico	0	2	0	2
4	Brazil	0	0	1	1
4	Dominican Republic	0	0	1	1
Totals (5 entries)		4	4	4	12
