= 2004 FIBA Africa Under-20 Championship =

2004 FIBA Africa U-20 Championship
4th FIBA Africa Under-20 Championship

Tournament details
- Host country: Senegal
- Dates: 23 July – 1 August 2004
- Teams: 10 (from 1 confederation)
- Venue: 1 (in 1 host city)

Final positions
- Champions: Nigeria (1st title)

Tournament statistics
- Top scorer: (Angola) Mílton Barros 23.5

Official website
- www.fiba.basketball/history

The 2004 FIBA Africa Under-20 Championship was the fourth and final FIBA Africa Under-20 Championship, played under the rules of FIBA, the world governing body for basketball, and its FIBA Africa branch. Senegal hosted the tournament from 23 July to 1 August 2004.

Nigeria defeated Cameroon 83–82 in the final to win the championship and secure a spot at the 2005 U-21 World Cup.

== Draw ==
Group A	Group B	Group C	Group D
Morocco; Senegal	Mauritania; Tunisia	Algeria; Cameroon; DR Congo	Angola; Mali; Nigeria

== Preliminary round ==
July 23

Senegal	56–46	Morocco

July 24

Tunisia	70–60	Mauritania

July 24

Algeria	20–0	(Democratic Republic of the Congo) DR Congo

July 25

Algeria	60–77	Cameroon

July 26

DR Congo (Democratic Republic of the Congo)	64–67	Cameroon

July 24

Angola	79–73	Mali

July 25

Angola	60–68	Nigeria

July 26

Mali	81–89	Nigeria

== Knockout stage ==
Championship bracket

Quarter-finals
Wed 28 Jul 2004
Nigeria	84
Mauritania	49
Wed 28 Jul 2004
Angola	89
Tunisia	79
Wed 28 Jul 2004
Cameroon	60
Morocco	57
Wed 28 Jul 2004
Senegal	58
Algeria	48

Semi-finals
Thu 29 Jul 2004
Nigeria	71
Angola	51
Thu 29 Jul 2004
Cameroon	83
Senegal	81

Final
Fri 30 Jul 2004
Nigeria	83
Cameroon	82
Third place match
Fri 30 Jul 2004
Angola	62
Senegal	58

5th–8th place bracket

5th–8th place semifinals
Wed 28 Jul 2004
Tunisia	59
Mauritania	52
Wed 28 Jul 2004
Morocco	61
Algeria	56

Fifth place match
Fri 30 Jul 2004
Tunisia	61
Morocco	58
Seventh place match
Fri 30 Jul 2004
Algeria	69
Mauritania	68

=== Quarter-finals ===
July 28

Tunisia	79–89	Angola

July 28

Cameroon	60–57	Morocco

July 28

Senegal	58–48	Algeria

July 28

Nigeria	84–49	Mauritania

=== 5th–8th place semifinals ===
July 29

Tunisia	59–52	Mauritania

July 29

Morocco	61–56	Algeria

=== Semifinals ===
July 29

Cameroon	83–81	Senegal

July 29

Angola	51–71	Nigeria

=== 9th place match ===
July 30

DR Congo	77–80	Mali

=== 7th place match ===
July 30

Algeria	69–68	Mauritania

=== 5th place match ===
July 30

Tunisia	61–58	Morocco

=== 3rd place match ===
July 30

Angola	62–58	Senegal

=== Final ===
July 30

Cameroon	82–83	Nigeria

== Final standings ==
Qualified for the 2005 U-21 World Cup

Rank	Team	Record
1st place, gold medalist(s)	Nigeria	5–0
2nd place, silver medalist(s)	Cameroon	4–1
3rd place, bronze medalist(s)	Angola	3–2
4	Senegal	2–2
5	Tunisia	3–1
6	Morocco	1–3
7	Algeria	2–3
8	Mauritania	0–4
9	Mali	1–2
10	DR Congo	0–3

== Awards ==
2004 FIBA Africa U20 Championship winners

Nigeria
1st title
