= Kostas Vasileiadis =

Greek basketball player (born 1984)

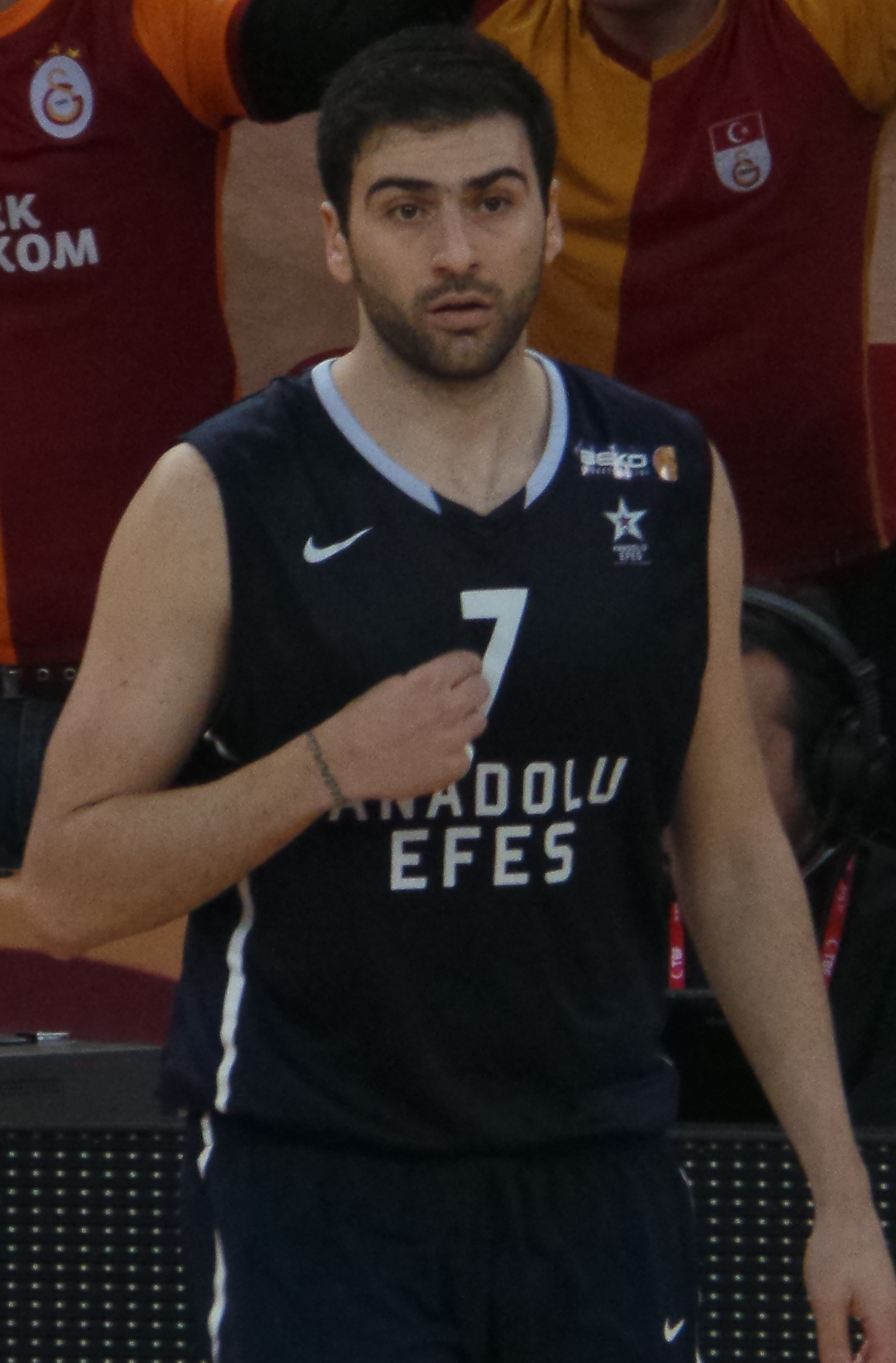
- Vasileiadis, in action with Anadolu Efes, in 2014.

Personal information
- Born: March 15, 1984 (age 42) Thessaloniki, Greece
- Listed height: 6 ft 7 in (2.01 m)
- Listed weight: 225 lb (102 kg)

Career information
- NBA draft: 2006: undrafted
- Playing career: 2000–2024
- Position: Shooting guard / Small forward

Career history
- 2000–2006: PAOK
- 2006–2007: Málaga
- 2007–2008: Olympiacos
- 2008–2009: PAOK
- 2009: Sutor Montegranaro
- 2009–2010: Obradoiro
- 2010–2013: Bilbao
- 2013–2014: Anadolu Efes
- 2014–2015: Málaga
- 2015–2016: PAOK
- 2016: Obradoiro
- 2016–2017: AEK Athens
- 2017: Aries Trikala
- 2017–2018: Canarias
- 2018–2020: Obradoiro
- 2020–2021: Al Sadd
- 2021–2022: Murcia
- 2022: Marinos de Anzoátegui
- 2022–2023: Atlético Goes
- 2023–2024: Cáceres Ciudad del Baloncesto

Career highlights
- All-EuroCup First Team (2013); Spanish League champion (2006); Greek Youth All-Star Game MVP (2004)
Medals
Men's basketball
Representing Greece
FIBA U21 World Cup
Silver medal – second place	2005 Argentina	Under-21
FIBA U19 World Cup
Bronze medal – third place	2003 Greece	Under-19
FIBA Europe U18 Championship
Bronze medal – third place	2002 Germany	Under-18

Konstantinos "Kostas" Vasileiadis (alternate spellings include: Costas, Vasiliadis, Vassiliadis) (Greek: Κωνσταντίνος "Κώστας" Βασιλειάδης; born March 15, 1984) is a Greek former professional basketball player who last played for Cáceres Ciudad del Baloncesto of LEB Oro. He is a 2.01 m (6 ft 7 in) tall swingman.

== Professional career ==
Vasileiadis was born in Thessaloniki, Greece, (origin from Elevtherochori, Kilkis) and raised in Kilkis, Greece. He started his professional career with PAOK of the Greek Basket League. He was the team captain of PAOK, and he played there for 6 years before joining Málaga of the Spanish League.

During the 2006–07 season, Málaga was able to make an impact in European competitions, including qualifying for the Euroleague Final Four.

On July 12, 2007, he signed a contract with the Greek EuroLeague giants Olympiacos, despite them being rivals to PAOK, his previous team and the club he supports. He helped Olympiacos to a second-place finish in the Greek League during the 2007–08 season. Vasileiadis returned to PAOK for the 2008–09 season, as part of the club's revitalization movement under new ownership, after a disappointing 2007–08 season for the club. He was once again made the team's captain.

Before the 2008–09 season was over, he moved the Italian League club Sutor Basket Montegranaro. He signed a contract with the Spanish ACB League team Obradoiro CAB in August 2009. In 2010, he signed a 3-year contract with the Spanish club Bilbao Basket, with the third year being optional. He was named to the All-EuroCup First Team in 2013.

On July 19, 2013, Vasileiadis signed a contract with the Turkish League team Anadolu Efes.

On August 27, 2014, he signed a two-year deal with Unicaja Málaga. He left Málaga after one season.

In 2015, Vasileiadis returned home to again play for PAOK. With PAOK, Vasileiadis played through the Greek League's playoff quarterfinals against AEK Athens, where PAOK lost the series 2 games to 1. During the season, he averaged 14.7 points, 5.3 rebounds, and 2.1 assists per game in the Greek League, and 13.4 points and 4.8 rebounds per game in the EuroCup. At the end of the season, he rejoined Obradoiro, and played there until the end of the Spanish League season.

On June 17, 2016, he signed a two-year deal with AEK Athens. On July 24, 2017, he parted ways with AEK.

On October 10, 2017, he joined Aries Trikala of the Greek Basket League. On December 5, 2017, he left Trikala and signed with Iberostar Tenerife for the rest of the 2017–18 ACB season.

On July 15, 2018, he signed a two-year deal with Monbus Obradoiro of the Liga ACB. On July 16, 2020, Vasileiadis and Obradoiro parted ways and his third stint with the Spanish club officially ended.

On April 9, 2021, he has signed with UCAM Murcia of the Spanish Liga ACB.

== Career statistics ==
Legend
GP	Games played	GS	Games started	MPG	Minutes per game
FG%	Field-goal percentage	3P%	3-point field-goal percentage	FT%	Free-throw percentage
RPG	Rebounds per game	APG	Assists per game	SPG	Steals per game
BPG	Blocks per game	PPG	Points per game	PIR	Performance index rating
**Bold**	Career high

=== EuroLeague ===
*	Led the league

Year	Team	GP	GS	MPG	FG%	3P%	FT%	RPG	APG	SPG	BPG	PPG	PIR
2000–01	PAOK	2	0	.1	—	—	—	.5	—	—	—	0.0	0.5
2006–07	Málaga	21	2	14.1	.375	.333	.744	2.3	.3	.4	.0	6.3	5.4
2007–08	Olympiacos	17	0	12.3	**.491**	**.436**	**1.000**	1.4	.8	.5	**.1**	4.5	4.6
2011–12	Bilbao	20	9	22.8	.416	.376	.877	2.1	.8	**.8**	**.1**	**10.8**	**9.2**
2013–14	Anadolu Efes	**23**	**15**	**27.2**	.415	.403	.902	**2.7**	**1.4**	**.8**	**.1**	**10.8**	9.1
2014–15	Málaga	17	**15**	14.9	.336	.297	.944*	1.2	.7	.5	**.1**	6.5	2.7
Career		100	41	18.4	.401	.370	.862	2.0	.8	.6	.1	7.9	6.3

=== Basketball Champions League ===
Year	Team	GP	MPG	FG%	3P%	FT%	RPG	APG	SPG	BPG	PPG
2016–17	A.E.K.	**11**	**22.6**	.373	.353	**1.000**	2.3	.9	.7	0	7.5
2017–18	Tenerife	8	15.5	**.391**	**.366**	.917	**2.4**	**1.1**	**.9**	0	**7.8**

== National team career ==
At the national team level, Vasileiadis played as a youth with the junior men's Greek national teams. They won the bronze medal at both the 2002 FIBA Europe Under-18 Championship and the 2003 FIBA Under-19 World Cup, where he was also named to the All-Tournament Team. He was named to the 2004 FIBA Europe Under-20 Championship All-Tournament Team, which he also led in scoring.

The silver medal was also won and he was voted to the All-Tournament Team, at the 2005 FIBA Under-21 World Cup, which was held in Argentina. He was also a member of the Greece men's national basketball team. With Greece's senior national team, he played at the 2011 EuroBasket and at the 2014 FIBA World Cup. He also played at the 2012 FIBA World Olympic Qualifying Tournament.

== Awards and accomplishments ==
=== Pro career ===
- Greek Youth All-Star Game MVP: (2004)
- 3× Greek League All-Star: (2005, 2006, 2008)
- Spanish League Champion: (2006)
- All-EuroCup First Team: (2013)

=== Greek junior national team ===
- 2002 FIBA Europe Under-18 Championship: Bronze
- 2003 FIBA Under-19 World Cup: Bronze
- 2003 FIBA Under-19 World Cup: All-Tournament Team
- 2004 FIBA Europe Under-20 Championship: Top Scorer
- 2004 FIBA Europe Under-20 Championship: All-Tournament Team
- 2005 FIBA Under-21 World Cup: Silver
- 2005 FIBA Under-21 World Cup: All-Tournament Team

== See also ==
- List of youngest EuroLeague players
