= Lithuania men's national canoe polo team =

Lithuania men's national canoe polo team is a national team representing Lithuania.

== Tournament records ==
=== World championships ===
- 1994-2012 – Did not compete

=== European championships ===
- 1997 (Germany) - 10th
- 1999 (Belgium) - 13th
- 2001 (Poland) - 12th
- 2013 (Poland) - 17th
- 2015 (Germany) - 17th

==== Roosters ====
- 1997: Regimantas Vaičiulis, Kęstutis Dambrauskas, Arūnas Tuminauskas, Gintautas Tacionis, Mindaugas Ražinskas, Gintaras Rasymas
- 1999: Regimantas Vaičiulis, Kęstutis Dambrauskas, Arūnas Tuminauskas, Gintautas Tacionis, Mindaugas Ražinskas, Gintaras Rasymas, Audrius Bernatavičius, Audrius Packevičius, Egidijus Jakavonis
- 2001: Regimantas Vaičiulis, Kęstutis Dambrauskas, Aurimas Kančys, Gintautas Tacionis, Arūnas Kunčinas, Gintaras Rasymas, Rimvydas Insoda
- 2013: Sigitas Ladyš, Lukas Kudaba, Robertas Paškovskis, Tomas Mikna, Augustas Platūkis, Vilius Rasimavičius, Povilas Atmanavičius.
