= Lithuania men's national under-21 basketball team =

Lithuania
- FIBA ranking: 6th
- Joined FIBA: 1936
- FIBA zone: FIBA Europe
- National federation: Lithuanian Basketball Federation
- Nickname(s): Basketball: The Second Religion, Game of the Nation

FIBA Under-21 World Championship
- Appearances: 2
- Medals: Gold: 1 (2005)
Home	Away

The Lithuania men's national under-21 basketball team (Lithuanian: Lietuvos nacionalinė vaikinų jaunimo iki 21 krepšinio rinktinė), is the representative for Lithuania in international basketball competitions, and it is organized and run by the Lithuanian Basketball Federation. The Lithuania men's national under-21 basketball team represents Lithuania at the FIBA Under-21 World Championship before it being discontinued by FIBA. Lithuanian national team won the last held version of the FIBA Under-21 World Championship in 2005.

== FIBA Under-21 World Championship record ==
Year	Pos.	Pld	W	L
(Spain) 1993	Did not participate			
(Australia) 1997	8th	8	2	6
(Japan) 2001	Did not qualify			
(Argentina) 2005	1st	8	7	1
Total	2/4	16	9	7
