= FIBA Under-21 World Championship =

International basketball tournament

- Formerly: FIBA 22 & Under World Championship (1993–1998); World Championship for Young Men (1998–2004)
- Sport: Basketball
- Founded: 1993
- Founder: FIBA
- First season: 1993
- Folded: 2005
- CEO: (Hong Kong) Dr. Carl Men Ky Ching (程万琦)
- No. of teams: 12
- Continent: FIBA (International)
- Last champion: Lithuania (1st title)
- Most titles: United States (2 titles)
- Related competitions: FIBA Under-17 World Cup; FIBA Under-19 World Cup

The FIBA Under-21 World Championship was a men's under-21-only basketball competition organized by the International Basketball Federation (FIBA). It was known as the FIBA 22 & Under World Championship before FIBA lowered the age limit to 21 years in December 1998, and had its name changed to World Championship for Young Men. The competition adopted its final name in 2004. FIBA later discontinued the world championship for this age group.

== Summaries ==
Year	Host	Final			Third Place Match		
Year	Host	Champion	Score	Second Place	Third Place	Score	Fourth Place
1993	(Spain); Valladolid	United States	87–73	France	Brazil	79–76	Italy
1997	(Australia); Melbourne	Australia	88–73	Puerto Rico	Yugoslavia	84–72	Argentina
2001	(Japan); Saitama	United States	89–80	Croatia	Argentina	87–82	Dominican Republic
2005	(Argentina); Mar del Plata	Lithuania	65–63	Greece	Canada	79–74	Australia

== Medal table ==
Rank	Nation	Gold	Silver	Bronze	Total
1	United States	2	0	0	2
2	Australia	1	0	0	1
2	Lithuania	1	0	0	1
4	Croatia	0	1	0	1
4	France	0	1	0	1
4	Greece	0	1	0	1
4	Puerto Rico	0	1	0	1
8	Argentina	0	0	1	1
8	Brazil	0	0	1	1
8	Canada	0	0	1	1
8	FR Yugoslavia	0	0	1	1
Totals (11 entries)		4	4	4	12

== Participation details ==
Team	(Spain) 1993	(Australia) 1997	(Japan) 2001	(Argentina) 2005	Total
Angola	10th				1
Argentina	6th	4th	3rd	6th	4
Australia	8th	1st	8th	4th	4
Brazil	3rd				1
Canada				3rd	1
China		12th		11th	2
Chinese Taipei	12th				1
Croatia			2nd		1
Dominican Republic			4th		1
Egypt		10th	9th		2
France	2nd				1
Greece	5th			2nd	2
Iran				12th	1
Israel	9th		7th	10th	3
Italy	4th				1
Japan			11th		1
South Korea	11th	9th	12th		3
Lithuania		8th		1st	2
New Zealand		11th			1
Nigeria				9th	1
Puerto Rico		2nd		7th	2
Qatar			10th		1
Slovenia			6th	8th	2
Spain	7th	7th	5th		3
Turkey		6th			1
United States	1st	5th	1st	5th	4
FR Yugoslavia		3rd			1
Total	12	12	12	12	
