= EuroBasket Women 1976 squads =

== Group A ==
=== Yugoslavia ===
Yugoslavia roster
Players
Coaches

Pos.	No.	Name	Age – Date of birth	Height	Club
	4	Slavojka Taušan	–
	5	Marija Veger	–
	6	Marijana Bušljeta	–
	7	Gordana Vukmirović	–
	8	Vukica Mitić	–
	9	Slavica Stojčinović	–
	10	Sofija Pekić	–
	11	Branka Jovanović	–
	12	Mira Bjedov	–
	13	Vera Đurašković	–
	14	Tatjana Pavlić	–
	15	Anđelka Vukmirović	–

Head coach

Borivoje Cenić

Legend

- (C) Team captain
- Injured
