= Serbia women's national under-20 basketball team =

National basketball team of Serbia

Serbia
- FIBA zone: FIBA Europe
- National federation: Basketball Federation of Serbia

U20 EuroBasket
- Appearances: 16
- Medals: (silver) Silver: 2 (2007, 2018); (bronze) Bronze: 1 (2008)

U20 EuroBasket Division B
- Appearances: 1
- Medals: (silver) Silver: 1 (2025)

Medal record

Women's basketball

Representing Serbia

FIBA U20 Women's EuroBasket
Silver medal – second place	2007 Sofia	
Silver medal – second place	2018 Sopron	
Bronze medal – third place	2008 Chieti, Sulmona & Pescara	

The Serbia women's national under-20 basketball team (Serbian Cyrillic: Женска кошаркашка репрезентација Србије до 20 година) is the women's basketball team, administered by the Basketball Federation of Serbia, that represents Serbia in international under-20 women's basketball competitions, consisting mainly of the FIBA U20 Women's EuroBasket.

== FIBA U20 Women's EuroBasket record ==
Division A
Year	Pos.	GP	W	L	Ref.
2000–2002	Part of FR Yugoslavia				
2004–2006	Part of Serbia and Montenegro				
(Bulgaria) 2007	2nd	8	6	2	
(Italy) 2008	3rd	8	6	2	
(Poland) 2009	7th	9	6	3	
(Latvia) 2010	8th	9	4	5	
(Serbia) 2011	4th	9	5	4	
(Hungary) 2012	11th	8	3	5	
(Turkey) 2013	8th	9	4	5	
(Italy) 2014	4th	9	5	4	
(Spain) 2015	10th	9	5	4	
(Portugal) 2016	4th	7	3	4	
(Portugal) 2017	9th	7	4	3	
(Hungary) 2018	2nd	7	5	2	
(Czech Republic) 2019	6th	7	4	3	
(Hungary) 2022	8th	7	3	4	
(Lithuania) 2023	4th	7	3	4	
(Lithuania) 2024	15th	7	1	6	
(Portugal) 2025	Played in Division B				
(Lithuania) 2026	14th	7	1	7	
Total	17/18	134	69	66	

Division B
Year	Pos.	GP	W	L	Ref.
(Hungary) 2025	2nd	7	6	1	

== Coaches ==
Years	Head coach	Assistant coach(es)
2007–2008	Jovica Antonić	2008 (Goran Stevanović, Dragan Vuković)
2009	Petar Marković	Dragan Vuković
2010	Dragomir Bukvić	Bogdan Bulj
2011	Milkan Mrđa	Bogdan Bulj, Aleksandar Jovanović, Damir Karan
2012–2013	Radenko Varagić	2012 (Marjan Stojanac, Vladan Stojiljković); 2013 (Miloš Pavlović, Miloš Pađen)
2014–2015	Igor Polenek	Milkan Mrđa, Ljubica Drljača
2016–2017	Bogdan Bulj	Dragan Ratković, Slobodan Subić, Ljubica Drljača
2018–2019	Miloš Pavlović	Vesna Despotović, Bojan Ivanović

== Rosters ==
=== Current roster ===
Roster for the 2025 FIBA U20 Women's EuroBasket Division B.

Serbia women's national under-20 basketball team – 2025 FIBA U20 Women's EuroBasket roster
Players
Coaches

Pos.	No.	Name	Age – Date of birth	Height	Club	Ctr.
G	2	Ivona Đikanović	19 – 21 December 2005	1.80 m (5 ft 11 in)	St. Bonaventure Bonnies	(United States)
PG	5	Jana Vesić	19 – 13 May 2006	1.75 m (5 ft 9 in)	Seattle Redhawks	(United States)
G	7	Imana Ćosović	18 – 20 October 2006	1.77 m (5 ft 10 in)	ŽKK Partizan	(Serbia)
PF	9	Tara Dacić	19 – 11 May 2006	1.87 m (6 ft 2 in)	Creighton Bluejays	(United States)
SF	10	Manuela Piljević	19 – 14 December 2005	1.78 m (5 ft 10 in)	Dodge City Conquistadors	(United States)
G	11	Minja Aranđelović	19 – 22 February 2006	1.77 m (5 ft 10 in)	ŽKK Mega Superbet	(Serbia)
PF	12	Anđela Janić	19 – 5 November 2005	1.82 m (6 ft 0 in)	ŽKK Kraljevo	(Serbia)
C	14	Jovana Jevtović	19 – 4 September 2005	1.91 m (6 ft 3 in)	Sopron Basket	(Hungary)
SF	19	Andrea Vasiljević	20 – 14 May 2005	1.77 m (5 ft 10 in)	ŽKK Spartak Subotica	(Serbia)
PG	21	Daria Nestorov	19 – 9 November 2005	1.62 m (5 ft 4 in)	Pacific Tigers	(United States)
PF	24	Ana Milanović	20 – 13 January 2005	1.88 m (6 ft 2 in)	Loyola Marymount Lions	(United States)
C	25	Sofija Todorović	19 – 1 April 2006	1.81 m (5 ft 11 in)	Cloud County Thunderbirds	(United States)

Head coach

- (Serbia) Miloš Pavlović

Assistant coach(es)

- (Serbia) Milica Janković
- (Serbia) Danilo Borović

Legend

- (C) Team captain
- Club – describes last
  club before the tournament
- Age – describes age
  on 28 July 2024

Roster

=== Past rosters ===
- 2007 European Championship — 2nd place
  Tamara Radočaj, Marina Ristić, Jelena Radić, Maja Šćekić, Tamara Bajić, Jovana Rad, Adrijana Knežević, Zorica Mitov, Dunja Prčić, Nina Đoković, Biljana Stjepanović, Miljana Bojović
- 2008 European Championship — 3rd place
  Ivana Musović, Dragana Gobeljić, Sonja Petrović, Ana Dabović, Smiljana Ivanović, Iva Roglić, Jelena Milovanović, Maja Miljković, Nina Bogićević, Jelena Cerina, Tijana Ajduković, Irena Matović
- 2018 European Championship — 2nd place
  Nevena Naumčev, Mina Đorđević, Vladana Vujisić, Tamara Jovančević, Lara Radulović, Marijana Zukanović, Teodora Turudić, Milica Bojović, Ivana Raca, Nevena Vučković, Ivana Katanić, Marija Stojanović

== See also ==
- Serbia women's national basketball team
- Serbia women's national under-18 and under-19 basketball team
- Serbia women's national under-16 and under-17 basketball team
- Serbia men's national under-20 basketball team
