= Dragomir Bukvić =

Slovene basketball coach

Borac Zemun

Personal information
- Born: 29 April 1954 (age 72) Belgrade, PR Serbia, FPR Yugoslavia

Career information
- Playing career: 1974–1984
- Coaching career: 1984–present

Career history

Coaching
- 1984–1985: Mladost Zemun (men's)
- 1986–1989: Partizan (youth)
- 1989–1991: Partizan (assistant)
- 1992–1994: Partizan
- 1994–1995: Crvena zvezda
- 1995–1996: Partizan
- 1997–1998: Kovin
- 1999–2000: Vojvodina
- 2000–2002: Lek Ježica
- 2002–2003: Merkur Celje
- 2003–2005: Vojvodina NIS-GAS
- 2005–2006: Crvena zvezda
- 2006–2007: Merkur Celje
- 2007–2008: Crvena zvezda
- 2009–2010: Pool Comense
- 2010–2013: Virtus Sogeit La Spezia
- 2014–2015: Grosbasket
- 2022–present: Borac Zemun (assistant)
Medals
Women's Basketball
Head coach for Yugoslavia / FR Yugoslavia /Serbia and Montenegro
European Championship for Cadettes
Silver medal – second place	1991 Portugal	U14 Team
Silver medal – second place	1999 Portugal	U16 Team
Summer Universiade
Silver medal – second place	2005 İzmir	Team

Dragomir Bukvić (Serbian Cyrillic: Драгомир Буквић; born 29 April 1954) is a Serbian professional basketball coach and former player.

== Playing career ==
Bukvić started to play basketball for youth teams of Sloboda Tuzla and Radnički Belgrade. He had his first senior basketball experience with Radnički Belgrade of the Yugoslav First League in the 1975–76 season. He served the army in 1976. Later he played for the Dinamo Pančevo and the Mladost Zemun. In 1984 he retired.

== Coaching career ==
=== Men's basketball ===
On the beginning of his coaching career he was head coach for the Mladost Zemun.

=== Women's club basketball ===
Bukvić coached teams in Serbia, Slovenia and Italy. He coached Partizan, Kovin, Vojvodina and Crvena zvezda of the First League of FY Yugoslavia/Serbia and Montenegro. Also, he spent the 2007–08 season with Crvena zvezda competing at the First League of Serbia. Bukvić coached the Lek Ježica, the Merkur Celje and the Grosbasket of the Slovenian League. He won three Slovenian championships and four cup tournaments. In Italy, he coached the Pool Comense and the Virtus Sogeit La Spezia of the Serie A1.

=== Women national teams ===
==== SFR Yugoslavia ====
Bukvić won silver medal at the 1991 European Championship for Cadettes with SFR Yugoslavia U14 national team. Also, he led women's university team at the 1995 Summer Universiade in Fukuoka.

==== FR Yugoslavia/Serbia and Montenegro ====
Bukvić was a head coach for the FR Yugoslavia women's national team at the EuroBasket Women 1995. Also, he led women's university team at the 1995 Summer Universiade in Fukuoka, Japan and at the 2005 Summer Universiade in İzmir, Turkey where he won a silver medal. He won silver medal at the 1999 European Championship for Cadettes with FR Yugoslavia U16 national team.

==== Serbia ====
Bukvić won silver medal at the 2006 FIBA Europe Under-20 Championship for Women - Division B with the Serbia women's national under-20 team. He also coached U20 at the 2010 Championship.

==== Slovenia ====
Bukvić was a head coach for the Slovenia women's national team from 2001 to 2003. He led women's university team at the 2003 Summer Universiade in Daegu, South Korea.

== Career achievements and awards ==
- Slovenian Women's Basketball League champion: 3 (with Lek Ježica: 2000–01, 2001–02 and with Merkur Celje: 2002–03)
- Yugoslav Women's Basketball Cup winner: 1 (with Crvena zvezda: 1994–95)
- Slovenian Women's Basketball Cup winner: 4 (with Lek Ježica: 2000–01, 2001–02 and with Merkur Celje: 2002–03, 2006–07)

Individual

- Slovenian Coach of the Year (women's basketball): 2001, 2002
