= Dragoljub Pljakić =

Serbian basketball player and coach

Personal information
- Born: 28 August 1937 Belgrade, Kingdom of Yugoslavia
- Died: 28 June 2011 (aged 73) Belgrade, Serbia

Career information
- Playing career: 1955–1964
- Coaching career: 1965–1993

Career history

Playing
- 1955–1958: Radnički Belgrade
- 1959: OKK Beograd
- 1960–1964: Radnički Belgrade

Coaching
- 1965–1967: Radnički Belgrade
- 1970–1971: Borac Čačak
- 1971–1974: Crvena zvezda Women
- 1976–1977: Metalac
- 1979–1981: Dinamo Pančevo
- 1982–1984: Partizan Women
- 1984–1985: OKK Beograd
- 1985–1991: Partizan Women
- 1992–1993: Radnički Belgrade

Dragoljub Pljakić (Serbian Cyrillic: Драгољуб Пљакић; August 28 1937 – June 28 2011), nicknamed "Pljaka", was a Serbian basketball player and coach.

== Playing career ==
Pljakić spent the major part of his playing career with Radnički from Belgrade, which played in the Yugoslav First Basketball League. During the 1959 season, he played for OKK Beograd.

== Coaching career ==
=== Men's Basketball ===
Pljakić coached Radnički Belgrade, Borac Čačak, Dinamo Pančevo, Metalac, OKK Beograd.

=== Women's Basketball ===
Pljakić coached Crvena zvezda and Partizan.

Pljakić was a head coach of the Yugoslavia women's national team that placed 6th at the 1964 FIBA World Championship for Women.

== Career achievements ==
=== Women's Basketball ===
- Yugoslav League champion: 3 (with Crvena zvezda: 1972–73 and with Partizan: 1983–84, 1985–86)
- Yugoslav Cup winner: 2 (with Crvena zvezda: 1972–73, 1973–74)

== Personal life ==
Pljakić was married to Vukica Mitić, a basketball player. She played for ŽKK Crvena zvezda and represented the Yugoslavia national team internationally.
