= Ljubica Otašević =

Serbian basketball player and actor (1933–1998)

- Љубица Оташевић
- Otašević in 1971
- Born: August 2, 1933; Ljutovnica, Danube Banovina, Kingdom of Yugoslavia
- Died: April 12, 1998 (aged 64); Houston, Texas, United States
- Other names: Liuba Bodin; Ljuba Bodine; Ljuba Otanovic
- Occupations: Basketball player; actress; socialite
- Spouse: Enrico di Portanova (m. 1965; div. 1972)
- Basketball career

Personal information
- Listed height: 1.78 m (5 ft 10 in)

Career information
- Playing career: 1951–1957
- Number: 12

Career history
- 1951–1954: Crvena zvezda
- 1954–1955: Necchi Pavia
- 1955–1957: Crvena zvezda

Career highlights
- 9× Yugoslav champion (1951–1957)

Ljubica "Buba" Otašević (Serbian Cyrillic: Љубица Оташевић; born August 2, 1933 – April 12, 1998) was a Yugoslav and Serbian actress, body double, and basketball player.

== Early life ==
Born in the village of Ljutovnica near Gornji Milanovac to a Royal Yugoslav Air Force officer father Božidar Otašević and mother Olga, young Ljubica grew up in Belgrade with a younger brother Duda. Their father was among the Yugoslav airmen that defended the country in April 1941 during the German invasion before getting captured by the invading Germans and taken to a Nazi concentration camp in Osnabrück where he was imprisoned until the end of World War II. In the meantime, her mother Olga had left the family so that young Ljubica and her brother were raised by their grandmother Danica in an apartment on Deligradska Street in Belgrade. Following the war, due to his royalist worldview, their father Božidar was unwilling to return home to Yugoslavia that had in the meantime become a communist people's republic. Otašević could thus only meet with her father abroad, which was further made difficult by FPR Yugoslavia's strict exit criteria. Still, she did manage to see him twice, in 1953 and 1954, in Italy and France, respectively, while playing in basketball tournaments with her club.

Simultaneously to playing basketball, Otašević enrolled at the University of Belgrade's Faculty of Philosophy.

== Basketball career ==
Eighteen-year-old Otašević began playing basketball at ŽKK Crvena zvezda in 1951.

She also made the Yugoslav national team and competed at the 1954 European Women's Basketball Championship held at home in Belgrade. It was the very first time that the Yugoslavia women's national basketball team appeared in a major international competition. Playing alongside her club teammates Gordana Baraga, Cmiljka "Cica" Kalušević, and Aleksandra Gec, Otašević appeared in six games at the competition, recording a total of 19 points (3.2ppg). The Yugoslav team made the final round where it lost four of its five games, ending the competition in fifth place.

Two years later, she represented Yugoslavia again at the 1956 European Women's Basketball Championship in Czechoslovakia. This time, Yugoslavia failed to make it out of their preliminary round-robin group and had to go to the classification round, eventually finishing the competition in ninth place. Otašević appeared in 7 games, scoring a total of 35 points (5.0ppg).

In 1957, the twenty-four-year-old student left FPR Yugoslavia for Italy, ostensibly to study Italian as part of university exchange. Although she would visit Yugoslavia briefly on few occasions, she never again returned to live in the country.

== Acting career ==
Otašević's career in movies started in 1957 shortly after her arrival to Italy from Yugoslavia. Several months later, during a short stay in England, the twenty-four-year-old got spotted by a Columbia Pictures producer and representative Carl Foreman who hired Otašević to be Sophia Loren's body double in the English film director Carol Reed's movie The Key starring Loren and William Holden that was filmed between July and December 1957 on various locations in England such as Henley-on-Thames, Isle of Portland, and Elstree Studios in Borehamwood. Due to Loren's absence from the set in the first days of shooting, Otašević reportedly appears in most of the frames where the character has her back to the camera or her face is not shown close-up.

Fifty-four-year-old Hollywood film star Cary Grant—who was married to Betsy Drake at the time and whose turbulent affair with Loren had just ended—soon became aware of Loren's body double Otašević and began to pursue the young Yugoslav, leading to a romantic involvement between the two. By January 1959, he brought her to Hollywood, signing her to a contract with his production company that did business with Universal Pictures and enrolling her in acting classes with a view of jump-starting a movie career for his young lover.

During summer 1960, Otašević briefly came back home to Belgrade in order to play a minor part in Love and Fashion.

In the early 1960s, in Rome, Otašević got a few roles in Italian movies such as The Hunchback of Rome, peplum film Triumph of the Son of Hercules, and comedy Maurizio, Peppino e le indossatrici. She appeared in these films using the alias Liuba Bodin.

== Personal life ==
In 1950, seventeen-year-old Otašević, a junior basketball player within the ŽKK Crvena zvezda youth system, began dating twenty-two-year-old KK Crvena zvezda and Yugoslavia national team small forward Srđan Kalember. Their respective families had a prior history as their fathers were both Royal Yugoslav Air Force officers; Srđan's father Jovan was the commanding officer to Otašević's father Božidar and, furthermore, both men were captured by the Germans in 1941 and imprisoned in the same Osnabrück concentration camp. Following World War II, Kalember's father returned to the newly-communist Yugoslavia while Otašević's father decided not to, staying abroad in Western Europe until his death in 1956. A year into dating Kalember, Otašević made the Crvena zvezda women's team full squad. For the next few years, they functioned as a prominent sports couple in the city of Belgrade, both wearing number 12 jerseys in KK Crvena zvezda's men's and women's teams, respectively, as basketball gained popularity throughout the post-war Yugoslav society. Their relationship lasted three and a half years before ending in 1954.

Otašević attracted plenty of male attention, with reports of various prominent men — such as the JNA general Peko Dapčević, UDBA security operative Ratko Dražević, and writer Ivo Andrić — coming to the Crvena Zvezda courts at Kalemegdan in order to watch her play.

After the relationship with Kalember ended, Otašević started dating another professional athlete — FK Partizan footballer Miloš Milutinović.

Soon after her 1957 move to Italy and appearance in The Key as Sophia Loren's body double, Otašević began a relationship with Hollywood movie star Cary Grant, twenty-eight years her senior and married to Betsy Drake at the time. Fresh off seeing his extramarital affair with Loren end in turbulent fashion, Grant jumped into a relationship with her body double Otašević. At first, the couple was mostly apart as Otašević lived in Rome while Grant divided his time between England and the United States, but, by January 1959, he brought her to Hollywood. Grant reportedly even accompanied Otašević when she briefly went back to Yugoslavia for her grandmother Danica's funeral. In December 2006, his love letters to Otašević, written between March 1958 and January 1959, were auctioned off at Christie's in London.

In the early 1960s, she caught the eye of flamboyant baron Enrico "Ricky" di Portanova, the American-born, Italian-raised son of an Italian baron, Paolo di Portanova, and American mother Lillie Cullen, the daughter of oil tycoon Hugh Roy Cullen. The young couple initially lived in Rome where di Portanova ran a jewelry business. After getting married, the couple moved to Houston, Texas in order for di Portanova to try and collect his share of his late maternal grandfather's oil inheritance, which he eventually succeeded in doing. By the mid-to-late 1960s, Otašević's marriage to di Portanova was on the rocks and the two officially divorced in 1972.

Following a divorce settlement in which she reportedly got USD1.5 million, Otašević divided her time between her property in Houston and a villa in Marbella, Spain.

== In popular culture ==
In the 2015 Serbian sports drama We Will Be the World Champions, Otašević is portrayed by Nina Janković.
