= Veger =

Veger is a surname. Notable people with the surname include:

- Filip Veger (born 1994), Croatian tennis player and coach
- Marija Veger (born 1947), Serbian basketball player
