= Snežana =

Female given name

Snežana (Cyrillic: Снежана), also transliterated Snezhana, is a Slavic, Circassian, and Lithuanian feminine given name, possibly derived from sneg ("snow"). One of interpretations is that Snežana is a name of folk origin, derived from the words "snow" and "jana". It is popular in former Yugoslavia, Russia and Bulgaria. Other spellings include Snježana and Sniježana, found in Ijekavian-speaking areas (Croatia, Bosnia and Herzegovina , Serbia, Montenegro). Snežana was the fifth most popular name in North Macedonia in 2011. In the decade from 1960 to 1970 Snežana was the most popular name in Serbia.

== Variations ==
Female forms:
Сняжана,(Bielorussian)
Сніжанна, Сніжана, (Ukrainian)
Снежа́на, Снежа́нна. Снежок, Снежа́ночка are diminutives. (Russian)
Snežana, Sneža, (Slovenian)
Snežana, Снежана, (Serbian and Bosnian)
Snježana, Sniježana, (Croatian and Bosnian)
Снежана, (Bulgarian and Macedonian)
Sněžana, (Czech)
Sneža, Снежа, Snežanka, Snežica, Snežka, Снежка, Snežna - diminutives

Male forms:
Snežan, Snežko
Snježan, Snježko

== Notable people named Snežana ==
- Snežana Rodič, Slovenian triple jumper
- Snežana Pajkić, Yugoslav middle distance runner
- Snežana Aleksić, Montenegrin basketball player
- Snežana Bogdanović, Serbian actress
- Snežana Hrepevnik, Serbian Olympic athlete
- Snežana Pantić, Serbian karateka
- Snežana Babić, Serbian singer
- Snežana Malović, Serbian politician
- Snežana Samardžić-Marković, Minister of Youth and Sports of Serbia
- Snežana Prorok, Bosnian model
- Snežana Nikšić, Serbian actress
- Snežana Zorić, Yugoslavian basketball player
- Snežana Maleševič, Slovenian international footballer
- Snejana Onopka, Ukrainian model

== See also ==
- Slavic names
