= 1947 Yugoslav Women's Basketball League =

- League: Yugoslav First League
- Sport: Basketball
- Number of games: 8
- Number of teams: 5

1947
- Season champions: (Socialist Federal Republic of Yugoslavia) Crvena zvezda (2nd title)

Yugoslav Women's Basketball League seasons
- ← 1946 1948 →

The 1947 Yugoslav Women's Basketball League is the 3rd season of the Yugoslav Women's Basketball League, the highest professional basketball league in Yugoslavia for women's. Championships is played in 1947 in Zagreb and played five teams. Champion for this season is Crvena zvezda.

== Table ==
| Place | Team | Pld | W | L | PF | PA | Diff | Pts | |
|---|---|---|---|---|---|---|---|---|---|
| 1. | Crvena zvezda | 4 | 4 | 0 | 165 | 78 | +87 | 8 | Champion |
| 2. | Zadar | 4 | 3 | 1 | 136 | 113 | +23 | 6 | |
| 3. | Proleter Zrenjanin | 4 | 2 | 2 | 99 | 109 | -10 | 4 | |
| 4. | Proleter Rijeka | 4 | 1 | 3 | 92 | 111 | -19 | 2 | |
| 5. | Enotnost Ljubljana | 4 | 0 | 4 | 70 | 151 | -81 | 0 | |
