= 1950 Yugoslav Women's Basketball League =

- League: Yugoslav First League
- Sport: Basketball
- Number of games: 20
- Number of teams: 9

1950
- Season champions: (Socialist Federal Republic of Yugoslavia) Crvena zvezda (5th title)

Yugoslav Women's Basketball League seasons
- ← 1949 1951 →

The 1920 Yugoslav Women's Basketball League is the 6th season of the Yugoslav Women's Basketball League, the highest professional basketball league in Yugoslavia for women's. Championships is played in 1949 played nine teams. Champion for this season is Crvena zvezda.

== Regular season ==
=== Group A ===
Place	Team	Pld	W	L	PF	PA	Diff	Pts
1.	Crvena zvezda	4	4	0	175	74	+101	8
2.	Železničar Beograd	4	3	1	165	71	+ 94	6
3.	Železničar Ljubljana	4	2	2	95	116	-21	4
4.	Naprijed Zagreb	4	1	3	94	118	-24	2
5.	Vardar Skoplje	4	0	4	59	209	-150	0

=== Group B ===
Place	Team	Pld	W	L	PF	PA	Diff	Pts
1.	Split	3	3	0	125	44	+81	6
2.	Proleter Zrenjanin	3	2	1	152	68	+84	4
3.	Lokomotiva Zagreb	3	1	2	69	74	-5	2
4.	Polet Maribor	3	0	3	30	190	-160	0

== Play Off ==
club 1	result	club 2
for 7th place
Polet Zagreb	37:35	Naprijed Zagreb
for 5th place
Železničar Ljubljana	31:23	Lokomotiva Zagreb
for 3rd place
Proleter Zrenjanin	31:17	Železničar Beograd
for 1st place
Crvena zvezda	27:21	Split
