= 1951 Yugoslav Women's Basketball League =

- League: Yugoslav First League
- Sport: Basketball
- Number of games: 30
- Number of teams: 6

1951
- Season champions: (Socialist Federal Republic of Yugoslavia) Crvena zvezda (6th title)

Yugoslav Women's Basketball League seasons
- ← 1950 1952 →

The 1951 Yugoslav Women's Basketball League is the 7th season of the Yugoslav Women's Basketball League, the highest professional basketball league in Yugoslavia for women's. Championships is played in 1951 and played six teams. Champion for this season is Crvena zvezda.

== Table ==
Place	Team	Pld	W	D	L	PF	PA	Diff	Pts	
1.	Crvena zvezda	10	9	1	0	448	264	+184	19	Champion
2.	Proleter Zrenjanin	10	7	1	2	355	282	+73	15	
3.	Split	10	6	0	4	325	277	+48	12	
4.	Lokomotiva Zagreb	10	4	0	6	273	310	-37	8	
5.	Železničar Beograd	10	6	0	7	323	346	-23	6	
6.	Železničar Ljubljana	10	0	0	10	261	506	-245	0	
