= Jasmina Milosavljević =

Yugoslavian and Serbian basketball player

Personal information
- Born: February 13, 1958 (age 68) Belgrade, SFR Yugoslavia
- Position: Center

Career history
- 1972–198?: Crvena zvezda

Jasmina "Jasna" Milosavljević (Serbian: Јасмина Милосављевић; born February 13, 1958) is a Yugoslavian and Serbian former female basketball player.
