= ŽKK Crvena zvezda =

Basketball club in Belgrade, Serbia

Crvena zvezda
- Nickname: Crveno-bele (Red and Whites)
- Leagues: Basketball League of Serbia; EuroLeague Women
- Founded: 4 March 1945; 81 years ago
- History: ŽKK Crvena zvezda (1945–present)
- Arena: Ranko Žeravica Sports Hall
- Capacity: 5,000
- Location: Belgrade, Serbia
- Team colors: Red and White
- President: (Serbia) Anđelka Vukmirović
- Head coach: (Serbia) Marina Maljković
- Championships: 1 EuroLeague; 36 National Championships; 17 National Cups
- Website: kkzcrvenazvezda.rs
| Home | Away |

Košarkaški klub ženski Crvena zvezda (Serbian Cyrillic: Kошаркашки клуб женски Црвена звезда, English: Red Star Women Basketball Club), commonly referred to as KKŽ Crvena zvezda or simply Crvena zvezda and, for sponsorship reasons, also known as KKŽ Crvena zvezda Meridianbet, is a women's professional basketball club based in Belgrade, Serbia and the major part of the Red Star multi-sports club. Crvena zvezda competes in the EuroLeague Women and in the Basketball League of Serbia.

The Crvena zvezda squads have won a record 36 National League championships, including 15-in-a-row and 6-in-a-row sequences. They have played three different National Leagues since 1945, including Yugoslav Women's Basketball League (1945–1992), First Women's Basketball League of Serbia and Montenegro (1992–2006) and Serbian League (2006 onwards). They have also won a record 17 National Cup titles and one EuroLeague Women Championship.

Some of the club's star players over the years have included: Cmiljka Kalušević, Snežana Zorić, Vukica Mitić, Zorica Ðurković, Jasmina Milosavljević, Sofija Pekić, Anđelija Arbutina and Ana Joković.

== History ==
Red Star was the major powerhouse in the early stages of the Yugoslav Championship, winning 15 championships in a row between 1945 and 1960. In 1958, it was the first team to represent Yugoslavia in the newly founded European Cup, reaching the tournament's semifinals.

The team wasn't able to win the national championship between 1964 and 1972, but it emerged in the second half of the 1970s winning six national titles in a row. In 1979, it achieved its greatest success by winning the European Cup beating BSE Budapest in the final by 97-62. As of 2021, this remains the highest scoring in a European Cup / Euroleague final. Red Star was the first of only two teams from Yugoslavia to win the competition.

Red Star again reached the European Cup final in 1981, losing this time to Daugava Riga. The following years were less successful, and the team had to wait until 1990 to return to the competition, marking its seventh appearance in the semi-finals.

During the Yugoslav Wars, Red Star was disqualified from the 1992–93 European Champions Cup in accordance with the UNSC Resolution 757. The team returned to European competition in 1995 through the second tier Ronchetti Cup. It has since appeared in the Ronchetti Cup and its successor the Eurocup in 1996, 1999, 2002, 2003, 2008, 2021, 2022, 2024 and 2025, with modest results.

After 36 years of waiting, Red Star qualified for the 2026–27 EuroLeague Women.

== Sponsorship naming ==
Crvena zvezda has had several denominations through the years due to its sponsorship:

- Crvena zvezda Belim: 1993–1994
- Crvena zvezda Kombank: 2019–2021
- Crvena zvezda mts: 2021–2023
- Crvena zvezda Meridianbet: 2024–present

== Honours ==
Total titles: 54

| Honours | | No. | Years |
League – 36
| Yugoslav League (1946–1992) | Winners | 25 | 1946, 1947, 1948, 1949, 1950, 1951, 1952, 1953, 1954, 1955, 1956, 1957, 1958, 1959, 1960, 1963, 1973, 1976, 1977, 1978, 1979, 1980, 1981, 1989, 1992 |
| Serbia and Montenegro League (1992–2006) | Winners | 3 | 1992–93, 1995–96, 2003–04 |
| Serbian League (2006–present) | Winners | 8 | 2016–17, 2017–18, 2018–19, 2020–21, 2021–22, 2022–23, 2024–25, 2025–26 |
Cups – 17
| Yugoslav Cup (1971–1992) | Winners | 6 | 1973, 1974, 1976, 1979, 1981, 1992 |
| Serbia and Montenegro Cup (1992–2006) | Winners | 4 | 1994, 1995, 2003, 2004 |
| Milan Ciga Vasojević Cup (2006–present) | Winners | 7 | 2016, 2017, 2019, 2022, 2023, 2025, 2026 |
European – 1
| EuroLeague Women | Winners | 1 | 1978–79 |

=== Other international achievements ===
- Triple Crown
  - Winners (1): 1978–79
- EuroLeague Women
  - Runners-up (1): 1980–81
  - Third place (1): 1989–90
  - Semi-finals (5): 1958–59, 1959–60, 1963–64, 1977–78, 1979–80
- Ronchetti Cup
  - Semi-finals (2): 1972–73, 1974–75
- Adriatic League
  - Runners-up (1): 2013–14
  - Semi-finals (2): 2017–18, 2018–19

== Players ==
=== Current roster ===

Note: Flags indicate national team eligibility at FIBA-sanctioned events. Players may hold other non-FIBA nationalities not displayed.

Crvena zvezda roster
Players
Coaches

| Pos. | No. | Nat. | Name | Ht. | Age |
|---|---|---|---|---|---|
| SG | 1 | (Serbia) | Naumčev, Nevena | 1.71 m (5 ft 7 in) | 27 – 10 July 1999 |
| PG | 2 | (Serbia) | Katanić, Ivana | 1.74 m (5 ft 9 in) | 27 – 16 April 1999 |
| C | 3 | (Montenegro) | Akšam, Sanja | 1.87 m (6 ft 2 in) | 19 – 30 August 2007 |
| SG | 5 | (United States) | Collier, Aliyah | 1.83 m (6 ft 0 in) | 29 – 6 September 1997 |
| SF | 6 | (Israel) | Dahan Sujić, Dorian | 1.86 m (6 ft 1 in) | 22 – 14 June 2004 |
| SG | 7 | (Serbia) | Panić, Tina | 1.72 m (5 ft 8 in) | 21 – 23 November 2004 |
| SF | 8 | (Serbia) | Tanović, Sara | 1.81 m (5 ft 11 in) | 17 – 30 January 2009 |
| PG | 10 | (Serbia) | Rađenović, Kristina | 1.75 m (5 ft 9 in) | 18 – 24 January 2008 |
| C | 11 | (Australia) (Latvia) | Scherf, Lauren | 1.95 m (6 ft 5 in) | 30 – 7 March 1996 |
| PF | 12 | (United Kingdom) | Wilkinson, Savannah | 1.83 m (6 ft 0 in) | 28 – 31 October 1998 |
| SG | 13 | (Serbia) | Nedeljkov, Nadežda | 1.71 m (5 ft 7 in) | 25 – 6 April 2001 |
| C | 14 | (Portugal) | da Silva, Sofia | 1.90 m (6 ft 3 in) | 36 – 30 July 1990 |
| F/C | 15 | (Greece) | Spanou, Artemis | 1.86 m (6 ft 1 in) | 33 – 1 January 1993 |
| SF | 17 | (Serbia) | Mutavdžić, Ana | 1.79 m (5 ft 10 in) | 18 – 22 February 2008 |
| C | 20 | (Serbia) | Avramović, Mia | 1.96 m (6 ft 5 in) | 17 – 18 August 2009 |
| F/C | 22 | (Serbia) | Gluhavičanin, Lejla | 1.93 m (6 ft 4 in) | 22 – 23 February 2004 |
| SF | 23 | (Israel) | Levi, Romi | 1.88 m (6 ft 2 in) | 26 – 23 August 2000 |
| SF | 24 | (Serbia) | Turudić, Teodora (C) | 1.80 m (5 ft 11 in) | 27 – 19 July 1999 |
| PF | 32 | (Serbia) | Dugalić, Angela | 1.93 m (6 ft 4 in) | 24 – 29 December 2001 |
| PG | 33 | (United States) | Henderson, Destanni | 1.72 m (5 ft 8 in) | 27 – 2 February 1999 |

Head coach

- (Serbia) Marina Maljković

Assistant coach(es)

- (Turkey) Yaşar Can Nazlı
- (Serbia) Miloš Pađen
- (Serbia) Nemanja Planojević
- (Serbia) Bojan Krstović

Strength & conditioning coach(es)

- (Serbia) Ivan Brnjas

Team manager

- (Serbia) Ilija Kovačić

Legend

- (C) Team captain
- Injured

- Roster
Updated: 6 October 2026

=== Honored numbers ===
Crvena zvezda honored numbers
| No | Nat. | Player | Position | Tenure | Ref. |
|---|---|---|---|---|---|
| 4 | (Serbia) | Anđelija Arbutina | SG | 1983–1994 | |
| 8 | (Serbia) | Vukica Mitić | PG | | |
| 12 | (Serbia) | Zorica Ðurković | SG | | |
| 12 | (Serbia) | Snežana Zorić | SG | 1964–1976 | |
| 15 | (Serbia) | Sofija Pekić | C | | |

== Coaches ==
- (Socialist Federal Republic of Yugoslavia) Nebojša Popović (1946–1952)
- (Socialist Federal Republic of Yugoslavia) Milorad Sokolović (1952–1957)
- (Socialist Federal Republic of Yugoslavia) Strahinja Alagić (1957–1960)
- (Socialist Federal Republic of Yugoslavia) Dragan Godžić (1961)
- (Socialist Federal Republic of Yugoslavia) Dimitrije Krstić (1962–1964)
- (Socialist Federal Republic of Yugoslavia) Milan Vasojević (1965–1967)
- (Socialist Federal Republic of Yugoslavia) Sreten Dragojlović (1967–1971)
- (Socialist Federal Republic of Yugoslavia) Dragoljub Pljakić (1971–1974)
- (Socialist Federal Republic of Yugoslavia) Strahinja Alagić (1974–1981)
- (Socialist Federal Republic of Yugoslavia) Zoran Kovačić (1981–1988)
- (Socialist Federal Republic of Yugoslavia) Vladislav Lučić (1988–1990)
- (Serbia and Montenegro) Zoran Kovačić (1990–1994)
- (Serbia and Montenegro) Dragomir Bukvić (1994–1995)
- (Serbia and Montenegro) Zoran Tir (1995–1996)
- (Serbia and Montenegro) Stevan Karadžić (1996–1998)
- (Serbia and Montenegro) Srđan Antić (1998–2000)
- (Serbia and Montenegro) Milan Nisić (2000)
- (Serbia and Montenegro) Vladislav Lučić (2000–2004)
- (Serbia and Montenegro) Jovica Antonić (2004)
- (Serbia and Montenegro) Dragomir Bukvić (2005–2006)
- (Serbia) Zoran Višić (2006–2007)
- (Serbia) Dragomir Bukvić (2007–2008)
- (Serbia) Miroslav Kanjevac (2009–2011)
- (Serbia) Jovan Gorec (2011–2012)
- (Serbia) Zoran Kovačić (2012–2013)
- (Serbia) Dragan Vuković (2013–2024)
- (Serbia) Nemanja Planojević (2024–2025)
- (Serbia) Marina Maljković (2025–present)

== Notable players ==
Note: Flags indicate national team eligibility at FIBA-sanctioned events. Players may hold other non-FIBA nationalities not displayed.

Criteria

To appear in this section a player must have either:

- Set a club record or won an individual award while at the club
- Played at least one official international match for their national team at any time
- Played at least one official NBA match at any time.

- (Socialist Federal Republic of Yugoslavia) Sonja Mladenović
- (Socialist Federal Republic of Yugoslavia) Mira Petrović
- (Socialist Federal Republic of Yugoslavia) Ljubica Otašević
- (Socialist Federal Republic of Yugoslavia) Branka Prelević
- (Socialist Federal Republic of Yugoslavia) Aleksandra Dakić–Gec
- (Socialist Federal Republic of Yugoslavia) Gordana Baraga–Bjegojević
- (Socialist Federal Republic of Yugoslavia) Cmiljka Kalušević
- (Socialist Federal Republic of Yugoslavia) Snežana Zorić
- (Socialist Federal Republic of Yugoslavia) Vukica Mitić
- (Socialist Federal Republic of Yugoslavia) Zorica Đurković
- (Socialist Federal Republic of Yugoslavia) Jasmina Milosavljević
- (Socialist Federal Republic of Yugoslavia) Sofija Pekić
- (Socialist Federal Republic of Yugoslavia) Natalija Bacanović
- (Socialist Federal Republic of Yugoslavia) Zagorka Počeković
- (Socialist Federal Republic of Yugoslavia) Bojana Milošević
- (Socialist Federal Republic of Yugoslavia) Anđelija Arbutina
- (Socialist Federal Republic of Yugoslavia) Eleonora Vild
- (Serbia and Montenegro) Gordana Bogojević
- (Serbia and Montenegro) Lara Mandić
- (Serbia and Montenegro) Nina Bjedov
- (Serbia and Montenegro) Katarina Lazić
- (Serbia and Montenegro) Milka Bjelica
- (Serbia and Montenegro) Ana Joković
- (Serbia and Montenegro) Katarina Manić
- (Serbia and Montenegro) Milica Dabović
- (Serbia and Montenegro) Ivanka Matić
- (Serbia and Montenegro) Stojanka Ostojić
- (Serbia) Sonja Vasić
- (Serbia) Aleksandra Crvendakić
- (Serbia) Aleksandra Stanaćev
- (Serbia) Nataša Kovačević
- (Serbia) Mina Đorđević
- (Serbia) Aleksandra Katanić
- (Serbia) Snežana Bogićević
- (Serbia) Ivana Katanić
- (Serbia) Maša Janković
- (Serbia) Yvonne Anderson
