= 1948 Yugoslav Women's Basketball League =

- League: Yugoslav First League
- Sport: Basketball
- Number of games: 15
- Number of teams: 6

1948
- Season champions: (Socialist Federal Republic of Yugoslavia) Crvena zvezda (3rd title)

Yugoslav Women's Basketball League seasons
- ← 1947 1949 →

The 1948 Yugoslav Women's Basketball League is the 4th season of the Yugoslav Women's Basketball League, the highest professional basketball league in Yugoslavia for women's. The championships were played in 1948 in Belgrade and played six teams. Champion for this season is Crvena zvezda.

== Table ==
Place	Team	Pld	W	L	PF	PA	Diff	Pts	
1.	Crvena zvezda	5	5	0	297	85	+212	10	Champion
2.	Proleter Zrenjanin	5	4	1	267	80	+187	8	
3.	Hajduk Split	5	3	2	223	154	+69	6	
4.	Dinamo Zagreb	5	2	3	149	171	-22	4	
5.	Enotnost Ljubljana	5	1	4	117	248	-131	2	
6.	Vardar Skoplje	5	0	5	36	351	-315	0	
