= Snezhana =

Snezhana is a variant of Snežana when transliterated from Cyrillic Снежана (Russian, Bulgarian etc.)

- Snezhana Apostolova (born 1972), Bulgarian economist and politician, M.P.
- Snezhana Abarzhi
- Snezhana Kerkova
- Snezhana Khristakieva
- Snezhana Kurgambaeva
- Snezhana Mikhaylova
- Snezhana Yurukova
