= Anđelija Arbutina =

Serbian basketball player (born 1967)

Personal information
- Born: 29 March 1967 (age 59) Belgrade, SR Serbia, SFR Yugoslavia
- Listed height: 1.78 m (5 ft 10 in)
- Listed weight: 68 kg (150 lb)

Career information
- Playing career: 1982–2003
- Position: Shooting guard

Career history
- 1983–1992: Crvena zvezda
- 1992–1993: GEAS Milano
- 1993–1994: Crvena zvezda
- 1994–1995: Bečej
- 1995–1996: Hemofarm
- 1996–1997: DVTK Miskolc
- 1997–1998: Lavezzini Parma
- 1998: Fenerbahçe
- 1998–1999: A.S. Ramat HaSharon
- 1999–2000: Razvojna Banka Banja Luka
- 2000–2001: A.S. Ramat HaSharon
- 2001–2002: Maccabi Tel Aviv
- 2002–2003: Hemofarm

Career highlights
- No. 4 honored by Crvena zvezda
Medals
Women's basketball
Representing Yugoslavia
Summer Olympics
Silver medal – second place	1988 Seoul	Team competition
FIBA World Championship
Silver medal – second place	1990 Kuala Lumpur	Team competition
EuroBasket
Silver medal – second place	1987 Cadiz	Team competition
Silver medal – second place	1991 Tel Aviv	Team competition
Universiade
Gold medal – first place	1987 Zagreb	Team competition

Anđelija Arbutina Šarenac (born 29 March 1967) is a former Serbian basketball player who competed for Yugoslavia in the 1988 Summer Olympics. She made the winning basket during a semi-final with Australia.

== Career achievements ==
- Yugoslav League champion: 2 (with Crvena zvezda: 1988–89, 1991–92)
- Israeli League champion: 2 (with A.S. Ramat HaSharon: 1998–99, 2000–01)
- Yugoslav Cup champion: 1 (with Crvena zvezda: 1991–92)
- Yugoslav (Serbia and Montenegro) Cup winner: 2 (with Crvena zvezda: 1993–94; with Hemofarm: 1994–95)
- Israeli State Cup winner: 1 (with A.S. Ramat HaSharon: 1998–99)
