= 2006 FIBA Europe Under-20 Championship for Women Division B =

Basketball tournament

Tournament details
- Host country: Druskininkai
- City: Lithuania
- Dates: 7–16 July 2006
- Teams: 11 (from 1 confederation)
- Venue: 1 (in 1 host city)

Final positions
- Champions: Belarus (1st title)
- Runners-up: Serbia and Montenegro
- Third place: Slovakia

Official website
- www.fibaeurope.com

The 2006 FIBA Europe Under-20 Championship for Women Division B was the second edition of the Division B of the Women's European basketball championship for national under-20 teams. It was held in Druskininkai, Lithuania, from 7 to 16 July 2006. Belarus women's national under-20 basketball team won the tournament.

== Participating teams ==
- Belarus
- Great Britain
- Ireland
- Lithuania
- Netherlands
- Portugal
- Serbia and Montenegro
- Slovakia
- Slovenia
- Sweden
- Switzerland

== First round ==
In the first round, the teams were drawn into two groups. The first four teams from each group advance to the quarterfinals, the other teams will play in the 9th–11th place playoffs.

=== Group A ===
Pos	Team	Pld	W	L	PF	PA	PD	Pts	Qualification
1	Serbia and Montenegro	5	4	1	370	230	+140	9	Quarterfinals
2	Belarus	5	4	1	381	284	+97	9	Quarterfinals
3	Great Britain	5	4	1	303	260	+43	9	Quarterfinals
4	Slovenia	5	2	3	291	320	−29	7	Quarterfinals
5	Switzerland	5	1	4	269	350	−81	6	9th–11th place playoffs
6	Ireland	5	0	5	192	362	−170	5	9th–11th place playoffs

Source: FIBA Archive

7 July 2006

Boxscore

Switzerland	53–78	Belarus

7 July 2006

Boxscore

Serbia and Montenegro	67–44	Slovenia

7 July 2006

Boxscore

Great Britain	57–24	Ireland

8 July 2006

Boxscore

Belarus	71–68	Serbia and Montenegro

8 July 2006

Boxscore

Ireland	56–65	Switzerland

8 July 2006

Boxscore

Slovenia	61–69	Great Britain

9 July 2006

Boxscore

Ireland	39–91	Belarus

9 July 2006

Boxscore

Great Britain	40–69	Serbia and Montenegro

9 July 2006

Boxscore

Switzerland	54–66	Slovenia

11 July 2006

Boxscore

Belarus	59–63	Great Britain

11 July 2006

Boxscore

Slovenia	59–48	Ireland

11 July 2006

Boxscore

Serbia and Montenegro	76–50	Switzerland

12 July 2006

Boxscore

Slovenia	61–82	Belarus

12 July 2006

Boxscore

Switzerland	47–74	Great Britain

12 July 2006

Boxscore

Ireland	25–90	Serbia and Montenegro

=== Group B ===
Pos	Team	Pld	W	L	PF	PA	PD	Pts	Qualification
1	Slovakia	4	4	0	278	209	+69	8	Quarterfinals
2	Netherlands	4	3	1	262	232	+30	7	Quarterfinals
3	Lithuania	4	2	2	289	288	+1	6	Quarterfinals
4	Portugal	4	1	3	257	279	−22	5	Quarterfinals
5	Sweden	4	0	4	219	297	−78	4	9th–11th place playoffs

Source: FIBA Archive

7 July 2006

Boxscore

Lithuania	56–58	Slovakia

7 July 2006

Boxscore

Sweden	45–72	Netherlands

8 July 2006

Boxscore

Portugal	60–56	Sweden

8 July 2006

Boxscore

Netherlands	74–68	Lithuania

9 July 2006

Boxscore

Slovakia	59–54	Netherlands

9 July 2006

Boxscore

Lithuania	89–87	Portugal

11 July 2006

Boxscore

Sweden	69–76	Lithuania

11 July 2006

Boxscore

Portugal	50–72	Slovakia

12 July 2006

Boxscore

Netherlands	62–60	Portugal

12 July 2006

Boxscore

Slovakia	89–49	Sweden

== 9th–11th place playoffs ==
9th–11th place semifinal			9th place match
B5	Sweden	74
A6	Ireland	42	B5	Sweden	73
			A5	Switzerland	67

=== 9th–11th place semifinal ===
14 July 2006

Boxscore

Sweden	74–42	Ireland

=== 9th place match ===
15 July 2006

Boxscore

Sweden	73–67	Switzerland

== Championship playoffs ==
Fifth place
A4	Slovenia	62
B4	Portugal	56
Seventh place
B3	Lithuania	74
B2	Netherlands	61

Consolation semifinals
B3	Lithuania	55
A4	Slovenia	69
B2	Netherlands	71
B4	Portugal	77

Quarterfinals
A2	Belarus	73
B3	Lithuania	51
B1	Slovakia	64
A4	Slovenia	56
B2	Netherlands	57
A3	Great Britain	63
A1	Serbia and Montenegro	81
B4	Portugal	44

Semifinals
A2	Belarus	66
B1	Slovakia	59
A3	Great Britain	68
A1	Serbia and Montenegro	77

Final
A2	Belarus	66
A1	Serbia and Montenegro	58
Third place
B1	Slovakia	84
A3	Great Britain	52

=== Quarterfinals ===
14 July 2006

Boxscore

Belarus	73–51	Lithuania

14 July 2006

Boxscore

Slovakia	64–56	Slovenia

14 July 2006

Boxscore

Netherlands	57–63	Great Britain

14 July 2006

Boxscore

Serbia and Montenegro	81–44	Portugal

=== 5th–8th place playoffs ===
15 July 2006

Boxscore

Lithuania	55–69	Slovenia

15 July 2006

Boxscore

Netherlands	71–77	Portugal

=== Semifinals ===
15 July 2006

Boxscore

Belarus	66–59	Slovakia

15 July 2006

Boxscore

Great Britain	68–77	Serbia and Montenegro

=== 7th place match ===
16 July 2006

Boxscore

Lithuania	74–61	Netherlands

=== 5th place match ===
16 July 2006

Boxscore

Slovenia	62–56	Portugal

=== 3rd place match ===
16 July 2006

Boxscore

Slovakia	84–52	Great Britain

=== Final ===
16 July 2006

Boxscore

Belarus	66–58	Serbia and Montenegro

== Final standings ==
Team promoted to the 2007 FIBA Europe Under-20 Championship for Women Division A

Rank	Team
1st place, gold medalist(s)	Belarus
2nd place, silver medalist(s)	Serbia and Montenegro
3rd place, bronze medalist(s)	Slovakia
4	Great Britain
5	Slovenia
6	Portugal
7	Lithuania
8	Netherlands
9	Sweden
10	Switzerland
11	Ireland
