= 2025 FIBA U20 Women's EuroBasket =

International youth basketball tournament

Tournament details
- Host country: Portugal
- City: Matosinhos
- Dates: 2–10 August 2025
- Teams: 16 (from 1 confederation)
- Venues: 2 (in 1 host city)

Final positions
- Champions: Spain (10th title)
- Runners-up: Lithuania
- Third place: Italy

Tournament statistics
- MVP: (Spain) Gina Garcia

Official website
- www.fiba.basketball

The 2025 FIBA U20 Women's EuroBasket was the 22nd edition of the European basketball championship for women's national under-20 teams. The tournament was played in Matosinhos, Portugal, from 2 to 10 August 2025.

Spain secured their 10th overall title with a victory over Lithuania in the final, 102–50.

== Participating teams ==
Team	App	Last	Streak	Best placement in the tournament	Prev
Teams Maintained from the 2024 Edition
France	21st	2024	21	Champions (2005, 2009, 2014, 2023, 2024)	1st
Germany	16th	2024	2	Fourth place (2024)	4th
Israel	5th	2024	3	Seventh place (2023)	9th
Italy	22nd	2024	22	Champions (2019)	3rd
Latvia	20th	2024	10	Runners-up (2023)	8th
Lithuania	12th	2024	5	Sixth place (2010)	10th
Poland	19th	2024	15	Runners-up (2005)	6th
Portugal	10th	2024	9	Sixth place (2015, 2022, 2023)	11th
Slovenia	4th	2024	2	Runners-up (2017)	5th
Spain	22nd	2024	22	Champions (2007, 2011, 2012, 2013, 2015, 2016, 2017, 2018, 2022)	2nd
Sweden	13th	2024	8	Sixth place (2012)	12th
Turkey	18th	2024	3	Third place (2012, 2013)	7th
Teams Promoted from the Division B
Belgium	14th	2023	1	Fourth place (2019)	▲2nd, Div. B
Czechia	14th	2023	1	Champions (2002)	▲3rd, Div. B
Iceland	1st	Debut			▲4th, Div. B
Netherlands	12th	2022	1	Third place (2015, 2018)	▲1st, Div. B

== First round ==
The draw of the first round was held on 28 January 2025 in Freising, Germany.

In the first round, the teams were drawn into four groups of four. All teams will advance to the playoffs.

All times are local (Western European Summer Time; UTC+1).

=== Group A ===
Pos	Team	Pld	W	L	PF	PA	PD	Pts
1	Belgium	3	3	0	274	237	+37	6
2	Spain	3	2	1	260	196	+64	5
3	Lithuania	3	1	2	229	275	−46	4
4	Israel	3	0	3	244	299	−55	3

Source: FIBA

2 August 2025
13:00

Boxscore

Lithuania	80–91	Belgium
Scoring by quarter: 29–17, 9–21, 16–25, 26–28
Pts: Aukštikalnytė 18; Rebs: Paunksnytė 9 Asts: Aukštikalnytė, Paunksnytė 3		Pts: Devos 18; Rebs: Bruyndoncx 12; Asts: Courthiau 5

Centro de Desportos e Congressos de Matosinhos
Attendance: 45
Referees: Jan Baloun (CZE), Sónia Teixeira (POR), Silvia Marziali (ITA)

2 August 2025
15:30

Boxscore

Israel	69–94	Spain
Scoring by quarter: 17–25, 19–25, 17–23, 16–21
Pts: Raviv 19; Rebs: Nahum 8 Asts: Oren, Raviv 4		Pts: Mata 22; Rebs: Mata 10; Asts: García 7

Centro de Desportos e Congressos de Matosinhos
Attendance: 190
Referees: Jelena Tomić (CRO), Ivana Ivanović (SRB), Anna Belousova (LAT)

3 August 2025
13:00

Boxscore

Belgium	104–80	Israel
Scoring by quarter: 29–19, 20–15, 36–20, 19–26
Pts: Bruyndoncx 19; Rebs: Daelemans 10; Asts: Bevernage 8		Pts: Raviv 15; Rebs: Raviv 7 Asts: Bitan, Raviv 7

Pavilhão Municipal de Guifões
Attendance: 71
Referees: Paulina Gajdosz (POL), Amal Dahra (FRA), Anna Belousova (LAT)

3 August 2025
20:30

Boxscore

Spain	89–48	Lithuania
Scoring by quarter: 29–11, 26–11, 17–16, 17–10
Pts: García 12; Rebs: Tor 9 Asts: Fernández 5		Pts: Aukštikalnytė 14; Rebs: Paunksnytė 6 Asts: Paunksnytė, Kisarauskaitė 3

Pavilhão Municipal de Guifões
Attendance: 70
Referees: Çisil Güngör (TUR), Silvia Marziali (ITA), Gregor Oprčkal (SLO)

4 August 2025
15:30

Boxscore

Lithuania	101–95	Israel
Scoring by quarter: 32–23, 16–30, 22–19, 31–23
Pts: Paunksnytė 43; Rebs: Paunksnytė 9 Asts: Paunksnytė 4		Pts: Raviv 27; Rebs: Nahum 7 Asts: Raviv 7

Centro de Desportos e Congressos de Matosinhos
Attendance: 43
Referees: Veronika Obertová (SVK), Jelena Tomić (CRO), Haris Bijedić (BIH)

4 August 2025
18:00

Boxscore

Spain	77–79	Belgium
Scoring by quarter: 25–29, 20–14, 16–20, 16–16
Pts: Míguez 17; Rebs: Nde 9 Asts: García 4		Pts: Bayart 14; Rebs: Devos 10; Asts: Battiston 5

Pavilhão Municipal de Guifões
Attendance: 150
Referees: Özlem Yalman (TUR), Giacomo Dori (ITA), Diogo Martins (POR)

=== Group B ===
Pos	Team	Pld	W	L	PF	PA	PD	Pts
1	France	3	3	0	263	169	+94	6
2	Slovenia	3	2	1	207	225	−18	5
3	Germany	3	1	2	225	236	−11	4
4	Portugal	3	0	3	180	245	−65	3

Source: FIBA

2 August 2025
18:00

Boxscore

Portugal	50–91	France
Scoring by quarter: 13–19, 12–21, 16–30, 9–21
Pts: Pinheiro 17; Rebs: R. Rodrigues 4 Asts: Pinheiro 2		Pts: Dursus 17; Rebs: four players 5 Asts: N'ganfina 4

Centro de Desportos e Congressos de Matosinhos
Attendance: 1,290
Referees: Özlem Yalman (TUR), Veronika Obertová (SVK), Kirsten Poffé (BEL)

2 August 2025
20:30

Boxscore

Slovenia	84–75	Germany
Scoring by quarter: 25–15, 14–23, 21–20, 24–17
Pts: Sivka 19; Rebs: Brecelj 7 Asts: Sivka 5		Pts: Soltau 17; Rebs: Byvatov, Soltau 6 Asts: Scheu 7

Centro de Desportos e Congressos de Matosinhos
Attendance: 150
Referees: Silvia Marziali (ITA), Giacomo Dori (ITA), Sara Månsson (SWE)

3 August 2025
15:30

Boxscore

France	92–52	Slovenia
Scoring by quarter: 14–12, 30–8, 27–14, 21–18
Pts: Abraham 17; Rebs: Ferré, Djoko 5 Asts: Saulnier 5		Pts: Žibert 11; Rebs: Brecelj 9 Asts: four players 2

Pavilhão Municipal de Guifões
Attendance: 38
Referees: Jelena Tomić (CRO), Jan Baloun (CZE), Milita Stalaučinskaitė (LTU)

3 August 2025
18:00

Boxscore

Germany	83–72	Portugal
Scoring by quarter: 24–12, 18–19, 19–13, 22–28
Pts: Byvatov 15; Rebs: Diala 12; Asts: Scheu 8		Pts: Neto 20; Rebs: Peixinho 7 Asts: Freire, Neto 4

Centro de Desportos e Congressos de Matosinhos
Attendance: 1,180
Referees: Ivana Ivanović (SRB), Nataša Dragojević (MNE), Angel Ivanov (BUL)

4 August 2025
13:00

Boxscore

France	80–67	Germany
Scoring by quarter: 24–13, 28–15, 12–18, 16–21
Pts: Dursus 16; Rebs: Dursus 9 Asts: Salahy 5		Pts: Byvatov 13; Rebs: Englisch 11; Asts: Byvatov 5

Pavilhão Municipal de Guifões
Attendance: 250
Referees: Suzana Vujičić (MNE), Sara Månsson (SWE), Jelena Smiljanić (SRB)

4 August 2025
20:30

Boxscore

Slovenia	71–58	Portugal
Scoring by quarter: 18–16, 20–16, 12–13, 21–13
Pts: Sivka 26; Rebs: Mišjak Cujnik 12; Asts: Žibert 5		Pts: Pinheiro 17; Rebs: Peixinho 8 Asts: Dias 4

Centro de Desportos e Congressos de Matosinhos
Attendance: 1,360
Referees: Esperanza Mendoza (ESP), Paulina Gajdosz (POL), Anna Belousova (LAT)

=== Group C ===
Pos	Team	Pld	W	L	PF	PA	PD	Pts
1	Turkey	3	3	0	242	213	+29	6
2	Sweden	3	2	1	239	225	+14	5
3	Latvia	3	1	2	224	225	−1	4
4	Iceland	3	0	3	232	274	−42	3

Source: FIBA

2 August 2025
15:30

Boxscore

Turkey	72–63	Latvia
Scoring by quarter: 26–14, 15–20, 9–17, 22–12
Pts: İstanbulluoğlu 30; Rebs: İstanbulluoğlu 16; Asts: Akpınar 3		Pts: Brikmane 12; Rebs: Otto 8 Asts: Otto 3

Pavilhão Municipal de Guifões
Attendance: 35
Referees: Paulina Gajdosz (POL), Diogo Martins (POR), Gregor Oprčkal (SLO)

2 August 2025
18:00

Boxscore

Sweden	92–76	Iceland
Scoring by quarter: 29–18, 27–14, 14–9, 22–35
Pts: Trygger 18; Rebs: Da Silva Costa 9 Asts: Levin 6		Pts: Ármannsdóttir 18; Rebs: Boama 10; Asts: Steingrímsdóttir 6

Pavilhão Municipal de Guifões
Attendance: 51
Referees: Esperanza Mendoza (ESP), Sandra Sánchez (ESP), Angel Ivanov (BUL)

3 August 2025
13:00

Boxscore

Latvia	74–80	Sweden
Scoring by quarter: 23–22, 23–10, 13–21, 15–27
Pts: Tomašicka 22; Rebs: Otto 11; Asts: Tomašicka 4		Pts: Da Silva Costa 36; Rebs: Da Silva Costa 16; Asts: Barbosa, Jolinder 4

Centro de Desportos e Congressos de Matosinhos
Attendance: 65
Referees: Sonia Teixeira (POR), Suzana Vujičić (MNE), Jelena Smiljanić (SRB)

3 August 2025
20:30

Boxscore

Iceland	83–95	Turkey
Scoring by quarter: 17–20, 26–23, 16–30, 24–22
Pts: Falsdóttir 20; Rebs: Steingrímsdóttir 8 Asts: Steingrímsdóttir, Boama 3		Pts: Akpınar 22; Rebs: İstanbulluoğlu, Laiç 7 Asts: Güven, Akpınar 6

Centro de Desportos e Congressos de Matosinhos
Attendance: 45
Referees: Veronika Obertová (SVK), Giacomo Dori (ITA), Kirsten Poffé (BEL)

4 August 2025
15:30

Boxscore

Sweden	67–75	Turkey
Scoring by quarter: 18–18, 13–25, 16–14, 20–18
Pts: Trygger 16; Rebs: Trygger 15; Asts: Levin 6		Pts: Akpınar 17; Rebs: İstanbulluoğlu 8 Asts: Güven 4

Pavilhão Municipal de Guifões
Attendance: 120
Referees: Jan Baloun (CZE), Amal Dahra (FRA), Milita Stalaučinskaitė (LTU)

4 August 2025
20:30

Boxscore

Latvia	87–73	Iceland
Scoring by quarter: 18–19, 21–18, 25–17, 23–19
Pts: Tomašicka 29; Rebs: Otto 17; Asts: Šmite 5		Pts: Steingrímsdóttir 14; Rebs: Boama 10; Asts: Steingrímsdóttir 5

Pavilhão Municipal de Guifões
Attendance: 55
Referees: Silvia Marziali (ITA), Sandra Sánchez (ESP), Angel Ivanov (BUL)

=== Group D ===
Pos	Team	Pld	W	L	PF	PA	PD	Pts
1	Netherlands	3	3	0	253	215	+38	6
2	Italy	3	1	2	229	221	+8	4
3	Poland	3	1	2	228	231	−3	4
4	Czechia	3	1	2	195	238	−43	4

Source: FIBA

2 August 2025
13:00

Boxscore

Czechia	60–89	Netherlands
Scoring by quarter: 9–25, 23–21, 12–19, 16–24
Pts: Přibylová, Kytlicová 9 Rebs: Veselá 11; Asts: Brožová 4		Pts: Lieverst 27; Rebs: Bastiaansen, van Vliet 5 Asts: Kleyhorst, van Vliet 4

Pavilhão Municipal de Guifões
Attendance: 70
Referees: Çisil Güngör (TUR), Amal Dahra (FRA), Milita Stalaučinskaitė (LTU)

2 August 2025
20:30

Boxscore

Poland	79–74 (OT)	Italy
Scoring by quarter: 14–15, 24–19, 12–11, 14–19, Overtime: 15–10
Pts: Ułan 22; Rebs: Adamczuk 13; Asts: Kusiak 4		Pts: Osazuwa 19; Rebs: Osazuwa 12; Asts: Zanardi, Baldassarre 5

Pavilhão Municipal de Guifões
Referees: Suzana Vujičić (MNE), Nataša Dragojević (MNE), Çisil Güngör (TUR)

3 August 2025
15:30

Boxscore

Netherlands	85–78	Poland
Scoring by quarter: 26–21, 21–18, 15–21, 23–18
Pts: Stotijn 17; Rebs: de Vries 9 Asts: Stotijn 7		Pts: Ulan 22; Rebs: Rutkowska 19; Asts: three players 3

Centro de Desportos e Congressos de Matosinhos
Attendance: 87
Referees: Esperanza Mendoza (ESP), Haris Bijedić (BIH), Sara Månsson (SWE)

3 August 2025
18:00

Boxscore

Italy	78–63	Czechia
Scoring by quarter: 19–14, 16–14, 18–22, 25–13
Pts: Edokpaigbe 23; Rebs: Zuccon 13; Asts: Zanardi 5		Pts: Přibylová 17; Rebs: Veselá 12; Asts: Brožová 4

Pavilhão Municipal de Guifões
Attendance: 70
Referees: Özlem Yalman (TUR), Diogo Martins (POR), Sandra Sánchez (ESP)

4 August 2025
13:00

Boxscore

Italy	77–79	Netherlands
Scoring by quarter: 10–17, 21–14, 26–27, 20–21
Pts: Osazuwa 31; Rebs: Osazuwa 7 Asts: Zanardi 9		Pts: de Vries 18; Rebs: Douwstra, de Vries 7 Asts: three players 4

Centro de Desportos e Congressos de Matosinhos
Attendance: 83
Referees: Ivana Ivanović (SRB), Nataša Dragojević (MNE), Gregor Oprčkal (SLO)

4 August 2025
18:00

Boxscore

Czechia	72–71	Poland
Scoring by quarter: 24–16, 15–9, 22–15, 11–31
Pts: Válková 16; Rebs: Veselá 11; Asts: Kytlicová 5		Pts: Stasiak 21; Rebs: Rutkowska, Adamczuk 6 Asts: Wysocka 5

Centro de Desportos e Congressos de Matosinhos
Attendance: 40
Referees: Sonia Teixeira (POR), Çisil Güngör (TUR), Kirsten Poffé (BEL)

== Brackets ==
=== Main bracket ===
Round of 16
A1 Belgium	91
B4 Portugal	75
C2 Sweden	92
D3 Poland	86
B2 Slovenia	61
A3 Lithuania	62
D1 Netherlands	74
C4 Iceland	77
A2 Spain	88
B3 Germany	69
C1 Turkey	74
D4 Czechia	64
B1 France	74
A4 Israel	81
D2 Italy	101
C3 Latvia	70

Quarterfinals
A1 Belgium	76
C2 Sweden	77
A3 Lithuania	96
C4 Iceland	76
A2 Spain	77
C1 Turkey	65
A4 Israel	69
D2 Italy	77

Semifinals
C2 Sweden	78
A3 Lithuania	80
A2 Spain	73
D2 Italy	67

Final
A3 Lithuania	50
A2 Spain	102
3rd place match
C2 Sweden	51
D2 Italy	84

=== 5th place bracket ===
5th–8th place semifinals
A1 Belgium	90
C4 Iceland	75
C1 Turkey	78
A4 Israel	80

5th place match
A1 Belgium	96
A4 Israel	73
7th place match
C4 Iceland	65
C1 Turkey	73

=== 9th place bracket ===
9th–16th place quarterfinals
B4 Portugal	47
D3 Poland	68
B2 Slovenia	77
D1 Netherlands	62
B3 Germany	89
D4 Czechia	80
B1 France	87
C3 Latvia (OT)	93

9th–12th place semifinals
D3 Poland	83
B2 Slovenia	73
B3 Germany	59
C3 Latvia	54

9th place match
D3 Poland	58
B3 Germany	84
11th place match
B2 Slovenia	74
C3 Latvia	79

=== 13th place bracket ===
13th–16th place semifinals
B4 Portugal	58
D1 Netherlands	49
D4 Czechia	69
B1 France	94

13th place match
B4 Portugal	65
B1 France	72
15th place match
D1 Netherlands	83
D4 Czechia	60

== Playoff results ==
=== Round of 16 ===
6 August 2025
13:00

Boxscore

Spain	88–69	Germany
Scoring by quarter: 24–12, 21–16, 22–22, 21–19
Pts: Mata 20; Rebs: Nde 11; Asts: Fernández 7		Pts: Byvatov, Soltau 15; Rebs: Manten 8 Asts: Byvatov 3

Pavilhao Municipal de Guiföes
Attendance: 200
Referees: Paulina Gajdosz (POL), Angel Ivanov (BUL), Milita Stalaučinskaitė (LTU)

6 August 2025
13:00

Boxscore

France	74–81	Israel
Scoring by quarter: 12–25, 16–13, 25–23, 21–20
Pts: Bobst 12; Rebs: Djoko, Lutbert 8 Asts: N'ganfina 6		Pts: Raviv 32; Rebs: Bitan 6 Asts: Raviv 5

Centro de Desportos e Congressos de Matosinhos
Attendance: 66
Referees: Çisil Güngör (TUR), Sandra Sánchez (ESP), Jan Baloun (CZE)

6 August 2025
15:30

Boxscore

Turkey	74–64	Czechia
Scoring by quarter: 19–6, 20–22, 19–17, 16–19
Pts: İstanbulluoğlu 23; Rebs: İstanbulluoğlu 11; Asts: Akpınar 6		Pts: Přibylová 22; Rebs: Krausová 7 Asts: Brožová 4

Pavilhao Municipal de Guiföes
Referees: Veronika Obertová (SVK), Jelena Tomić (CRO), Gregor Oprčkal (SLO)

6 August 2025
15:30

Boxscore

Italy	101–70	Latvia
Scoring by quarter: 27–18, 28–15, 24–16, 22–21
Pts: Zanardi 14; Rebs: Gianangeli 9 Asts: Zanardi 8		Pts: Tomašicka 27; Rebs: Otto 12; Asts: Šmite 5

Centro de Desportos e Congressos de Matosinhos
Attendance: 86
Referees: Sónia Teixeira (POR), Haris Bijedić (BIH), Kirsten Poffé (BEL)

6 August 2025
18:00

Boxscore

Slovenia	61–62	Lithuania
Scoring by quarter: 13–18, 17–20, 21–12, 10–12
Pts: Turnšek 29; Rebs: Sivka 12; Asts: Mišjak Cujnik 5		Pts: Aukštikalnytė 23; Rebs: Paunksnytė, Ratavičiūtė 6 Asts: Aukštikalnytė, Matulevičius 3

Pavilhao Municipal de Guiföes
Attendance: 33
Referees: Esperanza Mendoza (ESP), Nataša Dragojević (MNE), Sara Månsson (SWE)

6 August 2025
18:00

Boxscore

Sweden	92–86	Poland
Scoring by quarter: 25–18, 18–18, 24–21, 25–29
Pts: Trygger 31; Rebs: Da Silva Costa 11; Asts: three players 4		Pts: Ullmann 29; Rebs: Rutkowska 8 Asts: Kusiak, Adamczuk 4

Centro de Desportos e Congressos de Matosinhos
Attendance: 65
Referees: Ivana Ivanović (SRB), Silvia Marziali (ITA), Jelena Smiljanić (SRB)

6 August 2025
20:30

Boxscore

Belgium	91–75	Portugal
Scoring by quarter: 25–18, 19–15, 21–25, 26–17
Pts: three players 17; Rebs: Bayart 10; Asts: Daelemans, Bevernage 4		Pts: Neto 22; Rebs: Andorinho 6 Asts: three players 3

Centro de Desportos e Congressos de Matosinhos
Attendance: 1,200
Referees: Özlem Yalman (TUR), Giacomo Dori (ITA), Amal Dahra (FRA)

6 August 2025
20:30

Boxscore

Netherlands	74–77	Iceland
Scoring by quarter: 22–14, 11–20, 29–16, 12–27
Pts: Lieverst 20; Rebs: van Vliet 10; Asts: four players 3		Pts: Wolfram 18; Rebs: Boama 11; Asts: Steingrímsdóttir 4

Pavilhao Municipal de Guiföes
Attendance: 66
Referees: Suzana Vujičić (MNE), Diogo Martins (POR), Anna Belousova (LAT)

=== 9th–16th place quarterfinals ===
7 August 2025
13:00

Boxscore

Germany	89–80	Czechia
Scoring by quarter: 24–22, 16–14, 21–20, 28–24
Pts: Byvatov 24; Rebs: Englisch 9 Asts: Scheu 6		Pts: Přibylová 34; Rebs: Veselá 18; Asts: Brožová 4

Pavilhao Municipal de Guiföes
Attendance: 50
Referees: Jelena Tomić (CRO), Haris Bijedić (BIH), Gregor Oprčkal (SLO)

7 August 2025
15:30

Boxscore

France	87–93 (OT)	Latvia
Scoring by quarter: 23–22, 19–20, 16–15, 19–20, Overtime: 10–16
Pts: Djoko 19; Rebs: Abraham 8 Asts: N'ganfina 5		Pts: Tomašicka 39; Rebs: Otto 8 Asts: Šmite 9

Pavilhao Municipal de Guiföes
Attendance: 90
Referees: Suzana Vujičić (MNE), Diogo Martins (POR), Sara Månsson (SWE)

7 August 2025
18:00

Boxscore

Slovenia	77–62	Netherlands
Scoring by quarter: 17–20, 19–17, 21–13, 20–12
Pts: Grebenc, Sivka 16; Rebs: Sivka 10; Asts: Grebenc, Štirn 6		Pts: de Vries 14; Rebs: van Vliet 7 Asts: Vogelaar 3

Pavilhao Municipal de Guiföes
Attendance: 90
Referees: Çisil Güngör (TUR), Sandra Sánchez (ESP), Angel Ivanov (BUL)

7 August 2025
20:30

Boxscore

Portugal	47–68	Poland
Scoring by quarter: 9–18, 17–14, 12–20, 9–16
Pts: Dias 9 Rebs: R. Rodrigues 7 Asts: Neto 5		Pts: Ułan 29; Rebs: Rutkowska 13; Asts: Adamczuk 5

Pavilhao Municipal de Guiföes
Attendance: 820
Referees: Giacomo Dori (ITA), Jelena Smiljanić (SRB), Kirsten Poffé (BEL)

=== 13th–16th place semifinals ===
9 August 2025
15:30

Boxscore

Czechia	69–94	France
Scoring by quarter: 16–21, 14–28, 25–21, 14–24
Pts: Přibylová 22; Rebs: Kytlicová 6 Asts: Kytlicová 3		Pts: Bobst 18; Rebs: Lutbert 7 Asts: three players 5

Pavilhão Municipal de Guifões
Attendance: 105
Referees: Özlem Yalman (TUR), Haris Bijedić (BIH), Gregor Oprčkal (SLO)

9 August 2025
18:00

Boxscore

Portugal	58–49	Netherlands
Scoring by quarter: 15–15, 18–6, 14–14, 11–14
Pts: Dias 13; Rebs: Peixinho 8 Asts: Freire 3		Pts: Lieverst 17; Rebs: van Vliet 9 Asts: four player 2

Pavilhão Municipal de Guifões
Attendance: 800
Referees: Ivana Ivanović (SRB), Anna Belousova (LAT), Kirsten Poffé (BEL)

==== 15th place match ====
10 August 2025
10:30

Boxscore

Czechia	60–83	Netherlands
Scoring by quarter: 23–16, 14–25, 8–19, 15–23
Pts: Kytlicová 16; Rebs: Stankova 6 Asts: Krausová 4		Pts: Douwstra 18; Rebs: van Vliet 9 Asts: Douwstra 4

Pavilhao Municipal de Guiföes
Attendance: 54
Referees: Haris Bijedić (BIH), Gregor Oprčkal (SLO), Angel Ivanov (BUL)

==== 13th place match ====
10 August 2025
15:30

Boxscore

Portugal	65–72	France
Scoring by quarter: 17–17, 12–24, 19–11, 17–20
Pts: Nazario 14; Rebs: Peixinho 7 Asts: R. Rodrigues 4		Pts: Lutbert 11; Rebs: Abraham, Ounounou 6 Asts: Causeur 5

Centro de Desportos e Congressos de Matosinhos
Attendance: 1,100
Referees: Paulina Gajdosz (POL), Jan Baloun (CZE), Nataša Dragojević (MNE)

=== 9th–12th place semifinals ===
9 August 2025
13:00

Boxscore

Germany	59–54	Latvia
Scoring by quarter: 15–10, 14–14, 15–18, 15–12
Pts: Soltau 15; Rebs: Byvatov 14; Asts: Byvatov 6		Pts: Otto 14; Rebs: Otto 14; Asts: Šmite 5

Pavilhão Municipal de Guifões
Attendance: 40
Referees: Jelena Tomić (CRO), Milita Stalaučinskaitė (LTU), Angel Ivanov (BUL)

9 August 2025
20:30

Boxscore

Poland	83–73	Slovenia
Scoring by quarter: 19–26, 22–15, 23–12, 19–20
Pts: Rutkowska 19; Rebs: Adamczuk 9 Asts: Wysocka 6		Pts: Sivka 18; Rebs: Scekic 9 Asts: Štirn 5

Pavilhão Municipal de Guifões
Attendance: 43
Referees: Jelena Smiljanić (SRB), Sara Månsson (SWE), Diogo Martins (POR)

==== 11th place match ====
10 August 2025
13:00

Boxscore

Slovenia	74–79	Latvia
Scoring by quarter: 16–17, 26–19, 21–14, 11–29
Pts: Sivka 13; Rebs: Sivka, Štirn 6 Asts: Mišjak Cujnik 5		Pts: Otto 25; Rebs: Otto 10; Asts: Smite 5

Pavilhão Municipal de Guiföes
Attendance: 23
Referees: Veronika Obertová (SVK), Amal Dahra (FRA), Sara Månsson (SWE)

==== 9th place match ====
10 August 2025
15:30

Boxscore

Poland	58–84	Germany
Scoring by quarter: 12–15, 12–30, 16–27, 18–12
Pts: Rutkowska 12; Rebs: Rutkowska 11; Asts: seven players 1		Pts: Scheu 16; Rebs: Diala 10; Asts: Scheu 7

Pavilhao Municipal de Guiföes
Attendance: 33
Referees: Özlem Yalman (TUR), Milita Stalaučinskaitė (LTU), Kirsten Poffé (BEL)

=== Championship quarterfinals ===
7 August 2025
13:00

Boxscore

Spain	77–65	Turkey
Scoring by quarter: 21–19, 29–15, 14–15, 13–16
Pts: García 20; Rebs: Nde, Míguez 7 Asts: García 5		Pts: Akpınar 18; Rebs: İstanbulluoğlu 9 Asts: Akpınar 5

Centro de Desportos e Congressos de Matosinhos
Attendance: 124
Referees: Jan Baloun (CZE), Veronika Obertová (SVK), Amal Dahra (FRA)

7 August 2025
15:30

Boxscore

Israel	69–77	Italy
Scoring by quarter: 17–24, 17–22, 23–16, 12–15
Pts: Raviv 25; Rebs: Zilbershlag 8 Asts: Raviv 4		Pts: Edokpaigbe 18; Rebs: Osazuwa 13; Asts: Zanardi 7

Centro de Desportos e Congressos de Matosinhos
Attendance: 76
Referees: Paulina Gajdosz (POL), Sónia Teixeira (POR), Milita Stalaučinskaitė (LTU)

7 August 2025
18:00

Boxscore

Belgium	76–77	Sweden
Scoring by quarter: 28–16, 19–28, 19–16, 10–17
Pts: Courthiau 25; Rebs: Courthiau 7 Asts: Courthiau 4		Pts: Da Silva Costa 15; Rebs: Da Silva Costa 15; Asts: Jolinder 7

Centro de Desportos e Congressos de Matosinhos
Attendance: 120
Referees: Esperanza Mendoza (ESP), Özlem Yalman (TUR), Anna Belousova (LAT)

7 August 2025
20:30

Boxscore

Lithuania	96–76	Iceland
Scoring by quarter: 26–17, 25–20, 32–13, 13–26
Pts: Aukštikalnytė 24; Rebs: Aukštikalnytė, Ratavičiūtė 8 Asts: Aukštikalnytė 6		Pts: Ármannsdóttir 18; Rebs: Ármannsdóttir 9 Asts: Falsdóttir 4

Centro de Desportos e Congressos de Matosinhos
Referees: Ivana Ivanović (SRB), Silvia Marziali (ITA), Nataša Dragojević (MNE)

=== 5th–8th place semifinals ===
9 August 2025
13:00

Boxscore

Belgium	90–75	Iceland
Scoring by quarter: 29–13, 24–20, 23–13, 14–29
Pts: Declercq 15; Rebs: Bayart 9 Asts: Battiston, Courthiau 7		Pts: Ármannsdóttir 21; Rebs: Boama 6 Asts: Falsdóttir, Steingrímsdóttir 3

Centro de Desportos e Congressos de Matosinhos
Attendance: 82
Referees: Esperanza Mendoza (ESP), Sónia Teixeira (POR), Giacomo Dori (ITA)

9 August 2025
15:30

Boxscore

Turkey	78–80	Israel
Scoring by quarter: 19–19, 21–14, 17–27, 21–20
Pts: Akpınar 22; Rebs: İstanbulluoğlu 16; Asts: Akpınar 6		Pts: Raviv 19; Rebs: Bitan 6 Asts: Oren 6

Centro de Desportos e Congressos de Matosinhos
Attendance: 56
Referees: Silvia Marziali (ITA), Sandra Sánchez (ESP), Amal Dahra (FRA)

==== 7th place match ====
10 August 2025
18:00

Boxscore

Iceland	65–73	Turkey
Scoring by quarter: 28–18, 15–22, 8–22, 14–11
Pts: Ármannsdóttir 14; Rebs: Boama 8 Asts: Falsdóttir 4		Pts: Tekin 17; Rebs: İstanbulluoğlu 11; Asts: İstanbulluoğlu 5

Pavilhao Municipal de Guiföes
Attendance: 23
Referees: Jelena Smiljanić (SRB), Anna Belousova (LAT), Giacomo Dori (ITA)

==== 5th place match ====
10 August 2025
13:00

Boxscore

Belgium	96–73	Israel
Scoring by quarter: 26–17, 27–22, 21–19, 22–15
Pts: Courthiau 21; Rebs: Devos 7 Asts: Daelemans, Devos 6		Pts: Raviv 23; Rebs: Kabada 5 Asts: Oren, Raviv 4

Centro de Desportos e Congressos de Matosinhos
Attendance: 69
Referees: Sandra Sánchez (ESP), Suzana Vujičić (MNE), Anna Belousova (LAT)

=== Championship semifinals ===
9 August 2025
18:00

Boxscore

Sweden	78–80 (OT)	Lithuania
Scoring by quarter: 21–19, 12–16, 22–21, 19–18, Overtime: 4–6
Pts: Da Silva Costa 18; Rebs: Trygger 19; Asts: Levin 5		Pts: Paunksnytė 21; Rebs: Paunksnytė 9 Asts: Paunksnytė 4

Centro de Desportos e Congressos de Matosinhos
Attendance: 170
Referees: Paulina Gajdosz (POL), Veronika Obertová (SVK)

9 August 2025
20:30

Boxscore

Spain	73–67	Italy
Scoring by quarter: 25–13, 18–20, 17–13, 13–21
Pts: García 20; Rebs: Míguez 10; Asts: Alberich 4		Pts: Zanardi 15; Rebs: Osazuwa, Zuccon 7 Asts: Zanardi 6

Centro de Desportos e Congressos de Matosinhos
Referees: Çisil Güngör (TUR), Jan Baloun (CZE), Nataša Dragojević (MNE)

==== 3rd place match ====
10 August 2025
18:00

Boxscore

Sweden	51–84	Italy
Scoring by quarter: 14–17, 12–21, 15–21, 10–25
Pts: Trygger 10; Rebs: Trygger 14; Asts: Levin 4		Pts: Edokpaigbe 17; Rebs: Zanardi 7 Asts: Zanardi 6

Centro de Desportos e Congressos de Matosinhos
Attendance: 110
Referees: Esperanza Mendoza (ESP), Ivana Ivanović (SRB), Jelena Tomić (CRO)

==== Final ====
10 August 2025
20:30

Boxscore

Lithuania	50–102	Spain
Scoring by quarter: 19–19, 12–37, 6–24, 13–22
Pts: Paunksnytė 21; Rebs: Kisarauskaitė 6 Asts: Matulevičius 3		Pts: Viegas 17; Rebs: Mata, Nde 9 Asts: García 8

Centro de Desportos e Congressos de Matosinhos
Attendance: 1,300
Referees: Çisil Güngör (TUR), Sónia Teixeira (POR), Silvia Marziali (ITA)

== Final standings ==
Rank	Team	Record
1st place, gold medalist(s)	Spain	6–1
2nd place, silver medalist(s)	Lithuania	4–3
3rd place, bronze medalist(s)	Italy	4–3
4	Sweden	4–3
5	Belgium	6–1
6	Israel	2–5
7	Turkey	5–2
8	Iceland	1–6
9	Germany	4–3
10	Poland	3–4
11	Latvia	3–4
12	Slovenia	3–4
13	France	5–2
14	Portugal	1–6
15	Netherlands	4–3
16	Czechia	1–6

Relegated to the 2026 FIBA U20 Women's EuroBasket Division B
