= Ana Joković =

Serbian basketball player

Personal information
- Born: 16 July 1979 (age 47) Belgrade, SFR Yugoslavia
- Listed height: 1.86 m (6 ft 1 in)

Career information
- WNBA draft: 2001: undrafted
- Playing career: 1993–2009
- Position: Power forward

Career history
- 1993–2001: Crvena zvezda
- 2001–2003: Budućnost Podgorica
- 2003–2004: Crvena zvezda
- 2004–2005: DKSK Miskolc
- 2005–2006: Anda Ramat-Hasharon
- 2006: Crvena zvezda
- 2007: Lotos Gdynia
- 2007–2008: ICIM Arad
- 2008–2009: Vojvodina
- 2009: Mladi Krajišnik

Ana Joković (Serbian Cyrillic: Ана Јоковић; born 16 July 1979) is a former Serbian basketball player who competed for FR Yugoslavia in the 2002 FIBA World Championship for Women.

Sporting positions
New creation	Vice President of the Basketball Federation of Serbia for Women's Basketball; 2011–present	Incumbent
