= 1946 Yugoslav Women's Basketball League =

- League: Yugoslav First League
- Sport: Basketball
- Number of games: 6
- Number of teams: 4

1946
- Season champions: (Socialist Federal Republic of Yugoslavia) Crvena zvezda (1st title)

Yugoslav Women's Basketball League seasons
- ← 1945 1947 →

The 1946 Yugoslav Women's Basketball League is the 2nd season of the Yugoslav Women's Basketball League, the highest professional basketball league in Yugoslavia for women's. Championships is played in 1946 in Belgrade and played four teams. Champion for this season is Crvena zvezda.

== Table ==
Place	Team	Pld	W	L	PF	PA	Diff	Pts	
1.	Crvena zvezda	3	3	0	74	20	+54	6	Champion
2.	Radnički Beograd	3	2	1	62	29	+33	4	
3.	Zadar	3	1	2	22	48	-24	2	
4.	Sloboda Ljubljana	3	0	3	18	79	-61	0	
