= 1953 Yugoslav Women's Basketball League =

- League: Yugoslav First League
- Sport: Basketball
- Number of games: 6
- Number of teams: 4

1953
- Season champions: (Socialist Federal Republic of Yugoslavia) Crvena zvezda (8th title)

Yugoslav Women's Basketball League seasons
- ← 1952 1954 →

The 1953 Yugoslav Women's Basketball League is the 9th season of the Yugoslav Women's Basketball League, the highest professional basketball league in Yugoslavia for women's. Championships is played in 1953 and played four teams. Champion for this season is Crvena zvezda.

== Table ==
Place	Team	Pld	W	L	PF	PA	Diff	Pts	
1.	Crvena zvezda	3	3	0	176	81	+95	6	Champion
2.	Split	3	2	1	132	123	+9	4	
3.	Železničar Ljubljana	3	1	2	103	135	-32	2	
4.	Proleter Zrenjanin	3	0	3	103	175	-72	0	
