= Ljubica Drljača =

Serbian basketball player and coach

Personal information
- Born: 4 August 1978 (age 48) Novi Sad, SFR Yugoslavia
- Listed height: 6 ft 3 in (1.91 m)

Career information
- WNBA draft: 2000: undrafted
- Playing career: –2012
- Position: Small forward / power forward

Career history

Playing
- 1998–2000: Vojvodina
- 2000–2001: Istres
- 2001–2005: Bourges
- 2005–2006: Saint-Amand PH
- 2006–2009: ESB Villeneuve-d'Ascq
- 2009–2010: Valencia
- 2011: Umbertide
- 2011–2012: Tarbes

Coaching
- 2013–present: ESB Villeneuve-d'Ascq (assistant)
- 2014–2017: Serbia U20 (assistant)

Ljubica Drljača (Serbian Cyrillic: Љубица Дрљача; born 4 August 1978) is a Serbian basketball coach and former basketball player. She plays small forward position and power forward.
