= 2025 FIBA U20 Women's EuroBasket Division B =

International youth basketball tournament

Tournament details
- Host country: Hungary
- City: Miskolc
- Dates: 2–10 August 2025
- Teams: 14 (from 1 confederation)
- Venues: 2 (in 1 host city)

Final positions
- Champions: Hungary (1st title)
- Runners-up: Serbia
- Third place: Croatia

Tournament statistics
- Games played: 47
- Attendance: 9,458 (201 per game)
- MVP: (Serbia) Jovana Jevtović
- Top scorer: (Republic of Ireland) Isabel Sullivan (142 Pts) (23.7 ppg)

Official website
- www.fiba.basketball

The 2025 FIBA U20 Women's EuroBasket Division B was the 19th edition of the Division B of the European basketball championship for women's under-20 national teams. The tournament was played in Miskolc, Hungary, from 2 to 10 August 2025.

== Participating teams ==
- Relegated from the 2024 FIBA U20 Women's EuroBasket Division A: (The bottom three teams in the final standings were relegated) (Note: Finland, who finished in 16th place and were relegated from Division A, did not enter this edition.)
  - Hungary ▼ (14th place)
  - Serbia ▼ (15th place)
- Returning Teams: (These teams remained in Division B after the 2024 edition) (Note: Iceland, which finished 4th in Division B, was promoted to Division A following Montenegro's withdrawal. Austria was the only team to have competed in the 2024 edition but did not enter this edition.)
  - Ireland (5th place)
  - Ukraine (6th place)
  - Great Britain (7th place)
  - Croatia (8th place)
  - Greece (9th place)
  - Bulgaria (10th place)
  - Switzerland (11th place)
  - Slovakia (12th place)
  - Romania (13th place)
  - Albania (15th place)
- New Entrants: (Teams that did not participate in the 2024 edition)
  - Denmark – last participated in 2018
  - Malta – debut appearance

== First round ==
The draw of the first round was held on 28 January 2025 in Freising, Germany.

In the first round, the teams were drawn into four groups. The first two teams from each group will advance to the Qualifying round; the other teams will advance to the 9th–14th place classification group.

All times are local (Central European Summer Time; UTC+2).

=== Group A ===
Pos	Team	Pld	W	L	PF	PA	PD	Pts	Qualification
1	Serbia	3	3	0	290	138	+152	6	Qualifying round
2	Bulgaria	3	2	1	268	187	+81	5	Qualifying round
3	Denmark	3	1	2	184	232	−48	4	9th–14th place classification
4	Albania	3	0	3	109	294	−185	3	9th–14th place classification

Source: FIBA

2 August 2025
15:00

Boxscore

Albania	45–78	Denmark
Scoring by quarter: 13–26, 8–19, 7–21, 17–12
Pts: Bokrina 14; Rebs: Hykaj 6 Asts: Hykaj 5		Pts: Moller, Borges-Michaelsen 16; Rebs: Borges-Michaelsen, Lutterodt 12; Asts: Vennekilde, Christoffersen 4

DVTK Arena
Attendance: 30
Referees: Ciprian Stoica (ROU), Ewa Matuszewska (POL), Tamara Harutyunyan (ARM)

2 August 2025
17:30

Boxscore

Bulgaria	67–88	Serbia
Scoring by quarter: 9–23, 20–22, 18–19, 20–24
Pts: Manolova 16; Rebs: Tsekova 9 Asts: Boneva 4		Pts: Jevtović 23; Rebs: Jevtović 18; Asts: Ćosović 6

DVTK Arena
Attendance: 30
Referees: Zdenko Zubak (SVK), Bogna Podkowinska (POL), Márton Makrai (HUN)

3 August 2025
15:00

Boxscore

Serbia	116–22	Albania
Scoring by quarter: 24–8, 32–2, 29–2, 31–10
Pts: Ćosović 17; Rebs: Milanović 9 Asts: Nestorov 6		Pts: Danaj 8 Rebs: Mucenji 4 Asts: Bokrina 2

University of Miskolc Sports Hall
Attendance: 25
Referees: Emma Perry (IRL), Ivana Panov (MNE), Eirini Tsantali (GRE)

3 August 2025
20:00

Boxscore

Denmark	57–101	Bulgaria
Scoring by quarter: 17–34, 16–20, 14–26, 10–21
Pts: Lutterodt 14; Rebs: Lutterodt 7 Asts: Gandrup 4		Pts: Karamfilova 19; Rebs: Karamfilova 7 Asts: Stambolyan, Boneva 7

University of Miskolc Sports Hall
Attendance: 50
Referees: Oleksandr Dotsenko (UKR), Amar Djekovic (KOS), Marina Shalamberidze (GEO)

4 August 2025
20:00

Boxscore

Serbia	86–49	Denmark
Scoring by quarter: 19–12, 28–13, 20–11, 19–13
Pts: Nestorov 18; Rebs: Jevtović 10; Asts: Đikanović 5		Pts: Vennekilde, Christensen 8 Rebs: Lutterodt 9 Asts: Vennekilde, Lutterodt 3

DVTK Arena
Attendance: 50
Referees: Josip Mikulić (CRO), Dumitru Stasiev (MDA), Alexandra Iurii (MDA)

4 August 2025
20:00

Boxscore

Albania	42–100	Bulgaria
Scoring by quarter: 7–29, 16–15, 7–39, 12–17
Pts: Bokrina 12; Rebs: Hykaj 5 Asts: Danaj, Disha 1		Pts: Karamfilova 18; Rebs: Krasteva 15; Asts: Madankova 10

University of Miskolc Sports Hall
Attendance: 30
Referees: Ivana Panov (MNE), Joana Pessoa (POR), Marina Shalamberidze (GEO)

=== Group B ===
Pos	Team	Pld	W	L	PF	PA	PD	Pts	Qualification
1	Ireland	2	2	0	127	119	+8	4	Qualifying round
2	Ukraine	2	1	1	141	124	+17	3	Qualifying round
3	Great Britain	2	0	2	105	130	−25	2	9th–14th place classification

Source: FIBA

2 August 2025
20:00

Boxscore

Great Britain	53–74	Ukraine
Scoring by quarter: 14–24, 10–15, 14–19, 15–16
Pts: Forster, Jacobs Abiola 13; Rebs: Jacobs Abiola 8 Asts: Sharpe, Wright 4		Pts: Tupalo 23; Rebs: Tupalo 11; Asts: Lavrinets 4

DVTK Arena
Attendance: 50
Referees: Josip Mikulić (CRO), Amar Djekovic (KOS), Joana Pessoa (POR)

3 August 2025
17:30

Boxscore

Ukraine	67–71	Ireland
Scoring by quarter: 12–24, 18–14, 21–9, 16–24
Pts: Tupalo 14; Rebs: Syniakova 7 Asts: Lavrinets 5		Pts: Sullivan, Prenter 27; Rebs: Sullivan 11; Asts: Sullivan, Prenter 4

University of Miskolc Sports Hall
Attendance: 110
Referees: Ciprian Stoica (ROU), Einars Tukiss (LAT), Ewa Matuszewska (POL)

4 August 2025
15:00

Boxscore

Ireland	56–52	Great Britain
Scoring by quarter: 15–7, 18–10, 9–21, 14–14
Pts: Sullivan 24; Rebs: Dunne 9 Asts: Prenter 3		Pts: Archer 15; Rebs: Jacobs Abiola 11; Asts: McGhee 6

DVTK Arena
Attendance: 100
Referees: Radomir Vojinovic (MNE), Amar Djekovic (KOS), Monika Mincheva (BUL)

=== Group C ===
Pos	Team	Pld	W	L	PF	PA	PD	Pts	Qualification
1	Croatia	3	3	0	279	182	+97	6	Qualifying round
2	Greece	3	2	1	239	198	+41	5	Qualifying round
3	Switzerland	3	1	2	197	225	−28	4	9th–14th place classification
4	Malta	3	0	3	124	234	−110	3	9th–14th place classification

Source: FIBA

2 August 2025
17:30

Boxscore

Croatia	96–34	Malta
Scoring by quarter: 22–14, 29–6, 25–2, 20–12
Pts: Valčić 16; Rebs: Vukosa 11; Asts: Bešlić 9		Pts: Galea 17; Rebs: Galea 9 Asts: Saliba 4

University of Miskolc Sports Hall
Attendance: 25
Referees: Einars Tukiss (LAT), Emma Perry (IRL), Alexandra Iurii (MDA)

2 August 2025
20:00

Boxscore

Switzerland	65–85	Greece
Scoring by quarter: 26–12, 10–20, 8–36, 21–17
Pts: Popovic 23; Rebs: Popovic 5 Asts: Hulliger 6		Pts: Stoligka 21; Rebs: Sioumoureki, Tampakou 7 Asts: Stoligka, Kofina 5

University of Miskolc Sports Hall
Attendance: 50
Referees: Nemanja Vlahovic (SRB), Ivana Panov (MNE), Marina Shalamberidze (GEO)

3 August 2025
15:00

Boxscore

Malta	44–57	Switzerland
Scoring by quarter: 8–6, 16–18, 15–19, 5–14
Pts: Galea 20; Rebs: Galea 9 Asts: Fenech 3		Pts: Matic 19; Rebs: Popovic 11; Asts: Popovic 5

DVTK Arena
Attendance: 23
Referees: Zdenko Zubak (SVK), Monika Mincheva (BUL), Joana Pessoa (POR)

3 August 2025
20:00

Boxscore

Greece	73–87	Croatia
Scoring by quarter: 24–14, 15–22, 18–29, 16–22
Pts: Stoligka 20; Rebs: Papazoglou 7 Asts: six players 2		Pts: Božan 20; Rebs: Bešlić 11; Asts: Bešlić 9

DVTK Arena
Attendance: 30
Referees: Radomir Vojinovic (MNE), Edison Gjoni (ALB), Bogna Podkowinska (POL)

4 August 2025
15:00

Boxscore

Greece	81–46	Malta
Scoring by quarter: 28–8, 23–10, 13–8, 17–20
Pts: Sioumoureki 14; Rebs: Sioumoureki 9 Asts: Kofina 8		Pts: Baldacchino 8 Rebs: Abela 9 Asts: Sciberras, Riolo 2

University of Miskolc Sports Hall
Attendance: 50
Referees: Nemanja Vlahovic (SRB), Marton Makrai (HUN), Tamara Harutyunyan (ARM)

4 August 2025
17:30

Boxscore

Croatia	96–75	Switzerland
Scoring by quarter: 27–25, 25–14, 16–25, 28–11
Pts: Novak 23; Rebs: Božan 9 Asts: Bešlić 10		Pts: Hulliger 15; Rebs: Matic, Konate 10; Asts: Popovic 5

University of Miskolc Sports Hall
Attendance: 30
Referees: Ciprian Stoica (ROU), Einars Tukiss (LAT), Oleksandr Dotsenko (UKR)

=== Group D ===
Pos	Team	Pld	W	L	PF	PA	PD	Pts	Qualification
1	Hungary	2	2	0	139	90	+49	4	Qualifying round
2	Slovakia	2	1	1	128	133	−5	3	Qualifying round
3	Romania	2	0	2	98	142	−44	2	9th–14th place classification

Source: FIBA

2 August 2025
15:00

Boxscore

Slovakia	72–64	Romania
Scoring by quarter: 12–14, 16–11, 23–16, 21–23
Pts: Chovaníková 16; Rebs: Štefančová 7 Asts: Nigutová 5		Pts: Panait 31; Rebs: Bara Nemeth 6 Asts: David 5

University of Miskolc Sports Hall
Attendance: 100
Referees: Radomir Vojinovic (MNE), Edison Gjoni (ALB), Oleksandr Dotsenko (UKR)

3 August 2025
17:30

Boxscore

Romania	34–70	Hungary
Scoring by quarter: 15–24, 0–17, 9–16, 10–13
Pts: David 6 Rebs: Fritea, Bara Nemeth 4 Asts: three players 2		Pts: P. Toman 13; Rebs: Strausz 9 Asts: P. Toman 7

DVTK Arena
Attendance: 1,500
Referees: Josip Mikulić (CRO), Nemanja Vlahovic (SRB), Dumitru Stasiev (MDA)

4 August 2025
17:30

Boxscore

Hungary	69–56	Slovakia
Scoring by quarter: 15–9, 17–12, 17–14, 20–21
Pts: Strausz 13; Rebs: P. Toman 9 Asts: D. Toman 4		Pts: Molnárová 13; Rebs: Chovaníková 6 Asts: Ďuratná, Štefančová 2

DVTK Arena
Attendance: 800
Referees: Emma Perry (IRL), Bogna Podkowinska (POL), Eirini Margarita Tsantali (GRE)

== 9th–14th place classification ==
Pos	Team	Pld	W	L	PF	PA	PD	Pts
9	Switzerland	5	5	0	336	225	+111	10
10	Denmark	5	4	1	338	280	+58	9
11	Romania	5	3	2	360	269	+91	8
12	Great Britain	5	2	3	323	278	+45	7
13	Albania	5	1	4	216	386	−170	6
14	Malta	5	0	5	226	361	−135	5

Source: FIBA

5 August 2025
17:30

Boxscore

Great Britain	33–61	Romania
Scoring by quarter: 11–20, 8–18, 11–7, 3–16
Pts: Forster 10; Rebs: Jacobs Abiola 8 Asts: Forster 3		Pts: Fritea 18; Rebs: Fritea, Bara Nemeth 7 Asts: David 8

University of Miskolc Sports Hall
Attendance: 60
Referees: Einars Tukiss (LAT), Edison Gjoni (ALB), Alexandra Iurii (MDA)

6 August 2025
15:00

Boxscore

Albania	50–46	Malta
Scoring by quarter: 19–12, 9–7, 10–8, 12–19
Pts: Angjelakidhu 16; Rebs: three players 4 Asts: Bokrina 4		Pts: Riolo 12; Rebs: Abela, S. Fenech Pace 13; Asts: Saliba, Riolo 2

University of Miskolc Sports Hall
Attendance: 30
Referees: Oleksandr Dotsenko (UKR), Josip Mikulić (CRO), Alexandra Iurii (MDA)

6 August 2025
17:30

Boxscore

Switzerland	61–36	Romania
Scoring by quarter: 23–15, 15–9, 11–1, 12–11
Pts: Konate 17; Rebs: Matic, Konate 9 Asts: Vincenzi 5		Pts: Fritea 8 Rebs: Fritea, Bara Nemeth 5 Asts: David 3

University of Miskolc Sports Hall
Attendance: 25
Referees: Bogna Podkowinska (POL), Marina Shalamberidze (GEO), Eirini Tsantali (GRE)

6 August 2025
20:00

Boxscore

Denmark	69–55	Great Britain
Scoring by quarter: 15–13, 12–17, 22–10, 20–15
Pts: Christensen 21; Rebs: three players 9 Asts: Borges-Michaelsen 4		Pts: McGhee 11; Rebs: Jacobs Abiola 6 Asts: Forster 5

University of Miskolc Sports Hall
Attendance: 28
Referees: Ivana Panov (MNE), Marton Makrai (HUN), Joana Pessoa (POR)

7 August 2025
15:00

Boxscore

Romania	90–43	Albania
Scoring by quarter: 32–8, 19–12, 24–10, 15–13
Pts: Bara Nemeth 18; Rebs: Bara Nemeth 15; Asts: David 7		Pts: Musaja 11; Rebs: Mucenji 7 Asts: Alushi 4

University of Miskolc Sports Hall
Attendance: 30
Referees: Nemanja Vlahovic (SRB), Joana Pessoa (POR), Marton Makrai (HUN)

7 August 2025
17:30

Boxscore

Great Britain	57–74	Switzerland
Scoring by quarter: 11–21, 12–21, 25–17, 9–15
Pts: Forster 17; Rebs: Jacobs Abiola 7 Asts: McGhee 4		Pts: Matic 17; Rebs: Matic 12; Asts: Hulliger, Matic 5

University of Miskolc Sports Hall
Attendance: 31
Referees: Emma Perry (IRL), Dumitru Stasiev (MDA), Alexandra Iurii (MDA)

7 August 2025
20:00

Boxscore

Denmark	67–44	Malta
Scoring by quarter: 20–13, 14–10, 16–15, 17–6
Pts: Lutterodt 15; Rebs: Schiott 13; Asts: Moller 4		Pts: Riolo 15; Rebs: Abela 10; Asts: Saliba 3

University of Miskolc Sports Hall
Attendance: 25
Referees: Zdenko Zubak (SVK), Eirini Margarita Tsantali (GRE), Tamara Harutyunyan (ARM)

9 August 2025
15:00

Boxscore

Denmark	51–68	Switzerland
Scoring by quarter: 12–12, 9–25, 18–19, 12–12
Pts: Borges-Michaelsen 13; Rebs: Lutterodt 9 Asts: Gandrup, Lutterodt 3		Pts: Popovic 15; Rebs: Konate 9 Asts: Vincenzi 6

University of Miskolc Sports Hall
Attendance: 25
Referees: Ewa Matuszewska (POL), Eirini Tsantali (GRE), Marina Shalamberidze (GEO)

9 August 2025
17:30

Boxscore

Great Britain	96–41	Albania
Scoring by quarter: 22–8, 24–12, 23–9, 27–12
Pts: Forster 25; Rebs: Jacobs Abiola 13; Asts: McGhee, Wilson-Osuide 6		Pts: Mucenji 9 Rebs: three players 4 Asts: Danaj, Hykaj 2

University of Miskolc Sports Hall
Attendance: 15
Referees: Zdenko Zubak (SVK), Monika Mincheva (BUL), Tamara Harutyunyan (ARM)

9 August 2025
20:00

Boxscore

Romania	105–59	Malta
Scoring by quarter: 25–12, 22–18, 26–15, 32–14
Pts: Belegante 23; Rebs: Bara Nemeth 12; Asts: David 14		Pts: S. Fenech 20; Rebs: Riolo 5 Asts: Saliba 4

University of Miskolc Sports Hall
Attendance: 20
Referees: Emma Perry (IRL), Amar Djekovic (KOS), Alexandra Iurii (MDA)

10 August 2025
11:30

Boxscore

Great Britain	82–33	Malta
Scoring by quarter: 22–13, 11–11, 19–7, 30–2
Pts: Forster 28; Rebs: Jacobs Abiola 17; Asts: McGhee 5		Pts: Riolo 10; Rebs: S. Fenech Pace 6 Asts: R. Fenech Pace 2

University of Miskolc Sports Hall
Attendance: 20
Referees: Dumitru Stasiev (MDA), Alexandra Iurii (MDA), Amar Djekovic (KOS)

10 August 2025
14:00

Boxscore

Denmark	73–68	Romania
Scoring by quarter: 19–23, 29–13, 15–19, 10–13
Pts: Borges-Michaelsen 25; Rebs: Borges-Michaelsen 10; Asts: Borges-Michaelsen 4		Pts: David 18; Rebs: Puscasu 6 Asts: Bara Nemeth 6

University of Miskolc Sports Hall
Attendance: 30
Referees: Monika Mincheva (BUL), Eirini Tsantali (GRE), Marina Shalamberidze (GEO)

10 August 2025
16:30

Boxscore

Switzerland	76–37	Albania
Scoring by quarter: 15–4, 15–7, 17–11, 29–15
Pts: Krummenacher 14; Rebs: Katsikaris 10; Asts: Balunga, Hulliger 5		Pts: Mucenji 13; Rebs: Danaj, Musaja 5 Asts: Toska 3

University of Miskolc Sports Hall
Attendance: 10
Referees: Ewa Matuszewska (POL), Nemanja Vlahović (SRB), Tamara Harutyunyan (ARM)

== Qualifying round ==
=== Group E ===
Pos	Team	Pld	W	L	PF	PA	PD	Pts	Qualification
1	Serbia	3	3	0	266	163	+103	6	Semifinals
2	Bulgaria	3	2	1	216	218	−2	5	Semifinals
3	Ireland	3	1	2	180	230	−50	4	5th–8th place playoffs
4	Ukraine	3	0	3	184	235	−51	3	5th–8th place playoffs

Source: FIBA

6 August 2025
13:00

Boxscore

Ireland	70–83	Bulgaria
Scoring by quarter: 18–19, 17–9, 17–22, 18–33
Pts: Sullivan 26; Rebs: Walshe 9 Asts: Prenter 6		Pts: Manolova 31; Rebs: Karamfilova 13; Asts: Dimitrova 5

DVTK Arena
Attendance: 40
Referees: Ciprian Stoica (ROU), Ewa Matuszewska (POL), Tamara Harutyunyan (ARM)

6 August 2025
15:30

Boxscore

Serbia	98–57	Ukraine
Scoring by quarter: 19–16, 22–9, 25–20, 32–12
Pts: Jevtović, Milanović 15; Rebs: Milanović 8 Asts: Nestorov 8		Pts: Syniakova 15; Rebs: Syniakova 8 Asts: Lavrinets 4

DVTK Arena
Attendance: 50
Referees: Zdenko Zubak (SVK), Einars Tukiss (LAT), Dumitru Stasiev (MDA)

7 August 2025
13:00

Boxscore

Serbia	80–39	Ireland
Scoring by quarter: 16–9, 9–9, 29–9, 26–12
Pts: Jevtović 13; Rebs: Jevtović 14; Asts: Nestorov 10		Pts: Prenter 9 Rebs: O'Sullivan 6 Asts: Gloeckner 3

DVTK Arena
Attendance: 50
Referees: Radomir Vojinovic (MNE), Monika Mincheva (BUL), Bogna Podkowinska (POL)

7 August 2025
20:30

Boxscore

Bulgaria	66–60	Ukraine
Scoring by quarter: 19–9, 16–17, 16–14, 15–20
Pts: Boneva 26; Rebs: Karamfilova 12; Asts: Madankova 7		Pts: Syniakova 17; Rebs: Syniakova 7 Asts: Lavrinets, Tykha 4

DVTK Arena
Attendance: 30
Referees: Josip Mikulić (CRO), Edison Gjoni (ALB), Amar Djekovic (KOS)

=== Group F ===
Pos	Team	Pld	W	L	PF	PA	PD	Pts	Qualification
1	Hungary	3	3	0	208	167	+41	6	Semifinals
2	Croatia	3	2	1	219	206	+13	5	Semifinals
3	Slovakia	3	1	2	198	205	−7	4	5th–8th place playoffs
4	Greece	3	0	3	188	235	−47	3	5th–8th place playoffs

Source: FIBA

6 August 2025
18:00

Boxscore

Hungary	67–49	Greece
Scoring by quarter: 19–9, 13–10, 18–15, 17–15
Pts: Ács 15; Rebs: Strausz 10; Asts: Rátkai 6		Pts: Stoligka 14; Rebs: Tampakou 10; Asts: Pantoti 5

DVTK Arena
Attendance: 1,000
Referees: Radomir Vojinovic (MNE), Edison Gjoni (ALB), Monika Mincheva (BUL)

6 August 2025
20:30

Boxscore

Croatia	70–61	Slovakia
Scoring by quarter: 20–15, 24–11, 14–9, 12–26
Pts: Božan 17; Rebs: Bešlić 9 Asts: Bešlić 8		Pts: Maliarová 12; Rebs: Šedivá 11; Asts: four players 3

DVTK Arena
Attendance: 45
Referees: Emma Perry (IRL), Nemanja Vlahovic (SRB), Amar Djekovic (KOS)

7 August 2025
15:30

Boxscore

Greece	66–81	Slovakia
Scoring by quarter: 18–17, 6–21, 25–23, 17–20
Pts: Paraskevopoulou 23; Rebs: Paraskevopoulou 10; Asts: Stoligka, Kofina 4		Pts: Šedivá 17; Rebs: Šedivá, Štefančová 10; Asts: Ďuratná 5

DVTK Arena
Attendance: 30
Referees: Einars Tukiss (LAT), Ewa Matuszewska (POL), Marina Shalamberidze (GEO)

7 August 2025
18:00

Boxscore

Croatia	62–72	Hungary
Scoring by quarter: 15–15, 21–21, 13–19, 13–17
Pts: Novak 19; Rebs: Božan 9 Asts: Bešlić 5		Pts: Aho 17; Rebs: Aho 7 Asts: Aho 5

DVTK Arena
Attendance: 750
Referees: Ciprian Stoica (ROU), Oleksandr Dotsenko (UKR), Ivana Panov (MNE)

== 5th–8th place playoffs ==
5th–8th place semifinals
9 August
E3 Ireland	63
F4 Greece	67
9 August
F3 Slovakia	56
E4 Ukraine	42

5th place match
10 August
Greece	54
Slovakia	68
7th place match
10 August
Ireland	66
Ukraine	58

=== 5th–8th place semifinals ===
9 August 2025
13:00

Boxscore

Ireland	63–67	Greece
Scoring by quarter: 19–19, 16–16, 14–11, 14–21
Pts: Sullivan 24; Rebs: Dunne 7 Asts: Prenter 7		Pts: Papazoglou 14; Rebs: Paraskevopoulou 16; Asts: Kofina 8

DVTK Arena
Attendance: 41
Referees: Einars Tukiss (LAT), Ivana Panov (MNE), Dumitru Stasiev (MDA)

9 August 2025
15:30

Boxscore

Slovakia	56–42	Ukraine
Scoring by quarter: 7–10, 18–8, 15–9, 16–15
Pts: Molnárová 18; Rebs: Šedivá 15; Asts: Štefančová 4		Pts: three players 10; Rebs: Syniakova 5 Asts: Lavrinets, Kutsenko 2

DVTK Arena
Attendance: 50
Referees: Josip Mikulić (CRO), Marton Makrai (HUN), Joana Pessoa (POR)

=== 7th place match ===
10 August 2025
11:30

Boxscore

Ireland	66–58	Ukraine
Scoring by quarter: 14–10, 16–19, 21–14, 15–15
Pts: Sullivan 33; Rebs: Walshe 10; Asts: Prenter, O'Sullivan 4		Pts: Kutsenko 18; Rebs: Syniakova 11; Asts: Tykha 5

DVTK Arena
Attendance: 50
Referees: Zdenko Zubak (SVK), Josip Mikulić (CRO), Ivana Panov (MNE)

=== 5th place match ===
10 August 2025
14:00

Boxscore

Greece	54–68	Slovakia
Scoring by quarter: 10–10, 19–31, 18–9, 7–18
Pts: Paraskevopoulou 12; Rebs: Paraskevopoulou, Tampakou 10; Asts: Paraskevopoulou, Tampakou 3		Pts: Šedivá 12; Rebs: Štefančová 7 Asts: Szmereková 5

DVTK Arena
Attendance: 40
Referees: Oleksandr Dotsenko (UKR), Joana Pessoa (POR), Marton Makrai (HUN)

== Championship playoffs ==
Semifinals
9 August
E1 Serbia	79
F2 Croatia	58
9 August
F1 Hungary	67
E2 Bulgaria	55

Final
10 August
Serbia	44
Hungary	71
3rd place match
10 August
Croatia	82
Bulgaria	78

=== Semifinals ===
9 August 2025
18:00

Boxscore

Hungary	67–55	Bulgaria
Scoring by quarter: 14–21, 13–6, 24–17, 16–11
Pts: Aho 16; Rebs: Strausz 8 Asts: Rátkai, D. Toman 5		Pts: Manolova 20; Rebs: Karamfilova 11; Asts: three players 3

DVTK Arena
Attendance: 1,500
Referees: Nemanja Vlahovic (SRB), Edison Gjoni (ALB), Bogna Podkowinska (POL)

9 August 2025
20:30

Boxscore

Serbia	79–58	Croatia
Scoring by quarter: 22–18, 25–12, 10–11, 22–17
Pts: Jevtović 23; Rebs: Jevtović 8 Asts: Nestorov 8		Pts: Vukoša 18; Rebs: Bešlić, Vukoša 7 Asts: Bešlić 8

DVTK Arena
Attendance: 50
Referees: Radomir Vojinovic (MNE), Ciprian Stoica (ROU), Oleksandr Dotsenko (UKR)

=== 3rd place match ===
10 August 2025
16:30

Boxscore

Croatia	82–78	Bulgaria
Scoring by quarter: 23–24, 26–22, 21–15, 12–17
Pts: Vukoša 35; Rebs: Vukoša 22; Asts: Međugorac 5		Pts: Madankova 17; Rebs: Karamfilova 12; Asts: Boneva 8

DVTK Arena
Attendance: 100
Referees: Radomir Vojinović (MNE), Einars Tukiss (LAT), Edison Gjoni (ALB)

=== Final ===
10 August 2025
19:00

Boxscore

Serbia	44–71	Hungary
Scoring by quarter: 7–8, 13–13, 11–17, 13–33
Pts: Jevtović 23; Rebs: Jevtović 6 Asts: three players 2		Pts: P. Toman 15; Rebs: Strausz 8 Asts: Rátkai, Aho 4

DVTK Arena
Attendance: 2,200
Referees: Ciprian Stoica (ROU), Emma Perry (IRL), Bogna Podkowinska (POL)

== Final standings ==
Rank	Team	Record
1st place, gold medalist(s)	Hungary	6–0
2nd place, silver medalist(s)	Serbia	6–1
3rd place, bronze medalist(s)	Croatia	5–2
4	Bulgaria	4–3
5	Slovakia	4–2
6	Greece	3–4
7	Ireland	3–3
8	Ukraine	1–5
9	Switzerland	5–2
10	Denmark	4–3
11	Romania	3–4
12	Great Britain	2–5
13	Albania	1–6
14	Malta	0–7

Promoted to the 2026 FIBA U20 Women's EuroBasket Division A

== Statistics and awards ==
=== Statistical leaders ===
==== Players ====
Points

Name	PPG
(Republic of Ireland) Isabel Sullivan	23.7
(Serbia) Jovana Jevtović	16.3
(Bulgaria) Denitsa Manolova	16.3
(United Kingdom) Olivia Forster	16.0
(Republic of Ireland) Grace Prenter	15.7

Blocks

Name	BPG
(Romania) Sara Nicole Fritea	2.4
(Bulgaria) Yana Karamfilova	1.7
(Hungary) Eliza Fárbás	1.5
(Croatia) Olivia Vukoša	1.3
(Greece) Ioulia Kerasoviti	1.3
(Hungary) Heléna Dobó	1.3

Rebounds

Name	RPG
(Serbia) Jovana Jevtović	10.0
(United Kingdom) Felicia Jacobs Abiola	10.0
(Bulgaria) Yana Karamfilova	9.3
(Croatia) Olivia Vukoša	9.1
(Greece) Aristea Paraskevopoulou	8.3

Steals

Name	SPG
(Romania) Ioana David	3.3
(Romania) Beata Bara Nemeth	3.0
(Serbia) Minja Aranđelović	2.9
(Switzerland) Marta Vincenzi	2.7
(Ukraine) Serafyma Tykha	2.7

Assists

Name	APG
(Croatia) Lana Bešlić	7.6
(Romania) Ioana David	6.3
(Serbia) Daria Nestorov	5.6
(Bulgaria) Ivana Boneva	5.0
(Bulgaria) Gergana Madankova	4.3
(Greece) Eleni Kofina	4.3

Efficiency

Name	EFFPG
(Serbia) Jovana Jevtović	23.4
(Bulgaria) Yana Karamfilova	22.0
(Croatia) Olivia Vukoša	20.7
(Bulgaria) Denitsa Manolova	17.7
(Bulgaria) Ivana Boneva	15.7

==== Teams ====
Points

Name	PPG
Serbia	84.4
Croatia	78.7
Bulgaria	78.6
Hungary	69.3
Switzerland	68.0

Blocks

Name	BPG
Hungary	8.0
Bulgaria	4.6
Romania	4.3
Croatia	3.7
Greece	3.3

Rebounds

Name	RPG
Denmark	47.7
Croatia	47.4
Great Britain	46.1
Serbia	45.9
Greece	45.3

Steals

Name	SPG
Serbia	15.6
Switzerland	14.3
Bulgaria	13.6
Ukraine	13.3
Romania	12.1

Assists

Name	APG
Serbia	21.3
Croatia	20.6
Bulgaria	19.7
Switzerland	19.1
Hungary	19.0

Efficiency

Name	EFFPG
Serbia	106.9
Croatia	94.7
Bulgaria	90.4
Hungary	89.8
Switzerland	74.6

=== Awards ===
The awards were announced on 10 August 2025.

Award	Player
All-Tournament Team	(Serbia) Jovana Jevtović
All-Tournament Team	(Hungary) Tyra Aho
All-Tournament Team	(Hungary) Petra Toman
All-Tournament Team	(Bulgaria) Denitsa Manolova
All-Tournament Team	(Croatia) Petra Božan
Most Valuable Player	(Serbia) Jovana Jevtović
