= Zorica Đurković =

Yugoslav basketball player

Zorica Ðurković
Personal information
- Born: 14 September 1957 (age 69) Dubrovnik, PR Croatia, FPR Yugoslavia
- Listed height: 1.72 m (5 ft 8 in)
- Listed weight: 62 kg (137 lb)

Career information
- Playing career: 1972–19??
- Position: Shooting guard

Career history
- 1972-19??: Crvena zvezda

Career highlights
- No. 12 honored by Crvena zvezda
Medals
Women's basketball
Representing Yugoslavia
Olympic Games
Bronze medal – third place	1980 Moskva	Team competition
EuroBasket
Silver medal – second place	1978 Poznan	Team competition
Bronze medal – third place	1980 Banja Luka	Team competition

Zorica Ðurković (born 14 September 1957) is a former basketball player who competed for Yugoslavia in the 1980 Summer Olympics.
