= 1952 Yugoslav Women's Basketball League =

1952Yugoslav Women's Basketball League
- League: Yugoslav First League
- Sport: Basketball
- Number of games: 6
- Number of teams: 4

1952
- Season champions: (Socialist Federal Republic of Yugoslavia) Crvena zvezda (7th title)

Yugoslav Women's Basketball League seasons
- ← 1951 1953 →

The 1952 Yugoslav Women's Basketball League is the 8th season of the Yugoslav Women's Basketball League, the highest professional basketball league in Yugoslavia for women's. Championships is played in 1952 and played four teams. Champion for this season is Crvena zvezda.

== Table ==
Place	Team	Pld	W	L	PF	PA	Diff	Pts	
1.	Crvena zvezda	3	3	0	108	65	+43	6	Champion
2.	Lokomotiva Zagreb	3	2	1	114	95	+19	4	
3.	Proleter Zrenjanin	3	1	2	85	106	-21	2	
4.	Split	3	0	3	73	114	-41	0	
