= 1949 Yugoslav Women's Basketball League =

- League: Yugoslav First League
- Sport: Basketball
- Number of games: 16
- Number of teams: 8

1949
- Season champions: (Socialist Federal Republic of Yugoslavia) Crvena zvezda (4th title)

Yugoslav Women's Basketball League seasons
- ← 1948 1950 →

The 1949 Yugoslav Women's Basketball League is the 5th season of the Yugoslav Women's Basketball League, the highest professional basketball league in Yugoslavia for women's. Championships is played in 1949 in Belgrade and played eight teams. Champion for this season is Crvena zvezda.

== Regular season ==
=== Group A ===
Place	Team	Pld	W	L	PF	PA	Diff	Pts
1.	Crvena zvezda	3	3	0	170	47	+123	6
2.	Naprijed Zagreb	3	2	1	91	91	0	4
3.	Enotnost Ljubljana	3	1	2	79	133	-54	2
4.	Polet Zagreb	3	0	3	46	192	-146	0

=== Group B ===
Place	Team	Pld	W	L	PF	PA	Diff	Pts
1.	Proleter Zrenjanin	3	2	1	144	60	+84	4
2.	Hajduk Split	3	2	1	120	62	+58	4
3.	Jedinstvo Zagreb	3	2	1	92	70	+22	4
4.	Vardar Skoplje	3	0	3	27	191	-164	0

== Play Off ==
club 1	result	club 2
for 7th place
Polet Zagreb	30:18	Vardar Skoplje
for 5th place
Jedinstvo Zagreb	28:14	Enotnost Ljubljana
for 3rd place
Hajduk Split	41:28	Naprijed Zagreb
for 1st place
Crvena zvezda	34:11	Proleter Zrenjanin
