= Elif İstanbulluoğlu =

Turkish basketball player (born 2005)

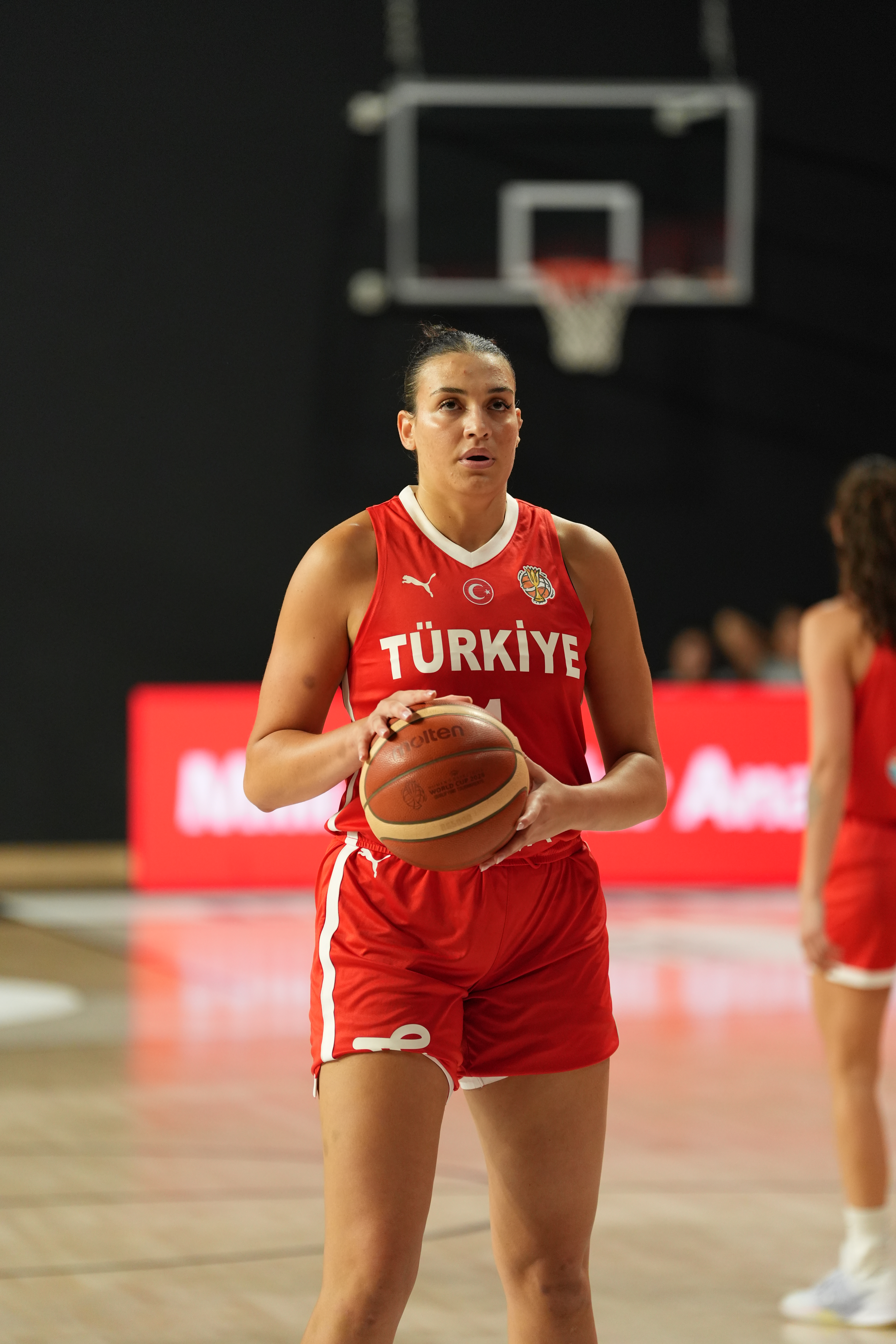
- İstanbulluoğlu with Turkey national team in August 2026

No. 11 – Louisville Cardinals
- Position: Power forward

Personal information
- Born: April 4, 2005 (age 21)
- Listed height: 6 ft 3 in (1.91 m)

Career information
- College: Louisville (2023–present)
- Playing career: 2021–present

Career history
- 2021–2023: Fenerbahçe

Career highlights
- EuroLeague champion (2023); 2× Turkish Super League champion (2022, 2023)

Elif İstanbulluoğlu (born April 4, 2005) is a Turkish professional basketball player who currently plays for the Louisville Cardinals of the Atlantic Coast Conference. She also represents the Turkish national team in international competition. Standing at 6 ft 3 in (1.91 m), she plays at the power forward position.

== Early life ==
İstanbulluoğlu was born on April 4, 2005, in Istanbul, Turkey, to Serkan and Aslı İstanbulluoğlu, both of whom played professional basketball in Turkey. She has an older sister, Şevval, who played college basketball for the Siena Saints.

== College ==
İstanbulluoğlu played college basketball for the Louisville Cardinals. She joined the team for the 2023–24 season and appeared in all 34 games, making 2 starts. She recorded her first collegiate double-double with 10 points and 12 rebounds against the Bellarmine Knights. and made her first career start against the Georgia Tech Yellow Jackets.

In the 2024–25 season, she played in all 33 games and averaged 3.0 points and 2.0 rebounds per game.

In the 2025–26 season, İstanbulluoğlu started all 36 games and averaged 10.1 points, 5.1 rebounds and 26.6 minutes per game. She scored in double figures 17 times and recorded her second career double-double with 18 points and 11 rebounds against the Alabama Crimson Tide in the NCAA Tournament. She recorded a career-high 23 points against the Miami Hurricanes and 14 rebounds against the Tennessee Lady Volunteers.

== Club career ==
İstanbulluoğlu played for Fenerbahçe in the Turkish Super League, before joining Louisville. She was part of the club's 2022–23 squad that won the EuroLeague Women title.

== International career ==
İstanbulluoğlu represented Turkey at the 2023 FIBA Under-18 and Under-20 European Championships. At the Under-18 tournament, she averaged 11.0 points and 10.7 rebounds per game, while at the Under-20 tournament she averaged 10.7 points.

In 2024, she averaged 16.3 points and 6.6 rebounds at the 2024 FIBA U20 Women's EuroBasket and was named one of the players who impressed by FIBA.

In 2025, İstanbulluoğlu made her senior national team debut at the EuroBasket Women 2025, where Turkey finished seventh. She also played at the 2025 FIBA U20 Women's EuroBasket, averaging 17.9 points and 11.1 rebounds per game. FIBA named her one of the tournament's players who lit up the competition.

She was named to Turkey's roster for the 2026 FIBA World Cup.

== Career statistics ==
Legend
GP	Games played	GS	Games started	MPG	Minutes per game	RPG	Rebounds per game
APG	Assists per game	SPG	Steals per game	BPG	Blocks per game	PPG	Points per game
TO	Turnovers per game	FG%	Field-goal percentage	3P%	3-point field-goal percentage	FT%	Free-throw percentage
**Bold**	Career best	°	League leader

=== EuroLeague ===
†	Won a EuroLeague championship

EuroLeague statistics
Year	Team	GP	GS	MPG	FG%	3P%	FT%	RPG	APG	SPG	BPG	TO	PPG
2022–23^{†}	(Turkey) Fenerbahçe	4	0	2.6	.000	.000	—	0.5	0	0.3	0	0	0

=== College ===
NCAA statistics
Year	Team	GP	GS	MPG	FG%	3P%	FT%	RPG	APG	SPG	BPG	TO	PPG
2023–24	Louisville	34	2	12.7	.374	.222	.667	2.2	0.4	0.1	0.2	**0.9**	2.6
2024–25	Louisville	33	0	12.9	.442	.125	.524	2.0	0.5	0.3	0	0.9	3.0
2025–26	Louisville	**36**	**36**	**26.6**	**.504**	**.345**	**.696**	**5.1**	**1.7**	**0.8**	**0.2**	1.4	**10.1**
Career		103	38	17.7	.466	.283	.658	3.2	0.9	0.4	0.1	1.1	5.3
