= 1945 Yugoslav Women's Basketball League =

- League: Yugoslav First League
- Sport: Basketball

1945
- Season champions: (Socialist Federal Republic of Yugoslavia) SR Serbia

Yugoslav Women's Basketball League seasons
- 1946 →

The 1945 Yugoslav Women's Basketball League is the 1st season of the Yugoslav Women's Basketball League, the highest professional basketball league in Yugoslavia for women. Championships is played in 1945 in Subotica and played two teams. Champion for this season is national team of SR Serbia.

== Result ==
club 1	result	club 2
final
SR Serbia	27:14	SR Croatia
