= Serbia and Montenegro women's national under-20 basketball team =

Basketball team

Serbia and Montenegro
- FIBA zone: FIBA Europe
- National federation: Basketball Federation of Serbia and Montenegro

U20 European Championship
- Appearances: None

U20 European Championship Division B
- Appearances: 1
- Medals: Silver: 1 (2006)

The Serbia and Montenegro women's national under-20 basketball team was a national basketball team of Serbia and Montenegro, administered by the Basketball Federation of Serbia and Montenegro. It represented the country in women's international under-20 basketball competitions. The team won a silver medal at the 2006 FIBA Europe Under-20 Championship for Women Division B.
