= 2007 FIBA Europe Under-20 Championship for Women =

2007 FIBA U20 Women's European Championship
6th FIBA Under-20 Women's European Basketball Championship

Tournament details
- Host country: Bulgaria
- Dates: 13–22 July 2007
- Teams: 16
- Venues: 2 (in 1 host city)

Final positions
- Champions: Spain (1st title)

Official website
- www.fibaeurope.com

The 2007 FIBA Europe Under-20 Championship for Women was the sixth edition of the Women's European basketball championship for national under-20 teams. It was held in Sofia, Bulgaria, from 13 to 22 July 2007. Spain women's national under-20 basketball team won the tournament and became the European champions for the first time.

== Participating teams ==
- Belarus ▲ (Winners, 2006 FIBA Europe Under-20 Championship for Women Division B)
- Belgium
- Bulgaria
- Czech Republic
- France
- Germany
- Greece
- Hungary
- Israel
- Italy
- Latvia
- Russia
- Serbia ▲ (Runners-up, 2006 FIBA Europe Under-20 Championship for Women Division B as Serbia and Montenegro)
- Spain
- Turkey
- Ukraine

== First round ==
In the first round, the teams were drawn into four groups of four. The first three teams from each group advance to the quarterfinal round, the last teams will play in the classification round for 13th–16th place.

=== Group A ===
Pos	Team	Pld	W	L	PF	PA	PD	Pts	Qualification
1	Spain	3	3	0	219	186	+33	6	Quarterfinal round
2	Russia	3	2	1	237	190	+47	5	Quarterfinal round
3	Greece	3	1	2	173	196	−23	4	Quarterfinal round
4	Israel	3	0	3	190	247	−57	3	Classification round for 13th–16th place

Source: FIBA Archive

13 July 2007

Boxscore

Greece	73–54	Israel

13 July 2007

Boxscore

Spain	72–68	Russia

14 July 2007

Boxscore

Russia	75–53	Greece

14 July 2007

Boxscore

Israel	71–80	Spain

15 July 2007

Boxscore

Greece	47–67	Spain

15 July 2007

Boxscore

Russia	94–65	Israel

=== Group B ===
Pos	Team	Pld	W	L	PF	PA	PD	Pts	Qualification
1	Serbia	3	3	0	251	182	+69	6	Quarterfinal round
2	Belgium	3	2	1	206	217	−11	5	Quarterfinal round
3	Belarus	3	1	2	206	190	+16	4	Quarterfinal round
4	Hungary	3	0	3	171	245	−74	3	Classification round for 13th–16th place

Source: FIBA Archive

13 July 2007

Boxscore

Belgium	68–63	Belarus

13 July 2007

Boxscore

Serbia	83–63	Hungary

14 July 2007

Boxscore

Hungary	68–76	Belgium

14 July 2007

Boxscore

Belarus	57–82	Serbia

15 July 2007

Boxscore

Belgium	62–86	Serbia

15 July 2007

Boxscore

Hungary	40–86	Belarus

=== Group C ===
Pos	Team	Pld	W	L	PF	PA	PD	Pts	Qualification
1	Turkey	3	2	1	225	215	+10	5	Quarterfinal round
2	Latvia	3	2	1	221	211	+10	5	Quarterfinal round
3	Italy	3	2	1	235	202	+33	5	Quarterfinal round
4	Czech Republic	3	0	3	219	272	−53	3	Classification round for 13th–16th place

Source: FIBA Archive

13 July 2007

Boxscore

Italy	71–65	Latvia

13 July 2007

Boxscore

Czech Republic	80–87	Turkey

14 July 2007

Boxscore

Turkey	64–55	Italy

14 July 2007

Boxscore

Latvia	76–66	Czech Republic

15 July 2007

Boxscore

Italy	109–73	Czech Republic

15 July 2007

Boxscore

Turkey	74–80	Latvia

=== Group D ===
Pos	Team	Pld	W	L	PF	PA	PD	Pts	Qualification
1	France	3	3	0	238	195	+43	6	Quarterfinal round
2	Germany	3	2	1	210	217	−7	5	Quarterfinal round
3	Bulgaria	3	1	2	193	197	−4	4	Quarterfinal round
4	Ukraine	3	0	3	221	253	−32	3	Classification round for 13th–16th place

Source: FIBA Archive

13 July 2007

Boxscore

Bulgaria	81–69	Ukraine

13 July 2007

Boxscore

France	83–65	Germany

14 July 2007

Boxscore

Germany	64–55	Bulgaria

14 July 2007

Boxscore

Ukraine	73–91	France

15 July 2007

Boxscore

Bulgaria	57–64	France

15 July 2007

Boxscore

Germany	81–79	Ukraine

== Quarterfinal round ==
In this round, the teams play in two groups of six. The first two teams from each group advance to the semifinals, the third and fourth teams advance to the 5th–8th place playoffs, the other teams will play in the 9th–12th place playoffs.

=== Group E ===
Pos	Team	Pld	W	L	PF	PA	PD	Pts	Qualification
1	Spain	5	5	0	370	291	+79	10	Semifinals
2	Serbia	5	4	1	415	319	+96	9	Semifinals
3	Russia	5	3	2	359	343	+16	8	5th–8th place playoffs
4	Belgium	5	2	3	295	359	−64	7	5th–8th place playoffs
5	Belarus	5	1	4	308	343	−35	6	9th–12th place playoffs
6	Greece	5	0	5	256	348	−92	5	9th–12th place playoffs

Source: FIBA Archive

17 July 2007

Boxscore

Belgium	64–73	Russia

17 July 2007

Boxscore

Belarus	56–68	Spain

17 July 2007

Boxscore

Serbia	78–47	Greece

18 July 2007

Boxscore

Greece	56–71	Belarus

18 July 2007

Boxscore

Spain	84–44	Belgium

18 July 2007

Boxscore

Russia	74–93	Serbia

19 July 2007

Boxscore

Belgium	57–53	Greece

19 July 2007

Boxscore

Belarus	61–69	Russia

19 July 2007

Boxscore

Serbia	76–79	Spain

=== Group F ===
Pos	Team	Pld	W	L	PF	PA	PD	Pts	Qualification
1	France	5	5	0	354	303	+51	10	Semifinals
2	Turkey	5	3	2	362	353	+9	8	Semifinals
3	Germany	5	2	3	322	338	−16	7	5th–8th place playoffs
4	Italy	5	2	3	321	322	−1	7	5th–8th place playoffs
5	Latvia	5	2	3	315	331	−16	7	9th–12th place playoffs
6	Bulgaria	5	1	4	309	336	−27	6	9th–12th place playoffs

Source: FIBA Archive

17 July 2007

Boxscore

Germany	51–52	Latvia

17 July 2007

Boxscore

Bulgaria	67–68	Turkey

17 July 2007

Boxscore

France	61–51	Italy

18 July 2007

Boxscore

Italy	82–65	Bulgaria

18 July 2007

Boxscore

Turkey	86–75	Germany

18 July 2007

Boxscore

Latvia	60–70	France

19 July 2007

Boxscore

Germany	67–62	Italy

19 July 2007

Boxscore

Bulgaria	65–58	Latvia

19 July 2007

Boxscore

France	76–70	Turkey

== Classification round for 13th–16th place ==
=== Group G ===
Pos	Team	Pld	W	L	PF	PA	PD	Pts
13	Ukraine	3	3	0	276	224	+52	6
14	Czech Republic	3	2	1	230	216	+14	5
15	Israel	3	1	2	237	245	−8	4
16	Hungary	3	0	3	192	250	−58	3

Source: FIBA Archive

17 July 2007

Boxscore

Israel	88–92	Ukraine

17 July 2007

Boxscore

Hungary	61–72	Czech Republic

19 July 2007

Boxscore

Czech Republic	80–67	Israel

19 July 2007

Boxscore

Ukraine	96–58	Hungary

21 July 2007

Boxscore

Israel	82–73	Hungary

21 July 2007

Boxscore

Czech Republic	78–88	Ukraine

== 9th–12th place playoffs ==
9th–12th place semifinals
E5	Belarus	74
F6	Bulgaria	76
F5	Latvia	64
E6	Greece	71

9th place match
F6	Bulgaria	62
E6	Greece	60
11th place match
E5	Belarus	68
F5	Latvia	56

=== 9th–12th place semifinals ===
21 July 2007

Boxscore

Belarus	74–76	Bulgaria

21 July 2007

Boxscore

Latvia	64–71	Greece

=== 11th place match ===
22 July 2007

Boxscore

Belarus	68–56	Latvia

=== 9th place match ===
22 July 2007

Boxscore

Bulgaria	62–60	Greece

== 5th–8th place playoffs ==
5th–8th place semifinals
E3	Russia	69
F4	Italy	83
F3	Germany	72
E4	Belgium	76

5th place match
F4	Italy	75
E4	Belgium	78
7th place match
E3	Russia	78
F3	Germany	52

=== 5th–8th place semifinals ===
21 July 2007

Boxscore

Russia	69–83	Italy

21 July 2007

Boxscore

Germany	72–76	Belgium

=== 7th place match ===
22 July 2007

Boxscore

Russia	78–52	Germany

=== 5th place match ===
22 July 2007

Boxscore

Italy	75–78	Belgium

== Championship playoffs ==
Semifinals
E1	Spain	78
F2	Turkey	66
F1	France	64
E2	Serbia	76

Finals
E1	Spain	75
E2	Serbia	60
3rd place match
F2	Turkey	63
F1	France	65

=== Semifinals ===
21 July 2007

Boxscore

Spain	78–66	Turkey

21 July 2007

Boxscore

France	64–76	Serbia

=== 3rd place match ===
22 July 2007

Boxscore

Turkey	63–65	France

=== Final ===
22 July 2007

Boxscore

Spain	75–60	Serbia

== Final standings ==
Team relegated to the 2008 FIBA Europe Under-20 Championship for Women Division B

Rank	Team
1st place, gold medalist(s)	Spain
2nd place, silver medalist(s)	Serbia
3rd place, bronze medalist(s)	France
4	Turkey
5	Belgium
6	Italy
7	Russia
8	Germany
9	Bulgaria
10	Greece
11	Belarus
12	Latvia
13	Ukraine
14	Czech Republic
15	Israel
16	Hungary
