= Serbian women's university basketball team =

Medal record

Women's basketball

Representing Serbia and Montenegro / Serbia

Universiade
Silver medal – second place	2005 İzmir	

The Serbian women's university basketball team (Serbian: Женска универзитетска кошаркашка репрезентација Србије / Ženska univerzitetska košarkaška reprezentacija Srbije) represents Serbia at the Summer Universiade and is controlled by the Basketball Federation of Serbia, the governing body for basketball in Serbia.
