= Sofija Pekić =

Yugoslav basketball player

Personal information
- Born: 15 February 1953 (age 73) Lovćenac, PR Serbia, FPR Yugoslavia
- Listed height: 1.84 m (6 ft 0 in)
- Listed weight: 75 kg (165 lb)
- Position: Center

Career history
- Crvena zvezda

Career highlights
- No. 15 honored by Crvena zvezda
Medals
Women's basketball
Representing Yugoslavia
Bronze medal – third place	1980 Moskva	Team competition
EuroBasket
Silver medal – second place	1978 Poznan	Team competition
Bronze medal – third place	1980 Banja Luka	Team competition

Sofija Pekić (born 15 February 1953, in Lovćenac) is a former basketball player who competed for Yugoslavia in the 1980 Summer Olympics.

She has played in Yugoslav National Basketball Team. Unofficially, she was proclaimed as the best female player at the Moscow Olympic Games in 1980 by some journalists. She has also played a few years in Pescara's team "Varta" in Italy.
