= Cmiljka Kalušević =

Yugoslavian Basketball player

Personal information
- Born: April 9, 1933 Ivanjica, Kingdom of Yugoslavia
- Died: 13 September 1989 (aged 56) Belgrade, SFR Yugoslavia
- Position: Center

Career history
- Crvena zvezda

Cmiljka Kalušević, (Serbian Cyrillic: Цмиљка Калушевић; April 9, 1933 in Tarragona, Spain - 1989 in Belgrade, SFR Yugoslavia) is a former Yugoslav and Serbian female basketball player and athlete.
