= Vukica Mitić =

Serbian basketball player (1953–2019)

Personal information
- Born: 7 December 1953 Belgrade, PR Serbia, FPR Yugoslavia
- Died: 27 June 2019 (aged 65) Belgrade, Serbia
- Listed height: 1.70 m (5 ft 7 in)
- Listed weight: 56 kg (123 lb)
- Position: Point guard
- Number: 8

Career history
- Crvena zvezda
Medals
Women's basketball
Representing Yugoslavia
Bronze medal – third place	1980 Moskva	Team competition
EuroBasket
Silver medal – second place	1978 Poznan	Team competition
Bronze medal – third place	1980 Banja Luka	Team competition

Vukica Mitić (Serbian Cyrillic: Вукица Митић, 7 December 1953 – 27 June 2019) was a Serbian basketball player. She represented the Yugoslavia national team internationally.

== Career achievements and awards ==
- FIBA Women's European Champions Cup winner: 1 (with Crvena zvezda: 1978–79).
- Yugoslav League champion: 7 (with Crvena zvezda: 1972–73, 1975–76, 1976–77, 1977–78, 1978–79, 1979–80, 1980–81)
- Yugoslav Cup winner: 5 (with Crvena zvezda: 1972–73, 1973–74, 1975–76, 1978–79, 1980–81)
- No. 8 honored by Crvena zvezda
