= Vera Ðurašković =

Yugoslavian basketball player

Personal information
- Born: 29 August 1949 (age 77)
- Listed height: 1.72 m (5 ft 8 in)
- Listed weight: 63 kg (139 lb)
- Position: Shooting guard

Career history
- Bosna
Medals
Women's basketball
Representing Yugoslavia
Olympic Games
Bronze medal – third place	1980 Moskva	Team competition

Vera Ðurašković (née Čerečina, born 29 August 1949) is a former basketball player who competed for Yugoslavia in the 1980 Summer Olympics.
