= Snežana Zorić =

Yugoslavian and Serbian basketball player

Snežana Zorić Mijalković
Personal information
- Born: 16 January 1949 (age 77) Belgrade, SFR Yugoslavia

Career information
- Playing career: 1964–1976
- Position: Shooting guard

Career history
- 1964–1976: Crvena zvezda

Career highlights
- No. 12 honored by Crvena zvezda
Medals
Women's basketball
Representing Yugoslavia
EuroBasket Women
Bronze medal – third place	1970 Netherlands	Team
European U18 Championship
Silver medal – second place	1965 Bulgaria	Team

Snežana Zorić, married Mijalković, (Serbian: Снежана Зорић; born 16 January 1949) is former Yugoslavian and Serbian basketball player.
