= Marija Veger =

Serbian and Yugoslavian basketball player

Personal information
- Born: December 26, 1947 (age 78) Novi Sad, FPR Yugoslavia

Career information
- Playing career: 1964–1978

Career history
- Vojvodina
- Geas Basket

Career highlights
- 2x Yugoslav League champion (1969, 1970); 3x EuroBasket Women top scorer (1968, 1970, 1976)
Medals
Women's basketball
Representing Yugoslavia
EuroBasket Women
Silver medal – second place	1968 Messina	Team
Silver medal – second place	1978 Poland	Team
Bronze medal – third place	1970 Rotterdam	Team

Marija Veger Demšar (Serbian Cyrillic: Марија Вегер Демшар; born December 26, 1947, in Novi Sad, SFR Yugoslavia) is a Serbian and Yugoslavian former female basketball player.

== Personal life ==
Veger was married to Ladislav Demšar (1929–1992), Yugoslav basketball player and coach.
