= 2026 FIBA U20 Women's EuroBasket Division B =

International youth basketball tournament

Tournament details
- Host country: Bulgaria
- City: Samokov
- Dates: 4–12 July 2026
- Teams: 14 (from 1 confederation)
- Venues: 2 (in 1 host city)

Final positions
- Champions: Portugal (1st title)
- Runners-up: Greece
- Third place: Montenegro

Tournament statistics
- Games played: 47
- MVP: (Portugal) Clara Silva
- Top scorer: (Bosnia and Herzegovina) Marija Damjanović (19.4 ppg)

Official website
- www.fiba.basketball

The 2026 FIBA U20 Women's EuroBasket Division B was the 20th edition of the Division B of the European basketball championship for women's under-20 national teams. The tournament was played in Samokov, Bulgaria, from 4 to 12 July 2026.

Portugal secured their first Division B title with a victory over Greece in the final, 78–43.

== Participating teams ==
- Relegated from the 2025 FIBA U20 Women's EuroBasket Division A: (The bottom three teams in the final standings were relegated)
  - Portugal ▼ (14th place)
  - Netherlands ▼ (15th place)
  - Czech Republic ▼ (16th place)
- Returning teams: (These teams remained in Division B after the 2025 edition) (Note: Denmark, Great Britain, Malta: These teams competed in the 2025 edition but did not enter this edition.)
  - Bulgaria (4th place)
  - Slovakia (5th place)
  - Greece (6th place)
  - Ireland (7th place)
  - Ukraine (8th place)
  - Switzerland (9th place)
  - Romania (11th place)
  - Albania (13th place)
- New entrants: (Teams that did not participate in the 2025 edition)
  - Azerbaijan – debut appearance
  - Bosnia and Herzegovina – last participated in 2017 Division A / 2015 Division B
  - Montenegro – last participated in 2024 Division A / 2022 Division B

== First round ==
The draw of the first round was held on 5 February 2026 in Freising, Germany.

In the first round, the teams were drawn into four groups. The first two teams from each group advanced to the Qualifying round; the other teams were dropped to the 9th–14th place classification group.

All times are local (Eastern European Summer Time; UTC+3).

=== Group A ===
Pos	Team	Pld	W	L	PF	PA	PD	Pts	Qualification
1	Greece	3	3	0	253	168	+85	6	Qualifying round
2	Ireland	3	2	1	267	193	+74	5	Qualifying round
3	Azerbaijan	3	1	2	232	232	0	4	9th–14th place classification
4	Albania	3	0	3	147	306	−159	3	9th–14th place classification

Source: FIBA

4 July 2026
15:15

Boxscore

Albania	43–106	Greece
Scoring by quarter: 6–26, 13–28, 15–23, 9–29

Triumph Hall, Samokov

4 July 2026
15:30

Boxscore

Ireland	93–81	Azerbaijan
Scoring by quarter: 23–20, 24–19, 24–19, 22–23

Arena SamElyon, Samokov

5 July 2026
20:15

Boxscore

Azerbaijan	88–60	Albania
Scoring by quarter: 22–15, 25–10, 14–19, 27–16

Triumph Hall, Samokov

5 July 2026
20:30

Boxscore

Greece	68–62	Ireland
Scoring by quarter: 16–13, 15–14, 14–22, 23–13

Arena SamElyon, Samokov

6 July 2026
17:45

Boxscore

Greece	79–63	Azerbaijan
Scoring by quarter: 26–18, 12–11, 28–16, 13–18

Triumph Hall, Samokov

6 July 2026
20:30

Boxscore

Ireland	112–44	Albania
Scoring by quarter: 25–17, 36–13, 26–6, 25–8

Arena SamElyon, Samokov

=== Group B ===
Pos	Team	Pld	W	L	PF	PA	PD	Pts	Qualification
1	Slovakia	2	2	0	141	121	+20	4	Qualifying round
2	Czech Republic	2	1	1	143	134	+9	3	Qualifying round
3	Ukraine	2	0	2	121	150	−29	2	9th–14th place classification

Source: FIBA

4 July 2026
20:30

Boxscore

Czech Republic	79–64	Ukraine
Scoring by quarter: 28–22, 23–11, 16–18, 12–13

Arena SamElyon, Samokov

5 July 2026
17:45

Boxscore

Ukraine	57–71	Slovakia
Scoring by quarter: 11–19, 12–9, 13–23, 21–20

Triumph Hall, Samokov

6 July 2026
15:30

Boxscore

Slovakia	70–64	Czech Republic
Scoring by quarter: 13–17, 16–16, 19–22, 22–9

Arena SamElyon, Samokov

=== Group C ===
Pos	Team	Pld	W	L	PF	PA	PD	Pts	Qualification
1	Bulgaria (H)	3	3	0	254	188	+66	6	Qualifying round
2	Netherlands	3	2	1	250	196	+54	5	Qualifying round
3	Romania	3	1	2	213	216	−3	4	9th–14th place classification
4	Bosnia and Herzegovina	3	0	3	169	286	−117	3	9th–14th place classification

Source: FIBA
(H) Hosts

4 July 2026
18:00

Boxscore

Romania	56–86	Bulgaria
Scoring by quarter: 2–26, 12–29, 23–16, 19–15

Arena SamElyon, Samokov

4 July 2026
20:15

Boxscore

Netherlands	107–50	Bosnia and Herzegovina
Scoring by quarter: 23–12, 24–20, 38–11, 22–7

Triumph Hall, Samokov

5 July 2026
15:15

Boxscore

Bosnia and Herzegovina	59–90	Romania
Scoring by quarter: 9–21, 15–27, 21–18, 14–24

Triumph Hall, Samokov

5 July 2026
18:00

Boxscore

Bulgaria	79–72	Netherlands
Scoring by quarter: 22–12, 27–23, 14–12, 16–25

Arena SamElyon, Samokov

6 July 2026
18:00

Boxscore

Bulgaria	89–60	Bosnia and Herzegovina
Scoring by quarter: 28–10, 12–21, 23–10, 26–19

Arena SamElyon, Samokov

6 July 2026
20:15

Boxscore

Netherlands	71–67	Romania
Scoring by quarter: 17–21, 17–18, 21–17, 16–11

Triumph Hall, Samokov

=== Group D ===
Pos	Team	Pld	W	L	PF	PA	PD	Pts	Qualification
1	Portugal	2	2	0	142	90	+52	4	Qualifying round
2	Montenegro	2	1	1	140	125	+15	3	Qualifying round
3	Switzerland	2	0	2	89	156	−67	2	9th–14th place classification

Source: FIBA

4 July 2026
17:45

Boxscore

Portugal	71–55	Montenegro
Scoring by quarter: 20–14, 11–19, 19–18, 21–4

Triumph Hall, Samokov

5 July 2026
15:30

Boxscore

Montenegro	85–54	Switzerland
Scoring by quarter: 17–10, 17–14, 24–15, 27–15

Arena SamElyon, Samokov

6 July 2026
15:15

Boxscore

Switzerland	35–71	Portugal
Scoring by quarter: 12–23, 4–19, 8–12, 11–17

Triumph Hall, Samokov

== 9th–14th place classification ==
Pos	Team	Pld	W	L	PF	PA	PD	Pts
9	Ukraine	5	5	0	430	276	+154	10
10	Switzerland	5	4	1	374	260	+114	9
11	Azerbaijan	5	3	2	341	323	+18	8
12	Romania	5	2	3	303	356	−53	7
13	Bosnia and Herzegovina	5	1	4	339	414	−75	6
14	Albania	5	0	5	283	441	−158	5

Source: FIBA

Note: The following matches were carried over from the first round: AZE v. ALB 88–60 and BIH v. ROU 59–90.

7 July 2026
18:00

Boxscore

Ukraine	73–53	Switzerland
Scoring by quarter: 22–13, 19–17, 13–11, 19–12

Triumph Hall, Samokov

8 July 2026
15:15

Boxscore

Azerbaijan	58–79	Ukraine
Scoring by quarter: 17–21, 14–21, 13–16, 14–21

Triumph Hall, Samokov

8 July 2026
17:45

Boxscore

Romania	33–80	Switzerland
Scoring by quarter: 13–21, 6–19, 5–18, 9–22

Triumph Hall, Samokov

8 July 2026
20:15

Boxscore

Albania	66–88	Bosnia and Herzegovina
Scoring by quarter: 14–28, 14–20, 23–17, 15–23

Triumph Hall, Samokov

9 July 2026
15:15

Boxscore

Ukraine	81–57	Romania
Scoring by quarter: 21–23, 22–9, 18–11, 20–14

Triumph Hall, Samokov

9 July 2026
17:45

Boxscore

Switzerland	97–42	Albania
Scoring by quarter: 31–4, 13–11, 32–13, 21–14

Triumph Hall, Samokov

9 July 2026
20:15

Boxscore

Azerbaijan	75–71	Bosnia and Herzegovina
Scoring by quarter: 34–11, 19–21, 14–24, 8–15

Triumph Hall, Samokov

11 July 2026
15:15

Boxscore

Azerbaijan	64–50	Romania
Scoring by quarter: 16–9, 18–13, 12–10, 18–18

Triumph Hall, Samokov

11 July 2026
17:45

Boxscore

Ukraine	95–43	Albania
Scoring by quarter: 22–12, 31–12, 24–9, 18–10

Triumph Hall, Samokov

11 July 2026
20:15

Boxscore

Switzerland	81–56	Bosnia and Herzegovina
Scoring by quarter: 24–16, 27–11, 17–10, 13–19

Triumph Hall, Samokov

12 July 2026
12:45

Boxscore

Romania	73–72	Albania
Scoring by quarter: 23–19, 18–19, 13–21, 19–13

Triumph Hall, Samokov

12 July 2026
15:15

Boxscore

Azerbaijan	56–63	Switzerland
Scoring by quarter: 7–17, 16–19, 13–17, 20–10

Triumph Hall, Samokov

12 July 2026
17:45

Boxscore

Ukraine	102–65	Bosnia and Herzegovina
Scoring by quarter: 35–21, 32–28, 17–7, 18–9

Triumph Hall, Samokov

== Qualifying round ==
=== Group E ===
Pos	Team	Pld	W	L	PF	PA	PD	Pts	Qualification
1	Greece	3	3	0	202	174	+28	6	Semifinals
2	Slovakia	3	2	1	197	193	+4	5	Semifinals
3	Czech Republic	3	1	2	216	202	+14	4	5th–8th place playoffs
4	Ireland	3	0	3	189	235	−46	3	5th–8th place playoffs

Source: FIBA

Note: The following matches were carried over from the first round: GRE v. IRL 68–62 and SVK v. CZE 70–64.

8 July 2026
13:00

Boxscore

Greece	67–58	Czech Republic
Scoring by quarter: 24–17, 20–11, 9–9, 14–21

Arena SamElyon, Samokov

8 July 2026
15:30

Boxscore

Slovakia	73–62	Ireland
Scoring by quarter: 32–14, 14–19, 16–14, 11–15

Arena SamElyon, Samokov

9 July 2026
13:00

Boxscore

Greece	67–54	Slovakia
Scoring by quarter: 17–16, 10–11, 21–9, 19–18

Arena SamElyon, Samokov

9 July 2026
15:30

Boxscore

Ireland	65–94	Czech Republic
Scoring by quarter: 17–28, 24–23, 14–20, 10–23

Arena SamElyon, Samokov

=== Group F ===
Pos	Team	Pld	W	L	PF	PA	PD	Pts	Qualification
1	Portugal	3	3	0	240	142	+98	6	Semifinals
2	Montenegro	3	2	1	191	179	+12	5	Semifinals
3	Bulgaria	3	1	2	191	235	−44	4	5th–8th place playoffs
4	Netherlands	3	0	3	155	221	−66	3	5th–8th place playoffs

Source: FIBA

Note: The following matches were carried over from the first round: BUL v. NED 79–72 and POR v. MNE 71–55.

8 July 2026
18:00

Boxscore

Bulgaria	60–69	Montenegro
Scoring by quarter: 18–13, 15–22, 14–21, 13–13

Arena SamElyon, Samokov

8 July 2026
20:30

Boxscore

Portugal	75–35	Netherlands
Scoring by quarter: 13–4, 18–13, 24–11, 20–7

Arena SamElyon, Samokov

9 July 2026
18:00

Boxscore

Bulgaria	52–94	Portugal
Scoring by quarter: 16–29, 9–15, 13–24, 14–26

Arena SamElyon, Samokov

9 July 2026
20:30

Boxscore

Netherlands	48–67	Montenegro
Scoring by quarter: 8–19, 16–8, 10–12, 14–28

Arena SamElyon, Samokov

== 5th–8th place playoffs ==
5th–8th place semifinals
11 July
E3 Czech Republic	77
F4 Netherlands	91
11 July
F3 Bulgaria	89
E4 Ireland	74

5th place match
12 July
Netherlands	81
Bulgaria	64
7th place match
12 July
Czech Republic	63
Ireland	57

=== 5th–8th place semifinals ===
11 July 2026
13:00

Boxscore

Czech Republic	77–91	Netherlands
Scoring by quarter: 22–24, 16–25, 19–19, 20–23

Arena SamElyon, Samokov

11 July 2026
15:30

Boxscore

Bulgaria	89–74	Ireland
Scoring by quarter: 30–20, 19–17, 17–19, 23–18

Arena SamElyon, Samokov

==== 7th place match ====
12 July 2026
13:00

Boxscore

Czech Republic	63–57	Ireland
Scoring by quarter: 12–22, 21–14, 5–14, 25–7

Arena SamElyon, Samokov

==== 5th place match ====
12 July 2026
15:30

Boxscore

Netherlands	81–64	Bulgaria
Scoring by quarter: 30–14, 15–21, 14–13, 22–16

Arena SamElyon, Samokov

== Championship playoffs ==
Semifinals
11 July
E1 Greece	78
F2 Montenegro	59
11 July
F1 Portugal	73
E2 Slovakia	46

Final
12 July
Greece	43
Portugal	78
3rd place match
12 July
Montenegro	70
Slovakia	55

=== Semifinals ===
11 July 2026
18:00

Boxscore

Greece	78–59	Montenegro
Scoring by quarter: 18–12, 19–17, 28–14, 13–16

Arena SamElyon, Samokov

11 July 2026
20:30

Boxscore

Portugal	73–46	Slovakia
Scoring by quarter: 16–5, 20–13, 19–11, 18–17

Arena SamElyon, Samokov

==== 3rd place match ====
12 July 2026
18:00

Boxscore

Montenegro	70–55	Slovakia
Scoring by quarter: 21–13, 16–13, 12–19, 21–10

Arena SamElyon, Samokov

==== Final ====
12 July 2026
20:30

Boxscore

Greece	43–78	Portugal
Scoring by quarter: 11–18, 14–15, 8–25, 10–20

Arena SamElyon, Samokov

== Final standings ==
Rank	Team	Record
1st place, gold medalist(s)	Portugal	6–0
2nd place, silver medalist(s)	Greece	6–1
3rd place, bronze medalist(s)	Montenegro	4–2
4	Slovakia	3–3
5	Netherlands	4–3
6	Bulgaria	4–3
7	Czech Republic	3–3
8	Ireland	2–5
9	Ukraine	5–2
10	Switzerland	4–3
11	Azerbaijan	3–4
12	Romania	2–5
13	Bosnia and Herzegovina	1–6
14	Albania	0–7

Promoted to the 2027 FIBA U20 Women's EuroBasket Division A
