= 2024 FIBA U20 Women's EuroBasket Division B =

International basketball tournament

Tournament details
- Host country: Bulgaria
- City: Sofia
- Dates: 6–14 July 2024
- Teams: 15 (from 1 confederation)
- Venues: 2 (in 1 host city)

Final positions
- Champions: Netherlands (2nd title)
- Runners-up: Belgium
- Third place: Czech Republic
- Fourth place: Iceland

Tournament statistics
- Games played: 49
- Top scorer: (Switzerland) Viktoria Ranisavljevic (23.8 ppg)

Official website
- www.fiba.basketball

The 2024 FIBA U20 Women's EuroBasket Division B was the 18th edition of the Division B of the European basketball championship for women's under-20 national teams. The tournament was played in Sofia, Bulgaria, from 6 to 14 July 2024.

== Participating teams ==
- Albania
- Austria
- Belgium ▼ (15th place, 2023 FIBA U20 Women's European Championship Division A)
- Bulgaria
- Croatia
- Czech Republic ▼ (14th place, 2023 FIBA U20 Women's European Championship Division A)
- Great Britain
- Greece
- Iceland
- Ireland
- Netherlands
- Romania
- Slovakia
- Switzerland
- Ukraine

== First round ==
The draw of the first round was held on 6 February 2024 in Freising, Germany.

In the first round, the teams were drawn into four groups. The first two teams from each group advanced to the Qualifying round; the other teams advanced to the 9th–15th place classification.

All times are local (Eastern European Summer Time – UTC+3).

=== Group A ===
Pos	Team	Pld	W	L	PF	PA	PD	Pts	Qualification
1	Czech Republic	3	3	0	235	178	+57	6	Qualifying round
2	Ireland	3	2	1	212	212	0	5	Qualifying round
3	Switzerland	3	1	2	209	220	−11	4	9th–15th place classification
4	Slovakia	3	0	3	196	242	−46	3	9th–15th place classification

Source: FIBA

6 July 2024
13:00

Boxscore

Ireland	91–61	Slovakia
Scoring by quarter: 25–10, 23–11, 22–21, 21–19
Pts: Malou-Mamel 17; Rebs: Malou-Mamel 13; Asts: Prenter 7		Pts: Uzovicova 15; Rebs: Molnarova 7 Asts: Szmerekova 5

Triaditsa Hall
Attendance: 50
Referees: Ciprian Stoica (ROU), Alexander Eger (AUT), Denys Povorozniuk (UKR)

6 July 2024
15:30

Boxscore

Czech Republic	76–66	Switzerland
Scoring by quarter: 13–27, 26–13, 20–22, 17–4
Pts: Kadlecova 23; Rebs: Three players 5 Asts: Hynkova, Kadlecova 4		Pts: Ranisavljevic 26; Rebs: Hulliger 8 Asts: Ranisavljevic, Vilolo Dos Santos 3

Triaditsa Hall
Attendance: 50
Referees: Alfred Jovovic (CRO), Danilo Petkovic (SRB), Michal Sosin (POL)

7 July 2024
15:30

Boxscore

Switzerland	71–78	Ireland
Scoring by quarter: 16–21, 16–18, 15–14, 24–25
Pts: Ranisavljevic 12; Rebs: Burkhalter 7 Asts: Popovic, Burkhalter 4		Pts: Coogan 19; Rebs: Malou-Mamel 16; Asts: Turner 5

St. George School Gym
Attendance: 50
Referees: Zoran Mitrovski (MKD), Kirsten Poffé (BEL), Dimitar Georgiev (BUL)

7 July 2024
18:00

Boxscore

Slovakia	69–79	Czech Republic
Scoring by quarter: 16–24, 20–24, 21–16, 12–15
Pts: Uzovicova 16; Rebs: Molnarova 11; Asts: Molnarova 7		Pts: Velichova 17; Rebs: Čechová 8 Asts: Kadlecova 5

St. George School Gym
Attendance: 60
Referees: Nemanja Vlahovic (SRB), Anastasia Tsakiraki (GRE), Andrej Zlatevski (MKD)

8 July 2024
13:00

Boxscore

Ireland	43–80	Czech Republic
Scoring by quarter: 12–29, 15–23, 5–14, 11–14
Pts: Prenter 7 Rebs: Malou-Mamel 6 Asts: Turner, Hickey 2		Pts: Paurova 18; Rebs: Čechová 14; Asts: Paurova 5

Triaditsa Hall
Attendance: 50
Referees: Gabrielius Simonavičius (LTU), Nikolaos Tziopanos (GRE), Nataša Dragojević (MNE)

8 July 2024
20:30

Boxscore

Switzerland	72–66	Slovakia
Scoring by quarter: 18–21, 17–15, 24–16, 13–14
Pts: Ranisavljevic 23; Rebs: Burkhalter, Matic 7 Asts: Ranisavljevic 6		Pts: Molnarova 20; Rebs: Podhradska 11; Asts: Szmerekova 8

Triaditsa Hall
Attendance: 50
Referees: Alfred Jovovic (CRO), Denys Povorozniuk (UKR), Nika Štampalija (CRO)

=== Group B ===
Pos	Team	Pld	W	L	PF	PA	PD	Pts	Qualification
1	Ukraine	3	3	0	212	151	+61	6	Qualifying round
2	Iceland	3	2	1	199	184	+15	5	Qualifying round
3	Bulgaria	3	1	2	186	200	−14	4	9th–15th place classification
4	Austria	3	0	3	161	223	−62	3	9th–15th place classification

Source: FIBA

6 July 2024
18:00

Boxscore

Bulgaria	47–73	Ukraine
Scoring by quarter: 9–16, 12–18, 14–20, 12–19
Pts: V. Ivanova 13; Rebs: Kokalova 8 Asts: Ilieva 5		Pts: Panchuk 14; Rebs: Kulesha 12; Asts: Lavrinets 6

Triaditsa Hall
Attendance: 300
Referees: Zdenko Zubak (SVK), Maciej Nazimek (IRL), Michal Scholze (CZE)

6 July 2024
20:30

Boxscore

Iceland	75–54	Austria
Scoring by quarter: 20–8, 19–12, 19–13, 17–21
Pts: Svansdóttir 18; Rebs: Boama 7 Asts: Vignisdottir 3		Pts: Horvath 14; Rebs: Meskic 8 Asts: Three players 2

Triaditsa Hall
Attendance: 50
Referees: Gabrielius Simonavičius (LTU), Kirsten Poffé (BEL), Nika Štampalija (CRO)

7 July 2024
18:00

Boxscore

Austria	56–78	Bulgaria
Scoring by quarter: 11–27, 15–19, 12–16, 18–16
Pts: Horvath 17; Rebs: Jacimovic 8 Asts: Stockinger 4		Pts: Boneva 21; Rebs: Tsekova 6 Asts: Karamfilova, V. Ivanova 4

Triaditsa Hall
Attendance: 300
Referees: Gabrielius Simonavičius (LTU), Danilo Petkovic (SRB), Michal Sosin (POL)

7 July 2024
20:30

Boxscore

Ukraine	69–53	Iceland
Scoring by quarter: 19–8, 18–17, 15–16, 17–12
Pts: Lapkhan, Dike 15; Rebs: Dike 10; Asts: Tykha 4		Pts: Nokkvadottir 14; Rebs: Boama 11; Asts: Vignisdottir 4

St. George School Gym
Attendance: 50
Referees: Nikolaos Tziopanos (GRE), Daniella Torok (HUN), Nataša Dragojević (MNE)

8 July 2024
15:30

Boxscore

Ukraine	70–51	Austria
Scoring by quarter: 23–9, 14–9, 17–14, 16–19
Pts: Hrumaliuk 11; Rebs: Tkachenko 6 Asts: Lavrinets 6		Pts: Rodhammer 18; Rebs: Rodhammer 8 Asts: Horvath 4

St. George School Gym
Attendance: 20
Referees: Zoran Mitrovski (MKD), Anastasia Tsakiraki (GRE), Katarina Stupar (SUI)

8 July 2024
18:00

Boxscore

Iceland	71–61	Bulgaria
Scoring by quarter: 14–17, 24–16, 15–16, 18–12
Pts: Falsdottir, Svansdóttir 16; Rebs: Boama 7 Asts: Falsdottir 3		Pts: Boneva 21; Rebs: Karamfilova 7 Asts: Three players 5

Triaditsa Hall
Attendance: 300
Referees: Ciprian Stoica (ROU), Kirsten Poffé (BEL), Andrej Zlatevski (MKD)

=== Group C ===
Pos	Team	Pld	W	L	PF	PA	PD	Pts	Qualification
1	Belgium	3	3	0	306	143	+163	6	Qualifying round
2	Croatia	3	2	1	236	169	+67	5	Qualifying round
3	Greece	3	1	2	195	196	−1	4	9th–15th place classification
4	Albania	3	0	3	116	345	−229	3	9th–15th place classification

Source: FIBA

6 July 2024
15:30

Boxscore

Greece	96–39	Albania
Scoring by quarter: 29–18, 27–1, 22–15, 18–5
Pts: Cooper 16; Rebs: Grigoropoulou 10; Asts: Xenitopoulou 8		Pts: Mucenji 10; Rebs: Gjata 5 Asts: Mucenji, Bokrina 4

St. George School Gym
Attendance: 20
Referees: Nemanja Vlahovic (SRB), Katarina Stupar (SUI), Dimitar Georgiev (BUL)

6 July 2024
18:00

Boxscore

Belgium	69–67	Croatia
Scoring by quarter: 23–24, 9–14, 21–12, 16–17
Pts: Battiston, Claessens 15; Rebs: Claessens 10; Asts: Denys, Claessens 4		Pts: Nejašmić 20; Rebs: Žaja 7 Asts: Rodek 9

St. George School Gym
Attendance: 30
Referees: Zoran Mitrovski (MKD), Daniella Torok (HUN), Natasa Dragojevic (MNE)

7 July 2024
13:00

Boxscore

Albania	30–150	Belgium
Scoring by quarter: 11–33, 12–31, 2–40, 5–46
Pts: Bokrina 13; Rebs: Four players 3 Asts: Sali 4		Pts: Daelemans 24; Rebs: Denys 8 Asts: Remacle 10

Triaditsa Hall
Attendance: 20
Referees: Ciprian Stoica (ROU), Katarina Stupar (SUI), Michal Scholze (CZE)

7 July 2024
20:30

Boxscore

Croatia	70–53	Greece
Scoring by quarter: 11–22, 16–10, 21–12, 22–9
Pts: Žaja 17; Rebs: Rodek 10; Asts: Nejašmić, Rodek 7		Pts: Papadaki 20; Rebs: Grigoropoulou 10; Asts: Xenitopoulou, Stefanaki 3

Triaditsa Hall
Attendance: 50
Referees: Zdenko Zubak (SVK), Maciej Nazimek (IRL), Denys Povorozniuk (UKR)

8 July 2024
15:30

Boxscore

Greece	46–87	Belgium
Scoring by quarter: 6–24, 17–23, 12–20, 11–20
Pts: Three players 9 Rebs: Grigoropoulou 10; Asts: Alexia, Xenitopoulou 2		Pts: Claessens 16; Rebs: Claessens 7 Asts: Four players 3

Triaditsa Hall
Attendance: 50
Referees: Nemanja Vlahovic (SRB), Danilo Petkovic (SRB), Michal Scholze (CZE)

8 July 2024
20:30

Boxscore

Croatia	99–47	Albania
Scoring by quarter: 16–12, 32–10, 24–13, 27–12
Pts: Skare 19; Rebs: Banović 13; Asts: Rimarcuk, Banović 5		Pts: Bokrina 18; Rebs: Murcaj 6 Asts: Mucenji, Selami 2

St. George School Gym
Attendance: 30
Referees: Michal Sosin (POL), Alexander Eger(AUT), Daniella Torok (HUN)

=== Group D ===
Pos	Team	Pld	W	L	PF	PA	PD	Pts	Qualification
1	Netherlands	2	2	0	162	105	+57	4	Qualifying round
2	Great Britain	2	1	1	150	140	+10	3	Qualifying round
3	Romania	2	0	2	102	169	−67	2	9th–15th place classification

Source: FIBA

6 July 2024
20:30

Boxscore

Romania	39–85	Netherlands
Scoring by quarter: 10–26, 8–14, 9–25, 12–20
Pts: Frincu 8 Rebs: Frincu 6 Asts: Frincu 5		Pts: Vennema 16; Rebs: Molina 13; Asts: Molina 5

St. George School Gym
Attendance: 50
Referees: Nikolaos Tziopanos (GRE), Anastasia Tsakiraki (GRE), Andrej Zlatevski (MKD)

7 July 2024
15:30

Boxscore

Netherlands	77–66	Great Britain
Scoring by quarter: 16–29, 14–17, 27–10, 20–10
Pts: Vennema 20; Rebs: Van Vliet 7 Asts: Stotijn 5		Pts: Forster 21; Rebs: Januszewska, Gibbins 6 Asts: Forster 6

Triaditsa Hall
Attendance: 100
Referees: Alfred Jovovic (CRO), Alexander Eger (AUT), Nika Štampalija (CRO)

8 July 2024
18:00

Boxscore

Great Britain	84–63	Romania
Scoring by quarter: 21–12, 15–14, 12–17, 36–20
Pts: Bunyan 25; Rebs: Bunyan 12; Asts: McGhee 7		Pts: Stanescu 11; Rebs: Bara Nemeth 6 Asts: Kozman 5

St. George School Gym
Attendance: 50
Referees: Zdenko Zubak (SVK), Maciej Nazimek (IRL), Dimitar Georgiev (BUL)

== 9th–15th place classification ==
=== Group G ===
Pos	Team	Pld	W	L	PF	PA	PD	Pts	Qualification
1	Greece	2	2	0	147	86	+61	4	9th place match
2	Switzerland	2	1	1	125	147	−22	3	11th place match
3	Austria	2	0	2	115	154	−39	2	13th place match

Source: FIBA

10 July 2024
15:30

Boxscore

Switzerland	78–76	Austria
Scoring by quarter: 21–15, 10–24, 24–19, 23–18
Pts: Ranisavljevic, Hulliger 24; Rebs: Matic 6 Asts: Hulliger 6		Pts: Stockinger 18; Rebs: Oriakhi 11; Asts: Horvath 6

St. George School Gym
Attendance: 20
Referees: Nikolaos Tziopanos (GRE), Andrej Zlatevski (MKD), Daniella Torok (HUN)

11 July 2024
15:30

Boxscore

Austria	39–76	Greece
Scoring by quarter: 5–20, 5–22, 8–24, 21–10
Pts: Rodhammer 17; Rebs: Trailovic 5 Asts: Praschl 3		Pts: Stefanaki 18; Rebs: Grigoropoulou 11; Asts: Alexia 5

St. George School Gym
Attendance: 20
Referees: Zoran Mitrovski (MKD), Denys Povorozniuk (UKR), Nika Štampalija (CRO)

13 July 2024
15:30

Boxscore

Greece	71–47	Switzerland
Scoring by quarter: 24–1, 18–20, 14–16, 15–10
Pts: Grigoropoulou 28; Rebs: Alexia 16; Asts: Four players 5		Pts: Locatelli 13; Rebs: Matic 7 Asts: Three players 2

St. George School Gym
Attendance: 50
Referees: Alfred Jovovic (CRO), Denys Povorozniuk (UKR), Daniella Torok (HUN)

=== Group H ===
Pos	Team	Pld	W	L	PF	PA	PD	Pts	Qualification
1	Bulgaria	3	3	0	173	121	+52	6	9th place match
2	Slovakia	3	2	1	152	128	+24	5	11th place match
3	Romania	3	1	2	229	195	+34	4	13th place match
4	Albania	3	0	3	170	280	−110	3	15th place

Source: FIBA

10 July 2024
18:00

Boxscore

Bulgaria	90–60	Albania
Scoring by quarter: 25–14, 22–21, 18–12, 25–13
Pts: Karamfilova 19; Rebs: Karamfilova 9 Asts: Ilieva 5		Pts: Mucenji 13; Rebs: Gjata 7 Asts: Danaj 4

St. George School Gym
Attendance: 100
Referees: Alfred Jovovic (CRO), Michal Scholze (CZE), Nika Štampalija (CRO)

10 July 2024
20:30

Boxscore

Slovakia	66–64	Romania
Scoring by quarter: 12–13, 14–17, 11–10, 29–24
Pts: Molnarova 20; Rebs: Nigutova, Molnarova 8 Asts: Uzovicova 6		Pts: Ivan 20; Rebs: Ivan, Bara Nemeth 7 Asts: Three players 3

St. George School Gym
Attendance: 30
Referees: Nemanja Vlahovic (SRB), Alexander Eger (AUT), Katarina Stupar (SUI)

11 July 2024
18:00

Boxscore

Romania	61–63	Bulgaria
Scoring by quarter: 16–20, 17–16, 17–13, 11–14
Pts: Ivan 23; Rebs: Frincu 7 Asts: Frincu 5		Pts: Karamfilova 19; Rebs: Karamfilova 13; Asts: Boneva 5

St. George School Gym
Attendance: 150
Referees: Zdenko Zubak (SVK), Kirsten Poffé (BEL), Daniella Torok (HUN)

11 July 2024
20:30

Boxscore

Albania	44–86	Slovakia
Scoring by quarter: 9–25, 9–29, 15–19, 11–13
Pts: Mucenji 19; Rebs: Gjata 8 Asts: Sali, Mucenji 4		Pts: Jakubcekova 14; Rebs: Tomajkova 10; Asts: Nigutova, Mrazova 5

St. George School Gym
Attendance: 30
Referees: Gabrielius Simonavičius (LTU), Maciej Nazimek (IRL), Anastasia Tsakiraki (GRE)

13 July 2024
18:00

Boxscore

Slovakia	0–20	Bulgaria

St. George School Gym
Referees: Nemanja Vlahovic (SRB), Nikolaos Tziopanos (GRE), Katarina Stupar (SUI)

13 July 2024
20:30

Boxscore

Albania	66–104	Romania
Scoring by quarter: 20–26, 20–17, 15–26, 11–35
Pts: Bokrina 26; Rebs: Sali, Mucenji 7 Asts: Sali, Bokrina 4		Pts: Puscasu 30; Rebs: Pricop 14; Asts: Kozman 8

St. George School Gym
Attendance: 20
Referees: Michal Sosin (POL), Michal Scholze (CZE), Nika Štampalija (CRO)

=== 13th place match ===
14 July 2024
15:00

Boxscore

Austria	0–20	Romania

St. George School Gym
Referees: Nikolaos Tziopanos (GRE), Danilo Petkovic (SRB), Dimitar Georgiev (BUL)

=== 11th place match ===
14 July 2024
17:30

Boxscore

Switzerland	2–0	Slovakia
Scoring by quarter: 2–0
Pts: De Preux 2 Rebs: De Preux 1

St. George School Gym
Referees: Alexander Eger (AUT), Michal Scholze (CZE), Nika Štampaljia (CRO)

=== 9th place match ===
14 July 2024
12:30

Boxscore

Greece	20–0	Bulgaria

St. George School Gym
Referees: Maciej Nazimek (IRL), Denys Povorozniuk (UKR), Andrej Zlatevski (MKD)

== Qualifying round ==
=== Group E ===
Pos	Team	Pld	W	L	PF	PA	PD	Pts	Qualification
1	Czech Republic	3	3	0	234	156	+78	6	Semifinals
2	Iceland	3	1	2	202	181	+21	4	Semifinals
3	Ukraine	3	1	2	177	209	−32	4	5th–8th place playoffs
4	Ireland	3	1	2	157	224	−67	4	5th–8th place playoffs

Source: FIBA

10 July 2024
13:00

Boxscore

Czech Republic	67–61	Iceland
Scoring by quarter: 24–17, 12–10, 12–16, 19–18
Pts: Hynkova 15; Rebs: Čechová 23; Asts: Hynkova 6		Pts: Svansdottir 19; Rebs: Falsdottir 7 Asts: Four players 3

Triaditza Hall
Attendance: 35
Referees: Zoran Mitrovski (MKD), Danilo Petkovic (SRB), Dimitar Georgiev (BUL)

10 July 2024
15:30

Boxscore

Ireland	69–56	Ukraine
Scoring by quarter: 16–15, 17–12, 17–13, 19–16
Pts: Hickey 22; Rebs: Hickey 13; Asts: Prenter 6		Pts: Kulesha 17; Rebs: Kulesha, Dike 7 Asts: Tykha 6

Triaditza Hall
Attendance: 45
Referees: Ciprian Stoica (ROU), Michal Sosin (POL), Kirsten Poffé (BEL)

11 July 2024
13:00

Boxscore

Ukraine	52–87	Czech Republic
Scoring by quarter: 11–29, 13–16, 6–24, 22–18
Pts: Putra 15; Rebs: Dike 5 Asts: Tykha 4		Pts: Kytlicova 16; Rebs: Čechová 7 Asts: Brozova 6

Triaditza Hall
Attendance: 50
Referees: Nikolaos Tziopanos (GRE), Andrej Zlatevski (MKD), Alexander Eger (AUT)

11 July 2024
15:30

Boxscore

Iceland	88–45	Ireland
Scoring by quarter: 22–16, 23–6, 21–14, 22–9
Pts: Svansdottir 26; Rebs: Olafsdottir 10; Asts: Svansdottir 4		Pts: Coogan 11; Rebs: Malou-Mamel 8 Asts: Four players 2

Triaditza Hall
Attendance: 50
Referees: Alfred Jovovic (CRO), Danilo Petkovic (SRB), Katarina Stupar (SUI)

=== Group F ===
Pos	Team	Pld	W	L	PF	PA	PD	Pts	Qualification
1	Belgium	3	3	0	221	177	+44	6	Semifinals
2	Netherlands	3	2	1	225	193	+32	5	Semifinals
3	Croatia	3	1	2	198	218	−20	4	5th–8th place playoffs
4	Great Britain	3	0	3	177	233	−56	3	5th–8th place playoffs

Source: FIBA

10 July 2024
18:00

Boxscore

Belgium	82–48	Great Britain
Scoring by quarter: 24–8, 12–16, 21–8, 25–16
Pts: Claessens 18; Rebs: Claessens 9 Asts: Claessens 7		Pts: Januszewska 12; Rebs: Januszewska 7 Asts: McGhee 2

Triaditza Hall
Attendance: 60
Referees: Gabrielius Simonavičius (LTU), Maciej Nazimek (IRL), Natasa Dragojevic (MNE)

10 July 2024
20:30

Boxscore

Croatia	57–86	Netherlands
Scoring by quarter: 15–19, 12–18, 18–22, 12–27
Pts: Nejasmic 17; Rebs: Nejasmic 15; Asts: Novak 5		Pts: Vennema 24; Rebs: Van Vliet 9 Asts: Molina 6

Triaditza Hall
Attendance: 60
Referees: Zdenko Zubak (SVK), Anastasia Tsakiraki (GRE), Denys Povorozniuk (UKR)

11 July 2024
18:00

Boxscore

Netherlands	62–70	Belgium
Scoring by quarter: 16–14, 15–16, 21–18, 10–22
Pts: Olsem 15; Rebs: Olsem 9 Asts: Stotijn 7		Pts: Daelemans 21; Rebs: Claessens 14; Asts: Batiston 5

Triaditza Hall
Attendance: 105
Referees: Nemanja Vlahovic (SRB), Natasa Dragojevic (MNE), Dimitar Georgiev (BUL)

11 July 2024
20:30

Boxscore

Great Britain	63–74	Croatia
Scoring by quarter: 15–21, 11–13, 22–22, 15–18
Pts: Omoshola 14; Rebs: Omoshola 7 Asts: Forster 7		Pts: Saric 20; Rebs: Zaja 10; Asts: Rodek 14

Triaditza Hall
Attendance: 45
Referees: Ciprian Stoica (ROU), Michal Scholze (CZE), Michal Sosin (POL)

== 5th–8th place playoffs ==
5th–8th place semifinals
E3	Ukraine	70
F4	Great Britain	55
F3	Croatia	73
E4	Ireland	87

5th place match
Ukraine	66
Ireland	74
7th place match
Great Britain	20
Croatia	0

=== 5th–8th place semifinals ===
13 July 2024
13:00

Boxscore

Ukraine	70–55	Great Britain
Scoring by quarter: 9–8, 19–17, 25–10, 17–20
Pts: Tkachenko 16; Rebs: Dike 11; Asts: Dike 8		Pts: Edge 13; Rebs: Bunyan 9 Asts: Bunyan 6

Triaditza Hall
Attendance: 45
Referees: Ciprian Stoica (ROU), Dimitar Georgiev (BUL), Kirsten Poffé (BEL)

13 July 2024
15:30

Boxscore

Croatia	73–87	Ireland
Scoring by quarter: 24–24, 12–27, 14–17, 23–19
Pts: Zaja 21; Rebs: Rodek 12; Asts: Rodek 8		Pts: Prenter 23; Rebs: Ugwah 18; Asts: Prenter 11

Triaditza Hall
Attendance: 45
Referees: Zdenko Zubak (SVK), Andrej Zlatevski (MKD), Alexander Eger (AUT)

=== 7th place match ===
14 July 2024
12:30

Boxscore

Great Britain	20–0	Croatia

Triaditza Hall
Referees: Zdenko Zubak (SVK), Anastasia Tsakiraki (GRE), Katarina Stupar (SUI)

=== 5th place match ===
14 July 2024
15:00

Boxscore

Ukraine	66–74	Ireland
Scoring by quarter: 20–25, 12–15, 17–21, 17–13
Pts: Tykha, Kulesha 15; Rebs: Putra 10; Asts: Lapkhan 5		Pts: Hickey 24; Rebs: Malou-Mamel 14; Asts: Prenter 7

Triaditza Hall
Attendance: 50
Referees: Ciprian Stoica (ROU), Michal Sosin (POL), Daniella Torok (HUN)

== Championship playoffs ==
Semifinals
E1	Czech Republic	71
F2	Netherlands	85
F1	Belgium	87
E2	Iceland	51

Final
Netherlands	80
Belgium	65
3rd place match
Czech Republic	77
Iceland	52

=== Semifinals ===
13 July 2024
18:00

Boxscore

Czech Republic	71–85	Netherlands
Scoring by quarter: 26–18, 22–16, 6–25, 17–26
Pts: Paurova 19; Rebs: Čechová 15; Asts: Brozova, Hynkova 3		Pts: Olsem 17; Rebs: Olsem 11; Asts: Vennema 5

Triaditza Hall
Attendance: 50
Referees: Maciej Nazimek (IRL), Gabrielius Simonavičius (LTU), Anastasia Tsakiraki (GRE)

13 July 2024
20:30

Boxscore

Belgium	87–51	Iceland
Scoring by quarter: 16–11, 12–13, 34–14, 25–13
Pts: Claessens 18; Rebs: Battiston 6 Asts: Three players 4		Pts: Eliasdottir 11; Rebs: Falsdottir 7 Asts: Falsdottir, Vignisdottir 3

Triaditza Hall
Attendance: 50
Referees: Zoran Mitrovski (MKD), Natasa Dragojevic (MNE), Danilo Petkovic (SRB)

=== 3rd place match ===
14 July 2024
17:30

Boxscore

Czech Republic	77–52	Iceland
Scoring by quarter: 18–3, 20–16, 22–12, 17–21
Pts: Kadlecova 16; Rebs: Vydrova, Čechová 15; Asts: Hynkova 7		Pts: Eliasdottir 16; Rebs: Karlsdottir 10; Asts: Falsdottir, Vignisdottir 3

Triaditza Hall
Attendance: 70
Referees: Zoran Mitrovski (MKD), Alfred Jovovic (CRO), Kirsten Poffé (BEL)

=== Final ===
14 July 2024
20:00

Boxscore

Netherlands	80–65	Belgium
Scoring by quarter: 22–13, 23–22, 14–18, 21–12
Pts: Olsem 29; Rebs: Olsem 10; Asts: Olsem 4		Pts: Denys, Claessens 16; Rebs: Denys 11; Asts: Battiston 6

Triaditza Hall
Attendance: 200
Referees: Nemanja Vlahovic (SRB), Gabrielius Simonavičius (LTU), Natasa Dragojevic (MNE)

== Final standings ==
Rank	Team
1st place, gold medalist(s)	Netherlands
2nd place, silver medalist(s)	Belgium
3rd place, bronze medalist(s)	Czech Republic
4	Iceland
5	Ireland
6	Ukraine
7	Great Britain
8	Croatia
9	Greece
10	Bulgaria
11	Switzerland
12	Slovakia
13	Romania
14	Austria
15	Albania

Promoted to the 2025 FIBA U20 Women's EuroBasket Division A
Promoted to the 2025 FIBA U20 Women's EuroBasket Division A after Montenegro's withdrawal
