= England team =

Team England usually refers to the name under which athletes representing Commonwealth Games England compete.

England team or Team England may refer to:

- Commonwealth Games England
- England national football team
- England cricket team
- England national rugby union team
- England national rugby league team
- England national basketball team (disambiguation)
- England national beach soccer team
- England national badminton team
- England national korfball team
- England national futsal team
- Team England (roller derby)
