= 2004 FIBA Europe Under-20 Championship for Women =

2004 FIBA U20 Women's European Championship
3rd FIBA Under-20 Women's European Basketball Championship

Tournament details
- Host country: France
- Dates: 23 July – 1 August 2004
- Teams: 12 (from 1 federation)
- Venue: (in 1 host city)

Final positions
- Champions: Russia (2nd title)

Official website
- fibaeurope.com

The 2004 FIBA Europe Under-20 Championship for Women was the third edition of the FIBA Europe Under-20 Championship for Women. 12 teams participated in the competition, held in Vannes, France, from 23 July to 1 August 2004. Russia won their second title.

== Qualification ==
Twenty-three national teams entered the qualifying round. They were allocated in four groups. The first three teams from groups A, B, C and the first two teams from group D qualified for the tournament, where they joined France (qualified as hosts).

Group A

Team	Pld	W	L	PF	PA	PD	Pts
Spain	5	5	0	409	212	+197	10
Italy	5	4	1	384	318	+66	9
Belgium	5	3	2	300	300	0	8
Portugal	5	2	3	290	311	−21	7
Ireland	5	1	4	303	369	−66	6
England	5	0	5	203	379	−176	5

Group B

Team	Pld	W	L	PF	PA	PD	Pts
Slovakia	5	5	0	355	278	+77	10
Hungary	5	4	1	316	236	+80	9
Poland	5	3	2	365	251	+114	8
Greece	5	2	3	292	292	0	7
Sweden	5	1	4	233	317	−84	6
Luxembourg	5	0	5	197	384	−187	5

Group C

Team	Pld	W	L	PF	PA	PD	Pts
Russia	5	5	0	406	249	+157	10
Ukraine	5	4	1	390	337	+53	9
Finland	5	2	3	326	373	−47	7
Israel	5	2	3	319	328	−9	7
Germany	5	1	4	276	375	−99	6
Latvia	5	1	4	317	372	−55	6

Group D

Team	Pld	W	L	PF	PA	PD	Pts
Czech Republic	4	4	0	331	223	+108	8
Croatia	4	3	1	328	225	+103	7
Turkey	4	2	2	286	271	+15	6
Slovenia	4	1	3	247	227	+20	5
Austria	4	0	4	148	394	−246	4

=== Qualified teams ===
- Belgium
- Croatia
- Czech Republic
- Finland
- France
- Hungary
- Italy
- Poland
- Russia
- Slovakia
- Spain
- Ukraine

== Preliminary round ==
In this round, the twelve teams were allocated in two groups of six teams each. The top four teams qualify for the Quarterfinals.

Team advances to Quarterfinals
Team will compete in 9th–12th playoffs

Times given below are in CEST (UTC+2).

=== Group A ===
Team	Pld	W	L	PF	PA	Pts
France	5	5	0	375	283	10
Russia	5	3	2	383	313	8
Ukraine	5	3	2	393	324	8
Slovakia	5	3	2	350	365	8
Finland	5	1	4	336	427	6
Italy	5	0	5	278	415	5

=== Group B ===
Team	Pld	W	L	PF	PA	Pts
Czech Republic	5	4	1	374	308	9
Hungary	5	3	2	309	281	8
Poland	5	3	2	332	320	8
Croatia	5	2	3	340	369	7
Belgium	5	2	3	323	352	7
Spain	5	1	4	301	346	6

== 9th – 12th place playoffs ==
Playoffs
Belgium	64
Italy	58
Spain	99
Finland	97

Ninth place
Spain	83
Belgium	61
Eleventh place
Italy	58
Finland	70

== Championship playoffs ==
Fifth place
A3	Ukraine	82
B3	Poland	77
Seventh place
B4	Croatia	55
A4	Slovakia	84

Consolation semifinals
A3	Ukraine	106
B4	Croatia	63
B3	Poland	75
A4	Slovakia	72

Quarterfinals
B2	Hungary	73
A3	Ukraine	55
A1	France	91
B4	Croatia	45
A2	Russia	92
B3	Poland	74
B1	Czech Republic	74
A4	Slovakia	69

Semifinals
B2	Hungary	48
A1	France	64
A2	Russia	89
B1	Czech Republic	79

Final
A1	France	64
A2	Russia	80
Third place
B2	Hungary	52
B1	Czech Republic	72

2004 FIBA Europe U-20
Championship for Women

Russia
Second title

== Final standings ==
Rank	Team	Record
Gold medal	Russia	6-2
Silver medal	France	7-1
Bronze medal	Czech Republic	6-2
4th	Hungary	4-4
5th	Ukraine	5-3
6th	Poland	4-4
7th	Slovakia	4-4
8th	Croatia	2-6
9th	Spain	3-4
10th	Belgium	3-4
11th	Finland	2-5
12th	Italy	0-7
