= Luxembourg women's national under-20 basketball team =

National basketball team of Luxembourg

Luxembourg
- FIBA zone: FIBA Europe
- National federation: Luxembourg Basketball Federation

U20 European Championship
- Appearances: None

U20 European Championship Division B
- Appearances: None

The Luxembourg women's national under-20 basketball team is a national basketball team of Luxembourg, administered by the Luxembourg Basketball Federation. It represents the country in women's international under-20 basketball competitions. In 2000 and 2004, the team participated at the FIBA Europe Under-20 Championship for Women qualifications.

== Team results ==
28 July 1999

Boxscore

| Hungary | 93–26 | Luxembourg |

30 July 1999

Boxscore

| Portugal | 85–33 | Luxembourg |

31 July 1999

Boxscore

| Croatia | 87–50 | Luxembourg |

1 August 1999

Boxscore

| Luxembourg | 30–82 | Ukraine |

30 July 2003

Boxscore

| Slovakia | 93–50 | Luxembourg |

31 July 2003

Boxscore

| Hungary | 80–28 | Luxembourg |

1 August 2003

Boxscore

| Luxembourg | 53–80 | Greece |

2 August 2003

Boxscore

| Sweden | 45–37 | Luxembourg |

3 August 2003

Boxscore

| Luxembourg | 29–86 | Poland |

== See also ==
- Luxembourg women's national basketball team
- Luxembourg women's national under-18 basketball team
- Luxembourg men's national under-20 basketball team
