= Iceland national basketball team =

Iceland national basketball team is a name given to national basketball teams from Iceland and may refer to:

== Men's teams ==
- Iceland men's national basketball team
- Iceland men's national under-20 basketball team
- Iceland men's national under-18 basketball team
- Iceland men's national under-16 basketball team

== Women's teams ==
- Iceland women's national basketball team
- Iceland women's national under-20 basketball team
- Iceland women's national under-18 basketball team
- Iceland women's national under-16 basketball team
