= Croatia women's national under-20 basketball team =

National basketball team of Croatia

Croatia
- FIBA zone: FIBA Europe
- National federation: Croatian Basketball Federation

U21 World Championship
- Appearances: 1
- Medals: None

U20 EuroBasket
- Appearances: 5
- Medals: None

U20 EuroBasket Division B
- Appearances: 7
- Medals: (bronze) Bronze: 2 (2017, 2025)

The Croatia women's national under-20 basketball team is a national basketball team of Croatia, administered by the Croatian Basketball Federation. It represents the country in international under-20 women's basketball competitions.

== FIBA U20 Women's EuroBasket participations ==
Year	Division A	Division B
2000	6th	
2002	6th	
2004	8th	
2005	5th	
2016		7th
2017		3rd place, bronze medalist(s)

Year	Division A	Division B
2018	16th	
2019		6th
2022		17th
2023		9th
2024		8th
2025		3rd place, bronze medalist(s)

== FIBA Under-21 World Championship for Women participations ==
Year	Result
2003	4th

== See also ==
- Croatia women's national basketball team
- Croatia women's national under-18 basketball team
- Croatia men's national under-20 basketball team
