= England women's national under-20 basketball team =

Youth basketball team representing England

England
- FIBA zone: FIBA Europe
- National federation: Basketball England

U20 European Championship
- Appearances: None

U20 European Championship Division B
- Appearances: None

The England women's national under-20 basketball team is a national basketball team of England, administered by the Basketball England. It represents the country in women's international under-20 basketball competitions. In 2002 and 2004, the team participated at the FIBA Europe Under-20 Championship for Women qualifications.

== Team results ==
8 August 2001

Boxscore

Portugal	68–59	England

9 August 2001

Boxscore

England	61–45	Denmark

10 August 2001

Boxscore

Italy	58–53	England

11 August 2001

Boxscore

England	45–84	France

12 August 2001

Boxscore

England	78–66	Belgium

30 July 2003

Boxscore

Spain	82–31	England

31 July 2003

Boxscore

England	46–95	Italy

1 August 2003

Boxscore

Portugal	65–37	England

2 August 2003

Boxscore

England	44–71	Ireland

3 August 2003

Boxscore

England	45–66	Belgium

== See also ==
- England women's national basketball team
- England women's national under-18 basketball team
