= Turkey women's national under-20 basketball team =

National basketball team of Turkey

Turkey
- Joined FIBA: 1936
- FIBA zone: FIBA Europe
- National federation: Turkish Basketball Federation

U21 World Championship
- Appearances: None

U20 EuroBasket
- Appearances: 18
- Medals: (bronze) Bronze: 2 (2012, 2013)

U20 EuroBasket Division B
- Appearances: 3
- Medals: (silver) Silver: (2022)
Home	Away

The Turkey women's national under-20 basketball team (Turkish: Ümit Milli Kadın Basketbol Takımı) is a national basketball team of Turkey, administered by the Turkish Basketball Federation. It represents the country in international under-20 women's basketball competitions.

== FIBA U20 Women's EuroBasket participations ==
Year	Position	Pld	W	L	PF	PA
(Slovakia) 2000	4th	11	4	7	59.3	61.3
(Croatia) 2002	8th	11	4	7	64.2	69.6
(France) 2004	did not qualify	4	2	2	71.5	67.8
(Czech Republic) 2005	13th	8	4	4	70.4	68.5
(Hungary) 2006	11th	8	5	3	73.3	67.3
(Bulgaria) 2007	4th	8	4	4	72.3	72.0
(Italy) 2008	7th	8	4	4	66.5	65.5
(Poland) 2009	6th	9	4	5	63.4	64.6
(Latvia) 2010	7th	9	5	4	64.8	63.7
(Serbia) 2011	9th	8	4	4	64.0	59.4
(Hungary) 2012	3rd place, bronze medalist(s)	9	8	1	61.9	54.3
(Turkey) 2013	3rd place, bronze medalist(s)	9	7	2	58.0	47.0
(Italy) 2014	9th	9	6	3	56.8	50.6
(Spain) 2015	9th	9	5	4	62.5	56.3
(Portugal) 2016	13th	7	2	5		
(Portugal) 2017	15th▼	7	2	5		
(Romania) 2018	5th (Div. B)	7	4	3		
(Kosovo) 2019	7th (Div. B)	6	3	3		
(North Macedonia) 2022	(silver) ▲ (Div. B)	7	6	1		
(Lithuania) 2023	8th	7	2	5		
(Lithuania) 2024	7th	7	4	3		
(Portugal) 2025	7th	7	5	2		
(Lithuania) 2026	7th	7	3	4		

== Squads ==
- 2010 FIBA Europe Under-20 Championship for Women — 7th place
  Safiye Karaman, Burcu Çiğil, Gonca Karataş, Yasemen Saylar, Asena Yalçın, Ayşe Derici, Özge Yavaş, Damla Gezgin, Tuğçe Canıtez, Esra Ural, Yelda Kavazoğlu, Ebru Ağar, Head coach: (Turkey) Aziz Akkaya
- 2011 FIBA Europe Under-20 Championship for Women — 9th place
  Pınar Demirok, Asena Yalçın, Ayşegül Günay, Serenay Çakmakçı, Ayşe Cora, Emel Türkyılmaz, Özge Yavaş, Tuğçe Murat, Pelin Gülbağ, Esra Ural, Nazlı Gökdemir, Gamze Takmaz, Head coach: (Turkey) Aziz Akkaya
- 2012 FIBA Europe Under-20 Championship for Women — Bronze Medal
  Gizem Sezer, Ayşegül Günay, Özge Kavurmacıoğlu, Pelin Bilgiç, Ayşe Cora, Büşra Akgün, Cansu Köksal, Elif Emirtekin, Emel Güler, Merve Aydın, Gizem Başaran, Olcay Çakır, Head coach: (Turkey) Aziz Akkaya
- 2013 FIBA Europe Under-20 Championship for Women — Bronze Medal
  Olcay Çakır, Merve Aydın, Büşra Akgün, Cansu Köksal, Ayşe Cora, Pelin Bilgiç, Didem Nakas, Özge Kavurmacıoğlu, Elif Emirtekin, Melike Yalçınkaya, Tilbe Şenyürek, Gizem Sezer, Head coach: (Turkey) Aziz Akkaya
- 2014 FIBA Europe Under-20 Championship for Women — 9th place
  Gizem Uca, Deniz Doğan, Büşra Akbaş, Cansu Köksal, Sinem Ataş, Pelin Bilgiç, Gizem Sezer, Doğa Comba, Elif Emirtekin, Sehernaz Çidal, Hülya Çoklar, Tilbe Şenyürek, Head coach: (Turkey) Erman Okerman
- 2015 FIBA Europe Under-20 Championship for Women — 9th place
  Büşra Akbaş, Ezgi Manlacı, Melis Gülcan, Sinem Ataş, Fahriye Bayraktar, Beylem İlba, Hülya Çoklar, Kübra Erat, Başak Altunbey, Sevgi Uzun, Aylin Darınç, Tilbe Şenyürek
- 2017 FIBA U20 Women's European Championship — 15th place
  Şelale Kepenç, Melisa Korkmaz, Yaren Uslular, Sevgi Uzun, Merve Arı, Meltem Avcı, Seda Deniz, İnci Güçlü, İlayda Güner, İrem Naz Topuz, Derin Yaya, Nur Nihan Dabakoğlu, Head coach: (Turkey) Alper Durur
- 2018 FIBA U20 Women's European Championship Division B — 5th place
  Şelale Kepenç, Merve Arı, Deniz Dalkıran, İlayda Güner, Eda Şahin, Gülse Uğur, Feride Akalan, Zeynep Şevval Gül, Yağmur Taşar, Meltem Topaloğlu, Fatmanur Karakaş, Gökşen Fitik, Head coach: (Turkey) Özlem Şencan
- 2019 FIBA U20 Women's European Championship Division B — 7th place
  İlayda Güner, Gülse Uğur, Feride Akalan, Zeynep Şevval Gül, Yağmur Taşar, Meltem Topaloğlu, Duygu Özen, Mısra Albayrak, Derin Erdoğan, Melek Uzunoğlu, Elif Bayram, Sevgi Tonguç, Head coach: (Turkey) Ayhan Avcı
- 2022 FIBA U20 Women's European Championship Division B — Silver Medal
  Derin Erdoğan, Sude Yılmaz, Melek Uzunoğlu, Banu Şimşek, Hatice Pelin Gülçelik, İdil Saçılır, Sevgi Tonguç, Rana Uçar, Saliha Mandıracı, Arifecan Vardar, Selin Rachel Gül, Berfin Sertoğlu, Head coach: (Turkey) Hasan Çağrı Özek
- 2023 FIBA U20 Women's European Championship — 8th place
  Arifecan Vardar, Zeyno Seren, Mariya Taşer, Selin Rachel Gül, Berfin Sertoğlu, Ayşe Yılmaz, Selen Baş, Deniz Torgut, Şevval Kaplan, Öykü Oktan, Elif İstanbulluoğlu, Ceren Akpınar, Head coach: (Turkey) Mert Oktay
- 2024 FIBA U20 Women's EuroBasket — 7th place
  Ece Erginay, Elif İstanbulluoğlu, Şevval Kaplan, Işık Su Güven, Ceren Akpınar, Berfin Sertoğlu, Nehir Ulufer, İdal Yavuz, Feryal Atlı, Sudenur Akarpa, Deniz Torgut, Feray Dalkılıç, Head coach: (Turkey) Ekrem Memnun
- 2025 FIBA U20 Women's EuroBasket — 7th place
  Ece Erginay, Elif İstanbulluoğlu, Işık Su Güven, Selin Tekin, Ceren Akpınar, İdil Yeniçulha, Nehir Ulufer, Yağmur Yılmaz, Aleyna Tokgöz, Azra Erçelik, Feray Laçin, Eslem Güler, Head coach: (Turkey) Mert Oktay
- 2026 FIBA U20 Women's EuroBasket — 7th place
  Selin Tekin, Eylül Babuz, Elif Batı, İdil Yeniçulha, Ayşenaz Harma, Zeynep Töremiş, Aleyna Tokgöz, Tuana Vural, Şeyma Yılık, Asya Barnes, Feryal Atlı, Mina Berber, Head coach: (Turkey) Tuğçe Canbaz

== See also ==
- Men's
- Turkey Men's national basketball team
- Turkey Men's national basketball team U20
- Turkey Men's national basketball team U18 and U19
- Turkey Men's national basketball team U16 and U17
- Turkey Men's national 3x3 team
- Women's
- Turkey Women's national basketball team
- Turkey Women's national basketball team U20
- Turkey Women's national basketball team U18 and U19
- Turkey Women's national basketball team U16 and U17
- Turkey Women's national 3x3 team
