= 2005 FIBA Europe Under-20 Championship for Women =

2005 FIBA U20 Women's European Championship
4th FIBA Under-20 Women's European Basketball Championship

Tournament details
- Host country: Czech Republic
- Dates: 1–10 July 2005
- Teams: 16
- Venues: 2 (in 1 host city)

Final positions
- Champions: France (1st title)

The 2005 FIBA Europe Under-20 Championship for Women was the fourth edition of the Women's European basketball championship for national under-20 teams. It was held in Brno, Czech Republic, from 1 to 10 July 2005. France women's national under-20 basketball team won the tournament and became the European champions for the first time.

== Participating teams ==
- Belgium
- Croatia
- Czech Republic
- Finland
- France
- Germany
- Greece
- Hungary
- Italy
- Latvia
- Poland
- Romania
- Russia
- Spain
- Turkey
- Ukraine

== First round ==
In the first round, the teams were drawn into four groups of four. The first two teams from each group advance to the quarterfinal round, the other teams will play in the classification round for 9th–16th place.

=== Group A ===
Pos	Team	Pld	W	L	PF	PA	PD	Pts	Qualification
1	Croatia	3	3	0	200	183	+17	6	Quarterfinal round
2	Spain	3	2	1	195	196	−1	5	Quarterfinal round
3	Czech Republic	3	1	2	202	200	+2	4	Classification round for 9th–16th place
4	Romania	3	0	3	188	206	−18	3	Classification round for 9th–16th place

Source: FIBA Archive

1 July 2005

Boxscore

Romania	51–59	Spain

1 July 2005

Boxscore

Croatia	56–54	Czech Republic

2 July 2005

Boxscore

Czech Republic	77–71	Romania

2 July 2005

Boxscore

Spain	63–74	Croatia

3 July 2005

Boxscore

Romania	66–70	Croatia

3 July 2005

Boxscore

Czech Republic	71–73	Spain

=== Group B ===
Pos	Team	Pld	W	L	PF	PA	PD	Pts	Qualification
1	Ukraine	3	3	0	239	187	+52	6	Quarterfinal round
2	Latvia	3	2	1	205	167	+38	5	Quarterfinal round
3	Hungary	3	1	2	158	220	−62	4	Classification round for 9th–16th place
4	Turkey	3	0	3	185	213	−28	3	Classification round for 9th–16th place

Source: FIBA Archive

1 July 2005

Boxscore

Latvia	64–52	Turkey

1 July 2005

Boxscore

Ukraine	85–48	Hungary

2 July 2005

Boxscore

Hungary	41–72	Latvia

2 July 2005

Boxscore

Turkey	70–80	Ukraine

3 July 2005

Boxscore

Latvia	69–74	Ukraine

3 July 2005

Boxscore

Hungary	69–63	Turkey

=== Group C ===
Pos	Team	Pld	W	L	PF	PA	PD	Pts	Qualification
1	Italy	3	2	1	222	200	+22	5	Quarterfinal round
2	Poland	3	2	1	213	178	+35	5	Quarterfinal round
3	Russia	3	2	1	197	201	−4	5	Classification round for 9th–16th place
4	Germany	3	0	3	164	217	−53	3	Classification round for 9th–16th place

Source: FIBA Archive

1 July 2005

Boxscore

Germany	65–77	Italy

1 July 2005

Boxscore

Poland	65–70	Russia

2 July 2005

Boxscore

Russia	62–51	Germany

2 July 2005

Boxscore

Italy	60–70	Poland

3 July 2005

Boxscore

Germany	48–78	Poland

3 July 2005

Boxscore

Russia	65–85	Italy

=== Group D ===
Pos	Team	Pld	W	L	PF	PA	PD	Pts	Qualification
1	France	3	3	0	246	154	+92	6	Quarterfinal round
2	Greece	3	2	1	189	189	0	5	Quarterfinal round
3	Finland	3	1	2	189	214	−25	4	Classification round for 9th–16th place
4	Belgium	3	0	3	175	242	−67	3	Classification round for 9th–16th place

Source: FIBA Archive

1 July 2005

Boxscore

Greece	74–62	Belgium

1 July 2005

Boxscore

Finland	53–87	France

2 July 2005

Boxscore

France	71–58	Greece

2 July 2005

Boxscore

Belgium	70–80	Finland

3 July 2005

Boxscore

Greece	57–56	Finland

3 July 2005

Boxscore

France	88–43	Belgium

== Quarterfinal round ==
In this round, the teams play in two groups of four. The first two teams from each group advance to the semifinals, the other teams will play in the 5th–8th place playoffs.

=== Group E ===
Pos	Team	Pld	W	L	PF	PA	PD	Pts	Qualification
1	Latvia	3	3	0	208	158	+50	6	Semifinals
2	Greece	3	2	1	155	175	−20	5	Semifinals
3	Croatia	3	1	2	177	198	−21	4	5th–8th place playoffs
4	Italy	3	0	3	192	201	−9	3	5th–8th place playoffs

Source: FIBA Archive

5 July 2005

Boxscore

Croatia	49–51	Greece

5 July 2005

Boxscore

Latvia	66–61	Italy

6 July 2005

Boxscore

Italy	70–71	Croatia

6 July 2005

Boxscore

Greece	40–65	Latvia

7 July 2005

Boxscore

Croatia	57–77	Latvia

7 July 2005

Boxscore

Italy	61–64	Greece

=== Group F ===
Pos	Team	Pld	W	L	PF	PA	PD	Pts	Qualification
1	France	3	3	0	239	226	+13	6	Semifinals
2	Poland	3	2	1	225	207	+18	5	Semifinals
3	Ukraine	3	1	2	246	251	−5	4	5th–8th place playoffs
4	Spain	3	0	3	205	231	−26	3	5th–8th place playoffs

Source: FIBA Archive

5 July 2005

Boxscore

Spain	77–81	France

5 July 2005

Boxscore

Ukraine	80–92	Poland

6 July 2005

Boxscore

Poland	66–52	Spain

6 July 2005

Boxscore

France	83–82	Ukraine

7 July 2005

Boxscore

Spain	76–84	Ukraine

7 July 2005

Boxscore

Poland	67–75	France

== Classification round for 9th–16th place ==
In this round, the teams play in two groups of four. The first two teams from each group advance to the 9th–12th place playoffs, the other teams will play in the 13th–16th place playoffs.

=== Group G ===
Pos	Team	Pld	W	L	PF	PA	PD	Pts	Qualification
1	Russia	3	2	1	253	223	+30	5	9th–12th place playoffs
2	Czech Republic	3	2	1	213	204	+9	5	9th–12th place playoffs
3	Turkey	3	2	1	214	223	−9	5	13th–16th place playoffs
4	Belgium	3	0	3	187	217	−30	3	13th–16th place playoffs

Source: [ FIBA Archive]

5 July 2005

Boxscore

Czech Republic	71–65	Belgium

5 July 2005

Boxscore

Turkey	93–89	Russia

6 July 2005

Boxscore

Russia	86–71	Czech Republic

6 July 2005

Boxscore

Belgium	63–68	Turkey

7 July 2005

Boxscore

Czech Republic	71–53	Turkey

7 July 2005

Boxscore

Russia	78–59	Belgium

=== Group H ===
Pos	Team	Pld	W	L	PF	PA	PD	Pts	Qualification
1	Hungary	3	3	0	189	140	+49	6	9th–12th place playoffs
2	Germany	3	2	1	212	184	+28	5	9th–12th place playoffs
3	Romania	3	1	2	174	213	−39	4	13th–16th place playoffs
4	Finland	3	0	3	178	216	−38	3	13th–16th place playoffs

Source: [ FIBA Archive]

5 July 2005

Boxscore

Romania	82–64	Finland

5 July 2005

Boxscore

Hungary	66–52	Germany

6 July 2005

Boxscore

Germany	80–55	Romania

6 July 2005

Boxscore

Finland	51–54	Hungary

7 July 2005

Boxscore

Romania	37–69	Hungary

7 July 2005

Boxscore

Germany	80–63	Finland

== 13th–16th place playoffs ==
13th–16th place semifinals
G3	Turkey	82
H4	Finland	54
G4	Belgium	91
H3	Romania	78

13th place match
G3	Turkey	82
G4	Belgium	58
15th place match
H4	Finland	83
H3	Romania	51

=== 13th–16th place semifinals ===
9 July 2005

Boxscore

Turkey	82–54	Finland

9 July 2005

Boxscore

Belgium	91–78	Romania

=== 15th place match ===
10 July 2005

Boxscore

Finland	83–51	Romania

=== 13th place match ===
10 July 2005

Boxscore

Turkey	82–58	Belgium

== 9th–12th place playoffs ==
9th–12th place semifinals
G1	Russia	60
H2	Germany	74
G2	Czech Republic	73
H1	Hungary	53

9th place match
H2	Germany	64
G2	Czech Republic	53
11th place match
G1	Russia	70
H1	Hungary	40

=== 9th–12th place semifinals ===
9 July 2005

Boxscore

Russia	60–74	Germany

9 July 2005

Boxscore

Czech Republic	73–53	Hungary

=== 11th place match ===
10 July 2005

Boxscore

Russia	70–40	Hungary

=== 9th place match ===
10 July 2005

Germany	64–53	Czech Republic

== 5th–8th place playoffs ==
5th–8th place semifinals
E3	Croatia	57
F4	Spain	45
E4	Italy	83
F3	Ukraine	80

5th place match
E3	Croatia	67
E4	Italy	56
7th place match
F4	Spain	75
F3	Ukraine	85

=== 5th–8th place semifinals ===
9 July 2005

Boxscore

Croatia	57–45	Spain

9 July 2005

Boxscore

Italy	83–80	Ukraine

=== 7th place match ===
10 July 2005

Boxscore

Spain	75–85	Ukraine

=== 5th place match ===
10 July 2005

Boxscore

Croatia	67–56	Italy

== Championship playoffs ==
Semifinals
E1	Latvia	53
F2	Poland	55
E2	Greece	44
F1	France	69

Finals
F2	Poland	57
F1	France	72
3rd place match
E1	Latvia	65
E2	Greece	36

=== Semifinals ===
9 July 2005

Boxscore

Latvia	53–55	Poland

9 July 2005

Boxscore

Greece	44–69	France

=== 3rd place match ===
10 July 2005

Boxscore

Latvia	65–36	Greece

=== Final ===
10 July 2005

Boxscore

Poland	57–72	France

== Final standings ==
Team relegated to the 2006 FIBA Europe Under-20 Championship for Women Division B (In fact, Croatia and Romania did not participate in 2006)

Rank	Team
1st place, gold medalist(s)	France
2nd place, silver medalist(s)	Poland
3rd place, bronze medalist(s)	Latvia
4	Greece
5	Croatia
6	Italy
7	Ukraine
8	Spain
9	Germany
10	Czech Republic
11	Russia
12	Hungary
13	Turkey
14	Belgium
15	Finland
16	Romania
