= Finland women's national under-20 basketball team =

Youth basketball team representing Finland

Finland
- FIBA zone: FIBA Europe
- National federation: Basketball Finland

U20 EuroBasket
- Appearances: 6
- Medals: None

U20 EuroBasket Division B
- Appearances: 1
- Medals: (silver) Silver: 1 (2019)

The Finland women's national under-20 basketball team is a national basketball team of Finland, administered by the Basketball Finland. It represents the country in women's international under-20 basketball competitions.

== FIBA U20 Women's EuroBasket participations ==
Year	Division A	Division B
(Slovakia) 2000	DNQ	-
(Croatia) 2002	DNQ	-
(France) 2004	11th	-
(Czech Republic) 2005	15th	-
(Hungary) 2006	16th	-
(Kosovo) 2019	-	2nd place, silver medalist(s)
(Hungary) 2022	9th	-
(Lithuania) 2023	9th	-
(Lithuania) 2024	16th	-

== See also ==
- Finland women's national basketball team
- Finland women's national under-18 basketball team
- Finland men's national under-20 basketball team
