= 2017 FIBA U20 Women's European Championship Division B =

Tournament details
- Host country: Israel
- City: Eilat
- Dates: 8–16 July 2017
- Teams: 12 (from 1 confederation)
- Venue: 1 (in 1 host city)

Final positions
- Champions: Germany (2nd title)
- Runners-up: Slovakia
- Third place: Croatia

Official website
- www.fiba.basketball

The 2017 FIBA U20 Women's European Championship Division B was the 13th edition of the Division B of the Women's European basketball championship for national under-20 teams. It was held in Eilat, Israel, from 8 to 16 July 2017. Germany women's national under-20 basketball team won the tournament.

== Participating teams ==
- Belarus
- Croatia
- Czech Republic
- Germany ▼ (16th place, 2016 FIBA U20 Women's European Championship Division A)
- Great Britain
- Greece ▼ (14th place, 2016 FIBA U20 Women's European Championship Division A)
- Iceland
- Ireland
- Israel
- Romania
- Slovakia ▼ (15th place, 2016 FIBA U20 Women's European Championship Division A)
- Ukraine

== First round ==
In the first round, the teams were drawn into two groups of six. The first two teams from each group advance to the semifinals, the third and fourth teams advance to the 5th–8th place playoffs, the other teams will play in the 9th–12th place playoffs.

=== Group A ===
| Pos | Team | Pld | W | L | PF | PA | PD | Pts | Qualification |
|---|---|---|---|---|---|---|---|---|---|
| 1 | Slovakia | 5 | 4 | 1 | 294 | 223 | +71 | 9 | Semifinals |
| 2 | Germany | 5 | 4 | 1 | 288 | 270 | +18 | 9 | Semifinals |
| 3 | Czech Republic | 5 | 3 | 2 | 318 | 304 | +14 | 8 | 5th–8th place playoffs |
| 4 | Greece | 5 | 3 | 2 | 332 | 298 | +34 | 8 | 5th–8th place playoffs |
| 5 | Ukraine | 5 | 1 | 4 | 293 | 321 | −28 | 6 | 9th–12th place playoffs |
| 6 | Iceland | 5 | 0 | 5 | 212 | 321 | −109 | 5 | 9th–12th place playoffs |

Source: FIBA

8 July 2017

Boxscore

| Ukraine | 60–61 | Germany |

8 July 2017

Boxscore

| Greece | 72–42 | Iceland |

8 July 2017

Boxscore

| Slovakia | 62–56 | Czech Republic |

9 July 2017

Boxscore

| Germany | 67–65 | Greece |

9 July 2017

Boxscore

| Czech Republic | 79–60 | Ukraine |

9 July 2017

Boxscore

| Iceland | 36–68 | Slovakia |

10 July 2017

Boxscore

| Czech Republic | 53–65 | Germany |

10 July 2017

Boxscore

| Slovakia | 51–52 | Greece |

10 July 2017

Boxscore

| Ukraine | 73–54 | Iceland |

12 July 2017

Boxscore

| Germany | 42–56 | Slovakia |

12 July 2017

Boxscore

| Iceland | 44–55 | Czech Republic |

12 July 2017

Boxscore

| Greece | 70–63 | Ukraine |

13 July 2017

Boxscore

| Iceland | 36–53 | Germany |

13 July 2017

Boxscore

| Ukraine | 37–57 | Slovakia |

13 July 2017

Boxscore

| Czech Republic | 75–73 | Greece |

=== Group B ===
| Pos | Team | Pld | W | L | PF | PA | PD | Pts | Qualification |
|---|---|---|---|---|---|---|---|---|---|
| 1 | Croatia | 5 | 4 | 1 | 365 | 280 | +85 | 9 | Semifinals |
| 2 | Belarus | 5 | 4 | 1 | 355 | 312 | +43 | 9 | Semifinals |
| 3 | Israel | 5 | 4 | 1 | 353 | 290 | +63 | 9 | 5th–8th place playoffs |
| 4 | Great Britain | 5 | 2 | 3 | 289 | 324 | −35 | 7 | 5th–8th place playoffs |
| 5 | Romania | 5 | 1 | 4 | 305 | 341 | −36 | 6 | 9th–12th place playoffs |
| 6 | Ireland | 5 | 0 | 5 | 248 | 368 | −120 | 5 | 9th–12th place playoffs |

Source: FIBA

8 July 2017

Boxscore

| Belarus | 70–68 | Romania |

8 July 2017

Boxscore

| Great Britain | 69–46 | Ireland |

8 July 2017

Boxscore

| Israel | 51–65 | Croatia |

9 July 2017

Boxscore

| Romania | 48–74 | Great Britain |

9 July 2017

Boxscore

| Croatia | 72–79 | Belarus |

9 July 2017

Boxscore

| Ireland | 50–79 | Israel |

10 July 2017

Boxscore

| Croatia | 73–63 | Romania |

10 July 2017

Boxscore

| Israel | 88–50 | Great Britain |

10 July 2017

Boxscore

| Belarus | 68–42 | Ireland |

12 July 2017

Boxscore

| Romania | 57–63 | Israel |

12 July 2017

Boxscore

| Ireland | 49–83 | Croatia |

12 July 2017

Boxscore

| Great Britain | 58–70 | Belarus |

13 July 2017

Boxscore

| Ireland | 61–69 | Romania |

13 July 2017

Boxscore

| Belarus | 68–72 | Israel |

13 July 2017

Boxscore

| Croatia | 72–38 | Great Britain |

== 9th–12th place playoffs ==
9th–12th place semifinals
A5 | Ukraine | 82
B6 | Ireland | 63
B5 | Romania | 56
A6 | Iceland | 44

9th place match
A5 | Ukraine | 92
B5 | Romania | 65
11th place match
B6 | Ireland | 54
A6 | Iceland | 64

=== 9th–12th place semifinals ===
15 July 2017

Boxscore

| Ukraine | 82–63 | Ireland |

15 July 2017

Boxscore

| Romania | 56–44 | Iceland |

=== 11th place match ===
16 July 2017

Boxscore

| Ireland | 54–64 | Iceland |

=== 9th place match ===
16 July 2017

Boxscore

| Ukraine | 92–65 | Romania |

== 5th–8th place playoffs ==
5th–8th place semifinals
A3 | Czech Republic | 77
B4 | Great Britain | 71
B3 | Israel | 58
A4 | Greece | 71

5th place match
A3 | Czech Republic | 67
A4 | Greece | 79
7th place match
B4 | Great Britain | 49
B3 | Israel | 77

=== 5th–8th place semifinals ===
15 July 2017

Boxscore

| Czech Republic | 77–71 | Great Britain |

15 July 2017

Boxscore

| Israel | 58–71 | Greece |

=== 7th place match ===
16 July 2017

Boxscore

| Great Britain | 49–77 | Israel |

=== 5th place match ===
16 July 2017

Boxscore

| Czech Republic | 67–79 | Greece |

== Championship playoffs ==
Semifinals
A1 | Slovakia | 60
B2 | Belarus | 53
B1 | Croatia | 52
A2 | Germany | 70

Finals
A1 | Slovakia | 54
A2 | Germany | 60
3rd place match
B2 | Belarus | 51
B1 | Croatia | 60

=== Semifinals ===
15 July 2017

Boxscore

| Slovakia | 60–53 | Belarus |

15 July 2017

Boxscore

| Croatia | 52–70 | Germany |

=== 3rd place match ===
16 July 2017

Boxscore

| Belarus | 51–60 | Croatia |

=== Final ===
16 July 2017

Boxscore

| Slovakia | 54–60 | Germany |

== Final standings ==
| Rank | Team |
|---|---|
| 1st place, gold medalist(s) | Germany |
| 2nd place, silver medalist(s) | Slovakia |
| 3rd place, bronze medalist(s) | Croatia |
| 4 | Belarus |
| 5 | Greece |
| 6 | Czech Republic |
| 7 | Israel |
| 8 | Great Britain |
| 9 | Ukraine |
| 10 | Romania |
| 11 | Iceland |
| 12 | Ireland |

| Promoted to the 2018 FIBA U20 Women's European Championship Division A |
