= 2018 FIBA U20 Women's European Championship Division B =

Tournament details
- Host country: Romania
- City: Oradea
- Dates: 7–15 July 2018
- Teams: 12 (from 1 confederation)
- Venues: 2 (in 1 host city)

Final positions
- Champions: Czech Republic (1st title)
- Runners-up: Belarus
- Third place: Lithuania

Official website
- www.fiba.basketball

The 2018 FIBA U20 Women's European Championship Division B was the 14th edition of the Division B of the Women's European basketball championship for national under-20 teams. It was held in Oradea, Romania, from 7 to 15 July 2018. The Czech Republic women's national under-20 basketball team won the tournament.

== Participating teams ==
- Belarus
- Bulgaria
- Czech Republic
- Denmark
- Great Britain
- Greece
- Iceland
- Israel
- Lithuania ▼ (14th place, 2017 FIBA U20 Women's European Championship Division A)
- Romania
- Turkey ▼ (15th place, 2017 FIBA U20 Women's European Championship Division A)
- Ukraine

== First round ==
=== Group A ===
Pos	Team	Pld	W	L	PF	PA	PD	Pts	Qualification
1	Lithuania	5	4	1	354	338	+16	9	Semifinals
2	Romania	5	4	1	320	274	+46	9	Semifinals
3	Ukraine	5	3	2	361	325	+36	8	5th–8th place playoffs
4	Israel	5	2	3	328	351	−23	7	5th–8th place playoffs
5	Great Britain	5	2	3	298	322	−24	7	9th–12th place playoffs
6	Greece	5	0	5	289	340	−51	5	9th–12th place playoffs

Source: FIBA

=== Group B ===
Pos	Team	Pld	W	L	PF	PA	PD	Pts	Qualification
1	Czech Republic	5	5	0	380	293	+87	10	Semifinals
2	Belarus	5	4	1	381	304	+77	9	Semifinals
3	Bulgaria	5	3	2	331	316	+15	8	5th–8th place playoffs
4	Turkey	5	2	3	326	311	+15	7	5th–8th place playoffs
5	Iceland	5	1	4	239	396	−157	6	9th–12th place playoffs
6	Denmark	5	0	5	301	338	−37	5	9th–12th place playoffs

Source: FIBA

== 9th–12th place playoffs ==
9th–12th place semifinals
A5	Great Britain	62
B6	Denmark	61
B5	Iceland	72
A6	Greece	76

9th place match
A5	Great Britain	64
A6	Greece	72
11th place match
B6	Denmark	74
B5	Iceland	56

== 5th–8th place playoffs ==
5th–8th place semifinals
A3	Ukraine	65
B4	Turkey	73
B3	Bulgaria	63
A4	Israel	92

5th place match
B4	Turkey	71
A4	Israel	53
7th place match
A3	Ukraine	78
B3	Bulgaria	72

== Championship playoffs ==
Semifinals
A1	Lithuania	70
B2	Belarus	73
B1	Czech Republic	65
A2	Romania	62

Final
B2	Belarus	47
B1	Czech Republic	68
3rd place match
A1	Lithuania	53
A2	Romania	48

== Final standings ==
Rank	Team
1st place, gold medalist(s)	Czech Republic
2nd place, silver medalist(s)	Belarus
3rd place, bronze medalist(s)	Lithuania
4	Romania
5	Turkey
6	Israel
7	Ukraine
8	Bulgaria
9	Greece
10	Great Britain
11	Denmark
12	Iceland

Promoted to the 2019 FIBA U20 Women's European Championship Division A
