= 2006 FIBA Europe Under-20 Championship for Women =

2006 FIBA U20 Women's European Championship
5th FIBA Under-20 Women's European Basketball Championship

Tournament details
- Host country: Hungary
- Dates: 7–16 July 2006
- Teams: 16
- Venues: 2 (in 1 host city)

Final positions
- Champions: Russia (3rd title)

Official website
- www.fibaeurope.com

The 2006 FIBA Europe Under-20 Championship for Women was the fifth edition of the Women's European basketball championship for national under-20 teams. It was held in Sopron, Hungary, from 7 to 16 July 2006. Russia women's national under-20 basketball team won the tournament and became the European champions for the third time.

== Participating teams ==
- Belgium
- Bulgaria ▲ (Runners-up, 2005 FIBA Europe Under-20 Championship for Women Division B)
- Czech Republic
- Finland
- France
- Germany
- Greece
- Hungary
- Israel ▲ (Winners, 2005 FIBA Europe Under-20 Championship for Women Division B)
- Italy
- Latvia
- Poland
- Russia
- Spain
- Turkey
- Ukraine

== First round ==
In the first round, the teams were drawn into four groups of four. The first two teams from each group advance to the quarterfinal round, the other teams will play in the classification round for 9th–16th place.

=== Group A ===
Pos	Team	Pld	W	L	PF	PA	PD	Pts	Qualification
1	Bulgaria	3	3	0	192	165	+27	6	Quarterfinal round
2	Greece	3	1	2	177	170	+7	4	Quarterfinal round
3	Czech Republic	3	1	2	196	206	−10	4	Classification round for 9th–16th place
4	Finland	3	1	2	177	201	−24	4	Classification round for 9th–16th place

Source: FIBA Archive

7 July 2006

Boxscore

Bulgaria	74–60	Czech Republic

7 July 2006

Boxscore

Greece	57–60	Finland

8 July 2006

Boxscore

Finland	53–65	Bulgaria

8 July 2006

Boxscore

Czech Republic	57–68	Greece

9 July 2006

Boxscore

Bulgaria	53–52	Greece

9 July 2006

Boxscore

Finland	64–79	Czech Republic

=== Group B ===
Pos	Team	Pld	W	L	PF	PA	PD	Pts	Qualification
1	Hungary	3	3	0	233	195	+38	6	Quarterfinal round
2	France	3	2	1	229	197	+32	5	Quarterfinal round
3	Ukraine	3	1	2	219	255	−36	4	Classification round for 9th–16th place
4	Israel	3	0	3	173	207	−34	3	Classification round for 9th–16th place

Source: FIBA Archive

7 July 2006

Boxscore

Israel	62–68	Hungary

7 July 2006

Boxscore

France	95–81	Ukraine

8 July 2006

Boxscore

Ukraine	75–68	Israel

8 July 2006

Boxscore

Hungary	73–70	France

9 July 2006

Boxscore

Israel	43–64	France

9 July 2006

Boxscore

Ukraine	63–92	Hungary

=== Group C ===
Pos	Team	Pld	W	L	PF	PA	PD	Pts	Qualification
1	Spain	3	2	1	211	191	+20	5	Quarterfinal round
2	Russia	3	2	1	207	183	+24	5	Quarterfinal round
3	Poland	3	1	2	183	212	−29	4	Classification round for 9th–16th place
4	Turkey	3	1	2	194	209	−15	4	Classification round for 9th–16th place

Source: FIBA Archive

7 July 2006

Boxscore

Turkey	60–65	Russia

7 July 2006

Boxscore

Poland	54–73	Spain

8 July 2006

Boxscore

Spain	72–74	Turkey

8 July 2006

Boxscore

Russia	79–57	Poland

9 July 2006

Boxscore

Turkey	60–72	Poland

9 July 2006

Boxscore

Spain	66–63	Russia

=== Group D ===
Pos	Team	Pld	W	L	PF	PA	PD	Pts	Qualification
1	Belgium	3	2	1	197	195	+2	5	Quarterfinal round
2	Germany	3	2	1	188	167	+21	5	Quarterfinal round
3	Italy	3	1	2	180	196	−16	4	Classification round for 9th–16th place
4	Latvia	3	1	2	197	204	−7	4	Classification round for 9th–16th place

Source: FIBA Archive

7 July 2006

Boxscore

Belgium	62–45	Germany

7 July 2006

Boxscore

Latvia	59–63	Italy

8 July 2006

Boxscore

Italy	64–75	Belgium

8 July 2006

Boxscore

Germany	81–52	Latvia

9 July 2006

Boxscore

Belgium	60–86	Latvia

9 July 2006

Boxscore

Italy	53–62	Germany

== Quarterfinal round ==
In this round, the teams play in two groups of four. The first two teams from each group advance to the semifinals, the other teams will play in the 5th–8th place playoffs.

=== Group E ===
Pos	Team	Pld	W	L	PF	PA	PD	Pts	Qualification
1	France	3	2	1	226	194	+32	5	Semifinals
2	Spain	3	2	1	193	172	+21	5	Semifinals
3	Germany	3	1	2	173	217	−44	4	5th–8th place playoffs
4	Bulgaria	3	1	2	185	194	−9	4	5th–8th place playoffs

Source: FIBA Archive

11 July 2006

Boxscore

Bulgaria	57–68	Germany

11 July 2006

Boxscore

France	70–63	Spain

12 July 2006

Boxscore

Spain	61–56	Bulgaria

12 July 2006

Boxscore

Germany	59–91	France

13 July 2006

Boxscore

Bulgaria	72–65	France

13 July 2006

Boxscore

Spain	69–46	Germany

=== Group F ===
Pos	Team	Pld	W	L	PF	PA	PD	Pts	Qualification
1	Russia	3	3	0	234	154	+80	6	Semifinals
2	Hungary	3	2	1	192	208	−16	5	Semifinals
3	Belgium	3	1	2	179	211	−32	4	5th–8th place playoffs
4	Greece	3	0	3	160	192	−32	3	5th–8th place playoffs

Source: FIBA Archive

11 July 2006

Boxscore

Greece	56–58	Belgium

11 July 2006

Boxscore

Hungary	55–82	Russia

12 July 2006

Boxscore

Russia	71–46	Greece

12 July 2006

Boxscore

Belgium	68–74	Hungary

13 July 2006

Boxscore

Greece	58–63	Hungary

13 July 2006

Boxscore

Russia	81–53	Belgium

== Classification round for 9th–16th place ==
In this round, the teams play in two groups of four. The first two teams from each group advance to the 9th–12th place playoffs, the other teams will play in the 13th–16th place playoffs.

=== Group G ===
Pos	Team	Pld	W	L	PF	PA	PD	Pts	Qualification
1	Latvia	3	3	0	204	178	+26	6	9th–12th place playoffs
2	Czech Republic	3	2	1	209	196	+13	5	9th–12th place playoffs
3	Israel	3	1	2	206	203	+3	4	13th–16th place playoffs
4	Poland	3	0	3	182	224	−42	3	13th–16th place playoffs

Source: FIBA Archive

11 July 2006

Boxscore

Czech Republic	59–65	Latvia

11 July 2006

Boxscore

Israel	77–61	Poland

12 July 2006

Boxscore

Poland	66–77	Czech Republic

12 July 2006

Boxscore

Latvia	69–64	Israel

13 July 2006

Boxscore

Czech Republic	73–65	Israel

13 July 2006

Boxscore

Poland	55–70	Latvia

=== Group H ===
Pos	Team	Pld	W	L	PF	PA	PD	Pts	Qualification
1	Turkey	3	3	0	255	194	+61	6	9th–12th place playoffs
2	Italy	3	2	1	211	207	+4	5	9th–12th place playoffs
3	Ukraine	3	1	2	236	251	−15	4	13th–16th place playoffs
4	Finland	3	0	3	179	229	−50	3	13th–16th place playoffs

Source: FIBA Archive

11 July 2006

Boxscore

Finland	54–62	Italy

11 July 2006

Boxscore

Ukraine	79–92	Turkey

12 July 2006

Boxscore

Turkey	88–58	Finland

12 July 2006

Boxscore

Italy	92–78	Ukraine

13 July 2006

Boxscore

Finland	67–79	Ukraine

13 July 2006

Boxscore

Turkey	75–57	Italy

== 13th–16th place playoffs ==
13th–16th place semifinals
G3	Israel	83
H4	Finland	60
G4	Poland	61
H3	Ukraine	80

13th place match
G3	Israel	58
H3	Ukraine	77
15th place match
H4	Finland	61
G4	Poland	90

=== 13th–16th place semifinals ===
15 July 2006

Boxscore

Israel	83–60	Finland

15 July 2006

Boxscore

Poland	61–80	Ukraine

=== 15th place match ===
16 July 2006

Boxscore

Finland	61–90	Poland

=== 13th place match ===
16 July 2006

Boxscore

Israel	58–77	Ukraine

== 9th–12th place playoffs ==
9th–12th place semifinals
G1	Latvia	49
H2	Italy	64
G2	Czech Republic	70
H1	Turkey	66

9th place match
H2	Italy	53
G2	Czech Republic	51
11th place match
G1	Latvia	65
H1	Turkey	71

=== 9th–12th place semifinals ===
15 July 2006

Boxscore

Latvia	49–64	Italy

15 July 2006

Boxscore

Czech Republic	70–66	Turkey

=== 11th place match ===
16 July 2006

Boxscore

Latvia	65–71	Turkey

=== 9th place match ===
16 July 2006

Boxscore

Italy	53–51	Czech Republic

== 5th–8th place playoffs ==
5th–8th place semifinals
E3	Germany	61
F4	Greece	54
E4	Bulgaria	81
F3	Belgium	84

5th place match
E3	Germany	72
F3	Belgium	76
7th place match
F4	Greece	63
E4	Bulgaria	73

=== 5th–8th place semifinals ===
15 July 2006

Boxscore

Germany	61–54	Greece

15 July 2006

Boxscore

Bulgaria	81–84	Belgium

=== 7th place match ===
16 July 2006

Boxscore

Greece	63–73	Bulgaria

=== 5th place match ===
16 July 2006

Boxscore

Germany	72–76	Belgium

== Championship playoffs ==
Semifinals
E1	France	85
F2	Hungary	87
E2	Spain	73
F1	Russia	80

Finals
F2	Hungary	68
F1	Russia	77
3rd place match
E1	France	64
E2	Spain	55

=== Semifinals ===
15 July 2006

Boxscore

France	85–87	Hungary

15 July 2006

Boxscore

Spain	73–80	Russia

=== 3rd place match ===
16 July 2006

Boxscore

France	64–55	Spain

=== Final ===
16 July 2006

Boxscore

Hungary	68–77	Russia

== Final standings ==
Team qualified for the 2007 FIBA Under-21 World Championship for Women
Team relegated to the 2007 FIBA Europe Under-20 Championship for Women Division B

Rank	Team
1st place, gold medalist(s)	Russia
2nd place, silver medalist(s)	Hungary
3rd place, bronze medalist(s)	France
4	Spain
5	Belgium
6	Germany
7	Bulgaria
8	Greece
9	Italy
10	Czech Republic
11	Turkey
12	Latvia
13	Ukraine
14	Israel
15	Poland
16	Finland
