= England national basketball team =

England national basketball team may refer to:

- England men's national basketball team
- England women's national basketball team
- England men's national under-18 basketball team
- England men's national under-16 basketball team
- England women's national under-20 basketball team
- England women's national under-18 basketball team
- England women's national under-16 basketball team
