= 2005 FIBA Europe Under-20 Championship for Women Division B =

Tournament details
- Host country: Druskininkai
- City: Lithuania
- Dates: 1–8 July 2005
- Teams: 7 (from 1 confederation)
- Venue: 1 (in 1 host city)

Final positions
- Champions: Israel (1st title)
- Runners-up: Bulgaria
- Third place: Lithuania

The 2005 FIBA Europe Under-20 Championship for Women Division B was the first edition of the Division B of the Women's European basketball championship for national under-20 teams. It was held in Druskininkai, Lithuania, from 1 to 8 July 2005. Israel women's national under-20 basketball team won the tournament.

== Participating teams ==
- Bulgaria
- Ireland
- Israel
- Lithuania
- Portugal
- Slovenia
- Sweden

== Final standings ==
| Pos | Team | Pld | W | L | PF | PA | PD | Pts | Promotion |
|---|---|---|---|---|---|---|---|---|---|
| 1 | Israel | 6 | 6 | 0 | 421 | 350 | +71 | 12 | Promoted to the 2006 FIBA Europe Under-20 Championship for Women Division A |
| 2 | Bulgaria | 6 | 5 | 1 | 403 | 333 | +70 | 11 | Promoted to the 2006 FIBA Europe Under-20 Championship for Women Division A |
| 3 | Lithuania | 6 | 4 | 2 | 406 | 354 | +52 | 10 | |
| 4 | Slovenia | 6 | 3 | 3 | 338 | 320 | +18 | 9 | |
| 5 | Sweden | 6 | 2 | 4 | 346 | 342 | +4 | 8 | |
| 6 | Ireland | 6 | 1 | 5 | 340 | 446 | −106 | 7 | |
| 7 | Portugal | 6 | 0 | 6 | 301 | 410 | −109 | 6 | |

Source: FIBA Archive

== Results ==
1 July 2005

Boxscore

| Portugal | 51–75 | Israel |

1 July 2005

Boxscore

| Slovenia | 74–53 | Ireland |

1 July 2005

Boxscore

| Bulgaria | 81–51 | Lithuania |

2 July 2005

Boxscore

| Israel | 60–53 | Slovenia |

2 July 2005

Boxscore

| Sweden | 41–57 | Bulgaria |

2 July 2005

Boxscore

| Lithuania | 80–56 | Portugal |

3 July 2005

Boxscore

| Ireland | 53–76 | Israel |

3 July 2005

Boxscore

| Portugal | 38–58 | Sweden |

3 July 2005

Boxscore

| Slovenia | 42–65 | Lithuania |

4 July 2005

Boxscore

| Bulgaria | 68–57 | Portugal |

4 July 2005

Boxscore

| Sweden | 57–65 | Slovenia |

4 July 2005

Boxscore

| Lithuania | 87–60 | Ireland |

6 July 2005

Boxscore

| Bulgaria | 49–42 | Slovenia |

6 July 2005

Boxscore

| Ireland | 43–69 | Sweden |

6 July 2005

Boxscore

| Israel | 60–56 | Lithuania |

7 July 2005

Boxscore

| Bulgaria | 77–64 | Ireland |

7 July 2005

Boxscore

| Portugal | 36–62 | Slovenia |

7 July 2005

Boxscore

| Sweden | 66–72 | Israel |

8 July 2005

Boxscore

| Portugal | 63–67 | Ireland |

8 July 2005

Boxscore

| Israel | 78–71 | Bulgaria |

8 July 2005

Boxscore

| Lithuania | 67–55 | Sweden |
