= 2019 FIBA U20 Women's European Championship Division B =

Tournament details
- Host country: Kosovo
- City: Pristina
- Dates: 3–11 August 2019
- Teams: 12 (from 1 confederation)
- Venues: 2 (in 1 host city)

Final positions
- Champions: Bulgaria (1st title)
- Runners-up: Finland
- Third place: Ireland

Tournament statistics
- MVP: (Finland) Lotta Vehka-aho
- Top scorer: (Finland) Lotta Vehka-aho (25.2 ppg)
- Top rebounds: (Croatia) Josipa Pavić (12.8 rpg)
- Top assists: (Israel) Dor Saar (5.3 apg)

Official website
- www.fiba.basketball

The 2019 FIBA U20 Women's European Championship was the 15th edition of the Women's European basketball championship Division B for national under-20 teams. Held from 3 to 11 August in Pristina, Kosovo, 12 teams participated in the tournament.

== Venues ==
Pristina		2019 FIBA U20 Women's European Championship Division B is located in Kosovo
1 Tetori	2,000	2019 FIBA U20 Women's European Championship Division B is located in Kosovo
Palace of Youth and Sports	2,500	2019 FIBA U20 Women's European Championship Division B is located in Kosovo

== Participating teams ==
- Bulgaria
- Croatia ▼ (16th place, 2018 FIBA U20 Women's European Championship)
- Finland
- Great Britain
- Greece
- Iceland
- Ireland
- Israel
- Kosovo (host)
- Romania
- Turkey
- Ukraine

== First round ==
The draw took place on 13 December 2018 in Belgrade, Serbia.

=== Group A ===
Pos	Team	Pld	W	L	PF	PA	PD	Pts	Qualification
1	Croatia	2	2	0	134	104	+30	4	Second round
2	Israel	2	1	1	127	121	+6	3	Second round
3	Iceland	2	0	2	118	154	−36	2	9th–12th place classification

Source: FIBA

=== Group B ===
Pos	Team	Pld	W	L	PF	PA	PD	Pts	Qualification
1	Ireland	2	2	0	135	111	+24	4	Second round
2	Great Britain	2	1	1	116	125	−9	3	Second round
3	Ukraine	2	0	2	106	121	−15	2	9th–12th place classification

Source: FIBA

=== Group C ===
Pos	Team	Pld	W	L	PF	PA	PD	Pts	Qualification
1	Turkey	2	2	0	167	118	+49	4	Second round
2	Romania	2	1	1	169	127	+42	3	Second round
3	Kosovo (H)	2	0	2	96	187	−91	2	9th–12th place classification

Source: FIBA
(H) Hosts

=== Group D ===
Pos	Team	Pld	W	L	PF	PA	PD	Pts	Qualification
1	Finland	2	2	0	151	98	+53	4	Second round
2	Bulgaria	2	1	1	105	128	−23	3	Second round
3	Greece	2	0	2	115	145	−30	2	9th–12th place classification

Source: FIBA

== Second round ==
=== Group E ===
Pos	Team	Pld	W	L	PF	PA	PD	Pts	Qualification
1	Ireland	3	2	1	193	172	+21	5	Semifinals
2	Great Britain	3	2	1	214	186	+28	5	Semifinals
3	Croatia	3	1	2	178	204	−26	4	5th–8th place playoffs
4	Israel	3	1	2	157	180	−23	4	5th–8th place playoffs

Source: FIBA

=== Group F ===
Pos	Team	Pld	W	L	PF	PA	PD	Pts	Qualification
1	Finland	3	3	0	223	139	+84	6	Semifinals
2	Bulgaria	3	2	1	193	201	−8	5	Semifinals
3	Turkey	3	1	2	191	201	−10	4	5th–8th place playoffs
4	Romania	3	0	3	187	253	−66	3	5th–8th place playoffs

Source: FIBA

== 9th–12th place classification ==
=== Group G ===
Pos	Team	Pld	W	L	PF	PA	PD	Pts
9	Ukraine	3	3	0	207	126	+81	6
10	Iceland	3	2	1	211	179	+32	5
11	Greece	3	1	2	179	174	+5	4
12	Kosovo (H)	3	0	3	152	270	−118	3

Source: FIBA
(H) Hosts

== Knockout stage ==
=== 5th–8th place playoffs ===
5th–8th place semifinals
E3	Croatia	72
F4	Romania	69
F3	Turkey	80
E4	Israel	83

5th place match
E3	Croatia	61
E4	Israel	70
7th place match
F4	Romania	56
F3	Turkey	86

==== 5th–8th place semifinals ====
10 August 2019
16:30

Croatia	72–69 (OT)	Romania
Scoring by quarter: 12–20, 13–15, 26–13, 16–19, Overtime: 5–2

10 August 2019
19:00

Turkey	80–83	Israel
Scoring by quarter: 23–18, 17–17, 18–19, 22–29

==== 7th place game ====
11 August 2019
16:30

Romania	56–86	Turkey
Scoring by quarter: 8–22, 6–28, 15–18, 27–18

==== 5th place game ====
11 August 2019
14:00

Croatia	61–70	Israel
Scoring by quarter: 16–20, 20–15, 10–19, 15–16

=== Championship playoffs ===
Semifinals
E1	Ireland	58
F2	Bulgaria	68
F1	Finland	86
E2	Great Britain	68

Final
F2	Bulgaria	80
F1	Finland	75
3rd place match
E1	Ireland	60
E2	Great Britain	57

==== Semifinals ====
10 August 2019
16:30

Ireland	58–68	Bulgaria
Scoring by quarter: 14–21, 15–13, 14–16, 15–18

10 August 2019
19:00

Finland	86–68	Great Britain
Scoring by quarter: 18–19, 17–20, 32–14, 19–15

==== 3rd place game ====
11 August 2019
16:30

Ireland	60–57	Great Britain
Scoring by quarter: 22–7, 19–17, 9–20, 10–13

==== Final ====
11 August 2019
19:00

Boxscore

Bulgaria	80–75	Finland
Scoring by quarter: 17–24, 25–12, 17–22, 21–17

Pallati i Rinise dhe Sporteve Prishtina, Pristina
Attendance: 200
Referees: Nikola Perlić (CRO), Silvia Marziali (ITA), Ozge Sentürk (TUR)

== Final standings ==
Rank	Team	Record
1st place, gold medalist(s)	Bulgaria	5–1
2nd place, silver medalist(s)	Finland	5–1
3rd place, bronze medalist(s)	Ireland	4–2
4	Great Britain	3–3
5	Israel	4–2
6	Croatia	3–3
7	Turkey	3–3
8	Romania	1–5
9	Ukraine	3–2
10	Iceland	2–3
11	Greece	1–4
12	Kosovo (H)	0–5

Promoted to the 2022 FIBA U20 Women's European Championship Division A

=== Awards ===
Most Valuable Player
(Finland) Lotta Vehka-aho

All-Tournament Team

- (Bulgaria) Karina Konstantinova
- (Finland) Awak Kuier
- (Finland) Lotta Vehka-aho (MVP)
- (United Kingdom) Holly Winterburn
- (Republic of Ireland) Claire Melia
