= 2008 FIBA Europe Under-20 Championship for Women Division B =

Tournament details
- Host country: Poland
- City: Poznań
- Dates: 11–20 July 2008
- Teams: 10 (from 1 confederation)
- Venue: 1 (in 1 host city)

Final positions
- Champions: Sweden (1st title)
- Runners-up: Poland
- Third place: Hungary

Official website
- www.fibaeurope.com

The 2008 FIBA Europe Under-20 Championship for Women Division B was the fourth edition of the Division B of the Women's European basketball championship for national under-20 teams. It was held in Poznań, Poland, from 11 to 20 July 2008. Sweden women's national under-20 basketball team won the tournament.

== Participating teams ==
- Great Britain
- Hungary ▼ (16th place, 2007 FIBA Europe Under-20 Championship for Women Division A)
- Ireland
- Israel ▼ (15th place, 2007 FIBA Europe Under-20 Championship for Women Division A)
- Netherlands
- Poland
- Portugal
- Romania
- Slovakia
- Sweden

== First round ==
In the first round, the teams were drawn into two groups of five. The first four teams from each group advance to the quarterfinals, the last teams will play for the 9th place.

=== Group A ===
Pos	Team	Pld	W	L	PF	PA	PD	Pts	Qualification
1	Slovakia	4	3	1	297	202	+95	7	Quarterfinals
2	Hungary	4	3	1	238	172	+66	7	Quarterfinals
3	Romania	4	3	1	227	205	+22	7	Quarterfinals
4	Ireland	4	1	3	226	310	−84	5	Quarterfinals
5	Great Britain	4	0	4	200	299	−99	4	9th place playoff

Source: FIBA Archive

11 July 2008

Boxscore

Ireland	44–80	Hungary

11 July 2008

Boxscore

Romania	43–62	Slovakia

12 July 2008

Boxscore

Great Britain	61–69	Romania

12 July 2008

Boxscore

Slovakia	90–57	Ireland

13 July 2008

Boxscore

Hungary	64–52	Slovakia

13 July 2008

Boxscore

Ireland	78–66	Great Britain

15 July 2008

Boxscore

Romania	74–47	Ireland

15 July 2008

Boxscore

Great Britain	35–59	Hungary

16 July 2008

Boxscore

Slovakia	93–38	Great Britain

16 July 2008

Boxscore

Hungary	35–41	Romania

=== Group B ===
Pos	Team	Pld	W	L	PF	PA	PD	Pts	Qualification
1	Sweden	4	4	0	285	208	+77	8	Quarterfinals
2	Poland	4	3	1	298	220	+78	7	Quarterfinals
3	Netherlands	4	2	2	232	243	−11	6	Quarterfinals
4	Israel	4	1	3	205	276	−71	5	Quarterfinals
5	Portugal	4	0	4	212	285	−73	4	9th place playoff

Source: FIBA Archive

11 July 2008

Boxscore

Portugal	52–70	Sweden

11 July 2008

Boxscore

Israel	59–86	Poland

12 July 2008

Boxscore

Netherlands	61–47	Israel

12 July 2008

Boxscore

Poland	89–38	Portugal

13 July 2008

Boxscore

Sweden	69–66	Poland

13 July 2008

Boxscore

Portugal	66–69	Netherlands

15 July 2008

Boxscore

Israel	57–56	Portugal

15 July 2008

Boxscore

Netherlands	48–73	Sweden

16 July 2008

Boxscore

Poland	57–54	Netherlands

16 July 2008

Boxscore

Sweden	73–42	Israel

== 9th place playoff ==
18 July 2008

Boxscore

Great Britain	44–59	Portugal

19 July 2008

Boxscore

Portugal	69–57	Great Britain

== Championship playoffs ==
Fifth place
B3	Netherlands	46
A3	Romania	66
Seventh place
A4	Ireland	64
B4	Israel	55

Consolation semifinals
A4	Ireland	43
B3	Netherlands	61
B4	Israel	64
A3	Romania	77

Quarterfinals
B1	Sweden	81
A4	Ireland	47
A2	Hungary	61
B3	Netherlands	52
A1	Slovakia	83
B4	Israel	54
B2	Poland	59
A3	Romania	53

Semifinals
B1	Sweden	94
A2	Hungary	52
A1	Slovakia	41
B2	Poland	60

Final
B1	Sweden	64
B2	Poland	60
Third place
A2	Hungary	56
A1	Slovakia	54

=== Quarterfinals ===
18 July 2008

Boxscore

Hungary	61–52	Netherlands

18 July 2008

Boxscore

Poland	59–53	Romania

18 July 2008

Boxscore

Slovakia	83–54	Israel

18 July 2008

Boxscore

Sweden	81–47	Ireland

=== 5th–8th place playoffs ===
19 July 2008

Boxscore

Netherlands	61–43	Ireland

19 July 2008

Boxscore

Romania	77–64	Israel

=== Semifinals ===
19 July 2008

Boxscore

Sweden	94–52	Hungary

19 July 2008

Boxscore

Slovakia	41–60	Poland

=== 7th place match ===
20 July 2008

Boxscore

Ireland	64–55	Israel

=== 5th place match ===
20 July 2008

Boxscore

Netherlands	46–66	Romania

=== 3rd place match ===
20 July 2008

Boxscore

Hungary	56–54	Slovakia

=== Final ===
20 July 2008

Boxscore

Sweden	64–60	Poland

== Final standings ==
Team promoted to the 2009 FIBA Europe Under-20 Championship for Women Division A

Rank	Team
1st place, gold medalist(s)	Sweden
2nd place, silver medalist(s)	Poland
3rd place, bronze medalist(s)	Hungary
4	Slovakia
5	Romania
6	Netherlands
7	Ireland
8	Israel
9	Portugal
10	Great Britain
