= Nastja Claessens =

Belgian basketball player (born 2004)

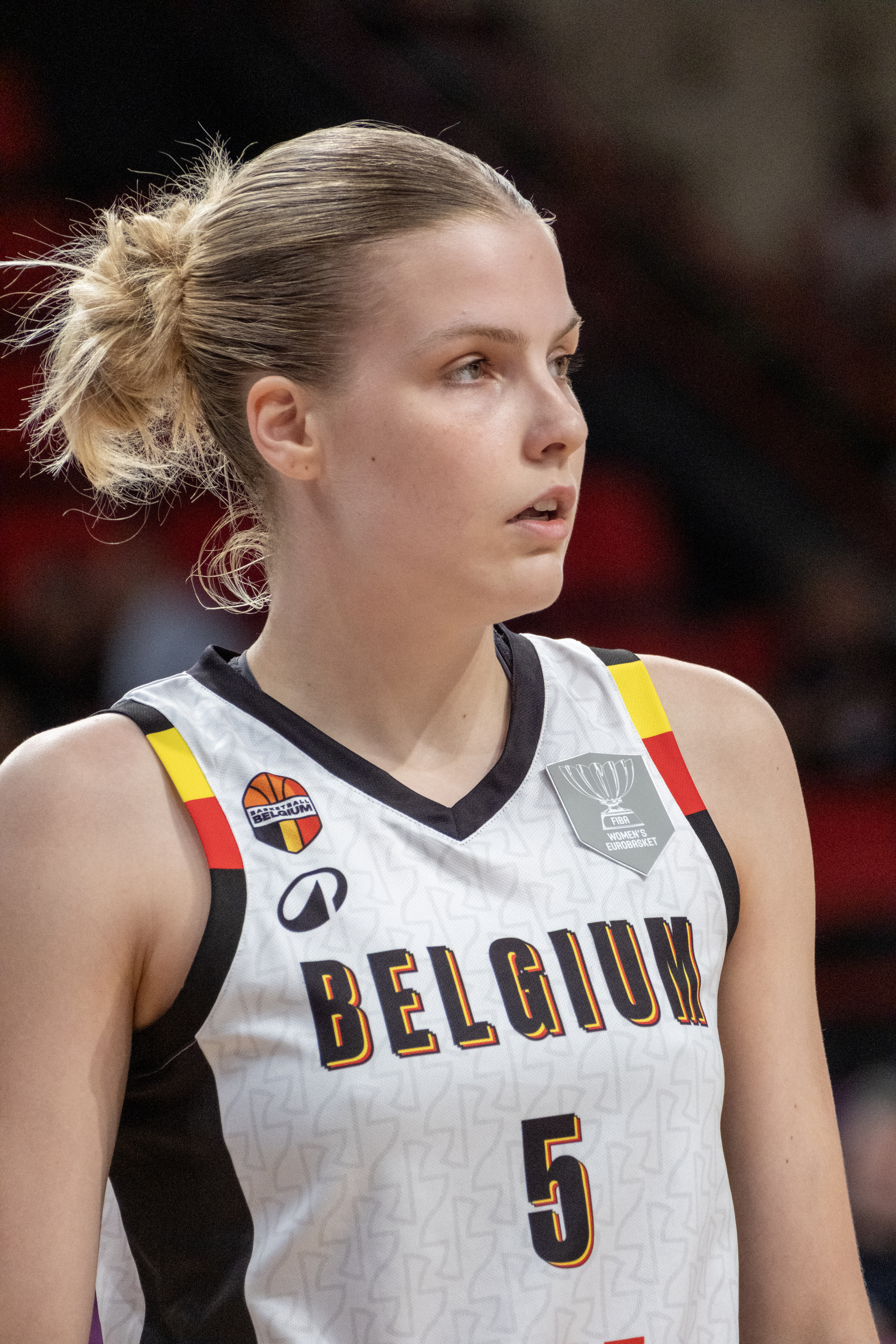
- Claessens with Belgium during 2025 EuroBasket

No. 4 – Kansas State Wildcats
- Position: Power forward
- League: Big 12 Conference

Personal information
- Born: 2 December 2004 (age 21) Waregem, Belgium
- Listed height: 6 ft 1 in (1.85 m)

Career information
- College: Kansas State Wildcats (2025–present)
- WNBA draft: 2024: 3rd round, 30th overall pick
- Drafted by: Washington Mystics
- Playing career: 2020–present

Career history
- 2020–2023: Ion Basket Waregem
- 2023–2024: Castors Braine
- 2024–2025: IDK Euskotren

Career highlights
- FIBA EuroBasket champion (2025)
- Stats at WNBA.com
- Stats at Basketball Reference

Nastja Claessens (born 2 December 2004) is a Belgian college basketball player for the Kansas State Wildcats of the Big 12 Conference. She has also played for the Belgium women's national basketball team. Before committing to Kansas State, she played professionally in Europe and was selected 30th overall by the Washington Mystics in the 2024 WNBA draft.

== Career ==
Nastja Claessens is the daughter of Belgian basketball coach Frederic Claessens and former Belgian Cat Irina Medvedeva, who comes from Turkmenistan. Nastja has both Belgian and Russian nationality. In her youth, she did ballet and played basketball. At the age of 11, she firmly chose the latter.

Claessens plays on the power forward position. At the age of 14, she made her debut in the first team with the ladies of the Belgian club Ion Basket Waregem, where she played her first season in the Belgian Women's Basketball League in the 2020/21 season at the age of 15. In May 2023, she became only the second player in Belgian women's basketball to be voted Player of the Year and Rookie of the Year in the same season. That year Claessens switched to Castors Braine, but the 2023/24 season turned out to be a disappointment due to a persistent injury to the left wrist, which she sustained in November 2023 during the preparation with the Belgian Cats for the European Championship preliminary round. She underwent surgery in the spring of 2024. She played just eight games for Braine that season.

On 15 April 2024, Claessens was selected 30th overall by the Washington Mystics in the 2024 WNBA draft. She opted to stay overseas for the 2024 season.

=== National team ===
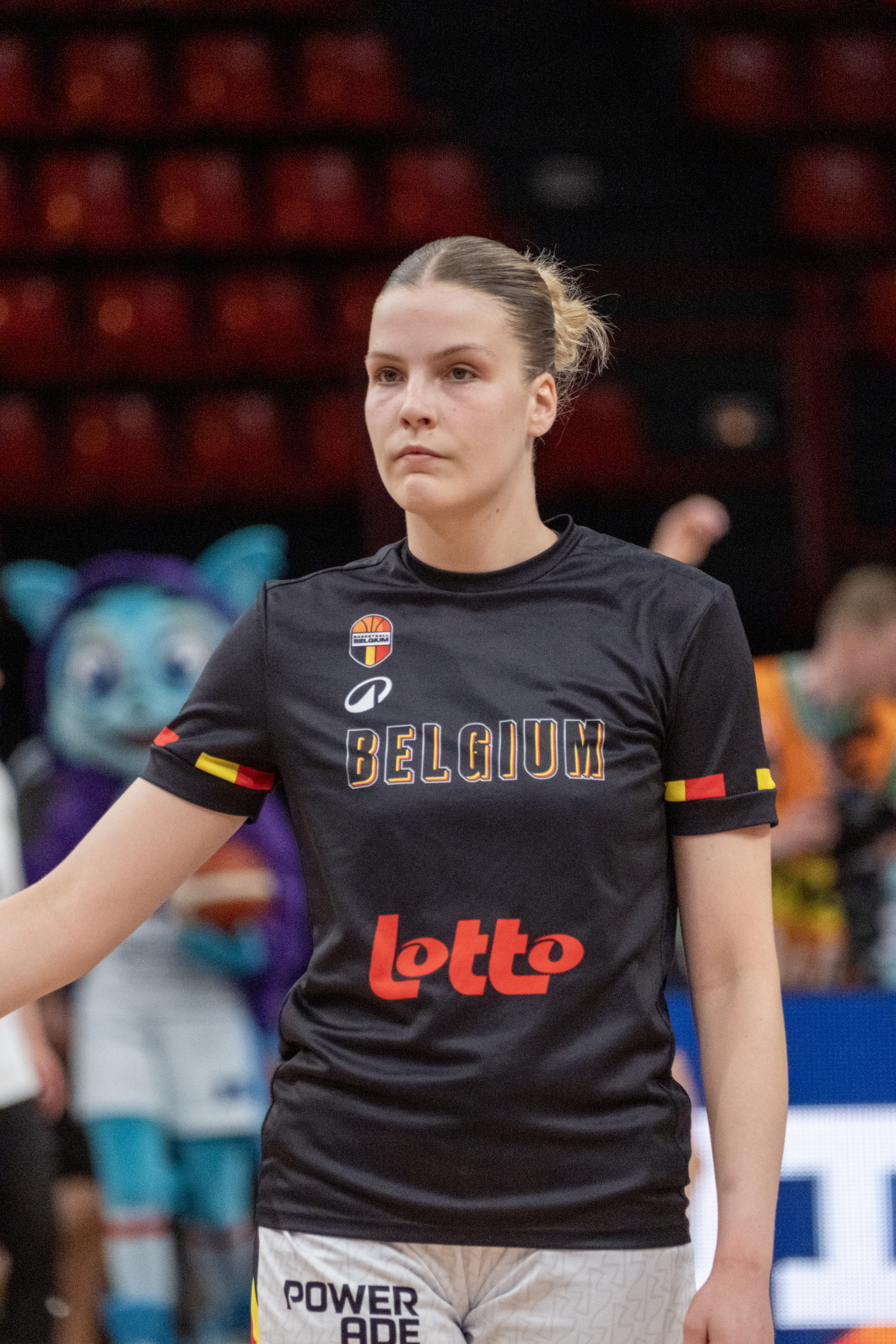
Claessens in 2025

Claessens went through various youth series for Belgium. In 2022, she was called up to the Belgian women's national basketball team for a European Championship preliminary round match. On November 22, the power forward conceded North Macedonia her debut with the first team of the Belgian Cats. In less than eight minutes of playing time, she scored three three-pointers and two free throws; and made two rebounds, two assists and a steal.

On 25 July 2024, following an injury to Julie Allemand, Claessens was promoted to the Belgian squad for the 2024 Summer Olympics.

== Honours ==
=== National team ===
- EuroBasket Women: (gold) 2025
- Belgian Sports team of the Year: 2023, 2025

=== Individual ===
- Belgian Player of the Year: 2023
- Rookie of the Year in Belgium: 2023
