= Iceland women's national under-20 basketball team =

Iceland
- FIBA zone: FIBA Europe
- National federation: Icelandic Basketball Association

U20 EuroBasket
- Appearances: 1
- Medals: None

U20 EuroBasket Division B
- Appearances: 6
- Medals: None

The Iceland women's national under-20 basketball team is a national basketball team of Iceland, administered by the Icelandic Basketball Association. It represents the country in international under-20 women's basketball competitions.

== FIBA U20 Women's EuroBasket participations ==
Year	Result in Division A	Result in Division B
2017		11th
2018		12th
2019		10th
2022		12th
2023		6th
2024		4th
2025	8th	

== See also ==
- Iceland women's national basketball team
- Iceland women's national under-18 basketball team
- Iceland men's national under-20 basketball team
