= Denmark women's national under-20 basketball team =

National basketball team of Denmark

Denmark
- FIBA zone: FIBA Europe
- National federation: Danish Basketball Association

U20 EuroBasket
- Appearances: None

U20 EuroBasket Division B
- Appearances: 2
- Medals: None

The Denmark women's national under-20 basketball team is a national basketball team of Denmark, administered by the Danish Basketball Association. It represents the country in international under-20 women's basketball competitions.

== FIBA U20 Women's EuroBasket participations ==
Year	Result in Division B
2018	11th
2025	10th

== See also ==
- Denmark women's national basketball team
- Denmark women's national under-18 basketball team
- Denmark men's national under-20 basketball team
