= Albania women's national under-20 basketball team =

National women's sports team

Albania
- FIBA zone: FIBA Europe
- National federation: Albanian Basketball Federation

U20 EuroBasket
- Appearances: None

U20 EuroBasket Division B
- Appearances: 3
- Medals: None

The Albania women's national under-20 basketball team is a national basketball team of Albania, administered by the Albanian Basketball Federation. It represents the country in international under-20 women's basketball competitions.

== FIBA U20 Women's EuroBasket participations ==
Year	Result in Division B
2022	14th
2024	15th
2025	13th

== See also ==
- Albania women's national under-18 basketball team
- Albania women's national under-16 basketball team
- Albania men's national under-20 basketball team
