= Great Britain women's national under-20 basketball team =

Great Britain
- FIBA zone: FIBA Europe
- National federation: British Basketball

U20 EuroBasket
- Appearances: 2
- Medals: None

U20 EuroBasket Division B
- Appearances: 15
- Medals: (gold) Gold: 1 (2010); (bronze) Bronze: 1 (2007)

The Great Britain women's national under-20 basketball team is a national basketball team of Great Britain, administered by the British Basketball. It represents the country in international under-20 women's basketball competitions.

== FIBA U20 Women's EuroBasket participations ==
Year	Division A	Division B
2006		4th
2007		3rd place, bronze medalist(s)
2008		10th
2009		9th
2010		1st place, gold medalist(s)
2011	8th	
2012	16th	
2013		8th
2014		7th

Year	Division A	Division B
2015		9th
2016		5th
2017		8th
2018		10th
2019		4th
2023		12th
2024		7th
2025		12th

== See also ==
- Great Britain women's national basketball team
- Great Britain women's national under-18 basketball team
- Great Britain men's national under-20 basketball team
