= Romania women's national under-20 basketball team =

Competes internationally, managed by Romanian Basketball Federation

Romania
- FIBA zone: FIBA Europe
- National federation: Romanian Basketball Federation

U20 EuroBasket
- Appearances: 4
- Medals: (bronze) Bronze: 1 (2000)

U20 EuroBasket Division B
- Appearances: 15
- Medals: (silver) Silver: 1 (2009)

The Romania women's national under-20 basketball team is a national basketball team of Romania, administered by the Romanian Basketball Federation. It represents the country in international under-20 women's basketball competitions.

== FIBA U20 Women's EuroBasket participations ==
Year	Division A	Division B
2000	3rd place, bronze medalist(s)	
2005	16th	
2007		8th
2008		5th
2009		2nd place, silver medalist(s)
2010	13th	
2011	16th	
2012		4th
2013		9th
2014		10th

Year	Division A	Division B
2015		10th
2016		8th
2017		10th
2018		4th
2019		8th
2022		10th
2023		5th
2024		13th
2025		11th

== Full 2023 roster ==
Player name	Position	Team	Date of birth
Catalina ION	SMALL FORWARD	Wright state	26 Nov 2003 (age 19)
Andreea MAZILU	SHOOTING GUARD	CSS Alexandria (ROU)	22 Jul 2002 (age 21)
Eva PETROF	SHOOTING GUARD	Academia Phoenix CSU	11 Apr 2002 (age 21)
Alexia DOBA	FORWARD	CSM Târgoviste	13 May 2004 (age 19)
Ilinca BELEGANTE	SMALL FORWARD	ACS Dan Dacian	3 Aug 2006 (age 17)
Ioana-Vanessa VELCEA	POINT GUARD	CSS Alexandria	1 Mar 2009 (age 14)
Laura BOTA	SMALL FORWARD	Universitatea Cluj	7 Sep 2003 (age 20)
Anisia CROITORU	CENTER	CSM Constanta	11 Jul 2003 (age 20)
Kriszta KOZMAN	POINT GUARD	LT Nagy Mozes	26 Oct 2004 (age 18)
Maria FARIGO	FORWARD	Universitatea Cluj	2 Aug 2003 (age 20)

== See also ==
- Romania women's national basketball team
- Romania women's national under-18 basketball team
- Romania men's national under-20 basketball team
