= Bulgaria women's national under-20 basketball team =

National basketball team of Bulgaria

Bulgaria
- FIBA zone: FIBA Europe
- National federation: Bulgarian Basketball Federation

U20 EuroBasket
- Appearances: 6
- Medals: None

U20 EuroBasket Division B
- Appearances: 12
- Medals: (gold) Gold: 1 (2019); (silver) Silver: 1 (2005)

The Bulgaria women's national under-20 basketball team is a national basketball team of Bulgaria, administered by the Bulgarian Basketball Federation. It represents the country in international under-20 women's basketball competitions.

== FIBA U20 Women's EuroBasket participations ==
Year	Division A	Division B
2005		2nd place, silver medalist(s)
2006	7th	
2007	9th	
2008	14th	
2009	10th	
2010	16th	
2011		8th
2012		9th
2013		5th

Year	Division A	Division B
2014		6th
2015		7th
2016		12th
2018		8th
2019		1st place, gold medalist(s)
2022	15th	
2023		13th
2024		10th
2025		4th

== See also ==
- Bulgaria women's national basketball team
- Bulgaria women's national under-18 basketball team
- Bulgaria men's national under-20 basketball team
