= Ukraine women's national under-20 basketball team =

Women's Basketball Team

Ukraine
- FIBA zone: FIBA Europe
- National federation: Basketball Federation of Ukraine

U20 EuroBasket
- Appearances: 12
- Medals: None

U20 EuroBasket Division B
- Appearances: 8
- Medals: None

The Ukraine women's national under-20 basketball team is a national basketball team of Ukraine, administered by the Basketball Federation of Ukraine. It represents the country in international under-20 women's basketball competitions.

== FIBA U20 Women's EuroBasket participations ==
Year	Division A	Division B
2004	5th	
2005	7th	
2006	13th	
2007	13th	
2008	5th	
2009	13th	
2010	5th	
2011	6th	
2012	7th	
2013	11th	

Year	Division A	Division B
2014	12th	
2015	16th	
2016		9th
2017		9th
2018		7th
2019		9th
2022		11th
2023		14th
2024		6th
2025		8th

== See also ==
- Ukraine women's national basketball team
- Ukraine women's national under-18 basketball team
- Ukraine men's national under-20 basketball team
