= FIBA U20 Women's EuroBasket =

International youth basketball competition

- Most recent season or competition: 2026 FIBA U20 Women's EuroBasket
- Sport: Basketball
- Founded: 2000
- Organizing body: FIBA Europe
- Divisions: 2
- No. of teams: 16 (Division A)
- Continent: Europe
- Most recent champion: France (6th title)
- Most titles: Spain (10 titles)
- Related competitions: FIBA Europe U-18; FIBA Europe U-16
- Website: www.fiba.basketball/history

The FIBA U20 Women's EuroBasket, formerly the FIBA U20 Women's European Championship, and originally the FIBA Europe Under-20 Championship for Women, is an annual youth basketball competition contested by under-20 women's national teams from FIBA Europe.

The inaugural tournament was in 2000 and was held biennially until 2004. Since 2005, the competition has been played every year.

The current champions are France, having beaten Israel in the 2026 final.

== Division A ==
=== Results ===
Year	Host	Gold medal game			Bronze medal game		
Year	Host	Gold	Score	Silver	Bronze	Score	Fourth place
2000	Slovakia (Bardejov, Lučenec, Ružomberok)	**Russia**	**84–57**	Czech Republic	Romania	58–55	Turkey
2002	Croatia (Zagreb)	**Czech Republic**	**77–74**	Russia	France	77–62	Latvia
2004	France (St Brieuc, Vannes, Quimper)	**Russia**	**80–64**	France	Czech Republic	72–52	Hungary
2005	Czech Republic (Brno)	**France**	**72–52**	Poland	Latvia	65–36	Greece
2006	Hungary (Sopron)	**Russia**	**77–68**	Hungary	France	64–55	Spain
2007	Bulgaria (Sofia)	**Spain**	**75–60**	Serbia	France	65–63	Turkey
2008	Italy (Chieti, Sulmona, Pescara)	**Russia**	**67–58**	France	Serbia	73–46	Spain
2009	Poland (Gdynia)	**France**	**74–52**	Spain	Latvia	78–75	Russia
2010	Latvia (Liepāja)	**Russia**	**75–74**	Spain	Latvia	53–49	France
2011	Serbia (Novi Sad, Zrenjanin)	**Spain**	**62–53**	Russia	Poland	67–65	Serbia
2012	Hungary (Debrecen)	**Spain**	**59–46**	Russia	Turkey	58–56	Netherlands
2013	Turkey (Samsun)	**Spain**	**59–53**	Italy	Turkey	53–38	Belarus
2014	Italy (Udine)	**France**	**47–42***	Spain	Italy	68–63	Serbia
2015	Spain (Tinajo, Teguise)	**Spain**	**66–47**	France	Netherlands	63–51	Russia
2016	Portugal (Matosinhos)	**Spain**	**71–69**	Italy	Russia	78–72	Serbia
2017	Portugal (Matosinhos)	**Spain**	**73–63**	Slovenia	Russia	80–59	France
2018	Hungary (Sopron)	**Spain**	**69–50**	Serbia	Netherlands	65–60	Italy
2019	Czech Republic (Klatovy)	**Italy**	**70–67**	Russia	France	50–34	Belgium
2020	Hungary	Cancelled due to COVID-19 pandemic in Hungary.					
2021	Hungary	Cancelled due to COVID-19 pandemic in Europe. The 2021 FIBA U20 Women's European Challengers were played instead.					
2022	Hungary (Sopron)	**Spain**	**47–42**	Czech Republic	Italy	64–48	France
2023	Lithuania (Klaipėda, Vilnius)	**France**	**85–59**	Latvia	Spain	94–36	Serbia
2024	Lithuania (Klaipėda)	**France**	**83–75**	Spain	Italy	70–48	Germany
2025	Portugal (Matosinhos)	**Spain**	**102–50**	Lithuania	Italy	84–51	Sweden
2026	Lithuania (Alytus, Klaipėda)	**France**	**79–66**	Israel	Spain	81–59	Belgium

=== Medal table ===
Rank	Nation	Gold	Silver	Bronze	Total
1	Spain	10	4	2	16
2	France	6	3	4	13
3	Russia	5	4	2	11
4	Italy	1	2	4	7
5	Czech Republic	1	2	1	4
6	Serbia	0	2	1	3
7	Latvia	0	1	3	4
8	Poland	0	1	1	2
9	Hungary	0	1	0	1
9	Israel	0	1	0	1
9	Lithuania	0	1	0	1
9	Slovenia	0	1	0	1
13	Netherlands	0	0	2	2
13	Turkey	0	0	2	2
15	Romania	0	0	1	1
Totals (15 entries)		**23**	**23**	**23**	**69**

=== Participation details ===
==== Tournaments 2000–2016 ====
Team	(Slovakia) 2000	(Croatia) 2002	(France) 2004	(Czech Republic) 2005	(Hungary) 2006	(Bulgaria) 2007	(Italy) 2008	(Poland) 2009	(Latvia) 2010	(Serbia) 2011	(Hungary) 2012	(Turkey) 2013	(Italy) 2014	(Spain) 2015	(Portugal) 2016
Belarus	–	–	–	–	–	11th	12th	14th	11th	14th	8th	4th	14th	–	–
Belgium	–	–	10th	14th	5th	5th	15th	–	–	–	–	–	13th	11th	5th
Bosnia and Herzegovina	–	–	–	–	–	–	–	–	–	–	–	–	–	–	11th
Bulgaria	–	–	–	–	7th	9th	14th	10th	16th	–	–	–	–	–	–
Croatia	6th	6th	8th	5th	–	–	–	–	–	–	–	–	–	–	–
Czech Republic	2nd	1st	3rd	10th	10th	14th	10th	15th	–	–	–	–	11th	15th	–
Finland	–	–	11th	15th	16th	–	–	–	–	–	–	–	–	–	–
France	–	3rd	2nd	1st	3rd	3rd	2nd	1st	4th	5th	5th	5th	1st	2nd	6th
Germany	10th	12th	–	9th	6th	8th	13th	8th	14th	15th	–	14th	–	13th	16th
Great Britain	–	–	–	–	–	–	–	–	–	8th	16th	–	–	–	–
Greece	–	7th	–	4th	8th	10th	16th	–	–	–	–	9th	16th	–	14th
Hungary	7th	10th	4th	12th	2nd	16th	–	–	–	–	*	15th	–	14th	–
Israel	–	–	–	–	14th	15th	–	–	–	–	–	–	–	–	–
Italy	11th	11th	12th	6th	9th	6th	9th	9th	12th	7th	13th	2nd	3rd	5th	2nd
Latvia	12th	4th	–	3rd	12th	12th	6th	3rd	3rd	12th	15th	–	5th	12th	7th
Lithuania	–	–	–	–	–	–	8th	12th	6th	11th	9th	16th	–	–	–
Montenegro	part of Serbia and Montenegro					–	11th	16th	–	–	–	–	–	–	–
Netherlands	–	–	–	–	–	–	–	–	10th	10th	4th	10th	10th	3rd	9th
Poland	9th	–	6th	2nd	15th	–	–	5th	9th	3rd	10th	12th	6th	7th	8th
Portugal	–	–	–	–	–	–	–	–	–	–	14th	–	–	6th	10th
Romania	3rd	–	–	16th	–	–	–	–	13th	16th	–	–	–	–	–
Russia	1st	2nd	1st	11th	1st	7th	1st	4th	1st	2nd	2nd	6th	7th	4th	3rd
Serbia	part of Serbia and Montenegro					2nd	3rd	7th	8th	4th	11th	8th	4th	10th	4th
Slovakia	8th	9th	7th	–	–	–	–	–	–	13th	12th	7th	8th	8th	15th
Spain	5th	5th	9th	8th	4th	1st	4th	2nd	2nd	1st	1st	1st	2nd	1st	1st
Sweden	–	–	–	–	–	–	–	11th	15th	–	6th	13th	15th	–	12th
Turkey	4th	8th	–	13th	11th	4th	7th	6th	7th	9th	3rd	3rd	9th	9th	13th
Ukraine	–	–	5th	7th	13th	13th	5th	13th	5th	6th	7th	11th	12th	16th	–
Team	(Slovakia) 2000	(Croatia) 2002	(France) 2004	(Czech Republic) 2005	(Hungary) 2006	(Bulgaria) 2007	(Italy) 2008	(Poland) 2009	(Latvia) 2010	(Serbia) 2011	(Hungary) 2012	(Turkey) 2013	(Italy) 2014	(Spain) 2015	(Portugal) 2016

==== Tournaments 2017–present ====
Team	(Portugal) 2017	(Hungary) 2018	(Czech Republic) 2019	(Hungary) 2022	(Lithuania) 2023	(Lithuania) 2024	(Portugal) 2025	(Lithuania) 2026	Total
Belarus	–	–	15th	–	–	–	–	–	9
Belgium	7th	10th	4th	13th	15th	–	5th	4th	15
Bosnia and Herzegovina	16th	–	–	–	–	–	–	–	2
Bulgaria	–	–	–	15th	–	–	–	–	6
Croatia	–	16th	–	–	–	–	–	8th	6
Czech Republic	–	–	9th	2nd	14th	–	16th	–	14
Finland	–	–	–	9th	9th	16th	–	–	6
France	4th	6th	3rd	4th	1st	1st	13th	1st	22
Germany	–	9th	16th	–	–	4th	9th	10th	17
Hungary	5th	5th	8th	5th	10th	14th	–	9th	15
Iceland	–	–	–	–	–	–	8th	12th	2
Ireland	–	–	–	16th	–	–	–	–	1
Israel	–	–	–	–	7th	9th	6th	2nd	6
Italy	6th	4th	1st	3rd	5th	3rd	3rd	13th	23
Latvia	8th	11th	10th	10th	2nd	8th	11th	11th	21
Lithuania	14th	–	11th	12th	16th	10th	2nd	6th	13
Montenegro	–	–	–	–	12th	13th	–	–	4
Netherlands	13th	3rd	13th	14th	–	–	15th	–	12
Poland	10th	12th	7th	7th	11th	6th	10th	5th	20
Portugal	12th	7th	14th	6th	6th	11th	14th	–	10
Russia	3rd	13th	2nd	DQ	–	–	–	–	18
Serbia	9th	2nd	6th	8th	4th	15th	–	14th	17
Slovakia	–	15th	–	–	–	–	–	–	10
Slovenia	2nd	14th	–	–	–	5th	12th	16th	5
Spain	1st	1st	5th	1st	3rd	2nd	1st	3rd	23
Sweden	11th	8th	12th	11th	13th	12th	4th	15th	14
Turkey	15th	–	–	–	8th	7th	7th	7th	19
Team	(Portugal) 2017	(Hungary) 2018	(Czech Republic) 2019	(Hungary) 2022	(Lithuania) 2023	(Lithuania) 2024	(Portugal) 2025	(Lithuania) 2026	Total
Great Britain	playing in lower divisions								2
Romania	playing in lower divisions								4
Ukraine	playing in lower divisions								12

=== Overall win–loss record ===
- Teams in **bold** qualified for the 2026 edition.

Team	App	Played	Won	Lost	%
**Spain**	23	181	148	33	81.8%
**France**	22	174	134	40	77%
Russia	18	147	107	40	72.8%
**Italy**	23	177	100	77	56.5%
**Latvia**	21	163	82	81	50.3%
**Turkey**	19	152	78	74	51.3%
**Poland**	20	155	75	80	48.4%
**Serbia**	17	134	69	65	51.5%
**Hungary**	15	112	56	56	50%
**Belgium**	15	111	53	58	47.7%
Czech Republic	14	106	51	55	48.1%
**Germany**	17	131	50	81	38.2%
Ukraine	12	98	47	51	48%
Netherlands	12	94	45	49	47.9%
**Sweden**	14	107	39	68	36.4%
Slovakia	10	81	37	44	45.7%
**Lithuania**	13	99	33	66	33.3%
Portugal	10	74	31	43	41.9%
Belarus	9	73	25	48	34.2%
**Israel**	6	42	18	24	42.9%
Greece	8	63	18	45	28.6%
**Croatia**	6	46	16	31	34.8%
**Slovenia**	5	35	14	21	40%
Bulgaria	6	46	14	32	30.4%
Finland	6	44	13	31	29.5%
Romania	4	34	12	22	35.3%
Montenegro	4	28	7	21	25%
**Iceland**	2	14	4	10	28.6%
Bosnia and Herzegovina	2	14	2	12	14.3%
Great Britain	2	18	2	16	11.1%
Ireland	1	7	0	7	0%

=== Top scorers (points per game) ===
Here is a list of all Top Scorers of each edition.

Year	Top Scorer	PPG
2000	(Slovakia) Zuzana Žirková	23.2
2002	(Slovakia) Daniela Číkošová	19.0
2004	(Ukraine) Olexandra Gorbunova	26.3
2005	(Ukraine) Olexandra Gorbunova	25.5
2006	(Ukraine) Olexandra Gorbunova	19.6
2007	(Ukraine) Arina Lysyuk	22.0
2008	(Montenegro) Snežana Aleksić	21.9
2009	(Latvia) Elīna Babkina	21.8
2010	(Lithuania) Marina Solopova	21.0
2011	(Ukraine) Alina Iagupova	16.6
2012	(Ukraine) Alina Iagupova	27.6
2013	(Spain) Astou Ndour	17.3
2014	(Ukraine) Miriam Uro-Nile	18.0
2015	(Belgium) Hind Ben Abdelkader	22.0
2016	(Italy) Cecilia Zandalasini	22.0
2017	(Bosnia and Herzegovina) Melisa Brčaninović	23.0
2018	(Germany) Satou Sabally	20.7
2019	(Hungary) Dalma Czukor	16.1
2022	(Poland) Magdalena Szymkiewicz	18.4
2023	(Latvia) Vanesa Jasa	19.0
2024	(Germany) Frieda Bühner	18.6
2025	(Latvia) Raina Tomasicka	24.4
2026	(Israel) Gal Raviv	28.1

== Division B ==
=== Results ===
Year	Host	Promoted to Division A			Bronze medal game		
Year	Host	Gold	Score	Silver	Bronze *	Score	Fourth place
2005	Lithuania (Druskininkai)	Israel	Round-robin group	Bulgaria	Lithuania	Round-robin group	Slovenia
2006	Lithuania (Druskininkai)	Belarus	66–58	Serbia and Montenegro	Slovakia	84–52	Great Britain
2007	Lithuania (Druskininkai)	Montenegro	83–64	Lithuania	Great Britain	79–73	Portugal
2008	Poland (Poznań)	Sweden	64–60	Poland	Hungary	56–54	Slovakia
2009	Macedonia (Ohrid)	Netherlands	59–53	Romania	Belgium	94–81	Slovakia
2010	Macedonia (Kavadarci)	Great Britain	47–46	Slovakia	Czech Republic	61–47	Portugal
2011	Macedonia (Ohrid)	Sweden	64–55	Portugal	Greece	60–59	Czech Republic
2012	Czech Republic (Klatovy)	Greece	Round-robin group	Germany	Hungary	Round-robin group	Romania
2013	Bulgaria (Albena)	Belgium	Round-robin group	Czech Republic	Latvia	Round-robin group	Portugal
2014	Bulgaria (Sofia)	Germany	Round-robin group	Hungary	Portugal	Round-robin group	Lithuania
2015	Montenegro (Podgorica)	Bosnia and Herzegovina	Round-robin group	Greece	Sweden	Round-robin group	Montenegro
2016	Montenegro (Podgorica)	Slovenia	62–45	Lithuania	Hungary	50–49	Czech Republic
2017	Israel (Eilat)	Germany	60–54	Slovakia	Croatia	60–51	Belarus
2018	Romania (Oradea)	Czech Republic	68–47	Belarus	Lithuania	53–48	Romania
2019	Kosovo (Pristina)	Bulgaria	80–75	Finland	Ireland	60–57	Great Britain
2020	Israel	Cancelled due to COVID-19 pandemic in Israel					
2021	North Macedonia	Cancelled due to COVID-19 pandemic in Europe. The 2021 FIBA U20 Women's European Challengers were played instead.					
2022	North Macedonia (Skopje)	Montenegro	98–56	Turkey	Israel	82–64	Slovenia
2023	Romania (Craiova)	Slovenia	57–47	Germany	Netherlands	68–51	Switzerland
2024	Bulgaria (Sofia)	Netherlands	80–65	Belgium	Czech Republic	77–52	Iceland
2025	Hungary (Miskolc)	Hungary	71–44	Serbia	Croatia	82–78	Bulgaria
2026	Bulgaria (Samokov)	Portugal	78–43	Greece	Montenegro	70–55	Slovakia

* Since 2012, the 3rd team in Division B is also promoted to Division A for the next tournament.

=== Medal table ===
Rank	Nation	Gold	Silver	Bronze	Total
1	Germany	2	2	0	4
2	Montenegro	2	0	1	3
2	Netherlands	2	0	1	3
2	Sweden	2	0	1	3
5	Slovenia	2	0	0	2
6	Greece	1	2	1	4
7	Hungary	1	1	3	5
8	Czech Republic	1	1	2	4
9	Belgium	1	1	1	3
9	Portugal	1	1	1	3
11	Belarus	1	1	0	2
11	Bulgaria	1	1	0	2
13	Great Britain	1	0	1	2
13	Israel	1	0	1	2
15	Bosnia and Herzegovina	1	0	0	1
16	Lithuania	0	2	2	4
17	Slovakia	0	2	1	3
18	Finland	0	1	0	1
18	Poland	0	1	0	1
18	Romania	0	1	0	1
18	Serbia	0	1	0	1
18	Serbia and Montenegro	0	1	0	1
18	Turkey	0	1	0	1
24	Croatia	0	0	2	2
25	Ireland	0	0	1	1
25	Latvia	0	0	1	1
Totals (26 entries)		20	20	20	60

=== Participation details ===
Team	(Lithuania) 2005	(Lithuania) 2006	(Lithuania) 2007	(Poland) 2008	(North Macedonia) 2009	(North Macedonia) 2010	(North Macedonia) 2011	(Czech Republic) 2012	(Bulgaria) 2013	(Bulgaria) 2014	(Montenegro) 2015	(Montenegro) 2016	(Israel) 2017	(Romania) 2018	(Kosovo) 2019	(North Macedonia) 2022	(Romania) 2023	(Bulgaria) 2024	(Hungary) 2025	(Bulgaria) 2026	Total
Albania	–	–	–	–	–	–	–	–	–	–	–	–	–	–	–	14th	–	15th	13th	14th	4
Armenia	–	–	–	–	–	–	–	–	–	–	–	–	–	–	–	16th	–	–	–	–	1
Austria	–	–	–	–	10th	10th	9th	–	–	–	6th	–	–	–	–	–	15th	14th	–	–	6
Azerbaijan	–	–	–	–	–	–	–	–	–	–	–	–	–	–	–	–	–	–	–	11th	1
Belarus	–	1st	–	–	–	–	–	–	–	–	–	11th	4th	2nd	–	–	–	–	–	–	4
Belgium	–	–	–	–	3rd	7th	7th	7th	1st	–	–	–	–	–	–	–	–	2nd	–	–	6
Bosnia and Herzegovina	–	–	–	–	–	–	–	–	–	5th	1st	–	–	–	–	–	–	–	–	13th	3
Bulgaria	2nd	–	–	–	–	–	8th	9th	5th	6th	7th	12th	–	8th	1st	–	13th	10th	4th	6th	13
Croatia	–	–	–	–	–	–	–	–	–	–	–	7th	3rd	–	6th	17th	9th	8th	3rd	–	7
Czech Republic	–	–	–	–	–	3rd	4th	5th	2nd	–	–	4th	6th	1st	–	–	–	3rd	–	7th	9
Denmark	–	–	–	–	–	–	–	–	–	–	–	–	–	11th	–	–	–	–	10th	–	2
Estonia	–	–	–	–	–	–	10th	–	–	–	–	–	–	–	–	–	–	–	–	–	1
Finland	–	–	–	–	–	–	–	–	–	–	–	–	–	–	2nd	–	–	–	–	–	1
Georgia	–	–	–	–	–	–	–	–	–	–	–	–	–	–	–	18th	16th	–	–	–	2
Germany	–	–	–	–	–	–	–	2nd	–	1st	–	–	1st	–	–	6th	2nd	–	–	–	5
Great Britain	–	4th	3rd	10th	9th	1st	–	–	8th	7th	9th	5th	8th	10th	4th	–	12th	7th	12th	–	15
Greece	–	–	–	–	5th	8th	3rd	1st	–	–	2nd	–	5th	9th	11th	5th	10th	9th	6th	2nd	13
Hungary	–	–	–	3rd	7th	5th	6th	3rd	–	2nd	–	3rd	–	–	–	–	–	–	1st	–	8
Iceland	–	–	–	–	–	–	–	–	–	–	–	–	11th	12th	10th	12th	6th	4th	–	–	6
Ireland	6th	11th	10th	7th	–	–	–	–	–	–	–	13th	12th	–	3rd	–	8th	5th	7th	8th	11
Israel	1st	–	–	8th	8th	6th	5th	6th	6th	8th	8th	10th	7th	6th	5th	3rd	–	–	–	–	14
Kosovo	–	–	–	–	–	–	–	–	–	–	–	–	–	–	12th	15th	17th	–	–	–	3
Latvia	–	–	–	–	–	–	–	–	3rd	–	–	–	–	–	–	–	–	–	–	–	1
Lithuania	3rd	7th	2nd	–	–	–	–	–	–	4th	5th	2nd	–	3rd	–	–	–	–	–	–	7
Malta	–	–	–	–	–	–	–	–	–	–	–	–	–	–	–	–	–	–	14th	–	1
Montenegro	(Serbia and Montenegro) SCG		1st	–	–	–	–	–	–	–	4th	6th	–	–	–	1st	–	–	–	3rd	5
Netherlands	–	8th	7th	6th	1st	–	–	–	–	–	–	–	–	–	–	–	3rd	1st	–	5th	7
North Macedonia	–	–	–	–	11th	9th	11th	–	7th	–	–	–	–	–	–	8th	–	–	–	–	5
Norway	–	–	–	–	–	–	–	–	–	9th	–	–	–	–	–	7th	7th	–	–	–	3
Poland	–	–	6th	2nd	–	–	–	–	–	–	–	–	–	–	–	–	–	–	–	–	2
Portugal	7th	6th	4th	9th	6th	4th	2nd	–	4th	–	–	–	–	–	–	–	–	–	–	1st	9
Romania	–	–	–	5th	2nd	–	–	4th	9th	10th	10th	8th	10th	4th	8th	10th	5th	13th	11th	12th	15
Serbia	(Serbia and Montenegro) SCG		–	–	–	–	–	–	–	–	–	–	–	–	–	–	–	–	2nd	–	1
Slovakia	–	3rd	–	4th	4th	2nd	–	–	–	–	–	–	2nd	–	–	13th	11th	12th	5th	4th	10
Slovenia	4th	5th	–	–	–	–	–	–	–	–	–	1st	–	–	–	4th	1st	–	–	–	5
Sweden	5th	9th	5th	1st	–	–	1st	–	–	–	3rd	–	–	–	–	–	–	–	–	–	6
Switzerland	–	10th	9th	–	–	–	–	8th	–	–	–	–	–	–	–	9th	4th	11th	9th	10th	8
Turkey	–	–	–	–	–	–	–	–	–	–	–	–	–	5th	7th	2nd	–	–	–	–	3
Ukraine	–	–	–	–	–	–	–	–	–	–	–	9th	9th	7th	9th	11th	14th	6th	8th	9th	9
Team	(Lithuania) 2005	(Lithuania) 2006	(Lithuania) 2007	(Poland) 2008	(North Macedonia) 2009	(North Macedonia) 2010	(North Macedonia) 2011	(Czech Republic) 2012	(Bulgaria) 2013	(Bulgaria) 2014	(Montenegro) 2015	(Montenegro) 2016	(Israel) 2017	(Romania) 2018	(Kosovo) 2019	(North Macedonia) 2022	(Romania) 2023	(Bulgaria) 2024	(Hungary) 2025	(Bulgaria) 2026	Total
Serbia and Montenegro †	–	2nd	defunct																		1

== See also ==
- EuroBasket Women
- FIBA U18 Women's EuroBasket
- FIBA U16 Women's EuroBasket
