= Ireland women's national under-20 basketball team =

Ireland
- FIBA zone: FIBA Europe
- National federation: Basketball Ireland

U20 EuroBasket
- Appearances: 1
- Medals: None

U20 EuroBasket Division B
- Appearances: 10
- Medals: (bronze) Bronze: 1 (2019)

The Ireland women's national under-20 basketball team is a national basketball team of Ireland, administered by the Basketball Ireland. It represents the country in international under-20 women's basketball competitions.

== FIBA U20 Women's EuroBasket participations ==
Year	Division A	Division B
2005		6th
2006		11th
2007		10th
2008		7th
2016		13th
2017		12th

Year	Division A	Division B
2019		3rd place, bronze medalist(s)
2022	16th	
2023		8th
2024		5th
2025		7th

== See also ==
- Ireland women's national basketball team
- Ireland women's national under-18 basketball team
- Ireland men's national under-20 basketball team
