= 2015 FIBA Europe Under-20 Championship for Women =

2015 FIBA U20 Women's European Championship
14th FIBA Under-20 Women's European Basketball Championship

Tournament details
- Host country: Spain
- Dates: 2–12 July 2015
- Teams: 16
- Venues: 2 (in 2 host cities)

Final positions
- Champions: Spain (5th title)

Official website
- archive.fiba.com

The 2015 FIBA Europe Under-20 Championship for Women was the 14th edition of the FIBA Europe Under-20 Championship for Women. 16 teams participated in the competition, played in Tinajo and Teguise, Spain, from 2 to 12 July 2015.

== Participating teams ==
- Belgium
- Czech Republic
- France
- Germany ▲ (Winners, 2014 FIBA Europe Under-20 Championship for Women Division B)
- Hungary ▲ (Runners-up, 2014 FIBA Europe Under-20 Championship for Women Division B)
- Italy
- Latvia
- Netherlands
- Poland
- Portugal ▲ (3rd place, 2014 FIBA Europe Under-20 Championship for Women Division B)
- Russia
- Serbia
- Slovakia
- Spain
- Turkey
- Ukraine

== First round ==
The first-round groups draw took place on 30 November 2014 in Budapest, Hungary. In the first round, the sixteen teams are allocated in four groups of four teams each. The top three teams of each group will qualify to the Second Round. The last team of each group will play in the Classification Group G first, then in the 9th–16th place playoffs.

All times are local – Western European Summer Time (UTC+1).

=== Group A ===
Pos	Team	Pld	W	L	PF	PA	PD	Pts	Qualification
1	Russia	3	3	0	183	156	+27	6	Advance to second round
2	Poland	3	2	1	173	155	+18	5	Advance to second round
3	Germany	3	1	2	169	176	−7	4	Advance to second round
4	Serbia	3	0	3	154	192	−38	3	Classification Group G

Source: u20women.fibaeurope.com

2 July 2015
14:00

Boxscore

Serbia	57–72	Russia
Scoring by quarter: 18–19, 15–20, 11–17, 13–16
Pts: Crvendakic 17; Rebs: Rodic 9 Asts: Mandic 3		Pts: Komarova 13; Rebs: Sazonova 8 Asts: Komarova 5

Ayuntamento de Tinajo, Tinajo – Las Palmas (ESP)
Attendance: 100
Referees: Ingus Baumanis (LAT), Anna Cardus (ESP), Vincent Delestrée (BEL)

2 July 2015
16:15

Boxscore

Poland	68–55	Germany
Scoring by quarter: 19–13, 20–12, 7–18, 22–12
Pts: Stankiewicz 19; Rebs: 3 players 5 Asts: Drop 3		Pts: Degbeon 19; Rebs: Rouault 11; Asts: Stach 4

Ayuntamento de Tinajo, Tinajo – Las Palmas (ESP)
Attendance: 200
Referees: Anastasios Manos (GRE), Mathieu Hosselet (FRA), Mykola Ambrosov (UKR)

3 July 2015
14:00

Boxscore

Germany	65–51	Serbia
Scoring by quarter: 13–17, 17–11, 15–8, 20–15
Pts: Rouault 19; Rebs: Degbeon 13; Asts: Stach 6		Pts: Crvendakic 20; Rebs: Crvendakic 12; Asts: Corda, Mandic 3

Pabellon Municipal de Teguise, Teguise – Las Palmas (ESP)
Attendance: 125
Referees: Robert Paulik (CZE), Carlos Santos (POR), Francisco Araña (ESP)

3 July 2015
20:45

Boxscore

Russia	54–50	Poland
Scoring by quarter: 18–7, 6–12, 13–16, 17–15
Pts: Kuzmina 15; Rebs: Shchukina 9 Asts: Fedorova 4		Pts: Stankiewicz 13; Rebs: Szatjauer 7 Asts: Stankiewicz, Naczk 3

Pabellon Municipal de Teguise, Teguise – Las Palmas (ESP)
Attendance: 125
Referees: Milan Brziak (SVK), Vladan Šundić (MNE), Alessandro Martolini (ITA)

4 July 2015
16:15

Boxscore

Serbia	46–55	Poland
Scoring by quarter: 13–10, 11–8, 9–21, 13–16
Pts: Stankovic 17; Rebs: Stankovic 9 Asts: Mandic 4		Pts: Stankiewicz 16; Rebs: Szatjauer 10; Asts: Naczk 6

Ayuntamento de Tinajo, Tinajo – Las Palmas (ESP)
Attendance: 100
Referees: Bert Van Slooten (NED), Anastasios Manos (GRE), Mathieu Hosselet (FRA)

4 July 2015
18:30

Boxscore

Germany	49–57	Russia
Scoring by quarter: 22–25, 7–9, 7–12, 13–11
Pts: Hartmann 17; Rebs: Hartmann 11; Asts: Körner 4		Pts: Fedorova 11; Rebs: Kuzmina 10; Asts: 3 players 3

Ayuntamento de Tinajo, Tinajo – Las Palmas (ESP)
Attendance: 100
Referees: Vincent Delestrée (BEL), Alakbar Hasanov (AZE), Anna Cardus (ESP)

=== Group B ===
Pos	Team	Pld	W	L	PF	PA	PD	Pts	Qualification
1	France	3	3	0	173	123	+50	6	Advance to second round
2	Slovakia	3	2	1	160	166	−6	5	Advance to second round
3	Latvia	3	1	2	172	193	−21	4	Advance to second round
4	Turkey	3	0	3	160	183	−23	3	Classification Group G

Source: u20women.fibaeurope.com

2 July 2015
18:30

Boxscore

France	51–35	Turkey
Scoring by quarter: 5–13, 15–4, 19–9, 12–9
Pts: Johannès 17; Rebs: 3 players 5 Asts: Millavet 2		Pts: Gülcan 12; Rebs: Çoklar 6 Asts: 4 players 1

Ayuntamento de Tinajo, Tinajo – Las Palmas (ESP)
Attendance: 200
Referees: Milivoje Jovčić (SRB), Charalampos Karakatsounis (GRE), Robert Paulik (CZE)

2 July 2015
20:45

Boxscore

Slovakia	64–48	Latvia
Scoring by quarter: 17–10, 25–9, 14–15, 8–14
Pts: Dudášová 22; Rebs: 3 players 5 Asts: Páleníková, Dudášová 2		Pts: D.Strautmane 15; Rebs: P.Strautmane 9 Asts: Kudule 4

Ayuntamento de Tinajo, Tinajo – Las Palmas (ESP)
Attendance: 100
Referees: Francisco Araña (ESP), Alakbar Hasanov (AZE), Bert Van Slooten (NED)

3 July 2015
16:15

Boxscore

Turkey	57–60	Slovakia
Scoring by quarter: 19–16, 10–15, 18–19, 10–10
Pts: Senyürek 12; Rebs: Çoklar 11; Asts: Akbaş 7		Pts: Páleníková 14; Rebs: Remenárová, Hadačová 10; Asts: Dudášová 2

Pabellon Municipal de Teguise, Teguise – Las Palmas (ESP)
Attendance: 150
Referees: Mykola Ambrosov (UKR), Vincent Delestrée (BEL), Anastasios Manos (GRE)

3 July 2015
18:30

Boxscore

Latvia	52–61	France
Scoring by quarter: 9–24, 20–12, 14–10, 9–15
Pts: P.Strautmane 16; Rebs: P.Strautmane 7 Asts: D.Strautmane 3		Pts: Gaye 21; Rebs: Millavet, Mané 7 Asts: Johannès 4

Pabellon Municipal de Teguise, Teguise – Las Palmas (ESP)
Attendance: 100
Referees: Sergey Krug (RUS), Grzegorz Ziemblicki (POL), Anna Cardus (ESP)

4 July 2015
14:00

Boxscore

Latvia	72–68	Turkey
Scoring by quarter: 21–17, 20–8, 15–23, 16–20
Pts: P.Strautmane 22; Rebs: P.Strautmane 9 Asts: Kudule 6		Pts: Gülcan 26; Rebs: Senyürek 8 Asts: Akbaş 3

Ayuntamento de Tinajo, Tinajo – Las Palmas (ESP)
Attendance: 125
Referees: Vladan Šundić (MNE), Nadege Anaize Zouzou (CIV), Tamas Földhazi (HUN)

4 July 2015
20:45

Boxscore

France	61–36	Slovakia
Scoring by quarter: 13–6, 13–15, 19–4, 16–11
Pts: Djaldi-Tabdi 10; Rebs: Djaldi-Tabdi, Naigre 7 Asts: Devillers 5		Pts: Remenárová 11; Rebs: Remenárová 5 Asts: Páleníková 3

Ayuntamento de Tinajo, Tinajo – Las Palmas (ESP)
Attendance: 100
Referees: Milivoje Jovčić (SRB), Francisco Araña (ESP), Charalampos Karakatsounis (GRE)

=== Group C ===
Pos	Team	Pld	W	L	PF	PA	PD	Pts	Qualification
1	Spain	3	3	0	220	142	+78	6	Advance to second round
2	Italy	3	2	1	193	159	+34	5	Advance to second round
3	Hungary	3	1	2	175	219	−44	4	Advance to second round
4	Czech Republic	3	0	3	149	217	−68	3	Classification Group G

Source: u20women.fibaeurope.com

2 July 2015
18:30

Boxscore

Spain	54–43	Italy
Scoring by quarter: 12–6, 16–9, 11–9, 15–19
Pts: Lo 13; Rebs: Lo, Romero 7 Asts: Romero 2		Pts: Zandalasini 14; Rebs: 5 players 3 Asts: none

Pabellon Municipal de Teguise, Teguise – Las Palmas (ESP)
Attendance: 1000
Referees: Grzegorz Ziemblicki (POL), Özlem Yalman (TUR), Carlos Santos (POR)

2 July 2015
20:45

Boxscore

Czech Republic	59–61	Hungary
Scoring by quarter: 12–11, 20–12, 10–23, 17–15
Pts: Mainclová 11; Rebs: Opočenská 8 Asts: Kopecká 1		Pts: Aldazabal Berroa 14; Rebs: Kaposi 7 Asts: none

Pabellon Municipal de Teguise, Teguise – Las Palmas (ESP)
Attendance: 700
Referees: Vladan Šundić (MNE), Tomislav Hordov (CRO), Nadege Anaize Zouzou (CIV)

3 July 2015
16:15

Boxscore

Italy	79–39	Czech Republic
Scoring by quarter: 10–13, 17–13, 31–6, 21–7
Pts: Zandalasini 18; Rebs: Penna 10; Asts: Penna 5		Pts: Kopecká 9 Rebs: Mainclová 9 Asts: 3 players 2

Ayuntamento de Tinajo, Tinajo – Las Palmas (ESP)
Attendance: 100
Referees: Bert Van Slooten (NED), Milivoje Jovčić (SRB), Dariusz Lenczowski (POL)

3 July 2015
18:30

Boxscore

Hungary	48–89	Spain
Scoring by quarter: 15–25, 11–16, 7–30, 15–18
Pts: Papp 9 Rebs: Dobos 5 Asts: Böröndy 3		Pts: Quevedo 20; Rebs: Sole 11; Asts: Romero, Arrojo 3

Pabellon Municipal de Teguise, Teguise – Las Palmas (ESP)
Attendance: 400
Referees: Charalampos Karakatsounis (GRE), Ilias Kounelles (CYP), Nadege Anaize Zouzou (CIV)

4 July 2015
14:00

Boxscore

Hungary	66–71	Italy
Scoring by quarter: 18–18, 15–17, 17–21, 16–15
Pts: Nagy 17; Rebs: Böröndy 9 Asts: 3 players 3		Pts: Tagliamento 13; Rebs: Penna 13; Asts: Peresson 5

Ayuntamento de Tinajo, Tinajo – Las Palmas (ESP)
Attendance: 100
Referees: Ingus Baumanis (LAT), Mykola Ambrosov (UKR), Sergey Krug (RUS)

4 July 2015
18:30

Boxscore

Spain	77–51	Czech Republic
Scoring by quarter: 15–19, 18–11, 23–6, 21–15
Pts: Orts 18; Rebs: Sole 7 Asts: Romero, Canella Rodriguez 3		Pts: Mainclová, Opočenská 8 Rebs: Křivánková 6 Asts: Beránková 3

Pabellon Municipal de Teguise, Teguise – Las Palmas (ESP)
Attendance: 400
Referees: Özlem Yalman (TUR), Carlos Santos (POR), Tomislav Hordov (CRO)

=== Group D ===
Pos	Team	Pld	W	L	PF	PA	PD	Pts	Qualification
1	Portugal	3	2	1	186	148	+38	5 (Note: Portugal 3pts/117:110 (+7) :: Netherlands-Portugal 62–56, Portugal-Belgium 61–48)	Advance to second round
2	Netherlands	3	2	1	215	182	+33	5 (Note: Netherlands 3pts/127:124 (+3) :: Netherlands-Portugal 62–56, Netherlands-Belgium 65–68)	Advance to second round
3	Belgium	3	2	1	182	164	+18	5 (Note: Belgium 3pts/116:126 (-10) :: Portugal-Belgium 61–48, Netherlands-Belgium 65–68)	Advance to second round
4	Ukraine	3	0	3	134	223	−89	3	Classification Group G

Source: u20women.fibaeurope.com
Notes:

2 July 2015
14:00

Boxscore

Netherlands	62–56	Portugal
Scoring by quarter: 17–11, 14–11, 12–13, 19–21
Pts: Cornelius 12; Rebs: Hof 12; Asts: Slim, Hof 3		Pts: Filipe 15; Rebs: Kostourkova, Filipe 6 Asts: L.Ferreira 6

Pabellon Municipal de Teguise, Teguise – Las Palmas (ESP)
Attendance: –
Referees: Ilias Kounelles (CYP), Milan Brziak (SVK), Tamas Földhazi (HUN)

2 July 2015
16:15

Boxscore

Belgium	66–38	Ukraine
Scoring by quarter: 18–8, 19–11, 15–8, 14–11
Pts: Ben Abdelkader 13; Rebs: Ben Abdelkader 7 Asts: Ben Abdelkader 1		Pts: Stepaniuk 12; Rebs: Antoniuk 12; Asts: none

Pabellon Municipal de Teguise, Teguise – Las Palmas (ESP)
Attendance: 300
Referees: Alessandro Martolini (ITA), Dariusz Lenczowski (POL), Sergey Krug (RUS)

3 July 2015
14:00

Boxscore

Ukraine	58–88	Netherlands
Scoring by quarter: 10–16, 16–23, 17–24, 15–25
Pts: Yatskovets 16; Rebs: Antoniuk 12; Asts: Gorobets 3		Pts: van Veen 19; Rebs: Slim 12; Asts: Ndiba 4

Ayuntamento de Tinajo, Tinajo – Las Palmas (ESP)
Attendance: 100
Referees: Tomislav Hordov (CRO), Alakbar Hasanov (AZE), Özlem Yalman (TUR)

3 July 2015
20:45

Boxscore

Portugal	61–48	Belgium
Scoring by quarter: 23–17, 7–12, 13–11, 18–8
Pts: E.Ferreira 15; Rebs: L.Ferreira 12; Asts: L.Ferreira 4		Pts: Ben Abdelkader 30; Rebs: H.Nauwelaers 8 Asts: Devliegher 2

Ayuntamento de Tinajo, Tinajo – Las Palmas (ESP)
Attendance: 100
Referees: Mathieu Hosselet (FRA), Tamas Földhazi (HUN), Ingus Baumanis (LAT)

4 July 2015
16:15

Boxscore

Netherlands	65–68	Belgium
Scoring by quarter: 15–20, 19–14, 19–12, 12–22
Pts: Cornelius 20; Rebs: Hof 9 Asts: van Veen 3		Pts: Ben Abdelkader 26; Rebs: Bernard 9 Asts: De Baets 4

Pabellon Municipal de Teguise, Teguise – Las Palmas (ESP)
Attendance: 125
Referees: Alessandro Martolini (ITA), Milan Brziak (SVK), Ilias Kounelles (CYP)

4 July 2015
20:45

Boxscore

Ukraine	38–69	Portugal
Scoring by quarter: 4–20, 11–15, 12–15, 11–19
Pts: Gorobets 15; Rebs: Antoniuk 14; Asts: 3 players 2		Pts: L.Ferreira 21; Rebs: Soeiro, Kostourkova 8 Asts: L.Ferreira, Soeiro 4

Ayuntamento de Tinajo, Tinajo – Las Palmas (ESP)
Attendance: 100
Referees: Grzegorz Ziemblicki (POL), Dariusz Lenczowski (POL), Robert Paulik (CZE)

== Second round ==
Twelve advancing teams from the First Round will be allocated in two groups of six teams each. The top four teams of each group will advance to the quarterfinals. The last two teams of each group will play for the 9th – 16th places against the teams from the Group G.

Team advances to the Quarterfinals
Team will compete in the 9th – 16th place playoffs

=== Group E ===
Team	Pld	W	L	PF	PA	PD	Pts
France	5	5	0	328	214	+114	10
Russia	5	3	2	268	280	−12	8
Slovakia	5	3	2	271	269	+2	8
Poland	5	2	3	279	280	−1	7
Latvia	5	2	3	262	294	−32	7
Germany	5	0	5	241	312	−71	5

6 July 2015
14:00

Boxscore

Latvia	49–46	Russia
Scoring by quarter: 13–8, 4–16, 15–19, 17–3
Pts: P.Strautmane 18; Rebs: Birina 8 Asts: D.Strautmane 6		Pts: Kuzmina 15; Rebs: Kuzmina 7 Asts: Chaykovskaya, Shchetina 2

Pabellon Municipal de Teguise, Teguise – Las Palmas (ESP)
Attendance: 100
Referees: Milivoje Jovčić (SRB), Tomislav Hordov (CRO), Anastasios Manos (GRE)

6 July 2015
16:15

Boxscore

Germany	35–65	France
Scoring by quarter: 7–20, 2–17, 14–19, 12–9
Pts: Degbeon 8 Rebs: Degbeon, Hartmann 7 Asts: Körner, Aha 2		Pts: Gaye 16; Rebs: Gaye 9 Asts: Johannès, Hero 2

Pabellon Municipal de Teguise, Teguise – Las Palmas (ESP)
Attendance: 125
Referees: Alessandro Martolini (ITA), Robert Paulik (CZE), Carlos Santos (POR)

6 July 2015
18:30

Boxscore

Slovakia	51–46	Poland
Scoring by quarter: 9–10, 15–12, 10–10, 17–14
Pts: Dudášová 19; Rebs: Páleníková 8 Asts: Dudášová 4		Pts: Stankiewicz 16; Rebs: Szatjauer 9 Asts: Stankiewicz, Naczk 3

Ayuntamento de Tinajo, Tinajo – Las Palmas (ESP)
Attendance: 100
Referees: Francisco Araña (ESP), Anna Cardus (ESP), Vincent Delestrée (BEL)

7 July 2015
14:00

Boxscore

Russia	67–60	Slovakia
Scoring by quarter: 16–14, 15–10, 20–12, 16–24
Pts: Komarova 16; Rebs: Shchetina 9 Asts: Sazonova, Shchukina 5		Pts: Stašová 27; Rebs: Páleníková 7 Asts: Remenárová 3

Pabellon Municipal de Teguise, Teguise – Las Palmas (ESP)
Attendance: 100
Referees: Charalampos Karakatsounis (GRE), Mykola Ambrosov (UKR), Bert Van Slooten (NED)

7 July 2015
20:45

Boxscore

Latvia	62–55	Germany
Scoring by quarter: 14–11, 16–10, 10–14, 22–20
Pts: D.Strautmane 21; Rebs: D.Strautmane 12; Asts: Kudule 5		Pts: Hartmann 15; Rebs: Degbeon 12; Asts: Körner 6

Ayuntamento de Tinajo, Tinajo – Las Palmas (ESP)
Attendance: 100
Referees: Francisco Araña (ESP), Vincent Delestrée (BEL), Tamas Földhazi (HUN)

7 July 2015
20:45

Boxscore

Poland	47–69	France
Scoring by quarter: 18–26, 5–12, 13–18, 11–13
Pts: Pobozy 10; Rebs: Drop 5 Asts: Naczk 4		Pts: Millavet 15; Rebs: Guapo 7 Asts: Johannès 4

Pabellon Municipal de Teguise, Teguise – Las Palmas (ESP)
Attendance: 100
Referees: Milivoje Jovčić (SRB), Vladan Šundić (MNE), Özlem Yalman (TUR)

8 July 2015
18:30

Boxscore

Poland	68–51	Latvia
Scoring by quarter: 21–14, 11–11, 11–13, 25–13
Pts: Stankiewicz 30; Rebs: Rembiszewska 7 Asts: Stankiewicz 3		Pts: P.Strautmane 13; Rebs: P.Strautmane 10; Asts: P.Strautmane, D.Strautmane 2

Ayuntamento de Tinajo, Tinajo – Las Palmas (ESP)
Attendance: 100
Referees: Alessandro Martolini (ITA), Mykola Ambrosov (UKR), Bert Van Slooten (NED)

8 July 2015
20:45

Boxscore

Slovakia	60–47	Germany
Scoring by quarter: 15–15, 8–11, 20–11, 17–10
Pts: Remenárová 16; Rebs: Remenárová 9 Asts: Páleníková 3		Pts: Degbeon 18; Rebs: Degbeon 8 Asts: Stach 4

Ayuntamento de Tinajo, Tinajo – Las Palmas (ESP)
Attendance: 100
Referees: Alakbar Hasanov (AZE), Vladan Šundić (MNE), Nadege Anaize Zouzou (CIV)

8 July 2015
20:45

Boxscore

France	72–44	Russia
Scoring by quarter: 14–11, 11–16, 28–10, 19–7
Pts: Johannès 17; Rebs: Gaye 7 Asts: Johannès 4		Pts: Komarova 15; Rebs: Abaiburova 7 Asts: 3 players 2

Pabellon Municipal de Teguise, Teguise – Las Palmas (ESP)
Attendance: 100
Referees: Carlos Santos (POR), Robert Paulik (CZE), Anna Cardus (ESP

=== Group F ===
Team	Pld	W	L	PF	PA	PD	Pts
Spain	5	5	0	332	230	+102	10
Netherlands	5	3	2	324	311	+13	8
Portugal	5	2	3	266	275	−9	7
Italy	5	2	3	284	298	−14	7
Belgium	5	2	3	277	303	−26	7
Hungary	5	1	4	284	350	−66	6

6 July 2015
18:30

Boxscore

Belgium	46–67	Spain
Scoring by quarter: 10–14, 15–14, 8–15, 13–24
Pts: Ben Abdelkader, De Baets 12; Rebs: Grzesinski 8 Asts: De Baets 5		Pts: Lo 14; Rebs: Romero 13; Asts: Romero 7

Pabellon Municipal de Teguise, Teguise – Las Palmas (ESP)
Attendance: 450
Referees: Grzegorz Ziemblicki (POL), Sergey Krug (RUS), Mathieu Hosselet (FRA)

6 July 2015
20:45

Boxscore

Netherlands	68–62	Italy
Scoring by quarter: 23–21, 10–12, 15–15, 20–14
Pts: Slim, Hof 15; Rebs: Slim 11; Asts: Cornelius 4		Pts: Tagliamento 20; Rebs: Zandalasini, Penna 8 Asts: Kacerik 4

Ayuntamento de Tinajo, Tinajo – Las Palmas (ESP)
Attendance: 100
Referees: Charalampos Karakatsounis (GRE), Dariusz Lenczowski (POL), Mykola Ambrosov (UKR)

6 July 2015
20:45

Boxscore

Hungary	46–41	Portugal
Scoring by quarter: 16–20, 7–6, 13–8, 10–7
Pts: Dobos 12; Rebs: Kaposi 9 Asts: 3 players 1		Pts: Kostourkova 17; Rebs: L.Ferreira 10; Asts: Soeiro 5

Pabellon Municipal de Teguise, Teguise – Las Palmas (ESP)
Attendance: 79
Referees: Vladan Šundić (MNE), Milan Brziak (SVK), Özlem Yalman (TUR)

7 July 2015
16:15

Boxscore

Italy	60–64	Portugal
Scoring by quarter: 19–21, 7–15, 20–18, 14–10
Pts: Penna 18; Rebs: Penna 9 Asts: Zandalasini 4		Pts: Filipe 17; Rebs: Kostourkova 10; Asts: Soeiro 7

Pabellon Municipal de Teguise, Teguise – Las Palmas (ESP)
Attendance: 150
Referees: Grzegorz Ziemblicki (POL), Ingus Baumanis (LAT), Sergey Krug (RUS)

7 July 2015
18:30

Boxscore

Spain	63–49	Netherlands
Scoring by quarter: 16–17, 17–11, 17–13, 13–8
Pts: Arrojo 18; Rebs: Romero 7 Asts: Arrojo, Esparcia 4		Pts: Hof 16; Rebs: Ndiba 5 Asts: Cornelius 3

Pabellon Municipal de Teguise, Teguise – Las Palmas (ESP)
Attendance: 500
Referees: Anastasios Manos (GRE), Alakbar Hasanov (AZE), Ilias Kounelles (CYP)

7 July 2015
18:30

Boxscore

Belgium	69–62	Hungary
Scoring by quarter: 16–12, 17–18, 17–16, 19–16
Pts: Ben Abdelkader 27; Rebs: Grzesinski 8 Asts: Grzesinski, H.Nauwelaers 3		Pts: Aldazabal Berroa 13; Rebs: Böröndy 9 Asts: Szabó 2

Ayuntamento de Tinajo, Tinajo – Las Palmas (ESP)
Attendance: 100
Referees: Tomislav Hordov (CRO), Robert Paulik (CZE), Nadege Anaize Zouzou (CIV)

8 July 2015
14:00

Boxscore

Italy	48–46	Belgium
Scoring by quarter: 15–8, 6–14, 16–13, 11–11
Pts: Zandalasini 16; Rebs: Zandalasini 12; Asts: Zandalasini 3		Pts: H.Nauwelaers 15; Rebs: Grzesinski 12; Asts: De Baets 7

Pabellon Municipal de Teguise, Teguise – Las Palmas (ESP)
Attendance: 100
Referees: Milivoje Jovčić (SRB), Ilias Kounelles (CYP), Dariusz Lenczowski (POL)

8 July 2015
16:15

Boxscore

Netherlands	80–62	Hungary
Scoring by quarter: 25–7, 11–20, 24–15, 20–20
Pts: Slim 15; Rebs: Hof 12; Asts: Cornelius 5		Pts: Nagy 15; Rebs: Kaposi 6 Asts: Böröndy 3

Pabellon Municipal de Teguise, Teguise – Las Palmas (ESP)
Attendance: 125
Referees: Sergey Krug (RUS), Milan Brziak (SVK), Özlem Yalman (TUR)

8 July 2015
18:30

Boxscore

Portugal	44–59	Spain
Scoring by quarter: 16–15, 12–12, 7–16, 9–16
Pts: L.Ferreira 11; Rebs: L.Ferreira 7 Asts: Soeiro 5		Pts: Romero 12; Rebs: Arrojo 8 Asts: Arrojo 4

Pabellon Municipal de Teguise, Teguise – Las Palmas (ESP)
Attendance: 500
Referees: Charalampos Karakatsounis (GRE), Tomislav Hordov (CRO), Mathieu Hosselet (FRA)

== Classification Group G ==
Last placed team from each group of first round competes in classification round-robin group for lower four seeds in 9th–16th place playoff.

Pos	Team	Pld	W	L	PF	PA	PD	Pts
1	Serbia	3	3	0	226	202	+24	6
2	Turkey	3	2	1	186	172	+14	5
3	Czech Republic	3	1	2	227	214	+13	4
4	Ukraine	3	0	3	169	220	−51	3

Source: u20women.fibaeurope.com

6 July 2015
14:00

Boxscore

Serbia	81–71	Ukraine
Scoring by quarter: 21–18, 17–17, 19–20, 24–16
Pts: Crvendakić 22, Stanković, Spasojević 18; Rebs: Stanković 10; Asts: Mandić, Spasojević 5		Pts: Gorobets 19, Zhmurko 14; Rebs: Yatskovets 8, Gorobets 7 Asts: Zhmurko 6, Gorobets 5

Ayuntamento de Tinajo, Tinajo – Las Palmas (ESP)
Attendance: 100
Referees: Alakbar Hasanov (AZE), Tamas Földhazi (HUN), Nadege Anaize Zouzou (CIV)

6 July 2015
16:15

Boxscore

Turkey	75–68	Czech Republic
Scoring by quarter: 18–13, 17–12, 13–24, 27–19
Pts: Coklar 20, Senyürek 17; Rebs: Senyürek 11, Coklar 8 Asts: Akbas, Uzun 4		Pts: Kaňuková 15; Rebs: Opočenská 6 Asts: Opočenská 4

Ayuntamento de Tinajo, Tinajo – Las Palmas (ESP)
Attendance: 100
Referees: Ingus Baumanis (LAT), Bert Van Slooten (NED), Ilias Kounelles (CYP)

7 July 2015
14:00

Boxscore

Czech Republic	82–86	Serbia
Scoring by quarter: 28–13, 15–26, 19–22, 20–25
Pts: Moučková 19, Kopecká 18; Rebs: Mainclová, Opočenská 6 Asts: Beránková, Kopecká 5		Pts: Crvendakić 32; Rebs: Stanković 11, Crvendakić 10; Asts: Spasojević 4

Ayuntamento de Tinajo, Tinajo – Las Palmas (ESP)
Attendance: 100
Referees: Alessandro Martolini (ITA), Mathieu Hosselet (FRA), Dariusz Lenczowski (POL)

7 July 2015
16:15

Boxscore

Ukraine	45–62	Turkey
Scoring by quarter: 11–12, 17–11, 8–23, 9–16
Pts: Gorobets 14; Rebs: Antoniuk 13, Yatskovets 12; Asts: Gorobets, Kondus 3		Pts: Akbas, Uzun 14; Rebs: Darinc 9 Asts: Akbas 5

Ayuntamento de Tinajo, Tinajo – Las Palmas (ESP)
Attendance: 100
Referees: Carlos Santos (POR), Milan Brziak (SVK), Anna Cardus (ESP)

8 July 2015
14:00

Boxscore

Czech Republic	77–53	Ukraine
Scoring by quarter: 15–12, 23–7, 18–11, 21–23
Pts: Kopecká, Mircová, Moučková 12; Rebs: Kaňuková 8, Mainclová 7 Asts: Mircová, Moučková 4		Pts: Antoniuk 10; Rebs: Antoniuk 19; Asts: Antoniuk 4

Ayuntamento de Tinajo, Tinajo – Las Palmas (ESP)
Attendance: 100
Referees: Grzegorz Ziemblicki (POL), Vincent Delestrée (BEL), Anastasios Manos (GRE)

8 July 2015
16:15

Boxscore

Serbia	59–49	Turkey
Scoring by quarter: 12–18, 19–6, 18–14, 10–11
Pts: Stanković 16, Crvendakić 14; Rebs: Stanković 12; Asts: Čorda, Mandić 4		Pts: Akbas 16; Rebs: Senyürek 8 Asts: Erat 2

Ayuntamento de Tinajo, Tinajo – Las Palmas (ESP)
Attendance: 100
Referees: Francisco Araña (ESP), Ingus Baumanis (LAT), Tamas Földhazi (HUN)

== Classification playoffs for 9th – 16th place ==
13th place match
E6	Germany	53
F6	Hungary	51
15th place match
G4	Ukraine	66
G3	Czech Republic	96

13th – 16th place playoffs
G4	Ukraine	49
E6	Germany	62
G3	Czech Republic	72
F6	Hungary	76 OT

9th – 16th place playoffs
F5	Belgium	77
G4	Ukraine	51
E6	Germany	53
G1	Serbia	63
E5	Latvia	74
G3	Czech Republic	63
F6	Hungary	59
G2	Turkey	68

9th – 12th place playoffs
F5	Belgium	56
G1	Serbia	64
E5	Latvia	44
G2	Turkey	79

9th place match
G1	Serbia	49
G2	Turkey	70
11th place match
F5	Belgium	57
E5	Latvia	55

=== Classification games for 9th – 16th place ===
10 July 2015
14:00

Boxscore

Belgium	77–51	Ukraine
Scoring by quarter: 28–8, 19–14, 15–12, 15–17
Pts: Ben Abdelkader 26; Rebs: Grzesinski 10; Asts: 3 players 4		Pts: Antoniuk 20; Rebs: Gorobets 11; Asts: Kondus 3

Ayuntamento de Tinajo, Tinajo – Las Palmas (ESP)
Attendance: 100
Referees: Alakbar Hasanov (AZE), Tamas Földhazi (HUN), Dariusz Lenczowski (POL)

10 July 2015
16:15

Boxscore

Germany	53–63	Serbia
Scoring by quarter: 15–15, 15–16, 6–20, 17–12
Pts: Stach 16; Rebs: Hartmann 9 Asts: Körner 4		Pts: Stankovic 21; Rebs: Stankovic 12; Asts: Mandic 5

Ayuntamento de Tinajo, Tinajo – Las Palmas (ESP)
Attendance: 100
Referees: Charalampos Karakatsounis (GRE), Anna Cardus (ESP), Mathieu Hosselet (FRA)

10 July 2015
18:30

Boxscore

Hungary	59–68	Turkey
Scoring by quarter: 17–11, 20–12, 15–25, 7–20
Pts: Szabó, Nagy 12; Rebs: Aldazabal Berroa 10; Asts: 3 players 2		Pts: Coklar 21; Rebs: Coklar 9 Asts: Gülcan 7

Ayuntamento de Tinajo, Tinajo – Las Palmas (ESP)
Attendance: 100
Referees: Sergey Krug (RUS), Carlos Santos (POR), Vincent Delestrée (BEL)

10 July 2015
20:45

Boxscore

Latvia	74–63	Czech Republic
Scoring by quarter: 14–18, 19–13, 18–24, 23–8
Pts: Kudule 16; Rebs: Strautmane 10; Asts: Fridenberga 3		Pts: Opočenská 15; Rebs: Mainclová 9 Asts: 3 players 3

Ayuntamento de Tinajo, Tinajo – Las Palmas (ESP)
Attendance: 100
Referees: Milan Brziak (SVK), Ilias Kounelles (CYP), Nadege Anaize Zouzou (CIV)

=== Classification games for 13th – 16th place ===
11 July 2015
14:00

Boxscore

Ukraine	49–62	Germany
Scoring by quarter: 13–18, 10–15, 16–12, 10–17
Pts: Teleshyk 13; Rebs: Antoniuk 12; Asts: Yatskovets, Skorbatyuk 2		Pts: Hartmann 19; Rebs: Stach 17; Asts: Hartmann 3

Ayuntamento de Tinajo, Tinajo – Las Palmas (ESP)
Attendance: 100
Referees: Robert Paulik (CZE), Özlem Yalman (TUR), Anastasios Manos (GRE)

11 July 2015
16:15

Boxscore

Czech Republic	72–76 (OT)	Hungary
Scoring by quarter: 16–21, 19–7, 15–15, 12–19, Overtime: 10–14
Pts: Mircová 17; Rebs: Mainclová 10; Asts: Kopecká 7		Pts: Nagy 23; Rebs: Nagy 13; Asts: Nagy, Papp 3

Ayuntamento de Tinajo, Tinajo – Las Palmas (ESP)
Attendance: 100
Referees: Francisco Araña (ESP), Ingus Baumanis (LAT), Alessandro Martolini (ITA)

=== Classification games for 9th – 12th place ===
11 July 2015
18:30

Boxscore

Belgium	56–64	Serbia
Scoring by quarter: 16–13, 10–21, 15–15, 15–15
Pts: Ben Abdelkader 21; Rebs: Ben Abdelkader, A.Nauwelaers 8 Asts: A.Nauwelaers 3		Pts: Crvendakic 21; Rebs: Stankovic 16; Asts: Mandic, Corda 3

Ayuntamento de Tinajo, Tinajo – Las Palmas (ESP)
Attendance: 100
Referees: Grzegorz Ziemblicki (POL), Carlos Santos (POR), Mathieu Hosselet (FRA)

11 July 2015
20:45

Boxscore

Latvia	44–79	Turkey
Scoring by quarter: 15–19, 9–23, 4–17, 16–20
Pts: Dzarcane 10; Rebs: Birina 6 Asts: 3 players 1		Pts: Coklar, Senyürek 14; Rebs: Coklar 11; Asts: Uzun 5

Ayuntamento de Tinajo, Tinajo – Las Palmas (ESP)
Attendance: 100
Referees: Vladan Šundić (MNE), Mykola Ambrosov (UKR), Bert Van Slooten (NED)

== Championship playoffs ==
Fifth place
F4	Italy	83
F3	Portugal	71
Seventh place
E3	Slovakia	57
E4	Poland	67

Consolation semifinals
F4	Italy	78
E3	Slovakia	68
E4	Poland	37
F3	Portugal	49

Quarterfinals
E1	France	61
F4	Italy	55
F2	Netherlands	64
E3	Slovakia	55
F1	Spain	71
E4	Poland	52
E2	Russia	68
F3	Portugal	56

Semifinals
E1	France	81
F2	Netherlands	72
F1	Spain	76
E2	Russia	50

Final
E1	France	47
F1	Spain	66
Third place
F2	Netherlands	63
E2	Russia	51

=== Quarterfinals ===
10 July 2015
14:00

Boxscore

France	61–55	Italy
Scoring by quarter: 17–19, 16–11, 14–9, 14–16
Pts: Gaye 17, Johannès, Djaldi-Tabdi 8 Rebs: Gaye 11, Johannès, Naigre, Vidal 5 Asts: Johannès 5		Pts: Zandalasini 20, Peresson 8 Rebs: Ercoli, Penna 4 Asts: Kacerik 3

Pabellon Municipal de Teguise, Teguise – Las Palmas (ESP)
Attendance: 200
Referees: Ingus Baumanis (LAT), Mykola Ambrosov (UKR), Anastasios Manos (GRE)

10 July 2015
16:15

Boxscore

Netherlands	64–55	Slovakia
Scoring by quarter: 16–14, 19–11, 12–16, 17–14
Pts: Hof 20, Boonstra 11; Rebs: Hof, Slim 10, Boonstra 9 Asts: Cornelius 5		Pts: Páleníková 14, Mištinová 12; Rebs: Remenárová 7 Asts: Páleníková 3

Pabellon Municipal de Teguise, Teguise – Las Palmas (ESP)
Attendance: 250
Referees: Grzegorz Ziemblicki (POL), Tomislav Hordov (CRO), Robert Paulik (CZE)

10 July 2015
18:30

Boxscore

Spain	71–52	Poland
Scoring by quarter: 18–6, 11–22, 20–15, 22–9
Pts: Quevedo 16, N. Lo, Romero 15; Rebs: Romero 8, N. Lo, Arrojo 7 Asts: Romero 5, Flores 4		Pts: Rembiszewska 12, Drop 11; Rebs: Szajtauer 9, Ossowska 6 Asts: Naczk 4

Pabellon Municipal de Teguise, Teguise – Las Palmas (ESP)
Attendance: 600
Referees: Milivoje Jovčić (SRB), Vladan Šundić (MNE), Özlem Yalman (TUR)

10 July 2015
20:45

Boxscore

Russia	68–56	Portugal
Scoring by quarter: 16–9, 13–13, 12–20, 27–14
Pts: Komarova 12, Abaiburova, Shchetina 11; Rebs: Sazonova 8, Komarova 6 Asts: Komarova 7		Pts: Ferreira 22, Soeiro 10; Rebs: Ferreira 6, Kostourkova 4 Asts: Filipe, Soeiro 2

Pabellon Municipal de Teguise, Teguise – Las Palmas (ESP)
Attendance: 100
Referees: Francisco Araña (ESP), Alessandro Martolini (ITA), Bert Van Slooten (NED)

=== Classification games for 5th – 8th place ===
11 July 2015
14:00

Boxscore

Italy	78–68	Slovakia
Scoring by quarter: 19–12, 25–14, 23–14, 11–28
Pts: Barberis 15, Tagliamento 13; Rebs: Botteghi 5 Asts: Barberis 4		Pts: Hadačová 11; Rebs: Hadačová 8, Stašová 6 Asts: Mištinová, Urbániová 2

Pabellon Municipal de Teguise, Teguise – Las Palmas (ESP)
Attendance: 100
Referees: Sergey Krug (RUS), Tamas Földhazi (HUN), Dariusz Lenczowski (POL)

11 July 2015
16:15

Boxscore

Poland	37–49	Portugal
Scoring by quarter: 9–16, 9–8, 7–20, 12–5
Pts: Drop 8 Rebs: Grymek 8, Szajtauer 7 Asts: Naczk 6		Pts: Kostourkova 11; Rebs: Kostourkova 14, Ferreira 9 Asts: Soeiro 7

Pabellon Municipal de Teguise, Teguise – Las Palmas (ESP)
Attendance: 175
Referees: Ilias Kounelles (CYP), Vincent Delestrée (BEL), Nadege Anaize Zouzou (CIV)

=== Semifinals ===
11 July 2015
18:30

Boxscore

France	81–72	Netherlands
Scoring by quarter: 20–10, 17–24, 18–22, 26–16
Pts: Naigre 14, Mané 13, Gaye 12; Rebs: Johannès, Vidal 7 Asts: Johannès 5		Pts: Guijt 16, Hof 13, Boonstra 12; Rebs: Slim 12, Boonstra, Cornelius 5 Asts: van Veen 5

Pabellon Municipal de Teguise, Teguise – Las Palmas (ESP)
Attendance: 450
Referees: Milivoje Jovčić (SRB), Anna Cardus (ESP), Alakbar Hasanov (AZE)

11 July 2015
20:45

Boxscore

Spain	76–50	Russia
Scoring by quarter: 26–14, 18–5, 16–14, 16–17
Pts: Romero 17, N. Lo 13; Rebs: Romero 7, N. Lo, Rodriguez, Sole 5 Asts: Romero 7		Pts: Komarova 11, Fedorova 10; Rebs: Komarova 5 Asts: Degtyarskaya, Fedorova, Komarova 2

Pabellon Municipal de Teguise, Teguise – Las Palmas (ESP)
Attendance: 660
Referees: Tomislav Hordov (CRO), Charalampos Karakatsounis (GRE), Milan Brziak (SVK)

== Final classification games ==
=== Match for 15th place ===
12 July 2015
11:15

Boxscore

Ukraine	66–96	Czech Republic
Scoring by quarter: 13–23, 20–12, 22–33, 11–28
Pts: Yatskovets 22; Rebs: Antoniuk 17; Asts: Yatskovets 4		Pts: Kopecká 17; Rebs: Hrušková 6 Asts: Křivánková 5

Ayuntamento de Tinajo, Tinajo – Las Palmas (ESP)
Attendance: 50
Referees: Nadege Anaize Zouzou (CIV), Ingus Baumanis (LAT), Alakbar Hasanov (AZE)

=== Match for 13th place ===
12 July 2015
15:45

Boxscore

Germany	53–51	Hungary
Scoring by quarter: 10–16, 18–4, 13–12, 12–19
Pts: Körner, Hartmann 14; Rebs: Degbeon 17; Asts: Degbeon 3		Pts: Kaposi 16; Rebs: Kaposi 11; Asts: Papp 2

Ayuntamento de Tinajo, Tinajo – Las Palmas (ESP)
Attendance: 50
Referees: Milivoje Jovčić (SRB), Tomislav Hordov (CRO), Anna Cardus (ESP)

=== Match for 11th place ===
12 July 2015
13:30

Boxscore

Belgium	57–55	Latvia
Scoring by quarter: 13–21, 14–14, 12–14, 18–6
Pts: Ben Abdelkader 30; Rebs: Bernard 18; Asts: H.Nauwelaers 3		Pts: D.Strautmane 18; Rebs: D.Strautmane, Dzarcane 10; Asts: P.Strautmane, Kudule 3

Ayuntamento de Tinajo, Tinajo – Las Palmas (ESP)
Attendance: 50
Referees: Charalampos Karakatsounis (GRE), Tamas Földhazi (HUN), Ilias Kounelles (CYP)

=== Match for 9th place ===
12 July 2015
18:00

Boxscore

Serbia	49–70	Turkey
Scoring by quarter: 18–14, 13–20, 9–19, 9–17
Pts: Crvendakic 16; Rebs: Stankovic 11; Asts: Corda 4		Pts: Akbas, Coklar 15; Rebs: Senyürek 17; Asts: Akbas 4

Ayuntamento de Tinajo, Tinajo – Las Palmas (ESP)
Attendance: 50
Referees: Vincent Delestrée (BEL), Milan Brziak (SVK), Dariusz Lenczowski (POL)

=== Match for 7th place ===
12 July 2015
13:30

Boxscore

Slovakia	57–67	Poland
Scoring by quarter: 18–24, 13–14, 12–13, 14–16
Pts: Páleníková 17; Rebs: Dudášová 8 Asts: Dudášová, Urbániová 2		Pts: Wajler 23; Rebs: Szatjauer 8 Asts: Naczk 6

Pabellon Municipal de Teguise, Teguise – Las Palmas (ESP)
Attendance: 50
Referees: Carlos Santos (POR), Bert Van Slooten (NED), Mykola Ambrosov (UKR)

=== Match for 5th place ===
12 July 2015
15:45

Boxscore

Italy	83–71	Portugal
Scoring by quarter: 7–17, 28–14, 28–14, 20–26
Pts: Tagliamento 19; Rebs: Botteghi 6 Asts: Peresson 7		Pts: L.Ferreira 25; Rebs: L.Ferreira 14; Asts: Costa 4

Pabellon Municipal de Teguise, Teguise – Las Palmas (ESP)
Attendance: 500
Referees: Özlem Yalman (TUR), Mathieu Hosselet (FRA), Anastasios Manos (GRE)

=== Bronze medal match ===
12 July 2015
18:00

Boxscore

Netherlands	63–51	Russia
Scoring by quarter: 18–20, 15–6, 11–11, 19–14
Pts: Ndiba 22; Rebs: Ndiba 14; Asts: Cornelius, Hof 3		Pts: Fedorova, Komarova 14; Rebs: Fedorova 9 Asts: Komarova 4

Pabellon Municipal de Teguise, Teguise – Las Palmas (ESP)
Attendance: 700
Referees: Francisco Araña (ESP), Grzegorz Ziemblicki (POL), Alessandro Martolini (ITA)

=== Final ===
12 July 2015
20:15

Boxscore

France	47–66	Spain
Scoring by quarter: 8–17, 12–16, 17–16, 10–17
Pts: Gaye 14; Rebs: Johannès 8 Asts: Johannès 3		Pts: Romero 22; Rebs: Quevedo, Orts 5 Asts: Romero 3

Pabellon Municipal de Teguise, Teguise – Las Palmas (ESP)
Attendance: 1000
Referees: Sergey Krug (RUS), Robert Paulik (CZE), Vladan Šundić (MNE)

== Final standings ==
Rank	Team	Record
1st place, gold medalist(s) Gold	Spain	9–0
2nd place, silver medalist(s) Silver	France	8–1
3rd place, bronze medalist(s) Bronze	Netherlands	6–3
4th	Russia	5–4
5th	Italy	5–4
6th	Portugal	4–5
7th	Poland	4–5
8th	Slovakia	4–5
9th	Turkey	5–4
10th	Serbia	5–4
11th	Belgium	5–4
12th	Latvia	4–5
13th	Germany	3–6
14th	Hungary	3–6
15th	Czech Republic	2–7
16th	Ukraine	0–9

2015 FIBA Europe Women's Under-20 Championship winners

Spain
Fifth title

Most Valuable Player
Leticia Romero

Team relegated to 2016 FIBA U20 Women's European Championship Division B

== Awards ==
Most Valuable Player
(Spain) Leticia Romero

=== All-Tournament Team ===
- (Spain) Leticia Romero
- (Spain) Laura Quevedo
- (France) Marine Johannès
- (France) Aby Gaye
- (Netherlands) Emese Hof
