= 2011 FIBA Europe Under-16 Championship for Women Division B =

Tournament details
- Host country: Romania
- City: Arad
- Dates: 11–21 August 2011
- Teams: 15 (from 1 confederation)
- Venues: 2 (in 1 host city)

Final positions
- Champions: Germany (1st title)
- Runners-up: England
- Third place: Latvia

Official website
- www.fibaeurope.com

The 2011 FIBA Europe Under-16 Championship for Women Division B was the 8th edition of the Division B of the European basketball championship for women's national under-16 teams. It was played in Arad, Romania, from 11 to 21 August 2011. Germany women's national under-16 basketball team won the tournament.

== Participating teams ==
- Bulgaria
- Denmark
- England
- Estonia
- Germany
- Ireland
- Israel
- Latvia
- Lithuania ▼ (16th place, 2010 FIBA Europe Under-16 Championship for Women Division A)
- Luxembourg
- Portugal
- Romania
- Slovenia
- Switzerland
- Ukraine

== Group stages ==
=== Preliminary round ===
In this round, the sixteen teams were allocated in four groups of four teams each. The top three qualified for the next round. The last team of each group played for the 13th–16th place in the classification games.

| Team advanced to Qualifying Round |
| Team competed in Classification Round |

==== Group A ====
| Team | Pld | W | L | PF | PA | PD | Pts |
|---|---|---|---|---|---|---|---|
| Portugal | 3 | 3 | 0 | 185 | 127 | +58 | 6 |
| Latvia | 3 | 2 | 1 | 186 | 153 | +33 | 5 |
| Ukraine | 3 | 1 | 2 | 173 | 162 | +11 | 4 |
| Luxembourg | 3 | 0 | 3 | 131 | 233 | -102 | 3 |

August 11
19:00

Report

| Ukraine | 90–55 | Luxembourg |
Scoring by quarter: 21-12, 22-13, 18-10, 29-20
| Pts: Skorbatyuk 16; Rebs: Batrakova 18; Asts: Popova 6 | | Pts: Bidinger 11; Rebs: Scheer 9 Asts: Frieden 3 |

Referees: Doru Vinasi (ROU), Evgeny Vetrov (RUS), Sebastien Clivaz (SUI)

August 11
19:00

Report

| Portugal | 69–57 | Latvia |
Scoring by quarter: 22-19, 9-12, 12-8, 21-18
| Pts: Ferreira 17; Rebs: Soeiro 10; Asts: Soeiro 4 | | Pts: Vetra 10; Rebs: Miscenko 7 Asts: Miscenko, Laksa 2 |

Attendance: 50
Referees: Albi Greva (ALB), Zafer Yilmaz (TUR), Laszlo Bukuresti (ROU)

August 12
19:00

Report

| Luxembourg | 34–66 | Portugal |
Scoring by quarter: 18-13, 7-24, 4-22, 5-7
| Pts: Jablonowski 9 Rebs: Jablonowski 7 Asts: Bidinger 2 | | Pts: Ferreira 16; Rebs: Ferreira, Leal Cortinhas 6 Asts: Soeiro 6 |

Attendance: 100

August 12
19:00

Report

| Latvia | 52–47 | Ukraine |
Scoring by quarter: 12-9, 17-11, 11-15, 12-12
| Pts: Laksa 20; Rebs: Miscenko, Strautmane 6 Asts: Laksa 2 | | Pts: Skorbatyuk 13; Rebs: Zhmurko, Batrakova 9 Asts: Popova 4 |

Attendance: 100

August 13
19:00

Report

| Latvia | 77–42 | Luxembourg |
Scoring by quarter: 21-12, 15-12, 17-12, 24-6
| Pts: Laksa 20; Rebs: three players 7 Asts: Vetra 5 | | Pts: Jablonowski 9 Rebs: Jablonowski 10; Asts: Bidinger, Jablonowski 2 |

Attendance: 100

August 13
19:00

Report

| Ukraine | 36–55 | Portugal |
Scoring by quarter: 7-17, 8-17, 7-10, 14-11
| Pts: Kunda 11; Rebs: Antonyuk, Polovynka 10; Asts: Polovynka 4 | | Pts: Soeiro 18; Rebs: Soeiro 11; Asts: Soeiro 4 |

Attendance: 100

==== Group B ====
| Team | Pld | W | L | PF | PA | PD | Pts |
|---|---|---|---|---|---|---|---|
| Slovenia | 2 | 2 | 0 | 133 | 102 | +31 | 4 |
| England | 2 | 1 | 1 | 109 | 103 | +6 | 3 |
| Estonia | 2 | 0 | 2 | 83 | 120 | -37 | 2 |

August 11
14:30

Report

| England | 49–41 | Estonia |
Scoring by quarter: 7-11, 27-9, 9-11, 6-10
| Pts: Joseph 19; Rebs: Monakana 11; Asts: McDerment 3 | | Pts: Kasemägi 17; Rebs: Kasemägi 20; Asts: Svilberg, Roosalu 2 |

Attendance: 100
Referees: Borislav Peltekov (BUL), Martynas Gudas (LTU), David Romano (ISR)

August 11
16:45

Report

| Estonia | 42–71 | Slovenia |
Scoring by quarter: 7-18, 10-21, 10-19, 15-13
| Pts: Tamp 9 Rebs: Kasemägi 6 Asts: Lass 4 | | Pts: Lisec 15; Rebs: three players 7 Asts: Potocnik 5 |

Attendance: 100

August 12
14:30

Report

| Slovenia | 62–60 | England |
Scoring by quarter: 18-16, 9-11, 21-13, 14-20
| Pts: Valentincic 17; Rebs: Lisec 9 Asts: Lisec, Potocnik 2 | | Pts: Green 18; Rebs: Green, Joseph 9 Asts: three players 2 |

Attendance: 100

==== Group C ====
| Team | Pld | W | L | PF | PA | PD | Pts |
|---|---|---|---|---|---|---|---|
| Lithuania | 3 | 3 | 0 | 184 | 150 | +34 | 6 |
| Romania | 3 | 2 | 1 | 182 | 175 | +7 | 5 |
| Bulgaria | 3 | 1 | 2 | 178 | 182 | +4 | 4 |
| Israel | 3 | 0 | 3 | 153 | 190 | -37 | 3 |

August 11
19:00

| Romania | 47–62 | Lithuania |
Scoring by quarter: 5-17, 8-20, 14-11, 20-14
| Pts: Raileanu 16; Rebs: Blanaru 7 Asts: Blanaru, Gavrila 2 | | Pts: Kraujunaite 17; Rebs: Ceponyte 9 Asts: Sirsinaityte 4 |

Attendance: 100
Referees: Marko Vuckovic (SLO), Aare Halliko (EST), Paul Walton (ENG)

August 11
21:15

Report

| Bulgaria | 65–50 | Israel |
Scoring by quarter: 19-18, 8-8, 18-7, 20-17
| Pts: Hristova 28; Rebs: Hristova 10; Asts: four players 1 | | Pts: Banet 15; Rebs: Grinspan 8 Asts: Banet, Sapir 2 |

Attendance: 100
Referees: Gianluca Mattioli (ITA), Andrei Bostan (MDA), Christof Madinger (GER)

August 12
16:45

Report

| Lithuania | 68–55 | Bulgaria |
Scoring by quarter: 18-10, 20-17, 16-12, 14-16
| Pts: Belickaite 21; Rebs: Putramentaite 15; Asts: Kraujunaite 5 | | Pts: Aksentieva 19; Rebs: Hristova 13; Asts: Hristova, Kamburova 1 |

Attendance: 100

August 12
19:00

Report

| Israel | 55–71 | Romania |
Scoring by quarter: 18-14, 9-26, 12-19, 16-12
| Pts: Zelivanski 12; Rebs: Grinspan 9 Asts: Yeruham 2 | | Pts: Raileanu 19; Rebs: Raileanu 13; Asts: Vasilache 5 |

Attendance: 100

August 13
14:30

Report

| Lithuania | 54–48 | Israel |
Scoring by quarter: 12-4, 14-15, 10-11, 18-18
| Pts: Kraujunaite 18; Rebs: Mizgeryte 8 Asts: Kraujunaite, Dalia Belickaite 4 | | Pts: Abboud 11; Rebs: Eden Porat, Drosvit 6 Asts: Grinspan 2 |

Attendance: 50

August 13
21:15

Report

| Bulgaria | 58–64 | Romania |
Scoring by quarter: 15-15, 11-13, 21-13, 11-23
| Pts: Hristova 22; Rebs: Aksentieva, Tanya Eneva 5 Asts: Aksentieva 3 | | Pts: Lenart 15; Rebs: Manea 8 Asts: three players 3 |

Attendance: 300

==== Group D ====
| Team | Pld | W | L | PF | PA | PD | Pts |
|---|---|---|---|---|---|---|---|
| Germany | 3 | 3 | 0 | 217 | 133 | +84 | 6 |
| Denmark | 3 | 2 | 1 | 203 | 156 | +47 | 5 |
| Switzerland | 3 | 1 | 2 | 157 | 183 | –26 | 4 |
| Ireland | 3 | 0 | 3 | 133 | 238 | –105 | 3 |

August 11
13:30

Report

| Ireland | 43–74 | Switzerland |
Scoring by quarter: 10–24, 11–13, 9–23, 13–14
| Pts: Mcgrath 17; Rebs: Crowley 4 Asts: Sullivan 7 | | Pts: Milenkovic 19; Rebs: Zali 5 Asts: Zali 11 |

Attendance: 100
Referees: Viktor Bozhenar (UKR), Vladan Sundic (MNE), Athanasios Ikonomou (SWE)

August 11
15:45

Report

| Denmark | 55–61 | Germany |
Scoring by quarter: 13–15, 9–17, 6–16, 27–13
| Pts: Preetzmann 13; Rebs: Scheel 8 Asts: Preetzmann 3 | | Pts: three players 15; Rebs: Rouault 10; Asts: Aha 3 |

Attendance: 100
Referees: Marjan Micevski (MKD), Dariusz Szczerba (POL), Jose Abreu (POR)

August 12
16:45

Report

| Germany | 80–43 | Ireland |
Scoring by quarter: 22–11, 25–4, 11–15, 22–13
| Pts: Janko 19; Rebs: Degbeon 14; Asts: Aha 3 | | Pts: Crowley, Namee 8 Rebs: Crowley 7 Asts: Sheehan 3 |

Attendance: 100

August 12
20:15

Report

| Switzerland | 48–64 | Denmark |
Scoring by quarter: 14-22, 9-4, 17-24, 8-14
| Pts: Sohm 10; Rebs: Zali 8 Asts: Oti-Amoako 2 | | Pts: Preetzmann 21; Rebs: Mollerup 14; Asts: Fisker 4 |

Attendance: 100

August 13
15:45

| Ireland | 47–84 | Denmark |
Scoring by quarter: 14-19, 13-23, 8-24, 12-18
| Pts: Erin Leigh Bracken 9 Rebs: Jessica Blue O Sullivan 6 Asts: Lorna Mc Namee, Jennifer Sheehan 2 | | Pts: Julie Hoeier 21; Rebs: Julie Hoeier 14; Asts: Eva Elisabeth Bonde 3 |

Attendance: 50

August 13
20:15

Report

| Germany | 76–35 | Switzerland |
Scoring by quarter: 16-9, 12-9, 23-6, 25-11
| Pts: Stach 23; Rebs: Rouault 16; Asts: Aha 4 | | Pts: Sakica 12; Rebs: Milenkovic 6 Asts: Tolusso 3 |

Attendance: 100

=== Qualifying round ===
The twelve teams remaining were allocated in two groups of six teams each. The four top teams advanced to the quarterfinals. The last two teams of each group played for the 9th–12th place.

| Team advanced to Quarterfinals |
| Team competed in 9th–12th playoffs |

==== Group E ====
| Team | Pld | W | L | PF | PA | PD | Pts |
|---|---|---|---|---|---|---|---|
| England | 5 | 4 | 1 | 277 | 247 | +30 | 9 |
| Portugal | 5 | 4 | 1 | 303 | 231 | +72 | 9 |
| Latvia | 5 | 2 | 3 | 286 | 301 | +15 | 7 |
| Ukraine | 5 | 2 | 3 | 231 | 238 | +7 | 7 |
| Slovenia | 5 | 2 | 3 | 284 | 288 | -4 | 7 |
| Estonia | 5 | 1 | 4 | 223 | 299 | -76 | 6 |

August 15
14:30

| Estonia | 31–73 | Portugal |
Scoring by quarter: 8-20, 4-11, 13-27, 6-15
| Pts: Razguliajeva 7 Rebs: Kasemägi 8 Asts: Svilberg 2 | | Pts: Ferreira 17; Rebs: Silva 6 Asts: Ferreira 3 |

Pala Rockefeller, Cagliari
Attendance: 100
Referees: Doru Vinasi (ROU), Evgeny Vetrov (RUS), Vladan Sundic (MNE)

August 15
16:45

Report

| England | 61–55 | Latvia |
Scoring by quarter: 19-10, 15-13, 7-13, 20-19
| Pts: Monakana 17; Rebs: Monakana 12; Asts: Harriott 3 | | Pts: Laksa 16; Rebs: Vetra 5 Asts: Kreslina 4 |

Pala Rockefeller, Cagliari
Attendance: 100
Referees: Gianluca Mattioli (ITA), Martynas Gudas (LTU), Christof Madinger (GER)

August 15
19:00

Report

| Ukraine | 63–37 | Slovenia |
Scoring by quarter: 17-9, 18-9, 10-9, 18-10
| Pts: Batrakova 27; Rebs: Antonyuk 22; Asts: Skorbatyuk 3 | | Pts: Lesek 6 Rebs: Dimec 6 Asts: five players 1 |

Palazzeto Quartu S. Elena, Cagliari
Attendance: 100
Referees: Borislav Peltekov (BUL), Andrei Bostan (MDA)

August 16
16:45

Report

| Portugal | 51–54 | England |
Scoring by quarter: 11-20, 10-8, 17-12, 13-15
| Pts: Soeiro 25; Rebs: Ferreira, Guerreiro 8 Asts: Ferreira, Guerreiro 2 | | Pts: Joseph 14; Rebs: Monakana 13; Asts: three players 3 |

Pala Rockefeller, Cagliari
Attendance: 50
Referees: Dariusz Szczerba (POL), Andrei Bostan (MDA), Laszlo Bukuresti (ROU)

August 16
19:00

Report

| Estonia | 42–47 | Ukraine |
Scoring by quarter: 9-10, 6-6, 18-17, 9-14
| Pts: Svilberg 11; Rebs: Svilberg 10; Asts: Svilberg, Tamp 2 | | Pts: Skorbatyuk 16; Rebs: Antonyuk 14; Asts: Skorbatyuk, Khomiak 2 |

Palazzeto Quartu S. Elena, Cagliari
Attendance: 100
Referees: Albi Greva (ALB), Christof Madinger (GER), Athanasios Ikonomou (SWE)

August 16
21:15

Report

| Latvia | 63–62 | Slovenia |
Scoring by quarter: 8-18, 20-12, 26-23, 9-9
| Pts: Laksa 20; Rebs: three players 6 Asts: Kreslina 3 | | Pts: Ocvirk 16; Rebs: Lisec 15; Asts: Potocnik 2 |

Palazzeto Quartu S. Elena, Cagliari
Attendance: 100
Referees: Doru Vinasi (ROU), Martynas Gudas (LTU), Zafer Yilmaz (TUR)

August 17
19:00

Report

| England | 52–38 | Ukraine |
Scoring by quarter: 6-7, 14-12, 16-7, 16-12
| Pts: Harriott 17; Rebs: Green 12; Asts: McDerment 3 | | Pts: Popova 11; Rebs: Antonyuk 14; Asts: Khomiak 3 |

Palazzeto Quartu S. Elena, Cagliari
Attendance: 50
Referees: Doru Vinasi (ROU), Martynas Gudas (LTU), Vladan Sundic (MNE)

August 17
21:15

Report

| Slovenia | 52–60 | Portugal |
Scoring by quarter: 18-14, 7-15, 15-12, 12-19
| Pts: Potocnik 15; Rebs: Lisec 16; Asts: Potocnik 2 | | Pts: Ferreira 18; Rebs: Filipe 11; Asts: Soeiro 3 |

Palazzeto Quartu S. Elena, Cagliari
Attendance: 50
Referees: Gianluca Mattioli (ITA), Borislav Peltekov (BUL), Christof Madinger (GER)

August 17
21:15

Report

| Latvia | 59–67 | Estonia |
Scoring by quarter: 15-22, 16-10, 14-19, 12-16
| Pts: Kreslina 17; Rebs: Dzarcane 12; Asts: Laksa 4 | | Pts: Razguliajeva 18; Rebs: Svilberg, Kasemägi 11; Asts: Tamp 3 |

Pala Rockefeller, Cagliari
Attendance: 70
Referees: Dariusz Szczerba (POL), Evgeny Vetrov (RUS), Laszlo Bukuresti (ROU)

==== Group F ====
| Team | Pld | W | L | PF | PA | PD | Pts |
|---|---|---|---|---|---|---|---|
| Germany | 5 | 5 | 0 | 351 | 266 | +85 | 10 |
| Lithuania | 5 | 4 | 1 | 334 | 282 | +52 | 9 |
| Bulgaria | 5 | 2 | 3 | 316 | 312 | +4 | 7 |
| Romania | 5 | 2 | 3 | 285 | 299 | -14 | 7 |
| Denmark | 5 | 2 | 3 | 303 | 301 | -2 | 7 |
| Switzerland | 5 | 0 | 5 | 224 | 353 | -129 | 5 |

August 15
19:00

Report

| Switzerland | 52–84 | Lithuania |
Scoring by quarter: 11-23, 15-20, 13-19, 13-22
| Pts: Milenkovic 12; Rebs: Sohm 8 Asts: three players 2 | | Pts: Kraujunaite 19; Rebs: Putramentaite 14; Asts: Belickaite 5 |

Pala Rockefeller, Cagliari
Attendance: 50
Referees: Aare Halliko (EST), Albi Greva (ALB), Paul Walton (ENG)

August 15
21:15

| Denmark | 61–56 | Romania |
Scoring by quarter: 9-13, 10-14, 19-12, 23-17
| Pts: Mollerup 15; Rebs: Preetzmann 8 Asts: Fisker 4 | | Pts: Avram 22; Rebs: Avram 12; Asts: Blanaru 3 |

Palazzeto Quartu S. Elena, Cagliari
Attendance: 143
Referees: Marko Vuckovic (SLO), Athanasios Ikonomou (SWE), David Romano (ISR)

August 15
21:15

Report

| Bulgaria | 62–78 | Germany |
Scoring by quarter: 20-23, 17-14, 7-22, 18-19
| Pts: Hristova 25; Rebs: Hristova 7 Asts: Hristova 4 | | Pts: Rouault 28; Rebs: Rouault 17; Asts: Stach 8 |

Pala Rockefeller, Cagliari
Attendance: 48
Referees: Dariusz Szczerba (POL), Viktor Bozhenar (UKR), Zafer Yilmaz (TUR)

August 16
14:30

Report

| Lithuania | 69–66 | Denmark |
Scoring by quarter: 22-15, 13-12, 16-10, 18-19
| Pts: Kraujunaite 24; Rebs: Putramentaite 12; Asts: Sirsinaityte 3 | | Pts: Preetzmann 22; Rebs: HoeierFisker 8 Asts: Preetzmann 3 |

Pala Rockefeller, Cagliari
Attendance: 50
Referees: Viktor Bozhenar (UKR), Vladan Sundic (MNE), Sebastien Clivaz (SUI)

August 16
19:00

Report

| Romania | 63–74 | Germany |
Scoring by quarter: 8-23, 16-19, 19-17, 20-15
| Pts: Blanaru 17; Rebs: Lenart 8 Asts: Vasilache 2 | | Pts: Stach 19; Rebs: Rouault 18; Asts: Aha 5 |

Pala Rockefeller, Cagliari
Attendance: 100
Referees: Gianluca Mattioli (ITA), Aare Halliko (EST), Paul Walton (ENG)

August 16
21:15

Report

| Switzerland | 45–74 | Bulgaria |
Scoring by quarter: 7-22, 16-15, 11-16, 11-20
| Pts: Zali 23; Rebs: Zali 12; Asts: three players 1 | | Pts: Hristova 29; Rebs: Hristova 11; Asts: Zhelyazkova 4 |

Pala Rockefeller, Cagliari
Attendance: 50
Referees: Marko Vuckovic (SLO), Marjan Micevski (MKD), David Romano (ISR)

August 17
14:30

Report

| Denmark | 57–67 | Bulgaria |
Scoring by quarter: 20-13, 9-17, 17-21, 9-17
| Pts: Preetzmann 17; Rebs: Preetzmann 12; Asts: Mollerup 3 | | Pts: Hristova 21; Rebs: Kamburova 11; Asts: Jekova 5 |

Pala Rockefeller, Cagliari
Attendance: 80
Referees: Aare Halliko (EST), Albi Greva (ALB), Athanasios Ikonomou (SWE)

August 17
16:45

Report

| Romania | 55–44 | Switzerland |
Scoring by quarter: 11-19, 19-10, 12-6, 13-9
| Pts: Avram 15; Rebs: Avram 9 Asts: Blanaru 5 | | Pts: Zali 11; Rebs: Zali 10; Asts: Sohm 3 |

Pala Rockefeller, Cagliari
Attendance: 500
Referees: Viktor Bozhenar (UKR), Marjan Micevski (MKD), Jose Abreu (POR)

August 17
19:00

Report

| Germany | 62–51 | Lithuania |
Scoring by quarter: 16-19, 18-17, 12-9, 16-6
| Pts: Stach 17; Rebs: Rouault 14; Asts: Schlüter 4 | | Pts: Belickaite 22; Rebs: three players 6 Asts: Sirsinaityte 4 |

Pala Rockefeller, Cagliari
Attendance: 100
Referees: Marko Vuckovic (SLO), Andrei Bostan (MDA), David Romano (ISR)

=== Classification round ===
The last teams of each group in the preliminary round will compete in this Classification Round. The three teams will play in one group. The last two teams will be relegated to Division C for the next season.

| Team will be relegated to Division C. |

==== Group G ====
| Team | Pld | W | L | PF | PA | PD | Pts |
|---|---|---|---|---|---|---|---|
| Israel | 2 | 2 | 0 | 168 | 111 | +57 | 4 |
| Luxembourg | 1 | 0 | 1 | 49 | 71 | -22 | 1 |
| Ireland | 1 | 0 | 1 | 62 | 97 | -35 | 1 |

August 15
14:30

Report

| Luxembourg | 62–97 | Israel |
Scoring by quarter: 16-21, 13-26, 15-29, 18-21
| Pts: Sanelli 15; Rebs: Jablonowski 11; Asts: four players 2 | | Pts: Banet 24; Rebs: Porat 8 Asts: Radt 4 |

Palazzeto Quartu S. Elena, Cagliari
Attendance: 50
Referees: Marjan Micevski (MKD), Laszlo Bukuresti (ROU), Sebastien Clivaz (SUI)

August 15
16:45

Report

| Israel | 71–49 | Ireland |
Scoring by quarter: 21-10, 21-15, 11-8, 18-16
| Pts: Abboud 13; Rebs: Drosvit 11; Asts: Sapir 3 | | Pts: Massey 12; Rebs: Mc Namee 6 Asts: Crowley 3 |

Palazzeto Quartu S. Elena, Cagliari
Attendance: 50
Referees: Borislav Peltekov (BUL), Evgeny Vetrov (RUS), Jose Abreu (POR)

August 16
14:30

Report

| Ireland | 54–70 | Luxembourg |
Scoring by quarter: 12-20, 20-16, 10-13, 10-21
| Pts: Mcgrath 13; Rebs: Mc Namee 10; Asts: Moloney, Donnell 2 | | Pts: Goergen, Pauly 14; Rebs: Goergen, Pauly 12; Asts: Bidinger 4 |

Palazzeto Quartu S. Elena, Cagliari
Attendance: 50
Referees: Paul Walton (ENG), Zafer Yilmaz (TUR), Sebastien Clivaz (SUI)

August 16
16:45

| Israel | vs. | Luxembourg |

Pala Rockefeller, Cagliari

August 17
14:30

| Ireland | vs. | Israel |

Palazzeto Quartu S. Elena, Cagliari

August 17
16:45

| Luxembourg | vs. | Israel |

Palazzeto Quartu S. Elena, Cagliari

== Knockout round ==
=== Championship ===
Quarter-finals
August 19
England | 63
Romania | 50
August 19
Germany | 85
Ukraine | 79
August 19
Portugal | 59
Bulgaria | 61
August 19
Lithuania | 52
Latvia | 67

Semi-finals
August 20
England | 51
Latvia | 40
August 20
Bulgaria | 64
Germany | 71

Final
August 21
England | 63
Germany | 66
Third place
August 21
Latvia | 84
Bulgaria | 52

==== Quarterfinals ====
August 19
14:30

Report

| England | 63–50 | Romania |
Scoring by quarter: 19-7, 15-14, -15-16, 14-13
| Pts: Joseph 20; Rebs: Green 16; Asts: Joseph 4 | | Pts: Pasca 15; Rebs: Pasca 9 Asts: Gavrila 2 |

Pala Rockefeller, Cagliari
Attendance: 50
Referees: Marko Vuckovic (SLO), Borislav Peltekov (BUL), Athanasios Ikonomou (SWE)

August 19
16:45

Report

| Germany | 85–79 | Ukraine |
Scoring by quarter: 14-23, 24-8, 16-15, 22-30
| Pts: Rouault, Stach 28; Rebs: Rouault 14; Asts: four players 2 | | Pts: Skorbatyuk 25; Rebs: Batrakova 12; Asts: Popova 4 |

Pala Rockefeller, Cagliari
Attendance: 50
Referees: Aare Halliko (EST), Evgeny Vetrov (RUS), Paul Walton (ENG)

August 19
19:00

Report

| Portugal | 59–61 | Bulgaria |
Scoring by quarter: 23-8, 13-16, 14-15, 9-22
| Pts: Ferreira 15; Rebs: Filipe 10; Asts: Soeiro 6 | | Pts: Hristova 30; Rebs: Kamburova 8 Asts: Hristova, Georgieva 2 |

Pala Rockefeller, Cagliari
Attendance: 100
Referees: Doru Vinasi (ROU), Andrei Bostan (MDA), David Romano (ISR)

August 19
21:15

Report

| Lithuania | 52–67 | Latvia |
Scoring by quarter: 11-17, 9-23, 14-19, 18-8
| Pts: Kraujunaite 14; Rebs: Ceponyte 9 Asts: three players 1 | | Pts: Spigule 16; Rebs: Dzarcane 14; Asts: four players 2 |

Pala Rockefeller, Cagliari
Attendance: 80
Referees: Gianluca Mattioli (ITA), Viktor Bozhenar (UKR), Christof Madinger (GER)

==== Semifinals ====
August 20
19:00

Report

| England | 51–40 | Latvia |
Scoring by quarter: 8-9, 11-6, 17-11, 15-14
| Pts: Harriott 15; Rebs: Green 14; Asts: Joseph 3 | | Pts: Dzarcane 11; Rebs: Dzarcane 8 Asts: Laksa 2 |

Pala Rockefeller, Cagliari
Attendance: 200
Referees: Aare Halliko (EST), Dariusz Szczerba (POL), David Romano (ISR)

August 20
21:15

Report

| Bulgaria | 64–71 | Germany |
Scoring by quarter: 13-17, 21-19, 11-16, 4-11
| Pts: Hristova 26; Rebs: Hristova 7 Asts: Hristova 4 | | Pts: Stach 19; Rebs: Rouault 27; Asts: Stach 8 |

Pala Rockefeller, Cagliari
Attendance: 300
Referees: Gianluca Mattioli (ITA), Martynas Gudas (LTU), Zafer Yilmaz (TUR)

==== Bronze medal game ====
August 21
19:00

Report

| Latvia | 84–52 | Bulgaria |
Scoring by quarter: 20-11, 18-11, 22-20, 24-10
| Pts: Visnevica 19; Rebs: Miscenko 11; Asts: three players 3 | | Pts: Hristova 28; Rebs: Hristova 6 Asts: Valchinova 3 |

Pala Rockefeller, Cagliari
Attendance: 200
Referees: Marko Vuckovic (SLO), Christof Madinger (GER), Paul Walton (ENG)

==== Final ====
August 21
19:45

Report

| England | 63–66 | Germany |
Scoring by quarter: 15-20, 14-16, 16-16, 18-14
| Pts: Harriott 24; Rebs: Monakana 10; Asts: McDerment 5 | | Pts: Degbeon 17; Rebs: Rouault 10; Asts: Stach 6 |

Arad
Attendance: 700
Referees: Doru Vinasi (ROU), Viktor Bozhenar (UKR), Evgeny Vetrov (RUS)

=== 5th–8th playoffs ===
Semi-finals
August 20 – Cagliari
Romania | 60
Lithuania | 67
August 20 – Cagliari
Portugal | 55
Ukraine | 56

Fifth place
August 21 – Cagliari
Lithuania | 83
Ukraine | 68
Seventh place
August 21 – Cagliari
Romania | 54
Portugal | 62

==== 5th–8th semifinals ====
August 20
14:30

Report

| Romania | 60–67 | Lithuania |
Scoring by quarter: 20-12, 19-23, 8-18, 13-14
| Pts: Avram 20; Rebs: Avram 9 Asts: Maxim 4 | | Pts: Belickaite 21; Rebs: Putramentaite 16; Asts: Kraujunaite 6 |

Pala Rockefeller, Cagliari
Attendance: 450
Referees: Evgeny Vetrov (RUS), Christof Madinger (GER), Vladan Sundic (MNE)

August 20
16:45

Report

| Portugal | 55–56 | Ukraine |
Scoring by quarter: 17-11, 16-15, 9-19, 13-11
| Pts: Ferreira 19; Rebs: Filipe 9 Asts: Ferreira 4 | | Pts: Antonyuk 26; Rebs: Antonyuk 16; Asts: Antonyuk 3 |

Pala Rockefeller, Cagliari
Attendance: 100
Referees: Borislav Peltekov (BUL), Albi Greva (ALB), Laszlo Bukuresti (ROU)

==== 7th place playoff ====
August 21
14:30

| Romania | 54–62 | Portugal |
Scoring by quarter: 13-19, 13-16, 11-13, 17-14

Pala Rockefeller, Cagliari

==== 5th place playoff ====
August 21
16:45

| Lithuania | 83–68 | Ukraine |
Scoring by quarter: 16-21, 31-13, 17-18, 19-16

Pala Rockefeller, Cagliari

=== 9th–12th playoffs ===
Semi-finals
August 19
Slovenia | 82
Switzerland | 56
August 19
Denmark | 51
Estonia | 59

Ninth place
August 20
Slovenia | 59
Estonia | 45
Eleventh place
August 20
Switzerland | 60
Denmark | 70

==== 9th–12th semifinals ====
August 19
16:30

| Slovenia | vs. | Switzerland |

Palazzeto Quartu S. Elena, Cagliari

August 19
19:00

| Denmark | vs. | Estonia |

Palazzeto Quartu S. Elena, Cagliari

==== 11th place playoff ====
August 21
14:30

| Loser E5/F6 | vs. | loser F5/E6 |

==== 9th place playoff ====
August 21
16:45

| Winner E5/F6 | vs. | Winner F5/E6 |

== Final standings ==
| Promoted to the 2012 FIBA Europe Under-16 Championship for Women Division A |

| Rank | Team |
|---|---|
| Gold medal | Germany |
| Silver medal | England |
| Bronze medal | Latvia |
| 4th | Bulgaria |
| 5th | Lithuania |
| 6th | Ukraine |
| 7th | Portugal |
| 8th | Romania |
| 9th | Slovenia |
| 10th | Estonia |
| 11th | Denmark |
| 12th | Switzerland |
| 13th | Israel |
| 14th | Luxembourg |
| 15th | Ireland |
