= Cuchillo =

Cuchillo, a Spanish word for a knife, may refer to:

- Cuchillo (film), a 1978 film with Mexican actor Andrés García
- Cuchillo, New Mexico, an unincorporated community
- Cuchillo-Có, a village in La Pampa Province in Argentina
- El Cuchillo, a village in Tinajo, Las Palmas province of western Lanzarote in the Canary Islands
- a knife as used in Eskrima, an umbrella term for the traditional martial arts of the Philippines
- a character (a Mexican drug cartel enforcer) played by Danny Trejo in the film Predators, see : List of Predator characters

== See also ==
- Cuchillo Negro, the Spanish name of Baishan (c. 1816–1857), a Chihenne Apache chieftain
