= Nogaye Lo =

Spanish basketball player (born 1996)

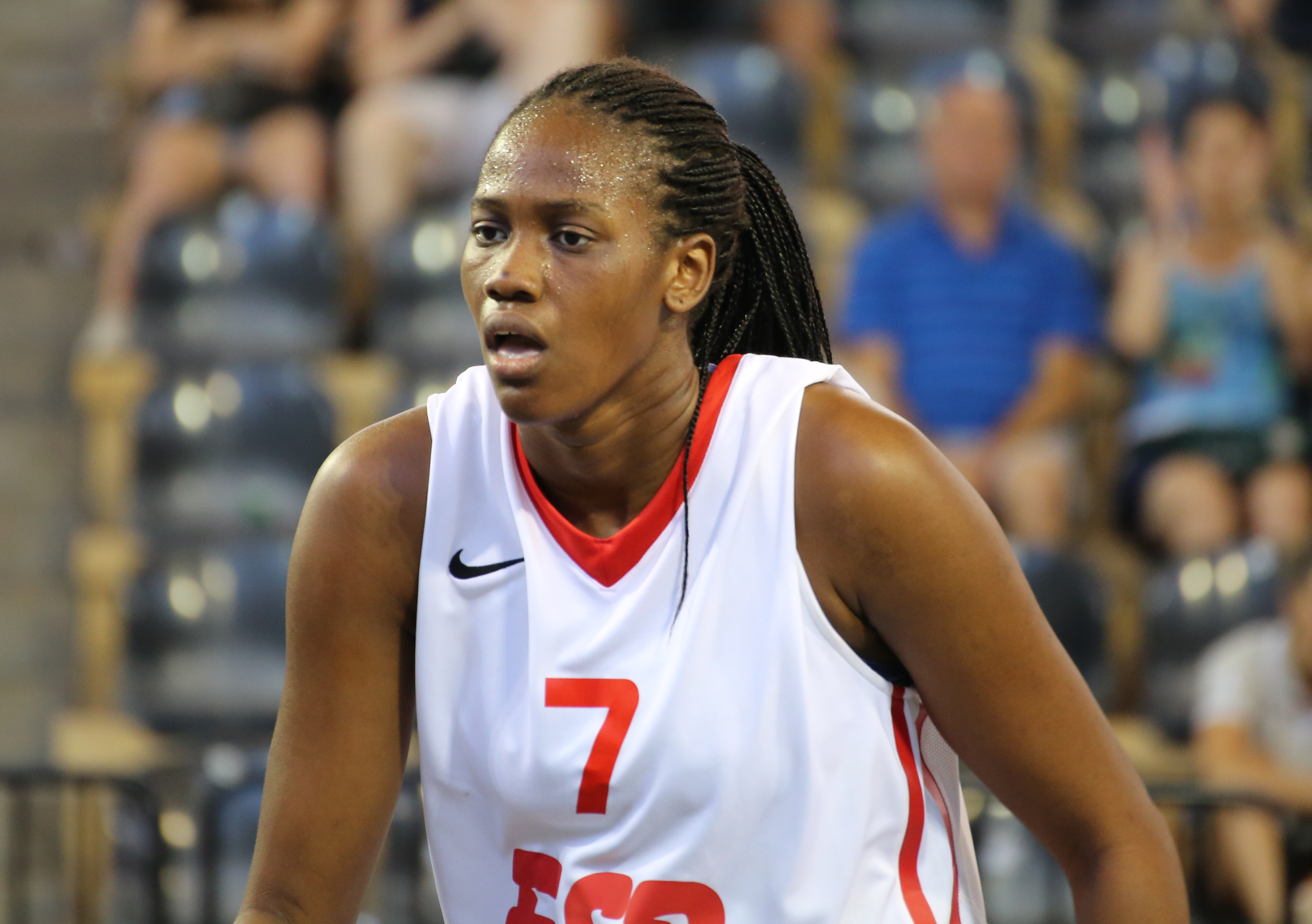

Gernika KESB
- Position: Center
- League: Spanish League

Personal information
- Born: 23 August 1996 (age 30) Palma de Mallorca, Spain
- Listed height: 6 ft 3 in (1.91 m)

Career information
- Playing career: 2013–present

Career history
- 2013–2014: Celta de Vigo (LF2)
- 2014–2015: CB Andratx (LF2)
- 2015–2016: Mann Filter
- 2016–2018: Cadì La Seu
- 2018–2019: Quesos El Pastor
- 2019–present: Gernika KESB
Medals
Representing Spain
Mediterranean Games
Silver medal – second place	2018 Tarragona	Team 3x3

Nogaye Lo Sylla (born 23 August 1996) is a Spanish basketball player from Mallorca who plays for Lointek Gernika Bizkaia and the Spanish national team. She is considered one of the most promising centers of Spanish basketball.

== Club career ==
Born to Senegalese parents, Lo started playing basketball at Sant José Obrero school and then in IES CTEIB high school in native Palma de Mallorca. She started playing professionally at Celta de Vigo Baloncesto in 2013 and CB Antratx the following season, both in Spanish second-tier league. In 2015 she started playing in the first tier league when she signed for Mann Filter Zaragoza. The next two seasons she played for Cadì La Seu. In June 2018 she signed for Quesos El Pastor. In 2019 she signed for Lointek Gernika Bizkaia.

=== EuroCup statistics ===
Season	Team	GP	MPP	PPP	RPP	APP
2019–20 EuroCup	(Spain) Lointek Gernika Bizkaia	11	20.4	8.5	3.7	1.0

== National team ==
Lo started playing with Spain's youth teams at 15, winning a total of five medals from 2012 to 2016. She made her debut with the senior team in 2016, when she was 19 years old.

- 2012 FIBA Europe Under-16 Championship (youth)
- 2012 FIBA Under-17 World Championship (youth)
- 2013 FIBA Europe Under-18 Championship (youth)
- 2015 FIBA Europe Under-20 Championship (youth)
- 4th 2015 FIBA Under-19 World Championship (youth)
- 2016 FIBA Europe Under-20 Championship (youth)
