= La Vegueta =

Human settlement in the Canary Islands, Spain

Coordinates: 29°03′N 13°39′W

La Vegueta is a village in Tinajo, Las Palmas province of western Lanzarote in the Canary Islands, Spain.
