= Leticia Romero =

Spanish basketball player (born 1995)

No. 10 – Valencia Basket
- Position: Guard
- League: LFB

Personal information
- Born: 28 May 1995 (age 31) Agüimes, Canary Islands, Spain
- Listed height: 5 ft 8 in (1.73 m)

Career information
- High school: I.E.S. Joaquín Artiles
- College: Kansas State (2013–2014); Florida State (2014–2017)
- WNBA draft: 2017: 2nd round, 16th overall pick
- Drafted by: Connecticut Sun
- Playing career: 2010–present

Career history
- 2010–2013: CB Islas Canarias
- 2017–2019: ZVVZ USK Praha
- 2018: Dallas Wings
- 2019-present: Valencia Basket

Career highlights
- Czech League champion (2018); EuroCup champion (2021); Second-team All-Big 12 (2014); Second-team All-ACC (2015); Big 12 All-Freshman team (2014)
- Stats at Basketball Reference

Leticia Romero González (born 28 May 1995) is a Spanish basketball player from Agüimes who plays for Valencia Basket and the Spain women's national basketball team. She played three years in the Spain's top-tier league before spending her U.S. college career with Kansas State and Florida State. She played the 2018 WNBA season with the Dallas Wings.

== Club career ==
Romero started playing basketball in local clubs from the CB Agüimes, Baloncesto Telde and CB Islas Canarias, where she made her debut in the Spanish top-tier league in 2010, at only 15. She spent three seasons in the senior team, averaging 8.4 PPG. In her last season in the club (2012-13) she averaged 14.9 PPG, 3.6 RPG and 3.5 APG before turning 18 years old. In the 2011 and 2012 seasons she played a total of 16 games in Europe's second tier tournament, the EuroCup.

=== U.S. college career ===
Romero, a native of the Canary Islands, was widely sought after by major U.S. college programs going into the 2013–14 season, ultimately choosing to play at Kansas State largely because of her rapport with the coaching staff. At the time, she was not fully comfortable with English, and according to ESPN journalist M.A. Voepel, was "seeking a place she would feel taken care of and safe". While the Wildcats only finished 11–19 in her freshman season, she enjoyed considerable personal success, averaging 14.2 points, 5.8 rebounds, and 5.0 assists per game on her way to being named unanimously to the Big 12 Conference all-freshman team and also earning second-team All-Big 12 honors.

Shortly after Romero received a release, she received a call from Sue Semrau, head coach at Florida State, one of the schools she had visited during her original recruitment. The two quickly reconnected, and as Romero considered her options, she found herself drawn to the Seminoles' style of play and willing to meet the expectations Semrau was setting for the program. She then enrolled at FSU, initially planning to sit out the 2014–15 season due to NCAA transfer regulations.

Given the situation surrounding Romero's transfer from Kansas State, Florida State petitioned the NCAA for a waiver to allow her to play after the end of Kansas State's 2014 fall academic term. Semrau had told Romero that the chances of a successful petition were low. Since Romero could not travel with the team as a redshirting transfer, she went to her home of Las Palmas for a short Christmas break. During that time, the NCAA granted the petition, allowing her to immediately play for the Seminoles.

Despite missing the first 13 games of the 2014–15 season, she was second on the team in assists, also averaging 10.1 points and 5.3 rebounds in the regular season while being named to the all-Atlantic Coast Conference second team.

==== College statistics ====
Legend
GP	Games played	GS	Games started	MPG	Minutes per game
FG%	Field goal percentage	3P%	3-point field goal percentage	FT%	Free throw percentage
RPG	Rebounds per game	APG	Assists per game	SPG	Steals per game
BPG	Blocks per game	PPG	Points per game	**Bold**	Career high

Year	Team	GP	Points	FG%	3P%	FT%	RPG	APG	SPG	BPG	PPG
2013-14	Kansas State	30	427	41.9%	39.2%	77.3%	**5.8**	5.0	**1.9**	0.2	**14.2**
2014-15	Florida State	24	264	**54.1%**	45.0%	77.4%	5.3	**5.3**	1.2	0.2	11.0
2015-16	Florida State	30	348	43.9%	44.7%	83.3%	4.2	4.6	1.3	0.2	11.6
2016-17	Florida State	**33**	414	48.6%	**50.9%**	**88.9%**	4.0	3.7	1.4	**0.4**	12.5
Career		117	1453	46.2%	45.2%	81.3%	4.8	4.6	1.5	0.3	12.4

=== WNBA ===
Romero was selected as the fourth pick of the second round (16th pick overall) of the 2017 WNBA draft by the Connecticut Sun.

In June 2018 Romero was signed by the Dallas Wings.

=== Back in Europe ===
After four successful formative years in the NCAA and graduating from Florida State University, Romero signed for Czech club ZVVZ USK Praha for the 2017–18 season, winning the 2018 Czech League. In 2019, she signed for Spanish team Valencia Basket.

=== EuroLeague and EuroCup stats ===
EuroCup winner

Season	Team	GP	MPP	PPP	RPP	APP
2010-11 EuroCup	(Spain) CB Islas Canarias	6	13.0	2.0	1.3	1.5
2011-12 EuroCup	(Spain) CB Islas Canarias	10	30.7	6.0	2.7	2.5
2017-18 EuroLeague	(Czech Republic) ZVVZ USK Praha	16	17.3	4.2	2.6	2.7
2018-19 EuroLeague	(Czech Republic) ZVVZ USK Praha	17	13.3	2.9	1.2	1.8
2019-20 EuroCup	(Spain) Valencia Basket	4	20.0	8.5	2.8	2.8
2020-21 EuroCup	(Spain) Valencia Basket	7	19.4	6.6	2.4	3.0
2021-22 EuroCup	(Spain) Valencia Basket					

== WNBA career statistics ==
Legend
GP	Games played	GS	Games started	MPG	Minutes per game	RPG	Rebounds per game
APG	Assists per game	SPG	Steals per game	BPG	Blocks per game	PPG	Points per game
TO	Turnovers per game	FG%	Field-goal percentage	3P%	3-point field-goal percentage	FT%	Free-throw percentage
**Bold**	Career best	°	League leader

=== Regular season ===
Year	Team	GP	GS	MPG	FG%	3P%	FT%	RPG	APG	SPG	BPG	TO	PPG
2018	Dallas	21	0	7.0	.313	.200	.867	0.8	1.1	0.0	0.0	0.7	1.1
Career	1 year, 1 team	21	0	7.0	.313	.200	.867	0.8	1.1	0.0	0.0	0.7	1.1

=== Playoffs ===
Year	Team	GP	GS	MPG	FG%	3P%	FT%	RPG	APG	SPG	BPG	TO	PPG
2018	Dallas	1	0	2.0	.000	.000	1.000	0.0	0.0	0.0	0.0	0.0	2.0
Career	1 year, 1 team	1	0	2.0	.000	.000	1.000	0.0	0.0	0.0	0.0	0.0	2.0

== National team ==
Romero started playing with Spain's youth teams at 15, winning a total of five medals from 2010 to 2015. She made her debut with the senior team in 2014, when she was 19 years old. Up to 2017, she had 58 caps with 2.6 PPG, participating in the Rio 2016 Olympics, one World Championships and two EuroBaskets:

- 5th 2010 FIBA Europe Under-16 Championship (youth)
- 2011 FIBA Europe Under-16 Championship (youth)
- 5th 2012 FIBA Europe Under-18 Championship (youth)
- 2012 FIBA Under-17 World Championship (youth)
- 4th 2013 FIBA Under-19 World Championship (youth)
- 2013 FIBA Europe Under-18 Championship (youth)
- 2014 FIBA Europe Under-20 Championship (youth)
- 2015 FIBA Europe Under-20 Championship (youth)
- 2014 World Championship
- 2015 Eurobasket
- 2016 Summer Olympics
- 2017 Eurobasket
