= La Santa, Lanzarote =

Coordinates: 29.108°N 13.666°W

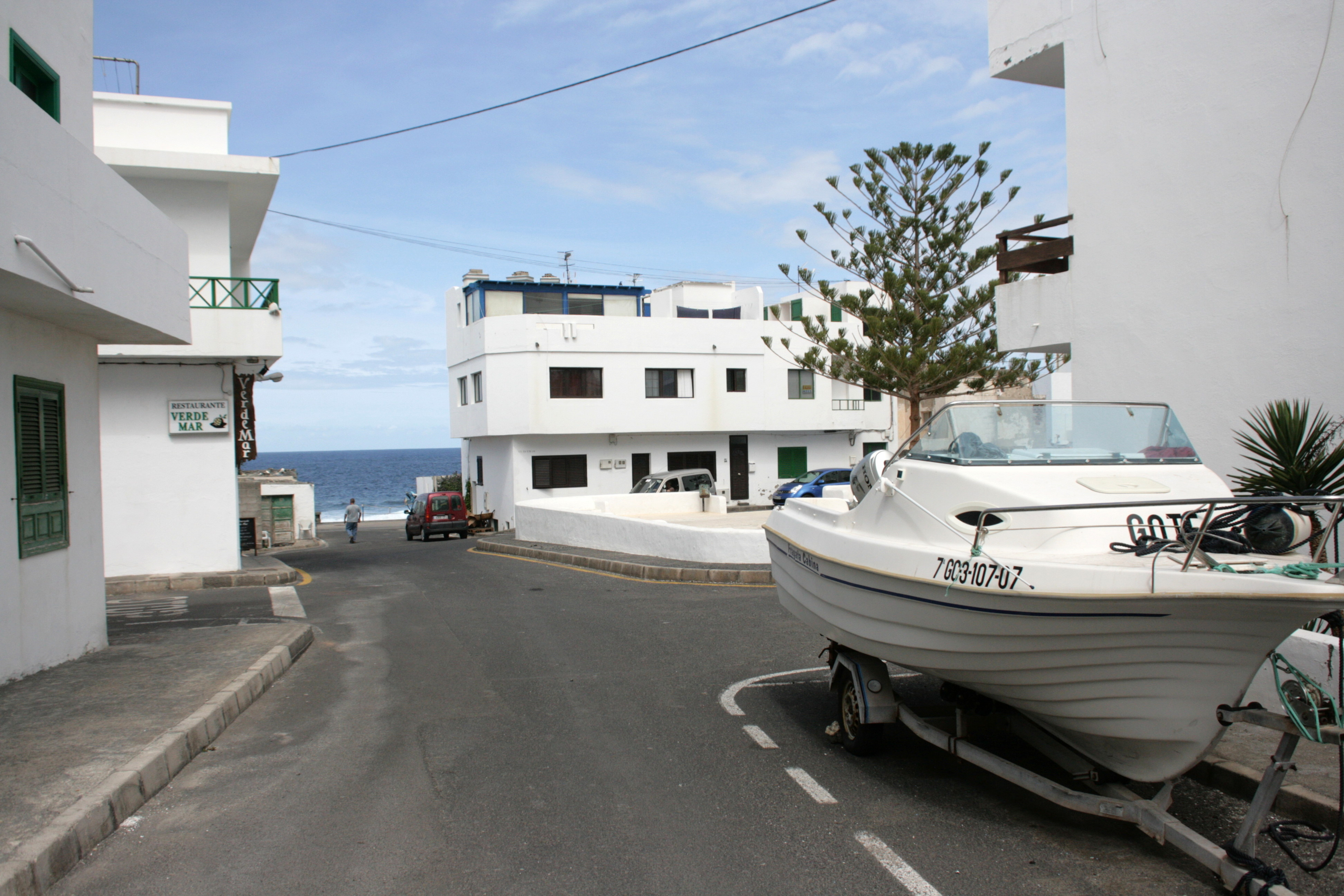
A place in La Santa

La Santa is a village in Tinajo, Las Palmas province of western Lanzarote in the Canary Islands. The village has a small harbor and is a popular spot for water sports.
