= Laura Cornelius =

Dutch basketball player (born 1996)

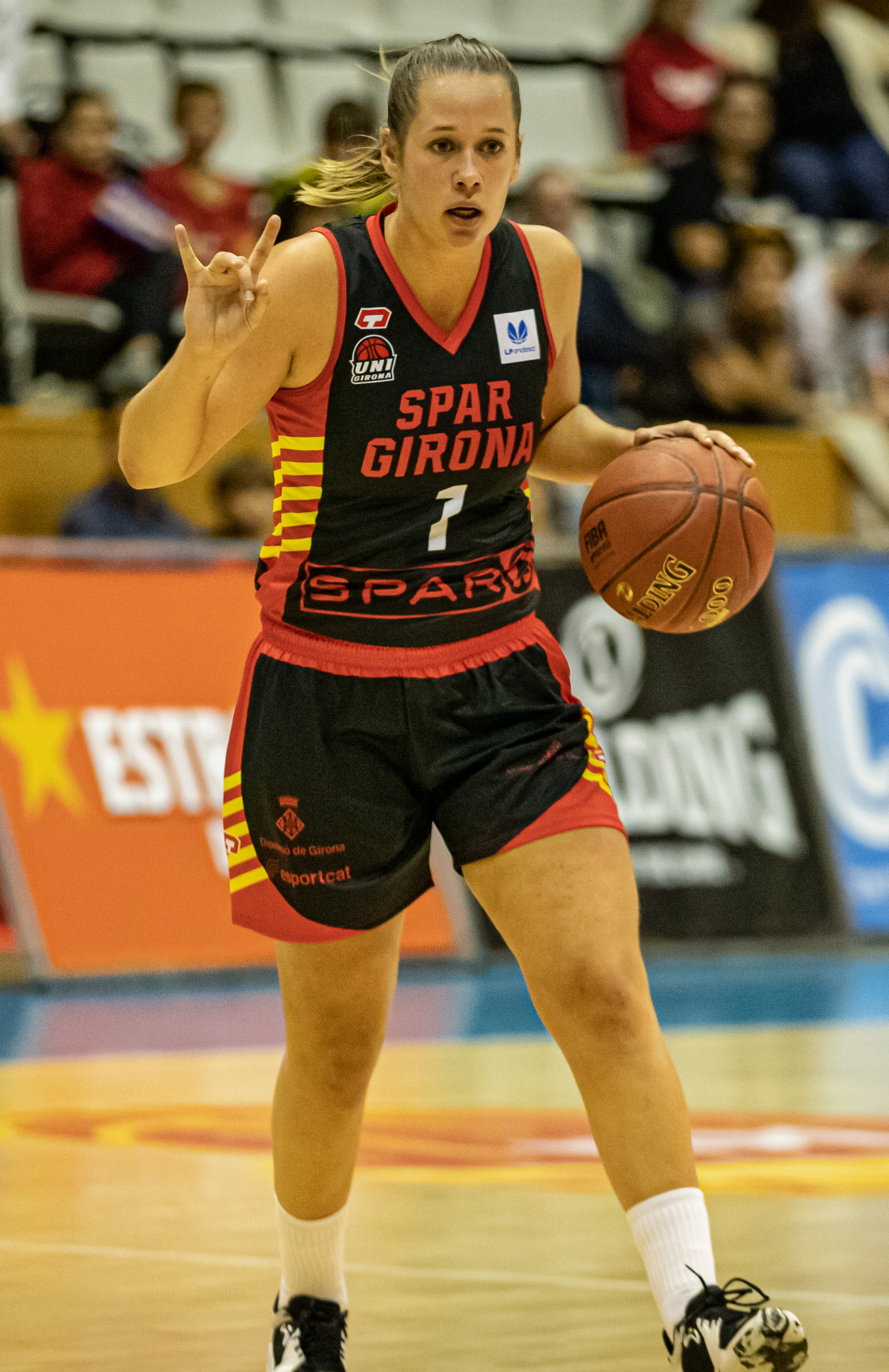
- Cornelius - Semifinal 34th Catalan League AON 2022 Women

Personal information
- Born: 8 February 1996 (age 30) Groningen, Netherlands
- Listed height: 1.73 m (5 ft 8 in)
- Position: Point guard

Laura Cornelius (born 8 February 1996) is a Dutch professional basketball player. She currently plays for Çukurova Basketbol of the Turkish Women's Basketball League. Cornelius has captained the Netherlands women's national basketball team. She plays as point guard and is 1.73 m (5 ft 8 in) tall.

== Early life ==
Born in Groningen, Cornelius played for the amateur club Celeritas-Donar. When she was 12 years old, she already played in the club's under-20 team and was described by her coach as the "potentially biggest talent in Dutch basketball". Cornelius later played for CTO Amsterdam in the Women's Basketball League, the national top-flight league. She was named the Rookie of the Year of the 2012–13 season, after averaging 12 points, 4.3 rebounds and 4 assists.

== College career ==
In 2014, Cornelius was supposed to play collegiate basketball for Gonzaga University, however, a knee injury forced her to abandon the plans.

Cornelius played for the Miami Hurricanes women's basketball from 2015 to 2018. She had also received offers from Duke, Gonzaga, Iowa State and Kansas State. In her junior year, Cornelius was the Hurricanes' co-captain, while she was forced to redshirt the season due to a leg injury.

== Professional career ==
From 2019 to 2023, Cornelius played in Spain for several teams, including CD Zamarat (2019–2020), Gernika KESB (2020–2021), IDK Euskotren (2021–2022) and CB Girona (2022–2023).

In January 2023, Turkish side Çukurova Basketbol contacted Girona and offered the club a transfer fee, which eventually led to her transfer to Turkey. In the remainder of the 2022–23 season, the team finished as runners-up in the 2022-23 EuroLeague Women.

== National team career ==
At the junior level, Cornelius won a bronze medal at the 2015 FIBA Europe Under-20 Championship for Women.
