= Tinajo (place) =

Place in Lanzarote

Coordinates: 29°4′0.29″N 13°40′36.09″W

Tinajo is a place in the municipality with the same name Tinajo in the western portion of the island of Lanzarote in the Las Palmas province in the Canary Islands. The population is 2,809 (2007).

== Traffic and transportation ==
The village is reachable by the roads LZ-67 and LZ-20.
