= Veronika Remenárová =

Slovak basketball player

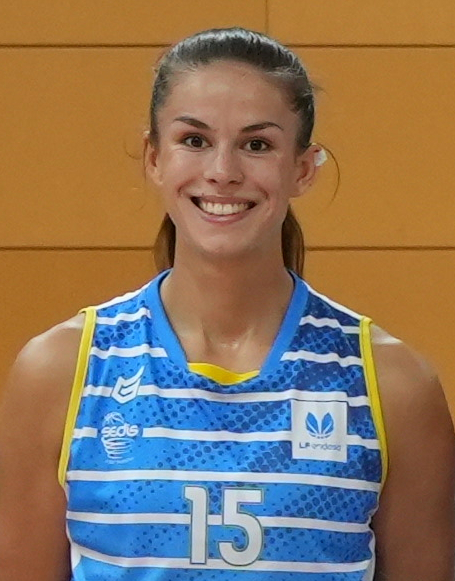

No. 5 – Rutronik Stars Keltern
- Position: Small forward
- League: 1. Damen-Basketball-Bundesliga

Personal information
- Born: March 16, 1997 (age 29) Ružomberok, Slovakia
- Listed height: 6 ft 1 in (1.85 m)

Career information
- Playing career: 2012–present

Career history
- 2022-present: Rutronik Stars Keltern

Veronika Remenárová (born March 16, 1997) is a Slovak basketball player.

She has played for Valosun Brno and the Slovak national team.

She participated at the EuroBasket Women 2017.
