= El Cuchillo =

Coordinates: 29°05′N 13°40′W

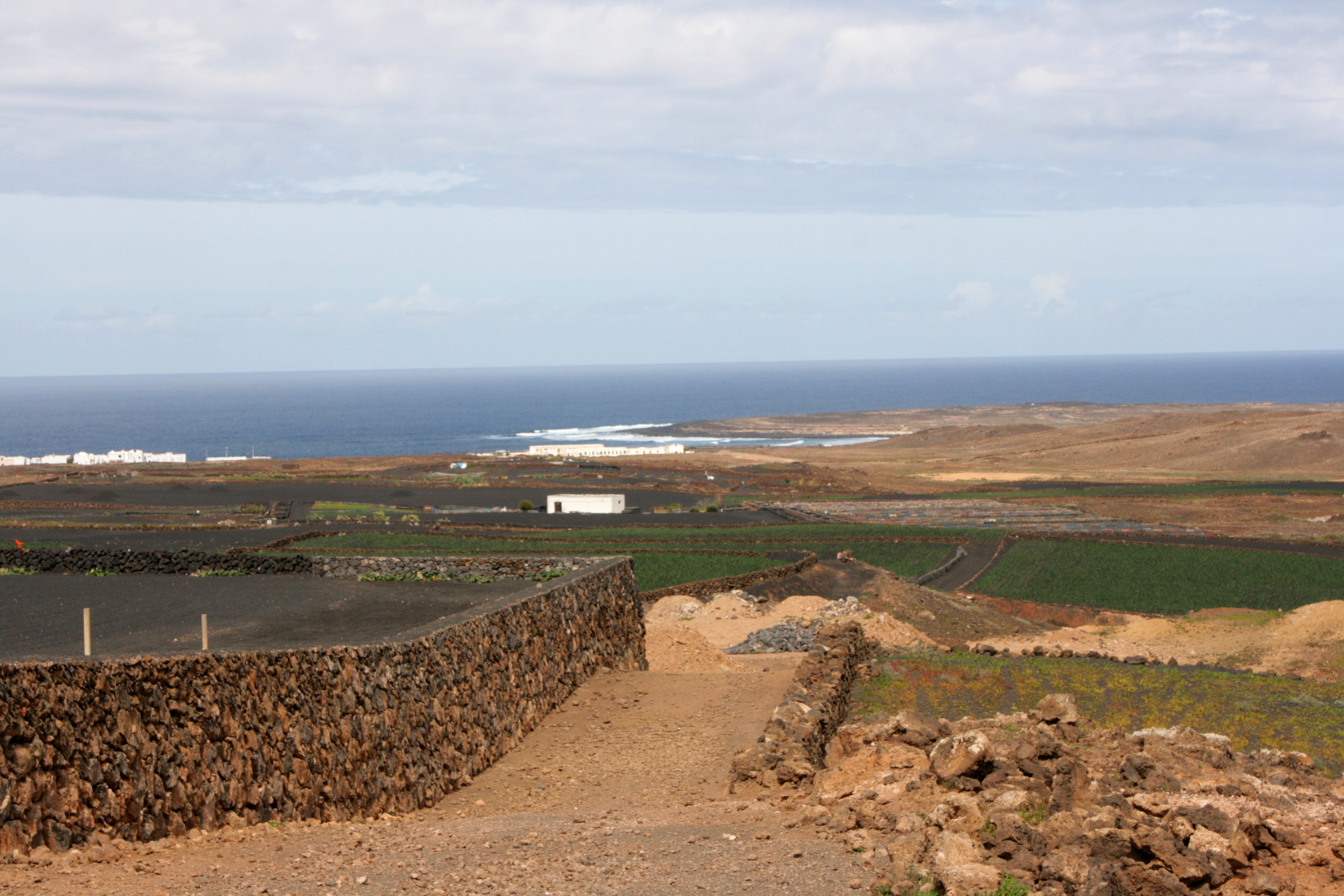
View from El Cuchillo down to La Santa in Tinajo, Lanzarote, Canary Islands

El Cuchillo is a village in Tinajo, Las Palmas province of western Lanzarote in the Canary Islands.

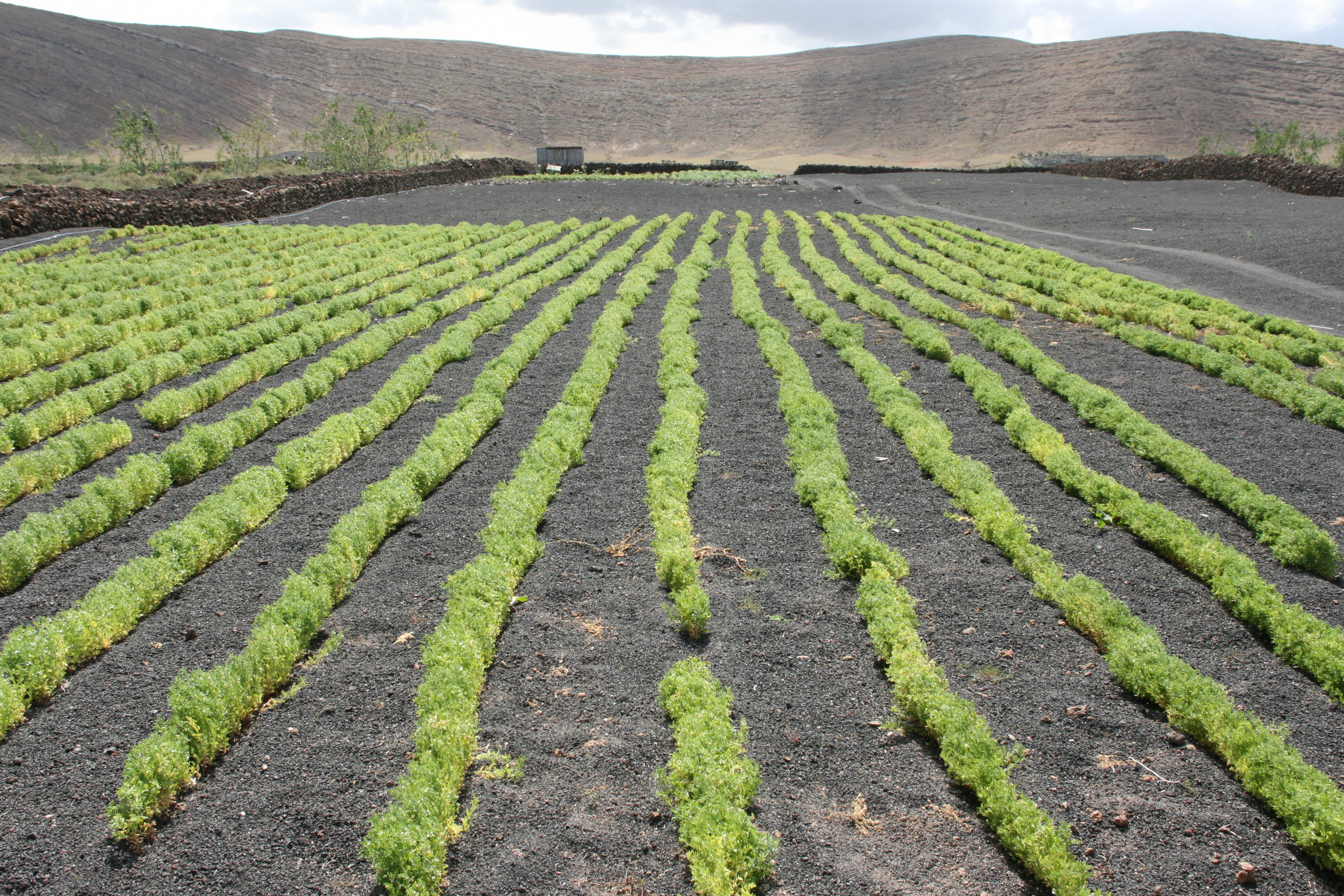
Agricultural fields in the Caldera de Cuchillo

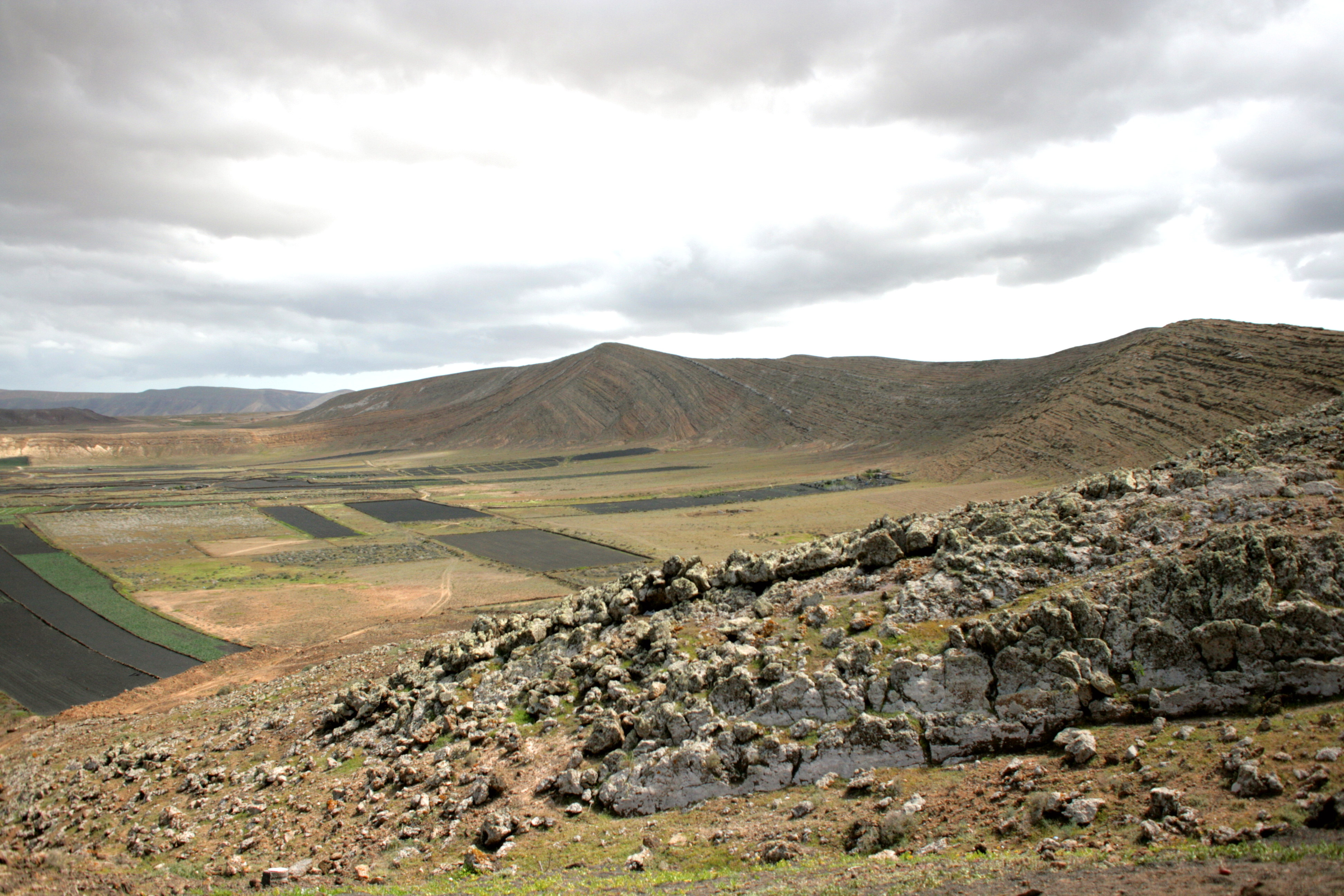
Caldera de Cuchillo

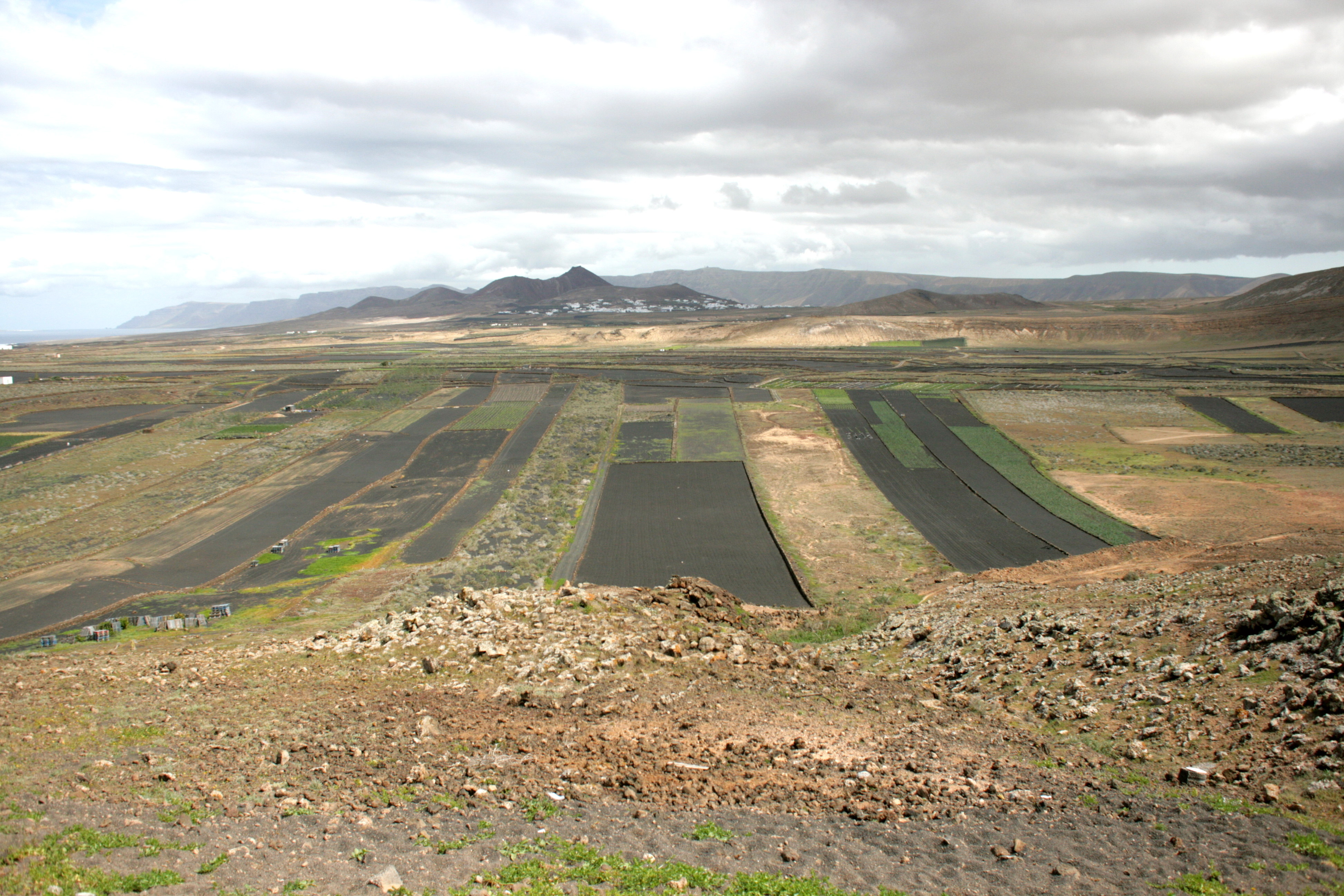
