= Alina Hartmann =

German basketball player

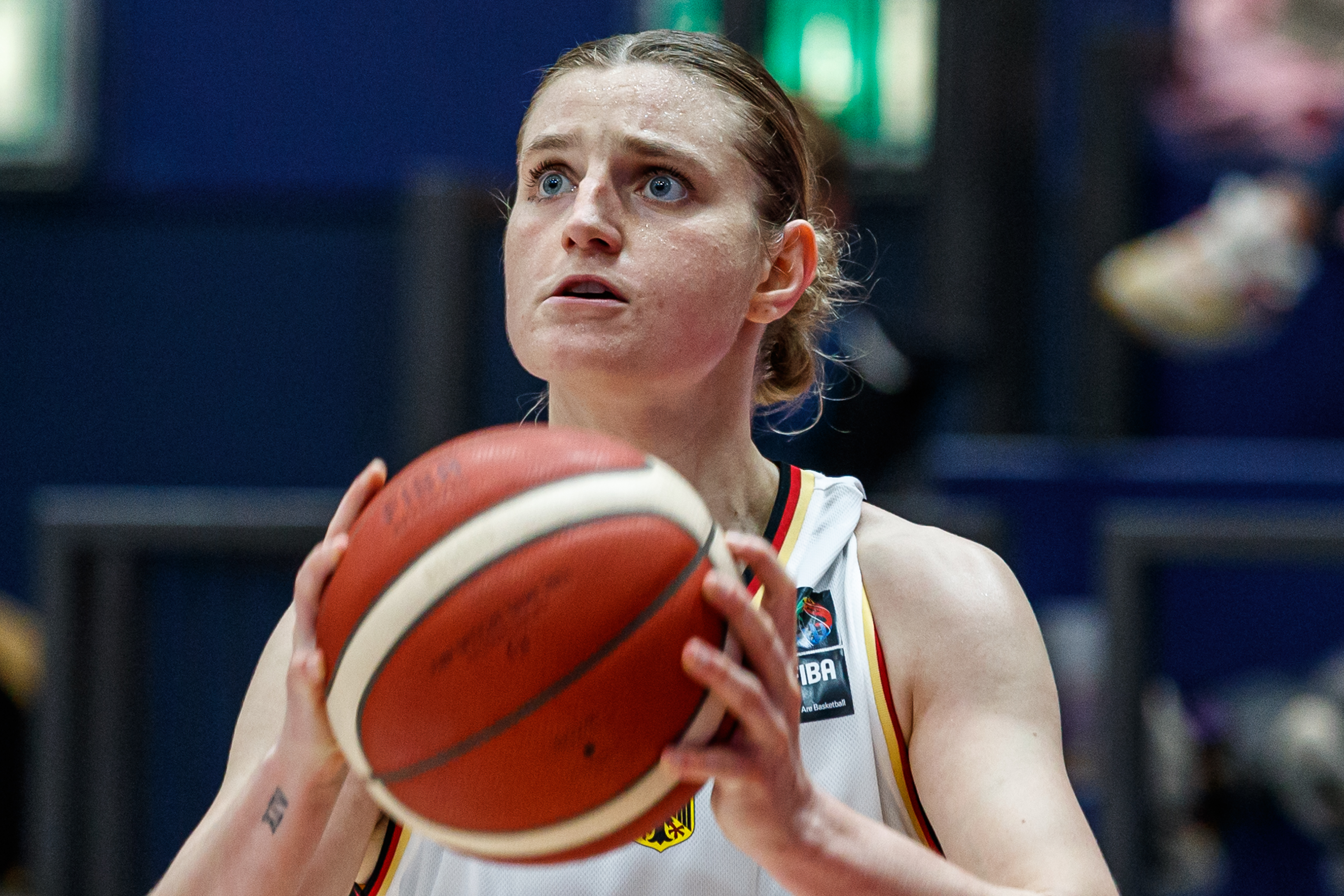
- Hartmann 2022 in Germany

Personal information
- Born: 23 October 1995 (age 31) Bamberg, Germany
- Listed height: 6 ft 0 in (1.83 m)

Career information
- High school: Kaiser-Heinrich-Gymnasium Bamberg
- College: Colorado (2014–2015)
- Playing career: 2013–present
- Position: Guard/Forward

Career history
- 2013–2014: DJK Don Bosco Bamberg
- 2015-2017: SV Halle
- 2017-2018: Fireballs Bad Aibling
- 2018-2019: TSV Wasserburg
- 2019: Cockburn Cougars
- 2019-2020: Mataro Parc

Alina Hartmann (born 23 October 1995) is a German basketball player, currently playing for Mataro Parc in Spain.

== Career ==
Hartmann was born in Bamberg. The 1.83 m tall athlete played for the Bundesliga team DJK Don Bosco Bamberg until 2014 and was considered a great talent in German women's basketball. This was also expressed by the fact that she was appointed to the DBB's U-16 team and that she made her debut as a 17-year-old in the senior national team with national coach Alexandra Maerz. In her second international A game, she scored her first seven points in the national jersey in a clash with Finland.

After the DJK Brose Bamberg relegated from the 1st Bundesliga in the 2013/2014 season (in that season Hartmann achieved the best average of their Bamberg Bundesliga time with 9.8 points per game played), she moved to Boulder to join the American college team Colorado Buffaloes of the University of Colorado Boulder. As, like Hartmann later described, her time at the college felt like a "military drill", she returned to Germany in the season of 2015/16 and joined the Bundesliga club SV Halle. After two years in Halle, she changed to TuS Bad Aibling (also Bundesliga) during the summer break of 2017. After having played for both TSV Wasserburg and the Australian Cockburn Cougars in the 2018-2019 season, she eventually changed to Mataro Parc for the 2019-2020 season.
