= Cuchillo-Có =

Coordinates: 38°20′S 64°37′W

- Rural locality and village
- Interactive map of Cuchillo-Có
- Country: Argentina
- Province: La Pampa Province
- Time zone: UTC−3 (ART)

Cuchillo-Có is a village and rural locality (municipality) in La Pampa Province in Argentina.
