= Olga Yatskovets =

Ukrainian basketball player

No. 23 – BC Avanhard Kyiv
- Position: Power forward
- League: UBSL

Personal information
- Born: October 16, 1997 (age 27); Berdiansk, Ukraine
- Listed height: 6 ft 2 in (1.88 m)

Olga Yatskovets (born October 16, 1997) is a Ukrainian basketball player for BC Avanhard Kyiv and the Ukrainian national team.

She participated at the EuroBasket Women 2017.
