= Tinajo (municipality) =

- Municipality
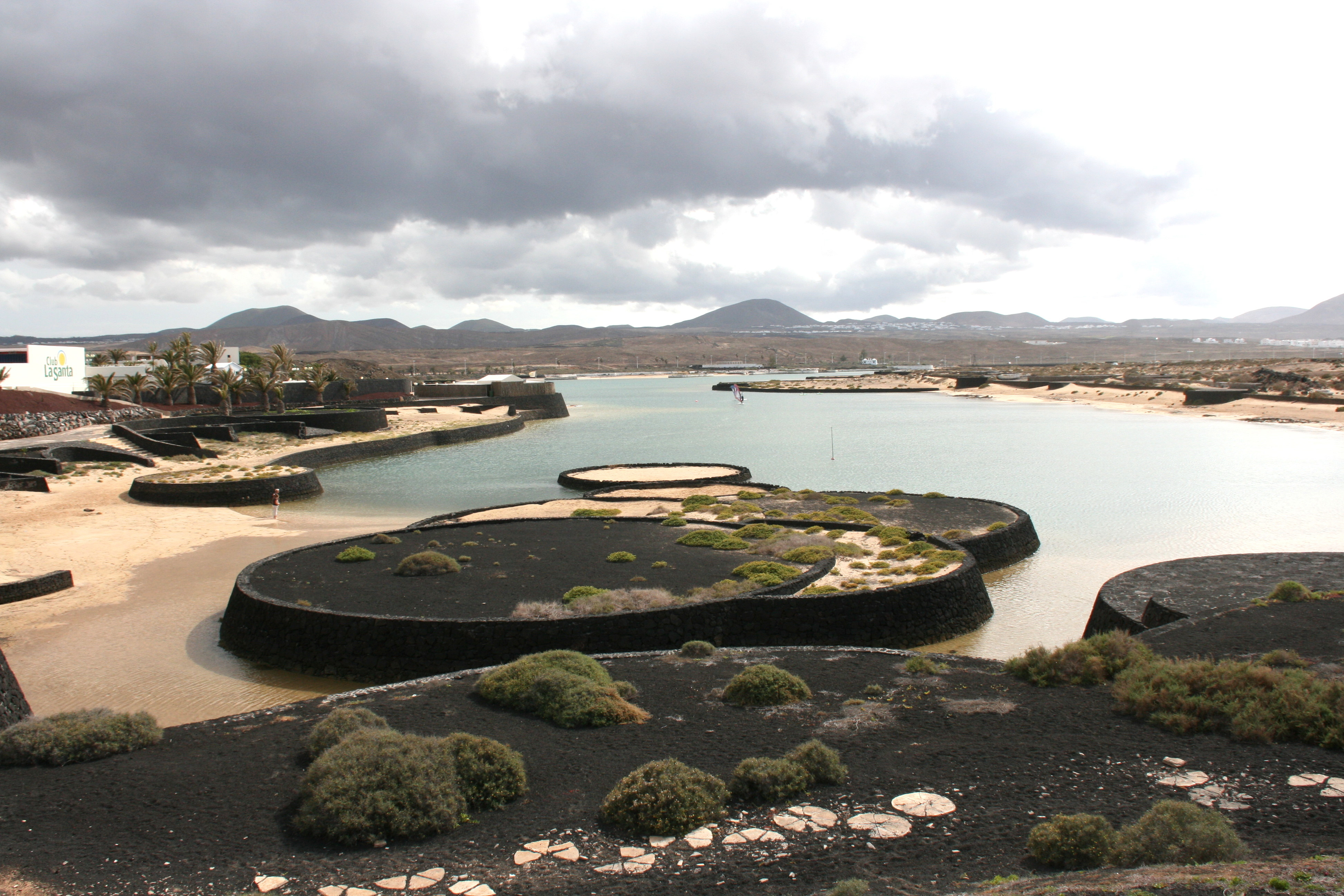
- Former desalination lagoon in Tinajo

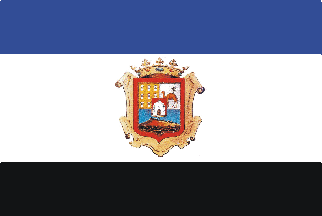
- Flag Coat of arms

- Municipal location in Lanzarote

- Location in the province of Las Palmas Tinajo (Canary Islands) Tinajo (Spain, Canary Islands)
- Coordinates: 29°4′N 13°40′W
- Country: Spain
- Autonomous community: Canary Islands
- Province: Las Palmas
- Island: Lanzarote

Government
  - Mayor: Jesús Casimiro Machín Duque (CC)

Area
  - Total: 135.28 km^{2} (52.23 sq mi)

Population (2025-01-01)
  - Total: 6,939
  - Density: 51.29/km^{2} (132.8/sq mi)
- Time zone: UTC±0 (WET)
  - Summer (DST): UTC+1 (WEST)
- Postal code: 35530
- Website: tinajo.es

Tinajo is a municipality in the western part of the island of Lanzarote in the Province of Las Palmas in the Canary Islands, Spain. The population is 6119 (2018), and the area is 135.28 square kilometres (52.23 sq mi). The municipality is located on the island's northwestern coast and is northwest of the island's capital, Arrecife. The main town in the municipality is Tinajo.

== Historical population ==
Historical population

Year	Pop.	±% p.a.
1996	3,755	—
2000	4,373	+3.88%
2005	5,258	+3.75%

Year	Pop.	±% p.a.
2010	5,655	+1.47%
2015	5,824	+0.59%
2018	6,119	+1.66%

Source: Centro de Datos, Cabildo de Lanzarote

== Settlements ==
The following settlements are located within the municipality of Tinajo:

- El Cuchillo
- Mancha Blanca
- La Santa
- Tinajo
- La Vegueta

== Sites of interest ==
The Timanfaya National Park (created in 1974) covers the southwestern part of the municipality and is where most of its volcanoes are located. The park features volcanoes and rugged lands. The rest of the park is in the municipality of Yaiza.

The chapel of Our Lady of Dolours (Virgen de los Dolores), the patron saint of the island of Lanzarote, is located in Mancha Blanca, within the municipality of Tinajo.

== See also ==
- List of municipalities in Las Palmas
