= Paula Strautmane =

Latvian basketball player (born 1997)

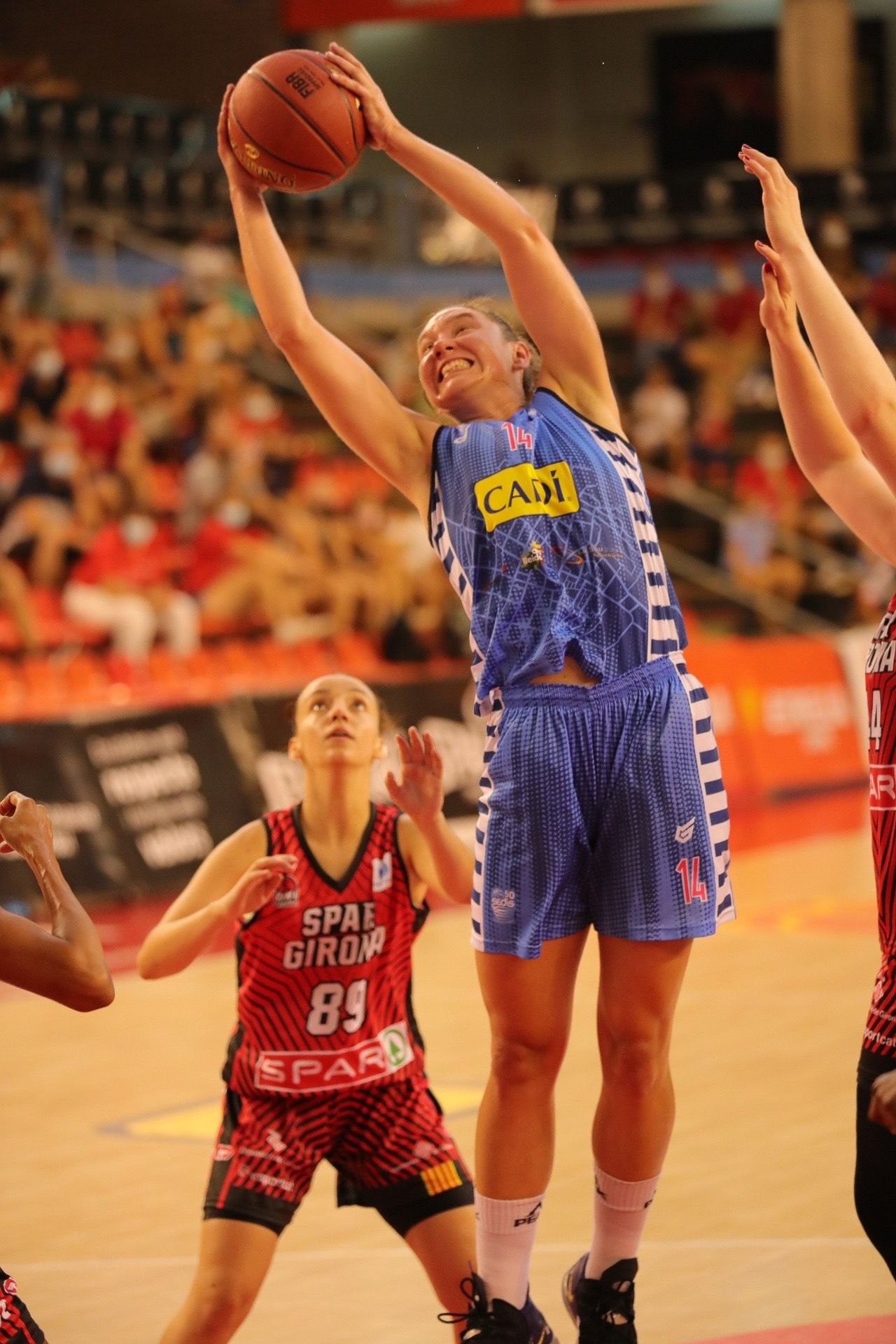

Personal information
- Born: 23 March 1997 (age 29) Riga, Latvia
- Listed height: 6 ft 1 in (1.85 m)

Career information
- College: Quinnipiac (2015–2019)
- WNBA draft: 2019: undrafted
- Position: Power forward

Career history
- 2019–2020: TTT Riga
- 2020–2021: PEAC-Pécs
- 2021–2023: AE Sedis Bàsquet
- 2023–present: Kangoeroes Basket Mechelen

Paula Strautmane (born 23 March 1997) is a Latvian basketball player for TTT Riga and the Latvian national team. She played college basketball for the Quinnipiac Bobcats in Hamden, Connecticut. Her younger sister Digna also is a basketball player, who played at the Syracuse and Georgia Tech in NCAA and Latvian national team.

She participated at the EuroBasket Women three times (2017 and 2019) and 2023).
