= Janice Monakana =

British basketball player

No. 12 – Sevenoaks Suns
- Position: Forward
- League: WBBL

Personal information
- Born: 6 August 1995 (age 31) Edgware, England
- Listed height: 1.82 m (6 ft 0 in)

Career information
- College: Toledo (2017)
- WNBA draft: 2017: undrafted
- Playing career: 2017––present

Career history
- 2018–present: Sevenoaks Suns

Janice Monakana (born 6 August 1995) is a British basketball player for Sevenoaks Suns and the Great Britain national team.

She represented Great Britain at the FIBA Women's EuroBasket 2019.
