= Digna Strautmane =

Latvian basketball player

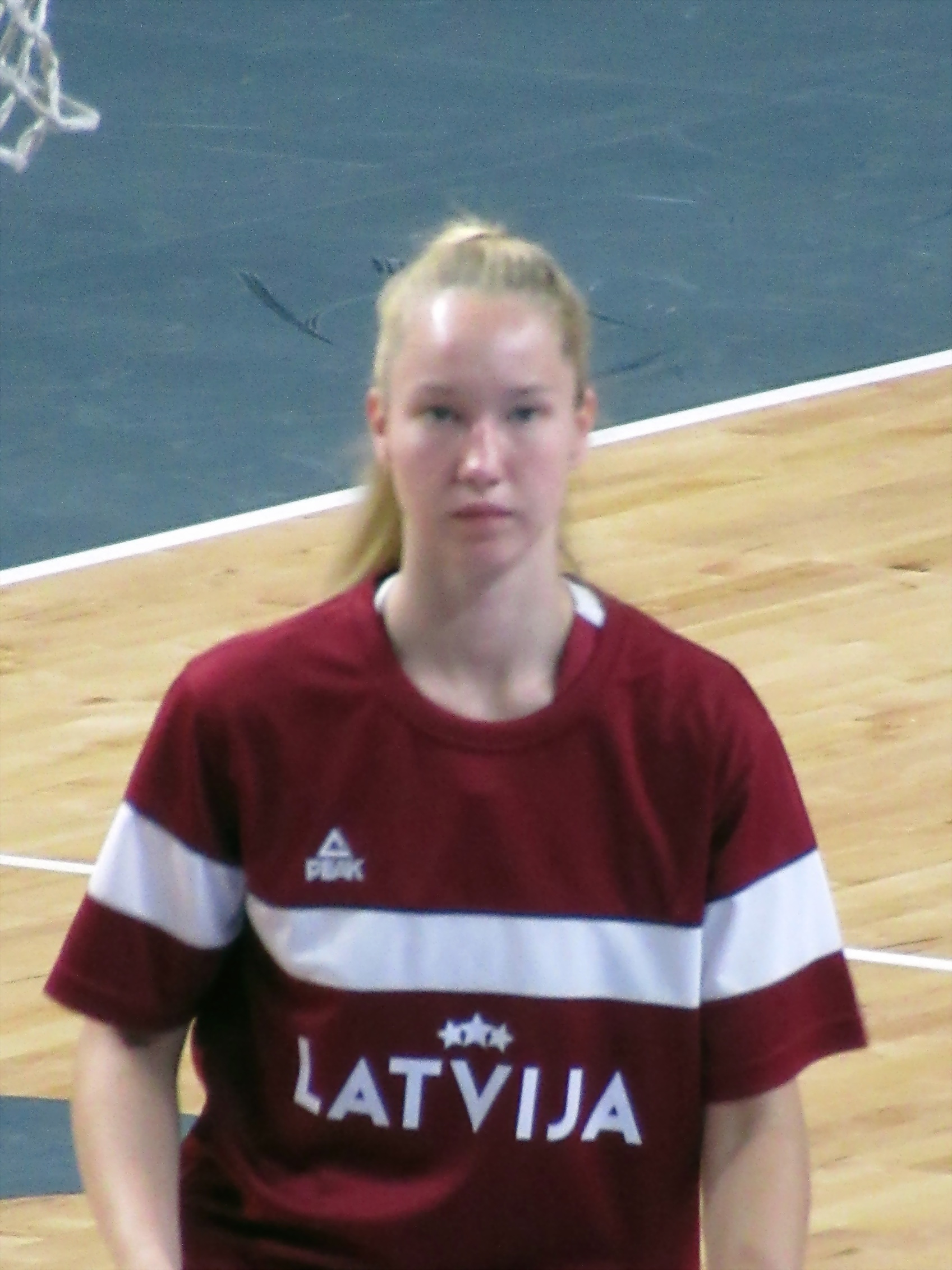
- Strautmane with the Latvian national team in 2019

Personal information
- Born: 18 September 1998 (age 27) Riga, Latvia
- Listed height: 6 ft 2 in (1.88 m)

Career information
- College: Syracuse (2017–2021); Georgia Tech (2021–2022)
- WNBA draft: 2022: undrafted
- Playing career: 2014–present
- Position: Forward

Career history
- 2014–2017: TTT Riga
- 2022: Ringwood Hawks
- 2022: Olympiacos
- 2023–2025: 1KS Sleza
- 2024: Ringwood Hawks

Career highlights
- NBL1 South champion (2022); NBL1 South Defensive Player of the Year (2022); 3× Latvian League champion (2015–2017); EWBL champion (2016); ACC All-Freshman Team (2018)

Digna Strautmane (born 18 September 1998) is a Latvian professional basketball player. She played college basketball for Syracuse and Georgia Tech and has played for the Latvian national team.

== Early life and career ==
Strautmane was born in Riga, Latvia. She played in the junior Latvian leagues before debuting for TTT Riga of the Latvian NBL in the 2014–15 season. She played three seasons for TTT Riga.

== College career ==
Strautmane played college basketball in the United States with the first four years being with Syracuse from 2017 to 2021 and the final season being with Georgia Tech in 2021–22.

== Syracuse statistics ==
Ratios
Year	Team	GP	FG%	3P%	FT%	RBG	APG	BPG	SPG	PPG
2017–18	Syracuse	31	38.8%	21.3%	69.0%	6.13	1.10	1.87	0.77	10.07
2018–19	Syracuse	34	43.3%	36.1%	77.1%	4.97	1.68	0.85	0.68	9.53
2019–20	Syracuse	31	36.3%	29.5%	85.7%	4.52	1.45	1.29	0.90	8.65
2020–21	Syracuse	24	38.8%	28.3%	90.9%	5.75	1.42	1.08	1.29	7.42
Career		120	39.4%	29.0%	77.1%	5.31	1.42	1.28	0.88	9.02

Totals
Year	Team	GP	FG	FGA	3P	3PA	FT	FTA	REB	A	BK	ST	PTS
2017–18	Syracuse	31	127	327	29	136	29	42	190	34	58	24	312
2018–19	Syracuse	34	122	282	53	147	27	35	169	57	29	23	324
2019–20	Syracuse	31	98	270	54	183	18	21	140	45	40	28	268
2020–21	Syracuse	24	69	178	30	106	10	11	138	34	26	31	178
Career		120	416	1057	166	572	84	109	637	170	153	106	1082

== Professional career ==
Strautmane made her professional debut in Australia for the Ringwood Hawks of the NBL1 South during the 2022 season. She was named NBL1 South Defensive Player of the Year and helped the Hawks win the NBL1 South championship.

Strautmane joined Olympiacos in Greece for the 2022–23 season, but left in November 2022.

For the 2023–24 season, Strautmane joined 1KS Sleza of the Polish League. She then returned to the Ringwood Hawks for the 2024 NBL1 South season. She returned to 1KS Sleza for the 2024–25 season.

== National team ==
Strautmane played for Latvia at the 2018 FIBA Women's Basketball World Cup.
