= Laura Ferreira =

Portuguese physiotherapist (1965–2020)

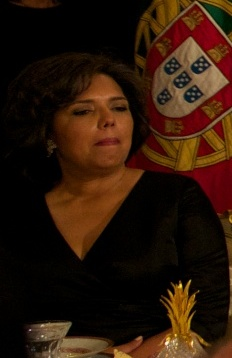
- Born: Laura Maria Garcês Ferreira; 27 September 1965; Guinea-Bissau
- Died: 25 February 2020 (aged 54); Lisbon, Portugal
- Occupation: Physiotherapist
- Known for: Wife of Portuguese prime minister Pedro Passos Coelho

Laura Ferreira (27 September 1965 – 25 February 2020) was a Portuguese physiotherapist. She was the second wife of Pedro Passos Coelho, former prime minister of Portugal.

== Early life ==
Laura Maria Garcês Ferreira was born in what was then the Portuguese colony of Portuguese Guinea (now the sovereign country of Guinea-Bissau) on 27 September 1965, the daughter of Tomás Ferreira, a civil servant who had a Portuguese father and a mother from Portuguese Cape Verde (now the sovereign country of Cape Verde), and Domitília Garcês, who had a Portuguese father and a mother from Portuguese Guinea. They lived in the town of Canchungo. After the Carnation Revolution of 25 April 1974, a military coup in Lisbon which overthrew Portugal's Estado Novo dictatorship and would grant independence to the Portuguese territories in Africa shortly after, her parents moved to Cape Verde, living in the city of Mindelo for a while, where Ferreira went to school. In 1978 the family moved to Portugal, living first in Coimbra and then in Cacém near the capital, Lisbon. As a college student, she first studied medicine at the University of Lisbon and then switched courses, being ultimately awarded a degree in physiotherapy which led her to follow a professional career as physiotherapist.

== Career ==
In the early 2000s, she joined the Education Centre for Disabled Citizens in Mira-Sintra, a non-profit social cooperative, and later acted as coordinator of the Rehabilitation Medicine Centre.

== Personal life ==
In 2004 she married Pedro Passos Coelho, who became the prime minister of Portugal between 2011 and 2015 as leader of the liberal-conservative Social Democratic Party (PSD). They had one daughter, Julia. Ferreira also had a daughter, Teresa, from a previous marriage. In 2015 Ferreira was diagnosed as having a bone tumour. She died in hospital on 25 February 2020.

Following her marriage to Coelho she had chosen to remain a very private figure. The Portuguese news magazine, Visão, reported that in 2011 she was the most searched Portuguese person on the internet. Subsequently, she began to become more of a public figure, appearing alongside her husband on several official occasions, contributing to two biographies about him and representing him at social or charity events. However, she refused to be interviewed by newspapers and her friends also did not collaborate with journalists. This secrecy increased following her cancer diagnosis, although in 2015 she was part of the prime minister's visit to the two African countries where she spent her childhood.
