= 2011 FIBA Europe Under-20 Championship for Women =

2011 FIBA U20 Women's European Championship
10th FIBA Under-20 Women's European Basketball Championship

Tournament details
- Host country: Serbia
- Dates: 7–17 July 2011
- Teams: 16 (from 1 confederation)
- Venues: 3 (in 2 host cities)

Final positions
- Champions: Spain (2nd title)

Tournament statistics
- MVP: (Spain) Queralt Casas

Official website
- www.fibaeurope.com

The 2011 FIBA Europe Under-20 Championship for Women was the 10th edition of the FIBA Europe Under-20 Championship for Women. 16 teams participated in the competition, held in Novi Sad and Zrenjanin, Serbia, from 7 to 17 July 2011. Spain won the championship title.

== Participating teams ==
- Belarus
- France
- Germany
- Great Britain ▲ (Winners, 2010 FIBA Europe Under-20 Championship for Women Division B)
- Italy
- Latvia
- Lithuania
- Netherlands
- Poland
- Romania
- Russia
- Serbia
- Slovakia ▲ (Runners-up, 2010 FIBA Europe Under-20 Championship for Women Division B)
- Spain
- Turkey
- Ukraine

== Preliminary round ==
In this round, the sixteen teams were allocated in four groups of four teams each. The top three qualified for the Qualifying Round. The last team of each group played for the 13th–16th place in the Classification Games.

Team advance to Qualifying Round
Team competes in Classification Round

=== Group A ===
Team	Pld	W	L	PF	PA	PD	Pts	Tiebreaker
Serbia	3	2	1	236	195	+41	5	1–1 +27
Poland	3	2	1	219	181	+38	5	1–1 –2
Ukraine	3	2	1	194	191	+3	5	1–1 –25
Germany	3	0	3	167	249	−82	3	

7 July 2011
18:15

Report

Poland	86–46	Germany
Scoring by quarter: 22–8, 24–9, 14–22, 26–7
Pts: Misiuk 16; Rebs: Szczepanik 8 Asts: Zietara 8		Pts: Schaake 19; Rebs: Greinacher 4 Asts: Brunckhorst, Karic 3

SC "Slana Bara", Novi Sad
Attendance: 250
Referees: Aliaksandr Syrytsa (BLR), Radomir Vojinovic (MNE), Petar Obradovic (BIH)

7 July 2011
20:30

Report

Ukraine	51–81	Serbia
Scoring by quarter: 14–20, 13–21, 12–19, 12–21
Pts: Malashenko 19; Rebs: Malashenko 7 Asts: Maznichenko 3		Pts: Krnjić 16; Rebs: Ajduković 12; Asts: Prvulović, Čolić 2

SC "Slana Bara", Novi Sad
Attendance: 200
Referees: Milan Brziak (SVK), Paulus Van Den Heuvel (NED), Francisco Araña (ESP)

8 July 2011
16:00

Report

Germany	53–81	Ukraine
Scoring by quarter: 14–26, 17–25, 6–19, 16–11
Pts: Greinacher, Schaake 10; Rebs: Frankenberger 7 Asts: Greinacher 3		Pts: Malashenko 24; Rebs: Maznichenko 11; Asts: Iagupova 8

SC "Slana Bara", Novi Sad
Attendance: 100
Referees: Oskars Lucis (LAT), Nicolas Maestre (FRA), Snehal Bendke (IND)

8 July 2011
20:30

Report

Serbia	73–76 (OT)	Poland
Scoring by quarter: 18–19, 16–14, 15–13, 18–21, Overtime: 6–9
Pts: Krnjić 28; Rebs: Krnjić 13; Asts: five players 3		Pts: Zietara 27; Rebs: Szczepanik 10; Asts: Zietara 4

SC "Slana Bara", Novi Sad
Attendance: 700
Referees: Alessandro Martolini (ITA), Chris Dodds (SCO), Maka Kupatadze (GEO)

9 July 2011
16:00

Report

Poland	57–62	Ukraine
Scoring by quarter: 11–15, 12–21, 9–1', 25–15
Pts: Mistygacz 12; Rebs: Mistygacz 11; Asts: Kuras, Zietara 3		Pts: Maznichenko, Iagupova 16; Rebs: Malashenko, Iagupova 10; Asts: Iagupova 7

SC "Slana Bara", Novi Sad
Attendance: 100
Referees: Radomir Vojinovic (MNE), Maka Kupatadze (GEO), Nicolas Maestre (FRA)

9 July 2011
20:30

Report

Serbia	82–68	Germany
Scoring by quarter: 14–9, 22–14, 18–27, 28–18
Pts: Marković 17; Rebs: Krnjić 8 Asts: Čolić 6		Pts: Greinacher 23; Rebs: Greinacher 12; Asts: Brunckhorst 5

SC "Slana Bara", Novi Sad
Attendance: 600
Referees: Paulus Van Den Heuvel (NED), Snehal Bendke (IND), Alessandro Martolini (ITA)

=== Group B ===
Team	Pld	W	L	PF	PA	PD	Pts	Tiebreaker
Russia	3	3	0	210	158	+52	6	
Lithuania	3	2	1	207	185	+22	5	
Turkey	3	1	2	189	180	+9	4	
Romania	3	0	3	153	236	−83	3	

7 July 2011
13:45

Report

Turkey	69–52	Romania
Scoring by quarter: 18–13, 19–17, 14–14, 18–8
Pts: Yavas 20; Rebs: Ural 12; Asts: Takmaz 4		Pts: Cursaru 16; Rebs: Ursu, Craciun 6 Asts: three players 1

SC "Slana Bara", Novi Sad
Attendance: 100
Referees: Chris Dodds (SCO), Oskars Lucis (LAT), Snehal Bendke (IND)

7 July 2011
16:00

Report

Russia	67–55	Lithuania
Scoring by quarter: 9–15, 19–15, 21–13, 18–12
Pts: Medvedeva 22; Rebs: Medvedeva 10; Asts: Finogentova 4		Pts: Mazionyte 15; Rebs: Grigalauskyte 15; Asts: Okockyte 3

SC "Slana Bara", Novi Sad
Attendance: 200
Referees: Nicolas Maestre (FRA), Maka Kupatadze (GEO), Alessandro Martolini (ITA)

8 July 2011
13:45

Report

Lithuania	64–57	Turkey
Scoring by quarter: 15–15, 19–13, 18–14, 12–15
Pts: Grigalauskytė 17; Rebs: Grigalauskytė 16; Asts: Druskytė 3		Pts: Yavas 16; Rebs: Ural 10; Asts: Yavas 3

SC "Slana Bara", Novi Sad
Attendance: 100
Referees: Francisco Araña (ESP), Aliaksandr Syrytsa (BLR), Radomir Vojinovic (MNE)

8 July 2011
18:15

Report

Romania	40–79	Russia
Scoring by quarter: 9–17, 18–23, 7–22, 6–17
Pts: Cursaru 12; Rebs: Craciun 8 Asts: Ferenczi 4		Pts: Tarasova 15; Rebs: Samorodova, Tarasova 9 Asts: Nizamova 6

SC "Slana Bara", Novi Sad
Attendance: 100
Referees: Paulus Van Den Heuvel (NED), Petar Obradovic (BIH), Milan Brziak (SVK)

9 July 2011
13:45

Report

Lithuania	88–61	Romania
Scoring by quarter: 24–14, 31–22, 10–14, 23–11
Pts: Okockytė 17; Rebs: Grigalauskytė 18; Asts: Visgaudaite, Okockytė 4		Pts: Ursu 16; Rebs: Stoiedin 6 Asts: Bigica 3

SC "Slana Bara", Novi Sad
Attendance: 100
Referees: Milan Brziak (SVK), Oskars Lucis (LAT), Aliaksandr Syrytsa (BLR)

9 July 2011
18:15

Report

Turkey	63–64	Russia
Scoring by quarter: 14–20, 24–14, 10–18, 15–12
Pts: Cora 22; Rebs: Ural, Gökdemir 8 Asts: Yavas, Cora 3		Pts: Tarasova 13; Rebs: Tarasova 16; Asts: Panevina 5

SC "Slana Bara", Novi Sad
Attendance: 100
Referees: Petar Obradovic (BIH), Francisco Araña (ESP), Chris Dodds (SCO)

=== Group C ===
Team	Pld	W	L	PF	PA	PD	Pts	Tiebreaker
France	3	3	0	207	168	+39	6	
Italy	3	2	1	198	155	+43	5	
Netherlands	3	1	2	177	166	+11	4	
Belarus	3	0	3	145	238	−93	3	

7 July 2011
13:45

Report

Belarus	42–75	Netherlands
Scoring by quarter: 12–19, 14–17, 9–15, 7–24
Pts: Bohdan 13; Rebs: Papova 8 Asts: three players 1		Pts: Essenstam 16; Rebs: Grinsven 17; Asts: Grinsven, Kleijn 3

Sports Hall "Kristalna Dvorana", Zrenjanin
Attendance: 100

7 July 2011
16:00

Report

Italy	58–60	France
Scoring by quarter: 14–14, 13–17, 16–12, 15–17
Pts: Tava 19; Rebs: Tava, Tognalini 6 Asts: Leva 2		Pts: Corre, Gandega 14; Rebs: Corre, Minte 11; Asts: Gandega 3

Sports Hall "Kristalna Dvorana", Zrenjanin
Attendance: 200

8 July 2011
13:45

Report

France	81–52	Belarus
Scoring by quarter: 18–15, 8–14, 22–7, 33–16
Pts: Samson 20; Rebs: Minte 14; Asts: Strunc, Corre 4		Pts: Filonchyk 9 Rebs: Filonchyk, Papova 9 Asts: Sivaplias 3

Sports Hall "Kristalna Dvorana", Zrenjanin
Attendance: 100
Referees: Milan Mazic (SRB), Zoran Zlatevski (MKD), Gintaras Vitkauskas (LTU)

8 July 2011
20:30

Report

Netherlands	44–58	Italy
Scoring by quarter: 16–13, 9–14, 11–14, 8–17
Pts: Grinsven 13; Rebs: Grinsven 14; Asts: Butter, Grinsven 2		Pts: Spreafico 13; Rebs: Tognalini 7 Asts: Bestagno 5

Sports Hall "Kristalna Dvorana", Zrenjanin
Attendance: 200
Referees: Janusz Calik (POL), Vladyslav Isachenko (UKR), Semen Ovinov (RUS)

9 July 2011
18:15

Report

Belarus	51–82	Italy
Scoring by quarter: 15–11, 9–21, 13–29, 14–21
Pts: Filonchyk 18; Rebs: Filonchyk 9 Asts: Filonchyk 2		Pts: Spreafico 16; Rebs: Federica Tognalini 12; Asts: Spreafico 6

Sports Hall "Kristalna Dvorana", Zrenjanin
Attendance: 200
Referees: Bernard Vassallo (MLT), Serghei Tislenco (MDA), Semen Ovinov (RUS)

9 July 2011
20:30

Report

France	66–58	Netherlands
Scoring by quarter: 14–16, 16–12, 17–18, 19–12
Pts: Elenga 20; Rebs: Elenga 9 Asts: three players 3		Pts: Kleijn 19; Rebs: Grinsven 13; Asts: seven players 1

Sports Hall "Kristalna Dvorana", Zrenjanin
Attendance: 200
Referees: Miodrag Licina (SRB), Janusz Calik (POL), Clemens Fritz (GER)

=== Group D ===
Team	Pld	W	L	PF	PA	PD	Pts	Tiebreaker
Spain	3	3	0	217	114	+113	6	
Great Britain	3	1	2	140	184	−44	4	1–1 +6
Latvia	3	1	2	159	181	−22	4	1–1 –1
Slovakia	3	1	2	109	146	−37	4	1–1 –5

7 July 2011
18:15

Report

Slovakia	39–38	Great Britain
Scoring by quarter: 14–10, 10–10, 9–11, 6–7
Pts: Kissová 11; Rebs: Kissová, Hruscáková 8 Asts: Slamová 4		Pts: Clark 9 Rebs: Fagbenle 11; Asts: Sheils 4

Sports Hall "Kristalna Dvorana", Zrenjanin
Attendance: 200

7 July 2011
20:30

Report

Latvia	46–67	Spain
Scoring by quarter: 5–19, 15–14, 11–24, 15–10
Pts: Surkusa 11; Rebs: Niedola 15; Asts: Niedola 5		Pts: Vila 21; Rebs: Blé 12; Asts: Gastaminza 4

Sports Hall "Kristalna Dvorana", Zrenjanin
Attendance: 200

8 July 2011
16:00

Report

Spain	59–27	Slovakia
Scoring by quarter: 25–5, 10–10, 15–4, 9–8
Pts: Gastaminza 12; Rebs: Gastaminza 8 Asts: Rodriguez 3		Pts: Baburova, Slamová 6 Rebs: Hruscáková 8 Asts: four players 1

Sports Hall "Kristalna Dvorana", Zrenjanin
Attendance: 200
Referees: Miodrag Licina (SRB), Fabiana Nitu (ROU), Serkan Emlek (TUR)

8 July 2011
18:15

Report

Great Britain	71–64	Latvia
Scoring by quarter: 13–24, 25–9, 22–15, 11–16
Pts: Busch 20; Rebs: Fagbenle 10; Asts: Busch 8		Pts: Vitola 25; Rebs: Vitola 13; Asts: Niedola 3

Sports Hall "Kristalna Dvorana", Zrenjanin
Attendance: 100
Referees: Bernard Vassallo (MLT), Serghei Tislenco (MDA), Clemens Fritz (GER)

9 July 2011
13:45

Report

Spain	81–31	Great Britain
Scoring by quarter: 14–7, 26–7, 27–11, 14–6
Pts: Gimeno 18; Rebs: Gil 9 Asts: Ortiz 6		Pts: Hayward 10; Rebs: Clark 6 Asts: four players 1

Sports Hall "Kristalna Dvorana", Zrenjanin
Attendance: 100
Referees: Zoran Zlatevski (MKD), Vladyslav Isachenko (UKR), Gintaras Vitkauskas (LTU)

9 July 2011
16:00

Report

Slovakia	43–49	Latvia
Scoring by quarter: 1–15, 12–8, 15–12, 15–14
Pts: Oroszová, Slamová 10; Rebs: Kissová 7 Asts: Páleníková 3		Pts: Niedola 9 Rebs: Niedola 12; Asts: Brance 3

Sports Hall "Kristalna Dvorana", Zrenjanin
Attendance: 100
Referees: Milan Mazic (SRB), Fabiana Nitu (ROU), Serkan Emlek (TUR)

== Qualifying round ==
The twelve teams remaining will be allocated in two groups of six teams each. The four top teams advance to the quarterfinals. The last two teams of each group play for the 9th–12th place.

Team advance to Quarterfinals
Team compete in 9th–12th playoffs

=== Group E ===
Team	Pld	W	L	PF	PA	PD	Pts	Tiebreaker
Russia	5	4	1	332	309	+23	9	
Serbia	5	3	2	361	326	+35	8	1–1 +27
Poland	5	3	2	320	330	−10	8	1–1 –2
Ukraine	5	3	2	312	329	−17	8	1–1 –25
Lithuania	5	1	4	319	340	−21	6	1–0
Turkey	5	1	4	304	314	−10	6	0–1

11 July 2011
16:00

Report

Lithuania	60–67	Poland
Scoring by quarter: 16–14, 17–12, 14–16, 13–25
Pts: Mažionytė 14; Rebs: Grigalauskytė, Svarytė 11; Asts: Visgaudaitė, Druskytė		Pts: Misiuk 20; Rebs: Misiuk 11; Asts: Kuras 7

SC "Slana Bara", Novi Sad
Attendance: 100
Referees: Petar Obradovic (BIH), Alessandro Martolini (ITA), Zoran Zlatevski (MKD)

11 July 2011
18:15

Report

Russia	61–54	Ukraine
Scoring by quarter: 17–15, 17–10, 10–15, 17–14
Pts: Tarasova 14; Rebs: Medvedeva 7 Asts: Shilova, Nizamova 4		Pts: Iagupova 18; Rebs: Malashenko 16; Asts: Iagupova 4

SC "Slana Bara", Novi Sad
Attendance: 100
Referees: Chris Dodds (SCO), Nicolas Maestre (FRA), Maka Kupatadze (GEO)

11 July 2011
20:30

Report

Turkey	53–64	Serbia
Scoring by quarter: 18–17, 16–11, 11–20, 8–16
Pts: Yavas 14; Rebs: Ural 21; Asts: Yavas 3		Pts: Vučurović 19; Rebs: Adjuković, Krnjić 11; Asts: Krnjić 3

SC "Slana Bara", Novi Sad
Attendance: 350
Referees: Radomir Vojinovic (MNE), Milan Brziak (SVK), Oskars Lucis (LAT)

12 July 2011
16:00

Report

Turkey	62–74	Ukraine
Scoring by quarter: 23–17, 13–14, 11–20, 15–23
Pts: Cora 23; Rebs: Ural 8 Asts: Cora, Yavas 3		Pts: Iagupova 21; Rebs: Naumenko, Malashenko 15; Asts: Malashenko 4

SC "Slana Bara", Novi Sad
Attendance: 100
Referees: Chris Dodds (SCO), Aliaksandr Syrytsa (BLR), Paulus Van Den Heuvel (NED)

12 July 2011
18:15

Report

Poland	72–66	Russia
Scoring by quarter: 12–9, 18–18, 19–21, 23–18
Pts: Zietara, Misiuk 15; Rebs: Misiuk 10; Asts: Kuras 5		Pts: Dorosheva 19; Rebs: Tarasova 10; Asts: Dorosheva 3

SC "Slana Bara", Novi Sad
Attendance: 100
Referees: Francisco Araña (ESP), Milan Brziak (SVK), Vladyslav Isachenko (UKR)

12 July 2011
20:30

Report

Serbia	78–72	Lithuania
Scoring by quarter: 22–26, 18–13, 21–10, 17–23
Pts: Ajduković 19; Rebs: Krnjić 9 Asts: three players 3		Pts: Okockytė 18; Rebs: Grigalauskytė, Svarytė 13; Asts: Okockytė 3

SC "Slana Bara", Novi Sad
Attendance: 500
Referees: Nicolas Maestre (FRA), Petar Obradovic (BIH), Maka Kupatadze (GEO)

13 July 2011
16:00

Report

Poland	48–69	Turkey
Scoring by quarter: 5–24, 13–16, 14–11, 16–18
Pts: Misiuk 10; Rebs: Marciniak 8 Asts: three players 2		Pts: Yavas 13; Rebs: Cora, Ural 15; Asts: Cora 4

SC "Slana Bara", Novi Sad
Attendance: 100
Referees: Paulus Van Den Heuvel (NED), Aliaksandr Syrytsa (BLR), Milan Brziak (SVK)

13 July 2011
18:15

Report

Lithuania	68–71	Ukraine
Scoring by quarter: 13–22, 20–13, 19–18, 16–18
Pts: Svarytė 17; Rebs: Grigalauskytė 15; Asts: Visgaudaitė 5		Pts: Iagupova 18; Rebs: Malashenko, Maznichenko 13; Asts: Iagupova 7

SC "Slana Bara", Novi Sad
Attendance: 100
Referees: Nicolas Maestre (FRA), Zoran Zlatevski (MKD), Petar Obradovic (BIH)

13 July 2011
20:30

Report

Russia	74–65	Serbia
Scoring by quarter: 14–11, 20–19, 30–13, 10–22
Pts: Tarasova 23; Rebs: Tarasova 9 Asts: Finogentova 4		Pts: Krnjić 24; Rebs: Krnjić 15; Asts: Čolić 5

SC "Slana Bara", Novi Sad
Attendance: 600
Referees: Oskars Lucis (LAT), Francisco Araña (ESP), Radomir Vojinovic (MNE)

=== Group F ===
Team	Pld	W	L	PF	PA	PD	Pts	Tiebreaker
Spain	5	5	0	354	185	+169	10	
France	5	3	2	284	308	−24	8	1–0
Italy	5	3	2	269	266	+3	8	0–1
Great Britain	5	2	3	266	309	−43	7	
Latvia	5	1	4	300	341	−41	6	1–0
Netherlands	5	1	4	266	330	−64	6	0–1

11 July 2011
16:00

Report

Latvia	62–75	France
Scoring by quarter: 25–20, 19–21, 13–17, 5–17
Pts: Niedola 19; Rebs: Niedola 10; Asts: Fomina, Rozenberga 3		Pts: Strunc, Samson 15; Rebs: Minte 10; Asts: Bousbaa 6

Sports Hall "Kristalna Dvorana", Zrenjanin
Attendance: 100
Referees: Bernard Vassallo (MLT), Janusz Calik (POL), Semen Ovinov (RUS)

11 July 2011
18:15

Report

Netherlands	36–73	Spain
Scoring by quarter: 17–14, 10–24, 0–16, 9–19
Pts: Essenstam 13; Rebs: van Grinsven, Treffers 4 Asts: six players 1		Pts: Casas 18; Rebs: Blé 9 Asts: Ortiz 5

Sports Hall "Kristalna Dvorana", Zrenjanin
Attendance: 200
Referees: Milan Mazic (SRB), Serghei Tislenco (MDA), Serkan Emlek (TUR)

11 July 2011
20:30

Report

Great Britain	36–44	Italy
Scoring by quarter: 6–13, 14–8, 9–12, 7–11
Pts: Chiemeka 10; Rebs: Chiemeka 9 Asts: Allison 2		Pts: Tava, Tognalini 13; Rebs: Tognalini 10; Asts: Bestagno 3

Sports Hall "Kristalna Dvorana", Zrenjanin
Attendance: 200
Referees: Miodrag Licina (SRB), Fabiana Nitu (ROU), Clemens Fritz (GER)

12 July 2011
16:00

Report

Latvia	67–58	Netherlands
Scoring by quarter: 18–10, 17–10, 15–28, 17–10
Pts: Niedola 20; Rebs: Vitola, Niedola 13; Asts: Rozenberga, Niedola 4		Pts: Treffers 15; Rebs: van Grinsven 7 Asts: Marlou de Kleijn 3

Sports Hall "Kristalna Dvorana", Zrenjanin
Attendance: 100
Referees: Bernard Vassallo (MLT), Fabiana Nitu (ROU), Clemens Fritz (GER)

12 July 2011
18:15

Report

France	50–62	Great Britain
Scoring by quarter: 18–21, 4–6, 12–16, 16–19
Pts: Minte 14; Rebs: Minte 9 Asts: Gandega 4		Pts: Clark 16; Rebs: Hurd, Clark 7 Asts: Sheils 4

Sports Hall "Kristalna Dvorana", Zrenjanin
Attendance: 200
Referees: Milan Mazic (SRB), Serghei Tislenco (MDA), Serkan Emlek (TUR)

12 July 2011
20:30

Report

Italy	39–65	Spain
Scoring by quarter: 16–16, 3–8, 4–22, 16–19
Pts: Galbiati 7 Rebs: Tognalini 6 Asts: Tava 2		Pts: Gil 11; Rebs: Gil 10; Asts: Ortiz 4

Sports Hall "Kristalna Dvorana", Zrenjanin
Attendance: 300
Referees: Miodrag Licina (SRB), Janusz Calik (POL), Semen Ovinov (RUS)

13 July 2011
16:00

Report

Great Britain	66–70	Netherlands
Scoring by quarter: 19–17, 13–18, 15–18, 19–17
Pts: Fagbenle 14; Rebs: Fagbenle 11; Asts: Busch 4		Pts: van Grinsven 19; Rebs: Essenstam, van Grinsven 13; Asts: Adams 3

Sports Hall "Kristalna Dvorana", Zrenjanin
Attendance: 200
Referees: Miodrag Licina (SRB), Serkan Emlek (TUR), Semen Ovinov (RUS)

13 July 2011
18:15

Report

Italy	70–61	Latvia
Scoring by quarter: 18–16, 21–12, 17–15, 14–18
Pts: Tava 29; Rebs: Tognalini, De Petto 6 Asts: Nannucci 5		Pts: Kirsteine 17; Rebs: Vitola 11; Asts: Kirsteine 4

Sports Hall "Kristalna Dvorana", Zrenjanin
Attendance: 200
Referees: Janusz Calik (POL), Serghei Tislenco (MDA), Clemens Fritz (GER)

13 July 2011
20:30

Report

Spain	68–33	France
Scoring by quarter: 16–9, 15–9, 19–11, 18–4
Pts: Rodriguez 16; Rebs: Gastaminza, Gil 9 Asts: three players 3		Pts: Elenga 8 Rebs: Elenga 8 Asts: Gaubo 3

Sports Hall "Kristalna Dvorana", Zrenjanin
Attendance: 300
Referees: Milan Mazic (SRB), Bernard Vassallo (MLT), Fabiana Nitu (ROU)

== Classification round ==
The last teams of each group in the preliminary round will compete in this Classification Round. The four teams will play in one group. The last two teams will be relegated to Division B for the next season.

Team will be relegated to 2012 FIBA Europe Under-20 Championship for Women Division B

=== Group G ===
Team	Pld	W	L	PF	PA	PD	Pts	Tiebreaker
Slovakia	6	5	1	335	272	+63	11	
Belarus	6	4	2	392	344	+48	10	
Germany	6	2	4	334	367	−33	8	
Romania	6	1	5	286	364	−78	7	

11 July 2011
18:15

Report

Germany	46–55	Slovakia
Scoring by quarter: 12–20, 9–11, 13–12, 12–12
Pts: Greinacher 21; Rebs: Greinacher 11; Asts: Schaake, Greinacher 2		Pts: Bálintová 12; Rebs: Hruscáková 7 Asts: Bálintová 3

Spens Sports Center, Novi Sad
Attendance: 100

11 July 2011
20:30

Report

Romania	50–64	Belarus
Scoring by quarter: 14–20, 14–21, 7–14, 15–9
Pts: Cursaru 13; Rebs: Baluta 13; Asts: Ursu 4		Pts: Bohdan 16; Rebs: Ivashchanka 15; Asts: Papova 6

Spens Sports Center, Novi Sad
Attendance: 100

12 July 2011
18:15

Report

Slovakia	54–33	Romania
Scoring by quarter: 12–12, 16–2, 18–7, 8–12
Pts: Oravcová 12; Rebs: Staneková, Oroszová 12; Asts: Bálintová 5		Pts: Bigica 15; Rebs: Bigica 5 Asts: Cursaru 3

Spens Sports Center, Novi Sad
Attendance: 100

12 July 2011
20:30

Report

Belarus	71–73	Germany
Scoring by quarter: 19–15, 12–21, 19–16, 21–21
Pts: Musatava 26; Rebs: Bohdan 9 Asts: Ivashchanka, Musatava 3		Pts: Karic 15; Rebs: Gaudermann 9 Asts: Brunckhorst 4

Spens Sports Center, Novi Sad
Attendance: 100

13 July 2011
18:15

Report

Germany	65–50	Romania
Scoring by quarter: 9–12, 12–11, 26–16, 18–11
Pts: Greinacher 25; Rebs: Schnorr, Greinacher 15; Asts: Brunckhorst 3		Pts: Bigica 17; Rebs: Bigica 11; Asts: Cursaru 3

Spens Sports Center, Novi Sad
Attendance: 50

13 July 2011
20:30

Report

Belarus	49–60	Slovakia
Scoring by quarter: 10–14, 11–15, 15–21, 13–10
Pts: Bohdan 16; Rebs: Papova 8 Asts: Musatava 3		Pts: Páleníková 15; Rebs: Oroszová 13; Asts: Páleníková, Baburova 3

Spens Sports Center, Novi Sad
Attendance: 100

15 July 2011
13:45

Report

Slovakia	58–41	Germany
Scoring by quarter: 12–11, 11–2, 12–12, 23–16
Pts: Bálintová 18; Rebs: Hruscáková 12; Asts: Páleníková, Bálintová 3		Pts: Brunckhorst 14; Rebs: Brunckhorst, Greinacher 6 Asts: Schnorr, Frankenberger 2

SC "Slana Bara", Novi Sad
Attendance: 100
Referees: Chris Dodds (SCO), Serghei Tislenco (MDA), Snehal Bendke (IND)

15 July 2011
16:00

Report

Belarus	72–53	Romania
Scoring by quarter: 21–19, 17–13, 17–16, 17–5
Pts: Filonchyk 23; Rebs: Filonchyk 12; Asts: Filonchyk 3		Pts: Bigica 21; Rebs: Ursu 11; Asts: Cursaru, Ursu 2

SC "Slana Bara", Novi Sad
Attendance: 100
Referees: Referees: Oskars Lucis (LAT), Gintaras Vitkauskas (LTU), Serkan Emlek (TUR)

16 July 2011
13:45

Report

Germany	65–'83	Belarus
Scoring by quarter: 18–17, 16–18, 11–19, 20–29
Pts: Greinacher 13; Rebs: Greinacher 15; Asts: Brunckhorst, Frankenberger 3		Pts: Filonchyk 22; Rebs: Filonchyk 10; Asts: Bohdan 3

SC "Slana Bara", Novi Sad
Attendance: 100
Referees: Francisco Araña (ESP), Milan Mazic (SRB), Gintaras Vitkauskas (LTU)

16 July 2011
16:00

Report

Romania	50–65	Slovakia
Scoring by quarter: 20–15, 10–16, 9–18, 11–16
Pts: Bigica 19; Rebs: Bigica 5 Asts: Cursaru 3		Pts: Slamová, Baburova 12; Rebs: Hruscáková 8 Asts: Slamová 3

SC "Slana Bara", Novi Sad
Attendance: 100
Referees: Zoran Zlatevski (MKD), Aliaksandr Syrytsa (BLR), Serkan Emlek (TUR)

17 July 2011
13:45

Report

Romania	50–44	Germany
Scoring by quarter: 8–16, 4–13, 18–9, 20–6
Pts: Ursu 19; Rebs: Ursu 10; Asts: Ursu 9		Pts: Greinacher 12; Rebs: Greinacher 10; Asts: Karic 3

SC "Slana Bara", Novi Sad

17 July 2011
16:00

Report

Slovakia	43–53	Belarus
Scoring by quarter: 6–13, 6–9, 11–19, 20–12
Pts: Slamová 13; Rebs: Oroszová 14; Asts: Slamová 2		Pts: Bohdan, Papova 14; Rebs: Bohdan, Papova 8 Asts: Filonchyk, Papova 2

SC "Slana Bara", Novi Sad
Attendance: 100

== Knockout round ==
=== 9th–12th playoffs ===
Semi-finals
July 15 – Novi Sad
Lithuania	56
Netherlands	68
July 15 – Novi Sad
Latvia	51
Turkey	64

Ninth place
July 16 – Novi Sad
Netherlands	58
Turkey	75
Eleventh place
July 16 – Novi Sad
Lithuania	76
Latvia	67

==== 9th–12th semifinals ====
15 July 2011
18:10

Report

Lithuania	56–68	Netherlands
Scoring by quarter: 14–14, 19–22, 9–11, 14–21
Pts: Okockytė 16; Rebs: Grigalauskytė, Svarytė 11; Asts: Okockytė, Kaminskytė 2		Pts: van Grinsven 20; Rebs: van Grinsven 14; Asts: Kleijn 6

SC "Slana Bara", Novi Sad
Attendance: 100
Referees: Radomir Vojinovic (MNE), Alessandro Martolini (ITA), Clemens Fritz (GER)

15 July 2011
20:30

Report

Latvia	51–64	Turkey
Scoring by quarter: 12–21, 18–17, 13–9, 8–17
Pts: Niedola 12; Rebs: Vitola, Surkusa 8 Asts: Kirsteine 4		Pts: Yavas 24; Rebs: Ural 19; Asts: Yavas 5

SC "Slana Bara", Novi Sad
Attendance: 100
Referees: Zoran Zlatevski (MKD), Vladyslav Isachenko (UKR), Aliaksandr Syrytsa (BLR)

==== 11th place playoff ====
16 July 2011
18:15

Report

Lithuania	76–67	Latvia
Scoring by quarter: 21–17, 17–20, 17–15, '21–15
Pts: Svarytė 16; Rebs: Grigalauskytė 12; Asts: Okockytė 5		Pts: Brance 15; Rebs: Vitola 8 Asts: four players 3

SC "Slana Bara", Novi Sad
Attendance: 100
Referees: Miodrag Licina (SRB), Semen Ovinov (RUS), Snehal Bendke (IND)

==== 9th place playoff ====
16 July 2011
20:30

Report

Netherlands	58–75	Turkey
Scoring by quarter: 10–21, 11–11, 16–11, 21–32
Pts: Essenstam 15; Rebs: Treffers 7 Asts: three players 2		Pts: Cora, Yavas 15; Rebs: Ural 14; Asts: Ural 4

SC "Slana Bara", Novi Sad
Attendance: 100
Referees: Bernard Vassallo (MLT), Fabiana Nitu (ROU), Janusz Calik (POL)

=== 5th–8th playoffs ===
Semi-finals
July 16 – Novi Sad
Great Britain	39
France	55
July 16 – Novi Sad
Italy	51
Ukraine	86

Fifth place
July 17 – Novi Sad
France	63
Ukraine	62
Seventh place
July 17 – Novi Sad
Great Britain	48
Italy	60

==== 5th–8th semifinals ====
16 July 2011
13:45

Report

Great Britain	39–55	France
Scoring by quarter: 8–9, 13–7, 8–16, 10–23
Pts: Fagbenle 15; Rebs: Sheils, Fagbenle 6 Asts: Sheils 4		Pts: Bousbaa 17; Rebs: Minte 15; Asts: Minte 4

Spens Sports Center, Novi Sad
Attendance: 150
Referees: Paulus Van Den Heuvel (NED), Vladyslav Isachenko (UKR), Alessandro Martolini (ITA)

16 July 2011
16:00

Report

Italy	51–86	Ukraine
Scoring by quarter: 11–25, 14–22, 10–20, 16–19
Pts: Tava 14; Rebs: Tognalini, De Pretto 9 Asts: Leva 3		Pts: Iagupova 24; Rebs: Maznichenko 15; Asts: Iagupova 10

Spens Sports Center, Novi Sad
Attendance: 100
Referees: Chris Dodds (SCO), Milan Brziak (SVK), Clemens Fritz (GER)

==== 7th place playoff ====
17 July 2011
13:45

Report

Great Britain	48–60	Italy
Scoring by quarter: 8–19, 14–16, 10–7, 16–18
Pts: Chiemeka, Fagbenle 10; Rebs: Fagbenle 8 Asts: Clark 3		Pts: Tognalini 17; Rebs: Tognalini 10; Asts: Bestagno 5

Spens Sports Center, Novi Sad
Attendance: 100
Referees: Maka Kupatadze (GEO), Milan Brziak (SVK), Snehal Bendke (IND)

==== 5th place playoff ====
17 July 2011
16:00

Report

France	63–62	Ukraine
Scoring by quarter: 14–16, 19–14, 14–14, 16–18
Pts: Minte 15; Rebs: Minte 21; Asts: Minte 4		Pts: Malashenko 21; Rebs: Iagupova 9 Asts: Iagupova 5

Spens Sports Center, Novi Sad
Attendance: 150
Referees: Paulus Van Den Heuvel (NED), Serghei Tislenco (MDA), Alessandro Martolini (ITA)

=== Championship ===
Quarter-finals
July 15 – Novi Sad
Russia	68
Great Britain	37
July 15 – Novi Sad
France	47
Poland	62
July 15 – Novi Sad
Serbia	60
Italy	55
July 15 – Novi Sad
Spain	67
Ukraine	57

Semi-finals
July 16– Novi Sad
Russia	68
Poland	52
July 16 – Novi Sad
Serbia	38
Spain	75

Final
July 17 – Novi Sad
Russia	53
Spain	62
Third place
July 17 – Novi Sad
Poland	67
Serbia	65

==== Quarterfinals ====
15 July 2011
13:45

Report

Russia	68–37	Great Britain
Scoring by quarter: 20–8, 16–13, 13–6, 19–10
Pts: Medvedeva, Tarasova 13; Rebs: Solovyeva 9 Asts: Finogentova 3		Pts: Clark, Hurd 9 Rebs: Chiemeka, Clark 5 Asts: Salmon 2

Spens Sports Center, Novi Sad
Attendance: 50
Referees: Francisco Araña (ESP), Miodrag Licina (SRB), Fabiana Nitu (ROU)

15 July 2011
16:00

Report

France	47–62	Poland
Scoring by quarter: 15–15, 8–12, 9–19, 15–16
Pts: Samson 16; Rebs: Minte 14; Asts: Bousbaa 3		Pts: Zietara 19; Rebs: Mistygacz, Cebulska 7 Asts: three players 2

Spens Sports Center, Novi Sad
Attendance: 100
Referees: Milan Mazic (SRB), Milan Brziak (SVK), Maka Kupatadze (GEO)

15 July 2011
18:15

Report

Spain	67–57	Ukraine
Scoring by quarter: 9–13, 13–16, 21–17, 24–11
Pts: Casas 14; Rebs: Blé 11; Asts: Rodriguez 6		Pts: Malashenko 17; Rebs: Malashenko, Maznichenko 7 Asts: Iagupova 5

Spens Sports Center, Novi Sad
Attendance: 300
Referees: Petar Obradovic (BIH), Paulus Van Den Heuvel (NED), Janusz Calik (POL)

15 July 2011
20:30

Report

Serbia	60–55	Italy
Scoring by quarter: 17–13, 15–14, 17–11, 11–17
Pts: Marković 14; Rebs: Ajduković, Krnjić 9 Asts: Čolić 4		Pts: Tognalini 15; Rebs: Tava, Tognalini 7 Asts: Bestagno 3

Spens Sports Center, Novi Sad
Attendance: 700
Referees: Nicolas Maestre (FRA), Bernard Vassallo (MLT), Semen Ovinov (RUS)

==== Semifinals ====
16 July 2011
18:15

Report

Russia	68–52	Poland
Scoring by quarter: 17–11, 11–21, 18–6, 22–14
Pts: Shilova 23; Rebs: Shilova 10; Asts: Panevina 7		Pts: Misiuk 16; Rebs: Szczepanik 6 Asts: Kuras, Mistygacz 3

Spens Sports Center, Novi Sad
Attendance: 200
Referees: Petar Obradovic (BIH), Radomir Vojinovic (MNE), Serghei Tislenco (MDA)

16 July 2011
20:30

Report

Spain	75–38	Serbia
Scoring by quarter: 16–6, 24–14, 21–4, 14–14
Pts: Gimeno 16; Rebs: Blé, Casas 11; Asts: Vila 5		Pts: Krnjić 14; Rebs: Ajduković 11; Asts: Vučurović 3

Spens Sports Center, Novi Sad
Attendance: 900
Referees: Nicolas Maestre (FRA), Oskars Lucis (LAT), Maka Kupatadze (GEO)

==== Bronze-medal game ====
17 July 2011
18:15

Report

Poland	67–65	Serbia
Scoring by quarter: 19–17, 22–14, 13–23, 13–11
Pts: Zietara 16; Rebs: Misiuk 10; Asts: Zietara 4		Pts: Krnjić 18; Rebs: three players 11; Asts: Živadinović 3

Spens Sports Center, Novi Sad
Attendance: 700
Referees: Francisco Araña (ESP), Bernard Vassallo (MLT), Clemens Fritz (GER)

==== Final ====
17 July 2011
20:30

Report

Russia	53–62	Spain
Scoring by quarter: 10–16, 11–13, 19–13, 13–20
Pts: Shilova 18; Rebs: Shilova 11; Asts: Finogentova, Panevina 3		Pts: Casas 21; Rebs: Gastaminza, Casas 6 Asts: Blé 2

Spens Sports Center, Novi Sad
Attendance: 600
Referees: Milan Mazic (SRB), Chris Dodds (SCO), Fabiana Nitu (ROU)

== Final standings ==
Rank	Team	Record
Gold medal	Spain	9–0
Silver medal	Russia	8–1
Bronze medal	Poland	6–3
4th	Serbia	5–4
5th	France	6–3
6th	Ukraine	5–4
7th	Italy	5–4
8th	Great Britain	2–7
9th	Turkey	4–4
10th	Netherlands	3–5
11th	Lithuania	3–5
12th	Latvia	2–6
13th	Slovakia	6–3
14th	Belarus	3–6
15th	Germany	2–7
16th	Romania	1–8

2011 FIBA Europe Under-20 Championship for Women winner

Spain
Second title

Most Valuable Player
(Spain) Queralt Casas

Team relegated to 2012 FIBA Europe Under-20 Championship for Women Division B
