= EuroBasket Women 2017 squads =

This article displays the rosters for the teams competing at the EuroBasket Women 2017. Each team had to submit 12 players.

== Group A ==
=== Czech Republic ===
The final squad was announced on 14 June 2017.

Czech Republic women's national basketball team roster
Players
Coaches

Pos.	No.	Name	Age – Date of birth	Height	Club	Ctr.
C	1	Kia Vaughn	30 – 24 January 1987	1.93 m (6 ft 4 in)	USK Praha	(Czech Republic)
SF	4	Michaela Stejskalová	30 – 4 April 1987	1.86 m (6 ft 1 in)	CB Islas Canarias	(Spain)
SF	6	Karolína Elhotová	25 – 7 January 1992	1.82 m (6 ft 0 in)	USK Praha	(Czech Republic)
PF	7	Alena Hanušová	26 – 29 May 1991	1.91 m (6 ft 3 in)	USK Praha	(Czech Republic)
C	8	Ilona Burgrová	33 – 15 March 1984	1.94 m (6 ft 4 in)	USK Praha	(Czech Republic)
PG	9	Lenka Bartáková	26 – 17 May 1991	1.75 m (5 ft 9 in)	Basketball Nymburk	(Czech Republic)
SG	10	Veronika Voráčková	17 – 21 June 1999	1.75 m (5 ft 9 in)	USK Praha	(Czech Republic)
SF	11	Kateřina Elhotová	27 – 14 October 1989	1.80 m (5 ft 11 in)	USK Praha	(Czech Republic)
PG	12	Tereza Vyoralová	23 – 16 January 1994	1.76 m (5 ft 9 in)	USK Praha	(Czech Republic)
C	13	Petra Kulichová	32 – 13 September 1984	1.98 m (6 ft 6 in)	Botaş SK	(Turkey)
PG	14	Petra Záplatová	25 – 29 December 1991	1.75 m (5 ft 9 in)	BG 89 Hurricanes	(Germany)
PF	15	Pavla Švrdlíková	26 – 15 September 1990	1.85 m (6 ft 1 in)	BK Handicap Brno	(Czech Republic)

Head coach

- (Czech Republic) Ivan Beneš

Assistant coach(es)

- (Czech Republic) Jiří Bárta
- (Czech Republic) Tomáš Eisner

Legend

- Club – describes last
  club before the tournament
- Age – describes age
  on 16 June 2017

=== Hungary ===
The roster was announced on 11 June 2017.

Hungary women's national basketball team roster
Players
Coaches

Pos.	No.	Name	Age – Date of birth	Height	Club	Ctr.
SG	4	Zsófia Fegyverneky	32 – 29 September 1984	1.78 m (5 ft 10 in)	Uniqa Sopron	(Hungary)
SG	5	Krisztina Raksányi	25 – 26 September 1991	1.80 m (5 ft 11 in)	PEAC-Pécs	(Hungary)
PF	6	Zsófia Licskai	23 – 25 October 1993	1.89 m (6 ft 2 in)	PEAC-Pécs	(Hungary)
SG	7	Zsófia Simon	27 – 17 December 1989	1.80 m (5 ft 11 in)	UNI Győr	(Hungary)
SF	10	Zsófia Varga	28 – 15 January 1989	1.82 m (6 ft 0 in)	UNI Győr	(Hungary)
PG	11	Dóra Medgyessy	30 – 21 July 1986	1.73 m (5 ft 8 in)	VBW CEKK Ceglèd	(Hungary)
PG	12	Courtney Vandersloot	28 – 8 February 1989	1.73 m (5 ft 8 in)	Yakın Doğu Üniversitesi	(Turkey)
PF	14	Tijana Krivačević	27 – 8 April 1990	1.92 m (6 ft 4 in)	Girne Üniversitesi	(Turkey)
SF	15	Nóra Nagy-Bujdosó	31 – 18 November 1985	1.84 m (6 ft 0 in)	VBW CEKK Ceglèd	(Hungary)
SG	41	Debora Dubei	20 – 4 January 1997	1.82 m (6 ft 0 in)	Uniqa Sopron	(Hungary)
C	44	Bernadett Határ	22 – 24 August 1994	2.08 m (6 ft 10 in)	Uniqa Sopron	(Hungary)
SG	51	Dorina Zele	25 – 13 February 1992	1.85 m (6 ft 1 in)	PEAC-Pécs	(Hungary)

Head coach

- (Slovakia) Štefan Svitek

Assistant coach(es)

- (Hungary) Tamás Gall
- (Hungary) Ajtony Imreh

Legend

- Club – describes last
  club before the tournament
- Age – describes age
  on 16 June 2017

=== Spain ===
The roster was announced on 14 June 2017.

Spain women's national basketball team roster
Players
Coaches
}

Pos.	No.	Name	Age – Date of birth	Height	Club	Ctr.
PF	4	Laura Nicholls	28 – 26 February 1989	1.91 m (6 ft 3 in)	Virtus Eirene Ragusa	(Italy)
PG	6	Silvia Domínguez	30 – 31 January 1987	1.66 m (5 ft 5 in)	CB Avenida	(Spain)
SF	7	Alba Torrens	27 – 30 August 1989	1.90 m (6 ft 3 in)	UMMC Ekaterinburg	(Russia)
PG	9	Laia Palau	37 – 10 September 1979	1.79 m (5 ft 10 in)	USK Praha	(Czech Republic)
SG	10	Marta Xargay	26 – 20 December 1990	1.81 m (5 ft 11 in)	USK Praha	(Czech Republic)
SG	11	Leonor Rodríguez	25 – 21 October 1991	1.80 m (5 ft 11 in)	Uni Girona CB	(Spain)
C	14	Sancho Lyttle	33 – 20 September 1983	1.93 m (6 ft 4 in)	UMMC Ekaterinburg	(Russia)
SG	15	Anna Cruz	30 – 27 October 1986	1.76 m (5 ft 9 in)	Dynamo Kursk	(Russia)
PG	20	Leticia Romero	22 – 28 May 1995	1.73 m (5 ft 8 in)	Florida State Seminoles	(United States)
SF	22	María Conde	20 – 14 January 1997	1.86 m (6 ft 1 in)	Florida State Seminoles	(United States)
PF	24	Laura Gil	25 – 24 April 1992	1.91 m (6 ft 3 in)	CB Avenida	(Spain)
PF	28	Beatriz Sánchez	27 – 20 December 1989	1.90 m (6 ft 3 in)	Universitario de Ferrol	(Spain)

Head coach

- (Spain) Lucas Mondelo

Assistant coach(es)

- (Spain) Víctor Lapeña
- (Spain) Isabel Sánchez

Legend

- Club – describes last
  club before the tournament
- Age – describes age
  on 16 June 2017

=== Ukraine ===
Ukraine women's national basketball team roster
Players
Coaches

Pos.	No.	Name	Age – Date of birth	Height	Club	Ctr.
PG	5	Ievgeniia Spitkovska	29 – 10 May 1988	1.72 m (5 ft 8 in)	BC Avanhard Kyiv	(Ukraine)
SG	8	Vita Horobets	21 – 6 April 1996	1.80 m (5 ft 11 in)	BC TIM-SKUF Kyiv	(Ukraine)
SF	9	Liudmyla Naumenko	23 – 30 June 1993	1.87 m (6 ft 2 in)	ESB Villeneuve-d'Ascq	(France)
PF	10	Olga Maznichenko	25 – 24 July 1991	1.87 m (6 ft 2 in)	Montbrison Féminin	(France)
PF	13	Olesia Malashenko	26 – 21 February 1991	1.89 m (6 ft 2 in)	Mersin Büyükşehir	(Turkey)
SG	14	Alina Iagupova	25 – 9 February 1992	1.80 m (5 ft 11 in)	ESB Villeneuve-d'Ascq	(France)
PF	19	Taisiia Udodenko	28 – 7 May 1989	1.90 m (6 ft 3 in)	Basketball Nymburk	(Czech Republic)
PF	23	Olga Yatskovets	19 – 16 October 1997	1.89 m (6 ft 2 in)	BC Avanhard Kyiv	(Ukraine)
PG	24	D'Andra Moss	29 – 21 February 1988	1.80 m (5 ft 11 in)	Mersin Büyükşehir	(Turkey)
SF	31	Anna Olkhovyk	29 – 18 June 1987	1.86 m (6 ft 1 in)	BC TIM-SKUF Kyiv	(Ukraine)
SF	44	Kateryna Dorogobuzova	26 – 28 June 1990	1.87 m (6 ft 2 in)	UMCS Lublin	(Poland)
PG	88	Arina Bilotserkivska	27 – 3 December 1989	1.70 m (5 ft 7 in)	BC Interkhim Odesa	(Ukraine)

Head coach

- (Ukraine) Volodymyr Kholopov

Assistant coach(es)

- (Ukraine) Inna Kochubei
- (Ukraine) Sergii Vozniuk

Legend

- Club – describes last
  club before the tournament
- Age – describes age
  on 16 June 2017

== Group B ==
=== Belarus ===
The roster was announced on 15 June 2017.

Belarus women's national basketball team roster
Players
Coaches

Pos.	No.	Name	Age – Date of birth	Height	Club	Ctr.
SF	6	Katsiaryna Snytsina	31 – 2 September 1985	1.88 m (6 ft 2 in)	Hatay BSB	(Turkey)
SG	7	Yuliya Rytsikava	30 – 8 September 1986	1.80 m (5 ft 11 in)	Horizont Minsk	(Belarus)
SG	8	Tatsiana Likhtarovich	29 – 29 March 1988	1.78 m (5 ft 10 in)	UNI Győr	(Hungary)
PG	9	Volha Ziuzkova	34 – 14 June 1983	1.72 m (5 ft 8 in)	Hoptrans Sirenos	(Lithuania)
PF	13	Maryia Papova	23 – 13 June 1994	1.89 m (6 ft 2 in)	Galatasaray	(Turkey)
PF	14	Maryia Filonchyk	25 – 10 January 1992	1.88 m (6 ft 2 in)	Chevakata Vologda	(Russia)
C	15	Marina Kress	36 – 23 August 1980	1.94 m (6 ft 4 in)	Horizont Minsk	(Belarus)
PG	19	Alena Holubeva	23 – 4 April 1994	1.79 m (5 ft 10 in)	Olimpia Grodno	(Belarus)
PG	20	Alex Bentley	26 – 27 October 1990	1.73 m (5 ft 8 in)	Adana ASKİ SK	(Turkey)
C	21	Viktoryia Hasper	29 – 9 January 1988	1.92 m (6 ft 4 in)	BC Tsmoki-Minsk	(Belarus)
PF	23	Yanina Inkina	19 – 16 October 1997	1.87 m (6 ft 2 in)	South Plains College	(United States)
PF	25	Maryna Ivashchanka	23 – 8 November 1993	1.90 m (6 ft 3 in)	Energa Toruń	(Poland)

Head coach

- (Belarus) Nataliya Trafimava

Assistant coach(es)

- (Belarus) Aliaksei Pyntsikau

Legend

- Club – describes last
  club before the tournament
- Age – describes age
  on 16 June 2017

=== Italy ===
The roster was announced on 15 June 2017.

Italy women's national basketball team roster
Players
Coaches

Pos.	No.	Name	Age – Date of birth	Height	Club	Ctr.
PF	0	Elisa Penna	21 – 13 November 1995	1.88 m (6 ft 2 in)	Wake Forest Demon Deacons	(United States)
SG	5	Maddalena Gorini	25 – 8 January 1992	1.81 m (5 ft 11 in)	Virtus Eirene Ragusa	(Italy)
PG	7	Giorgia Sottana	28 – 15 December 1988	1.75 m (5 ft 9 in)	PF Schio	(Italy)
PF	9	Cecilia Zandalasini	21 – 16 March 1996	1.85 m (6 ft 1 in)	PF Schio	(Italy)
PG	10	Francesca Dotto	24 – 17 March 1993	1.70 m (5 ft 7 in)	Gesam Gas Lucca	(Italy)
SF	11	Raffaella Masciadri	36 – 30 September 1980	1.85 m (6 ft 1 in)	PF Schio	(Italy)
C	12	Alessandra Formica	24 – 13 March 1993	1.89 m (6 ft 2 in)	Virtus Eirene Ragusa	(Italy)
SF	13	Valeria De Pretto	25 – 16 November 1991	1.85 m (6 ft 1 in)	Cestistica Spezzina	(Italy)
PG	14	Martina Crippa	28 – 31 March 1989	1.78 m (5 ft 10 in)	Gesam Gas Lucca	(Italy)
C	22	Kathrin Ress	31 – 26 June 1985	1.93 m (6 ft 4 in)	PF Schio	(Italy)
PG	23	Sabrina Cinili	28 – 22 April 1989	1.91 m (6 ft 3 in)	Dike Basket Napoli	(Italy)
PF	29	Laura Macchi	38 – 24 May 1979	1.88 m (6 ft 2 in)	PF Schio	(Italy)

Head coach

- (Italy) Andrea Capobianco

Assistant coach(es)

- (Italy) Antonio Bocchino
- (Italy) Giavanni Lucchesi

Legend

- Club – describes last
  club before the tournament
- Age – describes age
  on 16 June 2017

=== Slovakia ===
The roster was announced on 10 June 2017.

Slovakia women's national basketball team roster
Players
Coaches

Pos.	No.	Name	Age – Date of birth	Height	Club	Ctr.
C	4	Rebeka Mikulášiková	17 – 31 July 1999	1.91 m (6 ft 3 in)	Piešťanské Čajky	(Slovakia)
SF	5	Veronika Remenárová	20 – 16 March 1997	1.86 m (6 ft 1 in)	Valosun Brno	(Czech Republic)
SG	7	Zuzana Žirková	37 – 6 June 1980	1.75 m (5 ft 9 in)	Good Angels Košice	(Slovakia)
SG	8	Nikola Dudášová	22 – 17 March 1995	1.78 m (5 ft 10 in)	Piešťanské Čajky	(Slovakia)
SF	9	Terezia Páleníková	21 – 16 August 1995	1.78 m (5 ft 10 in)	Piešťanské Čajky	(Slovakia)
PF	10	Sabina Oroszová	24 – 5 June 1993	1.92 m (6 ft 4 in)	Piešťanské Čajky	(Slovakia)
PG	11	Barbora Bálintová	22 – 15 December 1994	1.79 m (5 ft 10 in)	Good Angels Košice	(Slovakia)
C	13	Anna Jurčenková	31 – 26 July 1985	1.95 m (6 ft 5 in)	Good Angels Košice	(Slovakia)
C	14	Marie Růžičková	30 – 18 November 1986	1.92 m (6 ft 4 in)	Reyer Venezia Mestre	(Italy)
C	15	Romana Vyňuchalová	30 – 3 September 1986	1.95 m (6 ft 5 in)	ŠBK Šamorín	(Slovakia)
G	20	Nikola Kováčiková	18 – 6 January 1999	1.80 m (5 ft 11 in)	UKF Nitra	(Slovakia)
SG	23	Angelika Slamová	22 – 19 June 1994	1.70 m (5 ft 7 in)	Piešťanské Čajky	(Slovakia)

Head coach

- (Czech Republic) Marián Svoboda

Assistant coach(es)

- (Slovakia) Richard Kucsa

Legend

- Club – describes last
  club before the tournament
- Age – describes age
  on 16 June 2017

=== Turkey ===
Turkey women's national basketball team roster
Players
Coaches

Pos.	No.	Name	Age – Date of birth	Height	Club	Ctr.
PG	2	Pelin Bilgiç	22 – 15 July 1994	1.73 m (5 ft 8 in)	Fenerbahçe	(Turkey)
SG	3	Ayşe Cora	24 – 3 March 1993	1.75 m (5 ft 9 in)	Fenerbahçe	(Turkey)
PG	4	Olcay Çakır	23 – 13 July 1993	1.82 m (6 ft 0 in)	Yakın Doğu Üniversitesi	(Turkey)
PG	7	Birsel Vardarlı	32 – 12 July 1984	1.75 m (5 ft 9 in)	Fenerbahçe	(Turkey)
SF	9	Bahar Çağlar	28 – 28 September 1988	1.90 m (6 ft 3 in)	Yakın Doğu Üniversitesi	(Turkey)
PG	10	Işıl Alben	31 – 22 February 1986	1.72 m (5 ft 8 in)	Galatasaray	(Turkey)
PF	12	Tuğçe Canıtez	26 – 10 November 1990	1.88 m (6 ft 2 in)	Fenerbahçe	(Turkey)
C	13	Quanitra Hollingsworth	28 – 15 November 1988	1.97 m (6 ft 6 in)	Yakın Doğu Üniversitesi	(Turkey)
SF	14	Şaziye İvegin	35 – 8 February 1982	1.80 m (5 ft 11 in)	Abdullah Gül Üniversitesi	(Turkey)
PF	15	Tilbe Şenyürek	22 – 26 April 1995	1.89 m (6 ft 2 in)	Botaş SK	(Turkey)
SF	17	Cansu Köksal	23 – 28 April 1994	1.87 m (6 ft 2 in)	Galatasaray	(Turkey)
C	33	Esra Ural	25 – 18 August 1991	1.98 m (6 ft 6 in)	Fenerbahçe	(Turkey)

Head coach

- (Turkey) Ekrem Memnun

Assistant coach(es)

- (Turkey) Aziz Akkaya
- (Turkey) Emre Vatansever

Legend

- Club – describes last
  club before the tournament
- Age – describes age
  on 16 June 2017

== Group C ==
=== France ===
The roster was announced on 15 June 2017.

France women's national basketball team roster
Players
Coaches

Pos.	No.	Name	Age – Date of birth	Height	Club	Ctr.
SG	0	Olivia Époupa	23 – 30 April 1994	1.64 m (5 ft 5 in)	ESB Villeneuve-d'Ascq	(France)
C	5	Endéné Miyem	29 – 15 May 1988	1.88 m (6 ft 2 in)	PF Schio	(Italy)
C	8	Héléna Ciak	27 – 15 December 1989	1.97 m (6 ft 6 in)	Dynamo Kursk	(Russia)
PG	9	Céline Dumerc	34 – 9 July 1982	1.69 m (5 ft 7 in)	Basket Landes	(France)
F	10	Sarah Michel	28 – 10 January 1989	1.80 m (5 ft 11 in)	Basket Lattes	(France)
SF	11	Valériane Ayayi	23 – 29 April 1994	1.84 m (6 ft 0 in)	ESB Villeneuve-d'Ascq	(France)
G	12	Gaëlle Skrela	34 – 24 January 1983	1.77 m (5 ft 10 in)	Basket Lattes	(France)
SF	16	Hhadydia Minte	26 – 16 March 1991	1.87 m (6 ft 2 in)	Flammes Carolo basket	(France)
SG	17	Marine Johannès	22 – 21 January 1995	1.77 m (5 ft 10 in)	CJM Bourges Basket	(France)
C	18	Alexia Chartereau	18 – 5 September 1998	1.90 m (6 ft 3 in)	CJM Bourges Basket	(France)
C	25	Marielle Amant	27 – 9 December 1989	1.90 m (6 ft 3 in)	ESB Villeneuve-d'Ascq	(France)
PF	93	Diandra Tchatchouang	26 – 14 June 1991	1.89 m (6 ft 2 in)	CJM Bourges Basket	(France)

Head coach

- (France) Valérie Garnier

Assistant coach(es)

- (France) Grégory Halin
- (France) Olivier Lafargue

Legend

- Club – describes last
  club before the tournament
- Age – describes age
  on 16 June 2017

=== Greece ===
The roster was announced on 13 June 2017.

Greece women's national basketball team roster
Players
Coaches

Pos.	No.	Name	Age – Date of birth	Height	Club	Ctr.
PG	4	Anna Niki Stamolamprou	21 – 26 August 1995	1.70 m (5 ft 7 in)	Robert Morris Colonials	(United States)
SG	5	Evdokia Stamati	32 – 2 August 1984	1.78 m (5 ft 10 in)	Olympiacos	(Greece)
PG	6	Iouliti Lymoura	32 – 10 March 1985	1.80 m (5 ft 11 in)	PAOK	(Greece)
SF	7	Anna Spyridopoulou	28 – 2 November 1988	1.84 m (6 ft 0 in)	Olympiacos	(Greece)
SG	9	Evanthia Maltsi	38 – 30 December 1978	1.79 m (5 ft 10 in)	Olympiacos	(Greece)
PG	11	Angeliki Nikolopoulou	26 – 2 May 1991	1.74 m (5 ft 9 in)	Proteas Voulas BC	(Greece)
PF	12	Katerina Sotiriou	33 – 3 January 1984	1.84 m (6 ft 0 in)	Olympiacos	(Italy)
PF	13	Afroditi Kosma	34 – 6 June 1983	1.86 m (6 ft 1 in)	Olympiacos	(Greece)
PF	15	Artemis Spanou	24 – 1 January 1993	1.86 m (6 ft 1 in)	Uni Girona CB	(Spain)
SF	19	Styliani Kaltsidou	34 – 12 January 1983	1.88 m (6 ft 2 in)	Olympiacos	(Greece)
SF	21	Eleanna Christinaki	20 – 16 December 1996	1.84 m (6 ft 0 in)	Maryland Terrapins	(United States)
C	34	Mariella Fasoula	19 – 2 September 1997	1.92 m (6 ft 4 in)	Boston College Eagles	(United States)

Head coach

- (Greece) Konstantinos Keramidas

Assistant coach(es)

- (Greece) Eleni Kafantari

Legend

- (C) Team captain
- Club field describes the current club
- Age – describes age
  on 16 June 2017

=== Serbia ===
The roster was announced on 13 June 2017.

Serbia women's national basketball team roster
Players
Coaches

Pos.	No.	Name	Age – Date of birth	Height	Club
PG	4	Tamara Radočaj	29 – 23 December 1987	1.70 m (5 ft 7 in)	Chevakata Vologda	(Russia)
SF	5	Sonja Petrović	28 – 18 February 1989	1.89 m (6 ft 2 in)	USK Praha	(Czech Republic)
SG	6	Saša Čađo	27 – 13 July 1989	1.78 m (5 ft 10 in)	İstanbul Üniversitesi SK	(Turkey)
C	7	Sara Krnjić	25 – 15 July 1991	1.93 m (6 ft 4 in)	UNIQA Sopron	(Hungary)
SG	8	Nevena Jovanović	26 – 30 June 1990	1.80 m (5 ft 11 in)	Basket Landes	(France)
PF	9	Jelena Milovanović	28 – 28 April 1989	1.90 m (6 ft 3 in)	CB Avenida	(Spain)
SG	10	Sanja Mandić	22 – 14 March 1995	1.80 m (5 ft 11 in)	PEAC-Pécs	(Hungary)
SF	11	Aleksandra Crvendakić	21 – 17 March 1996	1.87 m (6 ft 2 in)	UNIQA Sopron	(Hungary)
SF	12	Maja Škorić	27 – 11 October 1989	1.85 m (6 ft 1 in)	VBW CEKK Ceglèd	(Hungary)
C	14	Dragana Stanković	22 – 18 January 1995	1.95 m (6 ft 5 in)	Hatay Büyükşehir Belediyesi	(Turkey)
PF	15	Tina Jovanović	26 – 12 January 1991	1.90 m (6 ft 3 in)	Aluinvent Miskolc	(Hungary)
SG	23	Ana Dabović	27 – 18 August 1989	1.83 m (6 ft 0 in)	Dynamo Moscow	(Russia)

Head coach

- (Serbia) Stevan Karadžić

Assistant coach(es)

- (Serbia) Igor Polenek

Legend

- Club – describes last
  club before the tournament
- Age – describes age
  on 16 June 2017

=== Slovenia ===
The roster was announced on 15 June 2017.

Slovenia women's national basketball team roster
Players
Coaches
}

Pos.	No.	Name	Age – Date of birth	Height	Club	Ctr.
PG	3	Teja Oblak	26 – 20 December 1990	1.72 m (5 ft 8 in)	Good Angels Košice	(Slovakia)
SG	4	Živa Zdolšek	27 – 10 October 1989	1.78 m (5 ft 10 in)	KK Triglav Kranj	(Slovenia)
SG	5	Maja Erkić	32 – 13 May 1985	1.83 m (6 ft 0 in)	Atomerőmű SE	(Hungary)
SG	6	Annamaria Prezelj	19 – 30 July 1997	1.75 m (5 ft 9 in)	ŽKK Celje	(Slovenia)
SG	7	Rebeka Abramovič	23 – 6 November 1993	1.70 m (5 ft 7 in)	KK Triglav Kranj	(Slovenia)
PG	9	Nika Barič	24 – 2 September 1992	1.69 m (5 ft 7 in)	UMMC Ekaterinburg	(Russia)
SF	10	Tina Jakovina	24 – 11 August 1992	1.82 m (6 ft 0 in)	AS Vicenza	(Italy)
C	11	Sandra Piršič	32 – 25 October 1984	1.95 m (6 ft 5 in)	Atomerőmű SE	(Hungary)
C	12	Eva Lisec	21 – 17 June 1995	1.92 m (6 ft 4 in)	Atomerőmű SE	(Hungary)
PF	13	Tina Trebec	27 – 10 March 1990	1.89 m (6 ft 2 in)	Neftochimic 2010 Burgas	(Bulgaria)
PF	30	Shante Evans	25 – 8 July 1991	1.84 m (6 ft 0 in)	Uni Girona CB	(Spain)
SF	97	Larisa Ocvirk	20 – 26 May 1997	1.87 m (6 ft 2 in)	ŽKK Celje	(Slovenia)

Head coach

- (Slovenia) Damir Grgić

Assistant coach(es)

- (Slovenia) Alojzij Duščak
- (Slovenia) Jure Krajnc

Legend

- Club – describes last
  club before the tournament
- Age – describes age
  on 16 June 2017

== Group D ==
=== Belgium ===
The roster was announced on 15 June 2017.

Belgium women's national basketball team roster
Players
Coaches

Pos.	No.	Name	Age – Date of birth	Height	Club	Ctr.
C	00	Kyara Linskens	20 – 13 November 1996	1.85 m (6 ft 1 in)	BC Namur-Capitale	(Belgium)
SG	5	Kim Mestdagh	27 – 12 March 1990	1.78 m (5 ft 10 in)	Flammes Carolo basket	(France)
SF	6	Antonia Delaere	22 – 1 August 1994	1.80 m (5 ft 11 in)	BC Castors Braine	(Belgium)
PF	8	Sofie Hendrickx	31 – 18 May 1986	1.87 m (6 ft 2 in)	BC Namur-Capitale	(Belgium)
PG	9	Marjorie Carpreaux	29 – 17 September 1987	1.61 m (5 ft 3 in)	Declercq Stortbeton Waregem BC	(Belgium)
C	11	Emma Meesseman	24 – 13 May 1993	1.92 m (6 ft 4 in)	UMMC Ekaterinburg	(Russia)
C	12	Ann Wauters	36 – 12 October 1980	1.94 m (6 ft 4 in)	Abdullah Gül Üniversitesi	(Turkey)
SF	22	Hanne Mestdagh	24 – 19 April 1993	1.78 m (5 ft 10 in)	Eisvögel USC Freiburg	(Germany)
C	23	Serena-Lynn Geldof	20 – 2 March 1997	1.96 m (6 ft 5 in)	Miami Hurricanes	(United States)
PF	32	Heleen Nauwelaers	21 – 14 March 1996	1.80 m (5 ft 11 in)	BC Sint-Katelijne-Waver	(Belgium)
PG	35	Julie Vanloo	24 – 10 February 1993	1.68 m (5 ft 6 in)	Virtus Eirene Ragusa	(Italy)
PF	42	Jana Raman	26 – 15 February 1991	1.87 m (6 ft 2 in)	Kangoeroes Basket Willebroek	(Belgium)

Head coach

- (Belgium) Philip Mestdagh

Assistant coach(es)

- (Belgium) Pierre Cornia

Legend

- Club – describes last
  club before the tournament
- Age – describes age
  on 16 June 2017

=== Latvia ===
The roster was announced on 12 June 2017.

Latvia women's national basketball team roster
Players
Coaches

Pos.	No.	Name	Age – Date of birth	Height	Club	Ctr.
PF	6	Paula Strautmane	20 – 23 March 1997	1.85 m (6 ft 1 in)	Quinnipiac Bobcats	(United States)
PG	7	Elīna Babkina	28 – 24 April 1989	1.72 m (5 ft 8 in)	CD CREF	(Spain)
SF	8	Gunta Baško	37 – 27 April 1980	1.81 m (5 ft 11 in)	TTT Riga	(Latvia)
PF	11	Aija Putniņa	29 – 15 January 1988	1.90 m (6 ft 3 in)	İstanbul Üniversitesi	(Turkey)
PF	12	Anete Šteinberga	27 – 29 January 1990	1.90 m (6 ft 3 in)	USK Praha	(Czech Republic)
C	13	Aija Brumermane	30 – 17 October 1986	1.92 m (6 ft 4 in)	Dunkerque-Malo	(France)
C	14	Anna Dreimane	19 – 4 July 1997	1.97 m (6 ft 6 in)	Colorado State Rams	(United States)
SG	15	Ieva Krastiņa	26 – 22 July 1990	1.72 m (5 ft 8 in)	TTT Riga	(Latvia)
PG	16	Ilze Jākobsone	23 – 19 April 1994	1.68 m (5 ft 6 in)	Vega 1/Liepāja	(Latvia)
C	28	Kristīne Vītola	26 – 2 June 1991	1.96 m (6 ft 5 in)	Galatasaray	(Turkey)
SF	33	Kitija Laksa	21 – 21 May 1996	1.86 m (6 ft 1 in)	South Florida Bulls	(United States)
SG	35	Kate Krēsliņa	21 – 14 April 1996	1.84 m (6 ft 0 in)	Fordham Rams	(United States)

Head coach

- (Latvia) Mārtiņš Zībarts

Assistant coach(es)

- (Latvia) Aigars Nerips
- (Latvia) Artūrs Visockis-Rubenis

Legend

- Club – describes last
  club before the tournament
- Age – describes age
  on 16 June 2017

=== Montenegro ===
Montenegro women's national basketball team roster
Players
Coaches

Pos.	No.	Name	Age – Date of birth	Height	Club
SG	4	Irena Matović	29 – 23 May 1988	1.84 m (6 ft 0 in)	ŽKK Budućnost Podgorica	(Montenegro)
PG	5	Jelena Škerović	36 – 23 December 1980	1.77 m (5 ft 10 in)	Lotos Gdynia	(Poland)
PG	6	Jelena Vučetić	23 – 14 September 1993	1.82 m (6 ft 0 in)	Kazanochka Kazan	(Russia)
C	7	Nataša Popović	35 – 14 April 1982	1.90 m (6 ft 3 in)	Reims Basket Féminin	(France)
SF	8	Milica Milošev	24 – 11 April 1993	1.84 m (6 ft 0 in)	Panthers Osnabrück	(Germany)
PG	9	Snežana Aleksić	28 – 14 January 1989	1.73 m (5 ft 8 in)	CDB Zaragoza	(Spain)
PF	10	Kristina Raković	22 – 26 September 1994	1.85 m (6 ft 1 in)	Valencia Basket	(Spain)
PG	11	Božica Mujović	21 – 7 January 1996	1.76 m (5 ft 9 in)	ŽKK Budućnost Podgorica	(Montenegro)
C	12	Iva Perovanović	33 – 1 September 1983	1.88 m (6 ft 2 in)	Beşiktaş	(Turkey)
SG	13	Jovana Pašić	25 – 12 May 1992	1.83 m (6 ft 0 in)	ICIM Arad	(Romania)
PF	14	Aleksandra Vujović	27 – 14 August 1989	1.89 m (6 ft 2 in)	MBK Doğuş Hastanesi	(Turkey)
C	15	Angel Robinson	30 – 20 April 1987	1.96 m (6 ft 5 in)	Yakın Doğu Üniversitesi	(Turkey)

Head coach

- (Spain) Roberto Íñiguez

Assistant coach(es)

- (Montenegro) Goran Bošković
- (Montenegro) Zoran Kašćelan

Legend

- Club – describes last
  club before the tournament
- Age – describes age
  on 16 June 2017

=== Russia ===
The roster was announced on 13 June 2017.

Russia women's national basketball team roster
Players
Coaches

Pos.	No.	Name	Age – Date of birth	Height	Club	Ctr.
SG	3	Natalya Zhedik	28 – 11 July 1988	1.83 m (6 ft 0 in)	Nadezhda Orenburg	(Russia)
PF	4	Raisa Musina	19 – 31 March 1998	1.92 m (6 ft 4 in)	CCC Polkowice	(Poland)
SG	5	Evgeniya Belyakova	30 – 27 June 1986	1.84 m (6 ft 0 in)	Dynamo Kursk	(Russia)
C	7	Maria Vadeeva	18 – 17 June 1998	1.90 m (6 ft 3 in)	Dynamo Kursk	(Russia)
PG	9	Kseniia Levchenko	21 – 29 March 1996	1.65 m (5 ft 5 in)	Dynamo Kursk	(Russia)
PG	10	Epiphanny Prince	29 – 11 January 1988	1.75 m (5 ft 9 in)	Dynamo Kursk	(Russia)
SG	13	Elena Kirillova	31 – 27 January 1986	1.86 m (6 ft 1 in)	Dynamo Kursk	(Russia)
C	15	Natalia Vieru	27 – 25 July 1989	1.96 m (6 ft 5 in)	UMMC Ekaterinburg	(Russia)
C	16	Ksenia Tikhonenko	24 – 11 January 1993	1.93 m (6 ft 4 in)	Dynamo Moscow	(Russia)
PG	17	Elena Beglova	29 – 1 September 1987	1.76 m (5 ft 9 in)	Nadezhda Orenburg	(Russia)
SF	25	Mariia Cherepanova	29 – 28 August 1987	1.90 m (6 ft 3 in)	UMMC Ekaterinburg	(Russia)
PF	32	Zhosselina Maiga	21 – 30 April 1996	1.93 m (6 ft 4 in)	Nadezhda Orenburg	(Russia)

Head coach

- (Russia) Aleksandr Vasin

Assistant coach(es)

- (Russia) Dmitry Donskov
- (Russia) Anna Arkhipova

Legend

- Club – describes last
  club before the tournament
- Age – describes age
  on 16 June 2017
