= 2014–15 Nemzeti Bajnokság I/A (women's basketball) =

2014–15 Nemzeti Bajnokság I/A season
- League: NB I/A
- Sport: Basketball
- Duration: October 4, 2014 - February 28, 2015 (regular season)
- Number of teams: 10
- TV partner(s): Duna World

Regular season

NB I/A Finals
- Champions: UNIQA-Euroleasing Sopron
- Runners-up: Aluinvent DVTK Miskolc

NB I/A seasons
- ← 2013–14 2015–16 →

The 2014–15 Nemzeti Bajnokság I/A is the 78th season of the Nemzeti Bajnokság I/A, the highest tier professional basketball league in Hungary.

== Team information ==
The following 10 clubs compete in the NB I/A during the 2013–14 season:

| Team | Position 2013-14 | City | Arena | Capacity | Head coach | Kit manufacturer |
|---|---|---|---|---|---|---|
| Ceglédi EKK | 9th | Cegléd | Gál János Sportcsarnok | 1,200 | (Hungary) László Cziczás | |
| Diósgyőri VTK | 4th | Miskolc | Generali Arena | 1,688 | (Spain) Maikel López | Legea |
| UNI Győr | 5th | Győr | Egyetemi Csarnok | 2,500 | (Hungary) Péter Völgyi | Givova |
| MTK | 7th | Budapest | MTK Kosárlabda Csarnok | 500 | (Serbia) Stevan Čupić | Spalding |
| PEAC | 2nd | Pécs | Lauber Dezső Sportcsarnok | 2,791 | (Serbia) Željko Đokić | Spalding |
| PINKK | 1st | Komló | Sportközpont Komló | 1,000 | (Sweden) David Leman | Toti sport |
| Sopron | 3rd | Sopron | MKB Aréna | 1,800 | (Hungary) László Sterbenz | túta |
| KSC Szekszárd | 5th | Szekszárd | Városi Sportcsarnok | 1,200 | (Hungary) Gergely Magyar | Made by club |
| Vasas | 10th | Budapest | Pasaréti Sportcentrum | 300 | (Hungary) Krivacsevics Dragoljub | Toti sport |
| ZTE | 8th | Zalaegerszeg | Városi Sportcsarnok | 2,700 | (Hungary) Tamás Gáll | RECOP |

== Regular season ==
Location of teams in 2014-15 Nemzeti Bajnokság I/A

=== Standings ===
| Pos | Team | Pld | W | L | PF | PA | PD | PCT | Qualification |
|---|---|---|---|---|---|---|---|---|---|
| 1 | UNIQA-Euroleasing Sopron | 18 | 17 | 1 | 1558 | 1236 | +322 | .944 | Playoffs |
| 2 | PEAC-Pécs | 18 | 13 | 5 | 1452 | 1207 | +245 | .722 | Playoffs |
| 3 | Aluinvent DVTK Miskolc | 18 | 12 | 6 | 1422 | 1185 | +237 | .667 | Playoffs |
| 4 | CMB Cargo UNI Győr | 18 | 12 | 6 | 1380 | 1219 | +161 | .667 | Playoffs |
| 5 | PINKK-Pécsi 424 | 18 | 11 | 7 | 1363 | 1243 | +120 | .611 | Playoffs |
| 6 | Zala Volán | 18 | 10 | 8 | 1389 | 1384 | +5 | .556 | Playoffs |
| 7 | Atomerőmű-KSC Szekszárd | 18 | 6 | 12 | 1186 | 1444 | −258 | .333 | Playoffs |
| 8 | Ceglédi EKK | 18 | 6 | 12 | 1272 | 1396 | −124 | .333 | Playoffs |
| 9 | MTK-Budapest | 18 | 3 | 15 | 1229 | 1458 | −229 | .167 | Play-out |
| 10 | MKB-Euroleagsing Vasas | 18 | 0 | 18 | 981 | 1460 | −479 | .000 | Play-out |

Updated to match(es) played on 28 February 2015. Source: Kosarsport.hu

=== Results ===
| Home \ Away | CEKK | DVTK | GYŐR | MTK | PEAC | PINKK | SOP | SZE | VAS | ZTE |
|---|---|---|---|---|---|---|---|---|---|---|
| Ceglédi EKK | | 77–82 | 66–74 | 83–74 | 53–75 | 64–75 | 64–94 | 74–85 | 88–44 | 88–82 |
| Diósgyőri VTK | 80–87 | | 62–66 | 77–47 | 76–71 | 71–55 | 70–77 | 91–67 | 93–46 | 90–72 |
| UNI Győr | 76–54 | 59–71 | | 78–84 | 78–68 | 74–62 | 74–86 | 98–67 | 86–52 | 86–91 |
| MTK-Budapest | 81–83 | 56–94 | 56–70 | | 81–97 | 95–103 | 68–94 | 73–82 | 77–56 | 70–79 |
| PEAC-Pécs | 73–61 | 78–74 | 75–85 | 94–70 | | 86–58 | 71–79 | 77–54 | 90–52 | 102–80 |
| PINKK-Pécsi 424 | 96–58 | 69–64 | 48–59 | 63–50 | 65–74 | | 73–83 | 92–66 | 86–60 | 70–64 |
| UNIQA-Euroleasing Sopron | 86–56 | 99–78 | 76–69 | 97–75 | 81–88 | 85–76 | | 84–49 | 80–62 | 105–67 |
| KSC Szekszárd | 80–75 | 44–77 | 65–92 | 79–56 | 52–87 | 55–91 | 66–94 | | 77–49 | 71–90 |
| Vasas | 65–74 | 53–105 | 57–82 | 50–58 | 42–82 | 62–80 | 51–69 | 61–64 | | 51–79 |
| Zala Volán | 74–67 | 62–67 | 79–74 | 79–58 | 66–64 | 73–101 | 79–89 | 83–63 | 90–68 | |

Legend: Blue = home team win; Yellow = draw; Red = away team win.

== Playoffs ==
Teams in bold won the playoff series. Numbers to the left of each team indicate the team's original playoff seeding. Numbers to the right indicate the score of each playoff game.

Quarterfinals
1 | **UNIQA-Euroleasing Sopron** | **88** | **78**
8 | Ceglédi EKK | 49 | 53
4 | **CMB Cargo UNI Győr** | 69 | **60** | **66**
5 | PINKK-Pécsi 424 | **78** | 47 | 57
2 | **PEAC-Pécs** | **67** | 67 | **84**
7 | Atomerőmű-KSC Szekszárd | 61 | **68** | 61
3 | **Aluinvent DVTK Miskolc** | **93** | **94**
6 | Zala Volán | 70 | 56

Semifinals
1 | **UNIQA-Euroleasing Sopron** | **106** | **81**
4 | CMB Cargo UNI Győr | 53 | 61
2 | PEAC-Pécs | **78** | 70 | 72
3 | **Aluinvent DVTK Miskolc** | 74 | **76** | **76**

Final
1 | **UNIQA-Euroleasing Sopron** | **77** | 86 | **75** | **62**
3 | Aluinvent DVTK Miskolc | 74 | **90** | 67 | 60
Third place
2 | PEAC-Pécs | 61 | **68** | 76
4 | **CMB Cargo UNI Győr** | **74** | 62 | **79**

NB I/A 2014–15
Champions
**UNIQA-Euroleasing Sopron**
**9th title**

Team roster

- (United States) Kayla McBride
- Orsolya Zsovár
- Zsófia Simon
- Tijana Krivačević
- Sara Krnjić
- Zsófia Licskai
- (Croatia) Iva Ciglar
- Patrícia Bakó
- Fanni Kocsis
- Enikő Kuttor
- Virág Weninger
- (Bosnia and Herzegovina) Dragana Stanković
- (Serbia) Aleksandra Crvendakić
- (United States) Kimberleyanne Gaucher
- (United States) Bria Hartley

Head coach: László Sterbenz

=== 5th – 8th placement ===
Teams in bold won the playoff series. Numbers to the left of each team indicate the team's original playoff seeding. Numbers to the right indicate the score of each playoff game.

5th–8th placement semifinals
5 | **PINKK-Pécsi 424** | **75** | **63**
8 | Ceglédi EKK | 68 | 52
6 | **Zala Volán** | **86** | 67 | **81**
7 | Atomerőmű-KSC Szekszárd | 63 | **84** | 71

5th place match
5 | **PINKK-Pécsi 424** | **88** | **75**
6 | Zala Volán | 67 | 69
7th place match
7 | Atomerőmű-KSC Szekszárd | **70** | 69 | 82
8 | **Ceglédi EKK** | 65 | **72** | **86**

== Play-out ==
9th placed team hosted Games 1 and, plus Game 3 if necessary. 10th placed team hosted Game 2.

| 9th placed team | Agg. | 10th placed team | 1st leg | 2nd leg | 3rd leg |
|---|---|---|---|---|---|
| MTK-Budapest | 1–2 | MKB-Euroleagsing Vasas | 77–65 | 57–67 | 67–75 |

== Number of teams by counties ==
| | County (megye) | No. teams | Teams |
|---|---|---|---|
| 1 | Baranya | 2 | PEAC and PINKK-Pécsi 424 |
| 1 | Budapest | 2 | MTK and Vasas |
| 1 | Győr-Moson-Sopron | 2 | UNI Győr and Sopron |
| 4 | Borsod-Abaúj-Zemplén | 1 | Diósgyőri VTK |
| 4 | Pest | 1 | Cegléd |
| 4 | Tolna | 1 | Szekszárd |
| 4 | Zala | 1 | Zala Volán |
