= 2013–14 Nemzeti Bajnokság I/A (women's basketball) =

2013–14 Nemzeti Bajnokság I/A season
- League: NB I/A
- Sport: Basketball
- Duration: October 4, 2013 - April 7, 2014 (regular season)
- Teams: 10
- TV partner: Digi Sport (Romania)

Középszakasz
- Season champions: Diósgyőri VTK

Playoffs

NB I/A seasons
- ← 2012–13 2014–15 →

The 2013–14 Nemzeti Bajnokság I/A is the 77th season of the Nemzeti Bajnokság I/A, the highest tier professional basketball league in Hungary.

== Team information ==
The following 13 clubs compete in the NB I/A during the 2013–14 season:

| Team | Position 2012-13 | City | Arena | Capacity | Head coach |
|---|---|---|---|---|---|
| Diósgyőri VTK | 4th | Miskolc | Generali Arena | 1,488 | (Hungary) Ákos Peresztegi-Nagy |
| Ceglédi EKK | 8th | Cegléd | Városi Sportcsarnok | 1,200 | (Hungary) Áron Balászné Katalin |
| KSC Szekszárd | 7th | Szekszárd | Városi Sportcsarnok | 1,100 | (Hungary) Gergely Magyar |
| MTK | 1st (NB I/B) | Budapest | BSE Kosárlabda Csarnok | 500 | (Serbia) Stevan Čupić |
| PEAC | 5th | Pécs | Lauber Dezső Sportcsarnok | 3,000 | (Serbia) Željko Đokić |
| PINKK | 3rd | Komló | Városi Sportcsarnok | 800 | (Spain) Roberto Hernández |
| Sopron | 1st | Sopron | MKB Aréna | 1,316 | (Serbia) Igor Polenek |
| UNI Győr | 2nd | Győr | Győr Városi Egyetemi Csarnok | 3,000 | (Hungary) Tamás Bencze |
| Vasas | 10th | Budapest | Pasaréti Sportcentrum | 300 | (Hungary) Éva Diósadi Deák |
| ZTE | 6th | Zalaegerszeg | Városi Sportcsarnok | 2,500 | (Hungary) József Tuboly |

== Alapszakasz ==
=== 1st tour ===
| Rank | Team | MP | W | L | PF | PA | PCT | Qualification |
|---|---|---|---|---|---|---|---|---|
| 1. | Atomerőmű KSC Szekszárd | 6 | 4 | 2 | 425 | 423 | .667 | Qualified for 2nd tour |
| 2. | ZTE NKK | 6 | 4 | 2 | 414 | 382 | .667 | Qualified for 2nd tour |
| 3. | MTK-Budapest | 6 | 3 | 3 | 434 | 406 | .500 | Qualified for 2nd tour |
| 4. | MKB Euroleasing Vasas | 6 | 1 | 5 | 339 | 401 | .167 | Qualified for 2nd tour |

=== 2nd tour ===
| Rank | Team | MP | W | L | PF | PA | PCT | Qualification |
|---|---|---|---|---|---|---|---|---|
| 1. | HAT AGRO UNI Győr | 8 | 8 | 0 | 663 | 447 | 1.000 | Qualified for 3rd tour |
| 2. | Atomerőmű KSC Szekszárd | 8 | 5 | 3 | 558 | 588 | .625 | Qualified for 3rd tour |
| 3. | ZTE NKK | 8 | 3 | 5 | 477 | 508 | .375 | Qualified for 3rd tour |
| 4. | MTK-Budapest | 8 | 3 | 5 | 500 | 521 | .375 | Qualified for 3rd tour |
| 5. | MKB Euroleasing Vasas | 8 | 1 | 7 | 440 | 574 | .125 | Qualified for 3rd tour |

== Középszakasz ==
Locations of the 2013–14 Nemzeti Bajnokság I/A

=== Standings ===
| | Team | Pld | W | L | PF | PA | PCT |
|---|---|---|---|---|---|---|---|
| 1. | Aluinvent DVTK Miskolc | 18 | 15 | 3 | 1387 | 1020 | .920 |
| 2. | UNIQA Euroleasing Sopron | 18 | 15 | 3 | 1448 | 1063 | .833 |
| 3. | PEAC-Pécs | 18 | 14 | 4 | 1300 | 1054 | .778 |
| 4. | PINKK-Pécsi 424 | 18 | 14 | 4 | 1370 | 1007 | .778 |
| 5. | HAT AGRO UNI Győr | 18 | 11 | 7 | 1313 | 1165 | .467 |
| 6. | Atomerőmű KSC Szekszárd | 18 | 6 | 12 | 1156 | 1439 | .333 |
| 7. | ZTE NKK | 18 | 5 | 13 | 1098 | 1317 | .278 |
| 8. | MTK-Budapest | 18 | 4 | 14 | 1105 | 1299 | .222 |
| 9. | Ceglédi EKK | 18 | 4 | 14 | 1078 | 1421 | .222 |
| 10. | MKB Euroleasing Vasas | 18 | 2 | 16 | 876 | 1346 | .111 |

| Qualified for the Playoffs |
| Relegation playoff |

Pld – Played; W – Won; L – Lost; PF – Points for; PA – Points against; Diff – Difference; Pts – Points.

== Playoffs ==
Teams in bold won the playoff series. Numbers to the left of each team indicate the team's original playoff seeding. Numbers to the right indicate the score of each playoff game.

Quarterfinals
1 | **Aluinvent DVTK Miskolc** | **90** | **80**
8 | MTK-Budapest | 62 | 49
4 | **PINKK-Pécsi 424** | **78** | **61**
5 | HAT AGRO UNI Győr | 52 | 44
2 | **UNIQA Euroleasing Sopron** | **110** | **74**
7 | ZTE NKK | 60 | 57
3 | **PEAC-Pécs** | **72** | **81**
6 | Atomerőmű KSC Szekszárd | 57 | 54

Semifinals
1 | Aluinvent DVTK Miskolc | 53 | 54
4 | **PINKK-Pécsi 424** | **62** | **70**
2 | UNIQA Euroleasing Sopron | **76** | 74 | 55
3 | **PEAC-Pécs** | 45 | **75** | **56**

Finals
4 | **PINKK-Pécsi 424** | 72 | **72** | 69 | **52** | **54**
3 | PEAC-Pécs | **78** | 54 | **80** | 38 | 42
Bronze Medal Match
1 | Aluinvent DVTK Miskolc | 67 | 66
2 | **UNIQA Euroleasing Sopron** | **79** | **75**

NB I/A 2013–14
Champions

**PINKK-Pécsi 424**
**1st Title**

Team roster

4 Györgyi Őri, 6 Nóra Angerné Kováts, 7 Fruzsina Erős, 8 Dalma Iványi, 9 Daphanie Kennedy, 10 Lilla Adamecz, 12 Nóra Ruják, 13 Szidónia Katona, 20 Lucila Pascua, 21 Dorottya Győri, 22 Louella Tomlinson, 33 Nikolett Sarok and 45 Amber Holt
Head coach: Roberto Hernández

== 5–8 places ==
Semifinals
HAT AGRO UNI Győr | 75 | 72
MTK-Budapest | 66 | 70
Atomerőmű KSC Szekszárd | 73 | 63 | 87
ZTE NKK | 68 | 73 | 57

Finals
HAT AGRO UNI Győr | 52 | 65
Atomerőmű KSC Szekszárd | 60 | 77
Seventh place
MTK-Budapest | 85 | 83
ZTE NKK | 75 | 69
