= 2012 FIBA Europe Under-20 Championship for Women Division B =

FIBA Europe Under-20 Championship for women

Tournament details
- Host country: Czech Republic
- City: Klatovy
- Dates: 16–26 August 2012
- Teams: 9 (from 1 confederation)
- Venue: 1 (in 1 host city)

Final positions
- Champions: Greece (1st title)
- Runners-up: Germany
- Third place: Hungary

Official website
- www.fibaeurope.com

The 2012 FIBA Europe Under-20 Championship for Women Division B was the eighth edition of the Division B of the Women's European basketball championship for national under-20 teams. It was held in Klatovy, Czech Republic, from 16 to 26 August 2012. Greece women's national under-20 basketball team won the tournament.

== Participating teams ==
- Belgium
- Bulgaria
- Czech Republic
- Germany ▼ (15th place, 2011 FIBA Europe Under-20 Championship for Women Division A)
- Greece
- Hungary
- Israel
- Romania ▼ (16th place, 2011 FIBA Europe Under-20 Championship for Women Division A)
- Switzerland

== Final standings ==
Pos	Team	Pld	W	L	PF	PA	PD	Pts	Promotion
1	Greece	8	7	1	516	430	+86	15	2013 FIBA Europe Under-20 Championship for Women Division A
2	Germany	8	6	2	612	509	+103	14	2013 FIBA Europe Under-20 Championship for Women Division A
3	Hungary	8	6	2	487	434	+53	14	2013 FIBA Europe Under-20 Championship for Women Division A
4	Romania	8	4	4	506	588	−82	12	
5	Czech Republic	8	4	4	541	501	+40	12	
6	Israel	8	3	5	540	573	−33	11	
7	Belgium	8	3	5	504	498	+6	11	
8	Switzerland	8	2	6	403	535	−132	10	
9	Bulgaria	8	1	7	480	521	−41	9	

Source: FIBA Archive

== Results ==
16 August 2012

Boxscore

Germany	95–66	Romania

16 August 2012

Boxscore

Greece	55–48	Bulgaria

16 August 2012

Boxscore

Belgium	60–66	Czech Republic

16 August 2012

Boxscore

Israel	64–70	Hungary

17 August 2012

Boxscore

Czech Republic	77–60	Israel

17 August 2012

Boxscore

Bulgaria	51–75	Belgium

17 August 2012

Boxscore

Romania	35–67	Greece

17 August 2012

Boxscore

Switzerland	52–91	Germany

18 August 2012

Boxscore

Greece	81–39	Switzerland

18 August 2012

Boxscore

Belgium	68–76	Romania

18 August 2012

Boxscore

Israel	73–64	Bulgaria

18 August 2012

Boxscore

Hungary	56–55	Czech Republic

20 August 2012

Boxscore

Bulgaria	38–41	Hungary

20 August 2012

Boxscore

Romania	80–73	Israel

20 August 2012

Boxscore

Switzerland	59–64	Belgium

20 August 2012

Boxscore

Germany	41–48	Greece

21 August 2012

Boxscore

Belgium	68–58	Germany

21 August 2012

Boxscore

Israel	57–61	Switzerland

21 August 2012

Boxscore

Hungary	73–51	Romania

21 August 2012

Boxscore

Czech Republic	69–64	Bulgaria

22 August 2012

Boxscore

Romania	68–65	Czech Republic

22 August 2012

Boxscore

Switzerland	47–59	Hungary

22 August 2012

Boxscore

Germany	93–73	Israel

22 August 2012

Boxscore

Greece	64–63	Belgium

24 August 2012

Boxscore

Israel	72–63	Greece

24 August 2012

Boxscore

Hungary	71–76	Germany

24 August 2012

Boxscore

Czech Republic	71–42	Switzerland

24 August 2012

Boxscore

Bulgaria	82–87	Romania

25 August 2012

Boxscore

Switzerland	38–69	Bulgaria

25 August 2012

Boxscore

Germany	75–67	Czech Republic

25 August 2012

Boxscore

Greece	62–61	Hungary

25 August 2012

Boxscore

Belgium	65–68	Israel

26 August 2012

Boxscore

Hungary	56–41	Belgium

26 August 2012

Boxscore

Czech Republic	71–76	Greece

26 August 2012

Boxscore

Bulgaria	64–83	Germany

26 August 2012

Boxscore

Romania	43–65	Switzerland
