= Tarbes Gespe Bigorre =

Tarbes
- League: La Boulangère Wonderligue
- Founded: 1983
- Arena: Tarbes, Palais des Sports (capacity: 1,650)
- Location: Tarbes, France
- Team colors: Purple and White
- President: (France) Carmelo Scarna
- Head coach: (France) Francois Gomez
Home	Away

Tarbes Gespe Bigorre (often called Tarbes GB or TGB) is a French women's basketball club, taking part to the professional French league for women, the LFB, and to European Cups (now EuroLeague Women). It is the most important club sport in the town of Tarbes, a 60,000 inhabitants town in the southwest part of France.

== Prize winners ==
- 1 Ronchetti Cup: 1996 (Runner-up in 2002)
- 1 French championship: 2010 (Runner-up in 1993, 1995, 2003, 2018, 2025)
- 3 French Cups: 1996, 1997, 1998 (Runner-up in 2009, 2010)
- 1 Tournoi de la Fédération: 1995 (Runner-up in 1996, 1997)

== Players ==
=== Current roster ===
Note: Flags indicate national team eligibility at FIBA-sanctioned events. Players may hold other non-FIBA nationalities not displayed.

Tarbes Gespe Bigorre roster
Players
Coaches

Pos.	No.	Nat.	Name	Ht.	Age
SG	6	(France)	Kessler, Serena	1.80 m (5 ft 11 in)	23 – 25 October 2002
G/F	7	(France)	Droguet, Camille	1.78 m (5 ft 10 in)	27 – 15 June 1999
SG	8	(France)	Strunc, Isabelle	1.78 m (5 ft 10 in)	34 – 3 August 1991
G	9	(France)	Monasse, Lena	1.74 m (5 ft 9 in)	21 – 12 September 2004
C	11	(Nigeria)	Musa, Murjanatu	1.88 m (6 ft 2 in)	26 – 5 May 2000
C	13	(France)	Zodia, Jess-Mine	1.90 m (6 ft 3 in)	21 – 22 December 2004
F	14	(Cameroon)	Ewodo, Marina	1.88 m (6 ft 2 in)	28 – 24 June 1998
PF	17	(Slovenia)	Sivka, Ajša	1.90 m (6 ft 3 in)	20 – 23 November 2005
G	21	(United States)	Barahman, Roxy	1.73 m (5 ft 8 in)	28 – 5 June 1998
G	25	(Switzerland)	Fora, Nancy	1.76 m (5 ft 9 in)	28 – 17 September 1997
PF	77	(France)	Miyem, Endéné	1.88 m (6 ft 2 in)	38 – 15 May 1988

Head coach

- (France) Francois Gomez

Assistant coach(es)

- (France) Lionel Oustry
- (France) Isabelle Yacoubou

Legend

- (C) Team captain
- Injured

- Roster
Updated: 17 September 2024

=== Famous players ===
- (France) Catherine Melain
- (France) Corinne Zago-Esquirol
- (France) Christine Gomis
- (France) Corinne Benintendi
- (France) Lætitia Moussard
- (France) Céline Dumerc
- (France) Émilie Gomis
- (France) Tima Pouye
- (United States) Teresa Edwards
- (United States) Dawn Staley
- (United States) Daedra Charles
- (United States) Andrea Stinson
- (United States) Vickie Johnson
- (United States) Alexis Prince
- (Bulgaria) Polina Tzekova
- (Hungary) Judith Balogh
- (United States) Bridget Cody
- (Bulgaria) Sonia Dragomirova
- (Slovakia) Andrea Kuklová
- (Australia) Jo Hill
- (Australia) Jennifer Whittle
- (Australia) Carla Porter-Boyd

=== Successive coaches ===
- (France) Jean-Pierre Siutat
- (France) Damien Leyrolles
- (Russia) Igor Grudin
- (France) José Ruiz
- (France) Pascal Pisan
- (France) Patrick Maucouvert
- (France) François Gomez
