= Maja Vučurović =

Serbian basketball player

No. 12 – CAB Estepona
- Position: Power Forward
- League: Bundesliga; EuroCup

Personal information
- Born: 27 May 1991 (age 35) Senta, SFR Yugoslavia
- Listed height: 1.88 m (6 ft 2 in)
- Listed weight: 75 kg (165 lb)

Career information
- WNBA draft: 2013: undrafted
- Playing career: 2007–2022.

Career history
- 2007–2009: Radivoj Korać
- 2009–2011: Wisla Can Pack
- WBC Celta Vigo
- Alexandria
- 2012–2014: Waregem
- 2014–2015: USO Mondeville
- 2015: Dep. Santa Maria
- 2015–2016: Žabiny Brno
- 2016–present: Stars Keltern
- 2018-2019: Araski
- 2019-2020: Campus Promete
- 2020-2021: Celta Vigo
- 2021-2022: CAB Estepona

Maja Vučurović (Serbian Cyrillic: Маја Вучуровић; born 27 May 1991) is a Serbian professional basketball player. Maja plays for Stars Keltern in the Bundesliga and EuroCup.
