= Isabelle Strunc =

French basketball player

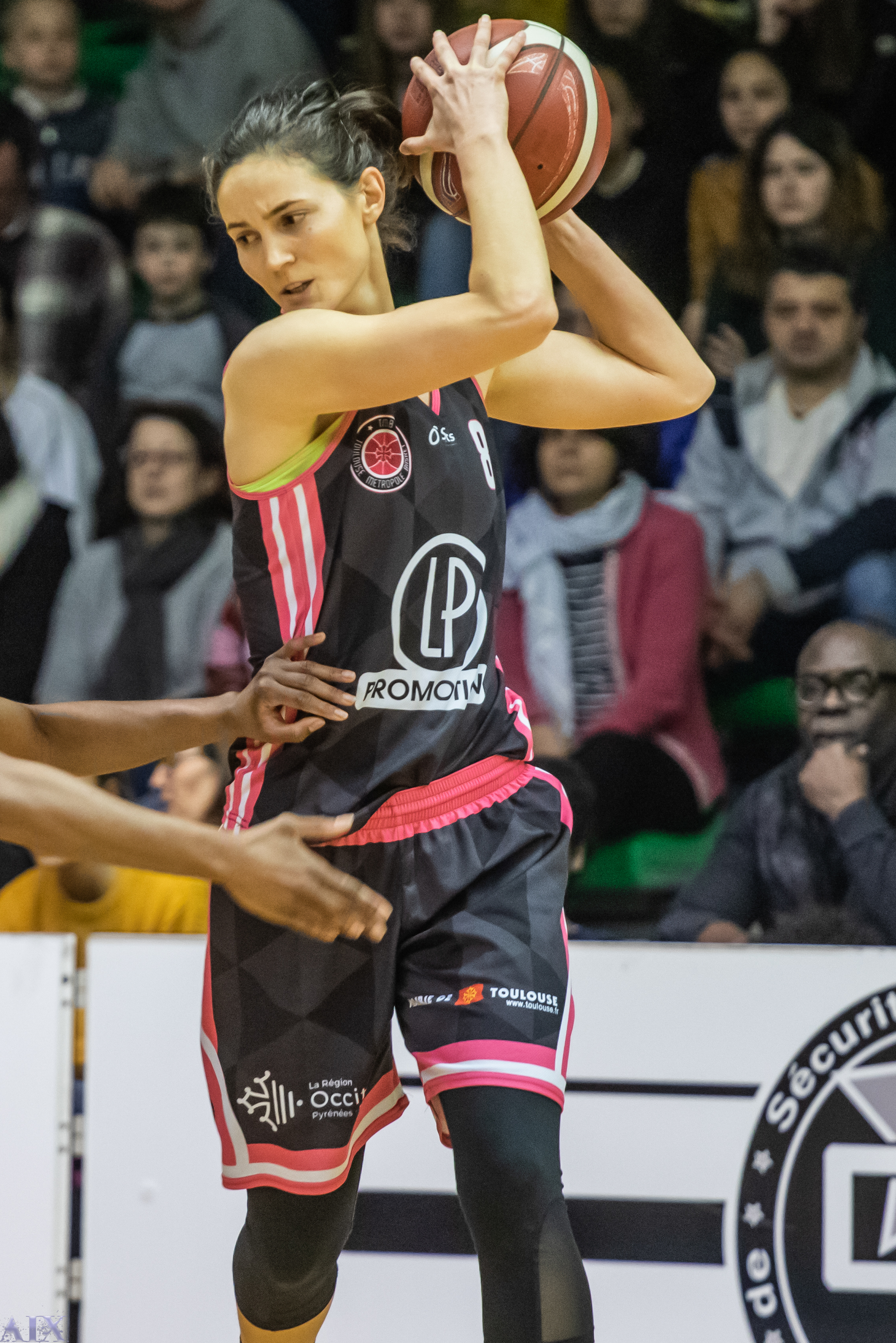

Tarbes Gespe Bigorre
- Position: Guard
- League: Ligue Féminine de Basketball

Personal information
- Born: 8 March 1991 (age 35) Roubaix, France
- Listed height: 5 ft 11 in (1.80 m)

Career information
- WNBA draft: 2013: undrafted
- Playing career: 2006–present

Career history
- 2006–2009: Centre Fédéral
- 2009–2011: Pays d'Aix Basket
- 2011–2013: Perpignan Basket
- 2013–2014: Canberra Capitals
- 2014–2018: Cavigal Nice Basket
- 2018–2024: Toulouse Métropole Basket
- 2024–present: Tarbes Gespe Bigorre

Career highlights
- 2x Ligue Féminine 2 Champion (2012, 2015)

Isabelle Strunc (born 8 March 1991) is a French professional basketball player.

== Career ==
=== Ligue Féminine ===
Strunc began her professional career in France's Ligue Féminine de Basketball, with Centre Fédéral, a team run by the FFBB to develop future national talents. She then moved to Pays d'Aix Basket for two seasons, followed by Perpignan Basket for another two seasons. After a year away in Australia, Strunc returned to LFB with Cavigal Nice Basket. She has won Ligue Féminine 2 on two occasions, acting instrumental in the promotions of Perpignan (2012) and Nice (2015).

=== Australia ===
In 2013, Strunc was signed by the Canberra Capitals in the Women's National Basketball League. Abby Bishop, former teammate at Perpignan Basket, was instrumental in her signing.

== National team ==
Strunc made her international debut with the French national team at the 2007 FIBA Europe Under-16 Championship. She has medalled for France on two occasions.She made her world championship debut when she played at the 2009 FIBA Under-19 World Championship in Thailand; France placed 7th.
