= Svenja Brunckhorst =

German basketball player (born 1991)

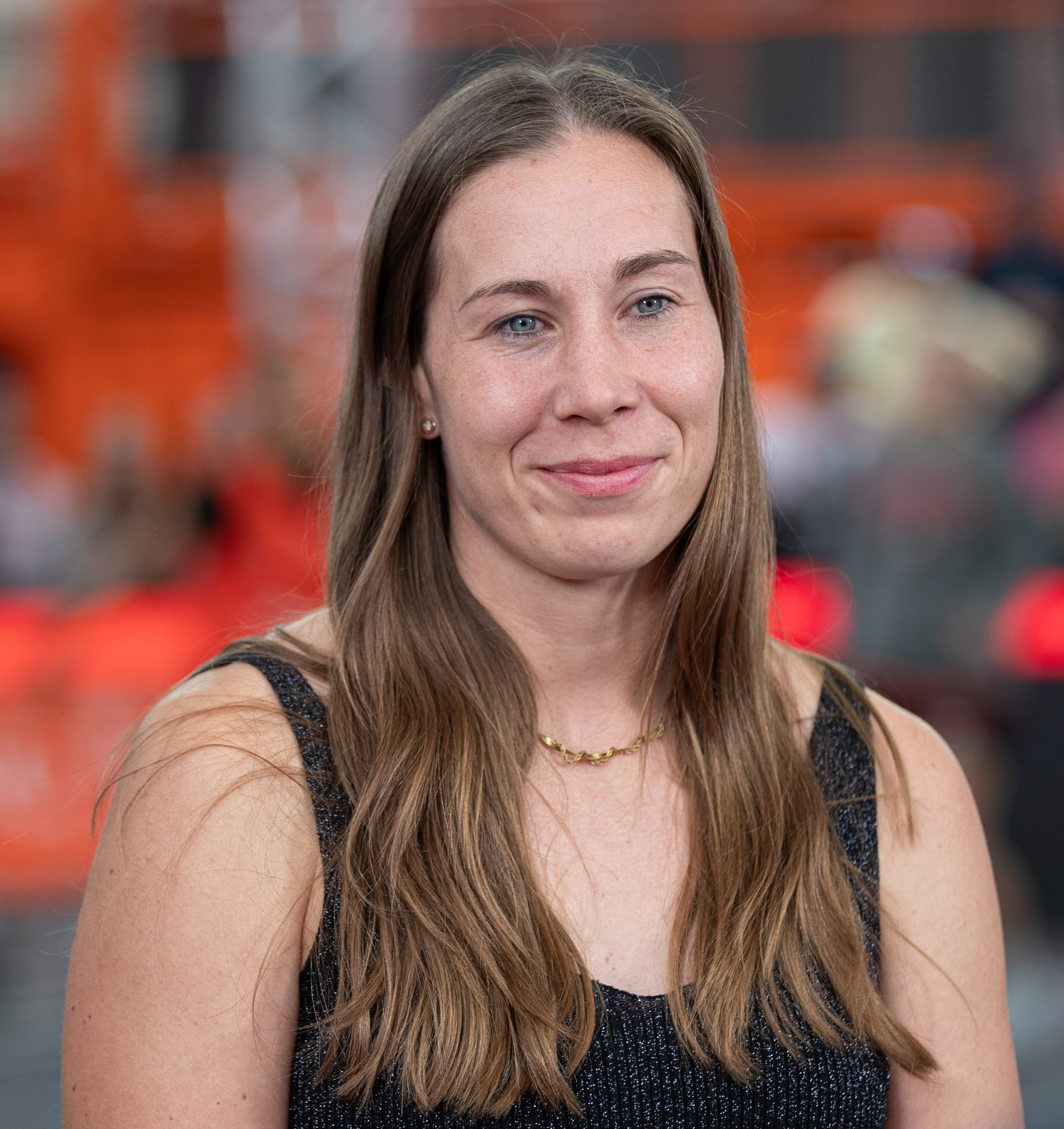
- Brunckhorst in 2025

Personal information
- Born: 19 October 1991 (age 35) Rotenburg an der Wümme, Lower Saxony, Germany
- Listed height: 1.79 m (5 ft 10 in)
Medals
Women's 3x3 basketball
Representing Germany
Olympic Games
Gold medal – first place	2024 Paris	Team
Europe Cup
Silver medal – second place	2021 Paris

Svenja Brunckhorst (born 19 October 1991) is a German basketball player.

== Career and personal life ==
She represented Germany at the 2024 Summer Olympics in the 3x3 event. .
