= Dita Rozenberga =

Latvian basketball player

Dita Veršakova
No. 5 – TTT Rīga
- Position: Small forward
- League: LSBL

Personal information
- Born: 22 December 1992 (age 33) Tukums, Latvia
- Listed height: 6 ft 4 in (1.93 m)
- Listed weight: 176 lb (80 kg)

Career information
- WNBA draft: 2014: undrafted

Dita Rozenberga (born 22 December 1992) is a Latvian basketball player who was a member of TTT Rīga and the Latvian national team.

She participated at the 2018 FIBA Women's Basketball World Cup.
