= Chatilla van Grinsven =

Dutch basketball player (born 1991)

Free agent
- Position: Power forward

Personal information
- Born: 23 February 1991 (age 35) Eindhoven, Netherlands
- Listed height: 1.90 m (6 ft 3 in)
- Listed weight: 79 kg (174 lb)

Career information
- College: Colorado State (2008–2011); Saint Joseph (2011–2013)
- WNBA draft: 2013: undrafted
- Playing career: 2007–present

Career history
- 2013–2014: Bourges
- 2014–2015: Ormanspor
- 2015–2016: Arras Pays d'Artois
- 2016–2017: Osmaniye
- 2017: Galatasaray
- 2017–2018: PF Broni 93
- 2018–2019: Uni Ferrol
- 2019–2020: KP Brno

Career highlights
- Coupe de France winner (2014); First-team All-Atlantic 10 (2013)

Chatilla van Grinsven (born 23 February 1991) is a Dutch basketball player who is a member of the Dutch national team. She played college basketball for Colorado State and Saint Joseph before playing professionally in Europe.

== College career ==
In 2008 she signed her athletic-scholarship in the United States to play for Colorado State University. During her first season, she was forced by the NCAA to sit out four games for having played on a team in Netherlands which had professional players prior to her arrival to CSU. She averaged 4.1 points and 3.1 rebounds as a freshman and 12.0 points and 6.1 rebounds as a sophomore. In January 2011, she asked and received a release from her scholarship.

In 2011, van Grinsven transferred to Saint Joseph's University to play for the Hawks in Philadelphia, where she had to sit out the 2011–2012 season due to NCAA transfer rules. Living in Philadelphia, van Grinsven became an active member of the “Heart of a Hawk” service program, where she dedicated her free time to the Children's Hospital of Philadelphia while also serving food to the homeless people with the help of several local non-profit-organizations. In May 2012, van Grinsven was awarded the Roosevelt Hunter Community Service Award.

In 2012, van Grinsven became eligible to play for Saint Joseph's University and marked the 2012–2013 season as a distinguished year for her and the team (15ppg and 10.5rpg). Van Grinsven led her team to the Atlantic-10 championship and the NCAA tournament appearance for the first time in 10 years, while accumulating numerous honours throughout her season such as the A-10 First Team All Conference, A-10 All Championship Team, Big-5 Player of the Year, scoring her 1000th career point, while winning the NCAA Woman of the Year winner award in the A-10 Conference. Van Grinsven was also nominated as the NCAA Woman of the Year Award in the United States; awarding her distinctive performance in the class-room, on the basketball court, and her service in the community. In May 2013, van Grinsven graduated with a bachelor's degree in International Business with a focus in Economics.

=== Colorado State and Saint Joseph's statistics ===
Legend
| GP | Games played | GS | Games started | MPG | Minutes per game |
| FG% | Field goal percentage | 3P% | 3-point field goal percentage | FT% | Free throw percentage |
| RPG | Rebounds per game | APG | Assists per game | SPG | Steals per game |
| BPG | Blocks per game | PPG | Points per game | **Bold** | Career high |

| Year | Team | GP | Points | FG% | 3P% | FT% | RPG | APG | SPG | BPG | PPG |
|---|---|---|---|---|---|---|---|---|---|---|---|
| 2008-09 | Colorado State | 24 | 98 | 31.7% | 0.0% | 68.8% | 3.3 | 0.4 | 0.3 | 0.3 | 4.1 |
| 2009-10 | Colorado State | 30 | 360 | 40.4% | 27.3% | 70.0% | 6.1 | 1.2 | 0.8 | 0.7 | 12.0 |
| 2010-11 | Colorado State | 15 | 159 | 41.4% | **33.3%** | **77.4%** | 6.4 | 1.3 | 0.9 | 0.5 | 10.6 |
| 2011-12 | Saint Joseph's | sat due to NCAA transfer rules | | | | | | | | | |
| 2012-13 | Saint Joseph's | **32** | **476** | **42.4%** | 16.7% | 72.9% | **10.4** | **1.5** | **1.3** | **1.5** | **14.9** |
| Career | | 101 | 1093 | 40.4% | 77.3% | 20.3% | 2.9 | 1.1 | 0.8 | 0.8 | 10.8 |

== Professional career ==
After going undrafted in the 2013 WNBA draft, van Grinsven signed a training camp contract with the Connecticut Sun. In the winter of 2013, she signed her first European professional contract with the reigning French Ligue Féminine champions Bourges Basket where she won the Coupe de France and reached the Final Four of the FIBA EuroLeague.

In 2014, van Grinsven signed with the Turkish League club Ormanspor in Ankara and in 2015 she moved to the French Premier League club in Arras, becoming a prominent player in the French League with her rebounding skills (9.5rpg) and scoring capacity (13.5ppg). In 2016 she played for the Turkish Premier League team Osmaniye, and in 2017 returned to Turkey with Euroleague powerhouse Galatasaray in Istanbul.

In 2018, van Grinsven signed with Uni Ferrol of the Spanish Liga Femenina de Baloncesto where she was a prominent player for the team in scoring and rebounding. In season 2019–2020, she played for EuroCup team KP Brno in the Czech Republic, her 14th year as a professional athlete.

Due to the COVID-19 outbreak in Europe, she decided to sit out the 2020–21 season.

== National team career ==
van Grinsven has been a member of the Dutch National team program since 2006, and was selected to the Dutch senior team in 2010.

== Personal life ==
In 2021, she appeared in the television show De Verraders. She reached the final and became co-winner with Samantha Steenwijk.
