= Zsófia Varga =

Hungarian basketball player

No. 5 – UNI Győr
- Position: Small forward
- League: NB I/A

Personal information
- Born: January 15, 1989 (age 37) Ajka, Hungary
- Listed height: 6 ft 0 in (1.83 m)

Zsófia Varga (born January 15, 1989) is a Hungarian basketball player for UNI Győr and the Hungarian national team.

She participated at the EuroBasket Women 2017.
