= Amaya Gastaminza =

Spanish basketball player

Hondarribia-Irún
- Position: Small forward
- League: Liga Femenina de Baloncesto

Personal information
- Born: 27 February 1991 (age 35) Pamplona, Spain
- Listed height: 1.89 m (6 ft 2 in)
- Listed weight: 75 kg (165 lb)

Career history
- 2010–2011: Avenida
- 2011–2012: Hondarribia-Irún
- 2012–2013: Ciudad de Burgos
- 2013–2014: Conquero
- 2014–2015: Gran Canaria
- 2015: Peñarol Mar del Plata
- 2015–: Promete
Medals
Women's basketball
Representing Spain
FIBA Under-19 World Championship for Women
Silver medal – second place	2009 Thailand	National Team
FIBA Europe Under-20 Championship
Gold medal – first place	2012 Serbia	National Team
Silver medal – second place	2011 Latvia	National Team
FIBA Europe Under-18 Championship
Gold medal – first place	2007 Sweden	National Team
FIBA Europe Under-16 Championship
Silver medal – second place	2007 Latvia	National Team

Amaya Gastaminza Ganuza (born 27 February 1991) is a Spanish professional basketball player. She plays for Hondarribia-Irún and Spain women's national basketball team. She has represented several junior teams in European competitions. She won EuroLeague Women 2010–11 with Perfumerías Avenida Baloncesto.
