= Princesse Goubo =

French basketball player

Princesse Goubo (born 15 April 1991 in Amiens, France) is a professional basketball player.

She played for Valenciennes in the 2009–2009 season and Arras the following season, both in the senior league, the Ligue Féminine de Basketball. In 2010, she joined Perpignan in the second-tier league LF2.
