= Pavla Švrdlíková =

Czech basketball player

No. 14 – BK Handicap Brno
- Position: Power forward
- League: ŽBL

Personal information
- Born: September 15, 1990 (age 36) Přerov, Czechoslovakia
- Listed height: 6 ft 1 in (1.85 m)

Pavla Švrdlíková (born September 15, 1990) is a Czech basketball player for BK Handicap Brno and the Czech national team.

She participated at the EuroBasket Women 2017.
