= Zsófia Licskai =

Hungarian basketball player

No. 6 – PEAC-Pécs
- Position: Power forward
- League: NB I/A

Personal information
- Born: October 25, 1993 (age 33) Kapuvár, Hungary
- Listed height: 6 ft 2 in (1.88 m)

Zsófia Licskai (born October 25, 1993) is a Hungarian basketball player for PEAC-Pécs and the Hungarian national team.

She participated at the EuroBasket Women 2017.
