= Maryia Papova =

Belarusian basketball player

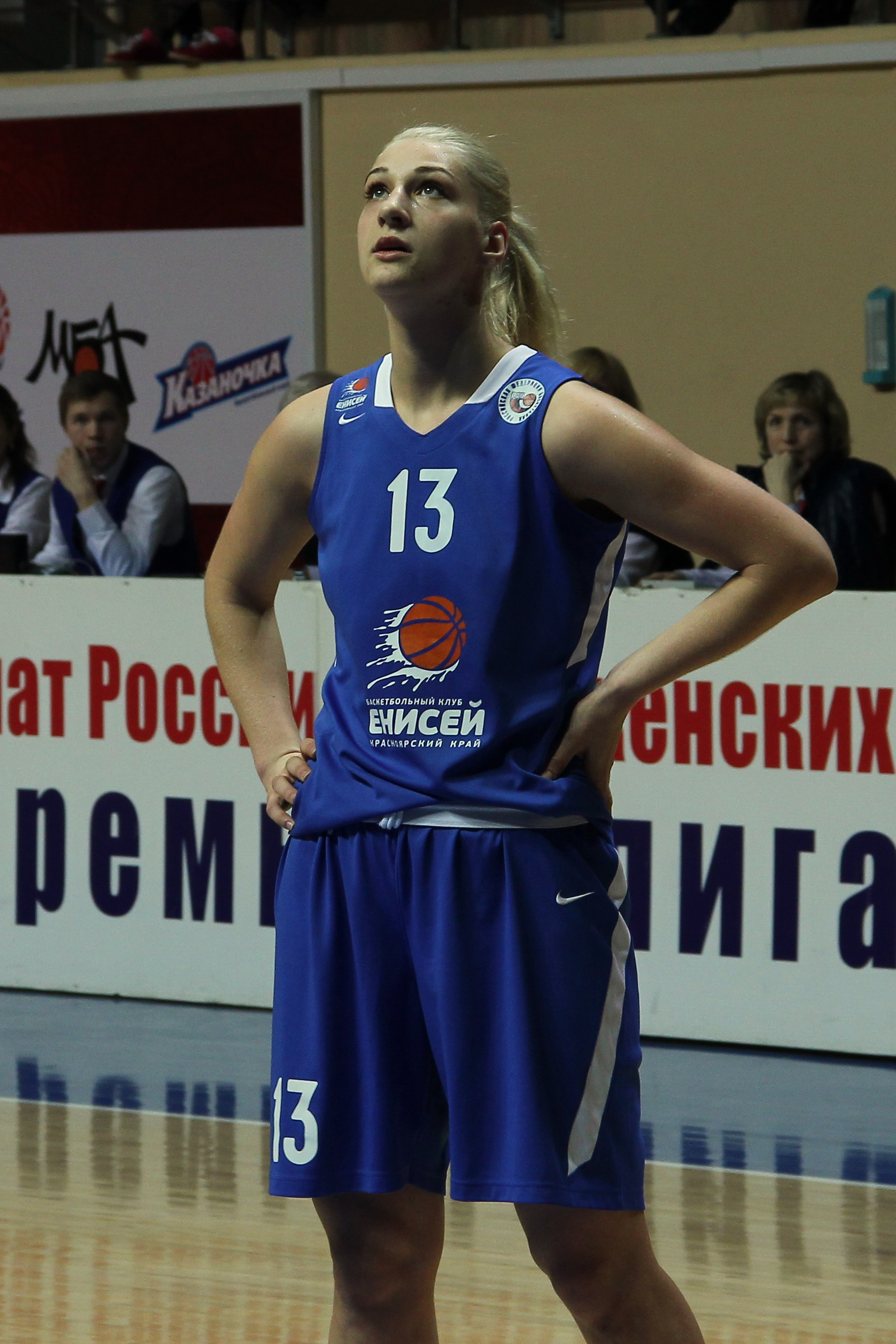

No. 13 – Galatasaray
- Position: Power forward
- League: TKBL

Personal information
- Born: 13 July 1994 (age 32) Babruysk, Belarus
- Listed height: 6 ft 2 in (1.88 m)
- Listed weight: 187 lb (85 kg)

Maryia Papova (born 13 July 1994) is a Belarusian basketball player for Galatasaray and the Belarusian national team, where she participated at the 2014 FIBA World Championship.
