= Olga Maznichenko =

Ukrainian basketball player (born 1991)

No. 10 /24 – Montbrison Féminin
- Position: Power forward
- League: LFB

Personal information
- Born: July 24, 1991 (age 35) Myrhorod, Ukraine
- Listed height: 6 ft 2 in (1.88 m)
Medals
Representing Ukraine
World Cup
Bronze medal – third place	2012 Athens	Mixed 3x3
European Games
Silver medal – second place	2015 Baku	Women's 3x3

Olga Maznichenko (born July 24, 1991) is a Ukrainian basketball player for Montbrison Féminin and the Ukrainian national team.

She participated in the EuroBasket Women 2017.
