= Hhadydia Minte =

French basketball player

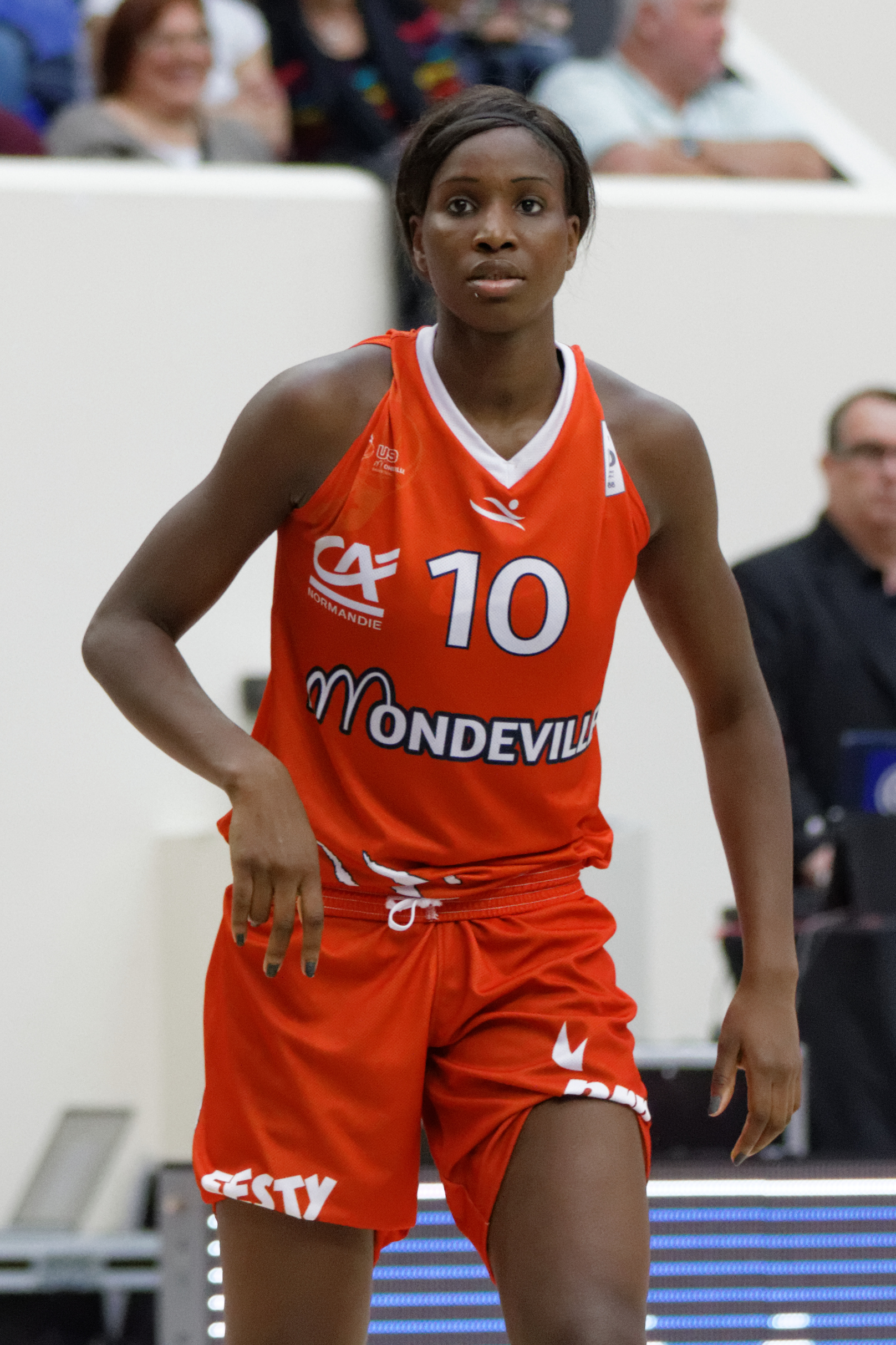
- Minte in 2013

No. 10 – Flammes Carolo basket
- Position: Small forward
- League: LFB

Personal information
- Born: March 16, 1991 (age 35) Paris, France
- Listed height: 6 ft 2 in (1.88 m)

Hhadydia Minte (born March 16, 1991, in Paris) is a French basketball player for Flammes Carolo basket and the French national team. She played for club USO Mondeville Basket of the Ligue Féminine de Basketball the top league of basketball of women in France.

She participated at the EuroBasket Women 2017.
