= PINKK-Pécsi 424 =

- Nickname: Mecsekbasket Kft.
- Leagues: NB I/A
- Founded: 2012
- Arena: Gandhi Sports Hall, Pécs
- Location: Pécs
- Team colors: Black, white and pink
- Championships: 1 (2013–2014)
- Website: http://pinkk.hu

Pécsi Női Kosárlabda Klub Sportegyesület (PINKK Pécsi 424) is a Hungarian women's basketball team, that competes in the top flight of the Hungarian women's basketball leagues. The club is a successor of Bajai NKK (and is officially located in Pécs). The team had to play in Komló between 2012 and 2016, since 2016 they are playing in Pécs.

The club was renamed in 2012 after the cessation of Pécs 2010, the former basketball club in the city.

== Current roster ==
The list of players of PINKK-Pécsi 424 in the 2012/13 season is the following:

PINKK-Pécsi 424 roster
Players
Coaches

| Pos. | No. | Nat. | Name | Ht. | Age |
|---|---|---|---|---|---|
| SF | 6 | (Hungary) | Angerné Kováts, Nóra | 1.80 m (5 ft 11 in) | 37 – 1 June 1988 |
| SF | 7 | (Hungary) | Török, Szilvia | 1.73 m (5 ft 8 in) | 44 – 28 August 1981 |
| SG | 8 | (Hungary) | Iványi, Dalma | 1.75 m (5 ft 9 in) | 49 – 18 March 1976 |
| C | 9 | (Hungary) | Sarok, Nikolett | 1.80 m (5 ft 11 in) | 35 – 17 April 1990 |
| PG | 10 | (Ukraine) | Dorogobuzova, Kateryna | 1.90 m (6 ft 3 in) | 35 – 28 June 1990 |
| PF | 12 | (Hungary) | Ruják, Nóra | 1.74 m (5 ft 9 in) | 35 – 24 March 1990 |
| C | 14 | (Latvia) | Brumermane, Aija | 1.91 m (6 ft 3 in) | 39 – 17 October 1986 |
| SG | 15 | (Hungary) | Laczi, Edit | 1.79 m (5 ft 10 in) | 37 – 17 March 1988 |
| SF | 18 | (Hungary) | Kovács, Krisztina | 1.85 m (6 ft 1 in) | 45 – 8 November 1980 |
| PF | 19 | (Hungary) | Dara, Lilla | 1.84 m (6 ft 0 in) | 31 – 21 August 1994 |
| PG | 21 | (Hungary) | Lengyel, Dalma | 1.72 m (5 ft 8 in) | 37 – 4 July 1988 |
| SG | 22 | (Hungary) | Pénzes, Kinga | 1.75 m (5 ft 9 in) | 42 – 4 March 1983 |
| PF | 24 | (Hungary) | Erős, Fruzsina | 1.73 m (5 ft 8 in) | 30 – 7 June 1995 |

Head coach

- (Spain) Roberto Hernández

Legend

- (C) Team captain
- Injured

- Roster
Updated: 2013-01-05
