= Esra Ural =

Turkish basketball player

Esra Ural Topuz
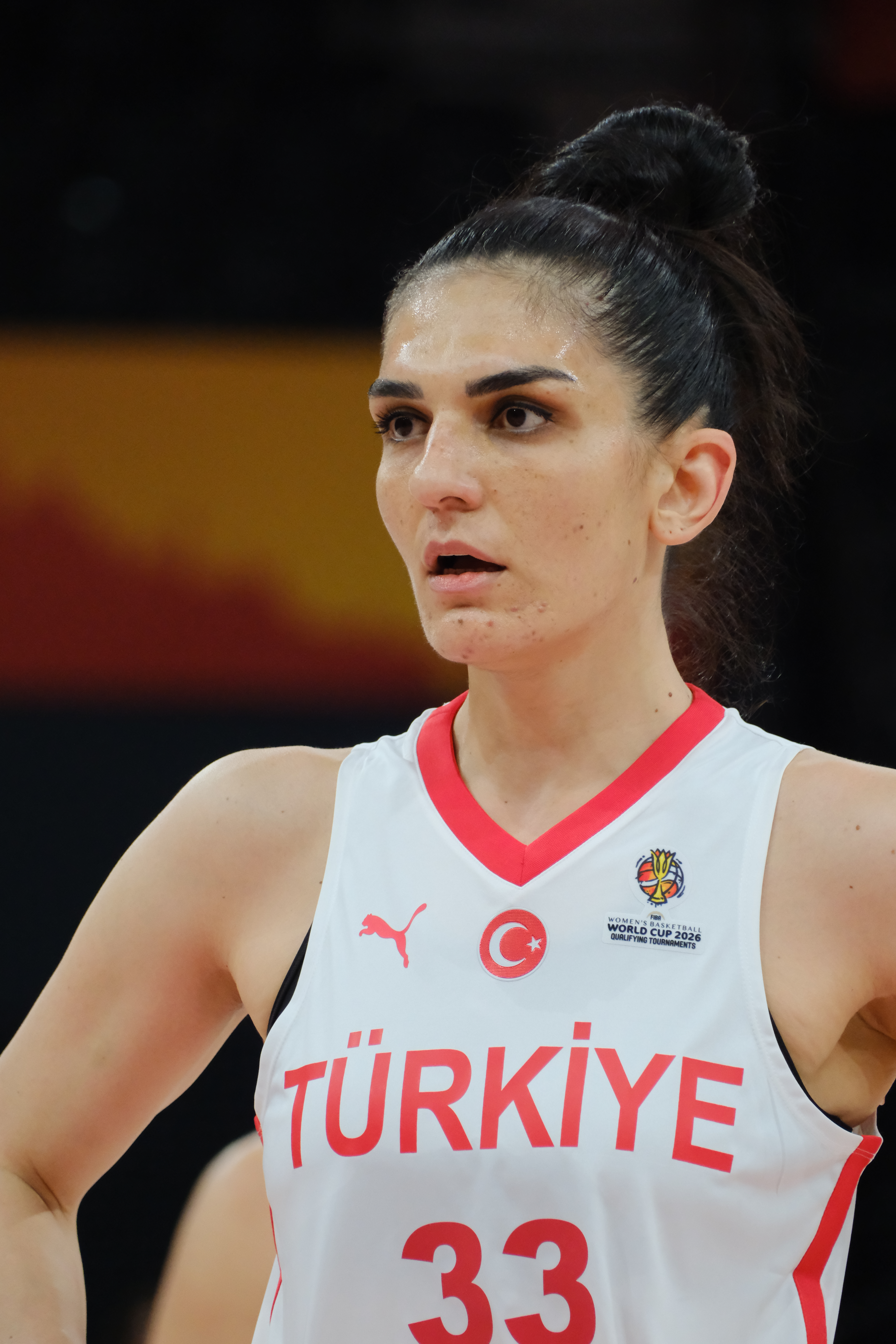

No. 33 – ÇBK Mersin
- Position: Center
- League: Turkish Super League

Personal information
- Born: 18 August 1991 (age 35) Mersin, Turkey
- Listed height: 6 ft 6 in (1.98 m)
- Listed weight: 198 lb (90 kg)

Career information
- Playing career: 2006–present

Career history
- 2006–2007: Mersin Büyükşehir Belediyespor
- 2007–2016: Kayseri Basketbol
- 2011–2012: → Nesibe Aydın
- 2016–2020: Fenerbahçe
- 2020–2021: Kayseri Basketbol
- 2021–2023: Çukurova Basketbol
- 2023–2025: OGM Ormanspor
- 2025–present: ÇBK Mersin

Career highlights
- EuroCup champion (2026)

Esra Ural Topuz (born 18 August 1991) is a Turkish female professional basketball player for ÇBK Mersin. She represented Turkey in the Basketball competition at the 2016 Summer Olympics.

== Honors ==
=== Club ===
- 2x Turkish Super League champion (2018, 2019)
- 2x Turkish Cup champion (2019, 2020)
- Turkish Presidential Cup champion (2019)
