= Zsófia Simon =

Hungarian basketball player

No. 7 – UNI Győr
- Position: Shooting guard
- League: NB I/A

Personal information
- Born: December 17, 1989 (age 36) Budapest, Hungary
- Listed height: 5 ft 11 in (1.80 m)

Zsófia Simon (born December 17, 1989) is a Hungarian basketball player for UNI Győr and the Hungarian national team.

She participated at the EuroBasket Women 2017.
