= Valeria De Pretto =

Italian basketball player (born 1991)

No. 8 – Cestistica Spezzina
- Position: Small forward
- League: LegA

Personal information
- Born: 16 November 1991 (age 34) Schio, Italy
- Listed height: 6 ft 1 in (1.85 m)

Valeria De Pretto (born 16 November 1991) is an Italian basketball player for Cestistica Spezzina and the Italian national team.

She participated at the EuroBasket Women 2017.
