= Angelika Slamová =

Slovak basketball player

No. 23 – Piešťanské Čajky
- Position: Shooting guard
- League: SBE

Personal information
- Born: June 19, 1994 (age 32) Dunajská Streda, Slovakia
- Listed height: 5 ft 7 in (1.70 m)

Angelika Slamová (born June 19, 1994) is a Slovak basketball player for Piešťanské Čajky and the Slovak national team.

She participated at the EuroBasket Women 2017.
