= Olesia Malashenko =

Ukrainian basketball player

No. 13 – NSA Club - Lebanon
- Position: Power forward
- League: TKBL

Personal information
- Born: February 21, 1991 (age 35) Chișinău, Soviet Union
- Listed height: 6 ft 2 in (1.88 m)

Olesia Malashenko (born February 21, 1991) is a Ukrainian basketball player for NSA Club and the Ukrainian national team.

She participated at the EuroBasket Women 2017.
