= Maryia Filonchyk =

Belarusian basketball player

No. 13 – Budućnost Podgorica
- Position: Power forward
- League: First League of Montenegro; Adriatic League

Personal information
- Born: 10 January 1992 (age 33) Babruysk, Belarus
- Listed height: 189 cm (6 ft 2 in)
- Listed weight: 74 kg (163 lb)

Career information
- WNBA draft: 2014: undrafted

Career history
- 2012–2016: Olimpia Grodno
- 2016–2017: Chevakata Vologda
- 2017–present: Budućnost Bemax

Maryia Filonchyk (Belarusian: Марыя Філончык; born 10 January 1992) is a Belarusian basketball player. She represented Belarus in the Basketball competition at the 2016 Summer Olympics
