= Sara Krnjić =

Serbian basketball player (born 1991)

No. 7 – UNIQA Sopron
- Position: Center
- League: NB I/A

Personal information
- Born: 15 July 1991 (age 35) Novi Sad, Yugoslavia
- Listed height: 6 ft 4 in (1.93 m)

Career information
- WNBA draft: 2011: 3rd round, 35th overall pick
- Drafted by: Washington Mystics
- Playing career: 2006–present

Career history
- 2006–2008: Vojvodina
- 2008–2011: MiZo Pécs 2010
- 2011–2017: UNIQA Sopron
- 2017–2018: Atomerőmű KSC Szekszárd
- 2018–2019: UNI Győr
- 2019–2022: Atomerőmű KSC Szekszárd
- Stats at Basketball Reference
Medals
Women's basketball
Representing Serbia
Olympic Games
Bronze medal – third place	2016 Rio de Janeiro	Team
EuroBasket
Gold medal – first place	2015 Budapest
European U18 Championship
Gold medal – first place	2007 Serbia	Team

Sara Krnjić (Serbian Cyrillic: Сара Крњић, born 15 July 1991) is a Serbian professional women's basketball player who plays for UNIQA Euroleasing Sopron of the Hungarian League. Standing at 1.93 m (6 ft 4 in), she plays at the center position. She also represents the Serbia national basketball team.

== International career ==
She represented Serbian national basketball team at the EuroBasket 2015 in Budapest where they won the gold medal, and qualified for the 2016 Olympics, first in the history for the Serbian team.

== See also ==
- List of Serbian WNBA players
