= 2010 FIBA Europe Under-20 Championship for Women =

International basketball competition

2010 FIBA U20 Women's European Championship
9th FIBA Under-20 Women's European Basketball Championship

Tournament details
- Host country: Latvia
- Dates: 15–25 July 2010
- Teams: 16 (from 1 federation)
- Venues: 2 (in 2 host cities)

Final positions
- Champions: Russia (5th title)

Tournament statistics
- MVP: (Russia) Anastasia Logunova
- Top scorer: (Lithuania) Marina Solopova (21.0)
- Top rebounds: (Lithuania) Giedre Paugaite (11.4)
- Top assists: (Ukraine) Alina Iagupova (5.9)
- PPG (Team): Spain (76.0)
- RPG (Team): Spain (47.7)
- APG (Team): Spain (16.3)

Official website
- www.fibaeurope.com

The 2010 FIBA Europe Under-20 Championship for Women was the ninth edition of the FIBA Europe Under-20 Championship for Women. 16 teams featured in the competition, held in Liepāja and Grobiņa, Latvia, from 15 to 25 July 2010. France were the defending champions. Russia won the title against Spain.

== Participating teams ==
- Belarus
- Bulgaria
- France
- Germany
- Italy
- Latvia
- Lithuania
- Netherlands ▲ (Winners, 2009 FIBA Europe Under-20 Championship for Women Division B)
- Poland
- Romania ▲ (Runners-up, 2009 FIBA Europe Under-20 Championship for Women Division B)
- Russia
- Serbia
- Spain
- Sweden
- Turkey
- Ukraine

== Group stages ==
=== Preliminary round ===
In this round, the sixteen teams were allocated in four groups of four teams each. The top three will qualify for the qualifying round. The last team of each group will play for the 13th–16th place in the Classification Games.

Team advances to Qualifying Round
Team will compete in Classification Round

Times given below are in CEST (UTC+2).

==== Group A ====
Team	Pld	W	L	PF	PA	PD	Pts	Tiebreaker
France	3	3	0	236	134	+102	6	
Poland	3	2	1	153	177	−24	5	
Netherlands	3	1	2	172	187	−15	4	
Bulgaria	3	0	3	123	186	−63	3	

July 15
14:00

Report

Bulgaria	51–73	France
Scoring by quarter: 12–24, 17–14, 11–23, 11–12
Pts: Kocheva 11; Rebs: Kocheva 6 Asts: Dilova 4		Pts: Datchy 16; Rebs: Martins, Medenou 6 Asts: Martins, Zouzouo 3

Liepāja Olympic Center, Liepāja
Referees: Sergiy Chebyshev, Nikolaos Somos, Vladyslav Isachenko

July 15
16:15

Report

Netherlands	57–72	Poland
Scoring by quarter: 18–12, 17–25, 8–14, 14–21
Pts: Ten Caat 16; Rebs: van Grinsven, Ligthart 10; Asts: Ten Caat, van Grinsven, van der Hoe, Lammerink 2		Pts: Sosnowska 14; Rebs: Sosnowska, Markiewicz 6 Asts: Tomialowicz 6

Liepāja Olympic Center, Liepāja
Referees: Mauro Pozzana, Jelena Tomic, Evgeny Vetrov

July 16
14:00

Report

Poland	50–40	Bulgaria
Scoring by quarter: 12–12, 11–7, 12–11, 15–10
Pts: Misiuk, Tomialowicz 13; Rebs: Misiuk 11; Asts: Tomialowicz 4		Pts: Zagorova 13; Rebs: Antoniya Zagorova 8 Asts: Kancheva, Dencheva, Videnova, Boycheva 1

Liepāja Olympic Center, Liepāja
Referees: Oskars Lucis, Francisco Araña, Asa Johansson

July 16
16:15

Report

France	83–52	Netherlands
Scoring by quarter: 22–11, 22–11, 17–19, 22–11
Pts: Tchatchouang 18; Rebs: Tchatchouang 5 Asts: Konaté 5		Pts: van Grinsven 9 Rebs: van Grinsven 6 Asts: Klein, van Grinsven, Dekker 2

Liepāja Olympic Center, Liepāja
Referees: Aleksander Gorshkov, Si-Man Leil, Martins Briedis

July 17
13:30

Report

Bulgaria	32–63	Netherlands
Scoring by quarter: 5–23, 9–9, 12–15, 6–16
Pts: Kancheva 7 Rebs: Zagorova, Videnova 6 Asts: Boycheva 2		Pts: Klein 12; Rebs: van den Nieuwendijk 10; Asts: Kuijt, van den Adel 3

Grobiņa Sport Hall, Grobiņa
Referees: Martynas Gudas, Jelena Tomic, Piotr Ivashkov

July 17
15:45

Report

Poland	31–80	France
Scoring by quarter: 9–19, 16–15, 4–22, 2–24
Pts: Misiuk 6 Rebs: Misiuk 13; Asts: Cebulska 3		Pts: Colo 12; Rebs: Tchatchouang 5 Asts: Konaté, Minte 3

Grobiņa Sport Hall, Grobiņa
Referees: Marius Ciulin, Elif Inci, Evgeny Vetrov

==== Group B ====
Team	Pld	W	L	PF	PA	PD	Pts	Tiebreaker
Russia	3	2	1	213	213	0	5	
Latvia	3	2	1	245	175	+70	5	
Ukraine	3	1	2	224	227	−3	4	
Sweden	3	1	2	170	237	−67	4	

July 15
18:30

Report

Ukraine	74–79	Russia
Scoring by quarter: 21–19, 21–17, 18–22, 14–21
Pts: Iagupova 22; Rebs: Malashenko 12; Asts: Iagupova 6		Pts: Shilova 23; Rebs: Dorosheva 8 Asts: Logunova, Shilova, Panevina 4

Liepāja Olympic Center, Liepāja
Referees: Francisco Araña, Martynas Gudas, Maja Vukanovic

July 15
21:10

Report

Latvia	87–41	Sweden
Scoring by quarter: 18–6, 22–5, 25–7, 22–23
Pts: Niedola 29; Rebs: Niedola, Vitola 11; Asts: Klintsone 7		Pts: Gullberg 16; Rebs: Gullberg, Ahlin 3 Asts: Fogdemark, Gültekin 2

Liepāja Olympic Center, Liepāja
Referees: Oliver Krause, Jaroslav Janac, Elif Inci

July 16
18:30

Report

Sweden	58–89	Ukraine
Scoring by quarter: 11–25, 9–21, 17–25, 21–18
Pts: Gültekin 18; Rebs: Hamilton 7 Asts: Gullberg, Stoltz 2		Pts: Iagupova 15; Rebs: Iagupova 8 Asts: Maznichenko, Iagupova 3

Liepāja Olympic Center, Liepāja
Referees: Nikolaos Somos, Piotr Ivashkov, Paulus Van Den Heuvel

July 16
20:45

Report

Russia	73–68 (OT)	Latvia
Scoring by quarter: 22–17, 15–0, 18–23, 4–19, Overtime: 14–9
Pts: Logunova 21; Rebs: Loginova 7 Asts: Zlyvko, Logunova 3		Pts: Klintsone 17; Rebs: Niedola 10; Asts: Klintsone 4

Liepāja Olympic Center, Liepāja
Referees: Marius Ciulin, Mauro Pozzana, Dariusz Lenczowski

July 17
18:00

Report

Sweden	71–61	Russia
Scoring by quarter: 17–9, 14–20, 15–17, 25–15
Pts: Gültekin 24; Rebs: Fogdemark 10; Asts: Gültekin 5		Pts: Shilova 11; Rebs: Shilova 5 Asts: Ostroukhova 3

Grobiņa Sport Hall, Grobiņa
Referees: Oliver Krause, Maja Vukanovic, Miroslav Tomov

July 17
20:15

Report

Ukraine	61–90	Latvia
Scoring by quarter: 12–23, 16–23, 18–26, 15–18
Pts: Malashenko 17; Rebs: Malashenko 9 Asts: Matsko, Iagupova 4		Pts: Krastina, Niedola 15; Rebs: Steinberga 6 Asts: Priede 8

Grobiņa Sport Hall, Grobiņa
Referees: Nicolas Maestre, Nikolaos Somos, Haris Bijedi

==== Group C ====
Team	Pld	W	L	PF	PA	PD	Pts	Tiebreaker
Spain	3	3	0	228	160	+68	6	
Serbia	3	2	1	227	198	+37	5	
Italy	3	1	2	159	189	−30	4	
Germany	3	0	3	141	208	−67	3	

July 15
14:15

Report

Germany	63–80	Serbia
Scoring by quarter: 15–27, 15–15, 16–24, 17–14
Pts: Rexroth 14; Rebs: Greunke 7 Asts: Wagner 3		Pts: Sara Krnjić 20; Rebs: Ajduković, Krnjic 10; Asts: Popović 10

Grobiņa Sport Hall, Grobiņa
Referees: Nicolas Maestre, Marius Ciulin, Si-Man Le

July 15
18:00

Report

Italy	50–74	Spain
Scoring by quarter: 14–15, 4–21, 20–16, 12–22
Pts: M. Bestagno 13; Rebs: M. Bestagno, Tognalini 4 Asts: E. Bestagno 5		Pts: Gimeno 17; Rebs: Ouviña, Gil 8 Asts: Rodríguez, Gimeno, Gil 4

Grobiņa Sport Hall, Grobiņa
Referees: Oskars Lucis, Haris Bijedic, Piotr Ivashkov

July 16
13:30

Report

Serbia	80–60	Italy
Scoring by quarter: 15–24, 20–16, 20–7, 25–13
Pts: Orozović 21; Rebs: Krnjić 10; Asts: Popović 5		Pts: Bestagno 22; Rebs: Bestagno 6 Asts: Bestagno, Milazzo 4

Grobiņa Sport Hall, Grobiņa
Referees: Sergiy Chebyshev, Miroslav Tomov, Elif Inci

July 16
15:45

Report

Spain	79–43	Germany
Scoring by quarter: 19–8, 29–13, 19–6, 12–16
Pts: Rodríguez 19; Rebs: Xargay 11; Asts: Ouviña, Espiau, Xargay, Vila 3		Pts: Brunckhorst 11; Rebs: Greunke 5 Asts: Rexroth 3

Grobiņa Sport Hall, Grobiņa
Referees: Jaroslav Janac, Jelena Tomic, Martynas Gudas

July 17
14:00

Report

Italy	49–35	Germany
Scoring by quarter: 8–7, 12–12, 12–11, 17–5
Pts: Spreafico 19; Rebs: Tognalini, Spreafico 10; Asts: Bestagno, Milazzo 3		Pts: Wagner 10; Rebs: Mankertz, Frankenberger 6 Asts: Brunckhorst 2

Liepāja Olympic Center, Liepāja
Referees: Aleksander Gorshkov, Vladyslav Isachenko, Asa Johansson

July 17
16:15

Report

Serbia	67–75	Spain
Scoring by quarter: 22–21, 14–19, 17–14, 14–21
Pts: Jovanović 15; Rebs: Jovanović 7 Asts: Popović 3		Pts: Ouviña 19; Rebs: Gil 7 Asts: Ouviña 3

Liepāja Olympic Center, Liepāja
Referees: Jaroslav Janac, Oskars Lucis, Dariusz Lenczowsk

==== Group D ====
Team	Pld	W	L	PF	PA	PD	Pts	Tiebreaker
Turkey	3	3	0	208	176	+32	6	
Lithuania	3	2	1	213	156	+57	5	
Belarus	3	1	2	206	212	−6	4	
Romania	3	0	3	152	235	−57	3	

July 15
13:30

Report

Belarus	56–74	Lithuania
Scoring by quarter: 10–21, 17–12, 15–22, 14–19
Pts: Filonchyk 17; Rebs: Ivashchanka 9 Asts: Zubrytskaya 3		Pts: Solopova 29; Rebs: Siksniute 16; Asts: Solopova 6

Grobiņa Sport Hall, Grobiņa
Referees: Aleksander Gorshkov, Dariusz Lenczowski, Asa Johansson

July 15
21:30

Report

Romania	53–69	Turkey
Scoring by quarter: 12–23, 18–10, 9–17, 14–19
Pts: Manta 13; Rebs: Pavel, Manta 10; Asts: Ionescu 4		Pts: Yavas, Karatas 12; Rebs: Canitez 16; Asts: Cigil, Canitez, Saylar, Gezgin 2

Grobiņa Sport Hall, Grobiņa
Referees: Miroslav Tomov, Martins Briedis, Paulus Van Den Heuvel

July 16
18:00

Report

Turkey	75–61	Belarus
Scoring by quarter: 23–8, 17–20, 20–14, 15–19
Pts: Canitez 16; Rebs: Canitez 16; Asts: Yavas 6		Pts: Filonchyk 17; Rebs: Ivashchanka 8 Asts: Zubrytskaya 6

Grobiņa Sport Hall, Grobiņa
Referees: Oliver Krause, Haris Bijedic, Evgeny Vetrov

July 16
20:15

Report

Lithuania	77–36	Romania
Scoring by quarter: 22–10, 18–6, 17–9, 20–11
Pts: Solopova 22; Rebs: Paugaite, Siksniute 9 Asts: Solopova 6		Pts: Munteanu 10; Rebs: Manta 9 Asts: Chivu, Alecu, Manta, Ferenczi, Teodorescu, Craciun 1

Grobiņa Sport Hall, Grobiņa
Referees: Nicolas Maestre, Vladyslav Isachenko, Maja Vukanovic

July 17
18:30

Report

Belarus	89–63	Romania
Scoring by quarter: 23–20, 27–19, 18–12, 21–12
Pts: Musatava 20; Rebs: Papova 6 Asts: Kashlei 6		Pts: Pavel 22; Rebs: Pavel 10; Asts: Pavel 2

Liepāja Olympic Center, Liepāja
Referees: Mauro Pozzana, Paulus Van Den Heuvel, Si-Man Lei

July 17
20:45

Report

Turkey	64–62	Lithuania
Scoring by quarter: 14–8, 11–25, 16–15, 23–14
Pts: Canitez 20; Rebs: Canitez 10; Asts: Saylar 3		Pts: Solopova 31; Rebs: Paugaite 23; Asts: Visgaudaite 6

Liepāja Olympic Center, Liepāja
Referees: Francisco Araña, Sergiy Chebyshev, Martins Briedis

=== Qualifying round ===
The twelve teams remaining will be allocated in two groups of six teams each. The four top teams will advance to the quarterfinals. The last two teams of each group will play for the 9th–12th place.

Team advances to Quarterfinals
Team will compete in 9th–12th playoffs

==== Group E ====
Team	Pld	W	L	PF	PA	PD	Pts	Tiebreaker
Russia	5	4	1	356	337	+19	9	
Latvia	5	4	1	362	310	+52	9	
France	5	3	2	369	295	+74	8	
Ukraine	5	2	3	354	372	−18	7	
Poland	5	1	4	264	342	−78	6	
Netherlands	5	1	4	316	365	−49	6	

July 19
16:15

Report

Netherlands	74–53	Russia
Scoring by quarter: 17–14, 16–9, 18–19, 23–11
Pts: Klein 25; Rebs: van Grinsven 11; Asts: Klein 3		Pts: Petrushina 12; Rebs: Loginova 6 Asts: Shilova, Panevina 2

Liepāja Olympic Center, Liepāja
Referees: Haris Bijedic, Miroslav Tomov, Si-Man Lei

July 19
18:30

Report

Ukraine	66–80	France
Scoring by quarter: 12–21, 20–19, 17–20, 17–20
Pts: Malashenko 22; Rebs: Malashenko, Iagupova 9 Asts: Polyanychka, Maznichenko 3		Pts: Tchatchouang 16; Rebs: Minte 9 Asts: Tchatchouang, Plagnard, Minte 2

Liepāja Olympic Center, Liepāja
Referees: Mauro Pozzana, Elif Inci, Piotr Ivashkov

July 19
20:45

Report

Latvia	63–49	Poland
Scoring by quarter: 19–9, 16–11, 13–10, 15–19
Pts: Niedola 26; Rebs: Niedola 11; Asts: Purina 7		Pts: Tomialowicz 14; Rebs: Misiuk 9 Asts: Cebulska 2

Liepāja Olympic Center, Liepāja
Referees: Francisco Araña, Nikolaos Somos, Martynas Gudas

July 20
18:00

Report

Ukraine	86–73	Netherlands
Scoring by quarter: 31–20, 11–25, 20–14, 24–13
Pts: Malashenko 24; Rebs: Malashenko 11; Asts: Iagupova 8		Pts: van den Adel 24; Rebs: van den Adel 8 Asts: Kuijt, van den Adel 4

Grobiņa Sport Hall, Grobiņa
Referees: Martynas Gudas, Jaroslav Janac, Miroslav Tomov

July 20
20:15

Report

France	67–70	Latvia
Scoring by quarter: 17–17, 13–15, 18–14, 19–24
Pts: Thizy 16; Rebs: Medenou 7 Asts: Plagnard 4		Pts: Klintsone 19; Rebs: Vitola 11; Asts: Krastina 6

Grobiņa Sport Hall, Grobiņa
Referees: Mauro Pozzana, Piotr Ivashkov, Oliver Krause

July 20
20:45

Report

Poland	62–75	Russia
Scoring by quarter: 18–21, 16–17, 17–15, 11–22
Pts: Tomialowicz 17; Rebs: Sosnowska 5 Asts: Tomialowicz 3		Pts: Ostroukhova 15; Rebs: Loginova 10; Asts: Logunova 4

Liepāja Olympic Center, Liepāja
Referees: Asa Johansson, Nikolaos Somos, Marius Ciulin

July 21
16:15

Report

Russia	76–59	France
Scoring by quarter: 16–20, 16–2, 22–18, 22–19
Pts: Petrushina 18; Rebs: Logunova 8 Asts: Logunova 6		Pts: Plagnard 16; Rebs: Zouzouo 10; Asts: Konaté 3

Liepāja Olympic Center, Liepāja
Referees: Asa Johansson, Nikolaos Somos, Marius Ciulin

July 21
20:15

Report

Ukraine	67–50	Poland
Scoring by quarter: 12–7, 23–15, 17–20, 15–8
Pts: Iagupova 21; Rebs: Malashenko 14; Asts: Iagupova 6		Pts: Kaczmarska, Markiewicz 10; Rebs: Misiuk 13; Asts: Cebulska 3

Grobiņa Sport Hall, Grobiņa
Referees: Mauro Pozzana, Oliver Krause, Piotr Ivashkov

July 21
20:45

Report

Netherlands	60–71	Latvia
Scoring by quarter: 12–28, 8–11, 15–15, 25–17
Pts: van Grinsven 16; Rebs: van den Nieuwendijk 10; Asts: Kuijt 5		Pts: Niedola 21; Rebs: Niedola 14; Asts: Klintsone 7

Grobiņa Sport Hall, Grobiņa
Referees: Marius Ciulin, Nikolaos Somos, Maja Vukanovic

==== Group F ====
Team	Pld	W	L	PF	PA	PD	Pts	Tiebreaker
Spain	5	5	0	400	311	+89	10	
Lithuania	5	3	2	339	311	+28	8	
Turkey	5	3	2	334	336	−2	8	
Serbia	5	3	2	368	341	+27	8	
Belarus	5	1	4	319	389	−70	6	
Italy	5	0	5	282	354	−72	5	

July 19
14:00

Report

Lithuania	63–57	Serbia
Scoring by quarter: 16–13, 17–22, 21–10, 9–12
Pts: Siksniute 18; Rebs: Paugaite 17; Asts: Gutkauskaite 4		Pts: Jovanović 15; Rebs: Ajduković, Krnjic, Radovic 5 Asts: Popović 4

Liepāja Olympic Center, Liepāja
Referees: Oliver Krause, Aleksander Gorshkov, Martins Briedis

July 19
18:00

Report

Belarus	69–91	Spain
Scoring by quarter: 17–24, 15–22, 14–24, 23–21
Pts: Kashlei 18; Rebs: Filonchyk 11; Asts: Padshyvalava 4		Pts: Xargay 18; Rebs: Xargay 14; Asts: Cristina Ouviña 8

Grobiņa Sport Hall, Grobiņa
Referees: Nicolas Maestre, Vladyslav Isachenko, Asa Johansson

July 19
20:15

Report

Italy	58–67	Turkey
Scoring by quarter: 17–18, 20–19, 13–15, 8–15
Pts: Tognalini 13; Rebs: Tognalini 9 Asts: Milazzo 2		Pts: Saylar 21; Rebs: Canitez 11; Asts: Saylar 5

Grobiņa Sport Hall, Grobiņa
Referees: Marius Ciulin, Oskars Lucis, Sergiy Chebyshev

July 20
14:00

Report

Spain	80–68	Lithuania
Scoring by quarter: 17–25, 16–12, 22–10, 25–17
Pts: Xargay 22; Rebs: Rodríguez, Gil, Blé 6 Asts: Xargay 5		Pts: Paugaite, Solopova 19; Rebs: Paugaite 15; Asts: Paugaite 4

Liepāja Olympic Center, Liepāja
Referees: Sergiy Chebyshev, Haris Bijedic, Vladyslav Isachenko

July 20
16:15

Report

Belarus	61–60	Italy
Scoring by quarter: 11–9, 14–17, 19–13, 17–21
Pts: Kashlei 15; Rebs: Papova 13; Asts: Filonchyk, Padshyvalava 3		Pts: Cerri 14; Rebs: Cerri 12; Asts: Bestagno 4

Liepāja Olympic Center, Liepāja
Referees: Paulus Van Den Heuvel, Nicolas Maestre, Jelena Tomic

July 20
18:30

Report

Serbia	75–71	Turkey
Scoring by quarter: 16–21, 19–24, 24–14, 16–12
Pts: Krnjić 22; Rebs: Baltić 9 Asts: Popović 4		Pts: Saylar 15; Rebs: Canitez 13; Asts: Cigil 4

Liepāja Olympic Center, Liepāja
Referees: Oskars Lucis, Aleksander Gorshkov, Evgeny Vetrov

July 21
14:00

Report

Serbia	89–72	Belarus
Scoring by quarter: 28–25, 27–10, 12–17, 22–20
Pts: Krnjić 21; Rebs: Krnjić 15; Asts: Popović 6		Pts: Filonchyk, Kashlei 12; Rebs: Filonchyk 9 Asts: Kashlei 4

Liepāja Olympic Center, Liepāja
Referees: Sergiy Chebyshev, Haris Bijedic, Miroslav Tomov

July 21
18:30

Report

Lithuania	72–54	Italy
Scoring by quarter: 12–28, 17–6, 22–7, 21–13
Pts: Solopova, Siksniute 15; Rebs: Pikciute 10; Asts: Gutkauskaite 5		Pts: Tognalini 15; Rebs: Tognalini 7 Asts: Milazzo 4

Liepāja Olympic Center, Liepāja
Referees: Aleksander Gorshkov, Asa Johansson, Oskars Lucis

July 21
20:45

Report

Turkey	57–80	Spain
Scoring by quarter: 12–20, 16–21, 14–17, 15–22
Pts: Gezgin 19; Rebs: Karatas 8 Asts: Saylar 4		Pts: Xargay, Gimeno 13; Rebs: Blé 10; Asts: Xargay 8

Liepāja Olympic Center, Liepāja
Referees: Oskars Lucis, Martins Briedis, Vladyslav Isachenko

=== Classification round ===
The last team of each group in the preliminary round will compete in this Classification Round. The four teams will play in one group. The last two teams will be relegated to Division B for the next championship.

Team will be relegated to 2011 FIBA Europe Under-20 Championship for Women Division B

==== Group G ====
Team	Pld	W	L	PF	PA	PD	Pts	Tiebreaker
Romania	6	5	1	427	320	+107	11	
Germany	6	4	2	428	373	+55	10	
Sweden	6	3	3	379	398	−19	9	
Bulgaria	6	0	6	306	449	−143	6	

July 19
13:30

Report

Bulgaria	51–80	Romania
Scoring by quarter: 12–25, 12–14, 13–10, 14–31
Pts: Kancheva 13; Rebs: Dzhikova 6 Asts: Dilova 2		Pts: Gabriela Munteanu 24; Rebs: Manta 11; Asts: Ferenczi 5

Grobiņa Sport Hall, Grobiņa
Referees: Jaroslav Janac, Dariusz Lenczowski, Jelena Tomic

July 19
15:45

Report

Sweden	57–84	Germany
Scoring by quarter: 18–24, 16–21, 10–18, 13–21
Pts: Hamilton 18; Rebs: Fogdemark 11; Asts: Gültekin, Stoltz 3		Pts: Rexroth 23; Rebs: Bruns, Wagner 6 Asts: Rexroth, Brunckhorst, Bruns 4

Grobiņa Sport Hall, Grobiņa
Referees: Paulus Van Den Heuvel, Evgeny Vetrov, Maja Vukanovic

July 20
13:30

Report

Romania	67–50	Sweden
Scoring by quarter: 21–12, 16–13, 10–8, 20–17
Pts: Pavel, Munteanu 17; Rebs: Pavel 10; Asts: Ferenczi 4		Pts: Hamilton 18; Rebs: Hamilton 8 Asts: Fogdemark, Yderström 3

Grobiņa Sport Hall, Grobiņa
Referees: Francisco Araña, Dariusz Lenczowski, Martins Briedis

July 20
15:45

Report

Germany	70–58	Bulgaria
Scoring by quarter: 8–19, 30–9, 17–14, 15–18
Pts: Wagner 18; Rebs: Wagner 5 Asts: Frankenberger 4		Pts: Zagorova 18; Rebs: Zagorova 8 Asts: Dencheva 4

Grobiņa Sport Hall, Grobiņa
Referees: Maja Vukanovic, Elif Inci, Si-Man Lei

July 21
13:30

Report

Bulgaria	52–72	Sweden
Scoring by quarter: 15–21, 10–13, 13–16, 14–22
Pts: Kocheva 13; Rebs: Dzhikova 7 Asts: Dzhikova, Decheva, Sharenkapova, Kocheva 2		Pts: Hamilton, Ahlin 14; Rebs: Ahlin 8 Asts: Yderström 4

Grobiņa Sport Hall, Grobiņa
Referees: Elif Inci, Si-Man Lei, Jelena Tomic

July 21
15:45

Report

Germany	50–70	Romania
Scoring by quarter: 19–18, 3–19, 11–20, 17–13
Pts: Greunke 12; Rebs: Frankenberger 8 Asts: Mankertz 3		Pts: Pavel 23; Rebs: Manta 14; Asts: Bigica 4

Grobiņa Sport Hall, Grobiņa
Referees: Nicolas Maestre, Paulus Van Den Heuvel, Evgeny Vetrov

July 23
13:30

Report

Germany	64–67	Sweden
Scoring by quarter: 10–15, 13–9, 16–16, 25–27
Pts: Mankertz 19; Rebs: Frankenberger 11; Asts: Brunckhorst 4		Pts: Hamilton 19; Rebs: Fogdemark 12; Asts: Itze 4

Grobiņa Sport Hall, Grobiņa
Referees: Sergiy Chebyshev, Vladyslav Isachenko, Paulus Van Den Heuvel

July 23
15:45

Report

Romania	62–41	Bulgaria
Scoring by quarter: 12–13, 21–10, 20–7, 9–11
Pts: Bigica 23; Rebs: Pop, Manta 9 Asts: Pavel 4		Pts: Sharenkapova 8 Rebs: Kancheva 7 Asts: Zagorova 3

Grobiņa Sport Hall, Grobiņa
Referees: Piotr Ivashkov, Dariusz Lenczowski, Evgeny Vetrov

July 24
13:30

Report

Bulgaria	53–85	Germany
Scoring by quarter: 7–21, 14–14, 16–26, 16–24
Pts: Kancheva 11; Rebs: Kancheva, Dilova 4 Asts: Boycheva 3		Pts: Rexroth 16; Rebs: Bruns 5 Asts: Brunckhorst 5

Grobiņa Sport Hall, Grobiņa
Referees: Nikolaos Somos, Jelena Tomic, Si-Man Lei

July 24
15:45

Report

Sweden	53–80	Romania
Scoring by quarter: 12–17, 12–23, 16–20, 13–20
Pts: Yderström 17; Rebs: Hamilton, Massamba 5 Asts: Gullberg, Yderström 5		Pts: Bigica 23; Rebs: Ferenczi 9 Asts: four players 2

Grobiņa Sport Hall, Grobiņa
Referees: Aleksander Gorshkov, Maja Vukanovic, Elif Inci

July 25
13:30

Report

Sweden	80–51	Bulgaria
Scoring by quarter: 21–17, 31–17, 9–14, 19–3
Pts: Hamilton 20; Rebs: Hamilton 9 Asts: Fogdemark 5		Pts: Kancheva 11; Rebs: Videnova 5 Asts: Videnova 3

Grobiņa Sport Hall, Grobiņa
Referees: Aleksander Gorshkov, Evgeny Vetrov, Dariusz Lenczowski

July 25
15:45

Report

Romania	68–75	Germany
Scoring by quarter: 9–20, 16–22, 16–13, 27–20
Pts: Munteanu 14; Rebs: Chivu 5 Asts: Chivu, Barbu 3		Pts: Mankertz 13; Rebs: Brunckhorst 10; Asts: Rexroth 5

Grobiņa Sport Hall, Grobiņa

== Knockout round ==
=== Championship ===
Quarter-finals
July 23 – Liepāja
Russia	92
Serbia	72
July 23 – Liepāja
Lithuania	61
France	69
July 23 – Liepāja
Latvia	64
Turkey	57
July 23 – Liepāja
Spain	75
Ukraine	74

Semi-finals
July 24 – Liepāja
Russia	81
France	65
July 24 – Liepāja
Latvia	52
Spain	56

Final
July 25 – Liepāja
Russia	75
Spain	74
Third place
July 25 – Liepāja
France	49
Latvia	53

==== Quarterfinals ====
July 23
14:00

Report

Russia	92–72	Serbia
Scoring by quarter: 19–20, 34–16, 21–15, 18–21
Pts: Shilova 21; Rebs: Logunova, Petrushina, Shilova 6 Asts: Logunova 5		Pts: Krnjić 15; Rebs: Krnjić 6 Asts: Baltić 4

Liepāja Olympic Center, Liepāja
Attendance: 100
Referees: Oskars Lucis, Marius Ciulin, Elif Inci

July 23
16:15

Report

Lithuania	61–69	France
Scoring by quarter: 21–15, 15–15, 12–16, 13–23
Pts: Solopova 17; Rebs: Paugaite 13; Asts: Solopova 5		Pts: Datchy 22; Rebs: Minte 11; Asts: Plagnard 5

Liepāja Olympic Center, Liepāja
Attendance: 150
Referees: Francisco Araña, Oliver Krause, Miroslav Tomov

July 23
18:30

Report

Spain	75–74	Ukraine
Scoring by quarter: 19–27, 20–16, 18–18, 18–13
Pts: Rodríguez 20; Rebs: Gimeno, Gil, Blé 7 Asts: Xargay 4		Pts: Maznichenko 24; Rebs: Iagupova 15; Asts: Iagupova 7

Liepāja Olympic Center, Liepāja
Attendance: 300
Referees: Aleksander Gorshkov, Nikolaos Somos, Martynas Gudas

July 23
20:45

Report

Latvia	64–57	Turkey
Scoring by quarter: 12–15, 21–10, 9–15, 22–17
Pts: Klintsone 17; Rebs: Steinberga, Niedola 9 Asts: Klintsone, Priede 4		Pts: Yavas 13; Rebs: Canitez 8 Asts: five players 2

Liepāja Olympic Center, Liepāja
Attendance: 2 400
Referees: Mauro Pozzana, Haris Bijedic, Nicolas Maestre

==== Semifinals ====
July 24
18:30

Report

Russia	81–65	France
Scoring by quarter: 21–13, 18–12, 26–20, 16–20
Pts: Ostroukhova 22; Rebs: Logunova 9 Asts: Logunova 5		Pts: Zouzouo 18; Rebs: Medenou, Zouzouo 5 Asts: three players 3

Liepāja Olympic Center, Liepāja
Attendance: 300
Referees: Mauro Pozzana, Martynas Gudas, Haris Bijedic

July 24
20:45

Report

Latvia	52–56	Spain
Scoring by quarter: 17–8, 7–15, 17–9, 11–24
Pts: Steinberga 16; Rebs: Niedola 11; Asts: four players 2		Pts: Xargay, Gastaminza 13; Rebs: Gastaminzao 11; Asts: Ouviña 6

Liepāja Olympic Center, Liepāja
Attendance: 3 000
Referees: Marius Ciulin, Sergiy Chebyshev, Miroslav Tomov

==== Bronze medal game ====
July 25
18:30

Report

France	49–53	Latvia
Scoring by quarter: 21–8, 10–11, 6–14, 12–20
Pts: Minte 11; Rebs: Minte 13; Asts: Plagnard 5		Pts: Steinberga 14; Rebs: Niedola, Vitola 9 Asts: Priede 3

Liepāja Olympic Center, Liepāja
Attendance: 3 000
Referees: Francisco Araña, Jaroslav Janac, Asa Johansson

==== Final ====
July 25
20:45

Report

Russia	75–74	Spain
Scoring by quarter: 18–14, 20–18, 21–24, 16–18
Pts: Shilova 21; Rebs: Shilova, Paskalenko 7 Asts: Ostroukhova, Panevina 4		Pts: Ouviña 24; Rebs: Gastaminza 10; Asts: Xargay 5

Liepāja Olympic Center, Liepāja
Attendance: 2 500
Referees: Oskars Lucis, Nikolaos Somos, Maja Vukanovic

=== 5th–8th playoffs ===
Semi-finals
July 24 – Liepāja
Serbia	59
Lithuania	63
July 24 – Liepāja
Turkey	55
Ukraine	74

Fifth place
July 25 – Liepāja
Lithuania	64
Ukraine	82
Seventh place
July 25 – Liepāja
Serbia	46
Turkey	68

==== 5th–8th semifinals ====
July 24
14:00

Report

Serbia	59–63	Lithuania
Scoring by quarter: 15–13, 14–19, 16–14, 14–17
Pts: Orozović 17; Rebs: Krnjić 7 Asts: Krnjić 2		Pts: Paugaite 19; Rebs: Paugaite 12; Asts: Solopova 3

Liepāja Olympic Center, Liepāja
Referees: Francisco Araña, Martins Briedis, Evgeny Vetrov

July 24
16:15

Report

Turkey	55–74	Ukraine
Scoring by quarter: 16–13, 18–16, 19–23, 2–22
Pts: Gezgin 11; Rebs: Canitez 6 Asts: Yavas, Gezgin 3		Pts: Iagupova 26; Rebs: Malashenko 8 Asts: Iagupova 11

Liepāja Olympic Center, Liepāja
Referees: Oskars Lucis, Paulus Van Den Heuvel, Jaroslav Janac

==== 7th place playoff ====
July 25
14:00

Report

Serbia	46–68	Turkey
Scoring by quarter: 16–13, 18–16, 19–23, 2–22
Pts: Bošković 8 Rebs: Radović 12; Asts: Radović 3		Pts: Cigil, Karaman 13; Rebs: Ural 13; Asts: Yavas 5

Liepāja Olympic Center, Liepāja
Referees: Sergiy Chebyshev, Oliver Krause, Martynas Gudas

==== 5th place playoff ====
July 25
16:15

Report

Lithuania	64–82	Ukraine
Scoring by quarter: 18–12, 20–25, 12–26, 14–19
Pts: Mazionyte, Pikciute 14; Rebs: Paugaite 7 Asts: three players 2		Pts: Iagupova 24; Rebs: three players 8 Asts: Iagupova 8

Liepāja Olympic Center, Liepāja
Referees: Nicolas Maestre, Mauro Pozzana, Martins Briedis

=== 9th–12th playoffs ===
Semi-finals
July 23 – Grobiņa
Poland	66
Italy	53
July 23 – Grobiņa
Belarus	78
Netherlands	88

Ninth place
July 24 – Grobiņa
Poland	61
Netherlands	50
Eleventh place
July 24 – Grobiņa
Italy	72
Belarus	91

==== 9th–12th semifinals ====
July 23
18:00

Report

Poland	66–53	Italy
Scoring by quarter: 22–12, 18–10, 16–14, 10–17
Pts: Tomialowicz 15; Rebs: Sosnowska 14; Asts: Kaczmarska 5		Pts: Spreafico 19; Rebs: Rulli 5 Asts: Milazzo, Quarta 2

Grobiņa Sport Hall, Grobiņa
Referees: Jaroslav Janac, Martins Briedis, Maja Vukanovic

July 23
20:15

Report

Belarus	78–88	Netherlands
Scoring by quarter: 15–19, 17–17, 17–29, 29–23
Pts: Filonchyk 21; Rebs: Filonchyk 8 Asts: Filonchyk 4		Pts: van Grinsven 19; Rebs: van Grinsven 13; Asts: Ten Caat, van den Adel 5

Grobiņa Sport Hall, Grobiņa
Referees: Asa Johansson, Jelena Tomic, Si-Man Lei

==== 11th place playoff ====
July 24
18:00

Report

Italy	72–91	Belarus
Scoring by quarter: 19–16, 19–23, 12–28, 22–24
Pts: Bestagno 17; Rebs: Cerri 7 Asts: Spreafico 5		Pts: Kashlei 24; Rebs: Filonchyk 11; Asts: Kashlei, Musatava 5

Grobiņa Sport Hall, Grobiņa
Referees: Nicolas Maestre, Dariusz Lenczowski, Asa Johansson

==== 9th place playoff ====
July 24
20:15

Report

Poland	61–50	Netherlands
Scoring by quarter: 17–14, 22–12, 13–6, 9–18
Pts: Kaczmarska, Cebulska 15; Rebs: Misiuk, Cebulska 10; Asts: Kaczmarska, Krzyzaniak 3		Pts: Klein 17; Rebs: van den Nieuwendijk 10; Asts: van Grinsven 2

Grobiņa Sport Hall, Grobiņa
Referees: Oliver Krause, Vladyslav Isachenko, Piotr Ivashkov

== Final standings ==
Rank	Team	Record
Gold medal	Russia	7–2
Silver medal	Spain	8–1
Bronze medal	Latvia	7–2
4th	France	5–4
5th	Ukraine	5–4
6th	Lithuania	5–4
7th	Turkey	6–3
8th	Serbia	4–5
9th	Poland	4–4
10th	Netherlands	3–5
11th	Belarus	3–5
12th	Italy	1–7
13th	Romania	5–4
14th	Germany	4–5
15th	Sweden	4–5
16th	Bulgaria	0–9

2010 FIBA Europe Under-20 Championship for Women winner

Russia
Fifth title

Most Valuable Player
(Russia) Anastasia Logunova

Fair-play award
France

Team relegated to 2011 FIBA Europe Under-20 Championship for Women Division B

== Statistical leaders ==
Points

Name	PPG
(Lithuania) Marina Solopova	21.0
(Ukraine) Olesia Malashenko	17.8
(Ukraine) Alina Iagupova	17.6
(Latvia) Sabine Niedola	16.9
(Romania) Cristina Bigica	15.6

Rebounds

Name	RPG
(Lithuania) Giedre Paugaite	11.4
(Turkey) Tugce Canitez	9.9
(Ukraine) Olesia Malashenko	9.6
(Latvia) Sabine Niedola	9.4
(Ukraine) Alina Iagupova	8.7

Assists

Name	APG
(Ukraine) Alina Iagupova	5.9
(Serbia) Popović	4.0
(Spain) Cristina Ouviña	3.8
(Spain) Marta Xargay	3.7
(Lithuania) Marina Solopova	3.6

Blocks

Name	BPG
(Lithuania) Giedre Paugaité	2.3
(Ukraine) Olesia Malashenko	1.6
(Spain) Amaya Gastaminza	1.4
(Romania) Maria Manta	1.4
(Belarus) Maryia Filonchyk	1.4

Steals

Name	SPG
(Ukraine) Alina Iagupova	3.1
(Lithuania) Marina Solopova	2.5
(Spain) Cristina Ouviña	2.4
(France) Diandra Tchatchouang	2.2
(Germany) Wiebke Bruns	2.1
