= 2007 FIBA Under-19 World Championship for Women =

Tournament details
- Host country: Slovakia
- City: Bratislava
- Dates: 26 July – 5 August
- Teams: 16 (from 5 confederations)
- Venues: 2 (in 1 host city)

Final positions
- Champions: United States (3rd title)

Tournament statistics
- MVP: (Sweden) Frida Eldebrink
- Top scorer: (South Korea) Kang (24.9)
- Top rebounds: (Mali) Coulibaly (15)
- Top assists: (Japan) Hayashi (7)
- PPG (Team): United States (90.0)
- RPG (Team): United States (53.2)
- APG (Team): Czech Republic (15.4)

Official website
- web.archive.org

The 2007 FIBA Under-19 World Championship for Women (Slovak: Majstrovstvá sveta FIBA žien do 19 rokov 2007) was hosted by Slovakia from 26 July to 5 August 2007. Teams played a round robin schedule, with the top four teams of the eighth-final four advancing to the knockout stage.

== Overview ==
The United States won their third title. The other medalists in the tournament were Sweden (silver) and Serbia (bronze). Sweden's Frida Eldebrink was chosen as the tournaments MVP with an average of 18.4 PPG.

== Venues ==
The tournament was played in two venues. It was held at the Inter Hala Pasienky and the Sibamac Arena NTC in Bratislava.

== Competing nations ==
FIBA Africa (2)

- Mali
- Ivory Coast

FIBA Asia (3)

- China
- Japan
- South Korea

FIBA Americas (4)

- Argentina
- Brazil
- Canada
- United States

FIBA Oceania (1)

- Australia

FIBA Europe (5)

- Slovakia (Host Nation)
- Sweden
- Serbia
- Spain
- Lithuania
- Czech Republic

== Groups ==
Group A	Group B	Group C	Group D
Slovakia; South Korea; Spain; Argentina	United States; China; Lithuania; Ivory Coast	Canada; Japan; Czech Republic; Serbia	Brazil; Mali; Sweden; Australia

== Preliminary round ==
Times given below are in Central European Time

=== Group A ===
Team	Pld	W	L	PF	PA	PD	Pts
Slovakia	3	3	0	220	194	+26	6
Spain	3	2	1	224	160	+64	5
South Korea	3	1	2	191	243	–52	4
Argentina	3	0	3	187	225	–38	3

July 26
15:45

Report

Argentina	54–67	Spain
Scoring by quarter: 9-18, 14-6, 16-18, 15-25
Pts: Thomas 15; Rebs: Castillo 5 Asts: Castillo 2		Pts: Torrens 24; Rebs: Nicholls 24; Asts: Torrens 3

Sibamac Arena NTC, Bratislava

July 26
18:00

Report

Slovakia	75–72	South Korea
Scoring by quarter: 14-15, 22-15, 19-14, 20-28
Pts: Palusna 20; Rebs: Tetemondová 18; Asts: Kovalova 3		Pts: Kang 22; Rebs: Lee 9 Asts: Park 4

Sibamac Arena NTC, Bratislava

July 27
13:30

Report

South Korea	80–68	Argentina
Scoring by quarter: 15-25, 25-11, 21-22, 19-10
Pts: Kang 38; Rebs: Lee 11; Asts: Go 2		Pts: Thomas 20; Rebs: Thomas 8 Asts: Zinna 4

Sibamac Arena NTC, Bratislava

July 27
18:00

Report

Spain	57–67	Slovakia
Scoring by quarter: 18-13, 10-20, 18-13, 11-21
Pts: Abalde 12; Rebs: De La Fuente Valdizan 6 Asts: Ocete Castillo 3		Pts: Mincikova 20; Rebs: Mincikova 10; Asts: Slimakova 5

Sibamac Arena NTC, Bratislava

July 28
13:30

Report

South Korea	39–100	Spain
Scoring by quarter: 6-28, 6-24, 19-22, 8-26
Pts: Kang 22; Rebs: Lee 7 Asts: Lee 3		Pts: Herrera 16; Rebs: Nicholls 10; Asts: Ocete Castillo 5

Sibamac Arena NTC, Bratislava

July 28
18:00

Report

Argentina	65–78	Slovakia
Scoring by quarter: 14-24, 19-15, 18-19, 14-20
Pts: Thomas 25; Rebs: Thomas 11; Asts: Pesante 5		Pts: Palusna 22; Rebs: Palusna 18; Asts: Mincikova 6

Sibamac Arena NTC, Bratislava

=== Group B ===
Team	Pld	W	L	PF	PA	PD	Pts
United States	3	3	0	286	135	+151	6
China	3	2	1	211	188	+23	5
Lithuania	3	1	2	182	190	-8	4
Ivory Coast	3	0	3	107	263	-156	3

July 26
17:30

Report

China	67–48	Lithuania
Scoring by quarter: 21-8, 20-13, 12-17, 14-10
Pts: Ding 14; Rebs: Zeng 16; Asts: Zeng 16		Pts: Miliauskaite 10; Rebs: Jasiunskaite 13; Asts: Solopova 1

Sibamac Arena NTC, Bratislava

July 26
20:15

Report

Ivory Coast	25–95	United States
Scoring by quarter: 5-30, 5-21, 8-22, 7-22
Pts: Kouyate 10; Rebs: Kouyate 9 Asts: Kassi 2		Pts: Thomas 17; Rebs: Thomas 12; Asts: Lucas 6

Sibamac Arena NTC, Bratislava

July 27
15:45

Report

United States	101–60	China
Scoring by quarter: 25-14, 21-21, 21-22, 34-3
Pts: Thomas 17; Rebs: Baugh 11; Asts: Thomas 5		Pts: Zeng 12; Rebs: Zeng 7 Asts: Yang 2

Sibamac Arena NTC, Bratislava

July 27
20:15

Report

Lithuania	84–33	Ivory Coast
Scoring by quarter: 14-3, 18-11, 25-12, 27-7
Pts: Vasciunaite 14; Rebs: Jasiunskaite 15; Asts: Narviciute 3		Pts: Kolga 8 Rebs: Kouyate 9 Asts: Kolga 3

Sibamac Arena NTC, Bratislava

July 28
15:45

Report

China	84–49	Ivory Coast
Scoring by quarter: 25-7, 20-15, 18-16, 21-11
Pts: Zeng 21; Rebs: Wei 8 Asts: Wu 5		Pts: Kolga 23; Rebs: Kone 9 Asts: Kassi 1

Sibamac Arena NTC, Bratislava

July 28
20:15

Report

United States	90–50	Lithuania
Scoring by quarter: 24-15, 33-12, 20-17, 13-6
Pts: Lavender 16; Rebs: DeHaan 9 Asts: Lucas 4		Pts: Solopova 13; Rebs: Miliauskaite 8 Asts: Narviciute 3

Sibamac Arena NTC, Bratislava

=== Group C ===
Team	Pld	W	L	PF	PA	PD	Pts
Serbia	3	3	0	258	223	+35	6
Czech Republic	3	2	1	247	227	+20	5
Canada	3	1	2	197	218	-21	4
Japan	3	0	3	252	286	-34	3

July 26
15:45

Report

Serbia	79–63	Canada
Scoring by quarter: 26-13, 21-20, 21-20, 11-10
Pts: Milovanovic 16; Rebs: Petrovic 8 Asts: Petrovic 5		Pts: Ayim 12; Rebs: Ayim 9 Asts: Pilypaitis 4

SH Pasienky, Bratislava

July 26
18:00

Report

Japan	91–109	Czech Republic
Scoring by quarter: 26-29, 17-22, 23-29, 25-29
Pts: Nakahata 23; Rebs: Mori 12; Asts: Nakahata 3		Pts: Elhotova 24; Rebs: Stepanova 15; Asts: Bartonová 5

SH Pasienky, Bratislava

July 27
13:30

Report

Canada	74–72	Japan
Scoring by quarter: 15-17, 22-7, 16-14, 21-34
Pts: Boogaard 25; Rebs: Ayim 15; Asts: Watts 4		Pts: Fukushi 19; Rebs: Takahashi 4 Asts: Hayashi 9

SH Pasienky, Bratislava

July 27
20:15

Report

Czech Republic	71–76	Serbia
Scoring by quarter: 17-29, 17-12, 16-19, 21-16
Pts: Hejdova 26; Rebs: Elhotova 6 Asts: Giacintova 4		Pts: Petrovic 23; Rebs: Milovanovic 11; Asts: Miljkovic 3

SH Pasienky, Bratislava

July 28
18:00

Report

Czech Republic	67–60	Canada
Scoring by quarter: 11-20, 15-13, 18-21, 23-6
Pts: Hejdova 20; Rebs: Stepanova 7 Asts: Giacintova 2		Pts: Boogaard 15; Rebs: Ayim 14; Asts: Ross 4

SH Pasienky, Bratislava

July 28
18:00

Report

Serbia	103–89	Japan
Scoring by quarter: 30-12, 17-36, 19-22, 37-19
Pts: Gobeljic 27; Rebs: Gobeljic 12; Asts: Miljkovic 3		Pts: Nakahata 28; Rebs: Mori 15; Asts: Hayashi 9

SH Pasienky, Bratislava

=== Group D ===
Team	Pld	W	L	PF	PA	PD	Pts
Australia	3	3	0	236	184	+52	6
Sweden	3	2	1	238	209	+29	5
Brazil	3	1	2	198	208	-10	4
Mali	3	0	3	183	254	-71	3

July 26
13:30

Report

Mali	70–94	Sweden
Scoring by quarter: 20-24, 18-30, 16-14, 16-26
Pts: Coulibaly 19; Rebs: Keita 22; Asts: Coulibaly 2		Pts: Eldebrink 30; Rebs: Aili 9 Asts: Aili 6

SH Pasienky, Bratislava

July 26
20:15

Report

Brazil	51–84	Australia
Scoring by quarter: 12-22, 10-27, 17-18, 12-17
Pts: Teixeira Ribeiro 11; Rebs: Gomes Colhado 8 Asts: Braghin 2		Pts: George 20; Rebs: George 10; Asts: Hunt 4

SH Pasienky, Bratislava

July 27
15:45

Report

Sweden	76–67	Brazil
Scoring by quarter: 19-19, 18-17, 20-15, 19-16
Pts: Eldebrink 25; Rebs: Eldebrink 7 Asts: Eldebrink 5		Pts: Okou Zouzouo 16; Rebs: Gomes Colhado 11; Asts: Braghin 2

SH Pasienky, Bratislava

July 27
20:15

Report

Australia	80–65	Mali
Scoring by quarter: 22-18, 16-9, 24-16, 18-22
Pts: Bishop 13; Rebs: Manou 12; Asts: Martin 4		Pts: Bagayoko 21; Rebs: Coulibaly 14; Asts: Toure 4

SH Pasienky, Bratislava

July 28
13:30

Report

Mali	48–80	Brazil
Scoring by quarter: 9-15, 8-21, 11-24, 20-20
Pts: Toure 12; Rebs: Coulibaly 11; Asts: Bagayoko 1		Pts: Brito Santos 13; Rebs: Gomes Colhado 8 Asts: Braghin 3

SH Pasienky, Bratislava

July 28
15:45

Report

Australia	72–68	Sweden
Scoring by quarter: 14-13, 25-17, 16-18, 17-20
Pts: George 24; Rebs: Bishop 8 Asts: Bishop 4		Pts: Eldebrink 23; Rebs: Grahn 8 Asts: Eldebrink 1

SH Pasienky, Bratislava

== Eighth-final round ==
=== Group E ===
Team	Pld	W	L	PF	PA	PD	Pts
United States	6	6	0	557	330	+270	12
Slovakia	6	5	1	420	385	+35	11
Spain	6	4	2	447	339	+108	10
South Korea	6	3	3	420	500	-80	9
China	6	2	4	394	419	-25	8
Lithuania	6	2	4	355	426	-71	8

30 July 2007
18:00

Report

Lithuania	46–74	Slovakia
Scoring by quarter: 3–18, 10–17, 10–24, 23–15
Pts: Solopova 12; Rebs: Solopova 7 Asts: Narviciute 2		Pts: Pindrochova 14; Rebs: Krc-Turbová 8 Asts: Tetemondová 4

Sibamac Arena NTC, Bratislava
Attendance: 2000

30 July 2007
20:15

Report

United States	113–69	South Korea
Scoring by quarter: 33–13, 24–17, 29–24, 27–15
Pts: Lavender 16; Rebs: Thomas 13; Asts: Lucas 6		Pts: Kang 16; Rebs: Kim 6 Asts: Lee 5

Sibamac Arena NTC, Bratislava
Attendance: 2000

30 July 2007
20:15

Report

China	59–88	Spain
Scoring by quarter: 11–21, 16–15, 18–20, 14–32
Pts: Cao 13; Rebs: Zeng 6 Asts: Yang 2		Pts: Torrens 33; Rebs: Nichols 14; Asts: Torrens 6

SH Pasienky, Bratislava
Attendance: 2000

31 July 2007
18:00

Report

Slovakia	66–61	China
Scoring by quarter: 10–10, 16–19, 25–16, 15–16
Pts: Palusna 17; Rebs: Palusna 19; Asts: Palusna 3		Pts: Yang 14; Rebs: Cao 8 Asts: Yang 4

Sibamac Arena NTC, Bratislava
Attendance: 2000

31 July 2007
18:00

Report

South Korea	93–81	Lithuania
Scoring by quarter: 21–24, 23–14, 31–28, 18–15
Pts: Kang 41; Rebs: Kim 7 Asts: Kim 7		Pts: Miliauskaite 26; Rebs: Rickeviciute 17; Asts: Vasciunaite 3

SH Pasienky, Bratislava
Attendance: 2000

31 July 2007
20:15

Report

Spain	66–74	United States
Scoring by quarter: 20–23, 17–14, 15–15, 14–22
Pts: Torrens 18; Rebs: Nichols 13; Asts: Ocete Castillo 4		Pts: Lavender 28; Rebs: Lavender 13; Asts: Wright 7

Sibamac Arena NTC, Bratislava
Attendance: 2000

1 August 2007
13:30

Report

China	63–67	South Korea
Scoring by quarter: 18–13, 14–19, 17–19, 14–16
Pts: Wu 13; Rebs: Liu 9 Asts: Cao 3		Pts: Kang 20; Rebs: Lee 11; Asts: Bae 6

Sibamac Arena NTC, Bratislava
Attendance: 2000

1 August 2007
15:45

Report

Lithuania	46–69	Spain
Scoring by quarter: 11–18, 4–15, 17–12, 14–24
Pts: Solopova 15; Rebs: Rickeviciute 9 Asts: Miliauskaite 1		Pts: Abalde 15; Rebs: Abalde 7 Asts: Sinol Gispert 5

Sibamac Arena NTC, Bratislava
Attendance: 2000

1 August 2007
18:00

Report

United States	84–60	Slovakia
Scoring by quarter: 25–17, 24–17, 22–20, 13–6
Pts: Moore 24; Rebs: Lavender 11; Asts: Lechlitner 5		Pts: Palusna 21; Rebs: Palusna 7 Asts: Palusna 3

Sibamac Arena NTC, Bratislava
Attendance: 2000

=== Group F ===
Team	Pld	W	L	PF	PA	PD	Pts
Serbia	6	6	0	465	386	+79	12
Australia	6	5	1	448	382	+46	11
Sweden	6	4	2	435	383	+52	10
Czech Republic	6	3	3	474	462	+12	9
Brazil	6	2	4	402	444	-42	8
Canada	6	1	5	371	433	-62	7

30 July 2007
13:30

Report

Australia	70–55	Canada
Scoring by quarter: 13–13, 25–16, 12–14, 20–12
Pts: George 16; Rebs: George 10; Asts: Ebzery 3		Pts: Ross 10; Rebs: Ross 12; Asts: Burke 3

Sibamac Arena NTC, Bratislava
Attendance: 2000

30 July 2007
15:45

Report

Brazil	57–82	Serbia
Scoring by quarter: 6–19, 18–21, 19–18, 14–24
Pts: Dos Santos 19; Rebs: Dos Santos 15; Asts: Braghin 1		Pts: Milovanovic 20; Rebs: Matovic 6 Asts: Miljkovic 3

Sibamac Arena NTC, Bratislava
Attendance: 2000

30 July 2007
18:00

Report

Sweden	78–64	Czech Republic
Scoring by quarter: 15–14, 16–18, 15–11, 32–21
Pts: Eldebrink 24; Rebs: Grahn 9 Asts: Aili 3		Pts: Elhotova 15; Rebs: Bartonová 7 Asts: Bartonová 4

SH Pasienky, Bratislava
Attendance: 2000

31 July 2007
18:00

Report

Canada	70–75	Brazil
Scoring by quarter: 17–6, 11–24, 22–14, 20–31
Pts: Ayim 16; Rebs: Ross 13; Asts: Watts 4		Pts: Sousa Silva 20; Rebs: Gomes Colhado 9 Asts: Sousa Silva 6

Sibamac Arena NTC, Bratislava
Attendance: 2000

31 July 2007
15:45

Report

Serbia	78–64	Sweden
Scoring by quarter: 15–11, 13–11, 18–15, 15–12
Pts: Miljkovic 16; Rebs: Gobeljic 7 Asts: Miljkovic 4		Pts: Halvarsson 16; Rebs: Halvarsson 5 Asts: Eldebrink 2

Sibamac Arena NTC, Bratislava
Attendance: 2000

31 July 2007
20:15

Report

Czech Republic	79–85	Australia
Scoring by quarter: 14–17, 26–20, 20–23, 19–25
Pts: Ovsíková 17; Rebs: Stepanova 10; Asts: Elhotova 2		Pts: George 20; Rebs: Bishop 13; Asts: Tolo 1

SH Pasienky, Bratislava
Attendance: 2000

1 August 2007
13:30

Report

Sweden	70–49	Canada
Scoring by quarter: 20–11, 22–15, 14–11, 14–12
Pts: Yderström 12; Rebs: Johansson 5 Asts: Aili 3		Pts: Ayim 10; Rebs: Ayim 8 Asts: Burke 3

SH Pasienky, Bratislava
Attendance: 2000

1 August 2007
15:45

Report

Brazil	72–84	Czech Republic
Scoring by quarter: 18–24, 16–16, 12–24, 26–20
Pts: Sousa Silva 14; Rebs: Dos Santos 9 Asts: Braghin 4		Pts: Elhotova 23; Rebs: Sipova 11; Asts: Ovsíková 6

SH Pasienky, Bratislava
Attendance: 2000

1 August 2007
18:00

Report

Australia	57–64	Serbia
Scoring by quarter: 18–16, 17–12, 10–17, 12–19
Pts: Bishop 14; Rebs: Bishop 9 Asts: Ebzery 3		Pts: Milovanovic 23; Rebs: Milovanovic 9 Asts: Gobeljic 2

SH Pasienky, Bratislava
Attendance: 2000

== Knockout stage ==
=== Bracket ===
Quarter-finals
August 3
Slovakia	65
Sweden	68
August 3
Serbia	74
South Korea	62
August 3
United States	85
Czech Republic	66
August 3
Australia	69
Spain	72

Semi-finals
August 4
Sweden	85
Serbia	75
August 4
United States	69
Spain	46

Final
August 5
Sweden	57
United States	99
Third place
August 5
Serbia	52
Spain	50

5th place bracket

Semi-finals
August 4
Slovakia	92
South Korea	66
August 4
Czech Republic	66
Australia	89

Fifth place
August 5
Slovakia	54
Australia	64
Seventh place
August 5
South Korea	87
Czech Republic	101

9th place bracket

Semi-finals
August 3
Brazil	77
Lithuania	64
August 3
China	64
Canada	75

Ninth place
August 4
Brazil	66
Canada	68
Eleventh place
August 4
Lithuania	68
China	73

13th place bracket

Semi-finals
July 30
Argentina	73
Ivory Coast	55
July 30
Japan	87
Mali	72

Thirteenth place
July 31
Argentina	72
Japan	74
Fifteenth place
July 31
Ivory Coast	32
Mali	63

=== Quarterfinals ===
3 August 2007
13:30

Report

United States	85–66	Czech Republic
Scoring by quarter: 21–23, 21–14, 22–16, 21–13
Pts: Lavender 25; Rebs: DeHaan 11; Asts: Thomas 4		Pts: Elhotova 18; Rebs: Sipova 9 Asts: Elhotova 3

Sibamac Arena NTC, Bratislava

3 August 2007
16:30

Report

Spain	72–69	Australia
Scoring by quarter: 10–19, 20–24, 25–7, 17–19
Pts: Torrens 22; Rebs: Abalde 10; Asts: Carbo Coloma 2		Pts: Bishop 19; Rebs: Bishop 14; Asts: Hunt 5

Sibamac Arena NTC, Bratislava

3 August 2007
18:00

Report

Slovakia	65–68	Sweden
Scoring by quarter: 17–23, 17–16, 19–7, 12–22
Pts: Palusna 25; Rebs: Palusna 19; Asts: Palusna 3		Pts: Eldebrink 23; Rebs: Eldebrink 8 Asts: Eldebrink 6

Sibamac Arena NTC, Bratislava

3 August 2007
20:15

Report

Serbia	74–62	South Korea
Scoring by quarter: 16–19, 18–13, 18–16, 22–14
Pts: Ivkovic 15; Rebs: Ivkovic 13; Asts: Ivkovic 5		Pts: Kang 20; Rebs: Lee 3 Asts: Lee 2

Sibamac Arena NTC, Bratislava

=== Classification 13–16 ===
30 July 2007
13:30

Report

Argentina	73–55	Ivory Coast
Scoring by quarter: 22–17, 11–17, 21–12, 19–9
Pts: Boquete 24; Rebs: Boquete 13; Asts: Boquete 3		Pts: Kolga 23; Rebs: Kolga 13; Asts: Kouyate 3

SH Pasienky, Bratislava

30 July 2007
18:00

Report

Japan	87–72	Mali
Scoring by quarter: 22–25, 20–12, 26–17, 19–18
Pts: Hayashi 26; Rebs: Fukushi 13; Asts: Hayashi 10		Pts: Coulibaly 25; Rebs: Coulibaly 26; Asts: Bagayoko 2

SH Pasienky, Bratislava

=== Classification 9–12 ===
3 August 2007
09:00

Report

Brazil	77–64	Lithuania
Scoring by quarter: 20–14, 21–15, 22–16, 14–19
Pts: Sousa Silva 13 (9rbs), Sousa Silva (4ast); Rebs: Caetano de Souza 9 Asts: Sousa Silva 4		Pts: Rickeviciute 33; Rebs: Mazeikaite 7 Asts: Povilionyte 2

Sibamac Arena NTC, Bratislava

3 August 2007
11:15

Report

China	64–75	Canada
Scoring by quarter: 19–14, 13–13, 18–24, 14–24
Pts: Cao 17; Rebs: Wei 7 Asts: Wu 5		Pts: Boogaard 22; Rebs: Ayim 13; Asts: Burke 5

Sibamac Arena NTC, Bratislava

=== Classification 5–8 ===
4 August 2007
13:30

Report

Czech Republic	66–84	Australia
Pts: Stepanova 17; Rebs: Stepanova 9 Asts: Hejdova 3		Pts: Bishop 25; Rebs: Bishop 17; Asts: Gaze 4

Sibamac Arena NTC, Bratislava

4 August 2007
15:45

Report

Slovakia	92–66	South Korea
Pts: Palusna 20; Rebs: Palusna 19; Asts: Mincikova 3		Pts: Kang 27; Rebs: Lee 8 Asts: Lee 4

Sibamac Arena NTC, Bratislava
Attendance: 1000

=== Semifinals ===
4 August 2007
18:00

Report

Sweden	85–75	Serbia
Scoring by quarter: 20–22, 22–20, 14–21, 29–12
Pts: Eldebrink 23; Rebs: Eldebrink 9 Asts: Eldebrink 6		Pts: Gobeljic; Rebs: Miljkovic; Asts: Petrovic

Sibamac Arena NTC, Bratislava
Attendance: 1000

4 August 2007
20:15

Report

United States	69–46	Spain
Scoring by quarter: 20–14, 12–10, 23–15, 14–7
Pts: Moore 24; Rebs: Baugh 9 Asts: Thomas 4		Pts: Nicholls 11; Rebs: De La Fuente Valdizan 8 Asts: Nicholls 3

Sibamac Arena NTC, Bratislava
Attendance: 1000

=== Fifteenth place game ===
31 July 2007
13:30

Report

Ivory Coast	32–63	Mali
Scoring by quarter: 7–9, 4–22, 10–18, 11–14
Pts: Kouyate 17; Rebs: Komenan 8 Asts: Kouyate 1		Pts: Bagayoko 19; Rebs: Toure 10; Asts: Traore 2

SH Pasienky, Bratislava

=== Thirteenth place game ===
31 July 2007
15:45

Report

Argentina	72–74	Japan
Scoring by quarter: 14–20, 16–21, 22–20, 20–13
Pts: Gonzalez 19; Rebs: Pavicich 11; Asts: Pavicich 2		Pts: Nakahata 23; Rebs: Nakahata 10; Asts: Nakahata 6

SH Pasienky, Bratislava

=== Eleventh place game ===
4 August 2007
09:00

Report

Lithuania	68–73	China
Scoring by quarter: 19–17, 13–19, 19–16, 17–21
Pts: Rickeviciute 28; Rebs: Paugaite 17; Asts: Solopova 3		Pts: Ding 24; Rebs: Zeng 10; Asts: Yang 4

Sibamac Arena NTC, Bratislava

=== Ninth place game ===
4 August 2007
11:15

Report

Brazil	66–68 (OT)	Canada
Scoring by quarter: 10–11, 19–11, 15–14, 12–20, Overtime: 10-12
Pts: Teixeira Ribeiro 14; Rebs: Caetano de Souza 14; Asts: Sousa Silva 3		Pts: Ross 13; Rebs: Ross 15; Asts: Watts 3

Sibamac Arena NTC, Bratislava

=== Seventh place game ===
5 August 2007
13:30

Report

Czech Republic	101–87	South Korea
Scoring by quarter: 35–17, 24–22, 28–26, 14–22
Pts: Sipova 24; Rebs: Sipova 9 Asts: Giacintova 7		Pts: Kang 32; Rebs: Kim 10; Asts: Park 4

Sibamac Arena NTC, Bratislava

=== Fifth place game ===
5 August 2007
15:45

Report

Australia	64–54	Slovakia
Scoring by quarter: 16–11, 17–12, 19–18, 12–13
Pts: Tolo 16; Rebs: Bishop 7 Asts: Ebzery 4		Pts: Krc-Turbová 18; Rebs: Krc-Turbová 7 Asts: Mincikova 5

Sibamac Arena NTC, Bratislava
Attendance: 2000

=== Third place game ===
5 August 2007
18:00

Report

Serbia	52–50	Spain
Scoring by quarter: 14–6, 13–12, 11–14, 14–18
Pts: Milovanovic 17; Rebs: Petrovic 12; Asts: Miljkovic 5		Pts: Carbo Coloma 13; Rebs: Nicholls 9 Asts: Carbo Coloma 2

Sibamac Arena NTC, Bratislava

=== Final ===
5 August 2007
20:15

Report

Sweden	57–99	United States
Scoring by quarter: 18–33, 15–22, 7–17, 17–27
Pts: Halvarsson 12; Rebs: Halvarsson 7 Asts: Eldebrink 3		Pts: Moore 19; Rebs: Moore 13; Asts: Moore 6

Sibamac Arena NTC, Bratislava
Attendance: 3000

== Statistical leaders ==
Points

Name	PPG
(South Korea) Kang A-jeong	24.9
(Argentina) Sthefany Thomas	19.4
(Japan) Eri Nakahata	19.4
(Sweden) Frida Eldebrink	18.4
(Serbia) Jelena Milovanovic	17.3

Rebounds

Name	RPG
(Mali) Naignouma Coulibaly	15.0
(Mali) Minata Keita	12.6
(Slovakia) Regina Palusna	12.2
(Australia) Abby Bishop	10.7
(Spain) Laura Nicholls	10.3

Assists

Name	APG
(Japan) Naomi Hayashi	7.0
(Sweden) Elin Eldebrink	3.4
(Japan) Eri Nakahata	3.4
(South Korea) Lee Eun-hye	3.3
(Czech Republic) Gabriela Giacintova	3.3

Blocks

Name	BPG
(Slovakia) Regina Palusna	2.7
(United States) Allyssa Marie DeHaan	2.1
(Australia) Cayla George	1.6
(Serbia) Jelena Milovanovic	1.4
(Brazil) Nadia Gomes Colhado	1.4

Steals

Name	SPG
(Japan) Naomi Hayashi	3.6
(Japan) Eri Nakahata	3.4
(Mali) Fatoumata Bagayoko	2.8
(Slovakia) Regina Palusna	2.4
(Sweden) Frida Eldebrink	2.3

== Final standings ==
Rank	Team
1st place, gold medalist(s)	United States
2nd place, silver medalist(s)	Sweden
3rd place, bronze medalist(s)	Serbia
4th	Spain
5th	Australia
6th	Slovakia
7th	Czech Republic
8th	South Korea
9th	Canada
10th	Brazil
11th	China
12th	Lithuania
13th	Japan
14th	Argentina
15th	Mali
16th	Ivory Coast

== Awards ==
2007 Under-19 World Championship for Women winner

United States
Third title

Most Valuable Player
(Sweden) Frida Eldebrink
