= Ana Radović =

Ana Radović may refer to:

- Ana Radović (handballer) (born 1986), Montenegrin women's handball player
- Ana Radović (basketball, born 1990), Serbian women's basketball player
- Ana Radović (basketball, born 1997), Bosnian women's basketball player
