= Allyssa DeHaan =

American basketball player

Personal information
- Born: June 21, 1988 (age 38) Grand Rapids, Michigan, U.S.
- Listed height: 6 ft 9 in (2.06 m)
- Listed weight: 180 lb (82 kg)

Career information
- High school: Grandville High School
- College: Michigan State University; Grand Valley State University
- Playing career: 2006–2010
- Position: Center
- Number: 41

Career highlights
- Big Ten Defensive Player of the Year (2010); 4x Big Ten All-Defensive Team (2007–2010); 2x First-team All-Big Ten (2007, 2008); Big Ten Freshman of the Year (2007); Big Ten All-Freshman Team (2007); Michigan Miss Basketball (2005); Set Big Ten single-season blocks record with 150 in 07-08; Ranked third all-time in Division I with 503 career blocks
Medals
Women's basketball
Representing the United States
FIBA Under-19 World Cup
Gold medal – first place	2007 Slovakia	Team

Allyssa DeHaan (born June 21, 1988) is an American former collegiate basketball and volleyball player. She played for Michigan State University from 2006 to 2010.

She is ranked as the fourth all-time in career points (1,649) and rebounds (919), and is one of just three Spartans to place in the top five of both categories. She also ranks third in MSU history in made field goals (640) and made free throws (351), and seventh in free throw percentage (79.8%). DeHaan finished her career with four-year averages of 12.1 points, 6.8 rebounds, and 3.7 blocks per game. She is also ranked third all-time in Division I with 503 career blocks.

DeHaan is 6 feet 9 inches (2.06 m) tall, making her one of the tallest female basketball players in the country and the tallest player in Michigan State history.

== Early life ==
DeHaan was born on June 21, 1988, in Grand Rapids, Michigan, the daughter of Tracia and Brandon DeHaan. Her athletic life began with gymnastics in preschool. She also tried ballet, ice skating, swimming, tee ball and volleyball before she ever picked up a basketball in fifth grade. When some parents of AAU players walked into the gym and saw her doing gymnastics, they asked her to join their basketball team, to which DeHaan agreed. She also started playing pickup games in the driveway with her mom, who played basketball at Northwestern University.

DeHaan has always been tall. Her parents are also tall; her father is 6 ft 6 in and her mother is 6 ft 4 in, but Allyssa outgrew both of them. In middle school, she had already reached 6 ft 2 in and rapidly grew another six inches in just under a year, between sixth and seventh grade. She was 6 ft 7 in as a high school sophomore and graduated from Grandville High School at 6 ft 8 in. Already the tallest female player in Michigan State history when she joined the basketball team, she unexpectedly grew another inch before playing her first season at 6 ft 9 in. DeHaan is not afflicted with Marfan syndrome or any other kind of overgrowth syndrome. She has a 39-inch inseam, and she wears a men's size 11 (women's 13) shoes. Deeply religious, DeHaan attributes her great height as a divine gift given to her by God.

DeHaan has stated that she is "pretty used to drawing eyes in public because I've always been pretty tall." She admits that buying clothes can be difficult and time-consuming, and that people are not always well-mannered when commenting on her height.

DeHaan's younger brother Collin is 6 ft 9 in tall.

== High school ==
DeHaan attended Grandville High School. She set the Michigan girls' high school single-season blocks record with 236 in her junior season. As a junior in 2004-2005 she averaged 27.0 ppg, 13.0 rpg. and 9.5 bpg. She led Grandville to a 22–2 record and conference, district and regional championships as a senior in 2005–06.

In November 2005 she was named Michigan Miss Basketball of 2005, an award given annually to the top senior high school basketball player in the state. She won with 816 points while her nearest rival had 502. DeHaan was also named the Gatorade State Player of the Year in 2005. She was ranked among the top 25 centers in the nation by All-Star Girls Report and named to The Grand Rapids Press all-area team.

DeHaan ranked second on the team in scoring, and, despite being a rookie, played a crucial role in keeping the team on track, guiding them to their first 3–0 mark in conference play since 1991. By the time she was a senior she had led Grandville to district and regional championships, averaging 24 points, nine rebounds and nine blocked shots a game. This led Grandville to the state quarterfinals for the first time in program history. She was also a member of the volleyball team and earned honorable mention all-conference honors.

== Michigan State ==
DeHaan's choice of university erupted into a national recruiting war, with offers coming from as far away as Tennessee, Connecticut, Purdue, Louisiana State, Duke and Kentucky. DeHaan chose Michigan State University (after narrowing her choices to Michigan State, Grand Valley State, and Cornerstone University) and had one of the most dominant freshman seasons in Big Ten history. DeHaan said she chose MSU because "I have the opportunity to win a national championship, and equally pursue another dream of becoming a doctor at the same time."

=== Freshman ===
In her collegiate debut on November 17, 2006, DeHaan scored a team-high 15 points. Two days later, she set a then-school-record with eight blocked shots, seven of which she made in the second half, as well as scoring her first career double-double in the game, scoring 11 points, and making 11 rebounds. On November 24, 2006, DeHaan scored 17 points and nine rebounds in a game her team won 85–66. Her dominance continued on November 29, 2006, when she made another career-high 28 points and 10 rebounds for her second career double-double, which was the second-highest game total for a freshman in Michigan State history.

In her first season, DeHaan earned spots on the All-Big Ten Second Team and the All-Big Ten Defensive Team, as well as the Big Ten All-Tournament Team.

On March 2, 2007, in a game against Minnesota where she was described as "unstoppable," Michigan State won a 77–68 victory.

DeHaan began her first season by setting a string of new school records, including smashing the school's previous single-season blocks record in her first twelve games. She scored 145 points, beating the previous record of 57 points set by Kristen Rasmussen. DeHaan's 69 blocks during Big Ten regular-season games was the third-best mark in the school's history, just 27 points behind Trish Andrew's mark of 96 set in the 1991–1992 season.

During the summer of 2007, DeHaan played at the 2007 FIBA Under-19 World Championship in Bratislava, Slovakia, leading the successful Team USA, which won a gold medal. DeHaan was ranked second amongst all players at the tournament with 19 blocks. In the tournament she averaged 5.0 points and 6.6 rebounds.

=== Sophomore ===
DeHaan had another record-breaking season as a sophomore. She became the fourth person in Michigan State women's basketball history to reach 300 points and 200 rebounds. To cap off her successful first season, DeHaan became the first ever MSU freshman to score over 400 points. She was named MSU Co-Player of the Year, with Kalisha Keane. She made 30 consecutive free throws during one stretch in 2007–08, the fourth-longest streak in MSU history. She was named Big Ten Player of the Week three times in 2007–08. On December 16, 2007, she became MSU's all-time leader in blocked shots. She reached the mark in just 43 career games. With three blocks on December 20, DeHaan became the fastest player in NCAA Division I history to reach the 200-block milestone while playing in her freshman and sophomore seasons.

=== Junior ===
DeHaan became the Big Ten career blocked shots leader, MSU's 19th 1,000-point scorer, and was named Second Team All-Big Ten by both the coaches and media. She appeared in all 33 games, and averaged 10.8 points, ranking her second on the team and 19th in the Big Ten. She added a team-bests in 6.3 rebounds (13th in the conference) and 3.2 blocks, Led the team and Big Ten with 107 blocks, placing her third in the nation and third on the MSU single-season list. She was second on the team and ninth in the Big Ten with a 46.5% field goal percentage. She had 18 double-figure scoring efforts and two double-doubles; she also added three double-digit rebounding games. She led MSU in scoring in 12 games (11-1 record) and rebounding in 12 games, Big Ten All-Defensive Team, Academic All-Big Ten, and ESPN The Magazine Academic All-District IV Second Team. She was named to the Berkeley Regional All-Tournament Team.

=== Senior ===
DeHaan averaged 10.6 points and 5.8 rebounds while blocking 101 shots during her senior season. She left Michigan State ranked as the fourth all-time in career points (1,649), rebounds (919), and is one of just three Spartans to place in the top five of both categories. She also ranks third in MSU history in made field goals (640) and made free throws (351), and seventh in free throw percentage (79.8%). DeHaan finished her career with four-year averages of 12.1 points, 6.8 rebounds, and 3.7 blocks per game. She is also ranked second all-time in Division I with 503 career blocks.

Shortly before the end of her final season in March, DeHaan was in a game when she was hit in the back and it flared up. She had played a mere eight minutes before leaving early in the first half with back spasms and did not return. It was later revealed that she was playing with a herniated disc.

DeHaan took a medical school placement test during the summer and returned to Michigan State in the fall to finish her degree in human biology. She graduated in December 2010.

=== Michigan State statistics ===
Legend
GP	Games played	GS	Games started	MPG	Minutes per game
FG%	Field goal percentage	3P%	3-point field goal percentage	FT%	Free throw percentage
RPG	Rebounds per game	APG	Assists per game	SPG	Steals per game
BPG	Blocks per game	PPG	Points per game	**Bold**	Career high

Year	Team	GP	Points	FG%	3P%	FT%	RPG	APG	SPG	BPG	PPG
2006-07	Michigan State	33	411	**53.0%**	0.0%	76.0%	**7.5**	**1.5**	**0.5**	**4.4**	12.5
2007-08	Michigan State	**37**	**531**	48.3%	30.0%	**83.8%**	7.3	1.5	0.4	4.1	**14.4**
2008-09	Michigan State	33	356	46.5%	**33.3%**	73.8%	6.3	0.7	0.4	3.2	10.8
2009-10	Michigan State	33	351	41.6%	**33.3%**	82.7%	5.8	0.9	0.2	3.1	10.6
Career		136	1649	47.4%	32.1%	79.8%	6.8	1.2	0.4	3.7	12.1

== USA Basketball ==
DeHaan was a member of the USA Women's U19 team which won the gold medal at the FIBA U19 World Championship in Bratislava, Slovakia. The event was held in July and August 2007, when the USA team defeated Sweden to win the championship. DeHaan helped the team the gold medal, scoring 5.0 points per game.

== Grand Valley State ==
In August 2011 DeHaan announced she would pursue her graduate studies further at Grand Valley State University and would be joining the university's volleyball team, the GVSU Lakers. She would first participate in the fall training camp, and stated that she would be available to play one full year of volleyball.

DeHaan had already planned on taking some prerequisite classes at GVSU, where she planned to apply in the physician assistant program, when she was approached by the Lakers coach Deanne Scanlon with the idea of joining, and DeHaan agreed. Her position was middle blocker. When asked what her greatest asset would be to the team, DeHaan replied confidently, "I'm 6-foot-9, I think that says it all right there." She was the tallest player on the roster. Allyssa spent one semester at Grand Valley State University in the Fall of 2011.

== Stats ==
=== College notes ===
- Set the Michigan State single-season blocks record with 236 blocks in her junior season
- Fourth freshman in Michigan State University's history to reach 300 points and 200 rebounds
- Named to The Grand Rapids Press all-area team for two straight years
- First MSU freshman to score 400-plus points
- She was named the 2007 Big Ten Conference Freshman of the Year, as well as being named to the All-Big Ten Defensive Team. She has also been named to All-Big Ten second team and the Big Ten All-Tournament Team. She was also selected the Two-time Big Ten Player of the Week.

=== GVSU Volleyball notes ===
- Against Missouri S&T, DeHaan had five kills, three block assists, and three digs.

== Personal life ==
Allyssa's husband, Aaron Clark proposed to her in the Grand Rapids Press through a proposal contest.
