= Tuğçe Canıtez =

Turkish basketball player

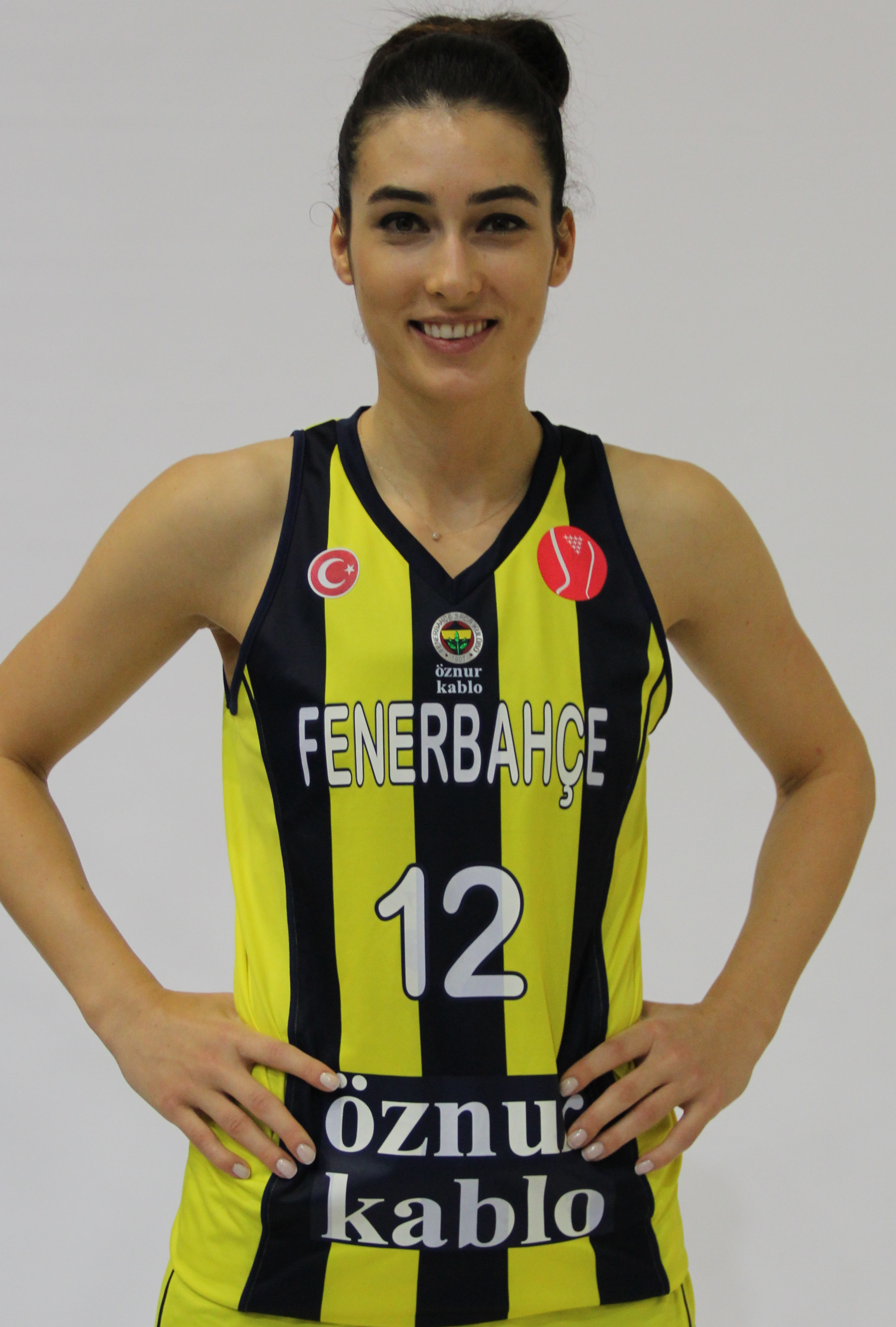
- Tuğçe Canıtez

Personal information
- Born: 10 November 1990 (age 36) Konak, Izmir, Turkey
- Listed height: 6 ft 3 in (1.91 m)
- Listed weight: 187 lb (85 kg)

Career information
- College: North Idaho College; Westmont College (2011–2013)
- WNBA draft: 2013: undrafted
- Position: Small forward

Career history
- 2013–2022: Fenerbahçe
- 2022: Hatay Büyükşehir Belediyespor
- 2022–2023: Galatasaray

Career highlights
- 5× Turkish Super League champion (2016, 2018, 2019, 2021, 2022); 4× Turkish Presidential Cup champion (2013, 2014, 2015, 2019); 4× Turkish Cup champion (2015, 2016, 2019, 2020)

Tuğçe Canıtez (born 10 November 1990) is a Turkish retired female professional basketball player. The 1.90 m (6 ft 3 in) tall athlete plays in the power forward position.

On 29 August 2023, Canıtez announced that she had ended her professional basketball career.

== Early years ==
She played for North Idaho College before she transferred to Westmont College.

== Club career ==
=== Fenerbahçe ===
Canitez played for Fenerbahçe between 2013 and 2022.

=== Hatay Büyükşehir Belediyespor ===
She signed a 1-year contract with Hatay Büyükşehir Belediyespor on 7 July 2022.

=== Galatasaray ===
On 28 November 2022, she signed with Galatasaray of the Turkish Women's Basketball Super League (TKBL).

As of July 2023, her contract has expired. Galatasaray club said goodbye to the player on July 6, 2023 by publishing a thank you message.

== International career ==
Canıtez debuted for the Turkey women's national basketball team at the preparation matches before she played at the 2012 FIBA World Olympic Qualifying Tournament for Women. She competed for Turkey at the 2012 and 2016 Summer Olympics.

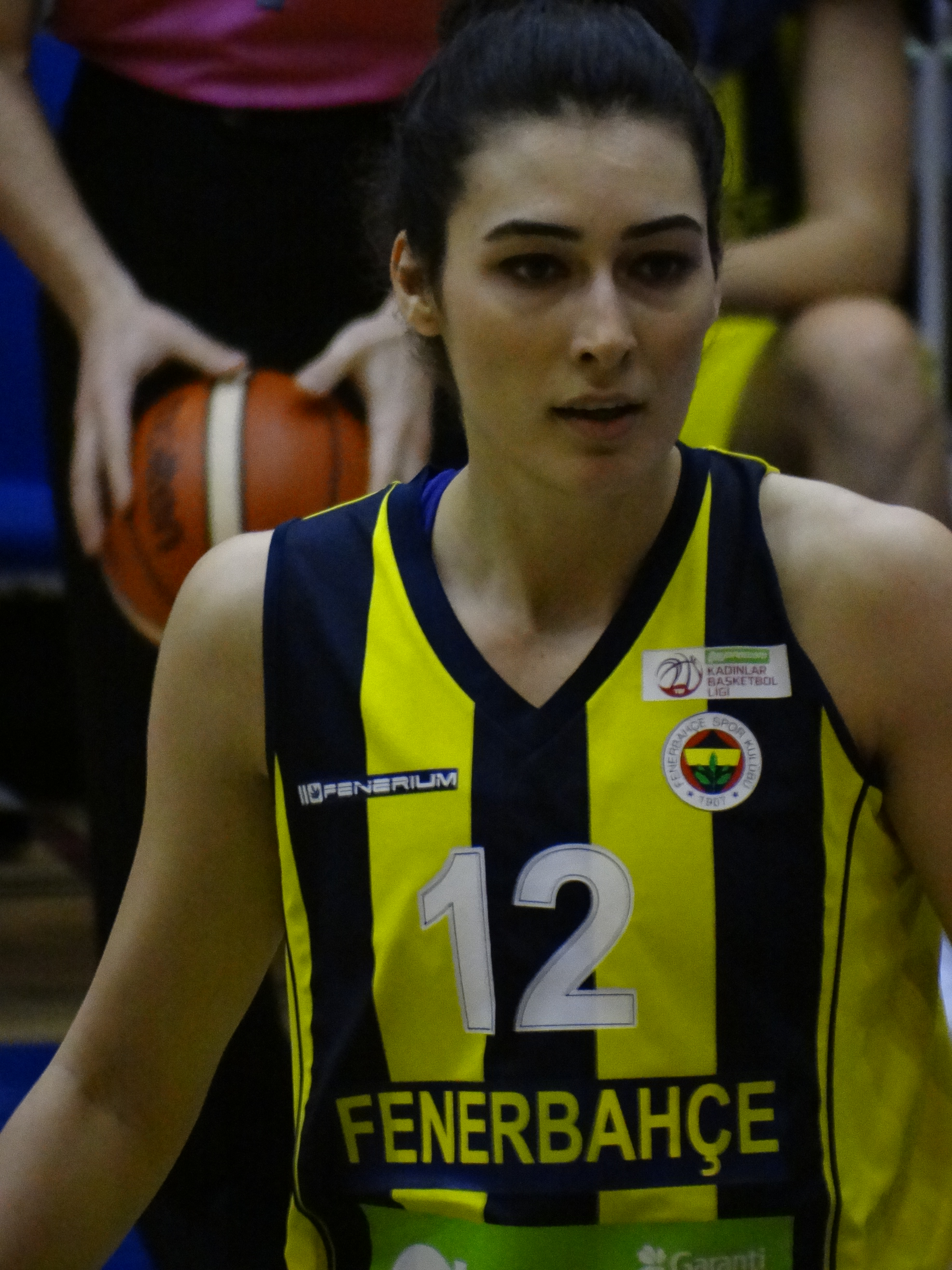
Tuğçe Canıtez playing for Fenerbahçe

== Honors ==
- 2010 second "Best Rebounder" FIBA Europe Under-20 Championship for Women
- 2012 "NAIA Player of the Year"
- 2020 Turkish Cup MVP

=== Club ===
- 5x Turkish Women's Basketball League champion (2016, 2018, 2019, 2021, 2022)
- 4x Turkish Women's Basketball Cup champion (2015, 2016, 2019, 2020)
- 4x Turkish Women's Basketball Presidential Cup champion (2013, 2014, 2015, 2019)
