= Yang Yumin =

Chinese footballer

Yang Yumin 杨玉敏
Personal information
- Full name: Yang Yumin
- Date of birth: 1 January 1955 (age 71)
- Place of birth: Dalian, Liaoning, China
- Height: 1.77 m (5 ft 9 1/2 in)
- Position: Forward

Senior career*
Years	Team	Apps	(Gls)
1972–1982	Liaoning FC		

International career
1977–1982	China	11	(0)

Managerial career
- 1992–1994: Liaoning FC
- 1996: Liaoning FC
- 1997: Liaoning FC
- 1998: Jiangsu Jiajia
- 2009: Shenyang Dongjin
- 2012: Shenyang Dongjin(caretaker)
Medal record
Men's football
Representing China
Asian Games
Bronze medal – third place	1978 Bangkok	Football
- * Club domestic league appearances and goals

Yang Yumin (Chinese: 杨玉敏; born 1 January 1955) is a former Chinese footballer who played for China PR in the 1980 Asian Cup. He spent all of his player career in Liaoning FC football team.

== Playing career ==
Yang Yumin start his footballer career at the age of 17. He spent all of his player career in Liaoning FC football team. In 1977, he was called up to China national football team, and represented for China in the 1980 Asian Cup and qualifying for the 1982 FIFA World Cup. Yang retired from football in 1982.

== Management career ==
Yang Yumin had ever worked as the coach of Liaoning FC football team third Place. From 1998 to 1999, Yang worked as the coach of Jiangsu football team. In 2009, he worked as caretaker coach of Shenyang Dongjin.

== Personal life ==
Yang Yumin's daughter Yang Banban is a basketball player.
