= Estonia women's national under-20 basketball team =

Estonia
- FIBA zone: FIBA Europe
- National federation: Estonian Basketball Association

U20 European Championship
- Appearances: None

U20 European Championship Division B
- Appearances: 1
- Medals: None

The Estonia women's national under-20 basketball team is a national basketball team of Estonia, administered by the Estonian Basketball Association. It represents the country in women's international under-20 basketball competitions.

== FIBA U20 Women's European Championship participations ==
Year	Result in Division B
2011	10th

== See also ==
- Estonia women's national basketball team
- Estonia women's national under-18 basketball team
- Estonia men's national under-20 basketball team
