= 2011 FIBA Europe Under-20 Championship for Women Division B =

Tournament details
- Host country: Republic of Macedonia
- City: Ohrid
- Dates: 8–17 July 2011
- Teams: 11 (from 1 confederation)
- Venue(s): 1 (in 1 host city)

Final positions
- Champions: Sweden (2nd title)
- Runners-up: Portugal
- Third place: Greece

Official website
- www.fibaeurope.com

The 2011 FIBA Europe Under-20 Championship for Women Division B was the seventh edition of the Division B of the Women's European basketball championship for national under-20 teams. It was held in Ohrid, Republic of Macedonia, from 8 to 17 July 2011. Sweden women's national under-20 basketball team won the tournament.

== Participating teams ==
- Austria
- Belgium
- Bulgaria ▼ (16th place, 2010 FIBA Europe Under-20 Championship for Women Division A)
- Czech Republic
- Estonia
- Greece
- Hungary
- Israel
- Macedonia
- Portugal
- Sweden ▼ (15th place, 2010 FIBA Europe Under-20 Championship for Women Division A)

== First round ==
In the first round, the teams were drawn into two groups. The first four teams from each group advance to the quarterfinals, the other teams will play in the classification round for 9th to 11th place.

=== Group A ===
Pos	Team	Pld	W	L	PF	PA	PD	Pts	Qualification
1	Sweden	4	4	0	318	200	+118	8	Quarterfinals
2	Portugal	4	3	1	263	237	+26	7	Quarterfinals
3	Hungary	4	2	2	249	240	+9	6	Quarterfinals
4	Bulgaria	4	1	3	225	301	−76	5	Quarterfinals
5	Macedonia	4	0	4	210	287	−77	4	Classification round for 9th–11th place

Source: FIBA Archive

8 July 2011

Boxscore

Portugal	72–58	Macedonia

8 July 2011

Boxscore

Hungary	73–58	Bulgaria

9 July 2011

Boxscore

Sweden	64–51	Hungary

9 July 2011

Boxscore

Bulgaria	49–74	Portugal

10 July 2011

Boxscore

Macedonia	54–66	Bulgaria

10 July 2011

Boxscore

Portugal	50–67	Sweden

12 July 2011

Boxscore

Hungary	63–67	Portugal

12 July 2011

Boxscore

Sweden	87–47	Macedonia

13 July 2011

Boxscore

Bulgaria	52–100	Sweden

13 July 2011

Boxscore

Macedonia	51–62	Hungary

=== Group B ===
Pos	Team	Pld	W	L	PF	PA	PD	Pts	Qualification
1	Czech Republic	5	5	0	348	248	+100	10	Quarterfinals
2	Greece	5	4	1	283	266	+17	9	Quarterfinals
3	Israel	5	3	2	286	280	+6	8	Quarterfinals
4	Belgium	5	2	3	276	298	−22	7	Quarterfinals
5	Austria	5	1	4	281	334	−53	6	Classification round for 9th–11th place
6	Estonia	5	0	5	263	311	−48	5	Classification round for 9th–11th place

Source: FIBA Archive

8 July 2011

Boxscore

Estonia	47–54	Czech Republic

8 July 2011

Boxscore

Austria	52–64	Greece

8 July 2011

Boxscore

Belgium	48–52	Israel

9 July 2011

Boxscore

Czech Republic	84–49	Austria

9 July 2011

Boxscore

Israel	60–59	Estonia

9 July 2011

Boxscore

Greece	53–47	Belgium

10 July 2011

Boxscore

Israel	58–61	Czech Republic

10 July 2011

Boxscore

Belgium	64–60	Austria

10 July 2011

Boxscore

Estonia	43–56	Greece

12 July 2011

Boxscore

Czech Republic	73–44	Belgium

12 July 2011

Boxscore

Greece	60–48	Israel

12 July 2011

Boxscore

Austria	68–54	Estonia

13 July 2011

Boxscore

Greece	50–76	Czech Republic

13 July 2011

Boxscore

Estonia	60–73	Belgium

13 July 2011

Boxscore

Israel	68–52	Austria

== Classification round for 9th–11th place ==
Pos	Team	Pld	W	L	PF	PA	PD	Pts
9	Austria	2	2	0	142	118	+24	4
10	Estonia	2	1	1	132	131	+1	3
11	Macedonia	2	0	2	124	149	−25	2

Source: FIBA Archive

15 July 2011

Boxscore

Macedonia	59–76	Austria

16 July 2011

Boxscore

Austria	66–59	Estonia

17 July 2011

Boxscore

Estonia	73–65	Macedonia

== Championship playoffs ==
Fifth place
A3	Hungary	66
B3	Israel	81
Seventh place
B4	Belgium	78
A4	Bulgaria	37

Consolation semifinals
B4	Belgium	72
A3	Hungary	79
A4	Bulgaria	57
B3	Israel	68

Quarterfinals
A1	Sweden	74
B4	Belgium	47
B2	Greece	55
A3	Hungary	48
B1	Czech Republic	67
A4	Bulgaria	42
A2	Portugal	60
B3	Israel	54

Semifinals
A1	Sweden	72
B2	Greece	70
B1	Czech Republic	60
A2	Portugal	63

Final
A1	Sweden	64
A2	Portugal	55
Third place
B2	Greece	60
B1	Czech Republic	59

=== Quarterfinals ===
15 July 2011

Boxscore

Sweden	74–47	Belgium

15 July 2011

Boxscore

Czech Republic	67–42	Bulgaria

15 July 2011

Boxscore

Portugal	60–54	Israel

15 July 2011

Boxscore

Greece	55–48	Hungary

=== 5th–8th place playoffs ===
16 July 2011

Boxscore

Belgium	72–79	Hungary

16 July 2011

Boxscore

Bulgaria	57–68	Israel

=== Semifinals ===
16 July 2011

Boxscore

Sweden	72–70	Greece

16 July 2011

Boxscore

Czech Republic	60–63	Portugal

=== 7th place match ===
17 July 2011

Boxscore

Belgium	78–37	Bulgaria

=== 5th place match ===
17 July 2011

Boxscore

Hungary	66–81	Israel

=== 3rd place match ===
17 July 2011

Boxscore

Greece	60–59	Czech Republic

=== Final ===
17 July 2011

Boxscore

Sweden	64–55	Portugal

== Final standings ==
Team promoted to the 2012 FIBA Europe Under-20 Championship for Women Division A

Rank	Team
1st place, gold medalist(s)	Sweden
2nd place, silver medalist(s)	Portugal
3rd place, bronze medalist(s)	Greece
4	Czech Republic
5	Israel
6	Hungary
7	Belgium
8	Bulgaria
9	Austria
10	Estonia
11	Macedonia
