= Sabīne Niedola =

Latvian basketball player

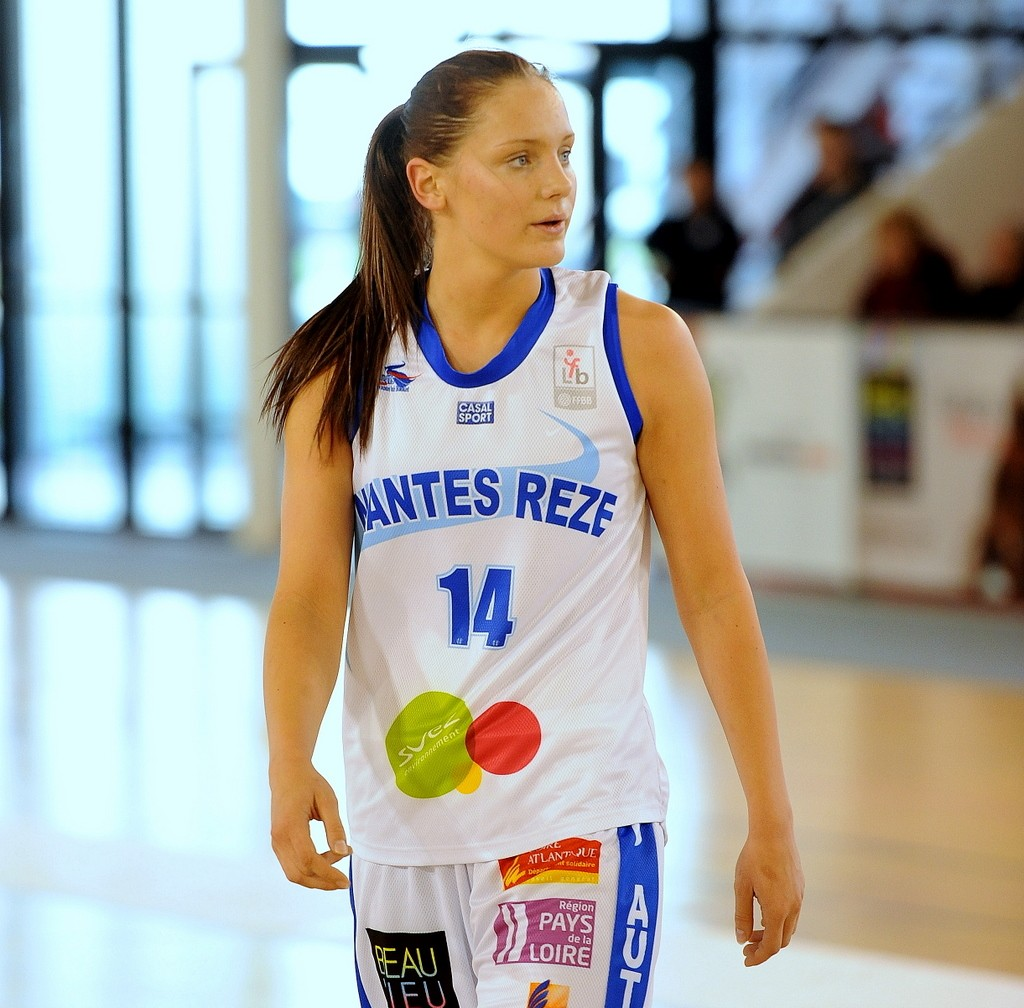

SK Cēsis
- Position: Power forward

Personal information
- Born: 29 April 1991 (age 35) Liepāja, Latvia
- Listed height: 6 ft 0 in (1.83 m)
- Listed weight: 149 lb (68 kg)

Career information
- Playing career: 2005–present

Sabīne Niedola (born 29 April 1991 in Liepāja) is a Latvian women's basketball player currently playing for SK Cēsis and the Latvian national team. She previously played for BK Liepājas Metalurgs and Nantes Rezé. Niedola contributed to the Latvian national team's success in the EuroBasket 2009.

== Club career ==
- (Latvia) Liepājas Metalurgs (2006–10), TTT Riga (2011)
- (France) Nantes Rezé (2010–11)
- (Spain) Sedís (2012–2014)
- (Latvia) SK Cēsis (2014–2015 )
- (Germany) Saarlouis Royals (2015– )

== Achievements ==
- 2009 – 7th place in Eurobasket Women with Latvia women's national basketball team.
- 2009 – 3rd place in Latvian women basketball league with BK Liepājas Metalurgs.
