= Yang Banban =

Chinese basketball player

No. 8 – Beijing Great Wall
- Position: Point guard
- League: WCBA

Personal information
- Born: April 26, 1989 (age 37) Shenyang, Liaoning, China
- Listed height: 5 ft 7 in (1.70 m)

Career information
- Playing career: 2005–present

Career history
- 2005–06: Liaoning Golden Leopards
- 2006–08: Beijing Great Wall
- 2008–14: Liaoning Golden Leopards
- 2014–present: Beijing Great Wall

Yang Banban (Chinese: 杨半伴, born 26 April 1989) is a Chinese basketball player. She represented China at the 2010 FIBA World Championship for Women.

Yang Banban is the daughter of footballer Yang Yumin and basketball player/coach Wang Guizhi (currently the head coach of Xinjiang Magic Deer).
