= Diandra Tchatchouang =

French basketball player

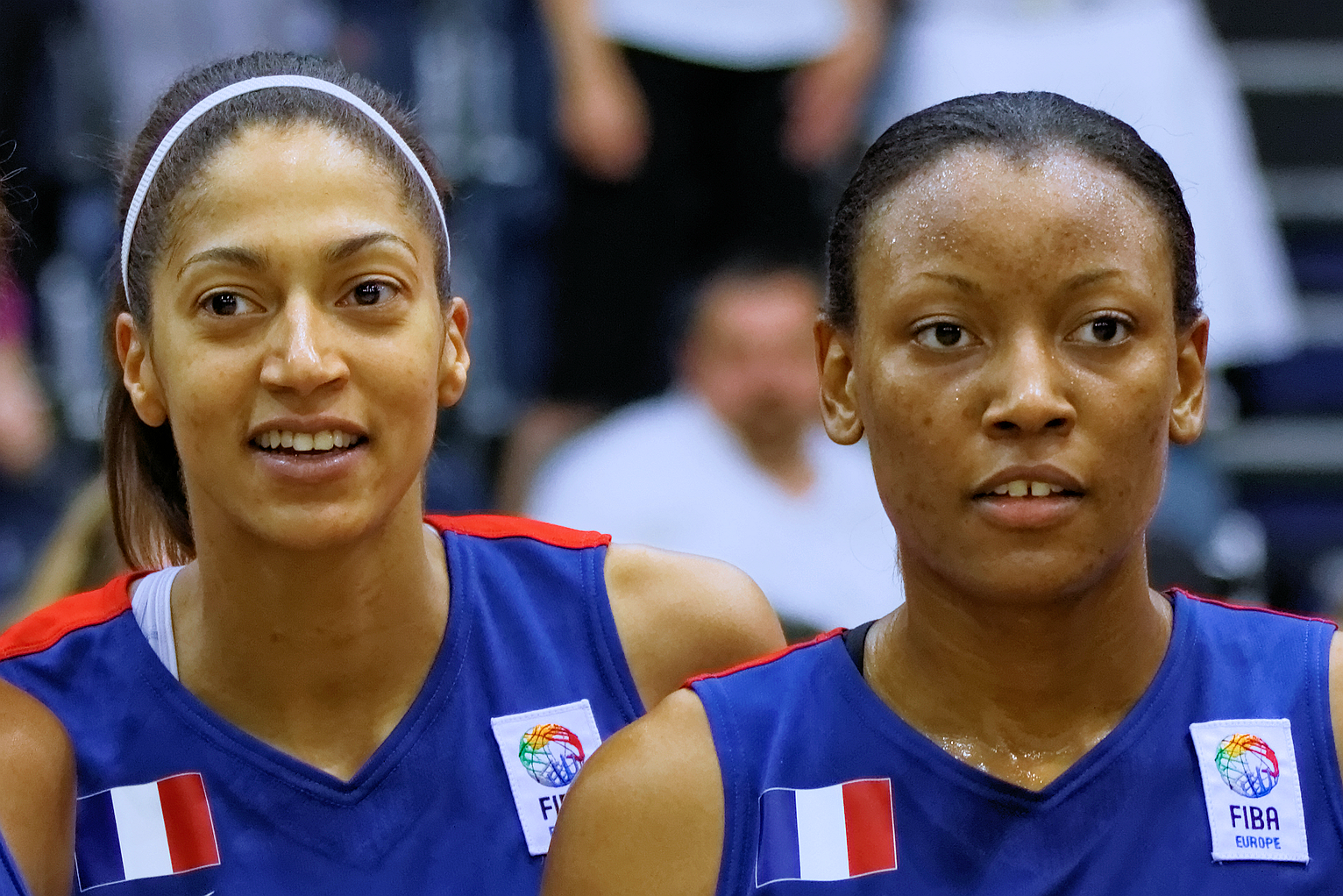
- Tchatchouang (right) with Emmeline Ndongue in 2013

No. 93 – CJM Bourges Basket
- Position: Small forward
- League: LFB

Personal information
- Born: 14 June 1991 (age 35) Villepinte, France
- Listed height: 6 ft 2 in (1.88 m)
- Listed weight: 165 lb (75 kg)

Career information
- College: Maryland (2009–2011)
- WNBA draft: 2013: 2nd round, 20th overall pick
- Drafted by: San Antonio Silver Stars
- Playing career: 2011–present

Career history
- 2011–2012: Lattes
- 2012–2013: Perpignan
- 2013–present: CJM Bourges Basket
- Stats at Basketball Reference

Diandra Tchatchouang (born 14 June 1991) is a French basketball player for CJM Bourges Basket. She has played the Euroleague with Basket Lattes, and in June 2012 she made her debut for the French national team. She is 1.87 meters tall and plays as a forward.
