= Maja Miljković =

Serbian basketball player

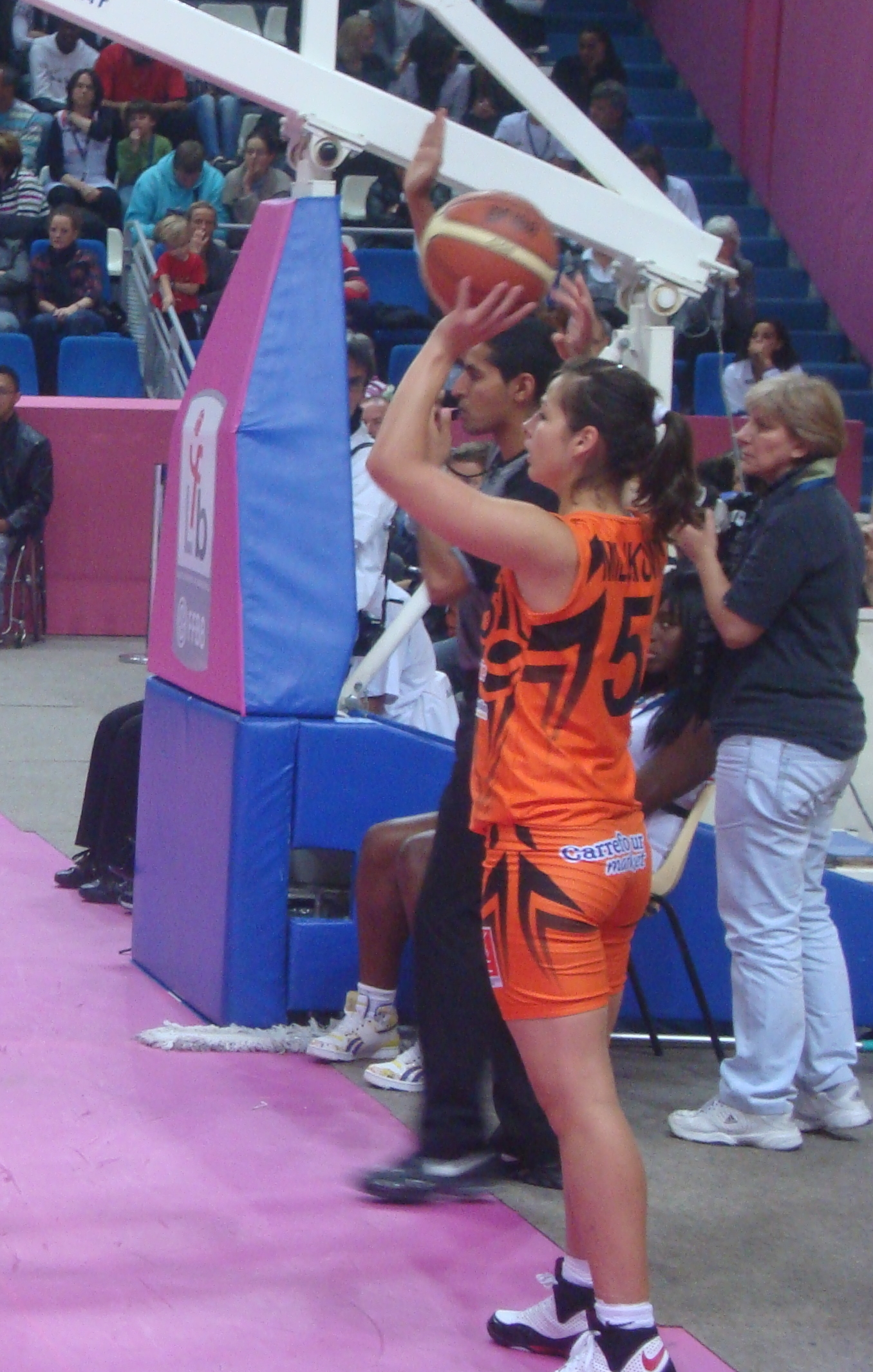
- Maja Miljković in 2010

No. 6 – CSM Satu Mare
- Position: Point guard
- League: Romanian National League

Personal information
- Born: 11 April 1988 (age 38) Leskovac, Yugoslavia
- Listed height: 1.75 m (5 ft 9 in)

Career information
- WNBA draft: 2010: undrafted
- Playing career: 2007–present

Career history
- 2007–2009: Real Club Celta Vigo
- 2009–2010: Sopron Basket
- 2010–2011: Tango Bourges Basket
- 2011: Partizan
- 2011–2012: Tarbes Gespe Bigorre
- 2012–2013: CSM Târgovişte
- 2014–2015: Yenisey Krasnoyarski
- 2015–2016: BC Namur-Capitale
- 2016–2019: Royal Castors Braine
- 2019-2020: CSM Satu Mare
Medals
Women's basketball
Representing Serbia
EuroBasket
Bronze medal – third place	2019 Latvia/Serbia
World U19 Championship
Silver medal – second place	2005 Tunisia
Bronze medal – third place	2007 Slovakia
European U20 Championship
Bronze medal – third place	2008 Italy
European U18 Championship
Gold medal – first place	2005 Hungary
Silver medal – second place	2006 Spain
European U16 Championship
Silver medal – second place	2004 Italy

Maja Miljković (Serbian: Маја Миљковић; born 11 April 1988) is a Serbian professional female basketball player. She plays as a point guard for CSM Satu Mare in the Liga Națională.
