= Elisabeth Pavel =

Romanian basketball player

Flying Foxes Post SV Wien
- Position: Center
- League: AWBL

Personal information
- Born: 1 September 1990 (age 36) Sibiu, Romania
- Listed height: 6 ft 4 in (1.93 m)

Career history
- 2003–2006: Magic Sibiu
- 2006–2008: BC ICIM Arad
- 2008–2010: CSM Satu Mare
- 2010–2012: Saces Dike Napoli
- 2012–present: Flying Foxes Post SV Wien (2012-2013&2013-2014)

Elisabeth Pavel (born 1 September 1990 in Sibiu) is a Romanian professional female basketball player. She plays as a center for the Austrian AWBL club Flying Foxes Post SV Wien. Pavel is a member of Romania women's national basketball team.

== Club career ==
In 2003-2004 she started her career for Magic Sibiu and then after four years moved to BC ICIM Arad in Divizia A. In EuroCup after 8 games Pavel averaged 7.6ppg, 5.4rpg, 1.4spg, FGP: 48.9%, FT: 68.2%.

After another season spent, she moved to CSM Satu Mare and then in 2010-2011 to Saces Dike Napoli in Italy. In 25 games her stats read 12.9ppg, 8.6rpg, 2.1spg, 2FGP: 51.4%, 3PT: 22.2%, FT: 57.3%. In 2011-2012, she improved to 15.2ppg, Reb-4 (9.7rpg), 1.9spg, FGP: 44.8%, 3PT: 35.4%, FT: 76.5%. Early in April she was number one amongst the players abroad. Elisabeth Pavel led Napoli to a victory over the fifth-ranked Firenze crushing them 81-59 in the A2 in Sunday night's game. Pavel was MVP of the game. She had a double-double by scoring 17 points and getting 15 rebounds. Pavel also added 4 blocks and 4 steals in 39 minutes on the court.

In the summer of 2012, she signed with the Austrian champions for a season. The Flying Foxes Wien have won the last six AWBL editions.

== International career ==
Pavel is a member of Romania women's national basketball team. In the EuroBasket Women 2013 qualification, she averaged 10.2ppg in the 8 campaign games.

In the away match versus Spain, Pavel was MVP of the game despite the 54-68 loss. She scored 22 points and got 7 rebounds in 34 minutes on the court.
