= Liene Priede =

Latvian basketball player

Retired
- Position: Shooting guard

Personal information
- Born: April 23, 1990 (age 36) Riga, Latvia
- Listed height: 5 ft 11 in (1.80 m)

Career history
- 2015–2018: TTT Riga

Liene Priede is a Latvian retired basketball player. She played for CC Lady Pirates and Latvia women's national basketball team. She represented national team in EuroBasket Women 2011.
