= Sthefany Thomas =

Argentine basketball player (born 1989)

Personal information
- Born: 4 May 1989 (age 37) Temuco, Chile
- Listed height: 5 ft 10 in (1.78 m)

Career information
- College: Clemson (2008–2011)
- Position: Forward

Career history
- Jaraguá
- Uruguay Unemi

Sthefany Thomas Díaz (born 4 May 1989) is a former basketball player who plays as a forward. Born in Chile, she has been a member of the Argentina women's national team at under–18 (2006), under–19 (2007) and senior (2008–2016) levels.

She is the daughter of James "Jimmy" Thomas (né Holliman), an American former basketball player, and an Argentine mother. She was born in Temuco, Chile, while her father was playing there. She was initially raised in Argentina and then in the United States. She attended the Clemson University.

Her brother Erik Thomas is also a basketball player.

== Clemson statistics ==
Legend
GP	Games played	GS	Games started	MPG	Minutes per game
FG%	Field goal percentage	3P%	3-point field goal percentage	FT%	Free throw percentage
RPG	Rebounds per game	APG	Assists per game	SPG	Steals per game
BPG	Blocks per game	PPG	Points per game	**Bold**	Career high

Year	Team	GP	Points	FG%	3P%	FT%	RPG	APG	SPG	BPG	PPG
2007-08	Clemson	**31**	248	35.2%	27.3%	79.6%	2.5	1.5	1.5	0.0	8.0
2008-09	Clemson	**31**	250	36.0%	27.3%	73.5%	2.6	1.0	0.7	0.2	8.1
2009-10	Clemson	28	235	**37.8%**	**34.1%**	**80.0%**	2.2	1.0	0.9	0.1	8.4
2010-11	Clemson	30	**355**	34.7%	32.7%	73.0%	**3.4**	**2.2**	**1.6**	**0.3**	**11.8**
Career		120	1088	35.7%	121.3%	205.3%	63.8	1.4	1.2	0.2	9.1
