= Krysten Boogaard =

Canadian basketball center

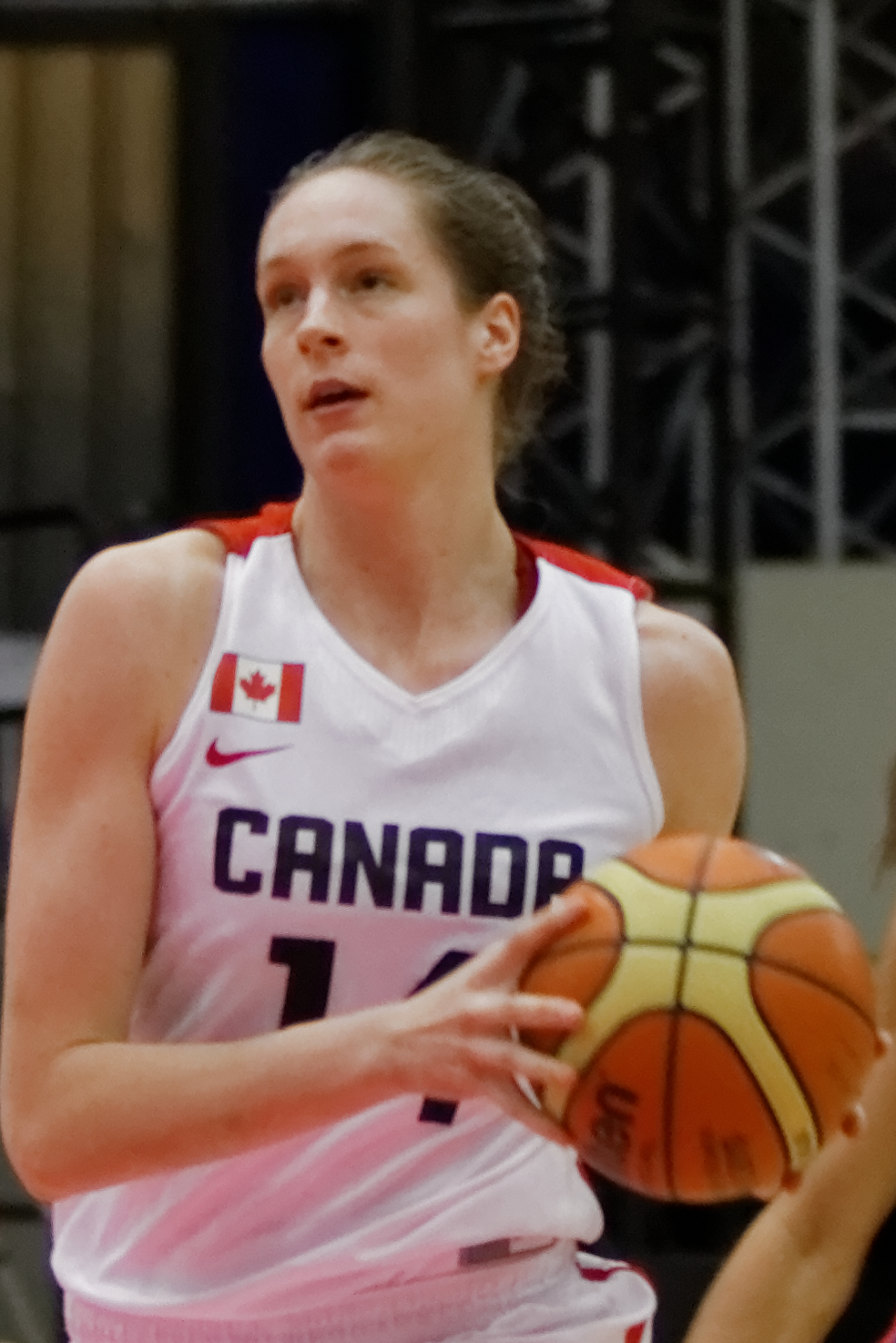

UNI Győr
- Position: Center
- League: Nemzeti Bajnokság

Personal information
- Born: February 18, 1988 (age 38) Regina, Saskatchewan, Canada
- Listed height: 6 ft 5 in (1.96 m)

Career information
- High school: Archbishop M.C. O'Neill HS
- College: Kansas
- Playing career: 2007–2011

Krysten Boogaard (born 18 February 1988) is a Canadian basketball center who played for the University of Kansas Jayhawks. Her older brother, the late Derek Boogaard, played in the NHL for the Minnesota Wild and New York Rangers, while her other brother, Aaron Boogaard, played in the Pittsburgh Penguins organization.

== Playing career ==
=== Kansas Jayhawks ===
==== 2008-09 ====
- Third on the team in scoring (9.0) and second in rebounding (5.5)
- Finished the season as the KU leader in field goal percentage at .530 (116-of-219)
- Finished the season with 31 blocks, which ranked second on the team and 11th in the Big 12 Conference
- Finished the season with three-straight double-figure performances, marking the first time in her KU career she went over 10 points in three-consecutive games
- Led KU on its west coast swing with 20 points and seven boards at UCLA (Dec. 21, 2008) and followed that up with a 22-point, nine-rebound effort at Pepperdine (Dec. 23, 2008)
- Had 18 points and 13 rebounds at Nebraska (Jan. 21, 2009), marking her first double-double of the season
- Also had a double-double in the Jayhawks' win over #5 Baylor (March 4, 2009) with 18 points and 11 rebounds

==== 2007-08 ====
- Third on the team in both scoring (9.4) and rebounding (5.6) on the season
- Led KU in blocks with 36 in her first season as a Jayhawk
- Led KU in scoring on six occasions and in rebounding 10 times
- Was the first KU player to score in a game on 10 occasions
- Named to the Big 12 All-Freshman Team by the Waco Tribune-Herald and the Dallas Morning News, as well as earning a spot on the Big 12 All-Rookie team as voted by the league coaches
- Surpassed the 20-point mark in scoring on four occasions, including a career-high 24 points versus San Jose State (Dec. 19, 2007)
- Pulled down a career-best 14 rebounds at Kansas State (Feb. 9, 2008) in the Sunflower Showdown

=== Team Canada ===
Boogaard was one of 12 Canadians chosen as part of the inaugural class at Canada Basketball's National Elite Development Academy in Hamilton, Ontario in 2006

- She averaged 14 points, 10 rebounds and four blocks at the National Elite Development Academy where she was coached by Christine Stapleton
- She led the Canadian Junior National Team to the silver medal last summer at the FIBA Americas Under-18 Championships in Colorado Springs, Colo

=== High school ===
- Named MVP, Best Defensive Player and Athlete of the Year during her career at Archbishop M.C. O'Neill High School prior to attending the National Elite Development Academy
- Was a Regina League All-Star participant and also earned letters in badminton, water polo and volleyball at Archbishop M.C. O'Neill.

== Kansas statistics ==
Legend
GP	Games played	GS	Games started	MPG	Minutes per game
FG%	Field goal percentage	3P%	3-point field goal percentage	FT%	Free throw percentage
RPG	Rebounds per game	APG	Assists per game	SPG	Steals per game
BPG	Blocks per game	PPG	Points per game	**Bold**	Career high

Year	Team	GP	Points	FG%	3P%	FT%	RPG	APG	SPG	BPG	PPG
2007-08	Kansas	33	**311**	50.4%	0.0%	55.3%	**5.6**	0.3	**0.6**	**1.1**	**9.4**
2008-09	Kansas	32	288	53.0%	0.0%	58.3%	5.5	0.3	0.4	1.0	9.0
2009-10	Kansas	33	287	**61.2%**	0.0%	67.5%	4.2	0.2	0.3	0.7	8.7
2010-11	Kansas	**34**	165	52.6%	0.0%	**70.5%**	2.5	**0.4**	0.3	0.5	4.9
Career		132	1051	54.0%	0.0%	61.8%	4.4	0.3	0.4	0.8	8.0

== Awards and honors ==
•2007-08 Big 12 All-Rookie Team •2007-08 Waco Tribune-Herald Big 12 All-Freshman Team •2007-08 Dallas Morning News Big 12 All-Freshman Team •2007-08 Most Improved

- Earned Phillips 66 Big 12 Rookie of the Week honors for the week of Jan. 28-Feb. 4, 2008 after averaging 15.5 points, 10.0 rebounds and 3.5 blocks in games versus Oklahoma and Iowa State
