= Ana Radović (basketball, born 1997) =

Bosnia and Herzegovina basketball player

Rudar Sport
- Position: Small forward
- League: Bosnian First League

Personal information
- Born: January 23, 1997 (age 29)
- Listed height: 1.80 m (5 ft 11 in)

Career history
- 2014–2015: Brčanka
- 2015–2016: Rudar Sport

Ana Radović (born 23 January 1997) is a Bosnian female basketball player.
