= Marina Solopova =

Lithuanian basketball player (born 1990)

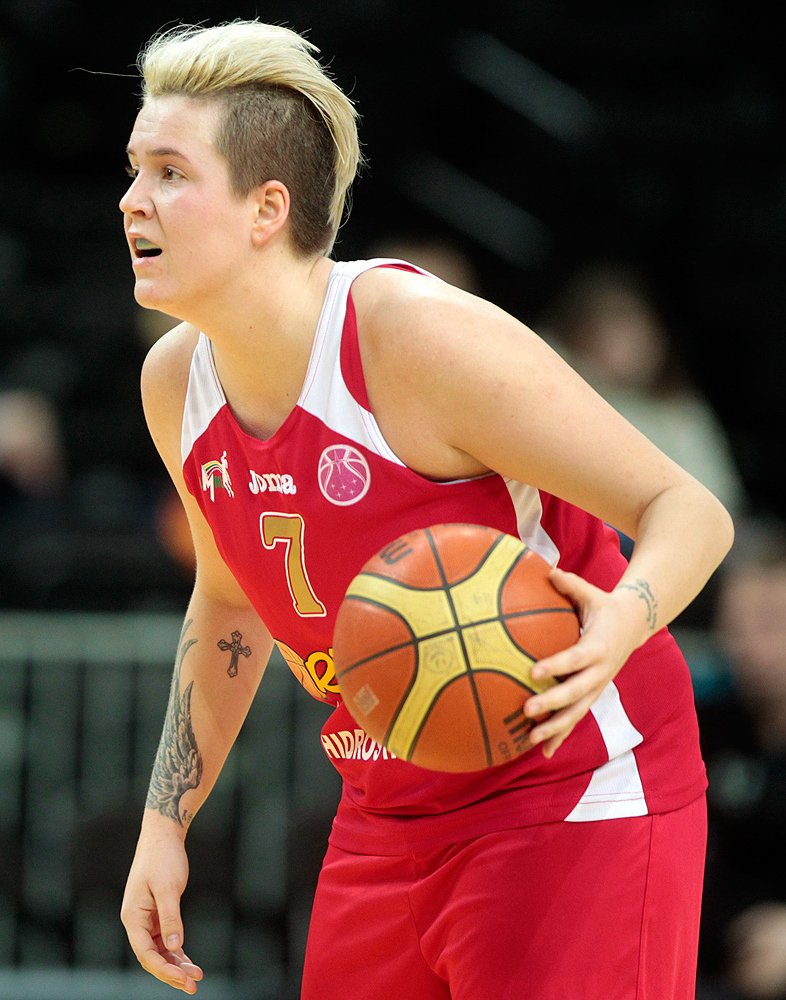

No. 13 – KP Brno
- Position: Shooting guard

Personal information
- Born: 13 February 1990 (age 36) Klaipėda, Lithuania
- Listed height: 1.83 m (6 ft 0 in)

Career information
- Playing career: 2006–present
- Number: 0,5,7,13,23,31

Career history
- 2006-2010: Lemminkainen
- 2010: VIČI-Aistės Kaunas
- 2011: Good Angels Košice
- 2011-2012: Saint-Amand Hainaut Basket
- 2012-2013: Edremit Belediyesi
- 2013: Izmir Konak
- 2013-2014: Kibirkstis Vilnius
- 2014-2015: Klaipėdos Fortūna
- 2015-2016: Utenos Utena
- 2016-2017: BK Brno
- 2017-2018: CSM Satu Mare (basketball)
- 2018 - 2019: ACS Sepsi SIC
- 2019-2020: Saint-Amand Hainaut Basket
- 2020-2021: CSM Satu Mare (basketball)
- 2021 - present: İzmit Belediyespor

Marina Solopova (born 13 February 1990) is a Lithuanian female professional basketball player.
