= Ana Radović (basketball, born 1990) =

Serbian basketball player

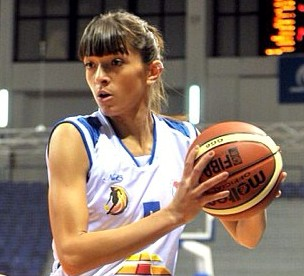
- Ana Radović in ŽKK Budućnost Podgorica in 2014

No. 5 – COB Calais
- Position: Center
- League: Ligue féminine 2

Personal information
- Born: July 15, 1990 (age 36) Užice, SFR Yugoslavia
- Listed height: 1.90 m (6 ft 3 in)

Career information
- WNBA draft: 2012: undrafted

Career history
- Vojvodina
- 2008–2009: Crvena zvezda
- 2009–2013: Voždovac
- 2013: Utena
- 2013: Fortuna
- 2013–2014: Budućnost Podgorica
- 2014–2015: Dynamo Novosibirsk
- 2015: Royal Castors Braine
- 2015-2016: Reims Basket
- 2016–2017: COB Calais
- 2017–2018: Olimpia Brasov
- 2018–2019: Cinkarna Celje
- 2019-present: Olivais Coimbra
Medals
Women's basketball
Representing Serbia
Mediterranean Games
Silver medal – second place	2009 Pescara	Team

Ana Radović (Serbian: Ана Радовић; born 15 July 1990 in Užice, SFR Yugoslavia) is a Serbian female basketball player.
