= 2021 FIBA U16 Women's European Challengers =

Tournament details
- Dates: 9–16 August 2021
- Teams: 29
- Venue(s): 5 (in 5 host cities)

Official website
- www.fiba.basketball

The 2021 FIBA U16 Women's European Challengers were international basketball competitions which took place from 9 to 16 August 2021, replacing the cancelled 2021 FIBA U16 Women's European Championship. Top two teams from groups A, B and C qualified for the 2022 FIBA Under-17 Women's Basketball World Cup.

== History ==
The 2020 edition of FIBA U16 Women's European Championship was to be held in Matosinhos, Portugal but was postponed to 2021 due to COVID-19 pandemic. Since the pandemic continued in 2021, the FIBA Europe decided to hold alternative format of competition to replace traditional format of U16 Women's European Championship where 16 or more teams gather in one place.

== Structure ==
- The events are to be played on a voluntary participation basis, with promotion/relegation to be frozen across Divisions A, B and C.
- The Top 18 ranked teams (16 currently in Division A, plus two additional teams by 2019 ranking in respective category) to play three tournaments of six teams each (Groups A, B and C).
- All other registered teams, ranked 19 and lower, to play in tournaments of up to six teams each (Group D).
- One tournament of up to six teams to be created with the lowest-ranked teams to accommodate Division C and Small Countries. (Group E).
- All tournaments to be played in Round Robin format, with groups to be created by "serpentine" style allocation, taking the hosting situation into consideration.

== Participating teams ==
Top-18 Challengers

- Belgium
- Bulgaria
- Croatia
- Czech Republic
- Finland
- France
- Germany
- Greece
- Hungary
- Latvia
- Lithuania
- Poland
- Portugal
- Russia
- Serbia
- Slovenia
- Spain
- Ukraine

19–24 Challenger

- Ireland
- Israel
- Luxembourg
- Romania
- Slovakia
- Switzerland

25–29 Challenger

- Albania
- Armenia
- Georgia
- Malta
- North Macedonia

== Top-18 Challengers ==
=== Group A ===
The Group A tournament was played in Helsinki, Finland.

Pos	Team	Pld	W	L	PF	PA	PD	Pts	Qualification
1	France	5	5	0	399	277	+122	10	2022 FIBA Under-17 Women's Basketball World Cup
2	Germany	5	2	3	302	298	+4	7	2022 FIBA Under-17 Women's Basketball World Cup
3	Finland	5	2	3	325	343	−18	7	
4	Bulgaria	5	2	3	278	325	−47	7	
5	Latvia	5	2	3	304	313	−9	7	
6	Greece	5	2	3	255	307	−52	7	

Source: FIBA

9 August 2021

Boxscore

Germany	65–47	Greece

9 August 2021

Boxscore

Bulgaria	45–87	France

9 August 2021

Boxscore

Finland	76–75	Latvia

10 August 2021

Boxscore

Greece	56–51	Bulgaria

10 August 2021

Boxscore

Latvia	57–56	Germany

10 August 2021

Boxscore

France	86–72	Finland

11 August 2021

Boxscore

Bulgaria	63–51	Latvia

11 August 2021

Boxscore

Greece	43–82	France

11 August 2021

Boxscore

Germany	60–62	Finland

13 August 2021

Boxscore

France	77–51	Germany

13 August 2021

Boxscore

Latvia	55–51	Greece

13 August 2021

Boxscore

Finland	61–64	Bulgaria

14 August 2021

Boxscore

Latvia	66–67	France

14 August 2021

Boxscore

Bulgaria	55–70	Germany

14 August 2021

Boxscore

Greece	58–54	Finland

== Group B ==
The Group B tournament was played in San Fernando, Spain. Hungary qualified for the 2022 FIBA Under-17 Women's Basketball World Cup as hosts.

Pos	Team	Pld	W	L	PF	PA	PD	Pts	Qualification
1	Spain	5	5	0	386	196	+190	10	2022 FIBA Under-17 Women's Basketball World Cup
2	Serbia	5	4	1	304	267	+37	9	
3	Hungary	5	3	2	345	271	+74	8	2022 FIBA Under-17 Women's Basketball World Cup
4	Croatia	5	2	3	302	354	−52	7	
5	Ukraine	5	1	4	267	370	−103	6	
6	Lithuania	5	0	5	240	386	−146	5	

Source: FIBA

9 August 2021

Boxscore

Lithuania	73–77	Croatia

9 August 2021

Boxscore

Serbia	58–55	Hungary

9 August 2021

Boxscore

Ukraine	49–98	Spain

10 August 2021

Boxscore

Hungary	82–48	Lithuania

10 August 2021

Boxscore

Croatia	78–54	Ukraine

10 August 2021

Boxscore

Spain	58–40	Serbia

11 August 2021

Boxscore

Ukraine	62–90	Hungary

11 August 2021

Boxscore

Lithuania	44–68	Serbia

11 August 2021

Boxscore

Croatia	38–69	Spain

13 August 2021

Boxscore

Serbia	59–51	Ukraine

13 August 2021

Boxscore

Hungary	79–50	Croatia

13 August 2021

Boxscore

Spain	108–30	Lithuania

14 August 2021

Boxscore

Croatia	59–79	Serbia

14 August 2021

Boxscore

Ukraine	51–45	Lithuania

14 August 2021

Boxscore

Hungary	39–53	Spain

== Group C ==
The Group C tournament was played in Matosinhos, Portugal. Russia originally qualified for the 2022 FIBA Under-17 Women's Basketball World Cup, but were excluded due to their country's invasion of Ukraine and were replaced by Belgium.

Pos	Team	Pld	W	L	PF	PA	PD	Pts	Qualification
1	Slovenia	5	5	0	351	274	+77	10	2022 FIBA Under-17 Women's Basketball World Cup
2	Russia	5	4	1	335	286	+49	9	
3	Belgium	5	3	2	289	266	+23	8	2022 FIBA Under-17 Women's Basketball World Cup
4	Portugal	5	1	4	251	297	−46	6	
5	Poland	5	1	4	283	315	−32	6	
6	Czech Republic	5	1	4	307	378	−71	6	

Source: FIBA

9 August 2021

Boxscore

Poland	63–71	Belgium

9 August 2021

Boxscore

Slovenia	66–60	Russia

9 August 2021

Boxscore

Portugal	71–54	Czech Republic

10 August 2021

Boxscore

Belgium	47–62	Slovenia

10 August 2021

Boxscore

Czech Republic	61–58	Poland

10 August 2021

Boxscore

Russia	66–43	Portugal

11 August 2021

Boxscore

Slovenia	84–67	Czech Republic

11 August 2021

Boxscore

Belgium	47–55	Russia

11 August 2021

Boxscore

Poland	57–51	Portugal

13 August 2021

Boxscore

Russia	65–58	Poland

13 August 2021

Boxscore

Czech Republic	53–76	Belgium

13 August 2021

Boxscore

Portugal	53–72	Slovenia

14 August 2021

Boxscore

Czech Republic	72–89	Russia

14 August 2021

Boxscore

Slovenia	67–47	Poland

14 August 2021

Boxscore

Belgium	48–33	Portugal

== 19–24 Challenger ==
=== Group D ===
The Group D tournament was played in Piešťany, Slovakia.

Pos	Team	Pld	W	L	PF	PA	PD	Pts
19	Slovakia	5	5	0	335	258	+77	10
20	Israel	5	3	2	323	229	+94	8
21	Romania	5	3	2	295	238	+57	8
22	Switzerland	5	3	2	300	275	+25	8
23	Luxembourg	5	1	4	240	295	−55	6
24	Ireland	5	0	5	198	396	−198	5

Source: FIBA

11 August 2021

Boxscore

Switzerland	37–68	Israel

11 August 2021

Boxscore

Luxembourg	40–66	Romania

11 August 2021

Boxscore

Ireland	40–94	Slovakia

12 August 2021

Boxscore

Romania	54–63	Switzerland

12 August 2021

Boxscore

Israel	102–39	Ireland

12 August 2021

Boxscore

Slovakia	57–54	Luxembourg

13 August 2021

Boxscore

Ireland	36–74	Switzerland

13 August 2021

Boxscore

Luxembourg	40–66	Israel

13 August 2021

Boxscore

Slovakia	55–54	Romania

15 August 2021

Boxscore

Switzerland	60–49	Luxembourg

15 August 2021

Boxscore

Romania	69–37	Ireland

15 August 2021

Boxscore

Israel	44–61	Slovakia

16 August 2021

Boxscore

Luxembourg	57–46	Ireland

16 August 2021

Boxscore

Israel	43–52	Romania

16 August 2021

Boxscore

Slovakia	68–66	Switzerland

== 25–29 Challenger ==
=== Group E ===
The Group E tournament was played in Tbilisi, Georgia.

Pos	Team	Pld	W	L	PF	PA	PD	Pts
25	North Macedonia	4	4	0	359	157	+202	8
26	Albania	4	3	1	224	197	+27	7
27	Armenia	4	2	2	170	261	−91	6
28	Malta	4	1	3	225	223	+2	5
29	Georgia	4	0	4	159	299	−140	4

Source: FIBA

9 August 2021

Boxscore

Albania	61–37	Armenia

9 August 2021

Boxscore

Malta	71–28	Georgia

10 August 2021

Boxscore

North Macedonia	91–53	Malta

10 August 2021

Boxscore

Georgia	37–64	Albania

11 August 2021

Boxscore

Albania	46–72	North Macedonia

11 August 2021

Boxscore

Armenia	60–58	Georgia

13 August 2021

Boxscore

Malta	51–53	Albania

13 August 2021

Boxscore

North Macedonia	92–22	Armenia

14 August 2021

Boxscore

Armenia	51–50	Malta

14 August 2021

Boxscore

Georgia	36–104	North Macedonia

== See also ==
- 2021 FIBA U20 European Challengers
- 2021 FIBA U18 European Challengers
- 2021 FIBA U16 European Challengers
- 2021 FIBA U20 Women's European Challengers
- 2021 FIBA U18 Women's European Challengers
