= Yugoslavia women's national under-16 basketball team =

Yugoslavia
- FIBA zone: FIBA Europe
- National federation: Basketball Federation of Yugoslavia

U16 EuroBasket
- Appearances: 9
- Medals: Silver: 2 (1982, 1991); Bronze: 2 (1985, 1987)
Home	Away

The Yugoslavia women's national under-16 basketball team (Serbo-Croatian: Kadetska košarkaška reprezentacija Jugoslavije) was the girls' basketball team, administered by Basketball Federation of Yugoslavia, that represented SFR Yugoslavia in international under-16 women's basketball competitions, consisted mainly of the European Championship for Cadettes, nowadays known as the FIBA U16 Women's EuroBasket.

After the dissolution of SFR Yugoslavia in 1991, the successor countries all set up their own national under-16 teams.

== FIBA U16 Women's EuroBasket record ==
Year	Pos.	GP	W	L	Ref.
(Poland) 1976	7th	6	5	1	
(Spain) 1978	6th	8	5	3	
(Hungary) 1980	7th	8	5	3	
(Finland) 1982	2nd place, silver medalist(s)	7	6	1	
(Italy) 1984	7th	7	4	3	
(Socialist Federal Republic of Yugoslavia) 1985	3rd place, bronze medalist(s)	7	6	1	
(Poland) 1987	3rd place, bronze medalist(s)	7	4	3	
(Romania) 1989	7th	7	4	3	
(Portugal) 1991	2nd place, silver medalist(s)	7	6	1	
Total	9/9	64	45	19	

== Individual awards ==
Top Scorer

- Zagorka Počeković – 1982
- Danira Nakić – 1985
- Žana Lelas – 1987
- Vedrana Grgin – 1991

== Coaches ==
Years	Head coach	Assistant coach(es)
1976	Bogo Debevc	
1978	Borislav Ćorković	
1980	Branko Milačić	
1982	Milan Vasojević	
1984	Mihajlo Vuković	
1985	Milan Vasojević	
1987	Miodrag Vesković	Zoran Kovačić
1989	Milan Vasojević	
1991	Sulejman Begovac	

== New national teams ==
After the dissolution of SFR Yugoslavia in 1991, five new countries were created: Bosnia and Herzegovina, Croatia, FYR Macedonia, FR Yugoslavia (in 2003, renamed to Serbia and Montenegro) and Slovenia. In 2006, Montenegro became an independent nation and Serbia became the legal successor of Serbia and Montenegro. In 2008, Kosovo declared independence from Serbia and became a FIBA member in 2015.

Here is a list of women's national under-16 teams on the SFR Yugoslavia area:

- Bosnia and Herzegovina (1992–present)
- Croatia (1992–present)
- North Macedonia (1993–present)
- Serbia and Montenegro (1992–2006)
  - Montenegro (2006–present)
  - Serbia (2006–present)
    - Kosovo (2015–present)
- Slovenia (1992–present)

== See also ==
- Yugoslavia women's national under-19 basketball team
- Yugoslavia women's national under-18 basketball team
