= 1982 FIBA European Championship for Cadettes =

4th FIBA Under-16 Women's European Basketball Championship

Tournament details
- Host country: Finland
- Dates: 8–15 August 1982
- Teams: 12
- Venue: (in 2 host cities)

Final positions
- Champions: Soviet Union (4th title)

Tournament statistics
- Top scorer: (Socialist Federal Republic of Yugoslavia) Počeković (25.7)
- PPG (Team): Soviet Union (80.1)

The 1982 FIBA European Championship for Cadettes was the fourth edition of the European basketball championship for U16 women's teams, today known as FIBA U16 Women's European Championship. 12 teams featured in the competition, held in Forssa and Uusikaupunki, Finland, from 8 to 15 August 1982.

The Soviet Union won their fourth title in a row.

== Participating teams ==
- Bulgaria
- Finland
- France
- West Germany
- Hungary
- Israel
- Italy
- Netherlands
- Soviet Union
- Spain
- Sweden
- Yugoslavia

== Preliminary round ==
In the preliminary round, the twelve teams were allocated in two groups of six teams each. The top two teams of each group advanced to the semifinals. The third and fourth place of each group qualified for the 5th-8th playoffs. The last two teams of each group qualified for the 9th-12th playoffs.

Team advanced to the Semifinals
Team competed in the 5th-8th playoff
Team competed in the 9th-12th playoff

=== Group A ===
Team	Pld	W	L	PF	PA	PD	Pts	Tie
Bulgaria	5	5	0	364	268	+96	10	
Italy	5	4	1	355	253	+102	9	
France	5	2	3	227	260	−33	7	1–0
Finland	5	2	3	303	306	−3	7	0–1
Netherlands	5	1	4	238	365	−127	6	1–0
Sweden	5	1	4	294	329	−35	6	0–1

	(Bulgaria)	(Italy)	(France)	(Finland)	(Netherlands)	(Sweden)
Bulgaria	—	62–59	71–44	77–61	81–45	73–59
Italy	—	—	58–34	80–56	88–41	70–60
France	—	—	—	47–46	58–40	44–45
Finland	—	—	—	—	69–41	71–61
Netherlands	—	—	—	—	—	71–69
Sweden	—	—	—	—	—	—

=== Group B ===
Team	Pld	W	L	PF	PA	PD	Pts	Tie
Yugoslavia	5	5	0	363	246	+117	10	
Soviet Union	5	4	1	411	260	+151	9	
Spain	5	2	3	245	307	−62	7	1–0
Hungary	5	2	3	294	328	−34	7	0–1
West Germany	5	1	4	289	345	−56	6	1–0
Israel	5	1	4	224	340	−116	6	0–1

	(Socialist Federal Republic of Yugoslavia)	(Soviet Union)	(Spain)	(Hungary)	(West Germany)	(Israel)
Yugoslavia	—	75–71	70–42	70–46	66–51	82–36
Soviet Union	—	—	88–43	87–51	91–48	74–43
Spain	—	—	—	68–56	53–50	39–43
Hungary	—	—	—	—	75–61	66–42
West Germany	—	—	—	—	—	79–60
Israel	—	—	—	—	—	—

== Playoffs ==
=== 9th-12th playoff ===
Semifinals
August 14
West Germany	59
Sweden	43
August 14
Netherlands	63
Israel	52

9th place game
August 15
West Germany	63
Netherlands	53
11th place game
August 15
Sweden	74
Israel	35

=== 5th-8th playoff ===
Semifinals
August 14
France	41
Hungary	60
August 14
Spain	63
Finland	64

5th place game
August 15
Hungary	69
Finland	71
7th place game
August 15
France	57
Spain	55

=== Championship playoff ===
Semifinals
August 14
Bulgaria	75
Soviet Union	84
August 14
Yugoslavia	65
Italy	57

Final
August 15
Soviet Union	66
Yugoslavia	65
Bronze game
August 15
Italy	70
Bulgaria	68

== Final standings ==
Rank	Team
1st place, gold medalist(s)	Soviet Union
2nd place, silver medalist(s)	Yugoslavia
3rd place, bronze medalist(s)	Italy
4th	Bulgaria
5th	Finland
6th	Hungary
7th	France
8th	Spain
9th	West Germany
10th	Netherlands
11th	Sweden
12th	Israel

1982 FIBA Europe Women's Under-16 Championship winners

Soviet Union
4th title
