= 2022 FIBA U16 Women's European Championship =

Tournament details
- Host country: Portugal
- City: Matosinhos
- Dates: 19–27 August 2022
- Teams: 16 (from 1 confederation)
- Venues: 2 (in 1 host city)

Final positions
- Champions: France (4th title)
- Runners-up: Spain
- Third place: Croatia

Tournament statistics
- MVP: (Spain) Iyana Martín

Official website
- www.fiba.basketball

The 2022 FIBA U16 Women's European Championship was the 32nd edition of the Women's European basketball championship for national under-16 teams. It was played from 19 to 27 August 2022 in Matosinhos, Portugal.

== Venues ==
Matosinhos		2022 FIBA U16 Women's European Championship is located in Portugal
Centro de Desportos e Congressos de Matosinhos	Pavilhão Municipal de Guifões	2022 FIBA U16 Women's European Championship is located in Portugal
Capacity: 3,875	Capacity: 308	2022 FIBA U16 Women's European Championship is located in Portugal

== Participating teams ==
After the 2022 Russian invasion of Ukraine, Russia were expelled from the competition. They were replaced by Poland, 14th in the 2019 Division A edition.

- Belgium
- Croatia ▲ (Third place, 2019 FIBA U16 Women's European Championship Division B)
- Czech Republic
- Denmark
- Finland
- France
- Germany
- Greece
- Hungary
- Italy
- Latvia
- Lithuania
- Poland
- Portugal ▲ (Runners-up, 2019 FIBA U16 Women's European Championship Division B)
- ~~Russia~~
- Slovenia ▲ (Winners, 2019 FIBA U16 Women's European Championship Division B)
- Spain

== First round ==
The draw of the first round was held on 15 February 2022 in Freising, Germany.

In the first round, the teams were drawn into four groups of four. All teams advance to the playoffs.

=== Group A ===
Pos	Team	Pld	W	L	PF	PA	PD	Pts
1	Hungary	3	3	0	181	140	+41	6
2	Croatia	3	2	1	174	163	+11	5
3	Italy	3	1	2	158	170	−12	4
4	Finland	3	0	3	137	177	−40	3

Source: FIBA

19 August 2022

Boxscore

Finland	50–56	Italy

19 August 2022

Boxscore

Hungary	61–53	Croatia

20 August 2022

Boxscore

Croatia	57–50	Finland

20 August 2022

Boxscore

Italy	50–56	Hungary

21 August 2022

Boxscore

Croatia	64–52	Italy

21 August 2022

Boxscore

Finland	37–64	Hungary

=== Group B ===
Pos	Team	Pld	W	L	PF	PA	PD	Pts
1	Spain	3	3	0	224	114	+110	6
2	Lithuania	3	2	1	182	179	+3	5
3	Slovenia	3	1	2	151	213	−62	4
4	Germany	3	0	3	134	185	−51	3

Source: FIBA

19 August 2022

Boxscore

Slovenia	33–87	Spain

19 August 2022

Boxscore

Germany	54–55	Lithuania

20 August 2022

Boxscore

Lithuania	78–54	Slovenia

20 August 2022

Boxscore

Spain	66–32	Germany

21 August 2022

Boxscore

Lithuania	49–71	Spain

21 August 2022

Boxscore

Slovenia	64–48	Germany

=== Group C ===
Pos	Team	Pld	W	L	PF	PA	PD	Pts
1	Belgium	3	3	0	184	166	+18	6
2	Portugal	3	2	1	186	164	+22	5
3	Latvia	3	1	2	198	201	−3	4
4	Poland	3	0	3	160	197	−37	3

Source: FIBA

19 August 2022

Boxscore

Portugal	56–53	Poland

19 August 2022

Boxscore

Latvia	63–67	Belgium

20 August 2022

Boxscore

Belgium	53–51	Portugal

20 August 2022

Boxscore

Poland	55–77	Latvia

21 August 2022

Boxscore

Belgium	64–52	Poland

21 August 2022

Boxscore

Portugal	79–58	Latvia

=== Group D ===
Pos	Team	Pld	W	L	PF	PA	PD	Pts
1	France	3	3	0	257	123	+134	6
2	Greece	3	2	1	185	173	+12	5
3	Czech Republic	3	1	2	167	198	−31	4
4	Denmark	3	0	3	136	251	−115	3

Source: FIBA

19 August 2022

Boxscore

Greece	40–72	France

19 August 2022

Boxscore

Czech Republic	81–38	Denmark

20 August 2022

Boxscore

Denmark	50–67	Greece

20 August 2022

Boxscore

France	82–35	Czech Republic

21 August 2022

Boxscore

Denmark	48–103	France

21 August 2022

Boxscore

Greece	78–51	Czech Republic

== Playoff brackets ==
=== Main bracket ===
Round of 16
23 August
A1 Hungary	53
B4 Germany	47
23 August
C2 Portugal	80
D3 Czech Republic	61
23 August
B2 Lithuania	44
A3 Italy	51
23 August
D1 France	82
C4 Poland	39
23 August
A2 Croatia	68
B3 Slovenia	66
23 August
C1 Belgium	112
D4 Denmark	46
23 August
B1 Spain	90
A4 Finland	49
23 August
D2 Greece	77
C3 Latvia	64

Quarterfinals
24 August
Hungary	53
Portugal	56
24 August
Italy	48
France	78
24 August
Croatia	60
Belgium	58
24 August
Spain	74
Greece	50

Semifinals
26 August
Portugal	36
France	87
26 August
Croatia	54
Spain	75

Final
27 August
France	65
Spain	61
3rd place match
27 August
Portugal	58
Croatia	72

=== 5th place bracket ===
5th–8th place semifinals
26 August
Hungary	56
Italy	54
26 August
Belgium	57
Greece	61

5th place match
27 August
Hungary	58
Greece	44
7th place match
27 August
Italy	46
Belgium	61

=== 9th place bracket ===
9th–16th place quarterfinals
24 August
Germany	56
Czech Republic	60
24 August
Lithuania	68
Poland	69
24 August
Slovenia	78
Denmark	47
24 August
Finland	61
Latvia	64

9th–12th place semifinals
26 August
Czech Republic	55
Poland	74
26 August
Slovenia	70
Latvia	80

9th place match
27 August
Poland	51
Latvia	76
11th place match
27 August
Czech Republic	66
Slovenia	74

=== 13th place bracket ===
13th–16th place semifinals
26 August
Germany	73
Lithuania	68
26 August
Denmark	47
Finland	64

13th place match
27 August
Germany	40
Finland	51
15th place match
27 August
Lithuania	64
Denmark	49

== Playoff results ==
=== Round of 16 ===
23 August 2022
14:00

Boxscore

Lithuania	44–51	Italy

Centro de Desportos e Congressos de Matosinhos

23 August 2022
14:00

Boxscore

Greece	77–64	Latvia

Pavilhão Municipal de Guifões

23 August 2022
16:15

Boxscore

Spain	90–49	Finland

Pavilhão Municipal de Guifões

23 August 2022
16:15

Boxscore

France	82–39	Poland

Centro de Desportos e Congressos de Matosinhos

23 August 2022
18:30

Boxscore

Hungary	53–47	Germany

Centro de Desportos e Congressos de Matosinhos

23 August 2022
18:30

Boxscore

Croatia	68–66	Slovenia

Pavilhão Municipal de Guifões

23 August 2022
20:45

Boxscore

Belgium	112–46	Denmark

Pavilhão Municipal de Guifões

23 August 2022
20:45

Boxscore

Portugal	80–61	Czech Republic

Centro de Desportos e Congressos de Matosinhos

=== 9th–16th place quarterfinals ===
24 August 2022
14:00

Boxscore

Finland	61–64	Latvia

Pavilhão Municipal de Guifões

24 August 2022
16:15

Boxscore

Lithuania	68–69	Poland

Pavilhão Municipal de Guifões

24 August 2022
18:30

Boxscore

Slovenia	78–47	Denmark

Pavilhão Municipal de Guifões

24 August 2022
20:45

Boxscore

Germany	56–60	Czech Republic

Pavilhão Municipal de Guifões

=== 13th–16th place semifinals ===
26 August 2022
14:00

Boxscore

Germany	73–68	Lithuania

Pavilhão Municipal de Guifões

26 August 2022
16:15

Boxscore

Denmark	47–64	Finland

Pavilhão Municipal de Guifões

=== 15th place match ===
27 August 2022
11:00

Boxscore

Lithuania	64–49	Denmark

Pavilhão Municipal de Guifões

=== 13th place match ===
27 August 2022
15:15

Boxscore

Germany	40–51	Finland

Centro de Desportos e Congressos de Matosinhos

=== 9th–12th place semifinals ===
26 August 2022
18:30

Boxscore

Czech Republic	55–74	Poland

Pavilhão Municipal de Guifões

26 August 2022
20:45

Boxscore

Slovenia	70–80	Latvia

Pavilhão Municipal de Guifões

=== 11th place match ===
27 August 2022
13:15

Boxscore

Czech Republic	66–74	Slovenia

Pavilhão Municipal de Guifões

=== 9th place match ===
27 August 2022
15:30

Boxscore

Poland	51–76	Latvia

Pavilhão Municipal de Guifões

=== Championship quarterfinals ===
24 August 2022
14:00

Boxscore

Spain	74–50	Greece

Centro de Desportos e Congressos de Matosinhos

24 August 2022
16:15

Boxscore

Italy	48–78	France

Centro de Desportos e Congressos de Matosinhos

24 August 2022
18:30

Boxscore

Croatia	60–58	Belgium

Centro de Desportos e Congressos de Matosinhos

24 August 2022
20:45

Boxscore

Hungary	53–56	Portugal

Centro de Desportos e Congressos de Matosinhos

=== 5th–8th place semifinals ===
26 August 2022
14:00

Boxscore

Hungary	56–54	Italy

Centro de Desportos e Congressos de Matosinhos

26 August 2022
16:15

Boxscore

Belgium	57–61	Greece

Centro de Desportos e Congressos de Matosinhos

=== 7th place match ===
27 August 2022
13:00

Boxscore

Italy	46–61	Belgium

Centro de Desportos e Congressos de Matosinhos

=== 5th place match ===
27 August 2022
17:45

Boxscore

Hungary	58–44	Greece

Pavilhão Municipal de Guifões

=== Championship semifinals ===
26 August 2022
18:30

Boxscore

Croatia	54–75	Spain

Centro de Desportos e Congressos de Matosinhos

26 August 2022
20:45

Boxscore

Portugal	36–87	France

Centro de Desportos e Congressos de Matosinhos

=== 3rd place match ===
27 August 2022
17:30

Boxscore

Portugal	58–72	Croatia

Centro de Desportos e Congressos de Matosinhos

=== Final ===
27 August 2022
19:45

Boxscore

France	65–61	Spain

Centro de Desportos e Congressos de Matosinhos

== Final standings ==
Rank	Team	Record
1st place, gold medalist(s)	France	7–0
2nd place, silver medalist(s)	Spain	6–1
3rd place, bronze medalist(s)	Croatia	5–2
4	Portugal	4–3
5	Hungary	6–1
6	Greece	4–3
7	Belgium	5–2
8	Italy	2–5
9	Latvia	4–3
10	Poland	2–5
11	Slovenia	3–4
12	Czech Republic	2–5
13	Finland	2–5
14	Germany	1–6
15	Lithuania	3–4
16	Denmark	0–7

Relegated to the 2023 FIBA U16 Women's European Championship Division B

== Awards ==
Most Valuable Player
(Spain) Iyana Martín Carrión

All-Tournament Team

- (Spain) Iyana Martín Carrión
- (Spain) Awa Fam
- (Croatia) Petra Bozan
- (Croatia) Lena Bilic
- (France) Tea Cleante
