= 1987 FIBA European Championship for Cadettes =

7th FIBA Under-16 Women's European Basketball Championship

Tournament details
- Host country: Poland
- Dates: 26 July – 2 August 1987
- Teams: 12
- Venue: (in 1 host city)

Final positions
- Champions: Soviet Union (7th title)

Tournament statistics
- Top scorer: (Socialist Federal Republic of Yugoslavia) Lelas (26.6)
- PPG (Team): Soviet Union (90.7)

The 1987 FIBA European Championship for Cadettes was the 7th edition of the European basketball championship for U16 women's teams, today known as FIBA U16 Women's European Championship. 12 teams featured in the competition, held in Gorzów Wielkopolski, Poland, from 26 July to 2 August 1987.

The Soviet Union won their seventh title in a row.

== Participating teams ==
- Bulgaria
- Czechoslovakia
- Finland
- France
- West Germany
- Hungary
- Italy
- Poland
- Romania
- Soviet Union
- Spain
- Yugoslavia

== Preliminary round ==
In the preliminary round, the twelve teams were allocated in two groups of six teams each. The top two teams of each group advanced to the semifinals. The third and fourth place of each group qualified for the 5th-8th playoffs. The last two teams of each group qualified for the 9th-12th playoffs.

=== Group A ===
Pos	Team	Pld	W	L	PF	PA	PD	Pts	Qualification	(Bulgaria)	(Socialist Federal Republic of Yugoslavia)	(Italy)	(Finland)	(Poland)	(Spain)
1	Bulgaria	5	5	0	383	339	+44	10	Advance to Semifinals	—	80–75	69–58	79–62	83–73	72–71
2	Yugoslavia	5	3	2	401	379	+22	8	Advance to Semifinals		—	89–68	66–80	83–69	88–82
3	Italy	5	2	3	318	344	−26	7 (Note: Head-to-head record: 1) ITA 1–1 (+4), FIN 1–1 (–1), POL 1–1 (–3).)	Transfer to 5th–8th playoff			—	62–64	58–52	72–70
4	Finland	5	2	3	335	346	−11	7	Transfer to 5th–8th playoff				—	67–70	62–69
5	Poland	5	2	3	351	376	−25	7	Transfer to 9th–12th playoff					—	87–85
6	Spain	5	1	4	377	381	−4	6	Transfer to 9th–12th playoff						—

Source: FIBA Archive
Rules for classification: 1) points; 2) head-to-head record.

=== Group B ===
Pos	Team	Pld	W	L	PF	PA	PD	Pts	Qualification	(Soviet Union)	(Czechoslovakia)	(Romania)	(France)	(West Germany)	(Hungary)
1	Soviet Union	5	5	0	454	299	+155	10	Advance to Semifinals	—	70–67	106–57	87–47	99–58	92–70
2	Czechoslovakia	5	4	1	396	322	+74	9	Advance to Semifinals		—	91–71	78–52	82–54	78–75
3	Romania	5	3	2	375	374	+1	8	Transfer to 5th–8th playoff			—	78–45	86–68	83–64
4	France	5	2	3	297	371	−74	7	Transfer to 5th–8th playoff				—	76–63	77–65
5	West Germany	5	1	4	312	407	−95	6	Transfer to 9th–12th playoff					—	69–64
6	Hungary	5	0	5	338	399	−61	5	Transfer to 9th–12th playoff						—

Source: FIBA Archive
Rules for classification: 1) points; 2) head-to-head record.

== Playoffs ==
=== 9th-12th playoff ===
Semifinals
August 1
West Germany	74
Spain	75
August 1
Poland	57
Hungary	84

9th place game
August 2
Spain	80
Hungary	76
11th place game
August 2
West Germany	82
Poland	81

=== 5th-8th playoff ===
Semifinals
August 1
Romania	92
Finland	59
August 1
Italy	52
France	53

5th place game
August 2
Romania	70
France	53
7th place game
August 2
Finland	53
Italy	66

=== Championship playoff ===
Semifinals
August 1
Soviet Union	98
Yugoslavia	83
August 1
Bulgaria	70
Czechoslovakia	81

Final
August 2
Soviet Union	83
Czechoslovakia	58
Bronze game
August 2
Yugoslavia	89
Bulgaria	72

== Final standings ==
Rank	Team
1st place, gold medalist(s)	Soviet Union
2nd place, silver medalist(s)	Czechoslovakia
3rd place, bronze medalist(s)	Yugoslavia
4th	Bulgaria
5th	Romania
6th	France
7th	Italy
8th	Finland
9th	Spain
10th	Hungary
11th	West Germany
12th	Poland

1987 FIBA Europe Women's Under-16 Championship winners

Soviet Union
7th title
