= 1984 FIBA European Championship for Cadettes =

5th FIBA Under-16 Women's European Basketball Championship

Tournament details
- Host country: Italy
- Dates: 8–15 July 1984
- Teams: 12
- Venue: (in 2 host cities)

Final positions
- Champions: Soviet Union (5th title)

Tournament statistics
- Top scorer: (Bulgaria) Dimitrova (24.4)
- PPG (Team): Soviet Union (91.6)

The 1984 FIBA European Championship for Cadettes was the fifth edition of the European basketball championship for U16 women's teams, today known as FIBA U16 Women's European Championship. 12 teams featured in the competition, held in Perugia and Marsciano, Italy, from 8 to 15 July 1984.

The Soviet Union won their fifth title in a row.

== Participating teams ==
- Austria
- Belgium
- Bulgaria
- France
- West Germany
- Hungary
- Italy
- Netherlands
- Romania
- Soviet Union
- Spain
- Yugoslavia

== Preliminary round ==
In the preliminary round, the twelve teams were allocated in two groups of six teams each. The top two teams of each group advanced to the semifinals. The third and fourth place of each group qualified for the 5th-8th playoffs. The last two teams of each group qualified for the 9th-12th playoffs.

=== Group A ===
Pos	Team	Pld	W	L	PF	PA	PD	Pts	Qualification	(Bulgaria)	(Soviet Union)	(Hungary)	(Spain)	(Belgium)	(Austria)
1	Bulgaria	5	5	0	455	271	+184	10	Advance to Semifinals	—	85–84	77–72	100–42	104–39	89–34
2	Soviet Union	5	4	1	483	300	+183	9	Advance to Semifinals		—	77–74	80–53	124–56	118–32
3	Hungary	5	3	2	393	288	+105	8	Transfer to 5th–8th playoff			—	70–67	88–36	89–31
4	Spain	5	2	3	275	337	−62	7	Transfer to 5th–8th playoff				—	49–48	64–39
5	Belgium	5	1	4	263	435	−172	6	Transfer to 9th–12th playoff					—	84–70
6	Austria	5	0	5	206	444	−238	5	Transfer to 9th–12th playoff						—

Source: FIBA Archive
Rules for classification: 1) points; 2) head-to-head record.

=== Group B ===
Pos	Team	Pld	W	L	PF	PA	PD	Pts	Qualification	(Italy)	(Netherlands)	(Romania)	(Socialist Federal Republic of Yugoslavia)	(France)	(West Germany)
1	Italy	5	4	1	349	318	+31	9	Advance to Semifinals	—	64–63	76–73	82–84	61–49	66–49
2	Netherlands	5	4	1	260	227	+33	9	Advance to Semifinals		—	44–37	42–37	61–55	50–34
3	Romania	5	3	2	352	316	+36	8	Transfer to 5th–8th playoff			—	77–71	78–70	87–55
4	Yugoslavia	5	3	2	326	263	+63	8	Transfer to 5th–8th playoff				—	67–36	67–26
5	France	5	1	4	268	317	−49	6	Transfer to 9th–12th playoff					—	58–50
6	West Germany	5	0	5	214	328	−114	5	Transfer to 9th–12th playoff						—

Source: FIBA Archive
Rules for classification: 1) points; 2) head-to-head record.

== Playoffs ==
=== 9th-12th playoff ===
Semifinals
July 14
Austria	59
France	66
July 14
Belgium	52
West Germany	50

9th place game
July 15
France	64
Belgium	55
11th place game
July 15
Austria	51
West Germany	73

=== 5th-8th playoff ===
Semifinals
July 14
Spain	72
Romania	89
July 14
Hungary	69
Yugoslavia	59

5th place game
July 15
Romania	76
Hungary	77
7th place game
July 15
Spain	53
Yugoslavia	74

=== Championship playoff ===
Semifinals
July 14
Soviet Union	86
Italy	80
July 14
Bulgaria	63
Netherlands	51

Final
July 15
Soviet Union	72
Bulgaria	67
Bronze game
July 15
Italy	69
Netherlands	66

== Final standings ==
Rank	Team
1st place, gold medalist(s)	Soviet Union
2nd place, silver medalist(s)	Bulgaria
3rd place, bronze medalist(s)	Italy
4th	Netherlands
5th	Romania
6th	Hungary
7th	Spain
8th	Yugoslavia
9th	France
10th	Belgium
11th	West Germany
12th	Austria

1984 FIBA Europe Women's Under-16 Championship winners

Soviet Union
5th title
