= 1991 FIBA European Championship for Cadettes =

9th FIBA Under-16 Women's European Basketball Championship

Tournament details
- Host country: Portugal
- Dates: 20–28 July 1991
- Teams: 12
- Venue: (in 3 host cities)

Final positions
- Champions: Soviet Union (8th title)

Tournament statistics
- Top scorer: (Socialist Federal Republic of Yugoslavia) Grgin-Fonseca (23.3)
- PPG (Team): Yugoslavia (84.9)

The 1991 FIBA European Championship for Cadettes was the 9th edition of the European basketball championship for U16 women's teams, today known as FIBA U16 Women's European Championship. 12 teams featured in the competition, held in Estarreja, Travassô e Óis da Ribeira and Anadia, Portugal, from 20 to 28 July 1991.

The Soviet Union won their eight and last title before their dissolution that same year.

== Participating teams ==
- Czechoslovakia
- France
- Greece
- Hungary
- Italy
- Netherlands
- Poland
- Portugal
- Romania
- Soviet Union
- Spain
- Yugoslavia

== Preliminary round ==
In the Preliminary Round, the twelve teams were allocated in two groups of six teams each. The top two teams of each group advanced to the semifinals. The third and fourth place of each group qualified for the 5th-8th playoffs. The last two teams of each group qualified for the 9th-12th playoffs.

=== Group A ===
Pos	Team	Pld	W	L	PF	PA	PD	Pts	Qualification	(Socialist Federal Republic of Yugoslavia)	(Soviet Union)	(France)	(Poland)	(Romania)	(Portugal)
1	Yugoslavia	5	5	0	444	323	+121	10	Advance to Semifinals	—	83–69	92–81	90–56	93–60	86–57
2	Soviet Union	5	4	1	390	304	+86	9	Advance to Semifinals		—	63–54	104–71	78–51	76–45
3	France	5	3	2	379	347	+32	8	Transfer to 5th–8th playoff			—	82–64	82–64	80–64
4	Poland	5	2	3	331	380	−49	7	Transfer to 5th–8th playoff				—	68–58	72–46
5	Romania	5	1	4	312	390	−78	6	Transfer to 9th–12th playoff					—	79–69
6	Portugal	5	0	5	281	393	−112	5	Transfer to 9th–12th playoff						—

Source: FIBA Archive
Rules for classification: 1) points; 2) head-to-head record.

=== Group B ===
Pos	Team	Pld	W	L	PF	PA	PD	Pts	Qualification	(Italy)	(Hungary)	(Greece)	(Czechoslovakia)	(Netherlands)	(Spain)
1	Italy	5	4	1	339	291	+48	9	Advance to Semifinals	—	93–68	72–50	52–72	62–45	60–56
2	Hungary	5	4	1	357	339	+18	9	Advance to Semifinals		—	74–58	76–65	66–57	73–66
3	Greece	5	3	2	292	292	0	8	Transfer to 5th–8th playoff			—	68–62	55–38	61–46
4	Czechoslovakia	5	3	2	338	286	+52	8	Transfer to 5th–8th playoff				—	57–33	82–57
5	Netherlands	5	1	4	224	290	−66	6	Transfer to 9th–12th playoff					—	51–50
6	Spain	5	0	5	275	327	−52	5	Transfer to 9th–12th playoff						—

Source: FIBA Archive
Rules for classification: 1) points; 2) head-to-head record.

== Playoffs ==
=== 9th-12th playoff ===
Semifinals
July 26
Portugal	44
Netherlands	46
July 26
Romania	49
Spain	54

9th place game
July 27
Netherlands	41
Spain	44
11th place game
July 27
Portugal	34
Romania	58

=== 5th-8th playoff ===
Semifinals
July 27
Poland	40
Greece	48
July 27
France	67
Czechoslovakia	69

5th place game
July 28
Greece	54
Czechoslovakia	48
7th place game
July 28
Poland	60
France	54

=== Championship playoff ===
Semifinals
July 27
Soviet Union	71
Italy	70
July 27
Yugoslavia	75
Hungary	59

Final
July 28
Soviet Union	84
Yugoslavia	75
Bronze game
July 28
Italy	79
Hungary	72

== Final standings ==
Rank	Team
1st place, gold medalist(s)	Soviet Union
2nd place, silver medalist(s)	Yugoslavia
3rd place, bronze medalist(s)	Italy
4th	Hungary
5th	Greece
6th	Czechoslovakia
7th	Poland
8th	France
9th	Spain
10th	Netherlands
11th	Romania
12th	Portugal

1991 FIBA Europe Women's Under-16 Championship winners

Soviet Union
8th title
