= 1985 FIBA European Championship for Cadettes =

6th FIBA Under-16 Women's European Basketball Championship

Tournament details
- Host country: Yugoslavia
- Dates: 20–27 July 1985
- Teams: 12
- Venue: (in 1 host city)

Final positions
- Champions: Soviet Union (6th title)

Tournament statistics
- Top scorer: (Socialist Federal Republic of Yugoslavia) Nakić (24.9)
- PPG (Team): Soviet Union (90.1)

The 1985 FIBA European Championship for Cadettes was the 6th edition of the European basketball championship for U16 women's teams, today known as FIBA U16 Women's European Championship. 12 teams featured in the competition, held in Tuzla, then Yugoslavia, from 20 to 27 July 1985.

The Soviet Union won their sixth title in a row.

== Participating teams ==
- Belgium
- Bulgaria
- Finland
- France
- West Germany
- Hungary
- Italy
- Netherlands
- Romania
- Soviet Union
- Spain
- Yugoslavia

== Preliminary round ==
In the preliminary round, the twelve teams were allocated in two groups of six teams each. The top two teams of each group advanced to the semifinals. The third and fourth place of each group qualified for the 5th-8th playoffs. The last two teams of each group qualified for the 9th-12th playoffs.

=== Group A ===
Pos	Team	Pld	W	L	PF	PA	PD	Pts	Qualification	(Soviet Union)	(Italy)	(Romania)	(France)	(Spain)	(Finland)
1	Soviet Union	5	5	0	466	230	+236	10	Advance to Semifinals	—	85–84	77–72	100–42	104–39	89–34
2	Italy	5	4	1	349	296	+53	9	Advance to Semifinals		—	77–74	80–53	124–56	118–32
3	Romania	5	3	2	343	284	+59	8	Transfer to 5th–8th playoff			—	70–67	88–36	89–31
4	France	5	2	3	278	336	−58	7	Transfer to 5th–8th playoff				—	49–48	64–39
5	Spain	5	1	4	285	345	−60	6	Transfer to 9th–12th playoff					—	84–70
6	Finland	5	0	5	221	451	−230	5	Transfer to 9th–12th playoff						—

Source: FIBA Archive
Rules for classification: 1) points; 2) head-to-head record.

=== Group B ===
Pos	Team	Pld	W	L	PF	PA	PD	Pts	Qualification	(Socialist Federal Republic of Yugoslavia)	(Hungary)	(Bulgaria)	(Netherlands)	(Belgium)	(West Germany)
1	Yugoslavia	5	5	0	412	255	+157	10	Advance to Semifinals	—	64–63	76–73	82–84	61–49	66–49
2	Hungary	5	4	1	391	290	+101	9	Advance to Semifinals		—	44–37	42–37	61–55	50–34
3	Bulgaria	5	3	2	370	348	+22	8	Transfer to 5th–8th playoff			—	77–71	78–70	87–55
4	Netherlands	5	2	3	310	348	−38	7	Transfer to 5th–8th playoff				—	67–36	67–26
5	Belgium	5	1	4	252	365	−113	6	Transfer to 9th–12th playoff					—	58–50
6	West Germany	5	0	5	266	385	−119	5	Transfer to 9th–12th playoff						—

Source: FIBA Archive
Rules for classification: 1) points; 2) head-to-head record.

== Playoffs ==
=== 9th-12th playoff ===
Semifinals
July 26
Belgium	53
Finland	47
July 26
Spain	58
West Germany	47

9th place game
July 27
Belgium	51
Spain	84
11th place game
July 27
Finland	55
West Germany	65

=== 5th-8th playoff ===
Semifinals
July 26
France	63
Bulgaria	66
July 26
Romania	88
Netherlands	42

5th place game
July 27
Bulgaria	56
Romania	60
7th place game
July 27
France	54
Netherlands	65

=== Championship playoff ===
Semifinals
July 26
Soviet Union	87
Hungary	67
July 26
Yugoslavia	66
Italy	70

Final
July 27
Soviet Union	78
Italy	55
Bronze game
July 27
Yugoslavia	53
Hungary	50

== Final standings ==
Rank	Team
1st place, gold medalist(s)	Soviet Union
2nd place, silver medalist(s)	Italy
3rd place, bronze medalist(s)	Yugoslavia
4th	Hungary
5th	Romania
6th	Bulgaria
7th	Netherlands
8th	France
9th	Spain
10th	Belgium
11th	West Germany
12th	Finland

1985 FIBA Europe Women's Under-16 Championship winners

Soviet Union
6th title
