= Netherlands women's national under-17 basketball team =

Netherlands youth basketball team

Netherlands
- FIBA zone: FIBA Europe
- National federation: Basketball Nederland

U17 World Cup
- Appearances: 1
- Medals: None

U16 EuroBasket
- Appearances: 14
- Medals: None

U16 EuroBasket Division B
- Appearances: 14
- Medals: Gold: 1 (2009); Bronze: 2 (2014, 2016)

The Netherlands women's national under-16 and under-17 basketball team is a national youth basketball team of the Netherlands, administered by Basketball Nederland. It represents the country in international under-16 and under-17 women's basketball competitions.

== FIBA U16 Women's EuroBasket participations ==
Year	Division A	Division B
1976	6th	
1978	9th	
1982	10th	
1984	4th	
1985	7th	
1989	12th	
1991	10th	
2004		13th/14th
2005		11th
2006		14th
2007		8th
2008		6th
2009		1st place, gold medalist(s)
2010	7th	

Year	Division A	Division B
2011	9th	
2012	12th	
2013	14th	
2014		3rd place, bronze medalist(s)
2015	15th	
2016		3rd place, bronze medalist(s)
2017	13th	
2018	16th	
2019		13th
2022		10th
2023		10th
2024		11th
2025		6th
2026		Rank 4 trio

== FIBA Under-17 Women's Basketball World Cup participations ==
Year	Result
2012	8th

== See also ==
- Netherlands women's national basketball team
- Netherlands women's national under-19 basketball team
- Netherlands men's national under-16 basketball team
