= Czechoslovakia women's national under-16 basketball team =

Czechoslovakia
- FIBA zone: FIBA Europe
- National federation: Basketball Federation of Czechoslovakia

U16 EuroBasket
- Appearances: 5
- Medals: Gold: 1 (1989); Silver: 1 (1987)

The Czechoslovakia women's national under-16 basketball team was a national basketball team of Czechoslovakia, administered by the Basketball Federation of Czechoslovakia. It represented the country in international under-16 women's basketball competitions.

== FIBA U16 Women's EuroBasket participations ==
Year	Result in Division A
1976	4th
1980	5th
1987	2nd place, silver medalist(s)
1989	1st place, gold medalist(s)
1991	6th

== See also ==
- Czechoslovakia women's national basketball team
- Czechoslovakia women's national under-19 basketball team
- Czechoslovakia men's national under-16 basketball team
