= 1980 FIBA European Championship for Cadettes =

3rd FIBA Under-16 Women's European Basketball Championship

Tournament details
- Host country: Hungary
- Dates: 6–14 August 1980
- Teams: 12
- Venue: (in 2 host cities)

Final positions
- Champions: Soviet Union (3rd title)

The 1980 FIBA European Championship for Cadettes was the third edition of the European basketball championship for U16 women's teams, today known as FIBA U16 Women's European Championship. 12 teams featured in the competition, held in Zalaegerszeg and Pécs, Hungary, from 6 to 14 August 1980.

The Soviet Union won their third title in a row.

== Participating teams ==
- Bulgaria
- Czechoslovakia
- France
- West Germany
- Hungary
- Italy
- Poland
- Romania
- Soviet Union
- Spain
- Sweden
- Yugoslavia

== Preliminary round ==
In the preliminary round, the twelve teams were allocated in two groups of six teams each. The top three teams of each group advanced to the final group. The last three teams of each group qualified for the classification group.

Team advanced to the finals
Team competed in the classification round

=== Group A ===
Team	Pld	W	L	PF	PA	PD	Pts
Soviet Union	5	5	0	456	270	+186	10
Romania	5	4	1	372	369	+3	9
Czechoslovakia	5	3	2	333	353	−20	8
Yugoslavia	5	2	3	355	358	−3	7
Poland	5	1	4	307	365	−58	6
Spain	5	0	5	348	456	−108	5

	(Soviet Union)	(Romania)	(Czechoslovakia)	(Socialist Federal Republic of Yugoslavia)	(Poland)	(Spain)
Soviet Union	—	—	78–53	83–61	90–52	—
Romania	66–98	—	—	—	—	80–68
Czechoslovakia	—	63–70	—	70–66	52–51	95–88
Yugoslavia	—	78–79	—	—	66–52	—
Poland	—	62–77	—	—	—	90–80
Spain	38–107	—	—	74–84	—	—

=== Group B ===
Team	Pld	W	L	PF	PA	PD	Pts
Italy	5	5	0	334	307	+27	10
Bulgaria	5	4	1	374	322	+52	9
Hungary	5	3	2	329	327	+2	8
France	5	2	3	289	298	−9	7
Sweden	5	1	4	295	329	−34	6
West Germany	5	0	5	280	318	−38	5

	(Italy)	(Bulgaria)	(Hungary)	(France)	(Sweden)	(West Germany)
Italy	—	74–67	—	—	72–60	—
Bulgaria	—	—	84–66	—	72–64	81–68
Hungary	72–74	—	—	63–52	71–61	57–56
France	52–54	50–70	—	—	—	—
Sweden	—	—	—	56–69	—	54–45
West Germany	56–60	—	—	55–66	—	—

== Classification round ==
In this stage, the last three teams of each group of the preliminary round competed for the 7th-12th place. The games between teams of the same group in the previous round were taken into account.

=== Group X ===
Team	Pld	W	L	PF	PA	PD	Pts	Tie
Yugoslavia	5	5	0	352	291	+61	10	
Poland	5	4	1	298	290	+8	9	
France	5	3	2	321	302	+19	8	
Spain	5	1	4	352	366	−14	6	1–1 (+8)
Sweden	5	1	4	266	291	−25	6	1–1 (–2)
West Germany	5	1	4	259	308	−49	6	1–1 (–6)

	(Socialist Federal Republic of Yugoslavia)	(Poland)	(France)	(Spain)	(Sweden)	(West Germany)
Yugoslavia	—	—	58–56	—	—	76–50
Poland	—	—	—	—	46–45	58–52
France	—	47–52	—	—	—	—
Spain	—	—	81–83	—	63–52	—
Sweden	59–68	—	—	—	—	—
West Germany	—	—	—	57–54	—	—

== Finals ==
In this stage, the top three teams of each group of the preliminary round competed for the Championship. The games between teams of the same group in the previous round were taken into account.

=== Group X ===
Team	Pld	W	L	PF	PA	PD	Pts
Soviet Union	5	5	0	452	317	+135	10
Italy	5	4	1	376	373	+3	9
Bulgaria	5	3	2	379	397	−18	8
Romania	5	2	3	359	403	−44	7
Czechoslovakia	5	1	4	338	369	−31	6
Hungary	5	0	5	343	388	−45	5

	(Soviet Union)	(Italy)	(Bulgaria)	(Romania)	(Czechoslovakia)	(Hungary)
Soviet Union	—	106–79	93–50	—	—	—
Italy	—	—	—	76–66	—	—
Bulgaria	—	—	—	—	83–82	—
Romania	—	—	82–95	—	—	75–71
Czechoslovakia	—	62–73	—	—	—	—
Hungary	69–77	—	—	—	65–78	—

== Final standings ==
Rank	Team
1st place, gold medalist(s)	Soviet Union
2nd place, silver medalist(s)	Italy
3rd place, bronze medalist(s)	Bulgaria
4th	Romania
5th	Czechoslovakia
6th	Hungary
7th	Yugoslavia
8th	Poland
9th	France
10th	Spain
11th	Sweden
12th	West Germany

1980 FIBA Europe Women's Under-16 Championship winners

Soviet Union
3rd title
