= Italy women's national under-17 basketball team =

Italy
- FIBA zone: FIBA Europe
- National federation: Federazione Italiana Pallacanestro
- Coach: Maria Buzzanca

U17 World Cup
- Appearances: 6
- Medals: Silver: 1 (2016)

U16 EuroBasket
- Appearances: 33
- Medals: Gold: 1 (2018); Silver: 6 (1978, 1980, 1985, 1995, 2008, 2012); Bronze: 8 (1982, 1984, 1991, 1993, 2011, 2015, 2017, 2023)

U16 EuroBasket Division B
- Appearances: 2
- Medals: Gold: 1 (2007)
| Home | Away |

The Italy women's national under-16 and under-17 basketball team is a national basketball team of Italy, administered by the Italian Basketball Federation. It represents the country in under-16 and under-17 women's international basketball competitions.

They won the title at the 2018 FIBA U16 Women's European Championship.

== Tournament record ==
=== FIBA Under-17 World Cup ===
| Year | Pos. | Pld | W | L |
|---|---|---|---|---|
| (France) 2010 | Did not qualify | | | |
| (Netherlands) 2012 | 6th | 8 | 5 | 3 |
| (Czech Republic) 2014 | 13th | 7 | 3 | 4 |
| (Spain) 2016 | 2nd place, silver medalist(s) | 7 | 5 | 2 |
| (Belarus) 2018 | 5th | 7 | 5 | 2 |
| (Hungary) 2022 | Did not qualify | | | |
| (Mexico) 2024 | 7th | 7 | 5 | 2 |
| (Czech Republic) 2026 | 10th | 7 | 3 | 4 |
| (Indonesia) 2028 | Did not qualify | | | |
| Total | 6/9 | 43 | 26 | 17 |

== FIBA U16 EuroBasket ==
| Year | Division A | Division B |
|---|---|---|
| 1976 | 9th | |
| 1978 | 2nd place, silver medalist(s) | |
| 1980 | 2nd place, silver medalist(s) | |
| 1982 | 3rd place, bronze medalist(s) | |
| 1984 | 3rd place, bronze medalist(s) | |
| 1985 | 2nd place, silver medalist(s) | |
| 1987 | 7th | |
| 1989 | 5th | |
| 1991 | 3rd place, bronze medalist(s) | |
| 1993 | 3rd place, bronze medalist(s) | |
| 1995 | 2nd place, silver medalist(s) | |
| 1997 | 11th | |
| 2001 | 8th | |
| 2003 | 10th | |
| 2004 | 5th | |
| 2005 | 15th | |
| 2006 | | 4th |
| 2007 | | 1st place, gold medalist(s) |

| Year | Division A |
|---|---|
| 2008 | 2nd place, silver medalist(s) |
| 2009 | 6th |
| 2010 | 13th |
| 2011 | 3rd place, bronze medalist(s) |
| 2012 | 2nd place, silver medalist(s) |
| 2013 | 4th |
| 2014 | 9th |
| 2015 | 3rd place, bronze medalist(s) |
| 2016 | 4th |
| 2017 | 3rd place, bronze medalist(s) |
| 2018 | 1st place, gold medalist(s) |
| 2019 | 5th |
| 2022 | 8th |
| 2023 | 3rd place, bronze medalist(s) |
| 2024 | 4th |
| 2025 | 6th |
| 2026 | 14th |

== See also ==
- Italy women's national basketball team
- Italy women's national under-19 basketball team
- Italy men's national under-17 basketball team
