= 1978 FIBA European Championship for Cadettes =

2nd FIBA Under-16 Women's European Basketball Championship

Tournament details
- Host country: Spain
- Dates: 14–24 August 1978
- Teams: 15
- Venue: (in 1 host city)

Final positions
- Champions: Soviet Union (2nd title)

The 1978 FIBA European Championship for Cadettes was the second edition of the European basketball championship for U16 women's teams, today known as FIBA U16 Women's European Championship. 16 teams featured in the competition, held in Cuenca, Spain from 14 to 24 August 1978.

The Soviet Union won their second title in a row.

== Participating teams ==
- Belgium
- Bulgaria
- Finland
- France
- West Germany
- Israel
- Italy
- Netherlands
- Poland
- Romania
- Scotland
- Soviet Union
- Spain
- Tunisia
- Yugoslavia

== Preliminary round ==
In the PReliminary Round, the fifteen teams were allocated in two groups, one of eight teams and one of seven teams. The top two teams of each group qualified for the Semifinals. The third and fourth team of each group competed in the 5th-8th playoff. The fifth and sixth team of each group competed in the 9th-12th playoff. The seventh of each team competed in the 13th-14th playoff.

Team advanced to the Semifinals
Team competed in the 5th-8th Playoff
Team competed in the 9th-12th Playoff
Team competed in the 13th-14th Playoff

=== Group A ===
Team	Pld	W	L	PF	PA	PD	Pts
Soviet Union	7	7	0	741	341	+400	14
Italy	7	6	1	675	364	+311	13
Poland	7	5	2	577	404	+173	12
Finland	7	4	3	522	458	+64	11
Spain	7	3	4	425	446	−21	10
Netherlands	7	2	5	371	446	−75	9
Scotland	7	1	6	285	543	−258	8
Tunisia	7	0	7	184	778	−594	7

	(Soviet Union)	(Italy)	(Poland)	(Finland)	(Spain)	(Netherlands)	(Scotland)	(Tunisia)
Soviet Union	—	—	94–59	—	109–43	—	—	140–25
Italy	76–86	—	82–76	—	—	80–35	—	—
Poland	—	—	—	74–64	65–62	—	—	126–22
Finland	56–109	69–107	—	—	—	67–45	—	—
Spain	—	50–91	—	61–67	—	50–38	—	—
Netherlands	48–100	—	44–84	—	—	—	—	107–31
Scotland	34–103	30–122	36–93	35–74	40–72	34–54	—	76–25
Tunisia	—	18–117	—	27–125	36–87	—	—	—

=== Group B ===
Team	Pld	W	L	PF	PA	PD	Pts	Tie
Bulgaria	6	6	0	564	352	+212	12	
Romania	6	4	2	496	374	+122	10	1–1 (+6)
Yugoslavia	6	4	2	402	367	+35	10	1–1 (+3)
France	6	4	2	436	364	+72	10	1–1 (–9)
West Germany	6	2	4	286	401	−115	8	
Belgium	6	1	5	344	457	−113	7	
Israel	6	0	6	290	503	−213	6	

	(Bulgaria)	(Romania)	(Socialist Federal Republic of Yugoslavia)	(France)	(West Germany)	(Belgium)	(Israel)
Bulgaria	—	—	100–70	76–67	—	89–64	—
Romania	69–99	—	—	74–60	—	105–60	—
Yugoslavia	—	65–57	—	—	58–42	—	77–57
France	—	—	62–57	—	66–50	—	—
West Germany	47–86	45–96	—	—	—	—	52–49
Belgium	—	—	49–75	60–81	46–50	—	—
Israel	35–114	45–95	—	47–100	—	57–65	—

== Playoffs ==
=== 13th-14th playoff ===
23 August 1978
08:30

Boxscore

Scotland	35–63	Israel
Scoring by half: 14-32, 21-31

=== 9th-12th playoff ===
Semifinals
August 23
West Germany	54
Netherlands	60
August 23
Spain	66
Belgium	67

9th place game
August 24
Netherlands	53
Belgium	42
11th place game
August 24
West Germany	47
Spain	63

=== 5th-8th playoff ===
Semifinals
August 23
Poland	67
France	66
August 23
Yugoslavia	67
Finland	60

5th place game
August 24
Poland	73
Yugoslavia	53
7th place game
August 24
France	79
Finland	62

=== Championship playoff ===
Semifinals
August 23
Soviet Union	84
Romania	67
August 23
Bulgaria	86
Italy	87

Final
August 24
Soviet Union	77
Italy	62
Bronze game
August 24
Bulgaria	107
Romania	84

== Final standings ==
Rank	Team
1st place, gold medalist(s)	Soviet Union
2nd place, silver medalist(s)	Italy
3rd place, bronze medalist(s)	Bulgaria
4th	Romania
5th	Poland
6th	Yugoslavia
7th	France
8th	Finland
9th	Netherlands
10th	Belgium
11th	Spain
12th	West Germany
13th	Israel
14th	Scotland
15th	Tunisia

1978 FIBA Europe Women's Under-16 Championship winners

Soviet Union
2nd title
