= 1989 FIBA European Championship for Cadettes =

8th FIBA Under-16 Women's European Basketball Championship

Tournament details
- Host country: Romania
- Dates: 5–12 August 1989
- Teams: 12
- Venue: (in 1 host city)

Final positions
- Champions: Czechoslovakia (1st title)

Tournament statistics
- Top scorer: (Greece) Vardaki (17)
- PPG (Team): Soviet Union (68.4)

The 1989 FIBA European Championship for Cadettes was the 8th edition of the European basketball championship for U16 women's teams, today known as FIBA U16 Women's European Championship. 12 teams featured in the competition, held in Timișoara, Romania, from 5 to 12 August 1989.

Czechoslovakia won their first and only title before their dissolution four years later. It was the first time that a team other than the Soviet Union won the title.

== Participating teams ==
- Czechoslovakia
- France
- West Germany
- Greece
- Hungary
- Italy
- Netherlands
- Poland
- Romania
- Soviet Union
- Spain
- Yugoslavia

== Preliminary round ==
In the preliminary round, the twelve teams were allocated in two groups of six teams each. The top two teams of each group advanced to the semifinals. The third and fourth place of each group qualified for the 5th-8th playoffs. The last two teams of each group qualified for the 9th-12th playoffs.

=== Group A ===
Pos	Team	Pld	W	L	PF	PA	PD	Pts	Qualification	(Soviet Union)	(Spain)	(Socialist Federal Republic of Yugoslavia)	(France)	(Poland)	(Greece)
1	Soviet Union	5	5	0	350	204	+146	10	Advance to Semifinals	—	62–50	68–52	67–37	79–35	74–30
2	Spain	5	3	2	298	245	+53	8	Advance to Semifinals		—	54–48	68–30	76–53	50–52
3	Yugoslavia	5	3	2	293	284	+9	8	Transfer to 5th–8th playoff			—	58–48	67–49	65–65
4	France	5	2	3	217	280	−63	7	Transfer to 5th–8th playoff				—	45–44	57–43
5	Poland	5	1	4	236	316	−80	6	Transfer to 9th–12th playoff					—	55–49
6	Greece	5	1	4	239	304	−65	6	Transfer to 9th–12th playoff						—

Source: FIBA Archive
Rules for classification: 1) points; 2) head-to-head record.

=== Group B ===
Pos	Team	Pld	W	L	PF	PA	PD	Pts	Qualification	(Czechoslovakia)	(Romania)	(Italy)	(West Germany)	(Hungary)	(Netherlands)
1	Czechoslovakia	5	5	0	302	232	+70	10	Advance to Semifinals	—	62–57	51–47	58–40	72–53	59–35
2	Romania	5	4	1	314	242	+72	9	Advance to Semifinals		—	59–57	67–34	72–60	59–29
3	Italy	5	2	3	282	248	+34	7 (Note: Head-to-head record: 1) ITA 1–1 (+19), FRG 1–1 (–2), HUN 1–1 (–17).)	Transfer to 5th–8th playoff			—	69–71	61–40	48–27
4	West Germany	5	2	3	251	280	−29	7	Transfer to 5th–8th playoff				—	55–59	51–27
5	Hungary	5	2	3	270	301	−31	7	Transfer to 9th–12th playoff					—	58–41
6	Netherlands	5	0	5	159	275	−116	5	Transfer to 9th–12th playoff						—

Source: FIBA Archive
Rules for classification: 1) points; 2) head-to-head record.

== Playoffs ==
=== 9th-12th playoff ===
Semifinals
August 11
Greece	59
Hungary	55
August 11
Poland	56
Netherlands	45

9th place game
August 12
Greece	54
Poland	52
11th place game
August 12
Hungary	74
Netherlands	47

=== 5th-8th playoff ===
Semifinals
August 11
France	41
Italy	50
August 11
Yugoslavia	48
West Germany	51

5th place game
August 12
Italy	64
West Germany	36
7th place game
August 12
France	47
Yugoslavia	55

=== Championship playoff ===
Semifinals
August 11
Czechoslovakia	78
Spain	60
August 11
Soviet Union	34
Romania	39

Final
August 12
Czechoslovakia	58
Romania	57
Bronze game
August 12
Soviet Union	95
Spain	66

== Final standings ==
Rank	Team
1st place, gold medalist(s)	Czechoslovakia
2nd place, silver medalist(s)	Romania
3rd place, bronze medalist(s)	Soviet Union
4th	Spain
5th	Italy
6th	West Germany
7th	Yugoslavia
8th	France
9th	Greece
10th	Poland
11th	Hungary
12th	Netherlands

1989 FIBA Europe Women's Under-16 Championship winners

Czechoslovakia
1st title
