= 1976 FIBA European Championship for Cadettes =

1st FIBA Under-16 Women's European Basketball Championship

Tournament details
- Host country: Poland
- Dates: 14–22 August 1976
- Teams: 16
- Venue: (in 1 host city)

Final positions
- Champions: Soviet Union (1st title)

The 1976 FIBA European Championship for Cadettes was the first edition of the European basketball championship for U16 women's teams, today known as FIBA U16 Women's European Championship. 16 teams featured in the competition, held in Szczecin, Poland from 14 to 22 August 1976.

The Soviet Union won their first title.

== Participating teams ==
- Belgium
- Bulgaria
- Czechoslovakia
- Finland
- Hungary
- Israel
- Italy
- Netherlands
- Poland
- Romania
- Scotland
- Soviet Union
- Spain
- Sweden
- Switzerland
- Yugoslavia

== First round ==
In the first round, fifteen teams (all of them except Poland, with a bye to the Final Round as hosts) were allocated in five groups of three teams each. The top teams of each group qualified for the Final Round. The last two teams of each group played the Classification Round.

Team advanced to the Final Round
Team competed in the Classification Round Group 1
Team competed in the Classification Round Group 2

=== Group A ===
Team	Pld	W	L	PF	PA	PD	Pts
Soviet Union	2	2	0	226	82	+144	4
Yugoslavia	2	1	1	160	116	+44	3
Scotland	2	0	2	59	247	−188	2

	(Soviet Union)	(Socialist Federal Republic of Yugoslavia)	(Scotland)
Soviet Union	—	—	139–30
Yugoslavia	52–87	—	—
Scotland	—	29–108	—

=== Group B ===
Team	Pld	W	L	PF	PA	PD	Pts
Hungary	2	2	0	141	97	+44	4
Italy	2	1	1	112	112	0	3
Finland	2	0	2	102	146	−44	2

	(Hungary)	(Italy)	(Finland)
Hungary	—	56–51	—
Italy	—	—	71–56
Finland	46–85	—	—

=== Group C ===
Team	Pld	W	L	PF	PA	PD	Pts
Czechoslovakia	2	2	0	177	61	+116	4
Israel	2	1	1	123	148	−25	3
Sweden	2	0	2	77	168	−91	2

	(Czechoslovakia)	(Israel)	(Sweden)
Czechoslovakia	—	—	81–25
Israel	36–96	—	—
Sweden	—	52–87	—

=== Group D ===
Team	Pld	W	L	PF	PA	PD	Pts
Bulgaria	2	2	0	180	118	+62	4
Romania	2	1	1	163	133	+30	3
Belgium	2	0	2	88	180	−92	2

	(Bulgaria)	(Romania)	(Belgium)
Bulgaria	—	—	98–37
Romania	81–82	—	—
Belgium	—	51–82	—

=== Group E ===
Team	Pld	W	L	PF	PA	PD	Pts
Netherlands	2	2	0	165	92	+73	4
Spain	2	1	1	142	120	+22	3
Switzerland	2	0	2	81	176	−95	2

	(Netherlands)	(Spain)	(Switzerland)
Netherlands	—	—	93–33
Spain	59–72	—	—
Switzerland	—	48–83	—

== Classification round ==
Ten advancing teams from the first round were allocated in two groups of five teams each. Group 1 decided the 7th–11th place. Group 2 decided the 12th–16th place.

=== Group 1 ===
Team	Pld	W	L	PF	PA	PD	Pts	Tie
Yugoslavia	4	4	0	299	233	+66	8	
Romania	4	3	1	284	239	+45	7	
Italy	4	1	3	233	234	−1	5	1–1 (+17)
Spain	4	1	3	222	276	−54	5	1–1 (–7)
Israel	4	1	3	227	293	−66	5	1–1 (–10)

	(Socialist Federal Republic of Yugoslavia)	(Romania)	(Italy)	(Spain)	(Israel)
Yugoslavia	—	—	67–54	73–52	—
Romania	59–76	—	64–59	—	80–49
Italy	—	—	—	—	69–49
Spain	—	55–81	54–51	—	—
Israel	58–83	—	—	71–61	—

=== Group 2 ===
Team	Pld	W	L	PF	PA	PD	Pts
Finland	4	4	0	291	163	+128	8
Belgium	4	3	1	235	183	+52	7
Sweden	4	2	2	232	212	+20	6
Scotland	4	1	3	192	275	−83	5
Switzerland	4	0	4	154	271	−117	4

	(Finland)	(Belgium)	(Sweden)	(Scotland)	(Switzerland)
Finland	—	—	72–34	—	—
Belgium	49–68	—	58–40	71–39	—
Sweden	—	—	—	78–36	80–46
Scotland	59–75	—	—	—	58–51
Switzerland	21–76	36–57	—	—	—

== Final round ==
The five Preliminary Round group winners and Poland (as hosts) played the Final Round. The winner of the group wins the tournament.

Team	Pld	W	L	PF	PA	PD	Pts	Tie
Soviet Union	5	5	0	500	248	+252	10	
Hungary	5	4	1	325	291	+34	9	
Bulgaria	5	2	3	316	328	−12	7	1–1 (+17)
Czechoslovakia	5	2	3	285	297	−12	7	1–1 (+5)
Poland	5	2	3	254	341	−87	7	1–1 (–22)
Netherlands	5	0	5	220	395	−175	5	

	(Soviet Union)	(Hungary)	(Bulgaria)	(Czechoslovakia)	(Poland)	(Netherlands)
Soviet Union	—	99–57	—	—	89–50	124–39
Hungary	—	—	—	55–45	72–40	—
Bulgaria	59–94	66–77	—	56–63	—	—
Czechoslovakia	43–94	—	—	—	—	83–39
Poland	—	—	49–73	53–51	—	—
Netherlands	—	41–64	45–62	—	56–62	—

== Final standings ==
Rank	Team
1st place, gold medalist(s)	Soviet Union
2nd place, silver medalist(s)	Hungary
3rd place, bronze medalist(s)	Bulgaria
4th	Czechoslovakia
5th	Poland
6th	Netherlands
7th	Yugoslavia
8th	Romania
9th	Italy
10th	Spain
11th	Israel
12th	Finland
13th	Belgium
14th	Scotland
15th	Sweden
16th	Switzerland

1976 FIBA Europe Women's Under-16 Championship winners

Soviet Union
1st title
