= 2017 FIBA U16 Women's European Championship =

29th FIBA Under-16 Women's European Basketball Championship

Tournament details
- Host country: France
- Dates: 4–12 August 2017
- Teams: 16
- Venues: 2 (in 1 host city)

Final positions
- Champions: France (3rd title)

Tournament statistics
- MVP: (France) Iliana Rupert
- Top scorer: (Russia) Pavliuchenko (15.9)
- Top rebounds: (Germany) Bessoir (14.0)
- Top assists: (Croatia) Mühl (6.7)
- PPG (Team): France (70.6)
- RPG (Team): France (51.6)
- APG (Team): Spain (19.9)

Official website
- www.fiba.basketball

The 2017 FIBA U16 Women's European Championship was the 29th edition of the Women's European basketball championship for national under-16 teams. It was played from 4 to 12 August 2017 in Bourges, France.

France won their 3rd championship title by beating Hungary in the final, 63–55.

== Venues ==
Bourges		2017 FIBA U16 Women's European Championship is located in France
Palais des sports du Prado	CREPS	2017 FIBA U16 Women's European Championship is located in France
Capacity: 5,000	Capacity: 200	2017 FIBA U16 Women's European Championship is located in France

== Participating teams ==
- Belarus
- Croatia
- Czech Republic
- France (Host)
- Germany
- Hungary
- Italy
- Latvia
- Lithuania
- Netherlands ▲ (3rd place, 2016 FIBA U16 Women's European Championship Division B)
- Poland ▲ (Winners, 2016 FIBA U16 Women's European Championship Division B)
- Romania ▲ (Runners-up, 2016 FIBA U16 Women's European Championship Division B)
- Russia
- Serbia
- Spain
- Turkey

== First round ==
The first-round groups draw took place on 10 December 2016 in Prague, Czech Republic.

=== Group A ===
Pos	Team	Pld	W	L	PF	PA	PD	Pts
1	Spain	3	3	0	145	95	+50	6
2	Russia	3	2	1	169	102	+67	5
3	Poland	3	1	2	103	125	−22	4
4	Lithuania	3	0	3	94	189	−95	3

Source: FIBA

August 4
14:00

Boxscore

Lithuania	36–85	Spain
Scoring by quarter: 15–27, 6–19, 6–19, 9–20
Pts: Jankauskaite 10; Rebs: Visockaite 9 Asts: Sinickaite 3		Pts: Garcia 18; Rebs: Hermosa, Carrera 7 Asts: Mendez, Hernandez 6

Palais des Sports du Prado, Bourges
Referees: Yohan Rosso (FRA), Alin Faur (ROU), Özlem Yalman (TUR)

August 4
16:15

Boxscore

Poland	44–65	Russia
Scoring by quarter: 14–13, 11–25, 10–8, 9–19
Pts: Kurach 11; Rebs: Kurach 8 Asts: Hipp, Kulinska 4		Pts: Pavliuchenko 17; Rebs: Pavliuchenko 15; Asts: Kuznetsova 5

Palais des Sports du Prado, Bourges
Referees: Antonis Demetriou (CYP), Milosav Kaludjerovic (MNE), Alexandru Olaru (ROU)

August 5
14:00

Boxscore

Spain	60–59	Poland
Scoring by quarter: 17–14, 16–19, 13–11, 14–15
Pts: Garcia 18; Rebs: Carrera 8 Asts: Pueyo 8		Pts: Hipp 21; Rebs: Kurach 15; Asts: Hipp,

CREPS Region Centre, Bourges
Referees: Jelena Tomic (CRO), Aytug Ekti (TUR), Bert van Slooten (NED)

August 5
20:45

Boxscore

Russia	104–58	Lithuania
Scoring by quarter: 23–23, 21–15, 31–9, 29–11
Pts: Kuznetsova 20; Rebs: Kuznetsova 8 Asts: Bobrik 8		Pts: Visockaite 11; Rebs: Visockaite 7 Asts: Sinickaite, Savostaite 3

CREPS Region Centre, Bourges
Referees: Juris Kokainis (LAT), Csaba Cziffra (HUN), Jelena Smiljanic (SRB)

August 6
20:45

Boxscore

Poland	68–65	Lithuania
Scoring by quarter: 19–16, 14-19, 17–16, 18–14
Pts: W. Hipp 20; Rebs: M. Kowalska 9 Asts: W. Kuczynska 5		Pts: B. Sinickaite 19; Rebs: S. Visockaite 15; Asts: G. Savostaite 5

CREPS Region Centre, Bourges
Referees: Sonia TEIXEIRA (POR), Alin FAUR (ROU), Alexandru OLARU (ROU)

August 6
20:45

Boxscore

Spain	57–44	Russia
Scoring by quarter: 17–16, 10–16, 20–9, 10–13
Pts: R. Carrera 17; Rebs: R. Carrera 14; Asts: H. Pueyo 5		Pts: V. Pavliuchenko 10; Rebs: A. Rybina 8 Asts: A. Bobrik 3

Palais des Sports du Prado, Bourges
Referees: Yohan ROSSO (FRA), Juris KOKAINIS (LAT), Özlem Yalman (TUR)

=== Group B ===
Pos	Team	Pld	W	L	PF	PA	PD	Pts
1	Germany	3	3	0	157	94	+63	6
2	Czech Republic	3	1	2	135	118	+17	4 (Note: CRO 78–72 CZE)
3	Croatia	3	1	2	118	150	−32	4
4	Netherlands	3	1	2	94	142	−48	4

Source: FIBA
Notes:

August 4
14:00

Boxscore

Netherlands	54–79	Germany
Scoring by quarter: 14–17, 16–25, 16–17, 8–20
Pts: Van La Parra 13; Rebs: Huijbens 6 Asts: Van La Parra 3		Pts: Rosemeyer 15; Rebs: Reichert 9 Asts: Bessoir 5

CREPS Region Centre, Bourges
Referees: Sonia Teixeira (POR), Sarah Carey (AUS), Aytug Ekti (TUR)

August 4
16:15

Boxscore

Croatia	78–72	Czech Republic
Scoring by quarter: 19–21, 20–11, 17–15, 22–25
Pts: Mühl 18; Rebs: Curic 10; Asts: Mühl 7		Pts: Zeithammerova, Halatkova 13; Rebs: Semgady 11; Asts: Ondrouskova 5

CREPS Region Centre, Bourges
Referees: Anna Cardus (ESP), Samira Barrima (POR), Yury Ihnatsyeu (BLR)

August 5
14:00

Boxscore

Germany	78–40	Croatia
Scoring by quarter: 20–8, 21–19, 15–5, 22–8
Pts: Mayer, Landwehr 14; Rebs: Bessoir 9 Asts: Rosemeyer 6		Pts: Bilic 8 Rebs: Mandic 8 Asts: Mühl 2

Palais des Sports du Prado, Bourges
Referees: Alin Faur (ROU), Mindaugas Vecerskis (LTU), Kate Webb (ENG)

August 5
20:45

Boxscore

Czech Republic	63–40	Netherlands
Scoring by quarter: 15–12, 17–6, 19–13, 12–9
Pts: Halova 13; Rebs: Semgady 8 Asts: Semgady 4		Pts: Van La Parra 9 Rebs: Blagrove 6 Asts: Kopra 2

Palais des Sports du Prado, Bourges
Referees: Ivan Milicevic (BIH), Milosav Kaludjerovic (MNE), Özlem Yalman (TUR)

August 6
16:15

Boxscore

Netherlands	55–51	Croatia
Scoring by quarter: 13–13, 11–16, 18–9, 13–13
Pts: L. Sant 17; Rebs: C. Van La Parra 7 Asts: J. Blagrove 3		Pts: N. Muhl 15; Rebs: A. Mandic 16; Asts: N. Muhl 9

CREPS Region Centre, Bourges
Referees: Antonis DEMETRIOU (CYP), Jonas BILLE (DEN), Yury IHNATSYEU (BLR)

August 6
18:30

Boxscore

Czech Republic	46–68	Germany
Scoring by quarter: 7–24, 11–11, 14–19, 14–14
Pts: A. Ondrouskova 11; Rebs: T. Halatkova 6 Asts: S. Fiserova 2		Pts: E. Bessoir 18; Rebs: E. Bessoir 21; Asts: J. Forner 5

CREPS Region Centre, Bourges
Referees: Anna CARDUS (ESP), Csaba CZIFFRA (HUN), Aytug EKTI (TUR)

=== Group C ===
Pos	Team	Pld	W	L	PF	PA	PD	Pts
1	Hungary	3	3	0	162	86	+76	6
2	Italy	3	2	1	156	85	+71	5
3	Serbia	3	1	2	97	144	−47	4
4	Romania	3	0	3	74	174	−100	3

Source: FIBA

August 4
14:00

Boxscore

Romania	40–87	Hungary
Scoring by quarter: 17–19, 10–19, 8–22, 5–27
Pts: Rusu 10; Rebs: Martonos, Vaida 6 Asts: Martonos, Vaida 2		Pts: Szirony 15; Rebs: Manyoky 6 Asts: Angyal, Varga 5

CREPS Region Centre, Bourges
Referees: Juris Kokainis (LAT), David Berekashvili (GEO), Jelena Tomic (CRO)

August 4
20:45

Boxscore

Serbia	51–69	Italy
Scoring by quarter: 10–12, 10–17, 20–24, 11–16
Pts: Ristic 15; Rebs: Stefanovic 10; Asts: Smailbegovic 4		Pts: Orsili 13; Rebs: Pastrello 7 Asts: Panzera 6

Palais des Sports du Prado, Bourges
Referees: Elena Chernova (RUS), Michal Proc (POL), Bert van Slooten (NED)

August 5
16:15

Boxscore

Hungary	75–46	Serbia
Scoring by quarter: 20–12, 26–7, 15–16, 14–11
Pts: Dombai 15; Rebs: Varga 7 Asts: Angyal, Varga, Wentzel 4		Pts: Mitrovic 10; Rebs: Muzevic 8 Asts: Deuric 4

CREPS Region Centre, Bourges
Referees: Yohan Rosso (FRA), Yury Ihnatsyeu (BLR), Sonia Teixeira (POR)

August 5
18:30

Boxscore

Italy	87–34	Romania
Scoring by quarter: 23–7, 22–11, 23–8, 19–8
Pts: Gilli 13; Rebs: Gilli 6 Asts: Orsili, Natali 5		Pts: Catinean 13; Rebs: Vaida 7 Asts: Vaida, Glisici 2

CREPS Region Centre, Bourges
Referees: Antonis Demetriou (CYP), Jonas Bille (DEN), Anna Cardus (ESP)

August 6
14:00

Boxscore

Italy	49–55	Hungary
Scoring by quarter: 14–7, 10–14, 14–11, 11–23
Pts: C. Gilli 9 Rebs: M. Spinelli 12; Asts: I. Panzera 5		Pts: B. Angyal 14; Rebs: A. Varga 10; Asts: R. Manyoky 5

Palais des Sports du Prado, Bourges
Referees: Mindaugas VECERSKIS (LTU), Sarah CAREY (AUS), Michal PROC (POL)

August 6
16:15

Boxscore

Romania	45–82	Serbia
Scoring by quarter: 13–21, 12–22, 12–20, 8–19
Pts: A. Pop 13; Rebs: M. Martonos 7 Asts: S. Catinean 4		Pts: N. Nedeljkov 15; Rebs: V. Stefanovic 16; Asts: T. Corto 5

Palais des Sports du Prado, Bourges
Referees: Jelena TOMIC (CRO), Samira BARRIMA (POR), David BEREKASHVILI (GEO)

=== Group D ===
Pos	Team	Pld	W	L	PF	PA	PD	Pts
1	France	3	3	0	145	77	+68	6
2	Latvia	3	2	1	139	106	+33	5
3	Turkey	3	1	2	106	142	−36	4
4	Belarus	3	0	3	77	142	−65	3

Source: FIBA

August 4
18:30

Boxscore

Turkey	52–70	France
Scoring by quarter: 14–20, 16–20, 11–18, 11–12
Pts: Fitik 13; Rebs: Bayram 7 Asts: Ozen 3		Pts: Wadoux 18; Rebs: Rupert 8 Asts: Pardon, Chery 3

Palais des Sports du Prado, Bourges
Referees: Mindaugas Vecerskis (LTU), Jonas Bille (DEN), Ivan Milicevic (BIH)

August 4
20:45

Boxscore

Belarus	52–67	Latvia
Scoring by quarter: 6–18, 13–15, 27–11, 6–23
Pts: Siamiletnikava 13; Rebs: Sinelshchykova 9 Asts: Vasilevich 3		Pts: Meldere 18; Rebs: Vinerte 9 Asts: Nulle 4

CREPS Region Centre, Bourges
Referees: Jelena Smiljanic (SRB), Csaba Cziffra (HUN), Kate Webb (ENG)

August 5
16:15

Boxscore

Latvia	72–54	Turkey
Scoring by quarter: 17–18, 11–14, 25–10, 19–12
Pts: Baltace 13; Rebs: Meldere 18; Asts: Klescova 5		Pts: Fitik 17; Rebs: Bayram 11; Asts: Ozen 2

Palais des Sports du Prado, Bourges
Referees: Michal Proc (POL), Samira Barrima (POR), Sarah Carey (AUS)

August 5
18:30

Boxscore

France	75–25	Belarus
Scoring by quarter: 23–6, 18–3, 11–8, 23–8
Pts: Wadoux, Hoard 11; Rebs: Rupert 12; Asts: Benedetti 3		Pts: Venskaya 8 Rebs: Hryhoryeva 6 Asts: Vasilevich, Krauchanka 1

Palais des Sports du Prado, Bourges
Referees: Elena Chernova (RUS), David Berekashvili (GEO), Alexandru Olaru (ROU)

August 6
14:00

Boxscore

Belarus	59–75	Turkey
Scoring by quarter: 18–26, 13–14, 15–17, 13–18
Pts: Y. Vasilevich 14; Rebs: Y. Vasilevich 7 Asts: A. Isayenka 4		Pts: E. Bayram 19; Rebs: E. Bayram 18; Asts: D. Erdogan 3

CREPS Region Centre, Bourges
Referees: Jelena SMILJANIC (SRB), Milosav KALUDJEROVIC (MNE), Bert VAN SLOOTEN (NED)

August 6
18:30

Boxscore

France	68–45	Latvia
Scoring by quarter: 22–16, 16–9, 23–7, 7–13
Pts: K. Chery 25; Rebs: K. Chery 7 Asts: M. Pardon 4		Pts: R. Korenika 9 Rebs: P. Klescova 8 Asts: P. Klescova 3

CREPS Region Centre, Bourges
Referees: Elena CHERNOVA (RUS), Ivan MILICEVIC (BIH), Kate WEBB (ENG)

== Knockout stage ==
=== Bracket ===
Round of 16
8 August
Spain	68
Netherlands	30
8 August
Italy	70
Turkey	66
8 August
Czech Republic	50
Poland	57
8 August
France	68
Romania	25
8 August
Russia	76
Croatia	66
8 August
Hungary	64
Belarus	41
8 August
Germany	73
Lithuania	47
8 August
Latvia	61
Serbia	47

Quarter-finals
9 August
Spain	49
Italy	50
9 August
Poland	42
France	76
9 August
Russia	56
Hungary	62
9 August
Germany	58
Latvia	62

Semi-finals
11 August
Italy	57
France	74
11 August
Hungary	63
Latvia	45

Final
12 August
France	63
Hungary	55
3rd place game
12 August
Italy	48
Latvia	42

5th–8th place bracket

5th–8th place semifinals
11 August
Spain	79
Poland	61
11 August
Russia	52
Germany	53

5th place game
12 August
Spain	54
Germany	49
7th place game
12 August
Poland	70
Russia	85

=== 9th–16th place bracket ===
9th–16th place quarterfinals
9 August
Netherlands	66
Turkey	74
9 August
Czech Republic	70
Romania	28
9 August
Croatia	61
Belarus	43
9 August
Lithuania	42
Serbia	71

9th–12th place semifinals
11 August
Turkey	61
Czech Republic	66
11 August
Croatia	59
Serbia	57

9th place game
12 August
Czech Republic	65
Croatia	49
11th place game
12 August
Turkey	74
Serbia	57

13th–16th place bracket

13th–16th place semifinals
11 August
Netherlands	69
Romania	57
11 August
Belarus	62
Lithuania	66

13th place game
12 August
Netherlands	67
Lithuania	59
15th place game
12 August
Romania	33
Belarus	57

== Final standings ==
Rank	Team	Record
1st place, gold medalist(s)	France	7-0
2nd place, silver medalist(s)	Hungary	6-1
3rd place, bronze medalist(s)	Italy	5-2
4	Latvia	4-3
5	Spain	6-1
6	Germany	5-2
7	Russia	4-3
8	Poland	2-5
9	Czech Republic	4-3
10	Croatia	3-4
11	Turkey	3-4
12	Serbia	2-5
13	Netherlands	3–4
14	Lithuania	1–6
15	Belarus	1–6
16	Romania	0–7

Qualified for the 2018 FIBA Under-17 Women's Basketball World Cup
Qualified as the host nation for the 2018 FIBA Under-17 Women's Basketball World Cup and relegated to the 2018 FIBA U16 Women's European Championship Division B
Relegated to the 2018 FIBA U16 Women's European Championship Division B
