= 2014 FIBA Europe Under-16 Championship for Women =

2014 FIBA U16 Women's European Championship
26th FIBA Under-16 Women's European Basketball Championship

Tournament details
- Host country: Hungary
- Dates: 31 July – 10 August 2014
- Teams: 16
- Venues: 2 (in 1 host city)

Final positions
- Champions: Russia (5th title)

Official website
- www.fibaeurope.com

The 2014 FIBA Europe Under-16 Championship for Women was the 26th edition of the FIBA Europe Under-16 Championship for Women. 16 teams featured in the competition, held in Debrecen, Hungary, from 31 July to 10 August 2014.

== Participating teams ==
- Belgium
- Croatia
- Czech Republic
- Denmark ▲ (3rd place, 2013 FIBA Europe Under-16 Championship for Women Division B)
- Greece
- France
- Hungary
- Italy
- Latvia
- Portugal ▲ (Runners-up, 2013 FIBA Europe Under-16 Championship for Women Division B)
- Russia
- Serbia ▲ (Winners, 2013 FIBA Europe Under-16 Championship for Women Division B)
- Slovakia
- Spain
- Sweden
- Turkey

== First round ==
The first-round groups draw took place on 1 December 2013 in Freising, Germany. In the first round, the sixteen teams were allocated in four groups of four teams each. The top three teams of each group will qualify for the Second Round. The last team of each group will play in the Classification Group G first, then in the 9th – 16th place playoffs.

Team advances to the Second Round
Team will compete in the Classification Group G

=== Group A ===
Team	Pld	W	L	PF	PA	PD	Pts
Russia	3	3	0	231	134	+97	6
Turkey	3	2	1	175	187	−12	5
Greece	3	1	2	159	171	−12	4
Portugal	3	0	3	139	212	−73	3

31 July 2014

Turkey	39–90	Russia

31 July 2014

Portugal	48–58	Greece

1 August 2014

Greece	58–65	Turkey

1 August 2014

Russia	83–52	Portugal

2 August 2014

Turkey	71–39	Portugal

2 August 2014

Greece	43–58	Russia

=== Group B ===
Team	Pld	W	L	PF	PA	PD	Pts
Hungary	3	3	0	162	141	+21	6
Spain	3	2	1	208	180	+28	5
Croatia	3	1	2	174	203	−29	4
Serbia	3	0	3	149	169	−20	3

31 July 2014

Croatia	60–89	Spain

31 July 2014

Serbia	33–44	Hungary

1 August 2014

Spain	63–57	Serbia

1 August 2014

Hungary	55–52	Croatia

2 August 2014

Croatia	62–59	Serbia

2 August 2014

Hungary	63–56	Spain

=== Group C ===
Team	Pld	W	L	PF	PA	PD	Pts
Czech Republic	3	3	0	227	135	+92	6
Italy	3	2	1	200	147	+53	5
Sweden	3	1	2	136	183	−47	4
Denmark	3	0	3	128	226	−98	3

31 July 2014

Sweden	41–65	Italy

31 July 2014

Denmark	45–86	Czech Republic

1 August 2014

Italy	88–42	Denmark

1 August 2014

Czech Republic	77–43	Sweden

2 August 2014

Sweden	52–41	Denmark

2 August 2014

Czech Republic	64–47	Italy

=== Group D ===
Team	Pld	W	L	PF	PA	PD	Pts
Latvia	3	2	1	186	171	+15	5
France	3	2	1	166	156	+10	5
Belgium	3	1	2	152	157	−5	4
Slovakia	3	1	2	157	177	−20	4

31 July 2014

Slovakia	53–57	France

31 July 2014

Latvia	63–52	Belgium

1 August 2014

France	61–66	Latvia

1 August 2014

Belgium	63–46	Slovakia

2 August 2014

Slovakia	58–57	Latvia

2 August 2014

Belgium	37–48	France

== Second round ==
Twelve advancing teams from the First Round are allocated in two groups of six teams each. The top four teams of each group will advance to the quarterfinals. The last two teams of each group will play in the 9th – 16th place playoffs against the teams from the Group G.

Team advances to the Quarterfinals
Team will compete in the 9th – 16th place playoffs

=== Group E ===
Team	Pld	W	L	PF	PA	PD	Pts
Russia	5	5	0	390	210	+180	10
Hungary	5	4	1	266	267	−1	9
Spain	5	3	2	360	288	+72	8
Turkey	5	2	3	261	329	−68	7
Croatia	5	1	4	260	303	−43	6
Greece	5	0	5	185	325	−140	5

4 August 2014

Croatia	37–73	Russia

4 August 2014

Spain	76–47	Turkey

4 August 2014

Greece	23–58	Hungary

5 August 2014

Russia	82–54	Spain

5 August 2014

Turkey	49–53	Hungary

5 August 2014

Croatia	59–25	Greece

6 August 2014

Hungary	37–87	Russia

6 August 2014

Spain	85–36	Greece

6 August 2014

Turkey	61–52	Croatia

=== Group F ===
Team	Pld	W	L	PF	PA	PD	Pts
Czech Republic	5	5	0	322	235	+87	10
Latvia	5	3	2	314	308	+6	8
France	5	3	2	258	234	+24	8
Belgium	5	2	3	233	240	−7	7
Italy	5	2	3	266	256	+10	7
Sweden	5	0	5	204	324	−120	5

4 August 2014

Belgium	40–51	Czech Republic

4 August 2014

France	47–36	Italy

4 August 2014

Sweden	42–66	Latvia

5 August 2014

Belgium	60–36	Sweden

5 August 2014

Czech Republic	53–46	France

5 August 2014

Italy	76–60	Latvia

6 August 2014

Latvia	59–77	Czech Republic

6 August 2014

Italy	42–44	Belgium

6 August 2014

France	56–42	Sweden

== Classification Group G ==
The last team of each group of the First Round will compete in this classification round.

Team	Pld	W	L	PF	PA	PD	Pts
Serbia	3	3	0	191	143	+48	6
Slovakia	3	2	1	205	198	+7	5
Portugal	3	1	2	159	158	+1	4
Denmark	3	0	3	148	204	−56	3

4 August 2014

Portugal	62–65	Slovakia

4 August 2014

Serbia	68–42	Denmark

5 August 2014

Slovakia	69–73	Serbia

5 August 2014

Denmark	43–65	Portugal

6 August 2014

Portugal	32–50	Serbia

6 August 2014

Denmark	63–71	Slovakia

== 9th – 16th place playoffs ==
8 August 2014

Italy	93–26	Denmark

8 August 2014

Croatia	75–41	Portugal

8 August 2014

Sweden	42–57	Slovakia

8 August 2014

Greece	43–52	Serbia

=== Classification games for 13th – 16th place ===
9 August 2014

Portugal	65–57	Sweden

9 August 2014

Denmark	52–68	Greece

=== Classification games for 9th – 12th place ===
9 August 2014

Croatia	58–50	Slovakia

9 August 2014

Italy	64–60	Serbia

== 1st – 8th place playoffs ==
=== Quarterfinals ===
8 August 2014

Russia	75–29	Belgium

8 August 2014

Czech Republic	70–55	Turkey

8 August 2014

Hungary	50–52	France

8 August 2014

Latvia	45–79	Spain

==== Classification games for 5th – 8th place ====
9 August 2014

Belgium	57–63	Latvia

9 August 2014

Turkey	50–63	Hungary

=== Semifinals ===
9 August 2014

Russia	77–65	Spain

9 August 2014

Czech Republic	62–49	France

== Final classification games ==
=== Match for 15th place ===
10 August 2014

Denmark	60–36	Sweden

=== Match for 13th place ===
10 August 2014

Greece	38–53	Portugal

=== Match for 11th place ===
10 August 2014

Serbia	65–63	Slovakia

=== Match for 9th place ===
10 August 2014

Italy	60–39	Croatia

=== Match for 7th place ===
10 August 2014

Belgium	72–67	Turkey

=== Match for 5th place ===
10 August 2014

Latvia	62–56	Hungary

=== Bronze medal match ===
10 August 2014

Spain	61–49	France

=== Final ===
10 August 2014

Russia	72–47	Czech Republic

Debrecen
Attendance: 1400
Referees: Miguel Angel Perez Niz (ESP), Eric Bertrand (SUI), Jelena Tomic (CRO)

== Final standings ==
Rank	Team
1st place, gold medalist(s)	Russia
2nd place, silver medalist(s)	Czech Republic
3rd place, bronze medalist(s)	Spain
4th	France
5th	Latvia
6th	Hungary
7th	Belgium
8th	Turkey
9th	Italy
10th	Croatia
11th	Serbia
12th	Slovakia
13th	Portugal
14th	Greece
15th	Denmark
16th	Sweden

2014 FIBA Europe Women's Under-16 Championship winners

Russia
5th title

Relegated to the 2015 FIBA Europe Under-16 Championship for Women Division B
