= FIBA U16 Women's EuroBasket =

International girls' basketball tournament

- Most recent season or competition: 2026 FIBA U16 Women's EuroBasket
- Sport: Basketball
- Founded: 1976
- Organizing body: FIBA Europe
- Divisions: 3
- No. of teams: 16 (Division A)
- Continent: Europe
- Most recent champion: Spain (12th title)
- Most titles: Spain (12 titles)
- Related competitions: FIBA U18 Women's EuroBasket; FIBA U20 Women's EuroBasket
- Website: www.fiba.basketball/history

The FIBA U16 Women's EuroBasket, formerly the FIBA U16 Women's European Championship, and originally the FIBA European Championship for Cadettes, is an annual youth basketball competition contested by under-16 women's national teams from FIBA Europe.

The inaugural tournament was in 1976 and was held biennially until 2003. Since 2004, the competition has been played every year. In odd numbered years, the tournament also serves as the European qualification path for the FIBA Under-17 Women's Basketball World Cup.

The current champions are Spain, having beaten Slovenia in the 2026 final.

== Division A ==
=== Results ===
Year	Host	Gold medal game			Bronze medal game		
Year	Host	Gold	Score	Silver	Bronze	Score	Fourth place
1976	Poland (Szczecin)	Soviet Union	Round-robin group	Hungary	Bulgaria	Round-robin group	Czechoslovakia
1978	Spain (Cuenca)	Soviet Union	77–62	Italy	Bulgaria	107–84	Romania
1980	Hungary (Zalaegerszeg & Pécs)	Soviet Union	Round-robin group	Italy	Bulgaria	Round-robin group	Romania
1982	Finland (Forssa & Uusikaupunki)	Soviet Union	66–65	Yugoslavia	Italy	70–68	Bulgaria
1984	Italy (Perugia & Marsciano)	Soviet Union	72–67	Bulgaria	Italy	69–66	Netherlands
1985	Yugoslavia (Tuzla)	Soviet Union	78–55	Italy	Yugoslavia	53–50	Hungary
1987	Poland (Gorzów Wielkopolski)	Soviet Union	83–58	Czechoslovakia	Yugoslavia	89–72	Bulgaria
1989	Romania (Timișoara)	Czechoslovakia	58–57	Romania	Soviet Union	95–66	Spain
1991	Portugal (Estarreja, Travassô & Anadia)	Soviet Union	84–75	Yugoslavia	Italy	79–72	Hungary
1993	Slovakia (Poprad)	Russia	66–65	Spain	Italy	65–60	Slovakia
1995	Poland (Władysławowo)	Russia	104–68	Italy	Belgium	75–70	Spain
1997	Hungary (Sopron)	Russia	69–60	Czech Republic	France	66–62	Belarus
1999	Romania (Tulcea)	Spain	66–58	FR Yugoslavia	France	57–50	Russia
2001	Bulgaria (Veliko Tarnovo)	France	68–66	Russia	Croatia	80–67	Czech Republic
2003	Turkey (Nevşehir)	Serbia and Montenegro	73–61	Belarus	Ukraine	89–67	Spain
2004	Italy (Asti, Biella, Novara & Cuneo)	Spain	58–52	Serbia and Montenegro	Russia	74–57	Belarus
2005	Poland (Poznań)	Spain	74–65	France	Poland	60–55	Turkey
2006	Slovakia (Košice)	Spain	80–78	Czech Republic	Lithuania	84–72	Serbia and Montenegro
2007	Latvia (Valmiera)	France	60–57	Spain	Czech Republic	65–62	Serbia
2008	Poland (Katowice)	Spain	71–59	Italy	France	73–44	Sweden
2009	Italy (Naples)	Spain	57–53	Belgium	France	75–46	Russia
2010	Greece (Kozani, Ptolemaida)	Russia	71–53	Croatia	France	50–44	Serbia
2011	Italy (Cagliari)	Spain	67–43	Belgium	Italy	82–48	Turkey
2012	Hungary (Miskolc)	Spain	70–49	Italy	Russia	53–41	Belgium
2013	Bulgaria (Varna)	Spain	54–49	Czech Republic	Hungary	62–55	Italy
2014	Hungary (Debrecen)	Russia	72–47	Czech Republic	Spain	61–49	France
2015	Portugal (Matosinhos)	Czech Republic	79–55	Portugal	Italy	70–54	Spain
2016	Italy (Udine)	Spain	64–48	Germany	France	68–50	Italy
2017	France (Bourges)	France	63–55	Hungary	Italy	48–42	Latvia
2018	Lithuania (Kaunas)	Italy	60–52	Czech Republic	Spain	64–47	Turkey
2019	North Macedonia (Skopje)	Russia	73–66	Lithuania	Spain	72–57	France
2020	Portugal	Cancelled due to COVID-19 pandemic in Portugal					
2021	Portugal	Cancelled due to COVID-19 pandemic in Europe. The 2021 FIBA U16 Women's European Challengers were played instead.					
2022	Portugal (Matosinhos)	France	65–61	Spain	Croatia	72–58	Portugal
2023	Turkey (İzmir)	France	67–63	Spain	Italy	59–58	Finland
2024	Hungary (Miskolc)	Finland	49–47	France	Spain	80–38	Italy
2025	Romania (Pitești)	Spain	62–47	Slovenia	Germany	71–66	Latvia
2026	Romania (Pitești & Mioveni)	Spain	87–40	Slovenia	France	78–58	Latvia
2027	Bulgaria (Samokov)		–			–	

=== Medal table ===
- Defunct countries in italics

Rank	Nation	Gold	Silver	Bronze	Total
1	Spain	12	4	4	20
2	Soviet Union	8	0	1	9
3	Russia	6	1	2	9
4	France	5	2	7	14
5	Italy	1	6	8	15
6	Czech Republic	1	5	1	7
7	Serbia and Montenegro	1	2	0	3
8	Czechoslovakia	1	1	0	2
9	Finland	1	0	0	1
10	Yugoslavia	0	2	2	4
11	Belgium	0	2	1	3
11	Hungary	0	2	1	3
13	Slovenia	0	2	0	2
14	Bulgaria	0	1	3	4
15	Croatia	0	1	2	3
16	Germany	0	1	1	2
16	Lithuania	0	1	1	2
18	Belarus	0	1	0	1
18	Portugal	0	1	0	1
18	Romania	0	1	0	1
21	Poland	0	0	1	1
21	Ukraine	0	0	1	1
Totals (22 entries)		36	36	36	108

=== Participation details ===
==== Tournaments 1976–1991 ====
Team	(Poland) 1976	(Spain) 1978	(Hungary) 1980	(Finland) 1982	(Italy) 1984	(Socialist Federal Republic of Yugoslavia) 1985	(Poland) 1987	(Romania) 1989	(Portugal) 1991
Austria					12th				
Belgium	13th	10th			10th	10th			
Bulgaria	3rd	3rd	3rd	4th	2nd	6th	4th		
Czechoslovakia †	4t		5th				2nd	1st	6th
Finland	12th	8th		5th		12th	8th		
France		7th	9th	7th	9th	8th	6th	8th	8th
West Germany		12th	12th	9th	11th	11th	11th	6th	
Greece								9th	5th
Hungary	2nd		6th	6th	6th	4th	10th	11th	4th
Israel	11th	13th		12th					
Italy	9th	2nd	2nd	3rd	3rd	2nd	7th	5th	3rd
Netherlands	6th	9th		10th	4th	7th		12th	10th
Poland	5th	5th	8th				12th	10th	7th
Portugal									12th
Romania	8th	4th	4th		5th	5th	5th	2nd	11th
Scotland	14th	14th							
Soviet Union †	1st	1st	1st	1st	1st	1st	1st	3rd	1st
Spain	10th	11th	10th	8th	7th	9th	9th	4th	9th
Sweden	15th		11th	11th					
Switzerland	16th								
Tunisia		15th							
Yugoslavia †	7th	6th	7th	2nd	8th	3rd	3rd	7th	2nd
Team	(Poland) 1976	(Spain) 1978	(Hungary) 1980	(Finland) 1982	(Italy) 1984	(Socialist Federal Republic of Yugoslavia) 1985	(Poland) 1987	(Romania) 1989	(Portugal) 1991

==== Tournaments 1993–2013 ====
Team	(Slovakia) 1993	(Poland) 1995	(Hungary) 1997	(Romania) 1999	(Bulgaria) 2001	(Turkey) 2003	(Italy) 2004	(Poland) 2005	(Slovakia) 2006	(Latvia) 2007	(Poland) 2008	(Italy) 2009	(Greece) 2010	(Italy) 2011	(Hungary) 2012	(Bulgaria) 2013
Belarus		5th	4th	8th		2nd	4th	12th	7th	9th	10th	14th	15th			
Belgium	8th	3rd	10th				13th	14th	13th	12th	5th	2nd	8th	2nd	4th	13th
Bulgaria		6th			12th		11th	16th								16th
Croatia	12th		6th	9th	3rd	8th	9th	10th	16th				2nd	14th	9th	8th
Czech Republic		8th	2nd	11th	4th	7th	6th	7th	2nd	3rd	11th	8th	9th	10th	6th	2nd
England															16th	
Estonia									15th							
Finland	10th											9th	12th	16th		
France	6th		3rd	3rd	1st	5th	7th	2nd	5th	1st	3rd	3rd	3rd	7th	5th	5th
Germany		9th				9th	16th				13th	16th			15th	
Greece	7th	7th		7th	11th	12th	14th	13th	14th	15th		7th	10th	5th	10th	11th
Hungary	5th		8th		9th		10th	11th	12th	10th	7th	15th		12th	7th	3rd
Italy	3rd	2nd	11th		8th	10th	5th	15th			2nd	6th	13th	3rd	2nd	4th
Latvia	11th				5th					7th	15th					7th
Lithuania	9th							9th	3rd	13th	12th	12th	16th			15th
Netherlands													7th	9th	12th	14th
Poland		11th	9th	6th			12th	3rd	6th		6th	10th	14th	15th		
Romania			12th	12th												
Russia	1st	1st	1st	4th	2nd	6th	3rd	5th	9th	6th	9th	4th	1st	6th	3rd	6th
Serbia			played as part of (Serbia and Montenegro)							4th	14th	11th	4th	13th	14th	
Serbia and Montenegro †^{A}			7th	2nd	10th	1st	2nd	8th	4th	defunct						
Slovakia	4th	10th		5th	6th		15th		10th	16th				11th	8th	10th
Slovenia		12th														
Spain	2nd	4th	5th	1st	7th	4th	1st	1st	1st	2nd	1st	1st	5th	1st	1st	1st
Sweden										5th	4th	13th	11th	8th	11th	9th
Turkey				10th		11th	8th	4th	11th	14th	8th	5th	6th	4th	13th	12th
Ukraine						3rd		6th	8th	11th	16th					
Team	(Slovakia) 1993	(Poland) 1995	(Hungary) 1997	(Romania) 1999	(Bulgaria) 2001	(Turkey) 2003	(Italy) 2004	(Poland) 2005	(Slovakia) 2006	(Latvia) 2007	(Poland) 2008	(Italy) 2009	(Greece) 2010	(Italy) 2011	(Hungary) 2012	(Bulgaria) 2013
Austria	playing in lower divisions															
Switzerland	playing in lower divisions															
Scotland	playing in lower divisions															
Czechoslovakia †	defunct; succeeded by Czech Republic and Slovakia															
Soviet Union †	defunct															
Tunisia	playing in FIBA Africa															
Yugoslavia †	defunct															

==== Tournaments 2014–present ====
Team	(Hungary) 2014	(Portugal) 2015	(Italy) 2016	(France) 2017	(Lithuania) 2018	(North Macedonia) 2019	(Portugal) 2022	(Turkey) 2023	(Hungary) 2024	(Romania) 2025	(Romania) 2026	2027	Total
Belarus			8th	15th									13
Belgium	7th	14th			13th	6th	7th	9th	5th	15th			24
Bulgaria											16th		13
Croatia	10th	12th	5th	10th	14th		3rd	5th	13th	12th	12th		22
Czech Republic	2nd	1st	7th	9th	2nd	7th	12th	14th		13th	10th		25
Denmark	15th				12th	13th	16th						4
England		16th		Great Britain									2
Finland						10th	13th	4th	1st	16th			14
France	4th	6th	3rd	1st	5th	4th	1st	1st	2nd	7th	3rd		34
Germany		9th	2nd	6th	10th	9th	14th		7th	3rd	8th		22
Great Britain	ENG/SCO/WAL									14th			1
Greece	14th					12th	6th	13th	15th				21
Hungary	6th	7th	12th	2nd	7th	11th	5th	8th	8th	10th	5th		31
Israel								12th	12th	11th	13th		7
Italy	9th	3rd	4th	3rd	1st	5th	8th	3rd	4th	6th	14th		33
Latvia	5th	5th	10th	4th	9th	8th	9th	11th	9th	4th	4th		16
Lithuania			6th	14th	11th	2nd	15th				11th		14
Netherlands		15th		13th	16th								14
Montenegro									14th				1
Poland				8th	8th	14th	10th	6th	11th	8th	9th		24
Portugal	13th	2nd	14th				4th	16th					6
Romania				16th						9th	15th		13
Russia	1st	8th	11th	7th	6th	1st							22
Serbia	11th	10th	13th	12th	15th			7th	10th	5th	7th		15
Slovakia	12th	13th	16th										13
Slovenia							11th	10th	6th	2nd	2nd		6
Spain	3rd	4th	1st	5th	3rd	3rd	2nd	2nd	3rd	1st	1st		36
Sweden	16th		15th			16th			16th				14
Turkey	8th	11th	9th	11th	4th	15th		15th			6th		20
Team	(Hungary) 2014	(Portugal) 2015	(Italy) 2016	(France) 2017	(Lithuania) 2018	(North Macedonia) 2019	(Portugal) 2022	(Turkey) 2023	(Hungary) 2024	(Romania) 2025	(Romania) 2026	2027	Total
Austria	playing in lower divisions												1
Estonia	playing in lower divisions												1
Switzerland	playing in lower divisions												1
Ukraine	playing in lower divisions												5
Scotland	playing in LD			Great Britain									2
Czechoslovakia †	defunct; succeeded by Czech Republic and Slovakia												5
Serbia and Montenegro †^{A}	defunct												7
Soviet Union †	defunct												9
Tunisia	playing in FIBA Africa												1
Yugoslavia †	defunct												9

^{^A} As FR Yugoslavia (1997–2003, 4 participations, 2 medals) and as Serbia and Montenegro (2004–2006, 3 participations, 1 medal)

== Division B ==
=== Results ===
Year	Host	Promoted to Division A			Bronze medal game		
Year	Host	Gold	Score	Silver	Bronze *	Score	Fourth place
2004 details	Bosnia and Herzegovina (Brčko); Estonia (Rakvere)	Ukraine (Gold; Group A)	N/A	Lithuania (Gold; Group B)	Bosnia and Herzegovina (Silver; Group A)	N/A	Iceland (Silver; Group B)
2005 details	Estonia (Tallinn)	Slovakia	85–55	Estonia	Germany	71–59	England
2006 details	Finland (Jyväskylä)	Sweden	72–62	Latvia	Romania	72–63	Italy
2007 details	Italy (Chieti)	Italy	64–55	Germany	Slovenia	66–61	Israel
2008 details	Bulgaria (Pravets)	Greece	56–47	Finland	Romania	70–56	Slovenia
2009 details	Estonia (Tallinn)	Netherlands	71–59	Croatia	Slovakia	77–50	Denmark
2010 details	Macedonia (Skopje)	Hungary	55–44	Slovakia	Portugal	78–52	England
2011 details	Romania (Arad)	Germany	66–63	England	Latvia	84–52	Bulgaria
2012 details	Estonia (Tallinn)	Lithuania	86–73	Bulgaria	Latvia	42–35	Portugal
2013 details	Portugal (Matosinhos)	Serbia	58–54	Portugal	Denmark	76–67	Finland
2014 details	Estonia (Tallinn)	Germany	68–54	England	Netherlands	54–44	Slovenia
2015 details	Macedonia (Ohrid & Struga)	Lithuania	80–74 (OT)	Belarus	Sweden	54–44	Slovenia
2016 details	Romania (Oradea)	Poland	66–52	Romania	Netherlands	50–44	Israel
2017 details	Macedonia (Skopje)	Denmark	74–73	Belgium	Greece (Note: Greece was not promoted due to Lithuania hosting the 2018 Division A tournament.)	53–36	Ukraine
2018 details	Montenegro (Podgorica)	Sweden	51-41	Greece	Finland	86-52	Belarus
2019 details	Bulgaria (Sofia)	Slovenia	71–56	Portugal	Croatia	49–45	Norway
2020	Bosnia and Herzegovina	Cancelled due to COVID-19 pandemic in Bosnia and Herzegovina					
2021	Bosnia and Herzegovina	Cancelled due to COVID-19 pandemic in Europe. The 2021 FIBA U16 Women's European Challengers were played instead.					
2022 details	Montenegro (Podgorica)	Serbia	84–66	Turkey	Israel	59–47	Sweden
2023 details	Montenegro (Podgorica)	Germany	65–57	Montenegro	Sweden	61–52	Estonia
2024 details	Turkey (Konya)	Romania	54–52	Czech Republic	Great Britain	84–62	Turkey
2025 details	Turkey (Istanbul)	Lithuania	77–60	Bulgaria	Turkey	54–46	Switzerland

* From 2012 to 2025, the third-placed team in Division B also promoted to Division A for the next tournament.

==== Format with three mini-tournaments ====
Year	Host	Winners		
Year	Host	Tournament 1	Tournament 2	Tournament 3
2026 details	Slovakia (Piešťany); Luxembourg (Bertrange); Greece (Ioannina)	Belgium	Portugal	Greece

=== Medal table until 2025 ===
Rank	Nation	Gold	Silver	Bronze	Total
1	Germany	3	1	1	5
2	Lithuania	3	1	0	4
3	Sweden	2	0	2	4
4	Serbia	2	0	0	2
5	Romania	1	1	2	4
6	Greece	1	1	1	3
6	Slovakia	1	1	1	3
8	Netherlands	1	0	2	3
9	Denmark	1	0	1	2
9	Slovenia	1	0	1	2
11	Hungary	1	0	0	1
11	Italy	1	0	0	1
11	Poland	1	0	0	1
11	Ukraine	1	0	0	1
15	Portugal	0	2	1	3
16	Bulgaria	0	2	0	2
16	England	0	2	0	2
18	Latvia	0	1	2	3
19	Croatia	0	1	1	2
19	Finland	0	1	1	2
19	Turkey	0	1	1	2
22	Belarus	0	1	0	1
22	Belgium	0	1	0	1
22	Czech Republic	0	1	0	1
22	Estonia	0	1	0	1
22	Montenegro	0	1	0	1
27	Bosnia and Herzegovina	0	0	1	1
27	Great Britain	0	0	1	1
27	Israel	0	0	1	1
Totals (29 entries)		20	20	20	60

== Division C ==
=== Results ===
Year	Host	Gold medal game			Bronze medal game		
Year	Host	Gold	Score	Silver	Bronze	Score	Fourth place
2000 details	Gibraltar	Cyprus	Round-robin group	Scotland	Andorra	Round-robin group	Iceland
2002 details	Malta	Luxembourg	Round-robin group	Iceland	Scotland	Round-robin group	Malta
2004 details	Andorra	Luxembourg	Round-robin group	Scotland	Andorra	Round-robin group	Gibraltar
2006 details	Luxembourg	Scotland	53–48	Luxembourg	Monaco	68–23	Gibraltar
2008 details	Monaco	Iceland	74–41	Albania	Scotland	68–49	Malta
2010 details	Andorra	Scotland	95–32	Monaco	Andorra	49–36	Cyprus
2011 details	Andorra	Andorra	61–49	Cyprus	Malta	49–45	Monaco
2012 details	Gibraltar	Iceland	57–44	Cyprus	Scotland	62–29	Gibraltar
2013 details	Gibraltar	Cyprus	Round-robin group	Scotland	Monaco	Round-robin group	Gibraltar
2014 details	Malta	Scotland	Round-robin group	Malta	Andorra	Round-robin group	Wales
2015 details	Andorra	Iceland	76–39	Armenia	Malta	53–35	Wales
2016 details	Andorra	Georgia	54–35	Andorra	Malta	61–28	Kosovo
2017 details	Gibraltar	Armenia	63–44	Malta	Georgia	66–45	Wales
2018 details	Moldova	Austria	69–48	Scotland	Georgia	51–50	Moldova
2019 details	Moldova	Cyprus	75–38	Georgia	Scotland	76–35	Moldova
2020	Gibraltar	Cancelled due to COVID-19 pandemic in Gibraltar					
2021	Gibraltar	Cancelled due to COVID-19 pandemic in Europe. The 2021 FIBA U16 Women's European Challengers were played instead.					
2022 details	Albania	Cyprus	58–42	Armenia	Malta	64–47	Andorra
2023 details	Andorra	Azerbaijan	57–45	Andorra	Georgia	51–46	Malta
2024 details	Gibraltar	Azerbaijan	69–52	Cyprus	Albania	43–41	Malta
2025 details	Kosovo	Cyprus	65–58	Armenia	Albania	61–57	Malta
2026 details	Malta	Malta	76–51	Albania	Georgia	73–49	Armenia

=== Medal table ===
Rank	Nation	Gold	Silver	Bronze	Total
1	Cyprus	5	3	0	8
2	Scotland	3	4	4	11
3	Iceland	3	1	0	4
4	Luxembourg	2	1	0	3
5	Azerbaijan	2	0	0	2
6	Armenia	1	3	0	4
7	Andorra	1	2	4	7
7	Malta	1	2	4	7
9	Georgia	1	1	4	6
10	Austria	1	0	0	1
11	Albania	0	2	2	4
12	Monaco	0	1	2	3
Totals (12 entries)		20	20	20	60

== Under-17 Women's World Cup record ==
Team	(France) 2010	(Netherlands) 2012	(Czech Republic) 2014	(Spain) 2016	(Belarus) 2018	(Hungary) 2022	(Mexico) 2024	(Czech Republic) 2026	(Indonesia) 2028	Total
Belarus	–	–	–	–	15th	–	–	–		1
Belgium	4th	7th	–	–	–	13th	–	–		3
Croatia	–	–	–	–	–	–	9th	–		1
Czech Republic	–	–	4th	5th	–	–	–	14th		3
Finland	–	–	–	–	–	–	8th	–		1
France	2nd	–	8th	8th	2nd	3rd	4th	–		6
Germany	–	–	–	–	–	7th	–	13th		2
Hungary	–	–	3rd	–	4th	6th	–	–		3
Italy	–	6th	13th	2nd	5th	–	7th	10th		5
Latvia	–	–	–	10th	8th	–	–	11th		3
Netherlands	–	8th	–	–	–	–	–	–		1
Russia	6th	–	–	–	–	DQ	–	–		1
Slovakia	–	–	15th	–	–	–	–	–		1
Slovenia	–	–	–	–	–	9th	–	8th		2
Spain	8th	2nd	2nd	6th	6th	2nd	3rd	2nd		8
Turkey	10th	12th	–	–	–	–	–	–		2
Total	4	4	6	6	6	6	5	6	5	

== See also ==
- FIBA U20 Women's EuroBasket
- FIBA U18 Women's EuroBasket
