= Soviet Union women's national under-16 basketball team =

Soviet Union
- FIBA zone: FIBA Europe
- National federation: Soviet Basketball Federation

U16 EuroBasket
- Appearances: 9
- Medals: Gold: 8 (1976, 1978, 1980, 1982, 1984, 1985, 1987, 1991); Bronze: 1 (1989)
Home	Away

The Soviet Union women's national under-16 basketball team was a national basketball team of the Soviet Union. It represented the country in international under-16 women's basketball competitions, until the dissolution of the Soviet Union in 1991. After 1992, the successor countries all set up their own national teams.

== FIBA U16 Women's EuroBasket record ==
Year	Pos.	Pld	W	L	Ref.
(Poland) 1976	1st place, gold medalist(s)	7	7	0	
(Spain) 1978	1st place, gold medalist(s)	9	9	0	
(Hungary) 1980	1st place, gold medalist(s)	8	8	0	
(Finland) 1982	1st place, gold medalist(s)	7	6	1	
(Italy) 1984	1st place, gold medalist(s)	7	6	1	
(Socialist Federal Republic of Yugoslavia) 1985	1st place, gold medalist(s)	7	7	0	
(Poland) 1987	1st place, gold medalist(s)	7	7	0	
(Romania) 1989	3rd place, bronze medalist(s)	7	6	1	
(Portugal) 1991	1st place, gold medalist(s)	7	6	1	
Total	9/9	66	62	4	

== See also ==
- Soviet Union women's national basketball team
- Soviet Union women's national under-19 basketball team
- Soviet Union men's national under-16 basketball team
- Russia women's national basketball team
- Russia women's national under-17 basketball team
