= Bulgaria women's national under-16 basketball team =

Bulgaria
- FIBA zone: FIBA Europe
- National federation: Bulgarian Basketball Federation

U17 World Cup
- Appearances: None

U16 EuroBasket
- Appearances: 13
- Medals: Silver: 1 (1984); Bronze: 3 (1976, 1978, 1980)

U16 EuroBasket Division B
- Appearances: 17
- Medals: Silver: 2 (2012, 2025)

The Bulgaria women's national under-16 basketball team is a national basketball team of Bulgaria, administered by the Bulgarian Basketball Federation. It represents the country in international under-16 women's basketball competitions.

== FIBA U16 Women's EuroBasket participations ==
Year	Division A	Division B
1976	3rd place, bronze medalist(s)	
1978	3rd place, bronze medalist(s)	
1980	3rd place, bronze medalist(s)	
1982	4th	
1984	2nd place, silver medalist(s)	
1985	6th	
1987	4th	
1995	6th	
2001	12th	
2004	11th	
2005	16th	
2006		7th
2007		13th
2008		8th
2009		17th

Year	Division A	Division B
2010		6th
2011		4th
2012		2nd place, silver medalist(s)
2013	16th	
2014		7th
2015		13th
2016		13th
2017		13th
2018		18th
2019		8th
2022		5th
2023		15th
2024		15th
2025		2nd place, silver medalist(s)
2026	16th	

== See also ==
- Bulgaria women's national basketball team
- Bulgaria women's national under-18 basketball team
- Bulgaria men's national under-17 basketball team
