= Belgium women's national under-16 and under-17 basketball team =

Belgium
- FIBA zone: FIBA Europe
- National federation: Basketball Belgium
- Coach: Philip Wolk

U17 World Cup
- Appearances: 3
- Medals: None

U16 EuroBasket
- Appearances: 25
- Medals: Silver: 2 (2009, 2011); Bronze: 1 (1995)

U16 EuroBasket Division B
- Appearances: 3
- Medals: Silver: 1 (2017) ▲ Prom.: 1 (2026)

The Belgium women's national under-16 and under-17 basketball team is a national basketball team of Belgium, administered by the Basketball Belgium. It represents the country in international under-16 and under-17 women's basketball competitions.

== FIBA U16 Women's EuroBasket participations ==
Year	Division A
1976	13th
1978	10th
1984	10th
1985	10th
1993	8th
1995	3rd place, bronze medalist(s)
1997	10th
2004	13th
2005	14th
2006	13th
2007	12th
2008	5th
2009	2nd place, silver medalist(s)
2010	8th

Year	Division A	Division B
2011	2nd place, silver medalist(s)	
2012	4th	
2013	13th	
2014	7th	
2015	14th	
2016		9th
2017		2nd place, silver medalist(s)
2018	13th	
2019	6th	
2022	7th	
2023	9th	
2024	5th	
2025	15th	
2026		Rank 1 trio

== FIBA Under-17 Women's Basketball World Cup record ==
Year	Pos.	Pld	W	L
(France) 2010	4th	8	5	3
(Netherlands) 2012	7th	8	3	5
(Czech Republic) 2014	Did not qualify			
(Spain) 2016	Did not qualify			
(Belarus) 2018	Did not qualify			
(Hungary) 2022	13th	7	4	3
(Mexico) 2024	Did not qualify			
(Czech Republic) 2026	Did not qualify			
(Indonesia) 2028	To be determined			
Total	3/8	23	12	11

== See also ==
- Belgium women's national basketball team
- Belgium women's national under-19 basketball team
- Belgium men's national under-17 basketball team
