= Greece women's national under-16 basketball team =

Greece
- FIBA zone: FIBA Europe
- National federation: Hellenic Basketball Federation

U17 World Cup
- Appearances: None

U16 EuroBasket
- Appearances: 21
- Medals: None

U16 EuroBasket Division B
- Appearances: 7
- Medals: Gold: 1 (2008); Silver: 1 (2018); Bronze: 1 (2017) ▲ Prom.: 1 (2026)

The Greece women's national under-16 basketball team is a national basketball team of Greece, administered by the Hellenic Basketball Federation. It represents the country in international under-16 women's basketball competitions.

== FIBA U16 Women's EuroBasket participations ==
Year	Division A	Division B
1989	9th	
1991	5th	
1993	7th	
1995	7th	
1999	7th	
2001	11th	
2003	12th	
2004	14th	
2005	13th	
2006	14th	
2007	15th	
2008		1st place, gold medalist(s)
2009	7th	
2010	10th	

Year	Division A	Division B
2011	5th	
2012	10th	
2013	11th	
2014	14th	
2015		8th
2016		5th
2017		3rd place, bronze medalist(s)
2018		2nd place, silver medalist(s)
2019	12th	
2022	6th	
2023	13th	
2024	15th	
2025		9th
2026		Rank 1 trio

== See also ==
- Greece women's national basketball team
- Greece women's national under-18 basketball team
- Greece men's national under-17 basketball team
