= Finland women's national under-16 basketball team =

Finland
- FIBA zone: FIBA Europe
- National federation: Basketball Finland
- Coach: Jussi Räikkä

U17 World Cup
- Appearances: 1 (2024)
- Medals: None

U16 EuroBasket
- Appearances: 14
- Medals: Gold: 1 (2024)

U16 EuroBasket Division B
- Appearances: 13
- Medals: Silver: 1 (2008); Bronze: 1 (2018)

The Finland women's national under-16 and under-17 basketball team is a national women's basketball team of Finland, administered by the Basketball Finland. It represents the country in international under-16 and under-17 women's basketball competitions.

Finnish women's U16 team is the first and only Nordic country who had advanced to qualify for the FIBA U17 Women's World Cup which was held in 2024 in Mexico.

== FIBA U16 Women's EuroBasket participations ==
Year	Division A	Division B
(Poland) 1976	12th	-
(Spain) 1978	8th	-
(Finland) 1982	5th	-
(Socialist Federal Republic of Yugoslavia) 1985	12th	-
(Poland) 1987	8th	-
(Slovakia) 1993	10th	-
(Bosnia and Herzegovina) / (Estonia) 2004	-	15th/16th
(Estonia) 2005	-	12th
(Finland) 2006	-	9th
(Italy) 2007	-	5th
(Bulgaria) 2008	-	2nd place, silver medalist(s)
(Italy) 2009	9th	-
(Greece) 2010	12th	-
(Italy) 2011	16th	-

Year	Division A	Division B
(Estonia) 2012	-	8th
(Portugal) 2013	-	4th
(Estonia) 2014	-	6th
(North Macedonia) 2015	-	10th
(Romania) 2016	-	7th
(North Macedonia) 2017	-	5th
(Montenegro) 2018	-	3rd place, bronze medalist(s)
(North Macedonia) 2019	10th	-
(Portugal) 2022	13th	-
(Turkey) 2023	4th	-
(Hungary) 2024	1st place, gold medalist(s)	-
(Romania) 2025	16th	-
(Luxembourg) 2026	-	Rank 2 trio

== FIBA Under-17 Women's Basketball World Cup record ==
Year	Pos.	Pld	W	L
(France) 2010	Did not qualify			
(Netherlands) 2012	Did not qualify			
(Czech Republic) 2014	Did not qualify			
(Spain) 2016	Did not qualify			
(Belarus) 2018	Did not qualify			
(Hungary) 2022	Did not qualify			
(Mexico) 2024	8th	7	2	5
(Czech Republic) 2026	Did not qualify			
(Indonesia) 2028	Did not qualify			
Total	1/9	7	2	5

== See also ==
- Finland women's national basketball team
- Finland women's national under-18 basketball team
- Finland men's national under-17 basketball team
