= France women's national under-17 basketball team =

France
- FIBA zone: FIBA Europe
- National federation: FFBB
- Coach: Paula Budini

U17 World Cup
- Appearances: 6
- Medals: (silver) Silver: 2 (2010, 2018); (bronze) Bronze: 1 (2022)

U16 EuroBasket
- Appearances: 34
- Medals: Gold: 5 (2001, 2007, 2017, 2022, 2023); Silver: 2 (2005, 2024); Bronze: 7 (1997, 1999, 2008, 2009, 2010, 2016, 2026)
Home	Away

The France women's national under-16 and under-17 basketball team is a national basketball team of France, administered by the Fédération Française de Basket-Ball. It represents the country in international under-16 and under-17 women's basketball competitions.

== FIBA U16 Women's EuroBasket participations ==
Year	Result in Division A
1978	7th
1980	9th
1982	7th
1984	9th
1985	8th
1987	6th
1989	8th
1991	8th
1993	6th
1997	3rd place, bronze medalist(s)
1999	3rd place, bronze medalist(s)
2001	1st place, gold medalist(s)
2003	5th
2004	7th
2005	2nd place, silver medalist(s)
2006	5th
2007	1st place, gold medalist(s)

Year	Result in Division A
2008	3rd place, bronze medalist(s)
2009	3rd place, bronze medalist(s)
2010	3rd place, bronze medalist(s)
2011	7th
2012	5th
2013	5th
2014	4th
2015	6th
2016	3rd place, bronze medalist(s)
2017	1st place, gold medalist(s)
2018	5th
2019	4th
2022	1st place, gold medalist(s)
2023	1st place, gold medalist(s)
2024	2nd place, silver medalist(s)
2025	7th
2026	3rd place, bronze medalist(s)

== FIBA Under-17 Women's Basketball World Cup record ==
Year	Pos.	Pld	W	L
(France) 2010	2nd place, silver medalist(s)	8	5	3
(Netherlands) 2012	Did not qualify			
(Czech Republic) 2014	8th	7	3	4
(Spain) 2016	8th	7	2	5
(Belarus) 2018	2nd place, silver medalist(s)	7	6	1
(Hungary) 2022	3rd place, bronze medalist(s)	7	6	1
(Mexico) 2024	4th	7	4	3
(Czech Republic) 2026	Did not qualify			
(Indonesia) 2028	To be determined			
Total	6/8	43	26	17

== See also ==
- France women's national basketball team
- France women's national under-19 basketball team
- France men's national under-17 basketball team
