= 2019 FIBA U16 Women's European Championship =

31st FIBA Under-16 Women's European Basketball Championship

Tournament details
- Host country: North Macedonia
- Dates: 22–30 August
- Teams: 16
- Venues: 2 (in 1 host city)

Final positions
- Champions: Russia (6th title)

Tournament statistics
- MVP: (Russia) Anastasiia Kosu
- Top scorer: (Greece) Eleni Bosgana (20.2)
- Top rebounds: (Russia) Anastasiia Kosu (15.0)
- Top assists: (Greece) Eleni Bosgana (4.7)
- PPG (Team): (Spain) (78.3)
- RPG (Team): (Germany) (Russia) (53.3)
- APG (Team): (Spain) (17.2)

Official website
- www.fiba.basketball

The 2019 FIBA U16 Women's European Championship was the 31st edition of the Women's European basketball championship for national under-16 teams. It was held from 22 to 30 August in Skopje, North Macedonia. The top five teams qualified for the 2020 FIBA Under-17 Women's Basketball World Cup in Romania besides Romania who automatically qualified as host.

== Venues ==
Skopje		2019 FIBA U16 Women's European Championship is located in North Macedonia
Boris Trajkovski Sports Center	Jane Sandanski Arena II	2019 FIBA U16 Women's European Championship is located in North Macedonia
Capacity: 7,500	Capacity: 5,700	2019 FIBA U16 Women's European Championship is located in North Macedonia

== Participating teams ==
- Belgium
- Czech Republic
- Denmark
- Finland ▲ (Third place, 2018 FIBA U16 Women's European Championship Division B)
- France
- Germany
- Greece ▲ (Runners-up, 2018 FIBA U16 Women's European Championship Division B)
- Hungary
- Italy
- Latvia
- Lithuania
- Poland
- Russia
- Sweden ▲ (Winners, 2018 FIBA U16 Women's European Championship Division B)
- Spain
- Turkey

== First round ==
=== Group A ===
Pos	Team	Pld	W	L	PF	PA	PD	Pts
1	France	3	2	1	219	148	+71	5 (Note: France 1–1, + 3 PD; Germany 1–1, + 1 PD; Lithuania 1–1, – 4 PD)
2	Germany	3	2	1	205	151	+54	5
3	Lithuania	3	2	1	193	161	+32	5
4	Denmark	3	0	3	108	265	−157	3

Source: FIBA
Notes:

22 August
14:15

Boxscore

Germany	92–39	Denmark
Scoring by quarter: 28–14, 24–6, 21–12, 19–9
Pts: Sontag 17; Rebs: Egharevba 12; Asts: Pietsch 6		Pts: Michaelsen 14; Rebs: Michaelsen 9 Asts: Bork 2

Boris Trajkovski Sports Center, Skopje

22 August
21:00

Boxscore

France	61–66	Lithuania
Scoring by quarter: 15–19, 22–12, 12–18, 12–17
Pts: Roumy 24; Rebs: Diarisso 12; Asts: Debroise 3		Pts: Jocytė 21; Rebs: Čižauskaitė 18; Asts: Jocytė 5

Boris Trajkovski Sports Center, Skopje

23 August
16:30

Boxscore

Denmark	29–97	France
Scoring by quarter: 2–27, 5–19, 11–26, 11–25
Pts: Hultén 6 Rebs: Hultén 4 Asts: Hultén 2		Pts: Komara 14; Rebs: Hirsch 6 Asts: Preneau 8

Jane Sandanski Arena II, Skopje

23 August
18:45

Boxscore

Lithuania	51–60	Germany
Scoring by quarter: 12–10, 15–14, 14–17, 10–19
Pts: Zdanevičiūtė 24; Rebs: Januškevičiūtė 5 Asts: Zdanevičiūtė 2		Pts: Egharevba 12; Rebs: Egharevba 13; Asts: Egharevba 2

Jane Sandanski Arena II, Skopje

24 August
14:15

Boxscore

Denmark	40–76	Lithuania
Scoring by quarter: 5-26, 6-23, 13-16, 16-11
Pts: Michaelsen 10; Rebs: Michaelsen 8 Asts: Frisch 5		Pts: Gerkytė 23; Rebs: Pliatkutė 6 Asts: Gerkytė 5

Boris Trajkovski Sports Center, Skopje

24 August
21:00

Boxscore

France	61–53	Germany
Scoring by quarter: 10-15, 12-9, 18-16, 21-13
Pts: Kiavi 10; Rebs: Diarisso 9 Asts: Debroise 6		Pts: Pietsch 17; Rebs: Sontag 12; Asts: Wittenberg 3

Boris Trajkovski Sports Center, Skopje

=== Group B ===
Pos	Team	Pld	W	L	PF	PA	PD	Pts
1	Russia	3	3	0	218	177	+41	6
2	Hungary	3	1	2	193	187	+6	4 (Note: Hungary 1–1, + 9 PD; Italy 1–1, + 5 PD; Finland 1–1, – 14 PD)
3	Italy	3	1	2	175	184	−9	4
4	Finland	3	1	2	173	211	−38	4

Source: FIBA
Notes:

22 August
14:15

Boxscore

Hungary	63–70	Finland
Scoring by quarter: 21–17, 19–22, 5–13, 18–18
Pts: Habling 14; Rebs: Telegdy 8 Asts: Renczes 5		Pts: Sandvik 23; Rebs: Ollilainen 14; Asts: Ollilainen 6

Jane Sandanski Arena II, Skopje

22 August
21:00

Boxscore

Italy	57–71	Russia
Scoring by quarter: 16–18, 15–21, 17–11, 9–21
Pts: Bonchi 20; Rebs: Zanardi 8 Asts: Braida, Zanardi 3		Pts: Bocharova 20; Rebs: Kosu 16; Asts: Kosu 4

Jane Sandanski Arena II, Skopje
Referees: Esperanza Mendoza (ESP), Charalampos Karakatsounis (GRE), Maka Kupatadze (GEO)

23 August
16:30

Boxscore

Finland	49–70	Italy
Scoring by quarter: 11–21, 9–16, 13–13, 16–20
Pts: Haddad 11; Rebs: Ollilainen 7 Asts: Kanerva 3		Pts: Blasigh 24; Rebs: Mbengue 8 Asts: Zanardi 4

Boris Trajkovski Sports Center, Skopje

23 August
18:45

Boxscore

Russia	69–66	Hungary
Scoring by quarter: 24–15, 17–20, 14–15, 14–16
Pts: Kosu 16; Rebs: Kosu 20; Asts: Loginova, Savkovich 3		Pts: Habling 18; Rebs: three players 6 Asts: Krasovec, Renczes 3

Boris Trajkovski Sports Center, Skopje
Referees: Marek Kúkelčík (SVK), Özlem Yalman (TUR), Tom De Lange (BEL)

24 August
14:15

Boxscore

Finland	54–78	Russia
Scoring by quarter: 17–20, 11–20, 9–14, 17–24
Pts: Ollilainen 13; Rebs: Haddad 8 Asts: Sandvik 3		Pts: Kosu 19; Rebs: Kosu 16; Asts: Komarova, Kosu 2

Jane Sandanski Arena II, Skopje
Referees: Kristaps Konstantinovs (LAT), Mehmet Karabilecen (TUR), Charalampos Karakatsounis (GRE)

24 August
21:00

Boxscore

Italy	48–64	Hungary
Scoring by quarter: 12–23, 4–14, 17–14, 15–13
Pts: Blasigh 12; Rebs: Allievi 8 Asts: Zanardi 3		Pts: Habling 19; Rebs: Habling 9 Asts: Renczes 5

Jane Sandanski Arena II, Skopje

=== Group C ===
Pos	Team	Pld	W	L	PF	PA	PD	Pts
1	Spain	3	3	0	244	119	+125	6
2	Belgium	3	2	1	181	166	+15	5
3	Latvia	3	1	2	188	197	−9	4
4	Sweden	3	0	3	99	230	−131	3

Source: FIBA

22 August
16:30

Boxscore

Spain	71–43	Belgium
Scoring by quarter: 15–6, 28–11, 10–16, 18–10
Pts: Morales 14; Rebs: Buenavida 12; Asts: Alarcón 3		Pts: Claessens 13; Rebs: De Vooght 8 Asts: Laurant 2

Boris Trajkovski Sports Center, Skopje

22 August
18:45

Boxscore

Latvia	76–40	Sweden
Scoring by quarter: 17–9, 13–13, 21–10, 25–8
Pts: Bulāne 21; Rebs: Leimane 8 Asts: Bulāne 8		Pts: Lundgren 12; Rebs: Lundgren 8 Asts: Sjökvist 3

Boris Trajkovski Sports Center, Skopje

23 August
14:15

Boxscore

Sweden	24–83	Spain
Scoring by quarter: 4–24, 8–15, 6–20, 8–24
Pts: Berglund 5 Rebs: Sjökvist 5 Asts: Eliasson 1		Pts: Okafor 12; Rebs: Comesaña 10; Asts: Bosch 7

Jane Sandanski Arena II, Skopje

23 August
21:00

Boxscore

Belgium	67–60	Latvia
Scoring by quarter: 19–15, 13–15, 19–14, 16–16
Pts: Franquin 24; Rebs: Claessens 11; Asts: Ndiribe 4		Pts: Krūmina 15; Rebs: Bulāne 7 Asts: Jasa 4

Jane Sandanski Arena II, Skopje

24 August
16:30

Boxscore

Sweden	35–71	Belgium
Scoring by quarter: 8–15, 3–28, 13–19, 11–9
Pts: Lundgren 6 Rebs: Solderblom 10; Asts: Sandberg 2		Pts: Vindevogel 18; Rebs: Laurant 6 Asts: Lundgren 7

Boris Trajkovski Sports Center, Skopje

24 August
18:45

Boxscore

Spain	90–52	Latvia
Scoring by quarter: 21–9, 27–17, 30–10, 12–16
Pts: Morales 22; Rebs: Okafor 8 Asts: Prim 5		Pts: Vīksne 12; Rebs: Vīksne 9 Asts: Leimane 3

Boris Trajkovski Sports Center, Skopje

=== Group D ===
Pos	Team	Pld	W	L	PF	PA	PD	Pts
1	Czech Republic	3	3	0	195	134	+61	6
2	Greece	3	2	1	180	169	+11	5
3	Poland	3	1	2	148	166	−18	4
4	Turkey	3	0	3	139	193	−54	3

Source: FIBA

22 August
16:30

Boxscore

Czech Republic	59–42	Poland
Scoring by quarter: 14–9, 9–14, 23–9, 13–10
Pts: Kadlecová 13; Rebs: Mikšíková 12; Asts: Šafránková 3		Pts: Makurat 9 Rebs: Makurat 10; Asts: Sztąberska 3

Jane Sandanski Arena II, Skopje

22 August
18:45

Boxscore

Turkey	55–65	Greece
Scoring by quarter: 18–18, 11–18, 15–11, 11–18
Pts: Taşer 16; Rebs: Şeren 8 Asts: Yılmaz 4		Pts: Bosgana 29; Rebs: Bosgana 16; Asts: Bosgana 3

Jane Sandanski Arena II, Skopje

23 August
14:15

Boxscore

Greece	47–58	Czech Republic
Scoring by quarter: 11–19, 9–11, 11–20, 16–8
Pts: Polymeni 17; Rebs: Papadopoulou 8 Asts: Bosgana 3		Pts: Zdeňková 17; Rebs: Ceralová 10; Asts: Mikšíková 3

Boris Trajkovski Sports Center, Skopje

23 August
21:00

Boxscore

Poland	50–39	Turkey
Scoring by quarter: 11–10, 13–19, 15–8, 11–4
Pts: Kalenik 12; Rebs: Kalenik 9 Asts: Sztąberska 4		Pts: Akarpa 8 Rebs: Tokmak 10; Asts: Şeren 4

Boris Trajkovski Sports Center, Skopje

24 August
16:30

Boxscore

Greece	68–56	Poland
Scoring by quarter: 17–20, 10–16, 15–16, 26–4
Pts: Bosgana 23; Rebs: Grigoropoulou 18; Asts: Theodosoulaki 8		Pts: Sztąberska 12; Rebs: Kalenik 11; Asts: Masłowska 4

Jane Sandanski Arena II, Skopje

24 August
18:45

Boxscore

Czech Republic	78–45	Turkey
Scoring by quarter: 25–4, 14–21, 18–11, 21–9
Pts: Zdeňková 21; Rebs: Svatoňová 7 Asts: Svatoňová 5		Pts: Gül 10; Rebs: Tokmak 9 Asts: Yılmaz 3

Jane Sandanski Arena II, Skopje

== Knockout stage ==
=== Championship bracket ===
Round of 16
26 August
A1 France	65
B4 Finland	56
26 August
C2 Belgium	58
D3 Poland	51
26 August
B2 Hungary	60
A3 Lithuania	74
26 August
D1 Czech Republic	74
C4 Sweden	51
26 August
A2 Germany	39
B3 Italy	64
26 August
C1 Spain	81
D4 Turkey	40
26 August
B1 Russia	95
A4 Denmark	47
26 August
D2 Greece	55
C3 Latvia	60

Quarter-finals
27 August
France	62
Belgium	41
27 August
Lithuania	72
Czech Republic	69
27 August
Italy	53
Spain	73
27 August
Russia	65
Latvia	63

Semi-finals
29 August
France	51
Lithuania	54
29 August
Spain	60
Russia	64

Final
30 August
Lithuania	66
Russia	73
3rd place game
30 August
France	57
Spain	72

=== Final ===
30 August 2019
21:00

Boxscore

Lithuania	66–73	Russia
Scoring by quarter: 24–20, 14–15, 15–19, 13–19
Scoring by half: 38–35

Sports Centre Boris Trajkovski, Skopje
Attendance: 1000
Referees: Esperanza Mendoza Holgado (ESP), Thomas Bissuel (FRA), Paulina Gajdosz (POL)

=== 5th place bracket ===
5th–8th place semifinals
29 August
Belgium	69
Czech Republic	57
29 August
Italy	58
Latvia	48

5th place game
30 August
Belgium	54
Italy	62
7th place game
30 August
Czech Republic	80
Latvia	45

=== 9th place bracket ===
9th–16th place quarterfinals
27 August
Finland	63
Poland	40
27 August
Hungary	72
Sweden	32
27 August
Germany	62
Turkey	49
27 August
Denmark	44
Greece	89

9th-12th place semifinals
29 August
Finland	64
Hungary	49
29 August
Germany	54
Greece	44

9th place game
30 August
Finland	42
Germany	63
11th place game
30 August
Hungary	65
Greece	52

=== 13th place bracket ===
13th–16th place semifinals
29 August
Poland	53
Sweden	52
29 August
Turkey	53
Denmark	54

13th place game
30 August
Poland	56
Denmark	68
15th place game
30 August
Sweden	50
Turkey	55

== Final standings ==
Rank	Team	Record
1st place, gold medalist(s)	Russia	7–0
2nd place, silver medalist(s)	Lithuania	5–2
3rd place, bronze medalist(s)	Spain	6–1
4	France	4–3
5	Italy	4–3
6	Belgium	4–3
7	Czech Republic	5–2
8	Latvia	2–5
9	Germany	5–2
10	Finland	3–4
11	Hungary	3–4
12	Greece	3–4
13	Denmark	2–5
14	Poland	2–5
15	Turkey	1–6
16	Sweden	0–7

Qualified for the 2020 FIBA Under-17 Women's Basketball World Cup
Relegated to the 2022 FIBA U16 Women's European Championship Division B
Spared from relegation due to the exclusion of Russia

== Awards ==
2019 FIBA Europe Under-16 Championship for Women
Winners

Russia
6th title

Most Valuable Player
(Russia) Anastasiia Kosu

=== All-Tournament Team ===
- (France) Sara Roumy
- (Spain) Marta Morales
- (Lithuania) Justė Jocytė
- (Russia) Anastasiia Kosu
- (Lithuania) Audronė Zdanavičiūtė
