= Poland women's national under-16 basketball team =

Poland
- FIBA zone: FIBA Europe
- National federation: Polish Basketball Federation

U17 World Cup
- Appearances: None

U16 EuroBasket
- Appearances: 25
- Medals: Bronze: 1 (2005)

U16 EuroBasket Division B
- Appearances: 5
- Medals: Gold: 1 (2016)

The Poland women's national under-16 basketball team is a national basketball team of Poland, administered by the Polski Zwiazek Koszykówki. It represents the country in international under-16 women's basketball competitions.

== FIBA U16 Women's EuroBasket participations ==
Year	Division A
1976	5th
1978	5th
1980	8th
1987	12th
1989	10th
1991	7th
1995	11th
1997	9th
1999	6th
2004	12th
2005	3rd place, bronze medalist(s)
2006	6th
2007	10th
2008	6th
2009	10th

Year	Division A	Division B
2010	14th	
2011	15th	
2012		5th
2013		5th
2014		5th
2015		6th
2016		1st place, gold medalist(s)
2017	8th	
2018	8th	
2019	14th	
2022	10th	
2023	6th	
2024	11th	
2025	8th	
2026	9th	

== See also ==
- Poland women's national basketball team
- Poland women's national under-19 basketball team
- Poland men's national under-17 basketball team
