= Hungary women's national under-17 basketball team =

Hungary
- FIBA zone: FIBA Europe
- National federation: MKOSZ
- Coach: Péter Völgyi

U17 World Cup
- Appearances: 3
- Medals: Bronze: 1 (2014)

U16 EuroBasket
- Appearances: 31
- Medals: Silver: 2 (1976, 2017); Bronze: 1 (2013)

U16 EuroBasket Division B
- Appearances: 1
- Medals: Gold: 1 (2010)

The Hungary women's national under-16 and under-17 basketball team is a national basketball team of Hungary, administered by the Hungarian Basketball Federation. It represents the country in international under-16 and under-17 women's basketball competitions.

== U17 World Cup record ==
Year	Pos.	Pld	W	L
(France) 2010	Did not qualify			
(Netherlands) 2012	Did not qualify			
(Czech Republic) 2014	3rd place, bronze medalist(s)	7	6	1
(Spain) 2016	Did not qualify			
(Belarus) 2018	4th	7	5	2
(Hungary) 2022	6th	7	5	2
(Mexico) 2024	Did not qualify			
(Czech Republic) 2026	Did not qualify			
(Indonesia) 2028	To be determined			
Total	3/8	21	16	5

== FIBA U16 Women's EuroBasket participations ==
Year	Division A
1976	2nd place, silver medalist(s)
1980	6th
1982	5th
1984	5th
1985	4th
1987	10th
1989	11th
1991	4th
1993	5th
1997	8th
2001	9th
2004	10th
2005	11th
2006	12th
2007	8th
2008	7th

Year	Division A	Division B
2009	15th	
2010		1st place, gold medalist(s)
2011	12th	
2012	7th	
2013	3rd place, bronze medalist(s)	
2014	6th	
2015	7th	
2016	12th	
2017	2nd place, silver medalist(s)	
2018	7th	
2019	11th	
2022	5th	
2023	8th	
2024	8th	
2025	10th	
2026	5th	

== See also ==
- Hungary women's national basketball team
- Hungary women's national under-19 basketball team
- Hungary men's national under-17 basketball team
