= Germany women's national under-17 basketball team =

Germany
- FIBA zone: FIBA Europe
- National federation: DBB
- Coach: Heiko Czach

U17 World Cup
- Appearances: 2
- Medals: None

U16 EuroBasket
- Appearances: 22
- Medals: Silver: 1 (2016); Bronze: 1 (2025)

U16 EuroBasket Division B
- Appearances: 8
- Medals: Gold: 3 (2011, 2014, 2023); Silver: 1 (2007); Bronze: 1 (2005)
Home	Away

The Germany women's national under-16 and under-17 basketball team is a national basketball team of Germany, administered by the German Basketball Federation (German: Deutscher Basketball Bund e.V.), abbreviated as DBB. It represents the country in under-16 and under-17 women's international basketball competitions.

== Tournament record ==
=== U17 World Cup ===
Year	Pos.	Pld	W	L
(France) 2010	Did not qualify			
(Netherlands) 2012	Did not qualify			
(Czech Republic) 2014	Did not qualify			
(Spain) 2016	Did not qualify			
(Belarus) 2018	Did not qualify			
(Hungary) 2022	7th	7	4	3
(Mexico) 2024	Did not qualify			
(Czech Republic) 2026	13th	7	3	4
(Indonesia) 2028	To be determined			
Total	2/8	14	6	7

=== FIBA U16 EuroBasket ===
Year	Division A	Division B
1978	12th	
1980	12th	
1982	9th	
1984	11th	
1985	11th	
1987	11th	
1989	6th	
1995	9th	
2003	9th	
2004	16th	
2005		3rd place, bronze medalist(s)
2006		8th
2007		2nd place, silver medalist(s)
2008	13th	
2009	16th	

Year	Division A	Division B
2010		5th
2011		1st place, gold medalist(s)
2012	15th	
2013		12th
2014		1st place, gold medalist(s)
2015	9th	
2016	2nd place, silver medalist(s)	
2017	6th	
2018	10th	
2019	9th	
2022	14th	
2023		1st place, gold medalist(s)
2024	7th	
2025	3rd place, bronze medalist(s)	
2026	8th	

== See also ==
- Germany women's national basketball team
- Germany women's national under-19 basketball team
- Germany men's national under-17 basketball team
