= Zagorka Počeković =

Serbian basketball player

Personal information
- Born: 27 January 1965 (age 61) Belgrade, SFR Yugoslavia
- Listed height: 1.91 m (6 ft 3 in)
- Listed weight: 78 kg (172 lb)
- Position: Center

Career history
- Voždovac
- Crvena zvezda

Zagorka Počeković–Čupahin (Serbian Cyrillic: Загорка Почековић–Чупихан, born 27 January 1965) is a Yugoslav former female professional basketball player. She competed for Yugoslavia at the 1984 Summer Olympics.
