= 2009 FIBA Europe Under-16 Championship for Women Division B =

Tournament details
- Host country: Estonia
- City: Tallinn
- Dates: 30 July – 9 August 2009
- Teams: 19 (from 1 confederation)
- Venue(s): 2 (in 1 host city)

Final positions
- Champions: Netherlands (1st title)
- Runners-up: Croatia
- Third place: Slovakia

Official website
- www.fibaeurope.com

The 2009 FIBA Europe Under-16 Championship for Women Division B was the 6th edition of the Division B of the European basketball championship for women's national under-16 teams. It was played in Tallinn, Estonia, from 30 July to 9 August 2009. Netherlands women's national under-16 basketball team won the tournament.

== Participating teams ==
- Austria
- Bosnia and Herzegovina
- Bulgaria
- Croatia
- Denmark
- England
- Estonia
- Ireland
- Israel
- Latvia ▼ (15th place, 2008 FIBA Europe Under-16 Championship for Women Division A)
- Luxembourg
- Montenegro
- Netherlands
- Portugal
- Romania
- Slovakia
- Slovenia
- Switzerland
- Ukraine ▼ (16th place, 2008 FIBA Europe Under-16 Championship for Women Division A)

== Preliminary round ==
In the preliminary round, the teams were drawn into four groups. The first two teams from each group will advance to the 1st–8th place qualifying round (Groups E and F), the third and fourth teams will advance to the 9th–16th place qualifying round (Groups G and H) and the other teams will advance to the 17th–19th place classification (Group I).

=== Group A ===
Pos	Team	Pld	W	L	PF	PA	PD	Pts	Qualification
1	Croatia	4	4	0	296	183	+113	8	1st–8th place qualifying round
2	Slovakia	4	3	1	307	194	+113	7	1st–8th place qualifying round
3	Montenegro	4	1	3	262	303	−41	5	9th–16th place qualifying round
4	Ireland	4	1	3	228	291	−63	5	9th–16th place qualifying round
5	Austria	4	1	3	209	331	−122	5	17th–19th place classification

Source: FIBA Archive

=== Group B ===
Pos	Team	Pld	W	L	PF	PA	PD	Pts	Qualification
1	Romania	4	3	1	265	244	+21	7	1st–8th place qualifying round
2	Latvia	4	3	1	325	221	+104	7	1st–8th place qualifying round
3	Israel	4	2	2	261	262	−1	6	9th–16th place qualifying round
4	Estonia	4	2	2	219	298	−79	6	9th–16th place qualifying round
5	Switzerland	4	0	4	180	225	−45	4	17th–19th place classification

Source: FIBA Archive

=== Group C ===
Pos	Team	Pld	W	L	PF	PA	PD	Pts	Qualification
1	Denmark	4	4	0	267	191	+76	8	1st–8th place qualifying round
2	Bosnia and Herzegovina	4	2	2	259	245	+14	6	1st–8th place qualifying round
3	Slovenia	4	2	2	216	216	0	6	9th–16th place qualifying round
4	Luxembourg	4	2	2	205	209	−4	6	9th–16th place qualifying round
5	Bulgaria	4	0	4	160	246	−86	4	17th–19th place classification

Source: FIBA Archive

=== Group D ===
Pos	Team	Pld	W	L	PF	PA	PD	Pts	Qualification
1	Netherlands	3	3	0	223	144	+79	6	1st–8th place qualifying round
2	Portugal	3	2	1	170	147	+23	5	1st–8th place qualifying round
3	England	3	1	2	131	153	−22	4	9th–16th place qualifying round
4	Ukraine	3	0	3	142	222	−80	3	9th–16th place qualifying round

Source: FIBA Archive

== 1st–8th place qualifying round ==
In this round, the teams play in two groups of four. The first two teams from each group will advance to the Semifinals and the other teams will advance to the 5th–8th place playoffs.

=== Group E ===
Pos	Team	Pld	W	L	PF	PA	PD	Pts	Qualification
1	Croatia	3	3	0	174	140	+34	6	Semifinals
2	Slovakia	3	2	1	200	169	+31	5	Semifinals
3	Romania	3	1	2	178	210	−32	4	5th–8th place playoffs
4	Latvia	3	0	3	169	202	−33	3	5th–8th place playoffs

Source: FIBA Archive

=== Group F ===
Pos	Team	Pld	W	L	PF	PA	PD	Pts	Qualification
1	Netherlands	3	2	1	226	177	+49	5	Semifinals
2	Denmark	3	2	1	208	179	+29	5	Semifinals
3	Portugal	3	2	1	183	184	−1	5	5th–8th place playoffs
4	Bosnia and Herzegovina	3	0	3	154	231	−77	3	5th–8th place playoffs

Source: FIBA Archive

== 9th–16th place qualifying round ==
In this round, the teams play in two groups of four. The first two teams from each group will advance to the 9th–12th place playoffs and the other teams will advance to the 13th–16th place playoffs.

=== Group G ===
Pos	Team	Pld	W	L	PF	PA	PD	Pts	Qualification
1	Montenegro	3	2	1	243	210	+33	5	9th–12th place playoffs
2	Ireland	3	2	1	205	175	+30	5	9th–12th place playoffs
3	Israel	3	2	1	231	211	+20	5	13th–16th place playoffs
4	Estonia	3	0	3	169	252	−83	3	13th–16th place playoffs

Source: FIBA Archive

=== Group H ===
Pos	Team	Pld	W	L	PF	PA	PD	Pts	Qualification
1	Slovenia	3	3	0	183	149	+34	6	9th–12th place playoffs
2	England	3	2	1	176	155	+21	5	9th–12th place playoffs
3	Luxembourg	3	1	2	168	170	−2	4	13th–16th place playoffs
4	Ukraine	3	0	3	144	197	−53	3	13th–16th place playoffs

Source: FIBA Archive

== 17th–19th place classification ==
=== Group I ===
Pos	Team	Pld	W	L	PF	PA	PD	Pts
17	Bulgaria	2	1	1	123	105	+18	3
18	Switzerland	2	1	1	107	104	+3	3
19	Austria	2	1	1	97	118	−21	3

Source: FIBA Archive

== 13th–16th place playoffs ==
13th–16th place semifinals
G3	Israel	71
H4	Ukraine	63
H3	Luxembourg	61
G4	Estonia	71

13th place match
G3	Israel	78
G4	Estonia	66
15th place match
H4	Ukraine	51
H3	Luxembourg	49

== 9th–12th place playoffs ==
9th–12th place semifinals
G1	Montenegro	78
H2	England	57
H1	Slovenia	67
G2	Ireland	40

9th place match
G1	Montenegro	83
H1	Slovenia	74
11th place match
H2	England	69
G2	Ireland	57

== 5th–8th place playoffs ==
5th–8th place semifinals
E3	Romania	53
F4	Bosnia and Herzegovina	69
F3	Portugal	56
E4	Latvia	72

5th place match
F4	Bosnia and Herzegovina	56
E4	Latvia	71
7th place match
E3	Romania	56
F3	Portugal	31

== Championship playoffs ==
Semifinals
E1	Croatia	80
F2	Denmark	58
F1	Netherlands	79
E2	Slovakia	72

Finals
E1	Croatia	59
F1	Netherlands	71
3rd place match
F2	Denmark	50
E2	Slovakia	77

== Final standings ==
Promoted to the 2010 FIBA Europe Under-16 Championship for Women Division A

Rank	Team
1st place, gold medalist(s)	Netherlands
2nd place, silver medalist(s)	Croatia
3rd place, bronze medalist(s)	Slovakia
4	Denmark
5	Latvia
6	Bosnia and Herzegovina
7	Romania
8	Portugal
9	Montenegro
10	Slovenia
11	England
12	Ireland
13	Israel
14	Estonia
15	Ukraine
16	Luxembourg
17	Bulgaria
18	Switzerland
19	Austria
