= 2013 FIBA Europe Under-16 Championship for Women Division B =

Tournament details
- Host country: Portugal
- City: Matosinhos
- Dates: 1–11 August 2013
- Teams: 17 (from 1 confederation)
- Venues: 2 (in 1 host city)

Final positions
- Champions: Serbia (1st title)
- Runners-up: Portugal
- Third place: Denmark

Official website
- www.fibaeurope.com

The 2013 FIBA Europe Under-16 Championship for Women Division B was the 10th edition of the Division B of the European basketball championship for women's national under-16 teams. It was played in Matosinhos, Portugal, from 1 to 11 August 2013. Serbia women's national under-16 basketball team won the tournament.

== Participating teams ==
- Belarus
- Denmark
- England ▼ (16th place, 2012 FIBA Europe Under-16 Championship for Women Division A)
- Estonia
- Finland
- Germany ▼ (15th place, 2012 FIBA Europe Under-16 Championship for Women Division A)
- Ireland
- Israel
- Luxembourg
- Norway
- Poland
- Portugal
- Romania
- Serbia ▼ (14th place, 2012 FIBA Europe Under-16 Championship for Women Division A)
- Slovenia
- Switzerland
- Ukraine

== First round ==
In the first round, the teams were drawn into four groups. The first two teams from each group will advance to the Quarterfinal Groups E and F and the other teams will advance to the 9th–17th place classification (Groups G, H and I).

=== Group A ===
Pos	Team	Pld	W	L	PF	PA	PD	Pts	Qualification
1	Serbia	4	4	0	329	165	+164	8	1st–8th place classification
2	Belarus	4	3	1	229	202	+27	7	1st–8th place classification
3	Ukraine	4	2	2	237	244	−7	6	9th–17th place classification
4	Switzerland	4	1	3	232	250	−18	5	9th–17th place classification
5	Norway	4	0	4	127	293	−166	4	9th–17th place classification

Source: FIBA Archive

=== Group B ===
Pos	Team	Pld	W	L	PF	PA	PD	Pts	Qualification
1	Finland	3	2	1	176	142	+34	5	1st–8th place classification
2	England	3	2	1	153	147	+6	5	1st–8th place classification
3	Luxembourg	3	2	1	133	138	−5	5	9th–17th place classification
4	Romania	3	0	3	147	182	−35	3	9th–17th place classification

Source: FIBA Archive

=== Group C ===
Pos	Team	Pld	W	L	PF	PA	PD	Pts	Qualification
1	Portugal	3	3	0	264	147	+117	6	1st–8th place classification
2	Denmark	3	2	1	203	208	−5	5	1st–8th place classification
3	Germany	3	1	2	202	187	+15	4	9th–17th place classification
4	Ireland	3	0	3	161	288	−127	3	9th–17th place classification

Source: FIBA Archive

=== Group D ===
Pos	Team	Pld	W	L	PF	PA	PD	Pts	Qualification
1	Poland	3	3	0	173	143	+30	6	1st–8th place classification
2	Israel	3	2	1	165	157	+8	5	1st–8th place classification
3	Slovenia	3	1	2	188	166	+22	4	9th–17th place classification
4	Estonia	3	0	3	136	196	−60	3	9th–17th place classification

Source: FIBA Archive

== 1st–8th place classification ==
=== Group E ===
Pos	Team	Pld	W	L	PF	PA	PD	Pts	Qualification
1	Serbia	3	3	0	223	144	+79	6	Semifinal
2	Finland	3	2	1	170	159	+11	5	Semifinal
3	England	3	1	2	154	200	−46	4	5th–8th place playoffs
4	Belarus	3	0	3	143	187	−44	3	5th–8th place playoffs

Source: FIBA Archive

=== Group F ===
Pos	Team	Pld	W	L	PF	PA	PD	Pts	Qualification
1	Portugal	3	3	0	227	132	+95	6	Semifinal
2	Denmark	3	2	1	189	198	−9	5	Semifinal
3	Poland	3	1	2	181	213	−32	4	5th–8th place playoffs
4	Israel	3	0	3	131	185	−54	3	5th–8th place playoffs

Source: FIBA Archive

== 9th–17th place classification ==
=== Group G ===
Pos	Team	Pld	W	L	PF	PA	PD	Pts	Qualification
1	Ukraine	2	2	0	141	94	+47	4	9th–11th place classification
2	Romania	2	1	1	130	114	+16	3	12th–14th place classification
3	Ireland	2	0	2	95	158	−63	2	15th–17th place classification

Source: FIBA Archive

=== Group H ===
Pos	Team	Pld	W	L	PF	PA	PD	Pts	Qualification
1	Luxembourg	2	2	0	121	81	+40	4	9th–11th place classification
2	Switzerland	2	1	1	98	110	−12	3	12th–14th place classification
3	Estonia	2	0	2	94	122	−28	2	15th–17th place classification

Source: FIBA Archive

=== Group I ===
Pos	Team	Pld	W	L	PF	PA	PD	Pts	Qualification
1	Slovenia	2	2	0	146	78	+68	4	9th–11th place classification
2	Germany	2	1	1	126	92	+34	3	12th–14th place classification
3	Norway	2	0	2	48	150	−102	2	15th–17th place classification

Source: FIBA Archive

== 15th–17th place classification ==
Pos	Team	Pld	W	L	PF	PA	PD	Pts
15	Ireland	2	2	0	142	113	+29	4
16	Estonia	2	1	1	119	118	+1	3
17	Norway	2	0	2	86	116	−30	2

Source: FIBA Archive

== 12th–14th place classification ==
Pos	Team	Pld	W	L	PF	PA	PD	Pts
12	Germany	2	2	0	126	98	+28	4
13	Switzerland	2	1	1	120	128	−8	3
14	Romania	2	0	2	109	129	−20	2

Source: FIBA Archive

== 9th–11th place classification ==
Pos	Team	Pld	W	L	PF	PA	PD	Pts
9	Slovenia	2	1	1	139	116	+23	3
10	Luxembourg	2	1	1	123	122	+1	3
11	Ukraine	2	1	1	115	139	−24	3

Source: FIBA Archive

== 5th–8th place playoffs ==
5th–8th place semifinals
E3	England	50
F4	Israel	62
F3	Poland	65
E4	Belarus	63

5th place match
F4	Israel	52
F3	Poland	56
7th place match
E3	England	47
E4	Belarus	46

== Championship playoffs ==
Semifinals
E1	Serbia	77
F2	Denmark	46
F1	Portugal	71
E2	Finland	47

Finals
E1	Serbia	58
F1	Portugal	54
3rd place match
F2	Denmark	76
E2	Finland	67

== Final standings ==
Promoted to the 2014 FIBA Europe Under-16 Championship for Women Division A

Rank	Team
1st place, gold medalist(s)	Serbia
2nd place, silver medalist(s)	Portugal
3rd place, bronze medalist(s)	Denmark
4	Finland
5	Poland
6	Israel
7	England
8	Belarus
9	Slovenia
10	Luxembourg
11	Ukraine
12	Germany
13	Switzerland
14	Romania
15	Ireland
16	Estonia
17	Norway
