= 2010 FIBA Europe Under-16 Championship for Women Division B =

Women's basketball tournament

Tournament details
- Host country: Republic of Macedonia
- City: Skopje
- Dates: 12–22 August 2010
- Teams: 16 (from 1 confederation)
- Venue(s): 2 (in 1 host city)

Final positions
- Champions: Hungary (1st title)
- Runners-up: Slovakia
- Third place: Portugal

Official website
- www.fibaeurope.com

The 2010 FIBA Europe Under-16 Championship for Women Division B was the 7th edition of the Division B of the European basketball championship for women's national under-16 teams. It was played in Skopje, Republic of Macedonia, from 12 to 22 August 2010. Hungary women's national under-16 basketball team won the tournament.

== Participating teams ==
- Bulgaria
- Denmark
- England
- Germany ▼ (16th place, 2009 FIBA Europe Under-16 Championship for Women Division A)
- Hungary ▼ (15th place, 2009 FIBA Europe Under-16 Championship for Women Division A)
- Ireland
- Israel
- Latvia
- Luxembourg
- Macedonia
- Portugal
- Romania
- Slovakia
- Slovenia
- Switzerland
- Ukraine

== First round ==
In the first round, the teams were drawn into four groups of four. The first three teams from each group will advance to the second round (Groups E and F) and the last teams will advance to the 13th–16th place classification (Group G).

=== Group A ===
| Pos | Team | Pld | W | L | PF | PA | PD | Pts | Qualification |
|---|---|---|---|---|---|---|---|---|---|
| 1 | Hungary | 3 | 3 | 0 | 223 | 157 | +66 | 6 | Second round |
| 2 | Portugal | 3 | 2 | 1 | 172 | 145 | +27 | 5 | Second round |
| 3 | Bulgaria | 3 | 1 | 2 | 174 | 182 | −8 | 4 | Second round |
| 4 | Switzerland | 3 | 0 | 3 | 123 | 208 | −85 | 3 | 13th–16th place classification |

Source: FIBA Archive

=== Group B ===
| Pos | Team | Pld | W | L | PF | PA | PD | Pts | Qualification |
|---|---|---|---|---|---|---|---|---|---|
| 1 | Latvia | 3 | 2 | 1 | 180 | 139 | +41 | 5 | Second round |
| 2 | Slovenia | 3 | 2 | 1 | 171 | 144 | +27 | 5 | Second round |
| 3 | Denmark | 3 | 2 | 1 | 207 | 179 | +28 | 5 | Second round |
| 4 | Luxembourg | 3 | 0 | 3 | 114 | 210 | −96 | 3 | 13th–16th place classification |

Source: FIBA Archive

=== Group C ===
| Pos | Team | Pld | W | L | PF | PA | PD | Pts | Qualification |
|---|---|---|---|---|---|---|---|---|---|
| 1 | Slovakia | 3 | 3 | 0 | 256 | 143 | +113 | 6 | Second round |
| 2 | England | 3 | 2 | 1 | 188 | 174 | +14 | 5 | Second round |
| 3 | Romania | 3 | 1 | 2 | 182 | 206 | −24 | 4 | Second round |
| 4 | Macedonia | 3 | 0 | 3 | 132 | 235 | −103 | 3 | 13th–16th place classification |

Source: FIBA Archive

=== Group D ===
| Pos | Team | Pld | W | L | PF | PA | PD | Pts | Qualification |
|---|---|---|---|---|---|---|---|---|---|
| 1 | Germany | 3 | 3 | 0 | 216 | 108 | +108 | 6 | Second round |
| 2 | Israel | 3 | 2 | 1 | 169 | 163 | +6 | 5 | Second round |
| 3 | Ireland | 3 | 1 | 2 | 106 | 171 | −65 | 4 | Second round |
| 4 | Ukraine | 3 | 0 | 3 | 147 | 196 | −49 | 3 | 13th–16th place classification |

Source: FIBA Archive

== Second round ==
In the second round, the teams play in two groups of six. The first four teams from each group will advance to the Quarterfinals and the other teams will advance to the 9th–12th place playoffs.

=== Group E ===
| Pos | Team | Pld | W | L | PF | PA | PD | Pts | Qualification |
|---|---|---|---|---|---|---|---|---|---|
| 1 | Hungary | 5 | 4 | 1 | 333 | 264 | +69 | 9 | Quarterfinals |
| 2 | Portugal | 5 | 3 | 2 | 272 | 232 | +40 | 8 | Quarterfinals |
| 3 | Bulgaria | 5 | 3 | 2 | 301 | 315 | −14 | 8 | Quarterfinals |
| 4 | Slovenia | 5 | 2 | 3 | 267 | 316 | −49 | 7 | Quarterfinals |
| 5 | Latvia | 5 | 2 | 3 | 255 | 245 | +10 | 7 | 9th–12th place playoffs |
| 6 | Denmark | 5 | 1 | 4 | 276 | 332 | −56 | 6 | 9th–12th place playoffs |

Source: FIBA Archive

=== Group F ===
| Pos | Team | Pld | W | L | PF | PA | PD | Pts | Qualification |
|---|---|---|---|---|---|---|---|---|---|
| 1 | Slovakia | 5 | 5 | 0 | 394 | 272 | +122 | 10 | Quarterfinals |
| 2 | England | 5 | 3 | 2 | 310 | 284 | +26 | 8 | Quarterfinals |
| 3 | Germany | 5 | 3 | 2 | 373 | 302 | +71 | 8 | Quarterfinals |
| 4 | Romania | 5 | 2 | 3 | 308 | 341 | −33 | 7 | Quarterfinals |
| 5 | Israel | 5 | 2 | 3 | 264 | 291 | −27 | 7 | 9th–12th place playoffs |
| 6 | Ireland | 5 | 0 | 5 | 164 | 323 | −159 | 5 | 9th–12th place playoffs |

Source: FIBA Archive

== 13th–16th place classification ==
=== Group G ===
| Pos | Team | Pld | W | L | PF | PA | PD | Pts |
|---|---|---|---|---|---|---|---|---|
| 13 | Ukraine | 6 | 6 | 0 | 392 | 279 | +113 | 12 |
| 14 | Macedonia | 6 | 3 | 3 | 306 | 328 | −22 | 9 |
| 15 | Switzerland | 6 | 2 | 4 | 275 | 332 | −57 | 8 |
| 16 | Luxembourg | 6 | 1 | 5 | 291 | 325 | −34 | 7 |

Source: FIBA Archive

== 9th–12th place playoffs ==
9th–12th place semifinals
E5 | Latvia | 64
F6 | Ireland | 33
F5 | Israel | 67
E6 | Denmark | 56

9th place match
E5 | Latvia | 61
F5 | Israel | 48
11th place match
F6 | Ireland | 36
E6 | Denmark | 50

== Championship playoffs ==
Fifth place
E3 | Bulgaria | 55
F3 | Germany | 65
Seventh place
F4 | Romania | 59
E4 | Slovenia | 63

Consolation semifinals
F4 | Romania | 50
E3 | Bulgaria | 52
F3 | Germany | 51
E4 | Slovenia | 36

Quarterfinals
E1 | Hungary | 65
F4 | Romania | 50
F2 | England | 62
E3 | Bulgaria | 58
E2 | Portugal | 63
F3 | Germany | 54
F1 | Slovakia | 70
E4 | Slovenia | 60

Semifinals
E1 | Hungary | 65
F2 | England | 50
E2 | Portugal | 53
F1 | Slovakia | 62

Final
E1 | Hungary | 55
F1 | Slovakia | 44
Third place
F2 | England | 52
E2 | Portugal | 78

== Final standings ==
| Promoted to the 2011 FIBA Europe Under-16 Championship for Women Division A |

| Rank | Team |
|---|---|
| 1st place, gold medalist(s) | Hungary |
| 2nd place, silver medalist(s) | Slovakia |
| 3rd place, bronze medalist(s) | Portugal |
| 4 | England |
| 5 | Germany |
| 6 | Bulgaria |
| 7 | Slovenia |
| 8 | Romania |
| 9 | Latvia |
| 10 | Israel |
| 11 | Denmark |
| 12 | Ireland |
| 13 | Ukraine |
| 14 | Macedonia |
| 15 | Switzerland |
| 16 | Luxembourg |
