= 2005 FIBA Europe Under-16 Championship for Women Division B =

Tournament details
- Host country: Estonia
- City: Tallinn
- Dates: 22–31 July 2005
- Teams: 16 (from 1 confederation)
- Venue(s): 2 (in 1 host city)

Final positions
- Champions: Slovakia (1st title)
- Runners-up: Estonia
- Third place: Germany

The 2005 FIBA Europe Under-16 Championship for Women Division B was the second edition of the Division B of the European basketball championship for women's national under-16 teams. It was played in Tallinn, Estonia, from 22 to 31 July 2005. Slovakia women's national under-16 basketball team won the tournament.

== Participating teams ==
- Austria
- Bosnia and Herzegovina
- England
- Estonia
- Finland
- Germany ▼ (16th place, 2004 FIBA Europe Under-16 Championship for Women Division A)
- Iceland
- Ireland
- Israel
- Latvia
- Netherlands
- Portugal
- Romania
- Slovakia ▼ (15th place, 2004 FIBA Europe Under-16 Championship for Women Division A)
- Slovenia
- Sweden

== Preliminary round ==
In the preliminary round, the teams were drawn into four groups of four. The first two teams from each group advance to the quarterfinal round (Groups E and F), while the third and fourth teams advance to the Classification round (Groups G and H).

=== Group A ===
Pos	Team	Pld	W	L	PF	PA	PD	Pts	Qualification
1	Estonia	3	3	0	198	166	+32	6	Quarterfinal round
2	Ireland	3	2	1	177	152	+25	5	Quarterfinal round
3	Bosnia and Herzegovina	3	1	2	181	179	+2	4	Classification round
4	Portugal	3	0	3	150	209	−59	3	Classification round

Source: FIBA Archive

22 July 2005

Boxscore

Portugal	44–69	Ireland

22 July 2005

Boxscore

Estonia	67–64	Bosnia and Herzegovina

23 July 2005

Boxscore

Bosnia and Herzegovina	63–53	Portugal

23 July 2005

Boxscore

Ireland	49–54	Estonia

24 July 2005

Boxscore

Bosnia and Herzegovina	54–59	Ireland

24 July 2005

Boxscore

Portugal	53–77	Estonia

=== Group B ===
Pos	Team	Pld	W	L	PF	PA	PD	Pts	Qualification
1	Slovenia	3	3	0	210	138	+72	6	Quarterfinal round
2	Sweden	3	2	1	171	126	+45	5	Quarterfinal round
3	Netherlands	3	1	2	159	157	+2	4	Classification round
4	Iceland	3	0	3	98	217	−119	3	Classification round

Source: FIBA Archive

22 July 2005

Boxscore

Sweden	53–42	Netherlands

22 July 2005

Boxscore

Slovenia	94–26	Iceland

23 July 2005

Boxscore

Iceland	30–65	Sweden

23 July 2005

Boxscore

Netherlands	59–62	Slovenia

24 July 2005

Boxscore

Iceland	42–58	Netherlands

24 July 2005

Boxscore

Sweden	53–54	Slovenia

=== Group C ===
Pos	Team	Pld	W	L	PF	PA	PD	Pts	Qualification
1	Slovakia	3	3	0	285	152	+133	6	Quarterfinal round
2	England	3	2	1	233	173	+60	5	Quarterfinal round
3	Israel	3	1	2	233	225	+8	4	Classification round
4	Austria	3	0	3	100	301	−201	3	Classification round

Source: FIBA Archive

22 July 2005

Boxscore

Israel	94–40	Austria

22 July 2005

Boxscore

England	56–70	Slovakia

23 July 2005

Boxscore

Slovakia	101–67	Israel

23 July 2005

Boxscore

Austria	31–93	England

24 July 2005

Boxscore

Israel	72–84	England

24 July 2005

Boxscore

Slovakia	114–29	Austria

=== Group D ===
Pos	Team	Pld	W	L	PF	PA	PD	Pts	Qualification
1	Germany	3	3	0	227	164	+63	6	Quarterfinal round
2	Romania	3	2	1	195	188	+7	5	Quarterfinal round
3	Finland	3	1	2	156	208	−52	4	Classification round
4	Latvia	3	0	3	200	218	−18	3	Classification round

Source: FIBA Archive

22 July 2005

Boxscore

Latvia	67–68	Finland

22 July 2005

Boxscore

Romania	59–72	Germany

23 July 2005

Boxscore

Germany	77–68	Latvia

23 July 2005

Boxscore

Finland	51–63	Romania

24 July 2005

Boxscore

Latvia	65–73	Romania

24 July 2005

Boxscore

Germany	78–37	Finland

== Quarterfinal round ==
In the quarterfinal round, the teams play in two groups of four. The first two teams from each group advance to the semifinals; the other teams advance to the 5th–8th place playoffs.

=== Group E ===
Pos	Team	Pld	W	L	PF	PA	PD	Pts	Qualification
1	Slovakia	3	2	1	198	161	+37	5	Semifinals
2	Estonia	3	2	1	211	219	−8	5	Semifinals
3	Romania	3	1	2	164	193	−29	4	5th–8th place playoffs
4	Sweden	3	1	2	177	177	0	4	5th–8th place playoffs

Source: FIBA Archive

26 July 2005

Boxscore

Estonia	79–68	Romania

26 July 2005

Boxscore

Sweden	62–48	Slovakia

27 July 2005

Boxscore

Slovakia	90–62	Estonia

27 July 2005

Boxscore

Romania	59–54	Sweden

28 July 2005

Boxscore

Estonia	70–61	Sweden

28 July 2005

Boxscore

Slovakia	60–37	Romania

=== Group F ===
Pos	Team	Pld	W	L	PF	PA	PD	Pts	Qualification
1	Germany	3	2	1	186	158	+28	5	Semifinals
2	England	3	2	1	180	158	+22	5	Semifinals
3	Ireland	3	1	2	152	203	−51	4	5th–8th place playoffs
4	Slovenia	3	1	2	187	186	+1	4	5th–8th place playoffs

Source: FIBA Archive

26 July 2005

Boxscore

Ireland	52–74	Germany

26 July 2005

Boxscore

Slovenia	65–67	England

27 July 2005

Boxscore

England	69–39	Ireland

27 July 2005

Boxscore

Germany	58–62	Slovenia

28 July 2005

Boxscore

Ireland	61–60	Slovenia

28 July 2005

Boxscore

England	44–54	Germany

== Classification round ==
In the Classification round, the teams play in two groups of four. The first two teams from each group advance to the 9th–12th place playoffs; the other teams advance to the 13th–16th place playoffs.

=== Group G ===
Pos	Team	Pld	W	L	PF	PA	PD	Pts	Qualification
1	Israel	3	3	0	201	165	+36	6	9th–12th place playoffs
2	Latvia	3	2	1	217	174	+43	5	9th–12th place playoffs
3	Bosnia and Herzegovina	3	1	2	169	172	−3	4	13th–16th place playoffs
4	Iceland	3	0	3	156	232	−76	3	13th–16th place playoffs

Source: FIBA Archive

26 July 2005

Boxscore

Bosnia and Herzegovina	43–57	Latvia

26 July 2005

Boxscore

Iceland	46–65	Israel

27 July 2005

Boxscore

Israel	65–60	Bosnia and Herzegovina

27 July 2005

Boxscore

Latvia	101–60	Iceland

28 July 2005

Boxscore

Bosnia and Herzegovina	66–50	Iceland

28 July 2005

Boxscore

Israel	71–59	Latvia

=== Group H ===
Pos	Team	Pld	W	L	PF	PA	PD	Pts	Qualification
1	Netherlands	3	3	0	0	0	0	6	9th–12th place playoffs
2	Finland	3	2	1	0	0	0	5	9th–12th place playoffs
3	Portugal	3	1	2	0	0	0	4	13th–16th place playoffs
4	Austria	3	0	3	0	0	0	3	13th–16th place playoffs

Source: FIBA Archive

26 July 2005

Boxscore

Portugal	44–51	Finland

26 July 2005

Boxscore

Netherlands	103–37	Austria

27 July 2005

Boxscore

Austria	48–69	Portugal

27 July 2005

Boxscore

Finland	56–60	Netherlands

28 July 2005

Boxscore

Portugal	30–50	Netherlands

28 July 2005

Boxscore

Austria	24–80	Finland

== 13th–16th place playoffs ==
13th–16th place semifinals
G3	Bosnia and Herzegovina	88
H4	Austria	35
G4	Iceland	56
H3	Portugal	76

13th place match
G3	Bosnia and Herzegovina	69
H3	Portugal	55
15th place match
H4	Austria	42
G4	Iceland	66

=== 13th–16th place semifinals ===
30 July 2005

Boxscore

Bosnia and Herzegovina	88–35	Austria

30 July 2005

Boxscore

Iceland	56–76	Portugal

=== 15th place match ===
31 July 2005

Boxscore

Austria	42–66	Iceland

=== 13th place match ===
31 July 2005

Boxscore

Bosnia and Herzegovina	69–55	Portugal

== 9th–12th place playoffs ==
9th–12th place semifinals
G1	Israel	67
H2	Finland	58
G2	Latvia	65
H1	Netherlands	52

9th place match
G1	Israel	60
G2	Latvia	56
11th place match
H2	Finland	58
H1	Netherlands	60

=== 9th–12th place semifinals ===
30 July 2005

Boxscore

Israel	67–58	Finland

30 July 2005

Boxscore

Latvia	65–52	Netherlands

=== 11th place match ===
31 July 2005

Boxscore

Finland	58–60	Netherlands

=== 9th place match ===
31 July 2005

Boxscore

Israel	60–56	Latvia

== 5th–8th place playoffs ==
5th–8th place semifinals
E3	Romania	70
F4	Slovenia	67
E4	Sweden	70
F3	Ireland	50

5th place match
E3	Romania	78
E4	Sweden	72
7th place match
F4	Slovenia	63
F3	Ireland	60

=== 5th–8th place semifinals ===
30 July 2005

Boxscore

Romania	70–67	Slovenia

30 July 2005

Boxscore

Sweden	70–50	Ireland

=== 7th place match ===
31 July 2005

Boxscore

Slovenia	63–60	Ireland

=== 5th place match ===
31 July 2005

Boxscore

Romania	78–72	Sweden

== Championship playoffs ==
Semifinals
E1	Slovakia	65
F2	England	38
E2	Estonia	76
F1	Germany	60

Finals
E1	Slovakia	85
E2	Estonia	55
3rd place match
F2	England	59
F1	Germany	71

=== Semifinals ===
30 July 2005

Boxscore

Slovakia	65–38	England

30 July 2005

Boxscore

Estonia	76–60	Germany

=== 3rd place match ===
31 July 2005

Boxscore

England	59–71	Germany

=== Final ===
31 July 2005

Boxscore

Slovakia	85–55	Estonia

== Final standings ==
Rank	Team
1st place, gold medalist(s)	Slovakia
2nd place, silver medalist(s)	Estonia
3rd place, bronze medalist(s)	Germany
4	England
5	Romania
6	Sweden
7	Slovenia
8	Ireland
9	Israel
10	Latvia
11	Netherlands
12	Finland
13	Bosnia and Herzegovina
14	Portugal
15	Iceland
16	Austria

Promoted to the 2006 FIBA Europe Under-16 Championship for Women Division A
