= 2004 FIBA Europe Under-16 Championship for Women Division B =

Tournament details
- Host countries: Bosnia and Herzegovina; Estonia
- City: Brčko; Rakvere
- Dates: 30 July – 8 August 2004
- Teams: 17 (from 1 confederation)
- Venue(s): 2 (in 2 host cities)

Final positions
- Champions: Ukraine; Lithuania

The 2004 FIBA Europe Under-16 Championship for Women Division B was the first edition of the Division B of the European basketball championship for women's national under-16 teams. 17 teams were drawn into two groups. Group A tournament was played in Brčko, Bosnia and Herzegovina, from 30 July to 6 August 2004 and Group B tournament was played in Rakvere, Estonia, from 30 July to 8 August 2004. Ukraine and Lithuania won the tournaments and were promoted to the 2005 FIBA Europe Under-16 Championship for Women Division A.

== Participating teams ==
Group A

- Albania
- Bosnia and Herzegovina
- Israel
- Luxembourg
- Portugal
- Romania
- Slovenia
- Ukraine

Group B

- England
- Estonia
- Finland
- Iceland
- Ireland
- Latvia
- Lithuania
- Netherlands
- Sweden

== Group A tournament ==
=== Final standings ===
Pos	Team	Pld	W	L	PF	PA	PD	Pts	Promotion
1	Ukraine	7	7	0	590	332	+258	14	2005 Division A
2	Bosnia and Herzegovina	7	6	1	429	344	+85	13	
3	Israel	7	5	2	502	384	+118	12	
4	Portugal	7	4	3	431	386	+45	11	
5	Romania	7	3	4	417	400	+17	10	
6	Slovenia	7	2	5	458	412	+46	9	
7	Luxembourg	7	1	6	361	492	−131	8	
8	Albania	7	0	7	260	698	−438	7	

Source: FIBA Archive

=== Results ===
30 July 2004

Boxscore

Albania	43–133	Ukraine

Brčko, Bosnia and Herzegovina

30 July 2004

Boxscore

Romania	68–75	Israel

Brčko, Bosnia and Herzegovina

30 July 2004

Boxscore

Portugal	72–63	Slovenia

Brčko, Bosnia and Herzegovina

30 July 2004

Boxscore

Luxembourg	55–80	Bosnia and Herzegovina

Brčko, Bosnia and Herzegovina

31 July 2004

Boxscore

Romania	43–61	Portugal

Brčko, Bosnia and Herzegovina

31 July 2004

Boxscore

Slovenia	85–56	Luxembourg

Brčko, Bosnia and Herzegovina

31 July 2004

Boxscore

Bosnia and Herzegovina	90–34	Albania

Brčko, Bosnia and Herzegovina

31 July 2004

Boxscore

Israel	63–73	Ukraine

Brčko, Bosnia and Herzegovina

1 August 2004

Boxscore

Luxembourg	46–53	Romania

Brčko, Bosnia and Herzegovina

1 August 2004

Boxscore

Ukraine	61–39	Bosnia and Herzegovina

Brčko, Bosnia and Herzegovina

1 August 2004

Boxscore

Portugal	54–58	Israel

Brčko, Bosnia and Herzegovina

1 August 2004

Boxscore

Albania	31–104	Slovenia

Brčko, Bosnia and Herzegovina

2 August 2004

Boxscore

Portugal	66–37	Luxembourg

Brčko, Bosnia and Herzegovina

2 August 2004

Boxscore

Israel	50–62	Bosnia and Herzegovina

Brčko, Bosnia and Herzegovina

2 August 2004

Boxscore

Slovenia	53–70	Ukraine

Brčko, Bosnia and Herzegovina

2 August 2004

Boxscore

Romania	82–37	Albania

Brčko, Bosnia and Herzegovina

4 August 2004

Boxscore

Bosnia and Herzegovina	49–47	Slovenia

Brčko, Bosnia and Herzegovina

4 August 2004

Boxscore

Albania	40–92	Portugal

Brčko, Bosnia and Herzegovina

4 August 2004

Boxscore

Luxembourg	46–72	Israel

Brčko, Bosnia and Herzegovina

4 August 2004

Boxscore

Ukraine	68–46	Romania

Brčko, Bosnia and Herzegovina

5 August 2004

Boxscore

Israel	63–51	Slovenia

Brčko, Bosnia and Herzegovina

5 August 2004

Boxscore

Luxembourg	76–45	Albania

Brčko, Bosnia and Herzegovina

5 August 2004

Boxscore

Romania	54–58	Bosnia and Herzegovina

Brčko, Bosnia and Herzegovina

5 August 2004

Boxscore

Portugal	43–94	Ukraine

Brčko, Bosnia and Herzegovina

6 August 2004

Boxscore

Albania	30–121	Israel

Brčko, Bosnia and Herzegovina

6 August 2004

Boxscore

Slovenia	55–71	Romania

Brčko, Bosnia and Herzegovina

6 August 2004

Boxscore

Ukraine	91–45	Luxembourg

Brčko, Bosnia and Herzegovina

6 August 2004

Boxscore

Bosnia and Herzegovina	51–43	Portugal

Brčko, Bosnia and Herzegovina

== Group B tournament ==
=== Final standings ===
Pos	Team	Pld	W	L	PF	PA	PD	Pts	Promotion
1	Lithuania	8	7	1	610	483	+127	15	2005 Division A
2	Iceland	8	7	1	599	534	+65	15	
3	Sweden	8	6	2	537	431	+106	14	
4	Latvia	8	6	2	582	459	+123	14	
5	England	8	4	4	484	531	−47	12	
6	Estonia	8	3	5	558	581	−23	11	
7	Netherlands	8	2	6	463	539	−76	10	
8	Finland	8	1	7	499	582	−83	9	
9	Ireland	8	0	8	454	646	−192	8	

Source: FIBA Archive

=== Results ===
30 July 2004

Boxscore

England	39–72	Sweden

Rakvere, Estonia

30 July 2004

Boxscore

Latvia	79–56	Lithuania

Rakvere, Estonia

30 July 2004

Boxscore

Ireland	50–74	Estonia

Rakvere, Estonia

30 July 2004

Boxscore

Iceland	69–50	Netherlands

Rakvere, Estonia

31 July 2004

Boxscore

Finland	39–71	Latvia

Rakvere, Estonia

31 July 2004

Boxscore

Netherlands	58–73	England

Rakvere, Estonia

31 July 2004

Boxscore

Estonia	73–76	Iceland

Rakvere, Estonia

31 July 2004

Boxscore

Lithuania	94–60	Ireland

Rakvere, Estonia

1 August 2004

Boxscore

Sweden	55–45	Netherlands

Rakvere, Estonia

1 August 2004

Boxscore

Iceland	77–94	Lithuania

Rakvere, Estonia

1 August 2004

Boxscore

England	77–72	Estonia

Rakvere, Estonia

1 August 2004

Boxscore

Ireland	47–87	Finland

Rakvere, Estonia

2 August 2004

Boxscore

Lithuania	67–42	England

Rakvere, Estonia

2 August 2004

Boxscore

Finland	64–86	Iceland

Rakvere, Estonia

2 August 2004

Boxscore

Estonia	62–82	Sweden

Rakvere, Estonia

2 August 2004

Boxscore

Latvia	90–54	Ireland

Rakvere, Estonia

3 August 2004

Boxscore

Sweden	60–62	Lithuania

Rakvere, Estonia

3 August 2004

Boxscore

Iceland	68–64	Latvia

Rakvere, Estonia

3 August 2004

Boxscore

Netherlands	56–65	Estonia

Rakvere, Estonia

3 August 2004

Boxscore

England	69–63	Finland

Rakvere, Estonia

5 August 2004

Boxscore

Ireland	58–86	Iceland

Rakvere, Estonia

5 August 2004

Boxscore

Lithuania	72–54	Netherlands

Rakvere, Estonia

5 August 2004

Boxscore

Latvia	63–44	England

Rakvere, Estonia

5 August 2004

Boxscore

Finland	42–69	Sweden

Rakvere, Estonia

6 August 2004

Boxscore

England	72–65	Ireland

Rakvere, Estonia

6 August 2004

Boxscore

Netherlands	67–66	Finland

Rakvere, Estonia

6 August 2004

Boxscore

Estonia	43–89	Lithuania

Rakvere, Estonia

6 August 2004

Boxscore

Sweden	65–63	Latvia

Rakvere, Estonia

7 August 2004

Boxscore

Iceland	71–68	England

Rakvere, Estonia

7 August 2004

Boxscore

Ireland	52–71	Sweden

Rakvere, Estonia

7 August 2004

Boxscore

Finland	70–97	Estonia

Rakvere, Estonia

7 August 2004

Boxscore

Latvia	71–61	Netherlands

Rakvere, Estonia

8 August 2004

Boxscore

Lithuania	76–68	Finland

Rakvere, Estonia

8 August 2004

Boxscore

Sweden	63–66	Iceland

Rakvere, Estonia

8 August 2004

Boxscore

Estonia	72–81	Latvia

Rakvere, Estonia

8 August 2004

Boxscore

Netherlands	72–68	Ireland

Rakvere, Estonia
