= 2016 FIBA U16 Women's European Championship Division B =

Tournament details
- Host country: Romania
- City: Oradea
- Dates: 5–14 August 2016
- Teams: 23 (from 1 confederation)
- Venues: 3 (in 1 host city)

Final positions
- Champions: Poland (1st title)
- Runners-up: Romania
- Third place: Netherlands

Official website
- www.fiba.basketball

The 2016 FIBA U16 Women's European Championship Division B was the 13th edition of the Division B of the European basketball championship for women's national under-16 teams. It was played in Oradea, Romania, from 5 to 14 August 2016. Poland women's national under-16 basketball team won the tournament.

== Participating teams ==
- Albania
- Austria
- Belgium ▼ (14th place, 2015 FIBA Europe Under-16 Championship for Women Division A)
- Bosnia and Herzegovina
- Bulgaria
- Cyprus
- Denmark
- England ▼ (16th place, 2015 FIBA Europe Under-16 Championship for Women Division A)
- Estonia
- Finland
- Greece
- Iceland ▲ (Winners, 2015 FIBA Europe Under-16 Championship for Women Division C)
- Ireland
- Israel
- Luxembourg
- Macedonia
- Netherlands ▼ (15th place, 2015 FIBA Europe Under-16 Championship for Women Division A)
- Norway
- Poland
- Romania
- Scotland
- Slovenia
- Ukraine

== First round ==
In the first round, the teams were drawn into four groups. The first two teams from each group advance to the quarterfinals; the third and fourth teams advance to the 9th–16th place playoffs; the other teams will play in the 17th–23rd place classification.

=== Group A ===
Pos	Team	Pld	W	L	PF	PA	PD	Pts	Qualification
1	Netherlands	5	5	0	416	228	+188	10	Quarterfinals
2	Israel	5	4	1	351	255	+96	9	Quarterfinals
3	Slovenia	5	3	2	274	282	−8	8	9th–16th place playoffs
4	Estonia	5	2	3	284	352	−68	7	9th–16th place playoffs
5	Austria	5	1	4	254	346	−92	6	17th–23rd place classification
6	Cyprus	5	0	5	204	320	−116	5	17th–23rd place classification

Source: FIBA

5 August 2016

Boxscore

Austria	42–67	Slovenia

Arena Antonio Alexe

5 August 2016

Boxscore

Cyprus	44–53	Estonia

Arena Antonio Alexe

5 August 2016

Boxscore

Israel	54–71	Netherlands

Arena Antonio Alexe

6 August 2016

Boxscore

Estonia	83–75	Austria

Arena Antonio Alexe

6 August 2016

Boxscore

Netherlands	87–49	Cyprus

Arena Antonio Alexe

6 August 2016

Boxscore

Slovenia	40–69	Israel

Arena Antonio Alexe

7 August 2016

Boxscore

Israel	76–51	Austria

P. Cosma Economic College Arena

7 August 2016

Boxscore

Cyprus	33–59	Slovenia

P. Cosma Economic College Arena

7 August 2016

Boxscore

Netherlands	91–42	Estonia

P. Cosma Economic College Arena

9 August 2016

Boxscore

Slovenia	48–89	Netherlands

P. Cosma Economic College Arena

9 August 2016

Boxscore

Austria	51–42	Cyprus

P. Cosma Economic College Arena

9 August 2016

Boxscore

Estonia	57–82	Israel

P. Cosma Economic College Arena

10 August 2016

Boxscore

Cyprus	36–70	Israel

Universitatea Gym

10 August 2016

Boxscore

Netherlands	78–35	Austria

Universitatea Gym

10 August 2016

Boxscore

Slovenia	60–49	Estonia

Universitatea Gym

=== Group B ===
Pos	Team	Pld	W	L	PF	PA	PD	Pts	Qualification
1	Greece	5	4	1	311	216	+95	9	Quarterfinals
2	Luxembourg	5	4	1	326	195	+131	9	Quarterfinals
3	Ukraine	5	3	2	253	222	+31	8	9th–16th place playoffs
4	Denmark	5	3	2	265	240	+25	8	9th–16th place playoffs
5	Iceland	5	1	4	255	262	−7	6	17th–23rd place classification
6	Albania	5	0	5	189	464	−275	5	17th–23rd place classification

Source: FIBA

5 August 2016

Boxscore

Luxembourg	60–48	Denmark

P. Cosma Economic College Arena

5 August 2016

Boxscore

Ukraine	41–54	Greece

P. Cosma Economic College Arena

5 August 2016

Boxscore

Iceland	105–38	Albania

P. Cosma Economic College Arena

6 August 2016

Boxscore

Denmark	32–48	Ukraine

P. Cosma Economic College Arena

6 August 2016

Boxscore

Albania	26–95	Luxembourg

P. Cosma Economic College Arena

6 August 2016

Boxscore

Greece	49–28	Iceland

P. Cosma Economic College Arena

7 August 2016

Boxscore

Greece	110–43	Albania

Universitatea Gym

7 August 2016

Boxscore

Ukraine	28–59	Luxembourg

Universitatea Gym

7 August 2016

Boxscore

Iceland	46–66	Denmark

Universitatea Gym

9 August 2016

Boxscore

Luxembourg	61–40	Iceland

Universitatea Gym

9 August 2016

Boxscore

Albania	41–88	Ukraine

Universitatea Gym

9 August 2016

Boxscore

Denmark	53–45	Greece

Universitatea Gym

10 August 2016

Boxscore

Greece	53–51	Luxembourg

Arena Antonio Alexe

10 August 2016

Boxscore

Iceland	36–48	Ukraine

Arena Antonio Alexe

10 August 2016

Boxscore

Denmark	66–41	Albania

Arena Antonio Alexe

=== Group C ===
Pos	Team	Pld	W	L	PF	PA	PD	Pts	Qualification
1	Finland	5	5	0	350	222	+128	10	Quarterfinals
2	Ireland	5	3	2	288	254	+34	8	Quarterfinals
3	England	5	3	2	321	262	+59	8	9th–16th place playoffs
4	Bulgaria	5	2	3	216	333	−117	7	9th–16th place playoffs
5	Bosnia and Herzegovina	5	2	3	286	295	−9	7	17th–23rd place classification
6	Scotland	5	0	5	224	319	−95	5	17th–23rd place classification

Source: FIBA

5 August 2016

Boxscore

Bosnia and Herzegovina	57–47	Scotland

Universitatea Gym

5 August 2016

Boxscore

Ireland	58–62	Finland

Universitatea Gym

5 August 2016

Boxscore

Bulgaria	45–83	England

Universitatea Gym

6 August 2016

Boxscore

Scotland	49–58	Ireland

Universitatea Gym

6 August 2016

Boxscore

England	66–56	Bosnia and Herzegovina

Universitatea Gym

6 August 2016

Boxscore

Finland	74–20	Bulgaria

Universitatea Gym

7 August 2016

Boxscore

England	75–46	Scotland

Arena Antonio Alexe

7 August 2016

Boxscore

Bulgaria	41–70	Ireland

Arena Antonio Alexe

7 August 2016

Boxscore

Bosnia and Herzegovina	56–70	Finland

Arena Antonio Alexe

9 August 2016

Boxscore

Scotland	45–48	Bulgaria

Arena Antonio Alexe

9 August 2016

Boxscore

Finland	63–51	England

Arena Antonio Alexe

9 August 2016

Boxscore

Ireland	50–56	Bosnia and Herzegovina

Arena Antonio Alexe

10 August 2016

Boxscore

Finland	81–37	Scotland

P. Cosma Economic College Arena

10 August 2016

Boxscore

Bosnia and Herzegovina	61–62	Bulgaria

P. Cosma Economic College Arena

10 August 2016

Boxscore

England	46–52	Ireland

P. Cosma Economic College Arena

=== Group D ===
Pos	Team	Pld	W	L	PF	PA	PD	Pts	Qualification
1	Poland	4	4	0	293	154	+139	8	Quarterfinals
2	Romania	4	3	1	272	157	+115	7	Quarterfinals
3	Belgium	4	2	2	240	160	+80	6	9th–16th place playoffs
4	Macedonia	4	1	3	148	279	−131	5	9th–16th place playoffs
5	Norway	4	0	4	104	307	−203	4	17th–23rd place classification

Source: FIBA

5 August 2016

Boxscore

Poland	95–21	Norway

P. Cosma Economic College Arena

5 August 2016

Boxscore

Belgium	43–56	Romania

Arena Antonio Alexe

6 August 2016

Boxscore

Romania	54–57	Poland

Arena Antonio Alexe

6 August 2016

Boxscore

Macedonia	30–63	Belgium

P. Cosma Economic College Arena

7 August 2016

Boxscore

Norway	23–73	Romania

Arena Antonio Alexe

7 August 2016

Boxscore

Poland	90–31	Macedonia

Universitatea Gym

9 August 2016

Boxscore

Belgium	48–51	Poland

Universitatea Gym

9 August 2016

Boxscore

Macedonia	53–37	Norway

P. Cosma Economic College Arena

10 August 2016

Boxscore

Norway	23–86	Belgium

Universitatea Gym

10 August 2016

Boxscore

Romania	89–34	Macedonia

Arena Antonio Alexe

== 17th–23rd place classification ==
=== Group E ===
Pos	Team	Pld	W	L	PF	PA	PD	Pts	Qualification
1	Bosnia and Herzegovina	2	2	0	133	78	+55	4	17th place match
2	Norway	2	1	1	88	115	−27	3	19th place match
3	Scotland	2	0	2	86	114	−28	2	21st place match

Source: FIBA

12 August 2016

Boxscore

Scotland	39–57	Norway

Universitatea Gym

13 August 2016

Boxscore

Norway	31–76	Bosnia and Herzegovina

Universitatea Gym

=== Playoffs ===
21st place match
E3	Scotland	47
A6	Cyprus	38
23rd place
B6	Albania

21st–23rd place semifinal
Group E
B6	Albania	43
A6	Cyprus	62

17th–23rd place quarterfinals
Group E
Group E
A5	Austria	80
B6	Albania	52
B5	Iceland	89
A6	Cyprus	44

17th–20th place semifinal
Group E
A5	Austria	46
B5	Iceland	58

17th place match
E1	Bosnia and Herzegovina	60
B5	Iceland	41
19th place match
E2	Norway	48
A5	Austria	32

==== 17th–23rd place quarterfinals ====
12 August 2016

Boxscore

Scotland	39–57	Norway

Universitatea Gym

12 August 2016

Boxscore

Austria	80–52	Albania

Universitatea Gym

==== 21st–23rd place semifinal ====
13 August 2016

Boxscore

Albania	43–62	Cyprus

Universitatea Gym

==== 17th–20th place semifinal ====
13 August 2016

Boxscore

Austria	46–58	Iceland

Universitatea Gym

==== 21st place match ====
14 August 2016

Boxscore

Scotland	47–38	Cyprus

Universitatea Gym

==== 19th place match ====
14 August 2016

Boxscore

Norway	48–32	Austria

Universitatea Gym

==== 17th place match ====
14 August 2016

Boxscore

Bosnia and Herzegovina	60–41	Iceland

Universitatea Gym

== 9th–16th place playoffs ==
13th place match
C4	Bulgaria	57
B3	Ukraine	56
15th place match
B4	Denmark	48
D4	Macedonia	52

13th–16th place semifinals
B4	Denmark	53
C4	Bulgaria	59
B3	Ukraine	65
D4	Macedonia	37

9th–16th place quarterfinals
A3	Slovenia	58
B4	Denmark	49
D3	Belgium	99
C4	Bulgaria	42
B3	Ukraine	47
A4	Estonia	76
C3	England	64
D4	Macedonia	56

9th–12th place semifinals
A3	Slovenia	36
D3	Belgium	80
A4	Estonia	62
C3	England	70

9th place match
D3	Belgium	76
C3	England	34
11th place match
A3	Slovenia	59
A4	Estonia	75

=== 9th–16th place quarterfinals ===
12 August 2016

Boxscore

Slovenia	58–49	Denmark

P. Cosma Economic College Arena

12 August 2016

Boxscore

Belgium	99–42	Bulgaria

P. Cosma Economic College Arena

12 August 2016

Boxscore

Ukraine	47–76	Estonia

P. Cosma Economic College Arena

12 August 2016

Boxscore

England	64–56	Macedonia

P. Cosma Economic College Arena

=== 13th–16th place semifinals ===
13 August 2016

Boxscore

Denmark	53–59	Bulgaria

P. Cosma Economic College Arena

13 August 2016

Boxscore

Ukraine	65–37	Macedonia

P. Cosma Economic College Arena

=== 9th–12th place semifinals ===
13 August 2016

Boxscore

Slovenia	36–80	Belgium

P. Cosma Economic College Arena

13 August 2016

Boxscore

Estonia	62–70	England

P. Cosma Economic College Arena

=== 15th place match ===
14 August 2016

Boxscore

Denmark	48–52	Macedonia

P. Cosma Economic College Arena

=== 13th place match ===
14 August 2016

Boxscore

Bulgaria	57–56	Ukraine

P. Cosma Economic College Arena

=== 11th place match ===
14 August 2016

Boxscore

Slovenia	59–75	Estonia

P. Cosma Economic College Arena

=== 9th place match ===
14 August 2016

Boxscore

Belgium	76–34	England

P. Cosma Economic College Arena

== Championship playoffs ==
5th place match
C2	Ireland	50
B1	Greece	57
7th place match
B2	Luxembourg	25
C1	Finland	69

5th–8th place semifinals
B2	Luxembourg	38
C2	Ireland	46
B1	Greece	47
C1	Finland	44

Quarterfinals
A1	Netherlands	89
B2	Luxembourg	45
D1	Poland	60
C2	Ireland	53
B1	Greece	51
A2	Israel	56
C1	Finland	53
D2	Romania	55

Semifinals
A1	Netherlands	59
D1	Poland	66
A2	Israel	52
D2	Romania	63

Final
D1	Poland	66
D2	Romania	52
3rd place match
A1	Netherlands	50
A2	Israel	44

=== Quarterfinals ===
12 August 2016

Boxscore

Netherlands	89–45	Luxembourg

Arena Antonio Alexe

12 August 2016

Boxscore

Poland	60–53	Ireland

Arena Antonio Alexe

12 August 2016

Boxscore

Finland	53–55	Romania

Arena Antonio Alexe

12 August 2016

Boxscore

Greece	51–56	Israel

Arena Antonio Alexe

=== 5th–8th place semifinals ===
13 August 2016

Boxscore

Luxembourg	38–46	Ireland

Arena Antonio Alexe

13 August 2016

Boxscore

Greece	47–44	Finland

Arena Antonio Alexe

=== Semifinals ===
13 August 2016

Boxscore

Israel	52–63	Romania

Arena Antonio Alexe

13 August 2016

Boxscore

Netherlands	59–66	Poland

Arena Antonio Alexe

=== 7th place match ===
14 August 2016

Boxscore

Luxembourg	25–69	Finland

Arena Antonio Alexe

=== 5th place match ===
14 August 2016

Boxscore

Ireland	50–57	Greece

Arena Antonio Alexe

=== 3rd place match ===
14 August 2016

Boxscore

Netherlands	50–44	Israel

Arena Antonio Alexe

=== Final ===
14 August 2016

Boxscore

Poland	66–52	Romania

Arena Antonio Alexe

== Final standings ==
Rank	Team
1st place, gold medalist(s)	Poland
2nd place, silver medalist(s)	Romania
3rd place, bronze medalist(s)	Netherlands
4	Israel
5	Greece
6	Ireland
7	Finland
8	Luxembourg
9	Belgium
10	England
11	Estonia
12	Slovenia
13	Bulgaria
14	Ukraine
15	Macedonia
16	Denmark
17	Bosnia and Herzegovina
18	Iceland
19	Norway
20	Austria
21	Scotland
22	Cyprus
23	Albania

Promoted to the 2017 FIBA U16 Women's European Championship Division A
