= 2014 FIBA Europe Under-16 Championship for Women Division B =

Tournament details
- Host country: Estonia
- City: Tallinn
- Dates: 31 July – 10 August 2014
- Teams: 17 (from 1 confederation)
- Venue(s): 2 (in 1 host city)

Final positions
- Champions: Germany (2nd title)
- Runners-up: England
- Third place: Netherlands

Official website
- www.fibaeurope.com

The 2014 FIBA Europe Under-16 Championship for Women Division B was the 11th edition of the Division B of the European basketball championship for women's national under-16 teams. It was played in Tallinn, Estonia, from 31 July to 10 August 2014. Germany women's national under-16 basketball team won the tournament.

== Participating teams ==
- Austria
- Bulgaria ▼ (16th place, 2013 FIBA Europe Under-16 Championship for Women Division A)
- England
- Estonia
- Finland
- Germany
- Ireland
- Israel
- Lithuania ▼ (15th place, 2013 FIBA Europe Under-16 Championship for Women Division A)
- Luxembourg
- Netherlands ▼ (14th place, 2013 FIBA Europe Under-16 Championship for Women Division A)
- Norway
- Poland
- Romania
- Slovenia
- Switzerland
- Ukraine

== First round ==
In the first round, the teams were drawn into four groups. The first two teams from each group will advance to the Quarterfinal Groups E and F and the other teams will advance to the 9th–17th place classification (Groups G, H and I).

=== Group A ===
Pos	Team	Pld	W	L	PF	PA	PD	Pts	Qualification
1	Poland	3	3	0	232	128	+104	6	1st–8th place classification
2	Finland	3	2	1	191	187	+4	5	1st–8th place classification
3	Ireland	3	1	2	142	201	−59	4	9th–17th place classification
4	Romania	3	0	3	145	194	−49	3	9th–17th place classification

Source: FIBA Archive

=== Group B ===
Pos	Team	Pld	W	L	PF	PA	PD	Pts	Qualification
1	England	3	3	0	189	163	+26	6	1st–8th place classification
2	Netherlands	3	2	1	214	145	+69	5	1st–8th place classification
3	Israel	3	1	2	177	188	−11	4	9th–17th place classification
4	Norway	3	0	3	119	203	−84	3	9th–17th place classification

Source: FIBA Archive

=== Group C ===
Pos	Team	Pld	W	L	PF	PA	PD	Pts	Qualification
1	Ukraine	3	3	0	194	145	+49	6	1st–8th place classification
2	Bulgaria	3	2	1	191	174	+17	5	1st–8th place classification
3	Luxembourg	3	1	2	155	179	−24	4	9th–17th place classification
4	Switzerland	3	0	3	157	199	−42	3	9th–17th place classification

Source: FIBA Archive

=== Group D ===
Pos	Team	Pld	W	L	PF	PA	PD	Pts	Qualification
1	Germany	4	4	0	276	151	+125	8	1st–8th place classification
2	Slovenia	4	3	1	260	185	+75	7	1st–8th place classification
3	Lithuania	4	2	2	259	195	+64	6	9th–17th place classification
4	Estonia	4	1	3	155	212	−57	5	9th–17th place classification
5	Austria	4	0	4	120	327	−207	4	9th–17th place classification

Source: FIBA Archive

== 1st–8th place classification ==
=== Group E ===
Pos	Team	Pld	W	L	PF	PA	PD	Pts	Qualification
1	England	3	3	0	197	176	+21	6	Semifinal
2	Netherlands	3	2	1	211	187	+24	5	Semifinal
3	Poland	3	1	2	201	189	+12	4	5th–8th place playoffs
4	Finland	3	0	3	175	232	−57	3	5th–8th place playoffs

Source: FIBA Archive

=== Group F ===
Pos	Team	Pld	W	L	PF	PA	PD	Pts	Qualification
1	Germany	3	3	0	200	138	+62	6	Semifinal
2	Slovenia	3	2	1	153	152	+1	5	Semifinal
3	Ukraine	3	1	2	154	182	−28	4	5th–8th place playoffs
4	Bulgaria	3	0	3	155	190	−35	3	5th–8th place playoffs

Source: FIBA Archive

== 9th–17th place classification ==
=== Group G ===
Pos	Team	Pld	W	L	PF	PA	PD	Pts	Qualification
1	Ireland	2	2	0	126	80	+46	4	9th–11th place classification
2	Norway	2	1	1	98	104	−6	3	12th–14th place classification
3	Austria	2	0	2	68	108	−40	2	15th–17th place classification

Source: FIBA Archive

=== Group H ===
Pos	Team	Pld	W	L	PF	PA	PD	Pts	Qualification
1	Switzerland	2	2	0	102	86	+16	4	9th–11th place classification
2	Israel	2	1	1	108	102	+6	3	12th–14th place classification
3	Estonia	2	0	2	99	121	−22	2	15th–17th place classification

Source: FIBA Archive

=== Group I ===
Pos	Team	Pld	W	L	PF	PA	PD	Pts	Qualification
1	Lithuania	2	2	0	107	101	+6	4	9th–11th place classification
2	Romania	2	1	1	122	117	+5	3	12th–14th place classification
3	Luxembourg	2	0	2	109	120	−11	2	15th–17th place classification

Source: FIBA Archive

== 15th–17th place classification ==
Pos	Team	Pld	W	L	PF	PA	PD	Pts
15	Estonia	2	2	0	107	94	+13	4
16	Austria	2	1	1	102	105	−3	3
17	Luxembourg	2	0	2	99	109	−10	2

Source: FIBA Archive

== 12th–14th place classification ==
Pos	Team	Pld	W	L	PF	PA	PD	Pts
12	Israel	2	2	0	143	70	+73	4
13	Romania	2	1	1	123	112	+11	3
14	Norway	2	0	2	66	150	−84	2

Source: FIBA Archive

== 9th–11th place classification ==
Pos	Team	Pld	W	L	PF	PA	PD	Pts
9	Lithuania	2	2	0	125	89	+36	4
10	Switzerland	2	1	1	89	114	−25	3
11	Ireland	2	0	2	88	99	−11	2

Source: FIBA Archive

== 5th–8th place playoffs ==
5th–8th place semifinals
E3	Poland	66
F4	Bulgaria	61
F3	Ukraine	55
E4	Finland	73

5th place match
E3	Poland	61
E4	Finland	53
7th place match
F4	Bulgaria	53
E4	Ukraine	31

== Championship playoffs ==
Semifinals
E1	England	54
F2	Slovenia	51
F1	Germany	57
E2	Netherlands	38

Finals
E1	England	54
F1	Germany	68
3rd place match
F2	Slovenia	44
E2	Netherlands	54

== Final standings ==
Promoted to the 2015 FIBA Europe Under-16 Championship for Women Division A

Rank	Team
1st place, gold medalist(s)	Germany
2nd place, silver medalist(s)	England
3rd place, bronze medalist(s)	Netherlands
4	Slovenia
5	Poland
6	Finland
7	Bulgaria
8	Ukraine
9	Lithuania
10	Switzerland
11	Ireland
12	Israel
13	Romania
14	Norway
15	Estonia
16	Austria
17	Luxembourg
