= Ireland women's national under-16 basketball team =

Ireland
- FIBA zone: FIBA Europe
- National federation: Basketball Ireland

U17 World Cup
- Appearances: None

U16 EuroBasket
- Appearances: None

U16 EuroBasket Division B
- Appearances: 20
- Medals: None

The Ireland women's national under-16 basketball team is a national basketball team of the Island of Ireland, administered by Basketball Ireland. It represents the country in international under-16 women's basketball competitions, including FIBA U16 Women's EuroBasket Division B championships and Four Nations competitions.

== FIBA U16 Women's EuroBasket participations ==
Year	Result in Division B
2004	17th
2005	8th
2006	13th
2007	10th
2008	11th
2009	12th
2010	12th
2011	15th
2013	15th
2014	11th

Year	Result in Division B
2015	7th
2016	6th
2017	10th
2018	14th
2019	12th
2022	15th
2023	14th
2024	10th
2025	17th
2026	Rank 6 trio

== See also ==
- Ireland women's national basketball team
- Ireland women's national under-18 basketball team
- Ireland men's national under-16 basketball team
