= Bosnia and Herzegovina women's national under-16 basketball team =

Bosnia and Herzegovina
- FIBA zone: FIBA Europe
- National federation: Košarkaški savez Bosne i Hercegovine

U17 World Cup
- Appearances: None

U16 EuroBasket
- Appearances: None

U16 EuroBasket Division B
- Appearances: 15
- Medals: Bronze: 1 (2004)
Home	Away

The Bosnia and Herzegovina women's national under-16 basketball team is a national basketball team of Bosnia and Herzegovina, administered by the Basketball Federation of Bosnia and Herzegovina. It represents the country in international under-16 women's basketball competitions.

== FIBA U16 Women's EuroBasket participations ==
Year	Result in Division B
2004	3rd/4th
2005	13th
2006	6th
2007	6th
2008	15th
2009	6th
2016	17th
2017	8th

Year	Result in Division B
2018	20th
2019	17th
2022	7th
2023	17th
2024	13th
2025	8th
2026	Rank 6 trio

== See also ==
- Bosnia and Herzegovina women's national basketball team
- Bosnia and Herzegovina women's national under-20 basketball team
- Bosnia and Herzegovina women's national under-18 basketball team
- Bosnia and Herzegovina men's national under-16 and under-17 basketball team
