= Romania women's national under-16 basketball team =

Romania
- FIBA zone: FIBA Europe
- National federation: Romanian Basketball Federation

U17 World Cup
- Appearances: None

U16 EuroBasket
- Appearances: 13
- Medals: Silver: 1 (1989)

U16 EuroBasket Division B
- Appearances: 18
- Medals: Gold: 1 (2024); Silver: 1 (2016); Bronze: 2 (2006, 2008)
Home	Away

The Romania women's national under-16 basketball team is a national basketball team of Romania, administered by the Romanian Basketball Federation. It represents the country in international under-16 women's basketball competitions.

== FIBA U16 Women's EuroBasket participations ==
Year	Division A	Division B
1976	8th	
1978	4th	
1980	4th	
1984	5th	
1985	5th	
1987	5th	
1989	2nd place, silver medalist(s)	
1991	11th	
1997	12th	
1999	12th	
2004		9th/10th
2005		5th
2006		3rd place, bronze medalist(s)
2007		12th
2008		3rd place, bronze medalist(s)
2009		7th

Year	Division A	Division B
2010		8th
2011		8th
2012		14th
2013		14th
2014		13th
2015		5th
2016		2nd place, silver medalist(s)
2017	16th	
2018		6th
2019		15th
2022		14th
2023		8th
2024		1st place, gold medalist(s)
2025	9th	
2026	15th	

== See also ==
- Romania women's national basketball team
- Romania women's national under-18 basketball team
- Romania men's national under-16 basketball team
