= 2024 FIBA U16 Women's EuroBasket Division B =

International basketball tournament

Tournament details
- Host country: Turkey
- City: Konya
- Dates: 15–24 August 2024
- Teams: 20 (from 1 confederation)
- Venues: 2 (in 1 host city)

Final positions
- Champions: Romania (1st title)
- Runners-up: Czechia
- Third place: Great Britain
- Fourth place: Turkey

Tournament statistics
- Games played: 70
- Attendance: 9,330 (133 per game)

Official website
- www.fiba.basketball

The 2024 FIBA U16 Women's EuroBasket Division B was the 19th edition of the Division B of the European basketball championship for women's under-16 national teams. The tournament was played in Konya, Turkey, from 15 to 24 August 2024.

== Participating teams ==
- Austria
- Bosnia and Herzegovina
- Bulgaria
- Czech Republic ▼ (14th place, 2023 FIBA U16 Women's European Championship Division A)
- Denmark
- Estonia
- Great Britain
- Iceland
- Ireland
- Kosovo
- Lithuania
- Luxembourg
- Netherlands
- Norway
- Portugal ▼ (16th place, 2023 FIBA U16 Women's European Championship Division A)
- Romania
- Slovakia
- Switzerland
- Turkey ▼ (15th place, 2023 FIBA U16 Women's European Championship Division A)
- Ukraine

== First round ==
The draw of the first round was held on 6 February 2024 in Freising, Germany.

In the first round, the teams were drawn into four groups of five. The first two teams from each group advanced to the quarterfinals; the third and fourth teams advanced to the 9th–16th place playoffs; the last teams advanced to the 17th–20th place classification.

All times are local (Turkey Time – UTC+3).

=== Group A ===
| Pos | Team | Pld | W | L | PF | PA | PD | Pts | Qualification |
|---|---|---|---|---|---|---|---|---|---|
| 1 | Denmark | 4 | 3 | 1 | 308 | 206 | +102 | 7 (Note: Head-to-head point difference: Denmark +14, Romania −5, Portugal −9) | Quarterfinals |
| 2 | Romania | 4 | 3 | 1 | 303 | 227 | +76 | 7 | Quarterfinals |
| 3 | Portugal | 4 | 3 | 1 | 280 | 212 | +68 | 7 | 9th–16th place playoffs |
| 4 | Norway | 4 | 1 | 3 | 169 | 307 | −138 | 5 | 9th–16th place playoffs |
| 5 | Switzerland | 4 | 0 | 4 | 192 | 300 | −108 | 4 | 17th–20th place classification |

Source: FIBA
Notes:

15 August 2024
14:00

Boxscore

| Switzerland | 42–68 | Portugal |
Scoring by quarter: 8–14, 13–29, 9–16, 12–9
| Pts: Popovic 11; Rebs: Srdanovic 7 Asts: Srdanovic 6 | | Pts: Monteiro 19; Rebs: Monteiro 8 Asts: Monteiro 5 |

Konya Sports Complex
Attendance: 100
Referees: Stefan Zdravkovic (SRB), Hasan Bajgoric (BIH), Monika Mincheva (BUL)

15 August 2024
16:30

Boxscore

| Norway | 26–93 | Romania |
Scoring by quarter: 7–27, 4–13, 11–30, 4–23
| Pts: Rotherud 11; Rebs: Svenningsen 11; Asts: Tveiten 4 | | Pts: Babadac 17; Rebs: Valea 8 Asts: Velcea, Calapis 4 |

Konya Sports Complex
Attendance: 100
Referees: Janis Rozenbergs (LAT), Emma Perry (IRL), Volodymyr Pediev (UKR)

16 August 2024
14:00

Boxscore

| Denmark | 86–41 | Norway |
Scoring by quarter: 19–10, 14–19, 34–8, 19–4
| Pts: Reumert 22; Rebs: Petersen 9 Asts: Douglas-Pedersen 6 | | Pts: Hjelle 12; Rebs: Svenningsen 6 Asts: Hjelle 5 |

Konya Sports Complex II
Attendance: 50
Referees: Veronika Vavrova (CZE), Hasan Bajgoric (BIH), Volodymyr Pediev (UKR)

16 August 2024
16:30

Boxscore

| Romania | 65–51 | Switzerland |
Scoring by quarter: 18–10, 17–13, 12–14, 18–14
| Pts: Velcea 23; Rebs: Ilies, Valea 8 Asts: Danciulescu 7 | | Pts: Corthay 19; Rebs: Srdanovic 11; Asts: Srdanovic 5 |

Konya Sports Complex II
Attendance: 50
Referees: Roko Hordov (CRO), Marija Ciric (SRB), Mbaye Seye (SEN)

17 August 2024
14:00

Boxscore

| Portugal | 76–87 | Romania |
Scoring by quarter: 18–17, 24–17, 14–29, 20–24
| Pts: C. Silva 26; Rebs: Palma 8 Asts: C. Silva 6 | | Pts: Velcea 24; Rebs: Velcea 7 Asts: Velcea 5 |

Konya Sports Complex II
Attendance: 50
Referees: Stefan Zdravkovic (SRB), Claudia Ferrara (ITA), Eduard Uhrin (SVK)

17 August 2024
19:00

Boxscore

| Switzerland | 48–91 | Denmark |
Scoring by quarter: 18–26, 11–22, 10–19, 9–24
| Pts: Srdanovic 14; Rebs: Srdanovic 9 Asts: Lanfranchi Rio, Corthay 3 | | Pts: Norregaard-Laursen 19; Rebs: Norregaard-Laursen, Marion 10; Asts: Four players 4 |

Konya Sports Complex II
Attendance: 60
Referees: Andžej Urbanovič (LTU), Hendrik Laas (EST), Sarty Nghixulifwa (NAM)

19 August 2024
14:00

Boxscore

| Norway | 76–51 | Switzerland |
Scoring by quarter: 16–12, 22–9, 21–18, 17–12
| Pts: Hjelle 19; Rebs: Sanford, Rotherud 11; Asts: Hjelle 6 | | Pts: Srdanovic 11; Rebs: Clavel 7 Asts: Corthay 6 |

Konya Sports Complex
Attendance: 15
Referees: Duhan Köyici (TUR), Marija Ciric (SRB), Mbaye Seye (SEN)

19 August 2024
16:30

Boxscore

| Denmark | 57–59 | Portugal |
Scoring by quarter: 13–15, 18–12, 15–9, 11–23
| Pts: Reumert 21; Rebs: Marion 20; Asts: Reumert 4 | | Pts: C. Silva 19; Rebs: C. Silva 12; Asts: Alves 4 |

Konya Sports Complex II
Attendance: 100
Referees: Andžej Urbanovič (LTU), Stefán Kristinsson (ISL), Elldin Uglari (KOS)

20 August 2024
14:00

Boxscore

| Romania | 58–74 | Denmark |
Scoring by quarter: 7–20, 25–23, 16–11, 10–20
| Pts: Velcea 21; Rebs: Avram 9 Asts: Velcea 7 | | Pts: Norregaard-Laursen 27; Rebs: Marion 15; Asts: Madsen, Marion 6 |

Konya Sports Complex
Attendance: 40
Referees: Veronika Vavrova (CZE), Rúben Györfy (HUN), Marija Ciric (SRB)

20 August 2024
16:30

Boxscore

| Portugal | 77–26 | Norway |
Scoring by quarter: 23–4, 19–9, 26–5, 9–8
| Pts: C. Silva 13; Rebs: Santos 8 Asts: Three players 5 | | Pts: Sanford 9 Rebs: Tveiten 8 Asts: Four players 1 |

Konya Sports Complex II
Attendance: 50
Referees: Cynthia Le Quilliec (FRA), Monika Mincheva (BUL), Ruslan Khaligov (AZE)

=== Group B ===
| Pos | Team | Pld | W | L | PF | PA | PD | Pts | Qualification |
|---|---|---|---|---|---|---|---|---|---|
| 1 | Lithuania | 4 | 4 | 0 | 321 | 221 | +100 | 8 | Quarterfinals |
| 2 | Great Britain | 4 | 3 | 1 | 327 | 230 | +97 | 7 | Quarterfinals |
| 3 | Bosnia and Herzegovina | 4 | 2 | 2 | 225 | 323 | −98 | 6 | 9th–16th place playoffs |
| 4 | Iceland | 4 | 1 | 3 | 268 | 309 | −41 | 5 | 9th–16th place playoffs |
| 5 | Estonia | 4 | 0 | 4 | 248 | 306 | −58 | 4 | 17th–20th place classification |

Source: FIBA

15 August 2024
14:00

Boxscore

| Estonia | 58–82 | Lithuania |
Scoring by quarter: 10–22, 14–25, 12–19, 22–16
| Pts: Aller 19; Rebs: Lesina 6 Asts: Grünmann 5 | | Pts: Mockeviciute 20; Rebs: Galvanauskaite 16; Asts: Pupelyte 5 |

Konya Sports Complex II
Attendance: 25
Referees: Duhan Köyici (TUR), Claudia Ferrara (ITA), Hugo Blanco Marques Da Silva (POR)

15 August 2024
16:30

Boxscore

| Bosnia and Herzegovina | 74–72 | Iceland |
Scoring by quarter: 22–8, 28–13, 14–25, 10–26
| Pts: Bekic 18; Rebs: Talic 12; Asts: Merdanovic 5 | | Pts: Agnarsdóttir 13; Rebs: Steingrímsdóttir 10; Asts: Steingrímsdóttir 8 |

Konya Sports Complex II
Attendance: 50
Referees: Ioannis Tiganis (GRE), Cynthia Le Quilliec (FRA), Eduard Uhrin (SVK)

16 August 2024
14:00

Boxscore

| Great Britain | 105–34 | Bosnia and Herzegovina |
Scoring by quarter: 24–20, 24–2, 35–8, 22–4
| Pts: Thompson 27; Rebs: Oboavwoduo, Vella 8 Asts: Thompson, Briggs 4 | | Pts: Sehovic 8 Rebs: Talic, Sehovic 6 Asts: Bekic, Merdanovic 3 |

Konya Sports Complex
Attendance: 75
Referees: Michal Chrakowiecki (POL), Cynthia Le Quilliec (FRA), Amalia Marchiş (ROU)

16 August 2024
16:30

Boxscore

| Iceland | 79–76 | Estonia |
Scoring by quarter: 15–15, 15–23, 23–18, 26–20
| Pts: Steingrimsdottir 19; Rebs: Logadottir 11; Asts: Steingrimsdottir 8 | | Pts: Grunmann 22; Rebs: Ristimets 11; Asts: Grunmann 5 |

Konya Sports Complex
Attendance: 50
Referees: Janis Rozenbergs (LAT), Alexander Egil Reiertsen (NOR), Monika Mincheva (BUL)

17 August 2024
16:30

Boxscore

| Estonia | 51–77 | Great Britain |
Scoring by quarter: 12–12, 17–20, 13–21, 9–24
| Pts: Grunmann 12; Rebs: Lesina, Ristimets 10; Asts: Grunmann 4 | | Pts: Oboavwoduo 31; Rebs: Vella 12; Asts: Thompson 4 |

Konya Sports Complex
Attendance: 70
Referees: Roko Hordov (CRO), Marija Ciric (SRB), Ruslan Khaligov (AZE)

17 August 2024
21:30

Boxscore

| Lithuania | 77–51 | Iceland |
Scoring by quarter: 16–17, 21–11, 24–9, 16–14
| Pts: Mockeviciute 22; Rebs: Galvanauskaite 12; Asts: Pupelyte 5 | | Pts: Logadottir 10; Rebs: Ingadottir, Logadottir 7 Asts: Jonasdottir 4 |

Konya Sports Complex
Attendance: 100
Referees: Veronika Vavrova (CZE), Jurgen Muho (LUX), Alexander Egil Reiertsen (NOR)

19 August 2024
14:00

Boxscore

| Bosnia and Herzegovina | 68–63 | Estonia |
Scoring by quarter: 15–19, 24–12, 17–16, 12–16
| Pts: Sehovic 18; Rebs: Talic 13; Asts: Four players 2 | | Pts: Grunmann 15; Rebs: Veisberg 6 Asts: Aller, Grunmann 3 |

Konya Sports Complex II
Attendance: 50
Referees: Rúben Györfy (HUN), Claudia Ferrara (ITA), Ileana Maria Dragoi (ROU)

19 August 2024
19:00

Boxscore

| Great Britain | 63–79 | Lithuania |
Scoring by quarter: 20–12, 9–18, 23–19, 11–30
| Pts: Thompson 26; Rebs: Vella 10; Asts: Rugette 3 | | Pts: Mockeviciute 24; Rebs: Galvanauskaite 18; Asts: Pupelyte, Mockeviciute 6 |

Konya Sports Complex II
Attendance: 75
Referees: Stefan Zdravkovic (SRB), Irene Frosolini (ITA), Michal Chrakowiecki (POL)

20 August 2024
14:00

Boxscore

| Iceland | 66–82 | Great Britain |
Scoring by quarter: 21–20, 19–15, 19–11, 7–36
| Pts: Steingrimsdottir 18; Rebs: Ingadottir 10; Asts: Steingrimsdottir 6 | | Pts: Thompson 28; Rebs: Briggs 10; Asts: Vella 6 |

Konya Sports Complex II
Attendance: 100
Referees: Duhan Köyici (TUR), Alexander Egil Reiertsen (NOR), Sarty Nghixulifwa (NAM)

20 August 2024
21:30

Boxscore

| Lithuania | 83–49 | Bosnia and Herzegovina |
Scoring by quarter: 17–11, 25–11, 21–15, 20–12
| Pts: Mockeviciute 12; Rebs: Three players 7 Asts: Griskute 7 | | Pts: Bekic 18; Rebs: Bekic 8 Asts: Merdanovic 3 |

Konya Sports Complex II
Attendance: 80
Referees: Ioannis Tiganis (GRE), Elldin Uglari (KOS), Volodymyr Pediev (UKR)

=== Group C ===
| Pos | Team | Pld | W | L | PF | PA | PD | Pts | Qualification |
|---|---|---|---|---|---|---|---|---|---|
| 1 | Turkey | 4 | 4 | 0 | 322 | 184 | +138 | 8 | Quarterfinals |
| 2 | Slovakia | 4 | 3 | 1 | 262 | 223 | +39 | 7 | Quarterfinals |
| 3 | Ireland | 4 | 2 | 2 | 269 | 188 | +81 | 6 | 9th–16th place playoffs |
| 4 | Ukraine | 4 | 1 | 3 | 211 | 273 | −62 | 5 | 9th–16th place playoffs |
| 5 | Kosovo | 4 | 0 | 4 | 167 | 363 | −196 | 4 | 17th–20th place classification |

Source: FIBA

15 August 2024
19:00

Boxscore

| Kosovo | 45–105 | Turkey |
Scoring by quarter: 10–19, 6–31, 13–26, 16–29
| Pts: Gashi 15; Rebs: Hoti 12; Asts: Three players 2 | | Pts: Alkaya 19; Rebs: Demirer 11; Asts: Demir 7 |

Konya Sports Complex
Attendance: 250
Referees: Veronika Vavrova (CZE), Rúben Györfy (HUN), Hendrik Laas (EST)

15 August 2024
21:30

Boxscore

| Ireland | 67–30 | Ukraine |
Scoring by quarter: 14–7, 24–3, 11–11, 18–9
| Pts: Donnelly 11; Rebs: Summers 8 Asts: Booth 5 | | Pts: Do. Murzova 7 Rebs: Kolomiiets, Havrylchyk 8 Asts: Six players 1 |

Konya Sports Complex
Attendance: 55
Referees: Amalia Marchiş (ROU), Jurgen Muho (LUX), Stefán Kristinsson (ISL)

16 August 2024
19:00

Boxscore

| Ukraine | 82–52 | Kosovo |
Scoring by quarter: 23–12, 22–17, 17–10, 20–13
| Pts: Anisimova 18; Rebs: Do. Murzova 5 Asts: Four players 3 | | Pts: Gashi 14; Rebs: Muzliukaj 6 Asts: Goçaj 4 |

Konya Sports Complex II
Attendance: 45
Referees: Josh Bowe (GBR), Hendrik Laas (EST), Sarty Nghixulifwa (NAM)

16 August 2024
21:30

Boxscore

| Slovakia | 63–60 | Ireland |
Scoring by quarter: 18–17, 13–12, 14–20, 18–11
| Pts: Oravcova 14; Rebs: Kovacsova 6 Asts: Hudecova 6 | | Pts: Walsh 13; Rebs: Donnelly, Purtill 6 Asts: Three players 3 |

Konya Sports Complex II
Attendance: 40
Referees: Stefan Zdravkovic (SRB), Amalia Marchiş (ROU), Hugo Blanco Marques Da Silva (POR)

17 August 2024
16:30

Boxscore

| Kosovo | 36–84 | Slovakia |
Scoring by quarter: 7–18, 5–25, 11–19, 13–22
| Pts: Gashi 11; Rebs: Goçaj 9 Asts: Gashi 4 | | Pts: Nedielkova 22; Rebs: Koristova 10; Asts: Koristova 6 |

Konya Sports Complex II
Attendance: 25
Referees: Michal Chrakowiecki (POL), Irene Frosolini (ITA), Mbaye Seye (SEN)

17 August 2024
19:00

Boxscore

| Turkey | 84–44 | Ukraine |
Scoring by quarter: 24–12, 25–15, 18–12, 17–5
| Pts: Secerlioglu 15; Rebs: Demirer 6 Asts: Cinar 6 | | Pts: Do. Murzova 13; Rebs: Havrylchyk 8 Asts: Havrylchyk 3 |

Konya Sports Complex
Attendance: 400
Referees: Janis Rozenbergs (LAT), Cynthia Le Quilliec (FRA), Hugo Blanco Marques Da Silva (POR)

19 August 2024
16:30

Boxscore

| Ireland | 92–34 | Kosovo |
Scoring by quarter: 9–15, 29–12, 28–3, 26–4
| Pts: Teahan 16; Rebs: Kyamagero, Behan 8 Asts: Farrington 5 | | Pts: Hoti 15; Rebs: Gashi 12; Asts: Goçaj 6 |

Konya Sports Complex
Attendance: 55
Referees: Hendrik Laas (EST), Monika Mincheva (BUL), Sarty Nghixulifwa (NAM)

19 August 2024
19:00

Boxscore

| Slovakia | 45–72 | Turkey |
Scoring by quarter: 15–14, 13–16, 10–27, 7–15
| Pts: Koristova 9 Rebs: Kovacsova 10; Asts: Hudecova 4 | | Pts: Demirer 14; Rebs: Sahin 14; Asts: Sel 8 |

Konya Sports Complex
Attendance: 300
Referees: Josh Bowe (GBR), Alexander Egil Reiertsen (NOR), Ioannis Tiganis (GRE)

20 August 2024
19:00

Boxscore

| Turkey | 61–50 | Ireland |
Scoring by quarter: 16–12, 13–11, 16–12, 16–15
| Pts: Alkaya 13; Rebs: Sahin 14; Asts: Demir 5 | | Pts: Donnelly 14; Rebs: Teahan 9 Asts: Three players 2 |

Konya Sports Complex
Attendance: 350
Referees: Andžej Urbanovič (LTU), Jurgen Muho (LUX), Claudia Ferrara (ITA)

20 August 2024
21:30

Boxscore

| Ukraine | 55–70 | Slovakia |
Scoring by quarter: 11–16, 14–18, 15–22, 15–14
| Pts: Do. Murzova 14; Rebs: Havrylchyk 9 Asts: Podoliako 3 | | Pts: Nedielkova 12; Rebs: Duhanova 7 Asts: Hudecova 4 |

Konya Sports Complex II
Attendance: 50
Referees: Hasan Bajgoric (BIH), Michal Chrakowiecki (POL), Ileana Maria Dragoi (ROU)

=== Group D ===
| Pos | Team | Pld | W | L | PF | PA | PD | Pts | Qualification |
|---|---|---|---|---|---|---|---|---|---|
| 1 | Czechia | 4 | 4 | 0 | 316 | 161 | +155 | 8 | Quarterfinals |
| 2 | Austria | 4 | 2 | 2 | 246 | 278 | −32 | 6 (Note: Head-to-head: Austria 68–65 Netherlands) | Quarterfinals |
| 3 | Netherlands | 4 | 2 | 2 | 257 | 213 | +44 | 6 | 9th–16th place playoffs |
| 4 | Bulgaria | 4 | 1 | 3 | 233 | 294 | −61 | 5 (Note: Head-to-head: Bulgaria 82–49 Luxembourg) | 9th–16th place playoffs |
| 5 | Luxembourg | 4 | 1 | 3 | 195 | 301 | −106 | 5 | 17th–20th place classification |

Source: FIBA
Notes:

15 August 2024
19:00

Boxscore

| Luxembourg | 37–84 | Czechia |
Scoring by quarter: 6–24, 11–24, 10–19, 10–17
| Pts: Liska 15; Rebs: Missavage 5 Asts: Guedes 3 | | Pts: Taušová, Běláčová 13; Rebs: Dittrichová 9 Asts: Holaňová 5 |

Konya Sports Complex II
Attendance: 20
Referees: Roko Hordov (CRO), Irene Frosolini (ITA), Elldin Uglari (KOS)

15 August 2024
21:30

Boxscore

| Austria | 68–66 | Netherlands |
Scoring by quarter: 15–18, 22–17, 21–11, 10–20
| Pts: Kunert 15; Rebs: Kuranovic 6 Asts: Mayr 5 | | Pts: Lieverst 31; Rebs: Reijnen 8 Asts: Lieverst 4 |

Konya Sports Complex II
Attendance: 50
Referees: Josh Bowe (GBR), Ileana Maria Dragoi (ROU), Ruslan Khaligov (AZE)

16 August 2024
19:00

Boxscore

| Netherlands | 83–39 | Luxembourg |
Scoring by quarter: 15–8, 22–12, 17–9, 29–10
| Pts: Lieverst 16; Rebs: Lieverst 11; Asts: van Duijn 6 | | Pts: Wies, Missavage 10; Rebs: von Arx 6 Asts: von Arx 5 |

Konya Sports Complex
Attendance: 35
Referees: Andžej Urbanovič (LTU), Ileana Maria Dragoi (ROU), Stefán Kristinsson (ISL)

16 August 2024
21:30

Boxscore

| Bulgaria | 59–84 | Austria |
Scoring by quarter: 12–23, 18–30, 9–19, 20–12
| Pts: Stoycheva 16; Rebs: Bakalova 7 Asts: Bozova, Kotseva 4 | | Pts: Pilic 17; Rebs: Three players 6 Asts: Brunner 5 |

Konya Sports Complex
Attendance: 35
Referees: Duhan Köyici (TUR), Irene Frosolini (ITA), Eduard Uhrin (SVK)

17 August 2024
14:00

Boxscore

| Czechia | 61–35 | Netherlands |
Scoring by quarter: 17–18, 10–9, 18–5, 16–3
| Pts: Belacova 10; Rebs: Novotna 9 Asts: Belacova 4 | | Pts: Lieverst 14; Rebs: Lieverst 6 Asts: van Duijn 4 |

Konya Sports Complex
Attendance: 65
Referees: Ioannis Tiganis (GRE), Rúben Györfy (HUN), Emma Perry (IRL)

17 August 2024
21:30

Boxscore

| Luxembourg | 49–82 | Bulgaria |
Scoring by quarter: 13–17, 9–28, 14–17, 13–20
| Pts: Missavage 12; Rebs: von Arx 5 Asts: Liska 3 | | Pts: Bozova 20; Rebs: Atanasova 10; Asts: Bozova 8 |

Konya Sports Complex II
Attendance: 50
Referees: Amalia Marchiş (ROU), Hasan Bajgoric (BIH), Elldin Uglari (KOS)

19 August 2024
21:30

Boxscore

| Austria | 52–70 | Luxembourg |
Scoring by quarter: 14–19, 13–9, 15–21, 10–21
| Pts: Pilic 15; Rebs: Pilic 9 Asts: Mayr 6 | | Pts: Liska, Missavage 14; Rebs: von Arx 9 Asts: Wies 6 |

Konya Sports Complex II
Attendance: 70
Referees: Emma Perry (IRL), Eduard Uhrin (SVK), Ruslan Khaligov (AZE)

19 August 2024
21:30

Boxscore

| Bulgaria | 47–88 | Czechia |
Scoring by quarter: 15–26, 7–24, 12–18, 13–20
| Pts: Kotseva 9 Rebs: Milenova 5 Asts: Bozova 5 | | Pts: Subova 18; Rebs: Subova 9 Asts: Tegelova 6 |

Konya Sports Complex
Attendance: 50
Referees: Amalia Marchiş (ROU), Hugo Blanco Marques Da Silva (POR), Volodymyr Pediev (UKR)

20 August 2024
16:30

Boxscore

| Netherlands | 73–45 | Bulgaria |
Scoring by quarter: 14–6, 24–9, 10–17, 25–13
| Pts: Lieverst 24; Rebs: Reijnen 9 Asts: Lieverst, Van Dijk 5 | | Pts: Milenova 15; Rebs: Stoycheva, Bandrova 6 Asts: Bozova 7 |

Konya Sports Complex
Attendance: 50
Referees: Josh Bowe (GBR), Emma Perry (IRL), Stefán Kristinsson (ISL)

20 August 2024
19:00

Boxscore

| Czechia | 83–42 | Austria |
Scoring by quarter: 22–12, 21–4, 26–11, 14–15
| Pts: Subova 17; Rebs: Novotna 11; Asts: Robson, Belacova 4 | | Pts: Kunert 8 Rebs: Kuranovic 7 Asts: Kress, Kunert 3 |

Konya Sports Complex
Attendance: 60
Referees: Janis Rozenbergs (LAT), Roko Hordov (CRO), Mbaye Seye (SEN)

== 17th–20th place classification ==
=== Group E ===
| Pos | Team | Pld | W | L | PF | PA | PD | Pts |
|---|---|---|---|---|---|---|---|---|
| 17 | Estonia | 3 | 3 | 0 | 251 | 137 | +114 | 6 |
| 18 | Luxembourg | 3 | 2 | 1 | 179 | 166 | +13 | 5 |
| 19 | Switzerland | 3 | 1 | 2 | 163 | 205 | −42 | 4 |
| 20 | Kosovo | 3 | 0 | 3 | 130 | 215 | −85 | 3 |

Source: FIBA

22 August 2024
11:30

Boxscore

| Switzerland | 52–55 | Luxembourg |
Scoring by quarter: 18–14, 8–13, 17–11, 9–17
| Pts: Popovic 22; Rebs: MacDonald, Popovic 9 Asts: Lanfranchi Rio 5 | | Pts: Liska 18; Rebs: Missavage 14; Asts: Jander 4 |

Konya Sports Complex
Attendance: 20
Referees: Amalia Marchiş (ROU), Volodymyr Pediev (UKR), Sarty Nghixulifwa (NAM)

22 August 2024
11:30

Boxscore

| Estonia | 76–41 | Kosovo |
Scoring by quarter: 16–10, 14–8, 32–8, 14–15
| Pts: Grunmann 22; Rebs: Veisberg 8 Asts: Lesina, Veisberg 4 | | Pts: Gashi 22; Rebs: Gashi 11; Asts: Three players 2 |

Konya Sports Complex II
Attendance: 15
Referees: Hasan Bajgoric (BIH), Ruslan Khaligov (AZE), Mbaye Seye (SEN)

23 August 2024
11:30

Boxscore

| Kosovo | 42–65 | Switzerland |
Scoring by quarter: 12–7, 8–17, 14–23, 8–18
| Pts: Hoti 16; Rebs: Gashi 10; Asts: Goçaj, Gashi 5 | | Pts: Corthay 17; Rebs: MacDonald 12; Asts: Bildstein 4 |

Konya Sports Complex
Attendance: 25
Referees: Veronika Vavrova (CZE), Claudia Ferrara (ITA), Hugo Blanco Marques Da Silva (POR)

23 August 2024
11:30

Boxscore

| Luxembourg | 50–67 | Estonia |
Scoring by quarter: 10–20, 20–18, 9–14, 11–15
| Pts: Liska 13; Rebs: Buzasi 15; Asts: Wies 3 | | Pts: Grunmann 21; Rebs: Lesina 10; Asts: Marjamae 5 |

Konya Sports Complex II
Attendance: 10
Referees: Josh Bowe (GBR), Marija Ciric (SRB), Monika Mincheva (BUL)

24 August 2024
09:30

Boxscore

| Switzerland | 46–108 | Estonia |
Scoring by quarter: 6–25, 15–25, 13–25, 12–33
| Pts: MacDonald 11; Rebs: MacDonald 11; Asts: Bildstein 5 | | Pts: Ristimets 24; Rebs: Ristimets 6 Asts: Lesina 7 |

Konya Sports Complex
Attendance: 20
Referees: Emma Perry (IRL), Mbaye Seye (SEN), Hasan Bajgoric (BIH)

24 August 2024
11:30

Boxscore

| Kosovo | 47–74 | Luxembourg |
Scoring by quarter: 13–14, 12–24, 12–14, 10–22
| Pts: Goçaj 13; Rebs: Belegu 13; Asts: Goçaj 10 | | Pts: Liska 22; Rebs: Buzasi 11; Asts: Wies 7 |

Konya Sports Complex II
Attendance: 25
Referees: Cynthia Le Quilliec (FRA), Sarty Nghixulifwa (NAM), Volodymyr Pediev (UKR)

== 9th–16th place playoffs ==
13th place match
Iceland | 72
Bosnia and Herzegovina | 83
15th place match
Ukraine | 53
Bulgaria | 60

13th–16th place semifinals
Iceland | 65
Ukraine | 43
Bosnia and Herzegovina | 68
Bulgaria | 50

9th–16th place quarterfinals
A3 | Portugal | 88
B4 | Iceland | 53
D3 | Netherlands | 75
C4 | Ukraine | 47
B3 | Bosnia and Herzegovina | 63
A4 | Norway | 73
C3 | Ireland | 70
D4 | Bulgaria | 68

9th–12th place semifinals
Portugal | 63
Netherlands | 46
Norway | 52
Ireland | 93

9th place match
Portugal | 77
Ireland | 55
11th place match
Netherlands | 87
Norway | 61

=== 9th–16th place quarterfinals ===
22 August 2024
14:00

Boxscore

| Portugal | 88–53 | Iceland |
Scoring by quarter: 26–23, 16–9, 18–10, 28–11
| Pts: C. Silva 30; Rebs: C. Silva 14; Asts: Alves 8 | | Pts: Thorleifsdottir 11; Rebs: Sara , Thorkelsdottir 4 Asts: Three players 3 |

Konya Sports Complex II
Attendance: 50
Referees: Andžej Urbanovič (LTU), Stefan Zdravkovic (SRB), Alexander Egil Reiertsen (NOR)

22 August 2024
16:30

Boxscore

| Netherlands | 75–47 | Ukraine |
Scoring by quarter: 25–7, 16–18, 10–11, 24–11
| Pts: Lieverst 17; Rebs: Lieverst 8 Asts: Lieverst 7 | | Pts: Do. Murzova 18; Rebs: Da. Murzova 9 Asts: Maksymchuk 5 |

Konya Sports Complex II
Attendance: 50
Referees: Michal Chrakowiecki (POL), Duhan Köyici (TUR), Marija Ciric (SRB)

22 August 2024
19:00

Boxscore

| Bosnia and Herzegovina | 63–73 | Norway |
Scoring by quarter: 14–17, 16–20, 16–16, 17–20
| Pts: Bekic 20; Rebs: Bekic, Talic 9 Asts: Bekic, Talic 5 | | Pts: Hjelle 18; Rebs: Rotherud 13; Asts: Hjelle 7 |

Konya Sports Complex II
Attendance: 60
Referees: Hugo Blanco Marques Da Silva (POR), Stefán Kristinsson (ISL), Elldin Uglari (KOS)

22 August 2024
21:30

Boxscore

| Ireland | 70–68 | Bulgaria |
Scoring by quarter: 16–22, 11–9, 21–14, 22–23
| Pts: Donnelly 22; Rebs: Donnelly 7 Asts: Lyons 4 | | Pts: Kichukova 15; Rebs: Stanislavova 12; Asts: Bozova 6 |

Konya Sports Complex II
Attendance: 90
Referees: Cynthia Le Quilliec (FRA), Ileana Maria Dragoi (ROU), Jurgen Muho (LUX)

=== 13th–16th place semifinals ===
23 August 2024
14:00

Boxscore

| Iceland | 65–43 | Ukraine |
Scoring by quarter: 17–8, 15–16, 24–6, 9–13
| Pts: Logadottir 18; Rebs: Agnarsdottir 7 Asts: Steingrimsdottir, Gudjonsdottir 4 | | Pts: Do. Murzova 14; Rebs: Petryshak 12; Asts: Maksymchuk 4 |

Konya Sports Complex II
Attendance: 25
Referees: Ioannis Tiganis (GRE), Eduard Uhrin (SVK), Mbaye Seye (SEN)

23 August 2024
16:30

Boxscore

| Bosnia and Herzegovina | 68–50 | Bulgaria |
Scoring by quarter: 21–8, 17–13, 10–14, 20–15
| Pts: Sehovic 29; Rebs: Talic 9 Asts: Bekic 6 | | Pts: Stanislavova 13; Rebs: Milenova, Stanislavova 8 Asts: Bozova 8 |

Konya Sports Complex II
Attendance: 50
Referees: Andžej Urbanovič (LTU), Emma Perry (IRL), Sarty Nghixulifwa (NAM)

=== 15th place match ===
24 August 2024
12:00

Boxscore

| Ukraine | 53–60 | Bulgaria |
Scoring by quarter: 18–14, 18–18, 11–14, 6–14
| Pts: Anisimova 17; Rebs: Da. Murzova 8 Asts: Da. Murzova 6 | | Pts: Bozova, Kotseva 12; Rebs: Milenova 13; Asts: Bozova, Kichukova 6 |

Konya Sports Complex II
Attendance: 10
Referees: Jurgen Muho (LUX), Alexander Egil Reiertsen (NOR), Elldin Uglari (KOS)

=== 13th place match ===
24 August 2024
14:30

Boxscore

| Iceland | 72–83 | Bosnia and Herzegovina |
Scoring by quarter: 24–19, 18–23, 21–15, 9–26
| Pts: Logadottir 17; Rebs: Steingrimsdottir 6 Asts: Steingrimsdottir, Gudjonsdottir 4 | | Pts: Sehovic 30; Rebs: Talic, Mujezinovic 8 Asts: Merdanovic, Mujezinovic 5 |

Konya Sports Complex II
Attendance: 50
Referees: Rúben Györfy (HUN), Ileana Maria Dragoi (ROU), Hugo Blanco Marques Da Silva (POR)

=== 9th–12th place semifinals ===
23 August 2024
19:00

Boxscore

| Portugal | 63–46 | Netherlands |
Scoring by quarter: 17–11, 18–10, 18–11, 10–14
| Pts: C. Silva 19; Rebs: C. Silva 16; Asts: Sousa 7 | | Pts: Lieverst 20; Rebs: Lieverst 8 Asts: Van Dijk, van Stein 3 |

Konya Sports Complex II
Attendance: 75
Referees: Ileana Maria Dragoi (ROU), Amalia Marchiş (ROU), Elldin Uglari (KOS)

23 August 2024
21:30

Boxscore

| Norway | 52–93 | Ireland |
Scoring by quarter: 17–28, 12–14, 12–24, 11–27
| Pts: Sanford 13; Rebs: Rotherud 6 Asts: Tveiten, Hoelsbrekken 3 | | Pts: Lyons 27; Rebs: Hartigan 8 Asts: Farrington, Summers 4 |

Konya Sports Complex II
Attendance: 105
Referees: Duhan Köyici (TUR), Hendrik Laas (EST), Volodymyr Pediev (UKR)

=== 11th place match ===
24 August 2024
17:00

Boxscore

| Netherlands | 87–61 | Norway |
Scoring by quarter: 18–15, 25–16, 22–11, 22–19
| Pts: Lieverst 27; Rebs: van Stein 8 Asts: Lieverst 8 | | Pts: Sanford 23; Rebs: Tveiten, Sanford 8 Asts: Hjelle 5 |

Konya Sports Complex II
Attendance: 50
Referees: Stefan Zdravkovic (SRB), Monika Mincheva (BUL), Ruslan Khaligov (AZE)

=== 9th place match ===
24 August 2024
19:30

Boxscore

| Portugal | 77–55 | Ireland |
Scoring by quarter: 20–14, 18–16, 22–12, 17–13
| Pts: C. Silva 23; Rebs: C. Silva 12; Asts: Palma, Monteiro 5 | | Pts: Donnelly 14; Rebs: Donnelly 6 Asts: Summers 5 |

Konya Sports Complex II
Attendance: 60
Referees: Michal Chrakowiecki (POL), Marija Ciric (SRB), Stefán Kristinsson (ISL)

== Championship playoffs ==
5th place match
Denmark | 58
Lithuania | 68
7th place match
Slovakia | 58
Austria | 65

5th–8th place semifinals
Denmark | 63
Slovakia | 49
Lithuania | 71
Austria | 52

Quarterfinals
A1 | Denmark | 61
B2 | Great Britain | 86
D1 | Czechia | 76
C2 | Slovakia | 43
B1 | Lithuania | 66
A2 | Romania | 77
C1 | Turkey | 92
D2 | Austria | 57

Semifinals
Great Britain | 61
Czechia | 65
Romania | 49
Turkey | 44

Final
Czechia | 52
Romania | 54
3rd place match
Great Britain | 84
Turkey | 62

=== Quarterfinals ===
22 August 2024
14:00

Boxscore

| Denmark | 61–86 | Great Britain |
Scoring by quarter: 17–14, 12–23, 10–31, 22–18
| Pts: Norregaard-Laursen 15; Rebs: Marion 13; Asts: Reumert 4 | | Pts: Oboavwoduo 26; Rebs: Vella 9 Asts: Briggs 8 |

Konya Sports Complex
Attendance: 50
Referees: Ioannis Tiganis (GRE), Irene Frosolini (ITA), Hendrik Laas (EST)

22 August 2024
16:30

Boxscore

| Czechia | 76–43 | Slovakia |
Scoring by quarter: 13–15, 22–14, 19–5, 22–9
| Pts: Tegelova 15; Rebs: Vyhlidova 11; Asts: Subova, Vyhlidova 3 | | Pts: Oravcova 10; Rebs: Kovacsova 10; Asts: Hudecova 4 |

Konya Sports Complex
Attendance: 75
Referees: Roko Hordov (CRO), Monika Mincheva (BUL), Rúben Györfy (HUN)

22 August 2024
19:00

Boxscore

| Turkey | 92–57 | Austria |
Scoring by quarter: 23–11, 24–18, 24–13, 21–15
| Pts: Cinar 17; Rebs: Sahin 10; Asts: Sel 8 | | Pts: Kunert 16; Rebs: Kuranovic 6 Asts: Mayr 3 |

Konya Sports Complex
Attendance: 300
Referees: Josh Bowe (GBR), Emma Perry (IRL), Eduard Uhrin (SVK)

22 August 2024
21:30

Boxscore

| Lithuania | 66–77 | Romania |
Scoring by quarter: 17–23, 11–21, 23–17, 15–16
| Pts: Galvanauskaite 17; Rebs: Galvanauskaite 11; Asts: Mockeviciute 4 | | Pts: Velcea 29; Rebs: Teglas 10; Asts: Marcus 7 |

Konya Sports Complex
Attendance: 100
Referees: Veronika Vavrova (CZE), Janis Rozenbergs (LAT), Claudia Ferrara (ITA)

=== 5th–8th place semifinals ===
23 August 2024
14:00

Boxscore

| Denmark | 63–49 | Slovakia |
Scoring by quarter: 17–14, 16–13, 12–13, 18–9
| Pts: Norregaard-Laursen 14; Rebs: Marion 17; Asts: Madsen 5 | | Pts: Vigasova 8 Rebs: Vigasova 9 Asts: Hudecova 7 |

Konya Sports Complex
Attendance: 75
Referees: Hasan Bajgoric (BIH), Alexander Egil Reiertsen (NOR), Stefán Kristinsson (ISL)

23 August 2024
16:30

Boxscore

| Lithuania | 71–52 | Austria |
Scoring by quarter: 21–11, 14–12, 17–24, 19–5
| Pts: Vaitkute 15; Rebs: Vaitkute 15; Asts: Mockeviciute 6 | | Pts: Mayr 12; Rebs: Kuranovic 9 Asts: Kuranovic 4 |

Konya Sports Complex
Attendance: 50
Referees: Rúben Györfy (HUN), Jurgen Muho (LUX), Ruslan Khaligov (AZE)

=== 7th place match ===
24 August 2024
13:00

Boxscore

| Slovakia | 58–65 | Austria |
Scoring by quarter: 11–17, 12–10, 19–20, 16–18
| Pts: Oravcova 22; Rebs: Vigasova 10; Asts: Oravcova, Vigasova 4 | | Pts: Mayr 17; Rebs: Kuranovic 12; Asts: Kunert 4 |

Konya Sports Complex
Attendance: 40
Referees: Andžej Urbanovič (LTU), Claudia Ferrara (ITA), Irene Frosolini (ITA)

=== 5th place match ===
24 August 2024
15:30

Boxscore

| Denmark | 58–68 | Lithuania |
Scoring by quarter: 13–26, 16–20, 12–14, 17–8
| Pts: Norregaard-Laursen 17; Rebs: Marion 10; Asts: Madsen 5 | | Pts: Galvanauskaite 20; Rebs: Galvanauskaite 11; Asts: Pupelyte 7 |

Konya Sports Complex
Attendance: 75
Referees: Amalia Marchiş (ROU), Hendrik Laas (EST), Eduard Uhrin (SVK)

=== Semifinals ===
23 August 2024
19:00

Boxscore

| Romania | 49–44 | Turkey |
Scoring by quarter: 12–7, 4–14, 11–12, 22–11
| Pts: Marcus 13; Rebs: Babadac 8 Asts: Velcea 5 | | Pts: Demirer 11; Rebs: Avcı, Demirer 11; Asts: Avcı 4 |

Konya Sports Complex
Attendance: 1,800
Referees: Roko Hordov (CRO), Stefan Zdravkovic (SRB), Irene Frosolini (ITA)

23 August 2024
21:30

Boxscore

| Great Britain | 61–65 | Czechia |
Scoring by quarter: 12–21, 21–16, 21–13, 7–15
| Pts: Thompson 24; Rebs: Vella 11; Asts: Oboavwoduo 4 | | Pts: Subova 19; Rebs: Vyhlidova 14; Asts: Tegelova 5 |

Konya Sports Complex
Attendance: 30
Referees: Janis Rozenbergs (LAT), Cynthia Le Quilliec (FRA), Michal Chrakowiecki (POL)

=== 3rd place match ===
24 August 2024
18:00

Boxscore

| Great Britain | 84–62 | Turkey |
Scoring by quarter: 26–3, 19–20, 16–11, 23–28
| Pts: Thompson 24; Rebs: Briggs 10; Asts: Three players 4 | | Pts: Yalinkaya 14; Rebs: Demirer 14; Asts: Yalinkaya 6 |

Konya Sports Complex
Attendance: 1,600
Referees: Veronika Vavrova (CZE), Roko Hordov (CRO), Janis Rozenbergs (LAT)

=== Final ===
24 August 2024
20:30

Boxscore

| Czechia | 52–54 | Romania |
Scoring by quarter: 11–11, 12–16, 16–14, 13–13
| Pts: Vyhlidova 17; Rebs: Vyhlidova 22; Asts: Robson 3 | | Pts: Marcus 15; Rebs: Valea 8 Asts: Danciulescu 3 |

Konya Sports Complex
Attendance: 1,000
Referees: Duhan Köyici (TUR), Josh Bowe (GBR), Ioannis Tiganis (GRE)

== Final standings ==
| Rank | Team | Record |
|---|---|---|
| 1st place, gold medalist(s) | Romania | 6–1 |
| 2nd place, silver medalist(s) | Czechia | 6–1 |
| 3rd place, bronze medalist(s) | Great Britain | 5–2 |
| 4 | Turkey | 5–2 |
| 5 | Lithuania | 6–1 |
| 6 | Denmark | 4–3 |
| 7 | Austria | 3–4 |
| 8 | Slovakia | 3–4 |
| 9 | Portugal | 6–1 |
| 10 | Ireland | 4–3 |
| 11 | Netherlands | 4–3 |
| 12 | Norway | 2–5 |
| 13 | Bosnia and Herzegovina | 4–3 |
| 14 | Iceland | 2–5 |
| 15 | Bulgaria | 2–5 |
| 16 | Ukraine | 1–6 |
| 17 | Estonia | 3–4 |
| 18 | Luxembourg | 3–4 |
| 19 | Switzerland | 1–6 |
| 20 | Kosovo | 0–7 |

| Promoted to the 2025 FIBA U16 Women's EuroBasket Division A |
| Relegated to the 2025 FIBA U16 Women's EuroBasket Division C |
