= Lithuania women's national under-16 basketball team =

National basketball team of Lithuania

Lithuania
- FIBA zone: FIBA Europe
- National federation: Lithuanian Basketball Federation

U17 World Cup
- Appearances: None

U16 EuroBasket
- Appearances: 14
- Medals: Silver: 1 (2019); Bronze: 1 (2006)

U16 EuroBasket Division B
- Appearances: 8
- Medals: Gold: 3 (2012, 2015, 2025); Silver: 1 (2004)

The Lithuania women's national under-16 basketball team is a national basketball team of Lithuania, administered by the Lithuanian Basketball Federation. It represents the country in international under-16 women's basketball competitions.

== FIBA U16 Women's EuroBasket participations ==
Year	Division A	Division B
1993	9th	
2004		2nd place, silver medalist(s)
2005	9th	
2006	3rd place, bronze medalist(s)	
2007	13th	
2008	12th	
2009	12th	
2010	16th	
2011		5th
2012		1st place, gold medalist(s)
2013	15th	

Year	Division A	Division B
2014		9th
2015		1st place, gold medalist(s)
2016	6th	
2017	14th	
2018	11th	
2019	2nd place, silver medalist(s)	
2022	15th	
2023		7th
2024		5th
2025		1st place, gold medalist(s)
2026	11th	

== See also ==
- Lithuania women's national basketball team
- Lithuania women's national under-18 and under-19 basketball team
- Lithuania men's national under-16 and under-17 basketball team
