= 2023 FIBA U16 Women's European Championship Division B =

Tournament details
- Host country: Montenegro
- City: Podgorica
- Dates: 10–19 August 2023
- Teams: 20 (from 1 confederation)
- Venue(s): 2 (in 1 host city)

Final positions
- Champions: Germany (3rd title)
- Runners-up: Montenegro
- Third place: Sweden

Official website
- www.fiba.basketball/history

The 2023 FIBA U16 Women's European Championship Division B was the 18th edition of the Division B of the European basketball championship for women's national under-16 teams. The tournament was played from 10 to 19 August 2023 in Podgorica, Montenegro.

== Participating teams ==
- Austria
- Bosnia and Herzegovina
- Bulgaria
- Cyprus ▲ (Winners, 2022 FIBA U16 Women's European Championship Division C)
- Denmark ▼ (16th place, 2022 FIBA U16 Women's European Championship Division A)
- Estonia
- Germany ▼ (14th place, 2022 FIBA U16 Women's European Championship Division A)
- Great Britain
- Iceland
- Ireland
- Lithuania ▼ (15th place, 2022 FIBA U16 Women's European Championship Division A)
- Luxembourg
- Montenegro
- Netherlands
- Norway
- Romania
- Slovakia
- Sweden
- Switzerland
- Ukraine

== First round ==
The draw of the first round was held on 14 February 2023 in Freising, Germany.

In the first round, the teams were drawn into four groups of five. The first two teams from each group advanced to the quarterfinals; the third and the fourth teams advanced to the 9th–16th place playoffs; the other teams advanced to the 17th–20th place classification group.

All times are local (Central European Summer Time – UTC+2).

=== Group A ===
Pos	Team	Pld	W	L	PF	PA	PD	Pts	Qualification
1	Lithuania	4	4	0	290	194	+96	8	Quarterfinals
2	Romania	4	3	1	257	218	+39	7	Quarterfinals
3	Slovakia	4	2	2	289	232	+57	6	9th–16th place playoffs
4	Austria	4	1	3	208	254	−46	5	9th–16th place playoffs
5	Switzerland	4	0	4	142	288	−146	4	17th–20th place classification

Source: FIBA

10 August 2023
13:30

Boxscore

Romania	70–33	Switzerland
Scoring by quarter: 21–12, 15–10, 16–7, 18–4

University Sports & Culture Hall, Podgorica

10 August 2023
16:00

Boxscore

Lithuania	67–36	Austria
Scoring by quarter: 21–9, 17–8, 17–7, 12–12

University Sports & Culture Hall, Podgorica

11 August 2023
13:30

Boxscore

Slovakia	68–82	Lithuania
Scoring by quarter: 13–19, 19–22, 15–23, 21–18

Kuća Košarke, Podgorica

11 August 2023
18:30

Boxscore

Austria	48–65	Romania
Scoring by quarter: 9–24, 13–13, 11–10, 15–18

Kuća Košarke, Podgorica

12 August 2023
16:00

Boxscore

Romania	68–54	Slovakia
Scoring by quarter: 13–10, 24–13, 12–11, 19–20

University Sports & Culture Hall, Podgorica

12 August 2023
21:00

Boxscore

Switzerland	40–75	Austria
Scoring by quarter: 11–22, 9–21, 6–12, 14–20

Kuća Košarke, Podgorica

14 August 2023
18:30

Boxscore

Slovakia	85–33	Switzerland
Scoring by quarter: 17–15, 29–4, 21–9, 18–5

Kuća Košarke, Podgorica

14 August 2023
21:00

Boxscore

Lithuania	83–54	Romania
Scoring by quarter: 17–18, 26–10, 20–17, 20–9

Kuća Košarke, Podgorica

15 August 2023
18:30

Boxscore

Switzerland	36–58	Lithuania
Scoring by quarter: 2–24, 8–10, 10–17, 16–7

University Sports & Culture Hall, Podgorica

15 August 2023
21:00

Boxscore

Austria	49–82	Slovakia
Scoring by quarter: 10–25, 11–20, 14–29, 14–8

University Sports & Culture Hall, Podgorica

=== Group B ===
Pos	Team	Pld	W	L	PF	PA	PD	Pts	Qualification
1	Montenegro	4	4	0	323	148	+175	8	Quarterfinals
2	Sweden	4	3	1	240	216	+24	7	Quarterfinals
3	Ireland	4	2	2	203	233	−30	6	9th–16th place playoffs
4	Bulgaria	4	1	3	224	250	−26	5	9th–16th place playoffs
5	Cyprus	4	0	4	131	274	−143	4	17th–20th place classification

Source: FIBA

10 August 2023
18:30

Boxscore

Montenegro	81–25	Cyprus
Scoring by quarter: 25–5, 16–6, 17–5, 23–9

University Sports & Culture Hall, Podgorica

10 August 2023
21:00

Boxscore

Sweden	67–53	Ireland
Scoring by quarter: 17–13, 20–24, 18–8, 12–8

University Sports & Culture Hall, Podgorica

11 August 2023
18:30

Boxscore

Ireland	45–82	Montenegro
Scoring by quarter: 14–30, 2–24, 16–19, 13–9

University Sports & Culture Hall, Podgorica

11 August 2023
21:00

Boxscore

Bulgaria	64–65	Sweden
Scoring by quarter: 11–14, 18–20, 18–17, 17–14

Kuća Košarke, Podgorica

12 August 2023
13:30

Boxscore

Cyprus	36–51	Ireland
Scoring by quarter: 13–17, 5–10, 9–18, 9–6

Kuća Košarke, Podgorica

12 August 2023
18:30

Boxscore

Montenegro	93–36	Bulgaria
Scoring by quarter: 22–5, 19–15, 29–5, 23–11

University Sports & Culture Hall, Podgorica

14 August 2023
16:00

Boxscore

Bulgaria	76–38	Cyprus
Scoring by quarter: 26–8, 17–10, 14–12, 19–8

University Sports & Culture Hall, Podgorica

14 August 2023
18:30

Boxscore

Sweden	42–67	Montenegro
Scoring by quarter: 11–23, 4–15, 8–14, 19–15

University Sports & Culture Hall, Podgorica

15 August 2023
13:30

Boxscore

Ireland	54–48	Bulgaria
Scoring by quarter: 14–15, 10–5, 12–15, 18–13

Kuća Košarke, Podgorica

15 August 2023
18:30

Boxscore

Cyprus	32–66	Sweden
Scoring by quarter: 10–13, 0–14, 8–18, 14–21

Kuća Košarke, Podgorica

=== Group C ===
Pos	Team	Pld	W	L	PF	PA	PD	Pts	Qualification
1	Great Britain	4	4	0	279	199	+80	8	Quarterfinals
2	Iceland	4	3	1	273	204	+69	7	Quarterfinals
3	Netherlands	4	1	3	186	237	−51	5	9th–16th place playoffs
4	Denmark	4	1	3	193	262	−69	5	9th–16th place playoffs
5	Bosnia and Herzegovina	4	1	3	197	226	−29	5	17th–20th place classification

Source: FIBA

10 August 2023
13:30

Boxscore

Great Britain	65–54	Iceland
Scoring by quarter: 15–20, 18–25, 17–7, 15–2

Kuća Košarke, Podgorica

10 August 2023
18:30

Boxscore

Denmark	51–45	Bosnia and Herzegovina
Scoring by quarter: 7–16, 8–9, 17–13, 19–7

Kuća Košarke, Podgorica

11 August 2023
13:30

Boxscore

Netherlands	53–45	Denmark
Scoring by quarter: 11–13, 17–15, 12–11, 13–6

University Sports & Culture Hall, Podgorica

11 August 2023
21:00

Boxscore

Bosnia and Herzegovina	46–61	Great Britain
Scoring by quarter: 11–13, 8–14, 18–15, 9–19

University Sports & Culture Hall, Podgorica

12 August 2023
18:30

Boxscore

Great Britain	78–49	Netherlands
Scoring by quarter: 24–18, 19–11, 20–13, 15–7

Kuća Košarke, Podgorica

12 August 2023
21:00

Boxscore

Iceland	67–55	Bosnia and Herzegovina
Scoring by quarter: 23–16, 14–8, 18–12, 12–19

University Sports & Culture Hall, Podgorica

14 August 2023
13:30

Boxscore

Netherlands	37–63	Iceland
Scoring by quarter: 6–18, 10–14, 11–11, 10–20

Kuća Košarke, Podgorica

14 August 2023
21:00

Boxscore

Denmark	50–75	Great Britain
Scoring by quarter: 11–19, 13–20, 14–20, 12–16

University Sports & Culture Hall, Podgorica

15 August 2023
16:00

Boxscore

Iceland	89–47	Denmark
Scoring by quarter: 26–4, 23–5, 20–7, 20–31

Kuća Košarke, Podgorica

15 August 2023
16:00

Boxscore

Bosnia and Herzegovina	51–47	Netherlands
Scoring by quarter: 9–8, 9–12, 19–12, 14–15

University Sports & Culture Hall, Podgorica

=== Group D ===
Pos	Team	Pld	W	L	PF	PA	PD	Pts	Qualification
1	Germany	4	4	0	391	138	+253	8	Quarterfinals
2	Estonia	4	3	1	273	252	+21	7	Quarterfinals
3	Ukraine	4	2	2	225	235	−10	6	9th–16th place playoffs
4	Luxembourg	4	1	3	182	239	−57	5	9th–16th place playoffs
5	Norway	4	0	4	131	338	−207	4	17th–20th place classification

Source: FIBA

10 August 2023
16:00

Boxscore

Norway	38–81	Estonia
Scoring by quarter: 8–14, 5–15, 12–30, 13–22

Kuća Košarke, Podgorica

10 August 2023
21:00

Boxscore

Germany	88–16	Luxembourg
Scoring by quarter: 15–4, 18–5, 36–3, 19–4

Kuća Košarke, Podgorica

11 August 2023
16:00

Boxscore

Ukraine	41–78	Germany
Scoring by quarter: 4–9, 17–24, 12–23, 8–22

Kuća Košarke, Podgorica

11 August 2023
16:00

Boxscore

Luxembourg	59–29	Norway
Scoring by quarter: 14–10, 12–9, 16–3, 17–7

University Sports & Culture Hall, Podgorica

12 August 2023
13:30

Boxscore

Norway	38–67	Ukraine
Scoring by quarter: 7–17, 16–21, 8–15, 7–14

University Sports & Culture Hall, Podgorica

12 August 2023
16:00

Boxscore

Estonia	69–56	Luxembourg
Scoring by quarter: 16–8, 12–12, 22–22, 19–14

Kuća Košarke, Podgorica

14 August 2023
13:30

Boxscore

Ukraine	64–68	Estonia
Scoring by quarter: 22–17, 17–10, 14–19, 11–22

University Sports & Culture Hall, Podgorica

14 August 2023
16:00

Boxscore

Germany	131–26	Norway
Scoring by quarter: 20–11, 50–3, 27–3, 34–9

Kuća Košarke, Podgorica

15 August 2023
13:30

Boxscore

Estonia	55–94	Germany
Scoring by quarter: 13–27, 10–28, 8–25, 24–14

University Sports & Culture Hall, Podgorica

15 August 2023
21:00

Boxscore

Luxembourg	51–53	Ukraine
Scoring by quarter: 20–9, 10–12, 13–7, 8–25

Kuća Košarke, Podgorica

== 17th–20th place classification ==
Pos	Team	Pld	W	L	PF	PA	PD	Pts
17	Bosnia and Herzegovina	3	3	0	231	136	+95	6
18	Switzerland	3	2	1	157	145	+12	5
19	Norway	3	1	2	126	205	−79	4
20	Cyprus	3	0	3	136	164	−28	3

Source: FIBA

17 August 2023
11:00

Boxscore

Cyprus	55–63	Bosnia and Herzegovina
Scoring by quarter: 12–12, 15–18, 15–21, 13–12

University Sports & Culture Hall, Podgorica

17 August 2023
11:00

Boxscore

Switzerland	61–40	Norway
Scoring by quarter: 12–12, 8–8, 14–9, 27–11

Kuća Košarke, Podgorica

18 August 2023
11:00

Boxscore

Bosnia and Herzegovina	71–46	Switzerland
Scoring by quarter: 14–15, 21–12, 21–11, 15–8

Kuća Košarke, Podgorica

18 August 2023
11:00

Boxscore

Norway	51–47	Cyprus
Scoring by quarter: 15–14, 11–15, 9–3, 16–15

University Sports & Culture Hall, Podgorica

19 August 2023
10:00

Boxscore

Switzerland	50–34	Cyprus
Scoring by quarter: 10–2, 11–12, 19–9, 10–11

Kuća Košarke, Podgorica

19 August 2023
11:00

Boxscore

Bosnia and Herzegovina	97–35	Norway
Scoring by quarter: 29–10, 25–8, 22–8, 21–9

University Sports & Culture Hall, Podgorica

== 9th–16th place playoffs ==
13th place match
Denmark	59
Ireland	52
15th place match
Bulgaria	78
Luxembourg	52

13th–16th place semifinals
Bulgaria	68
Denmark	81
Ireland	63
Luxembourg	58

9th–16th place quarterfinals
A3	Slovakia	90
B4	Bulgaria	55
D3	Ukraine	57
C4	Denmark	48
B3	Ireland	63
A4	Austria (OT)	66
C3	Netherlands	55
D4	Luxembourg	34

9th–12th place semifinals
Slovakia	72
Ukraine	61
Austria	41
Netherlands	63

9th place match
Slovakia	66
Netherlands	48
11th place match
Ukraine	70
Austria	49

=== 9th–16th place quarterfinals ===
17 August 2023
13:30

Boxscore

Slovakia	90–55	Bulgaria
Scoring by quarter: 31–9, 22–13, 19–21, 18–12

Kuća Košarke, Podgorica

17 August 2023
16:00

Boxscore

Ukraine	57–48	Denmark
Scoring by quarter: 23–10, 13–9, 11–14, 10–15

Kuća Košarke, Podgorica

17 August 2023
18:30

Boxscore

Ireland	63–66 (OT)	Austria
Scoring by quarter: 14–9, 24–16, 14–17, 6–16, Overtime: 5–8

Kuća Košarke, Podgorica

17 August 2023
21:00

Boxscore

Netherlands	55–34	Luxembourg
Scoring by quarter: 18–12, 16–8, 10–8, 11–6

Kuća Košarke, Podgorica

=== 13th–16th place semifinals ===
18 August 2023
13:30

Boxscore

Bulgaria	68–81	Denmark
Scoring by quarter: 17–35, 14–12, 18–12, 19–22

Kuća Košarke, Podgorica

18 August 2023
16:00

Boxscore

Ireland	63–58	Luxembourg
Scoring by quarter: 17–11, 15–12, 18–18, 13–17

Kuća Košarke, Podgorica

=== 15th place match ===
19 August 2023
12:30

Boxscore

Bulgaria	78–52	Luxembourg
Scoring by quarter: 28–13, 17–19, 19–12, 14–8

Kuća Košarke, Podgorica

=== 13th place match ===
19 August 2023
15:00

Boxscore

Denmark	59–52	Ireland
Scoring by quarter: 14–18, 11–7, 12–10, 22–17

Kuća Košarke, Podgorica

=== 9th–12th place semifinals ===
18 August 2023
18:30

Boxscore

Slovakia	72–61	Ukraine
Scoring by quarter: 21–11, 24–15, 15–20, 12–15

Kuća Košarke, Podgorica

18 August 2023
21:00

Boxscore

Austria	41–63	Netherlands
Scoring by quarter: 12–18, 10–29, 14–4, 5–12

Kuća Košarke, Podgorica

=== 11th place match ===
19 August 2023
17:30

Boxscore

Ukraine	70–49	Austria
Scoring by quarter: 22–20, 16–6, 11–11, 21–12

Kuća Košarke, Podgorica

=== 9th place match ===
19 August 2023
20:00

Boxscore

Slovakia	66–48	Netherlands
Scoring by quarter: 11–8, 15–14, 18–17, 22–9

Kuća Košarke, Podgorica

== Championship playoffs ==
5th place match
Iceland	69
Great Britain	62
7th place match
Lithuania	65
Romania	56

5th–8th place semifinals
Lithuania	62
Iceland	64
Romania	53
Great Britain	67

Quarterfinals
A1	Lithuania	66
B2	Sweden	73
D1	Germany	83
C2	Iceland	38
B1	Montenegro	61
A2	Romania	37
C1	Great Britain	65
D2	Estonia	66

Semifinals
Sweden	45
Germany	65
Montenegro	78
Estonia	41

Final
Germany	65
Montenegro	57
3rd place match
Sweden	61
Estonia	52

=== Quarterfinals ===
17 August 2023
13:30

Boxscore

Lithuania	66–73	Sweden
Scoring by quarter: 18–21, 21–9, 15–18, 12–25

University Sports & Culture Hall, Podgorica

17 August 2023
16:00

Boxscore

Germany	83–38	Iceland
Scoring by quarter: 21–14, 22–5, 26–9, 14–10

University Sports & Culture Hall, Podgorica

17 August 2023
18:30

Boxscore

Montenegro	61–37	Romania
Scoring by quarter: 21–12, 21–4, 13–10, 6–11

University Sports & Culture Hall, Podgorica

17 August 2023
21:00

Boxscore

Great Britain	65–66	Estonia
Scoring by quarter: 14–16, 9–16, 16–14, 26–20

University Sports & Culture Hall, Podgorica

=== 5th–8th place semifinals ===
18 August 2023
13:30

Boxscore

Lithuania	62–64	Iceland
Scoring by quarter: 16–19, 14–18, 18–11, 14–16

University Sports & Culture Hall, Podgorica

18 August 2023
16:00

Boxscore

Romania	53–67	Great Britain
Scoring by quarter: 15–18, 11–9, 10–21, 17–19

University Sports & Culture Hall, Podgorica

=== 7th place match ===
19 August 2023
13:30

Boxscore

Lithuania	65–56	Romania
Scoring by quarter: 14–16, 22–11, 15–11, 14–18

University Sports & Culture Hall, Podgorica

=== 5th place match ===
19 August 2023
16:00

Boxscore

Iceland	69–62	Great Britain
Scoring by quarter: 18–17, 19–21, 12–14, 20–10

University Sports & Culture Hall, Podgorica

=== Semifinals ===
18 August 2023
18:30

Boxscore

Montenegro	78–41	Estonia
Scoring by quarter: 27–10, 19–6, 13–9, 19–16

University Sports & Culture Hall, Podgorica

18 August 2023
21:00

Boxscore

Sweden	45–65	Germany
Scoring by quarter: 10–14, 8–14, 14–23, 13–14

University Sports & Culture Hall, Podgorica

=== 3rd place match ===
19 August 2023
18:30

Boxscore

Sweden	61–52	Estonia
Scoring by quarter: 14–14, 11–13, 20–9, 16–16

University Sports & Culture Hall, Podgorica

=== Final ===
19 August 2023
21:00

Boxscore

Germany	65–57	Montenegro
Scoring by quarter: 13–15, 22–13, 13–15, 17–14

University Sports & Culture Hall, Podgorica

== Final standings ==
Rank	Team
1st place, gold medalist(s)	Germany
2nd place, silver medalist(s)	Montenegro
3rd place, bronze medalist(s)	Sweden
4	Estonia
5	Iceland
6	Great Britain
7	Lithuania
8	Romania
9	Slovakia
10	Netherlands
11	Ukraine
12	Austria
13	Denmark
14	Ireland
15	Bulgaria
16	Luxembourg
17	Bosnia and Herzegovina
18	Switzerland
19	Norway
20	Cyprus

Promoted to the 2024 FIBA U16 Women's EuroBasket Division A
