= Luxembourg women's national under-16 basketball team =

Luxembourg
- FIBA zone: FIBA Europe
- National federation: Luxembourg Basketball Federation

U17 World Cup
- Appearances: None

U16 EuroBasket
- Appearances: None

U16 EuroBasket Division B
- Appearances: 19
- Medals: None

U16 EuroBasket Division C
- Appearances: 3
- Medals: Gold: 2 (2002, 2004); Silver: 1 (2006)

The Luxembourg women's national under-16 basketball team is a national basketball team of Luxembourg, administered by the Luxembourg Basketball Federation. It represents the country in international under-16 women's basketball competitions.

== FIBA U16 Women's EuroBasket participations ==
Year	Division B	Division C
2002		1st place, gold medalist(s)
2004		1st place, gold medalist(s)
2004	13th/14th	
2006		2nd place, silver medalist(s)
2006	11th	
2008	18th	
2009	16th	
2010	16th	
2011	14th	
2012	10th	
2013	10th	

Year	Division B
2014	17th
2015	16th
2016	8th
2017	14th
2018	17th
2019	16th
2022	17th
2023	16th
2024	18th
2025	11th
2026	Rank 5 trio

== See also ==
- Luxembourg women's national basketball team
- Luxembourg women's national under-18 basketball team
- Luxembourg men's national under-16 basketball team
