= Austria women's national under-16 basketball team =

Austria
- FIBA zone: FIBA Europe
- National federation: Austrian Basketball Federation

U17 World Cup
- Appearances: None

U16 EuroBasket
- Appearances: 1
- Medals: None

U16 EuroBasket Division B
- Appearances: 12
- Medals: None

U16 EuroBasket Division C
- Appearances: 1
- Medals: Gold: 1 (2018)

The Austria women's national under-16 basketball team is a national basketball team of Austria, administered by the Austrian Basketball Federation. It represents the country in international under-16 women's basketball competitions.

== FIBA U16 Women's EuroBasket participations ==
Year	Division A	Division B	Division C
1984	12th		
2005		16th	
2006		16th	
2009		19th	
2014		16th	
2015		15th	
2016		20th	
2018			1st place, gold medalist(s)
2019		19th	
2022		8th	
2023		12th	
2024		7th	
2025		14th	
2026		Rank 6 trio	

== See also ==
- Austria women's national basketball team
- Austria women's national under-18 basketball team
- Austria men's national under-16 basketball team
