= Portugal women's national under-16 and under-17 basketball team =

Portugal
- FIBA zone: FIBA Europe
- National federation: Portuguese Basketball Federation

U17 World Cup
- Appearances: 1
- Medals: None

U16 EuroBasket
- Appearances: 6
- Medals: Silver: 1 (2015)

U16 EuroBasket Division B
- Appearances: 16
- Medals: Silver: 2 (2013, 2019); Bronze: 1 (2010) ▲ Prom.: 1 (2026)

The Portugal women's national under-16 and under-17 basketball team is a national basketball team of Portugal, administered by the Portuguese Basketball Federation. It represents the country in international under-16 and under-17 women's basketball competitions.

== FIBA U16 Women's EuroBasket participations ==
Year	Division A	Division B
1991	12th	
2004		7th/8th
2005		14th
2006		15th
2007		11th
2008		10th
2009		8th
2010		3rd place, bronze medalist(s)
2011		7th
2012		4th
2013		2nd place, silver medalist(s)

Year	Division A	Division B
2014	13th	
2015	2nd place, silver medalist(s)	
2016	14th	
2017		6th
2018		7th
2019		2nd place, silver medalist(s)
2022	4th	
2023	16th	
2024		9th
2025		7th
2026		Rank 1 trio

== FIBA Under-17 Women's Basketball World Cup participations ==
Year	Result
2016	12th

== See also ==
- Portugal women's national basketball team
- Portugal women's national under-18 basketball team
- Portugal men's national under-16 basketball team
