= Slovenia women's national under-16 basketball team =

Slovenia
- FIBA zone: FIBA Europe
- National federation: KZS
- Coach: Robert Stojković

U17 World Cup
- Appearances: 2

U16 EuroBasket
- Appearances: 6
- Medals: Silver: 2 (2025, 2026)

U16 EuroBasket Division B
- Appearances: 16
- Medals: Gold: 1 (2019); Bronze: 1 (2007)

The Slovenia women's national under-16 and under-17 basketball team is a national basketball team of Slovenia, administered by the Basketball Federation of Slovenia. It represents the country in under-16 and under-17 women's international basketball competitions.

== Tournament record ==
=== U17 World Cup ===
Year	Pos.	Pld	W	L
(France) 2010	Did not qualify			
(Netherlands) 2012	Did not qualify			
(Czech Republic) 2014	Did not qualify			
(Spain) 2016	Did not qualify			
(Belarus) 2018	Did not qualify			
(Hungary) 2022	9th	7	5	2
(Mexico) 2024	Did not qualify			
(Czech Republic) 2026	8th	7	3	4
(Indonesia) 2028	To be determined			
Total	2/8	14	8	6

=== U16 EuroBasket ===
Year	Division A	Division B
1995	12th	
2004		11th/12th
2005		7th
2006		5th
2007		3rd place, bronze medalist(s)
2008		4th
2009		10th
2010		7th
2011		9th
2012		7th
2013		9th

Year	Division A	Division B
2014		4th
2015		4th
2016		12th
2017		11th
2018		8th
2019		1st place, gold medalist(s)
2022	11th	
2023	10th	
2024	6th	
2025	2nd place, silver medalist(s)	
2026	2nd place, silver medalist(s)	

== See also ==
- Slovenia women's national basketball team
- Slovenia women's national under-18 basketball team
- Slovenia men's national under-16 basketball team
