= Ukraine women's national under-16 basketball team =

Women's youth national basketball team

Ukraine
- FIBA zone: FIBA Europe
- National federation: Basketball Federation of Ukraine

U17 World Cup
- Appearances: None

U16 EuroBasket
- Appearances: 5
- Medals: Bronze: 1 (2003)

U16 EuroBasket Division B
- Appearances: 17
- Medals: Gold: 1 (2004)

The Ukraine women's national under-16 basketball team is a national basketball team of Ukraine, administered by the Basketball Federation of Ukraine. It represents the country in international under-16 women's basketball competitions.

== FIBA U16 Women's EuroBasket participations ==
Year	Division A	Division B
2003	3rd place, bronze medalist(s)	
2004		1st place, gold medalist(s)
2005	6th	
2006	8th	
2007	11th	
2008	16th	
2009		15th
2010		13th
2011		6th
2012		6th
2013		11th

Year	Division A	Division B
2014		8th
2015		12th
2016		14th
2017		4th
2018		10th
2019		7th
2022		13th
2023		11th
2024		16th
2025		15th
2026		Rank 3 trio

== See also ==
- Ukraine women's national basketball team
- Ukraine women's national under-18 basketball team
- Ukraine men's national under-17 basketball team
