= Israel women's national under-16 basketball team =

Youth national basketball team

Israel
- FIBA zone: FIBA Europe
- National federation: Israel Basketball Association

U17 World Cup
- Appearances: None

U16 EuroBasket
- Appearances: 7
- Medals: None

U16 EuroBasket Division B
- Appearances: 17
- Medals: Bronze: 1 (2022)

The Israel women's national under-16 basketball team is a national basketball team of Israel, administered by the Israel Basketball Association. It represents the country in international under-16 women's basketball competitions.

== FIBA U16 Women's EuroBasket record ==
Division A						Division B					
Year	Pos.	GP	W	L	Ref.	Year	Pos.	GP	W	L	Ref.
(Poland) 1976	11th	5	1	4		Not held					
(Spain) 1978	13th	7	1	6		Not held					
(Hungary) 1980	Did not qualify					Not held					
(Finland) 1982	11th	7	1	6		Not held					
(Italy) 1984	Did not qualify					Not held					
(Socialist Federal Republic of Yugoslavia) 1985	Did not qualify					Not held					
(Poland) 1987	Did not qualify					Not held					
(Romania) 1989	Did not qualify					Not held					
(Portugal) 1991	Did not qualify					Not held					
(Slovakia) 1993	Did not qualify					Not held					
(Poland) 1995	Did not qualify					Not held					
(Hungary) 1997	Did not qualify					Not held					
(Romania) 1999	Did not qualify					Not held					
(Bulgaria) 2001	Did not qualify					Not held					
(Turkey) 2003	Did not qualify					Not held					
(Italy) 2004	Did not qualify					(Bosnia and Herzegovina) 2004	5th/6th	7	5	2	
(Poland) 2005	Did not qualify					(Estonia) 2005	9th	8	6	2	
(Slovakia) 2006	Did not qualify					(Finland) 2006	10th	7	4	3	
(Latvia) 2007	Did not qualify					(Italy) 2007	4th	7	4	3	
(Poland) 2008	Did not qualify					(Bulgaria) 2008	17th	6	3	3	
(Italy) 2009	Did not qualify					(Estonia) 2009	13th	8	5	3	
(Greece) 2010	Did not qualify					(North Macedonia) 2010	10th	8	4	4	
(Italy) 2011	Did not qualify					(Romania) 2011	13th	7	3	4	
(Hungary) 2012	Did not qualify					(Estonia) 2012	9th	7	3	4	
(Bulgaria) 2013	Did not qualify					(Portugal) 2013	6th	7	3	4	
(Hungary) 2014	Did not qualify					(Estonia) 2014	12th	7	4	3	
(Portugal) 2015	Did not qualify					(North Macedonia) 2015	9th	8	6	2	
(Italy) 2016	Did not qualify					(Romania) 2016	4th	8	5	3	
(France) 2017	Did not qualify					(North Macedonia) 2017	9th	7	5	2	
(Lithuania) 2018	Did not qualify					(Montenegro) 2018	5th	8	7	1	
(North Macedonia) 2019	Did not qualify					(Bulgaria) 2019	11th	8	5	3	
(Portugal) 2022	Did not qualify					(Montenegro) 2022	3rd place, bronze medalist(s)	7	6	1	
(Turkey) 2023	12th	7	1	6							
(Hungary) 2024	12th	7	2	5							
(Romania) 2025	11th	7	2	5							
(Romania) 2026	13th	7	3	4							

== See also ==
- Israel women's national basketball team
- Israel women's national under-18 basketball team
- Israel men's national under-16 basketball team
