= 2012 FIBA Europe Under-16 Championship for Women Division B =

Tournament details
- Host country: Estonia
- City: Tallinn
- Dates: 12–22 July 2012
- Teams: 15 (from 1 confederation)
- Venue(s): 2 (in 1 host city)

Final positions
- Champions: Lithuania (1st title)
- Runners-up: Bulgaria
- Third place: Latvia

Official website
- www.fibaeurope.com

The 2012 FIBA Europe Under-16 Championship for Women Division B was the 9th edition of the Division B of the European basketball championship for women's national under-16 teams. It was played in Tallinn, Estonia, from 12 to 22 July 2012. Lithuania women's national under-16 basketball team won the tournament.

== Participating teams ==
- Belarus
- Bulgaria
- Denmark
- Estonia
- Finland ▼ (16th place, 2011 FIBA Europe Under-16 Championship for Women Division A)
- Israel
- Latvia
- Lithuania
- Luxembourg
- Norway
- Poland ▼ (15th place, 2011 FIBA Europe Under-16 Championship for Women Division A)
- Portugal
- Romania
- Slovenia
- Ukraine

== First round ==
In the first round, the teams were drawn into four groups. The first three teams from each group will advance to the second round (Groups E and F) and the other teams will advance to the 13th–15th place classification (Group G).

=== Group A ===
Pos	Team	Pld	W	L	PF	PA	PD	Pts	Qualification
1	Finland	3	3	0	174	143	+31	6	Second round
2	Portugal	3	2	1	178	146	+32	5	Second round
3	Ukraine	3	1	2	167	187	−20	4	Second round
4	Estonia	3	0	3	137	180	−43	3	13th–15th place classification

Source: FIBA Archive

=== Group B ===
Pos	Team	Pld	W	L	PF	PA	PD	Pts	Qualification
1	Lithuania	2	2	0	161	126	+35	4	Second round
2	Israel	2	1	1	139	142	−3	3	Second round
3	Denmark	2	0	2	112	144	−32	2	Second round

Source: FIBA Archive

=== Group C ===
Pos	Team	Pld	W	L	PF	PA	PD	Pts	Qualification
1	Poland	3	3	0	228	168	+60	6	Second round
2	Bulgaria	3	2	1	189	196	−7	5	Second round
3	Luxembourg	3	1	2	193	222	−29	4	Second round
4	Romania	3	0	3	201	225	−24	3	13th–15th place classification

Source: FIBA Archive

=== Group D ===
Pos	Team	Pld	W	L	PF	PA	PD	Pts	Qualification
1	Slovenia	3	3	0	210	132	+78	6	Second round
2	Latvia	3	2	1	195	119	+76	5	Second round
3	Belarus	3	1	2	169	140	+29	4	Second round
4	Norway	3	0	3	62	245	−183	3	13th–15th place classification

Source: FIBA Archive

== Second round ==
In the second round, the teams play in two groups of six. The first four teams from each group will advance to the Quarterfinals and the other teams will advance to the 9th–12th place playoffs.

=== Group E ===
Pos	Team	Pld	W	L	PF	PA	PD	Pts	Qualification
1	Finland	5	5	0	358	230	+128	10	Quarterfinals
2	Portugal	5	4	1	280	242	+38	9	Quarterfinals
3	Ukraine	5	3	2	288	286	+2	8	Quarterfinals
4	Lithuania	5	2	3	325	308	+17	7	Quarterfinals
5	Israel	5	1	4	258	335	−77	6	9th–12th place playoffs
6	Denmark	5	0	5	248	356	−108	5	9th–12th place playoffs

Source: FIBA Archive

=== Group F ===
Pos	Team	Pld	W	L	PF	PA	PD	Pts	Qualification
1	Poland	5	5	0	366	268	+98	10	Quarterfinals
2	Latvia	5	3	2	296	271	+25	8	Quarterfinals
3	Slovenia	5	3	2	304	273	+31	8	Quarterfinals
4	Bulgaria	5	3	2	301	317	−16	8	Quarterfinals
5	Luxembourg	5	1	4	292	346	−54	6	9th–12th place playoffs
6	Belarus	5	0	5	275	359	−84	5	9th–12th place playoffs

Source: FIBA Archive

== 13th–15th place classification ==
=== Group G ===
Pos	Team	Pld	W	L	PF	PA	PD	Pts
13	Estonia	4	4	0	295	192	+103	8
14	Romania	4	2	2	290	191	+99	6
15	Norway	4	0	4	130	332	−202	4

Source: FIBA Archive

== 9th–12th place playoffs ==
9th–12th place semifinals
E5	Israel	80
F6	Belarus	48
F5	Luxembourg	67
E6	Denmark	65

9th place match
E5	Israel	62
F5	Luxembourg	59
11th place match
F6	Belarus	71
E6	Denmark	77

== Championship playoffs ==
Fifth place
E3	Ukraine	64
F1	Poland	88
Seventh place
E1	Finland	41
F3	Slovenia	56

Consolation semifinals
E1	Finland	49
E3	Ukraine	50
F1	Poland	71
F3	Slovenia	66

Quarterfinals
E1	Finland	55
F4	Bulgaria	70
F2	Latvia	54
E3	Ukraine	52
F1	Poland	68
E4	Lithuania	71
E2	Portugal	58
F3	Slovenia	45

Semifinals
F4	Bulgaria	53
F2	Latvia	52
E4	Lithuania	65
E2	Portugal	48

Final
F4	Bulgaria	73
E4	Lithuania	86
Third place
F2	Latvia	42
E2	Portugal	35

== Final standings ==
Promoted to the 2013 FIBA Europe Under-16 Championship for Women Division A

Rank	Team
1st place, gold medalist(s)	Lithuania
2nd place, silver medalist(s)	Bulgaria
3rd place, bronze medalist(s)	Latvia
4	Portugal
5	Poland
6	Ukraine
7	Slovenia
8	Finland
9	Israel
10	Luxembourg
11	Denmark
12	Belarus
13	Estonia
14	Romania
15	Norway
