= Estonia women's national under-16 basketball team =

Women's youth national basketball team

Estonia
- FIBA zone: FIBA Europe
- National federation: Estonian Basketball Association

U17 World Cup
- Appearances: None

U16 EuroBasket
- Appearances: 1
- Medals: None

U16 EuroBasket Division B
- Appearances: 13
- Medals: Silver: 1 (2005)

The Estonia women's national under-16 basketball team is a national basketball team of Estonia, administered by the Estonian Basketball Association. It represents the country in international under-16 women's basketball competitions.

== FIBA U16 Women's EuroBasket participations ==
Year	Division A	Division B
2004		11th/12th
2005		2nd place, silver medalist(s)
2006	15th	
2008		16th
2009		14th
2011		10th
2012		13th

Year	Division A	Division B
2013		16th
2014		15th
2016		11th
2017		15th
2018		9th
2023		4th
2024		17th

== See also ==
- Estonia women's national basketball team
- Estonia women's national under-18 basketball team
- Estonia men's national under-16 basketball team
