= Denmark women's national under-16 basketball team =

National women's basketball team of Denmark

Denmark
- FIBA zone: FIBA Europe
- National federation: Danish Basketball Association

U17 World Cup
- Appearances: None

U16 EuroBasket
- Appearances: 4
- Medals: None

U16 EuroBasket Division B
- Appearances: 13
- Medals: Gold: 1 (2017); Bronze: 1 (2013)

The Denmark women's national under-16 basketball team is a national women's basketball team of Denmark, administered by the Danish Basketball Association (DBBF). It represents the country in international under-16 women's basketball competitions.

== FIBA U16 Women's EuroBasket participations ==
Year	Division A	Division B
2008		7th
2009		4th
2010		11th
2011		11th
2012		11th
2013		3rd place, bronze medalist(s)
2014	15th	
2015		11th
2016		16th

Year	Division A	Division B
2017		1st place, gold medalist(s)
2018	12th	
2019	13th	
2022	16th	
2023		13th
2024		6th
2025		12th
2026		Rank 3 trio

== See also ==
- Denmark women's national basketball team
- Denmark women's national under-18 basketball team
- Denmark men's national under-16 basketball team
