= England women's national under-16 basketball team =

Youth basketball team representing England

England
- FIBA zone: FIBA Europe
- National federation: Basketball England

U17 World Cup
- Appearances: None

U16 EuroBasket
- Appearances: 2
- Medals: None

U16 EuroBasket Division B
- Appearances: 11
- Medals: Silver: 2 (2011, 2014)

The England women's national under-16 basketball team is a national basketball team of England, administered by the Basketball England. It represents the country in women's international under-16 basketball competitions.

The team participated 11 times at the FIBA U16 Women's European Championship Division B. Their best results were the second places in 2011 and 2014. In 2012 and 2015, they participated at the FIBA U16 Women's European Championship Division A; in both occasions, they finished in 16th place.

== See also ==
- England women's national basketball team
- England women's national under-18 basketball team
- England men's national under-16 basketball team
