= 2025 FIBA U16 Women's EuroBasket Division B =

International youth basketball tournament

Tournament details
- Host country: Turkey
- City: Istanbul
- Dates: 20–29 August 2025
- Teams: 19 (from 1 confederation)
- Venues: 2 (in 1 host city)

Final positions
- Champions: Lithuania (3rd title)
- Runners-up: Bulgaria
- Third place: Turkey
- Fourth place: Switzerland

Tournament statistics
- Games played: 63
- Attendance: 4,721 (75 per game)
- MVP: (Lithuania) Gabija Galvanauskaitė
- Top scorer: (Iceland) Berglind Hlynsdóttir (154 Pts)

Official website
- www.fiba.basketball

The 2025 FIBA U16 Women's EuroBasket Division B was the 20th edition of the Division B of the European basketball championship for women's under-16 national teams. The tournament was played in Istanbul, Turkey, from 20 to 29 August 2025.

== Participating teams ==
- Austria
- Azerbaijan ▲ (Winners, 2024 FIBA U16 Women's EuroBasket Division C)
- Bosnia and Herzegovina
- Bulgaria
- Denmark
- Greece ▼ (15th place, 2024 FIBA U16 Women's EuroBasket Division A)
- Iceland
- Ireland
- Lithuania
- Luxembourg
- Netherlands
- North Macedonia
- Norway
- Portugal
- Slovakia
- Sweden ▼ (16th place, 2024 FIBA U16 Women's EuroBasket Division A)
- Switzerland
- Turkey
- Ukraine

== Referees ==
The following 27 referees were selected for the tournament.

- Gilbert Hoxha (ALB)
- Romana Rea Car (AUT)
- Urfan Bayramlı (AZE)
- Mia Dojčinović (BIH)
- Stefan Stefanov (BUL)
- Svetlana Stoyanova (BUL)
- Gao Yijie (CHN)
- Jiang Wenan (CHN)
- Nika Štampalija (CRO)
- Laure Coanus (FRA)
- Aikaterini Asimakaki (GRE)
- Jóhannes Páll Friðriksson (ISL)
- Elldin Uglari (KOS)
- Gabrielius Simonavičius (LTU)
- Lynn Weiwers (LUX)
- Alexandra Iurii (MDA)
- Radomir Vojinović (MNE)
- Zoran Mitrovski (MKD)
- Ema Nikochevikj (MKD)
- Alexander Svendberg (NOR)
- Diogo Martins (POR)
- Marija Ćirić (SRB)
- Eduard Uhrin (SVK)
- Çisil Güngör (TUR)
- Oleksandr Dotsenko (UKR)
- Oleksandr Oparin (UKR)
- Denys Povorozniuk (UKR)

== First round ==
The draw of the first round was held on 28 January 2025 in Freising, Germany.

In the first round, the teams were drawn into four groups. The first two teams from each group will advance to the quarterfinals; the third and fourth teams will advance to the 9th–16th place playoffs; the other teams will play in the 17th–19th place classification.

All times are local (Turkey Time; UTC+3).

=== Group A ===
Pos	Team	Pld	W	L	PF	PA	PD	Pts	Qualification
1	Turkey	4	4	0	266	151	+115	8	Quarterfinals
2	Switzerland	4	3	1	254	244	+10	7	Quarterfinals
3	Austria	4	2	2	256	260	−4	6	9th–16th place playoffs
4	Iceland	4	1	3	282	286	−4	5	9th–16th place playoffs
5	Ireland	4	0	4	192	309	−117	4	17th–19th place classification

Source: FIBA

20 August 2025
18:00

Boxscore

Turkey	52–29	Switzerland
Scoring by quarter: 16–9, 11–5, 17–6, 8–9
Pts: Demirer 13; Rebs: Demirer 20; Asts: Demirer 3		Pts: Akoa 14; Rebs: Bartel 8 Asts: Srdanovic, Gonin 2

Basketball Development Centre C2
Attendance: 250
Referees: Radomir Vojinović (MNE), Gao Yijie (CHN), Marija Ćirić (SRB)

20 August 2025
20:30

Boxscore

Ireland	48–84	Iceland
Scoring by quarter: 17–18, 12–34, 6–16, 13–16
Pts: Buckley 15; Rebs: Elliott 9 Asts: Elliott 4		Pts: Hlynsdóttir 27; Rebs: Hlynsdóttir 9 Asts: Hlynsdóttir 6

Basketball Development Centre C3
Attendance: 100
Referees: Oleksandr Dotsenko (UKR), Ema Nikochevikj (MKD), Eduard Uhrin (SVK)

21 August 2025
15:30

Boxscore

Austria	88–61	Ireland
Scoring by quarter: 21–15, 26–12, 22–13, 19–21
Pts: Kuranovic, Kunert 16; Rebs: Kuranovic 13; Asts: Oriakhi, Kunert 3		Pts: Hartigan 15; Rebs: Buckley, Hartigan 7 Asts: Buckley 5

Basketball Development Centre C3
Attendance: 70
Referees: Jiang Wenan (CHN), Oleksandr Oparin (UKR), Aikaterini Asimakaki (GRE)

21 August 2025
18:00

Boxscore

Iceland	59–84	Turkey
Scoring by quarter: 17–23, 14–26, 14–15, 14–20
Pts: Hlynsdóttir 19; Rebs: Benediktsdóttir 6 Asts: Brjánsdóttir 3		Pts: Demirer 31; Rebs: Demirer 23; Asts: Özek 6

Basketball Development Centre C2
Attendance: 320
Referees: Gabrielius Simonavičius (LTU), Gilbert Hoxha (ALB), Alexander Svendberg (NOR)

22 August 2025
15:30

Boxscore

Switzerland	82–76	Iceland
Scoring by quarter: 24–15, 26–14, 14–25, 18–22
Pts: Akoa 24; Rebs: Bartel 15; Asts: Akoa 5		Pts: Hlynsdóttir 25; Rebs: Hlynsdóttir 12; Asts: Hlynsdóttir 4

Basketball Development Centre C3
Attendance: 75
Referees: Zoran Mitrovski (MKD), Nika Štampalija (CRO), Alexandra Iurii (MDA)

22 August 2025
18:00

Boxscore

Turkey	68–36	Austria
Scoring by quarter: 9–10, 15–10, 17–9, 27–7
Pts: Demirer 19; Rebs: Demirer 18; Asts: Özek, Tura 4		Pts: Kunert 9 Rebs: Kunert 8 Asts: Kress 2

Basketball Development Centre C2
Attendance: 150
Referees: Oleksandr Dotsenko (UKR), Denys Povorozniuk (UKR), Urfan Bayramlı (AZE)

24 August 2025
15:30

Boxscore

Austria	60–68	Switzerland
Scoring by quarter: 11–16, 16–21, 11–18, 22–13
Pts: Kuranovic 27; Rebs: Kuranovic 16; Asts: Kittinger 3		Pts: Srdanovic 16; Rebs: Bartel, Clavel 10; Asts: Gonin 8

Basketball Development Centre C2
Attendance: 45
Referees: Oleksandr Oparin (UKR), Gabrielius Simonavičius (LTU), Marija Ćirić (SRB)

24 August 2025
18:00

Boxscore

Ireland	27–62	Turkey
Scoring by quarter: 5–16, 10–17, 0–19, 12–10
Pts: Buckley 8 Rebs: Buckley 6 Asts: Ademokun 2		Pts: Odabaşı 10; Rebs: Demirer 12; Asts: Şencan 3

Basketball Development Centre C2
Attendance: 250
Referees: Diogo Martins (POR), Lynn Weiwers (LUX), Alexandra Iurii (MDA)

25 August 2025
13:00

Boxscore

Iceland	63–72	Austria
Scoring by quarter: 8–20, 10–23, 9–15, 36–14
Pts: Brjánsdóttir 24; Rebs: Hlynsdóttir, Brjánsdóttir 6 Asts: Hlynsdóttir 6		Pts: Kuranovic 22; Rebs: Kuranovic 12; Asts: Kress 4

Basketball Development Centre C3
Attendance: 35
Referees: Oleksandr Dotsenko (UKR), Eduard Uhrin (SVK), Alexandra Iurii (MDA)

25 August 2025
15:30

Boxscore

Switzerland	75–56	Ireland
Scoring by quarter: 20–16, 19–8, 22–12, 14–20
Pts: Akoa 16; Rebs: Bartel, Gross 7 Asts: Srdanovic, Clavel 3		Pts: Buckley 17; Rebs: Djoussa 14; Asts: O'Connor 4

Basketball Development Centre C3
Attendance: 55
Referees: Laure Coanus (FRA), Svetlana Stoyanova (BUL), Aikaterini Asimakaki (GRE)

=== Group B ===
Pos	Team	Pld	W	L	PF	PA	PD	Pts	Qualification
1	Netherlands	4	4	0	319	246	+73	8	Quarterfinals
2	Slovakia	4	3	1	311	261	+50	7	Quarterfinals
3	Sweden	4	2	2	277	263	+14	6	9th–16th place playoffs
4	Luxembourg	4	1	3	251	296	−45	5	9th–16th place playoffs
5	Azerbaijan	4	0	4	220	312	−92	4	17th–19th place classification

Source: FIBA

20 August 2025
13:00

Boxscore

Sweden	87–54	Azerbaijan
Scoring by quarter: 23–18, 24–3, 23–18, 17–15
Pts: Ali Mohamed 14; Rebs: Darbo Pereira, Johansson 10; Asts: Frey 5		Pts: Shchukina 26; Rebs: Shchukina 10; Asts: Akbarzade, Aslan 3

Basketball Development Centre C3
Attendance: 50
Referees: Zoran Mitrovski (MKD), Alexander Svendberg (NOR), Aikaterini Asimakaki (GRE)

20 August 2025
13:00

Boxscore

Luxembourg	63–80	Netherlands
Scoring by quarter: 18–28, 12–18, 19–16, 14–18
Pts: Sabus 27; Rebs: Sabus 8 Asts: Gloden 4		Pts: four players 11; Rebs: Maxwell 14; Asts: Panka 8

Basketball Development Centre C2
Attendance: 50
Referees: Laure Coanus (FRA), Stefan Stefanov (BUL), Mia Dojčinović (BIH)

21 August 2025
15:30

Boxscore

Slovakia	92–59	Luxembourg
Scoring by quarter: 23–7, 24–17, 19–20, 26–15
Pts: Šafáriková, Piscová 19; Rebs: Duhaňová 8 Asts: Šafáriková 7		Pts: Agovic 15; Rebs: Gloden 13; Asts: Gloden 5

Basketball Development Centre C2
Attendance: 25
Referees: Zoran Mitrovski (MKD), Gao Yijie (CHN), Romana Rea Car (AUT)

21 August 2025
20:30

Boxscore

Netherlands	72–67	Sweden
Scoring by quarter: 18–19, 18–14, 17–16, 19–18
Pts: van Stein 23; Rebs: three players 5 Asts: Goren, Deul 5		Pts: Frey 13; Rebs: Punkki, Johansson 7 Asts: Rahm, Darbo Pereira 4

Basketball Development Centre C2
Attendance: 50
Referees: Çisil Güngör (TUR), Denys Povorozniuk (UKR), Nika Štampalija (CRO)

22 August 2025
15:30

Boxscore

Sweden	54–82	Slovakia
Scoring by quarter: 20–8, 11–17, 13–30, 10–27
Pts: Odiase 15; Rebs: Johansson 11; Asts: Olivares Gomez 8		Pts: Šafáriková, Piscová 15; Rebs: Duhaňová 7 Asts: three players 4

Basketball Development Centre C2
Attendance: 100
Referees: Laure Coanus (FRA), Jiang Wenan (CHN), Elldin Uglari (KOS)

22 August 2025
20:30

Boxscore

Azerbaijan	49–81	Netherlands
Scoring by quarter: 8–19, 13–20, 12–20, 16–22
Pts: Shchukina 28; Rebs: Shchukina 9 Asts: Akbarzade 3		Pts: Nanninga 13; Rebs: Klamer 7 Asts: Goren 7

Basketball Development Centre C3
Attendance: 30
Referees: Gabrielius Simonavičius (LTU), Jóhannes Páll Friðriksson (ISL), Romana Rea Car (AUT)

24 August 2025
15:30

Boxscore

Luxembourg	55–69	Sweden
Scoring by quarter: 22–18, 7–16, 19–20, 7–15
Pts: Sabus 19; Rebs: Sabus 12; Asts: three players 3		Pts: Johansson 22; Rebs: Punkki 13; Asts: Frey 5

Basketball Development Centre C3
Attendance: 30
Referees: Gao Yijie (CHN), Stefan Stefanov (BUL), Mia Dojčinović (BIH)

24 August 2025
18:00

Boxscore

Slovakia	70–62	Azerbaijan
Scoring by quarter: 13–17, 17–8, 21–16, 19–21
Pts: Šafáriková 17; Rebs: Lešková 14; Asts: Piscová 7		Pts: Shchukina 27; Rebs: Niftaliyeva 12; Asts: Akbarzade 8

Basketball Development Centre C3
Attendance: 30
Referees: Svetlana Stoyanova (BUL), Denys Povorozniuk (UKR), Ema Nikochevikj (MKD)

25 August 2025
20:30

Boxscore

Netherlands	86–67	Slovakia
Scoring by quarter: 22–18, 24–13, 18–19, 22–17
Pts: Kuijt 14; Rebs: three players 8 Asts: Goren 6		Pts: Piscová 18; Rebs: Duhaňová 9 Asts: Malá 4

Basketball Development Centre C3
Attendance: 30
Referees: Radomir Vojinović (MNE), Gabrielius Simonavičius (LTU), Alexander Svendberg (NOR)

25 August 2025
20:30

Boxscore

Azerbaijan	55–74	Luxembourg
Scoring by quarter: 14–22, 18–17, 13–20, 10–15
Pts: Shchukina 14; Rebs: Niftaliyeva 18; Asts: Shchukina 4		Pts: Baseggio 22; Rebs: Agovic 15; Asts: Gloden 9

Basketball Development Centre C2
Attendance: 30
Referees: Zoran Mitrovski (MKD), Elldin Uglari (KOS), Romana Rea Car (AUT)

=== Group C ===
Pos	Team	Pld	W	L	PF	PA	PD	Pts	Qualification
1	Bosnia and Herzegovina	3	3	0	190	176	+14	6	Quarterfinals
2	Portugal	3	2	1	171	148	+23	5	Quarterfinals
3	Denmark	3	1	2	180	181	−1	4	9th–16th place playoffs
4	Norway	3	0	3	139	175	−36	3	9th–16th place playoffs

Source: FIBA

20 August 2025
15:30

Boxscore

Denmark	60–45	Norway
Scoring by quarter: 13–9, 10–12, 19–9, 18–15
Pts: Sorensen 24; Rebs: Sundberg 9 Asts: S. Olsen 5		Pts: Svenningsen 19; Rebs: Skråmo 9 Asts: A. Bruås 6

Basketball Development Centre C2
Attendance: 50
Referees: Gabrielius Simonavičius (LTU), Oleksandr Oparin (UKR), Alexandra Iurii (MDA)

20 August 2025
15:30

Boxscore

Portugal	52–58	Bosnia and Herzegovina
Scoring by quarter: 16–14, 15–12, 11–15, 10–17
Pts: Coelho 17; Rebs: Mota 7 Asts: three players 3		Pts: Talić 21; Rebs: Talić 9 Asts: Mešinović, Karray 2

Basketball Development Centre C3
Attendance: 75
Referees: Jiang Wenan (CHN), Gilbert Hoxha (ALB), Urfan Bayramlı (AZE)

22 August 2025
13:00

Boxscore

Bosnia and Herzegovina	71–66	Denmark
Scoring by quarter: 12–23, 22–13, 14–19, 23–11
Pts: Karray 21; Rebs: Talić, Sofilj 13; Asts: Karray 4		Pts: Sorensen 18; Rebs: Sorensen 9 Asts: L. Olsen 4

Basketball Development Centre C3
Attendance: 50
Referees: Svetlana Stoyanova (BUL), Eduard Uhrin (SVK), Ema Nikochevikj (MKD)

22 August 2025
18:00

Boxscore

Norway	36–54	Portugal
Scoring by quarter: 12–11, 9–10, 4–21, 11–12
Pts: Risan 8 Rebs: Svenningsen 11; Asts: Benterud 2		Pts: Lopes 17; Rebs: Gonçalves 8 Asts: four players 2

Basketball Development Centre C3
Attendance: 30
Referees: Çisil Güngör (TUR), Stefan Stefanov (BUL), Aikaterini Asimakaki (GRE)

25 August 2025
13:00

Boxscore

Denmark	54–65	Portugal
Scoring by quarter: 14–22, 11–14, 11–17, 18–12
Pts: Sorensen 26; Rebs: Wortmann, Trzecieski 7 Asts: S. Olsen 4		Pts: Lopes, Marcelino 16; Rebs: Lopes 11; Asts: Lopes 5

Basketball Development Centre C2
Attendance: 75
Referees: Oleksandr Oparin (UKR), Lynn Weiwers (LUX), Stefan Stefanov (BUL)

25 August 2025
15:30

Boxscore

Bosnia and Herzegovina	61–58	Norway
Scoring by quarter: 19–12, 12–14, 17–16, 13–16
Pts: Jovičić 17; Rebs: Sofilj 11; Asts: Karray 3		Pts: Svenningsen 20; Rebs: Skråmo 14; Asts: Engebretsen 5

Basketball Development Centre C2
Attendance: 30
Referees: Jiang Wenan (CHN), Denys Povorozniuk (UKR), Jóhannes Páll Friðriksson (ISL)

=== Group D ===
Pos	Team	Pld	W	L	PF	PA	PD	Pts	Qualification
1	Lithuania	4	4	0	313	209	+104	8	Quarterfinals
2	Bulgaria	4	3	1	281	256	+25	7	Quarterfinals
3	Greece	4	2	2	253	249	+4	6	9th–16th place playoffs
4	Ukraine	4	1	3	242	251	−9	5	9th–16th place playoffs
5	North Macedonia	4	0	4	192	316	−124	4	17th–19th place classification

Source: FIBA

20 August 2025
18:00

Boxscore

Greece	76–47	North Macedonia
Scoring by quarter: 19–17, 22–10, 19–10, 16–10
Pts: Fousteri, Toumpaniari 11; Rebs: Ntokmetzi 9 Asts: Fousteri 6		Pts: Pislevska 10; Rebs: Ziba, Milosavljevikj 7 Asts: Koleva 5

Basketball Development Centre C3
Attendance: 25
Referees: Çisil Güngör (TUR), Nika Štampalija (CRO), Jóhannes Páll Friðriksson (ISL)

20 August 2025
20:30

Boxscore

Ukraine	59–69	Bulgaria
Scoring by quarter: 20–19, 15–15, 7–24, 17–11
Pts: Da. Murzova, Do. Murzova 14; Rebs: Da. Murzova 14; Asts: Da. Murzova 4		Pts: three players 15; Rebs: Koeva 12; Asts: Kichukova 6

Basketball Development Centre C2
Attendance: 50
Referees: Diogo Martins (POR), Lynn Weiwers (LUX), Elldin Uglari (KOS)

21 August 2025
18:00

Boxscore

Bulgaria	70–58	Greece
Scoring by quarter: 17–7, 11–22, 19–17, 23–12
Pts: Stanislavova 22; Rebs: Stanislavova 11; Asts: Kotseva, Bozova 6		Pts: Chousela 18; Rebs: Toumpaniari 10; Asts: Fousteri 9

Basketball Development Centre C3
Referees: Laure Coanus (FRA), Eduard Uhrin (SVK), Urfan Bayramlı (AZE)

21 August 2025
20:30

Boxscore

Lithuania	77–50	Ukraine
Scoring by quarter: 15–18, 22–13, 12–11, 28–8
Pts: Galvanauskaitė, Peleckytė 15; Rebs: Galvanauskaitė 10; Asts: Grunkytė 5		Pts: Dzihora 15; Rebs: Dzihora 11; Asts: Maksymchuk 3

Basketball Development Centre C3
Attendance: 50
Referees: Radomir Vojinović (MNE), Jóhannes Páll Friðriksson (ISL), Marija Ćirić (SRB)

22 August 2025
13:00

Boxscore

North Macedonia	62–80	Bulgaria
Scoring by quarter: 14–18, 15–22, 18–19, 15–21
Pts: Gruevska 18; Rebs: Koleva 7 Asts: Gruevska, Koleva 3		Pts: Kichukova 23; Rebs: Bozova 7 Asts: Bozova 9

Basketball Development Centre C2
Attendance: 30
Referees: Radomir Vojinović (MNE), Alexander Svendberg (NOR), Mia Dojčinović (BIH)

22 August 2025
20:30

Boxscore

Greece	54–70	Lithuania
Scoring by quarter: 14–12, 12–21, 14–20, 14–17
Pts: Toumpaniari 16; Rebs: Toumpaniari 16; Asts: Bekiri 4		Pts: Galvanauskaitė 25; Rebs: Galvanauskaitė 14; Asts: Kavaliauskaitė, Grunkytė 5

Basketball Development Centre C2
Attendance: 50
Referees: Gao Yijie (CHN), Diogo Martins (POR), Lynn Weiwers (LUX)

24 August 2025
20:30

Boxscore

Ukraine	62–65	Greece
Scoring by quarter: 10–24, 18–20, 16–11, 18–10
Pts: Maksymchuk 22; Rebs: Gulyamova 10; Asts: Dzihora 5		Pts: Fousteri 24; Rebs: Toumpaniari 19; Asts: Prodromidi 6

Basketball Development Centre C3
Attendance: 25
Referees: Gilbert Hoxha (ALB), Jiang Wenan (CHN), Romana Rea Car (AUT)

24 August 2025
20:30

Boxscore

Lithuania	89–43	North Macedonia
Scoring by quarter: 21–2, 31–12, 20–18, 17–11
Pts: Peleckytė 13; Rebs: Galvanauskaitė 14; Asts: Grunkytė 5		Pts: Pislevska 11; Rebs: Gruevska 4 Asts: three players 3

Basketball Development Centre C2
Attendance: 30
Referees: Laure Coanus (FRA), Urfan Bayramlı (AZE), Elldin Uglari (KOS)

25 August 2025
18:00

Boxscore

Bulgaria	62–77	Lithuania
Scoring by quarter: 15–22, 22–17, 17–20, 8–18
Pts: Bozova 12; Rebs: Teneva 3 Asts: Bozova 5		Pts: Galvanauskaitė 23; Rebs: Galvanauskaitė 14; Asts: three players 3

Basketball Development Centre C2
Attendance: 30
Referees: Çisil Güngör (TUR), Diogo Martins (POR), Marija Ćirić (SRB)

25 August 2025
18:00

Boxscore

North Macedonia	40–71	Ukraine
Scoring by quarter: 14–15, 9–15, 6–18, 11–23
Pts: Koleva 11; Rebs: Trajkovska 7 Asts: Koleva 5		Pts: Do. Murzova 22; Rebs: Da. Murzova 15; Asts: Do. Murzova, Dzihora 4

Basketball Development Centre C3
Attendance: 21
Referees: Gilbert Hoxha (ALB), Nika Štampalija (CRO), Mia Dojčinović (BIH)

== 17th–19th place classification ==
=== Group E ===
Pos	Team	Pld	W	L	PF	PA	PD	Pts
17	Ireland	2	1	1	125	117	+8	3
18	North Macedonia	2	1	1	127	131	−4	3
19	Azerbaijan	2	1	1	132	136	−4	3

Source: FIBA

27 August 2025
10:30

Boxscore

Ireland	62–64	Azerbaijan
Scoring by quarter: 12–21, 14–18, 27–14, 9–11
Pts: Djoussa, Hartigan 12; Rebs: Djoussa 11; Asts: four players 2		Pts: Akbarzade 21; Rebs: Shchukina 10; Asts: Shchukina 3

Basketball Development Centre C3
Attendance: 75
Referees: Oleksandr Oparin (UKR), Alexander Svendberg (NOR), Mia Dojčinović (BIH)

28 August 2025
10:30

Boxscore

Azerbaijan	68–74	North Macedonia
Scoring by quarter: 13–19, 12–21, 19–22, 24–12
Pts: Niftaliyeva 16; Rebs: Shchukina 16; Asts: Shchukina 6		Pts: Koleva 19; Rebs: Trajkovska 10; Asts: Koleva 5

Basketball Development Centre C3
Attendance: 20
Referees: Svetlana Stoyanova (BUL), Nika Štampalija (CRO), Elldin Uglari (KOS)

29 August 2025
9:30

Boxscore

North Macedonia	53–63	Ireland
Scoring by quarter: 10–8, 6–21, 24–17, 13–17
Pts: Koleva 14; Rebs: Milosavljevikj 11; Asts: Koleva 4		Pts: Buckley 12; Rebs: Buckley 12; Asts: Buckley 5

Basketball Development Centre C3
Attendance: 35
Referees: Eduard Uhrin (SVK), Jóhannes Páll Friðriksson (ISL), Alexandra Iurii (MDA)

== 9th–16th place playoffs ==
13th place match
Austria	60
Sweden	79
15th place match
Norway	38
Ukraine	80

13th–16th place semifinals
Austria	58
Norway	42
Sweden	76
Ukraine	52

9th–16th place quarterfinals
A3	Austria	61
B4	Luxembourg	74
D3	Greece	77
C4	Norway	39
B3	Sweden	77
A4	Iceland	102
C3	Denmark	55
D4	Ukraine	43

9th–12th place semifinals
Luxembourg	69
Greece	83
Iceland	62
Denmark	54

9th place match
Greece (OT)	77
Iceland	75
11th place match
Luxembourg	85
Denmark	74

=== 9th–16th place quarterfinals ===
27 August 2025
13:00

Boxscore

Sweden	77–102	Iceland
Scoring by quarter: 18–28, 20–26, 18–28, 21–20
Pts: Frey 16; Rebs: Johansson 9 Asts: Ali Mohamed 8		Pts: Hlynsdóttir 32; Rebs: Brjánsdóttir 8 Asts: Hlynsdóttir 9

Basketball Development Centre C3
Attendance: 35
Referees: Diogo Martins (POR), Lynn Weiwers (LUX), Aikaterini Asimakaki (GRE)

27 August 2025
15:30

Boxscore

Denmark	55–43	Ukraine
Scoring by quarter: 18–15, 15–8, 13–12, 9–8
Pts: Sorensen 17; Rebs: Noack 6 Asts: Trzecieski 5		Pts: Dzihora 11; Rebs: Da. Murzova 13; Asts: Glukhova, Maksymchuk 3

Basketball Development Centre C3
Attendance: 30
Referees: Urfan Bayramlı (AZE), Elldin Uglari (KOS), Romana Rea Car (AUT)

27 August 2025
18:00

Boxscore

Greece	77–39	Norway
Scoring by quarter: 17–4, 16–16, 22–10, 22–9
Pts: Toumpaniari 28; Rebs: Toumpaniari 10; Asts: Fousteri 10		Pts: Engebretsen 8 Rebs: Svenningsen 7 Asts: five players 1

Basketball Development Centre C3
Attendance: 30
Referees: Stefan Stefanov (BUL), Nika Štampalija (CRO), Alexandra Iurii (MDA)

27 August 2025
20:30

Boxscore

Austria	61–74	Luxembourg
Scoring by quarter: 21–23, 12–23, 13–15, 15–13
Pts: Kress 20; Rebs: Kuranovic 18; Asts: Kuranovic 5		Pts: Sabus 26; Rebs: Sabus 10; Asts: Wallenborn, Sabus 5

Basketball Development Centre C3
Attendance: 30
Referees: Gao Yijie (CHN), Jóhannes Páll Friðriksson (ISL), Ema Nikochevikj (MKD)

=== 13th–16th place semifinals ===
28 August 2025
13:00

Boxscore

Sweden	76–52	Ukraine
Scoring by quarter: 20–9, 25–8, 8–19, 23–16
Pts: Johansson 15; Rebs: Johansson 20; Asts: Ali Mohamed 5		Pts: Danyleiko 16; Rebs: Kolomiiets, Dzihora 6 Asts: Maksymchuk 4

Basketball Development Centre C3
Attendance: 15
Referees: Gabrielius Simonavičius (LTU), Jóhannes Páll Friðriksson (ISL), Ema Nikochevikj (MKD)

28 August 2025
15:30

Boxscore

Austria	58–42	Norway
Scoring by quarter: 17–6, 23–13, 12–12, 6–11
Pts: Kuranovic 12; Rebs: Kuranovic 14; Asts: Theodorovics, Kuranovic 3		Pts: Svenningsen 15; Rebs: four players 6 Asts: Julsgaard, Risan 2

Basketball Development Centre C3
Attendance: 25
Referees: Zoran Mitrovski (MKD), Lynn Weiwers (LUX), Aikaterini Asimakaki (GRE)

=== 15th place match ===
29 August 2025
12:00

Boxscore

Norway	38–80	Ukraine
Scoring by quarter: 7–25, 12–14, 10–24, 9–17
Pts: Svenningsen 12; Rebs: Skråmo 6 Asts: four players 2		Pts: Danyleiko 20; Rebs: Da. Murzova, Gulyamova 10; Asts: Dzihora 6

Basketball Development Centre C3
Attendance: 20
Referees: Gao Yijie (CHN), Romana Rea Car (AUT), Mia Dojčinović (BIH)

=== 13th place match ===
29 August 2025
14:30

Boxscore

Austria	60–79	Sweden
Scoring by quarter: 12–23, 11–18, 15–21, 22–17
Pts: Kuranovic 18; Rebs: Theodorovics, Kuranovic 7 Asts: Kress 5		Pts: Loman, Johansson 18; Rebs: Frey 11; Asts: Frey 9

Basketball Development Centre C3
Attendance: 20
Referees: Oleksandr Oparin (UKR), Stefan Stefanov (BUL), Alexander Svendberg (NOR)

=== 9th–12th place semifinals ===
28 August 2025
18:00

Boxscore

Iceland	62–54	Denmark
Scoring by quarter: 13–12, 13–16, 21–9, 15–17
Pts: Hlynsdóttir 18; Rebs: Brjánsdóttir 13; Asts: Benediktsdóttir 4		Pts: Trzecieski 17; Rebs: Trzecieski 12; Asts: S. Olsen 3

Basketball Development Centre C3
Attendance: 30
Referees: Diogo Martins (POR), Stefan Stefanov (BUL), Alexandra Iurii (MDA)

28 August 2025
20:30

Boxscore

Luxembourg	69–83	Greece
Scoring by quarter: 20–28, 16–26, 19–13, 14–16
Pts: Agovic 15; Rebs: Agovic 9 Asts: three players 4		Pts: Toumpaniari 23; Rebs: Toumpaniari 9 Asts: Fousteri 10

Basketball Development Centre C3
Attendance: 30
Referees: Oleksandr Oparin (UKR), Mia Dojčinović (BIH), Alexander Svendberg (NOR)

=== 11th place match ===
29 August 2025
17:00

Boxscore

Luxembourg	85–74	Denmark
Scoring by quarter: 23–15, 21–25, 17–11, 24–23
Pts: Sabus 32; Rebs: Agovic 13; Asts: Sabus 8		Pts: Sorensen 39; Rebs: Trzecieski 10; Asts: Trzecieski 5

Basketball Development Centre C3
Attendance: 30
Referees: Urfan Bayramlı (AZE), Marija Ćirić (SRB), Aikaterini Asimakaki (GRE)

=== 9th place match ===
29 August 2025
19:30

Boxscore

Greece	77–75 (OT)	Iceland
Scoring by quarter: 16–11, 14–18, 16–16, 19–20, Overtime: 12–10
Pts: Fousteri 17; Rebs: Toumpaniari 16; Asts: Fousteri 5		Pts: Eyþórsdóttir 23; Rebs: Hlynsdóttir 9 Asts: Bjarnadóttir 7

Basketball Development Centre C3
Attendance: 40
Referees: Oleksandr Dotsenko (UKR), Ema Nikochevikj (MKD), Elldin Uglari (KOS)

== Championship playoffs ==
5th place match
Slovakia (OT)	76
Netherlands	74
7th place match
Portugal	71
Bosnia and Herzegovina	40

5th–8th place semifinals
Slovakia	62
Portugal	55
Netherlands	87
Bosnia and Herzegovina	52

Quarterfinals
A1	Turkey	89
B2	Slovakia	47
D1	Lithuania	70
C2	Portugal	52
B1	Netherlands	53
A2	Switzerland	78
C1	Bosnia and Herzegovina	60
D2	Bulgaria	83

Semifinals
Turkey	49
Lithuania	63
Switzerland	52
Bulgaria	60

Final
Lithuania	77
Bulgaria	60
3rd place match
Turkey	54
Switzerland	46

=== Quarterfinals ===
27 August 2025
13:00

Boxscore

Bosnia and Herzegovina	60–83	Bulgaria
Scoring by quarter: 15–23, 17–15, 11–24, 17–21
Pts: Karray 17; Rebs: Sofilj 10; Asts: Mešinović 3		Pts: Stanislavova 19; Rebs: Bozova 7 Asts: Bozova 10

Basketball Development Centre C2
Attendance: 60
Referees: Radomir Vojinović (MNE), Laure Coanus (FRA), Gabrielius Simonavičius (LTU)

27 August 2025
15:30

Boxscore

Netherlands	53–78	Switzerland
Scoring by quarter: 18–22, 13–26, 9–17, 13–13
Pts: Klamer, Maxwell 11; Rebs: Klamer, van Stein 8 Asts: Nanninga 3		Pts: Srdanovic 34; Rebs: Srdanovic 7 Asts: three players 4

Basketball Development Centre C2
Attendance: 130
Referees: Çisil Güngör (TUR), Jiang Wenan (CHN), Eduard Uhrin (SVK)

27 August 2025
18:00

Boxscore

Turkey	89–47	Slovakia
Scoring by quarter: 15–11, 27–9, 30–6, 17–21
Pts: Secerlioğlu 23; Rebs: Demirer 14; Asts: Özkan 5		Pts: Moravčíková 9 Rebs: four players 4 Asts: three players 2

Basketball Development Centre C2
Attendance: 250
Referees: Zoran Mitrovski (MKD), Oleksandr Dotsenko (UKR), Svetlana Stoyanova (BUL)

27 August 2025
20:30

Boxscore

Lithuania	70–52	Portugal
Scoring by quarter: 20–7, 20–21, 21–11, 9–13
Pts: Galvanauskaitė 22; Rebs: Galvanauskaitė 17; Asts: Grunkytė 7		Pts: Lopes 11; Rebs: Coelho 7 Asts: Marcelino 3

Basketball Development Centre C2
Attendance: 60
Referees: Gilbert Hoxha (ALB), Denys Povorozniuk (UKR), Marija Ćirić (SRB)

=== 5th–8th place semifinals ===
28 August 2025
13:00

Boxscore

Netherlands	87–52	Bosnia and Herzegovina
Scoring by quarter: 22–20, 21–12, 24–10, 20–10
Pts: van Stein 19; Rebs: Klamer 10; Asts: Panka 5		Pts: Karray 24; Rebs: Sofilj 10; Asts: Nježić 2

Basketball Development Centre C2
Attendance: 75
Referees: Denys Povorozniuk (UKR), Gao Yijie (CHN), Romana Rea Car (AUT)

28 August 2025
15:30

Boxscore

Slovakia	62–55	Portugal
Scoring by quarter: 8–18, 16–12, 18–18, 20–7
Pts: Piscová 26; Rebs: Duhaňová, Lešková 8 Asts: three players 4		Pts: Coelho, Gonçalves 13; Rebs: Borgiotti 8 Asts: Garcia, Marcelino 3

Basketball Development Centre C2
Attendance: 50
Referees: Çisil Güngör (TUR), Laure Coanus (FRA), Urfan Bayramlı (AZE)

=== 7th place match ===
29 August 2025
13:00

Boxscore

Portugal	71–40	Bosnia and Herzegovina
Scoring by quarter: 14–14, 23–8, 11–6, 23–12
Pts: Lopes 16; Rebs: Mota 10; Asts: Vicente 6		Pts: Mešinović 8 Rebs: Konaković, Sofilj 6 Asts: Jovičić, Bilić 2

Basketball Development Centre C2
Attendance: 60
Referees: Gilbert Hoxha (ALB), Lynn Weiwers (LUX), Nika Štampalija (CRO)

=== 5th place match ===
29 August 2025
15:30

Boxscore

Slovakia	76–74 (OT)	Netherlands
Scoring by quarter: 15–16, 21–22, 18–9, 15–22, Overtime: 7–5
Pts: Safarikova 21; Rebs: Duhanova 8 Asts: three players 4		Pts: van Stein 15; Rebs: Klamer, van Stein 12; Asts: Deul 7

Basketball Development Centre C2
Attendance: 95
Referees: Diogo Martins (POR), Jiang Wenan (CHN), Svetlana Stoyanova (BUL)

=== Semifinals ===
28 August 2025
18:00

Boxscore

Turkey	49–63	Lithuania
Scoring by quarter: 10–18, 17–14, 8–18, 14–13
Pts: Secerlioğlu 12; Rebs: Tanrıverdi 11; Asts: Şencan 5		Pts: Peleckytė 21; Rebs: Galvanauskaitė 19; Asts: Gurevičiūtė, Peleckytė 2

Basketball Development Centre C2
Attendance: 250
Referees: Radomir Vojinović (MNE), Jiang Wenan (CHN), Eduard Uhrin (SVK)

28 August 2025
20:30

Boxscore

Switzerland	52–60	Bulgaria
Scoring by quarter: 20–11, 9–16, 8–11, 15–22
Pts: Srdanovic 13; Rebs: Bartel 12; Asts: Srdanovic 7		Pts: Kotseva 17; Rebs: Stanislavova 14; Asts: Bozova 5

Basketball Development Centre C2
Attendance: 30
Referees: Oleksandr Dotsenko (UKR), Gilbert Hoxha (ALB), Marija Ćirić (SRB)

=== 3rd place match ===
29 August 2025
18:00

Boxscore

Turkey	54–46	Switzerland
Scoring by quarter: 11–20, 19–6, 12–10, 12–10
Pts: Tanrıverdi 19; Rebs: Secerlioğlu 18; Asts: Secerlioğlu 3		Pts: Srdanovic 17; Rebs: Clavel 9 Asts: Srdanovic, Gonin 2

Basketball Development Centre C2
Attendance: 300
Referees: Zoran Mitrovski (MKD), Gabrielius Simonavičius (LTU), Denys Povorozniuk (UKR)

=== Final ===
29 August 2025
20:30

Boxscore

Lithuania	77–60	Bulgaria
Scoring by quarter: 16–14, 15–18, 25–17, 21–11
Pts: Gurevičiūtė 23; Rebs: Galvanauskaitė 21; Asts: Peleckytė 6		Pts: Bozova 20; Rebs: Stanislavova 7 Asts: Bozova 6

Basketball Development Centre C2
Attendance: 500
Referees: Radomir Vojinović (MNE), Çisil Güngör (TUR), Laure Coanus (FRA)

== Final standings ==
Rank	Team	Record
1st place, gold medalist(s)	Lithuania	7–0
2nd place, silver medalist(s)	Bulgaria	5–2
3rd place, bronze medalist(s)	Turkey	6–1
4	Switzerland	4–3
5	Slovakia	5–2
6	Netherlands	5–2
7	Portugal	3–3
8	Bosnia and Herzegovina	3–3
9	Greece	5–2
10	Iceland	3–4
11	Luxembourg	3–4
12	Denmark	2–4
13	Sweden	4–3
14	Austria	3–4
15	Ukraine	2–5
16	Norway	0–6
17	Ireland	1–5
18	North Macedonia	1–5
19	Azerbaijan	1–5

Promoted to the 2026 FIBA U16 Women's EuroBasket Division A

== Statistics and awards ==
=== Statistical leaders ===
==== Players ====
Points

Name	PPG
(Denmark) Mille Boje Sorensen	23.0
(Iceland) Berglind Katla Hlynsdóttir	22.0
(Azerbaijan) Polina Shchukina	19.2
(Lithuania) Gabija Galvanauskaitė	19.0
(Luxembourg) Santana Sabus	18.1

Blocks

Name	BPG
(Netherlands) Milua Klamer	4.0
(Sweden) Tyra Johansson	2.1
(Lithuania) Gabija Galvanauskaitė	2.1
(Switzerland) Evi Bartel	2.0
(Austria) Sophia Kuranovic	2.0
(Slovakia) Nikola Lešková	2.0

Rebounds

Name	RPG
(Turkey) Ayşe Melek Demirer	17.4
(Lithuania) Gabija Galvanauskaitė	15.6
(Austria) Sophia Kuranovic	12.1
(Greece) Evgenia Toumpaniari	12.0
(Sweden) Tyra Johansson	11.0

Steals

Name	SPG
(Switzerland) Scya Srdanovic	6.4
(Luxembourg) Santana Sabus	5.3
(Iceland) Berglind Katla Hlynsdóttir	4.7
(Bulgaria) Deyana Stanislavova	4.4
(Bosnia and Herzegovina) Merjem Karray	4.3

Assists

Name	APG
(Greece) Efthymia Fousteri	6.6
(Bulgaria) Katrina Bozova	6.6
(Iceland) Berglind Katla Hlynsdóttir	4.7
(Luxembourg) Marie Gloden	4.4
(Sweden) Lisen Frey	4.2

Efficiency

Name	EFFPG
(Turkey) Ayşe Melek Demirer	29.2
(Lithuania) Gabija Galvanauskaitė	26.4
(Greece) Evgenia Toumpaniari	24.0
(Iceland) Berglind Katla Hlynsdóttir	22.6
(Austria) Sophia Kuranovic	21.7

==== Teams ====
Points

Name	PPG
Netherlands	76.1
Lithuania	74.7
Iceland	74.4
Sweden	72.7
Slovakia	70.9

Blocks

Name	BPG
Netherlands	6.3
Slovakia	5.0
Lithuania	5.0
Sweden	4.6
Austria	4.4
Ukraine	4.4

Rebounds

Name	RPG
Netherlands	57.9
Sweden	54.4
Ireland	54.0
Turkey	54.0
Lithuania	53.7

Steals

Name	SPG
Netherlands	19.4
Luxembourg	19.0
Slovakia	19.0
Iceland	17.9
Bosnia and Herzegovina	17.5

Assists

Name	APG
Netherlands	21.1
Greece	20.4
Sweden	20.0
Luxembourg	19.5
Bulgaria	19.1

Efficiency

Name	EFFPG
Netherlands	86.7
Lithuania	83.6
Greece	79.0
Sweden	77.9
Turkey	77.0

=== Awards ===
The awards were announced on 23 August 2025.

Award	Player
All-Tournament Team	(Lithuania) Gabija Galvanauskaitė
All-Tournament Team	(Bulgaria) Deyana Stanislavova
All-Tournament Team	(Turkey) Ayşe Demirer
All-Tournament Team	(Iceland) Berglind Hlynsdóttir
All-Tournament Team	(Switzerland) Scya Srdanovic
Most Valuable Player	(Lithuania) Gabija Galvanauskaitė
