= 2026 FIBA U16 Women's EuroBasket Division B =

International youth basketball tournament

Tournament details
- Host countries: Slovakia (T1); Luxembourg (T2); Greece (T3)
- Cities: Piešťany (T1); Bertrange (T2); Ioannina (T3)
- Dates: 6–22 August 2026
- Teams: 19 (from 1 confederation)
- Venues: 3 (in 3 host cities)

Final positions
- Champions: Belgium (T1); Portugal (T2); Greece (T3)

Official website
- www.fiba.basketball

The 2026 FIBA U16 Women's EuroBasket Division B was the 21st edition of the Division B of the European basketball championship for women's under-16 national teams. The event was played in Ioannina, Greece, Bertrange, Luxembourg and Piešťany, Slovakia, from 6 to 22 August 2026.

This year, Division B was played in a new format; there were three separate tournaments, the winners of which were promoted to the 2027 Division A.

== Participating teams ==
- Austria
- Azerbaijan
- Belgium ▼ (15th place, 2025 FIBA U16 Women's EuroBasket Division A)
- Bosnia and Herzegovina
- Cyprus ▲ (Winners, 2025 FIBA U16 Women's EuroBasket Division C)
- Denmark
- Finland ▼ (16th place, 2025 FIBA U16 Women's EuroBasket Division A)
- Great Britain ▼ (14th place, 2025 FIBA U16 Women's EuroBasket Division A)
- Greece
- Iceland
- Ireland
- Luxembourg
- Netherlands
- Norway
- Portugal
- Slovakia
- Sweden
- Switzerland
- Ukraine

== Tournament 1 ==
All times are local (Central European Summer Time; UTC+2).

=== Group phase ===
==== Group A ====
Pos	Team	Pld	W	L	PF	PA	PD	Pts	Qualification
1	Belgium	3	3	0	248	137	+111	6	Semifinals
2	Switzerland	3	2	1	189	179	+10	5	Semifinals
3	Bosnia and Herzegovina	3	1	2	180	218	−38	4	5th–7th place classification
4	Cyprus	3	0	3	134	217	−83	3	5th–7th place classification

Source: FIBA

10 August 2026
14:00

Boxscore

Bosnia and Herzegovina	65–57	Cyprus
Scoring by quarter: 21–16, 15–14, 17–11, 12–16

Diplomat aréna, Piešťany
Attendance: 40

10 August 2026
16:30

Boxscore

Switzerland	54–70	Belgium
Scoring by quarter: 11–25, 7–13, 21–20, 15–12

Diplomat aréna, Piešťany
Attendance: 124

11 August 2026
14:00

Boxscore

Cyprus	45–59	Switzerland
Scoring by quarter: 14–19, 10–15, 7–8, 14–17

Diplomat aréna, Piešťany
Attendance: 85

11 August 2026
16:30

Boxscore

Belgium	85–51	Bosnia and Herzegovina
Scoring by quarter: 21–15, 24–9, 25–9, 15–18

Diplomat aréna, Piešťany
Attendance: 50

12 August 2026
14:00

Boxscore

Bosnia and Herzegovina	64–76	Switzerland
Scoring by quarter: 23–12, 12–25, 16–20, 13–19

Diplomat aréna, Piešťany
Attendance: 80

12 August 2026
16:30

Boxscore

Belgium	93–32	Cyprus
Scoring by quarter: 23–6, 26–9, 21–9, 23–8

Diplomat aréna, Piešťany
Attendance: 72

==== Group B ====
Pos	Team	Pld	W	L	PF	PA	PD	Pts	Qualification
1	Sweden	2	2	0	137	88	+49	4	Semifinals
2	Slovakia (H)	2	1	1	117	123	−6	3	Semifinals
3	Azerbaijan	2	0	2	80	123	−43	2	5th–7th place classification

Source: FIBA
(H) Hosts

10 August 2026
19:00

Boxscore

Slovakia	59–50	Azerbaijan
Scoring by quarter: 21–15, 11–13, 10–17, 17–5

Diplomat aréna, Piešťany
Attendance: 254

11 August 2026
19:00

Boxscore

Azerbaijan	30–64	Sweden
Scoring by quarter: 11–13, 5–19, 6–18, 8–14

Diplomat aréna, Piešťany
Attendance: 157

12 August 2026
19:00

Boxscore

Sweden	73–58	Slovakia
Scoring by quarter: 14–15, 27–13, 18–13, 14–17

Diplomat aréna, Piešťany
Attendance: 412

=== 5th–7th place classification ===
Pos	Team	Pld	W	L	PF	PA	PD	Pts
5	Azerbaijan	2	2	0	148	123	+25	4
6	Bosnia and Herzegovina	2	1	1	130	135	−5	3
7	Cyprus	2	0	2	115	135	−20	2

Source: FIBA

Note: The following match was carried over from the first round: BIH v. CYP 65–57.

14 August 2026
14:00

Boxscore

Azerbaijan	78–65	Bosnia and Herzegovina
Scoring by quarter: 24–12, 21–12, 12–27, 21–14

Diplomat aréna, Piešťany
Attendance: 20

15 August 2026
12:00

Boxscore

Cyprus	58–70	Azerbaijan
Scoring by quarter: 12–27, 15–10, 18–21, 13–12

Diplomat aréna, Piešťany
Attendance: 50

=== 1st–4th place playoffs ===
Semifinals
14 August
A1	Belgium	73
B2	Slovakia	56
14 August
B1	Sweden	57
A2	Switzerland	54

Final
15 August
Belgium	75
Sweden	57
3rd place match
15 August
Slovakia	61
Switzerland	49

==== Semifinals ====
14 August 2026
16:30

Boxscore

Sweden	57–54	Switzerland
Scoring by quarter: 16–13, 10–14, 16–15, 15–12

Diplomat aréna, Piešťany
Attendance: 100

14 August 2026
19:00

Boxscore

Belgium	73–56	Slovakia
Scoring by quarter: 15–14, 27–7, 13–20, 18–15

Diplomat aréna, Piešťany
Attendance: 400

==== 3rd place match ====
15 August 2026
14:30

Boxscore

Slovakia	61–49	Switzerland
Scoring by quarter: 13–15, 17–9, 15–12, 16–13

Diplomat aréna, Piešťany
Attendance: 250

==== Final ====
15 August 2026
17:00

Boxscore

Belgium	75–57	Sweden
Scoring by quarter: 25–8, 27–7, 10–13, 13–29

Diplomat aréna, Piešťany
Attendance: 100

=== Final standings ===
Rank	Team
(gold) (1-3)	Belgium
(silver) (4-6)	Sweden
(bronze) (7-9)	Slovakia
4 (10-12)	Switzerland
5 (13)	Azerbaijan
6 (16)	Bosnia and Herzegovina
7 (19)	Cyprus

Promoted to the 2027 FIBA U16 Women's EuroBasket Division A

== Tournament 2 ==
All times are local (Central European Summer Time; UTC+2).

=== Group phase ===
==== Group C ====
Pos	Team	Pld	W	L	PF	PA	PD	Pts	Qualification
1	Finland	2	2	0	163	145	+18	4	Semifinals
2	Ukraine	2	1	1	146	123	+23	3	Semifinals
3	Austria	2	0	2	113	154	−41	2	5th place match

Source: FIBA

17 August 2026
16:00

Boxscore

Austria	42–72	Ukraine
Scoring by quarter: 10–15, 11–10, 11–31, 10–16

Salle des Sports Bertrange
Attendance: 145

18 August 2026
16:00

Boxscore

Ukraine	74–81	Finland
Scoring by quarter: 22–10, 18–31, 16–19, 18–21

Salle des Sports Bertrange
Attendance: 169

19 August 2026
16:00

Boxscore

Finland	82–71	Austria
Scoring by quarter: 20–20, 16–18, 19–19, 27–14

Salle des Sports Bertrange
Attendance: 51

==== Group D ====
Pos	Team	Pld	W	L	PF	PA	PD	Pts	Qualification
1	Portugal	2	2	0	184	103	+81	4	Semifinals
2	Netherlands	2	1	1	148	147	+1	3	Semifinals
3	Luxembourg (H)	2	0	2	104	186	−82	2	5th place match

Source: FIBA
(H) Hosts

17 August 2026
18:30

Boxscore

Netherlands	85–64	Luxembourg
Scoring by quarter: 22–13, 21–29, 16–15, 26–7

Salle des Sports Bertrange
Attendance: 300

18 August 2026
18:30

Boxscore

Luxembourg	40–101	Portugal
Scoring by quarter: 12–31, 9–20, 8–22, 11–28

Salle des Sports Bertrange
Attendance: 400

19 August 2026
18:30

Boxscore

Portugal	83–63	Netherlands
Scoring by quarter: 27–20, 19–14, 15–13, 22–16

Salle des Sports Bertrange
Attendance: 200

=== 5th place match ===
22 August 2026
12:00

Boxscore

Austria	77–85	Luxembourg
Scoring by quarter: 27–16, 16–24, 13–22, 21–23

Salle des Sports Bertrange
Attendance: 500

=== 1st–4th place playoffs ===
Semifinals
21 August
C1	Finland	73
D2	Netherlands	65
21 August
D1	Portugal	66
C2	Ukraine	63

Final
22 August
Finland	57
Portugal	65
3rd place match
22 August
Netherlands	67
Ukraine	77

==== Semifinals ====
21 August 2026
16:00

Boxscore

Finland	73–65	Netherlands
Scoring by quarter: 16–16, 17–15, 17–14, 23–20

Salle des Sports Bertrange
Attendance: 130

21 August 2026
18:30

Boxscore

Portugal	66–63	Ukraine
Scoring by quarter: 14–12, 19–13, 14–21, 19–17

Salle des Sports Bertrange
Attendance: 200

==== 3rd place match ====
22 August 2026
14:30

Boxscore

Netherlands	67–77	Ukraine
Scoring by quarter: 20–21, 15–17, 12–27, 20–12

Salle des Sports Bertrange
Attendance: 93

==== Final ====
22 August 2026
17:00

Boxscore

Finland	57–65	Portugal
Scoring by quarter: 16–13, 17–14, 12–20, 12–18

Salle des Sports Bertrange
Attendance: 154

=== Final standings ===
Rank	Team
(gold) (1-3)	Portugal
(silver) (4-6)	Finland
(bronze) (7-9)	Ukraine
4 (10-12)	Netherlands
5 (14,15)	Luxembourg
6 (17,18)	Austria

Promoted to the 2027 FIBA U16 Women's EuroBasket Division A

== Tournament 3 ==
All times are local (Eastern European Summer Time; UTC+3).

=== Group phase ===
==== Group E ====
Pos	Team	Pld	W	L	PF	PA	PD	Pts	Qualification
1	Greece (H)	2	2	0	152	101	+51	4	Semifinals
2	Denmark	2	1	1	133	110	+23	3	Semifinals
3	Ireland	2	0	2	72	146	−74	2	5th place match

Source: FIBA
(H) Hosts

6 August 2026
19:30

Boxscore

Denmark	68–36	Ireland
Scoring by quarter: 16–11, 17–9, 18–7, 17–9

Neo Kleisto Gymnastirio, Ioannina
Attendance: 100

7 August 2026
19:30

Boxscore

Ireland	36–78	Greece
Scoring by quarter: 7–25, 11–13, 11–23, 7–17

Neo Kleisto Gymnastirio, Ioannina
Attendance: 700

8 August 2026
19:30

Boxscore

Greece	74–65	Denmark
Scoring by quarter: 20–18, 14–13, 17–15, 23–19

Neo Kleisto Gymnastirio, Ioannina
Attendance: 600

==== Group F ====
Pos	Team	Pld	W	L	PF	PA	PD	Pts	Qualification
1	Iceland	2	2	0	152	118	+34	4	Semifinals
2	Norway	2	1	1	124	140	−16	3	Semifinals
3	Great Britain	2	0	2	119	137	−18	2	5th place match

Source: FIBA

6 August 2026
17:00

Boxscore

Iceland	80–59	Norway
Scoring by quarter: 23–15, 17–16, 17–12, 23–16

Neo Kleisto Gymnastirio, Ioannina
Attendance: 100

7 August 2026
17:00

Boxscore

Norway	65–60	Great Britain
Scoring by quarter: 21–17, 15–20, 19–6, 10–17

Neo Kleisto Gymnastirio, Ioannina
Attendance: 500

8 August 2026
17:00

Boxscore

Great Britain	59–72	Iceland
Scoring by quarter: 22–22, 14–19, 12–13, 11–18

Neo Kleisto Gymnastirio, Ioannina
Attendance: 100

=== 5th place match ===
11 August 2026
16:00

Boxscore

Ireland	63–91	Great Britain
Scoring by quarter: 12–31, 17–17, 15–25, 19–18

Neo Kleisto Gymnastirio, Ioannina
Attendance: 234

=== 1st–4th place playoffs ===
Semifinals
10 August
E1	Greece	82
F2	Norway	52
10 August
F1	Iceland	87
E2	Denmark	78

Final
11 August
Greece	75
Iceland	72
3rd place match
11 August
Norway	66
Denmark	80

==== Semifinals ====
10 August 2026
17:00

Boxscore

Iceland	87–78	Denmark
Scoring by quarter: 24–18, 22–24, 17–13, 24–23

Neo Kleisto Gymnastirio, Ioannina
Attendance: 312

10 August 2026
19:30

Boxscore

Greece	82–52	Norway
Scoring by quarter: 14–7, 24–19, 20–13, 24–13

Neo Kleisto Gymnastirio, Ioannina
Attendance: 695

==== 3rd place match ====
11 August 2026
18:30

Boxscore

Norway	66–80	Denmark
Scoring by quarter: 17–23, 13–12, 17–26, 19–19

Neo Kleisto Gymnastirio, Ioannina
Attendance: 289

==== Final ====
11 August 2026
21:00

Boxscore

Greece	75–72	Iceland
Scoring by quarter: 21–19, 24–18, 23–12, 7–23

Neo Kleisto Gymnastirio, Ioannina
Attendance: 711

=== Final standings ===
Rank	Team
(gold) (1-3)	Greece
(silver) (4-6)	Iceland
(bronze) (7-9)	Denmark
4 (10-12)	Norway
5 (14,15)	Great Britain
6 (17,18)	Ireland

Promoted to the 2027 FIBA U16 Women's EuroBasket Division A
