= 2022 FIBA U16 Women's European Championship Division C =

Tournament details
- Host country: Albania
- City: Korçë
- Dates: 12–17 July 2022
- Teams: 6 (from 1 confederation)
- Venue(s): 1 (in 1 host city)

Final positions
- Champions: Cyprus (4th title)
- Runners-up: Armenia
- Third place: Malta

Official website
- www.fiba.basketball

The 2022 FIBA U16 Women's European Championship Division C was the 16th edition of the Division C of the FIBA U16 Women's European Championship, the third tier of the European women's under-16 basketball championship. It was played from 12 to 17 July 2022 in Korçë, Albania. Cyprus women's national under-16 basketball team won the tournament.

== Participating teams ==
- Albania ▼ (23rd place, 2019 FIBA U16 Women's European Championship Division B)
- Andorra
- Armenia
- Cyprus
- Malta
- Moldova

== First round ==
The draw of the first round was held on 15 February 2022 in Freising, Germany.

In the first round, the teams were drawn into two groups of three. All teams advance to the playoffs. The winners of both groups advance directly to the semifinals; the other teams will play the quarterfinals.

=== Group A ===
Pos	Team	Pld	W	L	PF	PA	PD	Pts	Qualification
1	Malta	2	2	0	109	94	+15	4	Semifinals
2	Andorra	2	1	1	122	105	+17	3	Quarterfinals
3	Albania	2	0	2	86	118	−32	2	Quarterfinals

Source: FIBA

12 July 2022

Boxscore

Malta	52–38	Albania

Tamara Nikolla Sports Palace, Korçë

13 July 2022

Boxscore

Albania	48–66	Andorra

Tamara Nikolla Sports Palace, Korçë

14 July 2022

Boxscore

Andorra	56–57	Malta

Tamara Nikolla Sports Palace, Korçë

=== Group B ===
Pos	Team	Pld	W	L	PF	PA	PD	Pts	Qualification
1	Cyprus	2	2	0	143	93	+50	4	Semifinals
2	Armenia	2	1	1	114	105	+9	3	Quarterfinals
3	Moldova	2	0	2	83	142	−59	2	Quarterfinals

Source: FIBA

12 July 2022

Boxscore

Cyprus	81–40	Moldova

Tamara Nikolla Sports Palace, Korçë

13 July 2022

Boxscore

Moldova	43–61	Armenia

Tamara Nikolla Sports Palace, Korçë

14 July 2022

Boxscore

Armenia	53–62	Cyprus

Tamara Nikolla Sports Palace, Korçë

== Playoffs ==
Quarterfinals
B2	Armenia	67
A3	Albania	41
A2	Andorra	66
B3	Moldova	43

Semifinals
A1	Malta	51
B2	Armenia	75
B1	Cyprus	68
A2	Andorra	24
5th place match
B3	Moldova	52
A3	Albania	61

Final
B2	Armenia	42
B1	Cyprus	58
3rd place match
A1	Malta	64
A2	Andorra	47

=== Quarterfinals ===
15 July 2022

Boxscore

Andorra	66–43	Moldova

Tamara Nikolla Sports Palace, Korçë

15 July 2022

Boxscore

Armenia	67–41	Albania

Tamara Nikolla Sports Palace, Korçë

=== Semifinals ===
16 July 2022

Boxscore

Malta	51–75	Armenia

Tamara Nikolla Sports Palace, Korçë

16 July 2022

Boxscore

Cyprus	68–24	Andorra

Tamara Nikolla Sports Palace, Korçë

=== 5th place match ===
17 July 2022

Boxscore

Moldova	52–61	Albania

Tamara Nikolla Sports Palace, Korçë

=== 3rd place match ===
17 July 2022

Boxscore

Malta	64–47	Andorra

Tamara Nikolla Sports Palace, Korçë

=== Final ===
17 July 2022

Boxscore

Armenia	42–58	Cyprus

Tamara Nikolla Sports Palace, Korçë

== Final standings ==
Rank	Team
1st place, gold medalist(s)	Cyprus
2nd place, silver medalist(s)	Armenia
3rd place, bronze medalist(s)	Malta
4	Andorra
5	Albania
6	Moldova

Promoted to the 2023 FIBA U16 Women's European Championship Division B
