= Albania women's national under-16 basketball team =

Albania
- FIBA zone: FIBA Europe

U17 World Cup
- Appearances: None

U16 EuroBasket
- Appearances: None

U16 EuroBasket Division B
- Appearances: 6
- Medals: None

U16 EuroBasket Division C
- Appearances: 6
- Medals: Silver: 2 (2008, 2026); Bronze: 2 (2024, 2025)

The Albania women's national under-16 basketball team is a national basketball team of Albania, administered by the Albanian Basketball Federation (FSHB) (Albanian: Federata Shqiptare e Basketbollit). It represents the country in international under-16 women's basketball competitions.

== FIBA U16 Women's EuroBasket participations ==
Year	Division B	Division C
2004	15th/16th	
2008		2nd place, silver medalist(s)
2015	20th	
2016	23rd	
2017	21st	
2018	23rd	

Year	Division B	Division C
2019	23rd	
2022		5th
2023		5th
2024		3rd place, bronze medalist(s)
2025		3rd place, bronze medalist(s)
2026		2nd place, silver medalist(s)

== See also ==
- Albania women's national basketball team
- Albania women's national under-18 basketball team
- Albania men's national under-16 basketball team
