= 2022 FIBA U16 Women's European Championship Division B =

Tournament details
- Host country: Montenegro
- City: Podgorica
- Dates: 18–27 August 2022
- Teams: 19 (from 1 confederation)
- Venues: 2 (in 1 host city)

Final positions
- Champions: Serbia (2nd title)
- Runners-up: Turkey
- Third place: Israel

Official website
- www.fiba.basketball

The 2022 FIBA U16 Women's European Championship Division B was the 17th edition of the Division B of the European basketball championship for women's national under-16 teams. The tournament was played from 18 to 27 August 2022 in Podgorica, Montenegro.

== Participating teams ==
- Austria
- Bosnia and Herzegovina
- Bulgaria
- Great Britain
- Iceland
- Ireland
- Israel
- Luxembourg
- Montenegro
- Netherlands
- North Macedonia
- Norway
- Romania
- Serbia
- Slovakia
- Sweden ▼ (16th place, 2019 FIBA U16 Women's European Championship Division A)
- Switzerland
- Turkey ▼ (15th place, 2019 FIBA U16 Women's European Championship Division A)
- Ukraine

== First round ==
The draw of the first round was held on 15 February 2022 in Freising, Germany.

In the first round, the teams were drawn into four groups. The first two teams from each group advance to the quarterfinals; the third and fourth teams advance to the 9th–16th place playoffs; the other teams will play in the 17th–19th place classification group.

=== Group A ===
Pos	Team	Pld	W	L	PF	PA	PD	Pts	Qualification
1	Serbia	4	4	0	323	152	+171	8	Quarterfinals
2	Bosnia and Herzegovina	4	3	1	195	190	+5	7	Quarterfinals
3	Netherlands	4	2	2	228	202	+26	6	9th–16th place playoffs
4	Ireland	4	1	3	246	240	+6	5	9th–16th place playoffs
5	North Macedonia	4	0	4	135	343	−208	4	17th–19th place classification

Source: FIBA

18 August 2022

Boxscore

Ireland	55–60	Bosnia and Herzegovina

University Sports & Culture Hall, Podgorica

18 August 2022

Boxscore

North Macedonia	24–113	Serbia

Bemax Arena, Podgorica

19 August 2022

Boxscore

Netherlands	60–52	Ireland

Bemax Arena, Podgorica

19 August 2022

Boxscore

Bosnia and Herzegovina	47–29	North Macedonia

Bemax Arena, Podgorica

20 August 2022

Boxscore

Serbia	66–44	Bosnia and Herzegovina

University Sports & Culture Hall, Podgorica

20 August 2022

Boxscore

North Macedonia	42–89	Netherlands

University Sports & Culture Hall, Podgorica

22 August 2022

Boxscore

Netherlands	39–64	Serbia

Bemax Arena, Podgorica

22 August 2022

Boxscore

Ireland	94–40	North Macedonia

University Sports & Culture Hall, Podgorica

23 August 2022

Boxscore

Serbia	80–45	Ireland

University Sports & Culture Hall, Podgorica

23 August 2022

Boxscore

Bosnia and Herzegovina	44–40	Netherlands

University Sports & Culture Hall, Podgorica

=== Group B ===
Pos	Team	Pld	W	L	PF	PA	PD	Pts	Qualification
1	Turkey	3	2	1	217	162	+55	5	Quarterfinals
2	Bulgaria	3	2	1	226	185	+41	5	Quarterfinals
3	Montenegro	3	2	1	183	152	+31	5	9th–16th place playoffs
4	Norway	3	0	3	110	237	−127	3	9th–16th place playoffs

Source: FIBA

18 August 2022

Boxscore

Bulgaria	91–49	Norway

University Sports & Culture Hall, Podgorica

18 August 2022

Boxscore

Montenegro	60–58	Turkey

Bemax Arena, Podgorica

20 August 2022

Boxscore

Norway	24–59	Montenegro

Bemax Arena, Podgorica

20 August 2022

Boxscore

Turkey	72–65	Bulgaria

Bemax Arena, Podgorica

23 August 2022

Boxscore

Norway	37–87	Turkey

University Sports & Culture Hall, Podgorica

23 August 2022

Boxscore

Montenegro	64–70	Bulgaria

Bemax Arena, Podgorica

=== Group C ===
Pos	Team	Pld	W	L	PF	PA	PD	Pts	Qualification
1	Israel	4	4	0	295	230	+65	8	Quarterfinals
2	Sweden	4	3	1	270	207	+63	7	Quarterfinals
3	Iceland	4	2	2	245	258	−13	6	9th–16th place playoffs
4	Ukraine	4	1	3	194	231	−37	5	9th–16th place playoffs
5	Switzerland	4	0	4	194	272	−78	4	17th–19th place classification

Source: FIBA

18 August 2022

Boxscore

Iceland	49–74	Sweden

Bemax Arena, Podgorica

18 August 2022

Boxscore

Israel	67–55	Switzerland

University Sports & Culture Hall, Podgorica

19 August 2022

Boxscore

Switzerland	54–68	Iceland

University Sports & Culture Hall, Podgorica

19 August 2022

Boxscore

Ukraine	43–71	Israel

University Sports & Culture Hall, Podgorica

20 August 2022

Boxscore

Sweden	75–42	Switzerland

Bemax Arena, Podgorica

20 August 2022

Boxscore

Iceland	51–44	Ukraine

University Sports & Culture Hall, Podgorica

22 August 2022

Boxscore

Ukraine	45–66	Sweden

University Sports & Culture Hall, Podgorica

22 August 2022

Boxscore

Israel	86–77	Iceland

Bemax Arena, Podgorica

23 August 2022

Boxscore

Sweden	55–71	Israel

University Sports & Culture Hall, Podgorica

23 August 2022

Boxscore

Switzerland	43–62	Ukraine

Bemax Arena, Podgorica

=== Group D ===
Pos	Team	Pld	W	L	PF	PA	PD	Pts	Qualification
1	Austria	4	4	0	244	218	+26	8	Quarterfinals
2	Slovakia	4	3	1	264	178	+86	7	Quarterfinals
3	Great Britain	4	1	3	235	272	−37	5	9th–16th place playoffs
4	Romania	4	1	3	242	273	−31	5	9th–16th place playoffs
5	Luxembourg	4	1	3	218	262	−44	5	17th–19th place classification

Source: FIBA

18 August 2022

Boxscore

Luxembourg	49–67	Austria

Bemax Arena, Podgorica

18 August 2022

Boxscore

Great Britain	47–83	Slovakia

University Sports & Culture Hall, Podgorica

19 August 2022

Boxscore

Slovakia	63–39	Luxembourg

University Sports & Culture Hall, Podgorica

19 August 2022

Boxscore

Romania	62–65	Great Britain

Bemax Arena, Podgorica

20 August 2022

Boxscore

Austria	46–44	Slovakia

Bemax Arena, Podgorica

20 August 2022

Boxscore

Luxembourg	66–70	Romania

University Sports & Culture Hall, Podgorica

22 August 2022

Boxscore

Romania	64–68	Austria

University Sports & Culture Hall, Podgorica

22 August 2022

Boxscore

Great Britain	62–64	Luxembourg

Bemax Arena, Podgorica

23 August 2022

Boxscore

Slovakia	74–46	Romania

Bemax Arena, Podgorica

23 August 2022

Boxscore

Austria	63–61	Great Britain

Bemax Arena, Podgorica

== 17th–19th place classification ==
Pos	Team	Pld	W	L	PF	PA	PD	Pts
17	Luxembourg	2	2	0	134	119	+15	4
18	North Macedonia	2	1	1	115	116	−1	3
19	Switzerland	2	0	2	125	139	−14	2

Source: FIBA

25 August 2022
12:00

Boxscore

North Macedonia	64–57	Switzerland

University Sports & Culture Hall, Podgorica

26 August 2022
12:00

Boxscore

Switzerland	68–75	Luxembourg

University Sports & Culture Hall, Podgorica

27 August 2022
12:00

Boxscore

Luxembourg	59–51	North Macedonia

Bemax Arena, Podgorica

== 9th–16th place playoffs ==
13th place match
Ukraine	87
Romania	62
15th place match
Norway	46
Ireland	73

13th–16th place semifinals
Norway	44
Ukraine	53
Ireland	54
Romania	55

9th–16th place quarterfinals
A3	Netherlands	54
B4	Norway	53
D3	Great Britain	59
C4	Ukraine	51
B3	Montenegro	85
A4	Ireland	61
C3	Iceland	68
D4	Romania	62

9th–12th place semifinals
Netherlands	72
Great Britain	55
Montenegro	87
Iceland	75

9th place match
Netherlands	57
Montenegro	67
11th place match
Great Britain	69
Iceland	66

=== 9th–16th place quarterfinals ===
25 August 2022
14:15

Boxscore

Netherlands	54–53	Norway

University Sports & Culture Hall, Podgorica

25 August 2022
16:30

Boxscore

Great Britain	59–51	Ukraine

University Sports & Culture Hall, Podgorica

25 August 2022
18:45

Boxscore

Montenegro	85–61	Ireland

University Sports & Culture Hall, Podgorica

25 August 2022
21:00

Boxscore

Iceland	68–62	Romania

University Sports & Culture Hall, Podgorica

=== 13th–16th place semifinals ===
26 August 2022
14:15

Boxscore

Norway	44–53	Ukraine

University Sports & Culture Hall, Podgorica

26 August 2022
16:30

Boxscore

Ireland	54–55	Romania

University Sports & Culture Hall, Podgorica

=== 9th–12th place semifinals ===
26 August 2022
18:45

Boxscore

Netherlands	72–55	Great Britain

University Sports & Culture Hall, Podgorica

26 August 2022
21:00

Boxscore

Montenegro	87–75	Iceland

University Sports & Culture Hall, Podgorica

=== 15th place match ===
27 August 2022
16:30

Boxscore

Norway	46–73	Ireland

Bemax Arena, Podgorica

=== 13th place match ===
27 August 2022
11:30

Boxscore

Ukraine	87–62	Romania

University Sports & Culture Hall, Podgorica

=== 11th place match ===
27 August 2022
13:45

Boxscore

Great Britain	69–66	Iceland

University Sports & Culture Hall, Podgorica

=== 9th place match ===
27 August 2022
16:00

Boxscore

Netherlands	57–67	Montenegro

University Sports & Culture Hall, Podgorica

== Championship playoffs ==
5th place match
Bulgaria	66
Slovakia	63
7th place match
Austria	61
Bosnia and Herzegovina	66

5th–8th place semifinals
Bulgaria	64
Austria	61
Bosnia and Herzegovina	57
Slovakia	67

Quarterfinals
A1	Serbia	64
B2	Bulgaria	63
D1	Austria	58
C2	Sweden	63
B1	Turkey	85
A2	Bosnia and Herzegovina	52
C1	Israel	60
D2	Slovakia	48

Semifinals
Serbia	64
Sweden	44
Turkey	71
Israel	51

Final
Serbia	84
Turkey	66
3rd place match
Sweden	47
Israel	59

=== Quarterfinals ===
25 August 2022
14:15

Boxscore

Serbia	64–63	Bulgaria

Bemax Arena, Podgorica

25 August 2022
16:30

Boxscore

Austria	58–63	Sweden

Bemax Arena, Podgorica

25 August 2022
18:45

Boxscore

Turkey	85–52	Bosnia and Herzegovina

Bemax Arena, Podgorica

25 August 2022
21:00

Boxscore

Israel	60–48	Slovakia

Bemax Arena, Podgorica

=== 5th–8th place semifinals ===
26 August 2022
14:15

Boxscore

Bulgaria	64–61	Austria

Bemax Arena, Podgorica

26 August 2022
16:30

Boxscore

Bosnia and Herzegovina	57–67	Slovakia

Bemax Arena, Podgorica

=== Semifinals ===
26 August 2022
18:45

Boxscore

Serbia	64–44	Sweden

Bemax Arena, Podgorica

26 August 2022
21:00

Boxscore

Turkey	71–51	Israel

Bemax Arena, Podgorica

=== 7th place match ===
27 August 2022
18:15

Boxscore

Austria	61–66	Bosnia and Herzegovina

University Sports & Culture Hall, Podgorica

=== 5th place match ===
27 August 2022
14:15

Boxscore

Bulgaria	66–63	Slovakia

Bemax Arena, Podgorica

=== 3rd place match ===
27 August 2022
18:45

Boxscore

Sweden	47–59	Israel

Bemax Arena, Podgorica

=== Final ===
27 August 2022
21:00

Boxscore

Serbia	84–66	Turkey

Bemax Arena, Podgorica

== Final standings ==
Rank	Team
1st place, gold medalist(s)	Serbia
2nd place, silver medalist(s)	Turkey
3rd place, bronze medalist(s)	Israel
4	Sweden
5	Bulgaria
6	Slovakia
7	Bosnia and Herzegovina
8	Austria
9	Montenegro
10	Netherlands
11	Great Britain
12	Iceland
13	Ukraine
14	Romania
15	Ireland
16	Norway
17	Luxembourg
18	North Macedonia
19	Switzerland

Promoted to the 2023 FIBA U16 Women's European Championship Division A
