= Great Britain women's national under-16 basketball team =

Great Britain
- FIBA zone: FIBA Europe
- National federation: British Basketball

U17 World Cup
- Appearances: None

U16 EuroBasket
- Appearances: 1 (2025)
- Medals: None

U16 EuroBasket Division B
- Appearances: 7
- Medals: Bronze: 1 (2024)

The Great Britain women's national under-16 basketball team is a national basketball team of Great Britain, administered by the British Basketball. It represents the country in international under-16 women's basketball competitions.

== FIBA U16 Women's EuroBasket participations ==
Year	Division A	Division B
2017		18th
2018		15th
2019		6th
2022		11th
2023		6th
2024		3rd place, bronze medalist(s)
2025	14th	
2026		Rank 5 trio

== See also ==
- Great Britain women's national basketball team
- Great Britain women's national under-18 basketball team
- Great Britain men's national under-16 basketball team
