= 2015 FIBA Europe Under-16 Championship for Women Division B =

Tournament details
- Host country: Republic of Macedonia
- City: Ohrid, Struga
- Dates: 13–23 August 2015
- Teams: 20 (from 1 confederation)
- Venue(s): 2 (in 2 host cities)

Final positions
- Champions: Lithuania (2nd title)
- Runners-up: Belarus
- Third place: Sweden

Official website
- FIBA Archive

The 2015 FIBA U16 Women's European Championship Division B was the 12th edition of the Division B of the European basketball championship for women's national under-16 teams. It was played in Ohrid and Struga, Republic of Macedonia, from 13 to 23 August 2015. Lithuania women's national under-16 basketball team won the tournament.

== Participating teams ==
- Albania
- Austria
- Belarus
- Bulgaria
- Denmark ▼ (15th place, 2014 FIBA Europe Under-16 Championship for Women Division A)
- Finland
- Greece ▼ (14th place, 2014 FIBA Europe Under-16 Championship for Women Division A)
- Ireland
- Israel
- Lithuania
- Luxembourg
- Macedonia
- Norway
- Poland
- Romania
- Scotland ▲ (1st place, 2014 FIBA Europe Under-16 Championship for Women Division C)
- Slovenia
- Sweden ▼ (16th place, 2014 FIBA Europe Under-16 Championship for Women Division A)
- Switzerland
- Ukraine

== First round ==
In the first round, the teams were drawn into four groups of five. The first two teams from each group will advance to the Quarterfinal Groups E and F, the third and fourth teams will advance to the 9th–16th place classification (Groups G and H), the last teams will play in the 17th–20th place classification (Group I).

=== Group A ===
Pos	Team	Pld	W	L	PF	PA	PD	Pts	Qualification
1	Sweden	4	4	0	302	157	+145	8	Quarterfinal Group E
2	Romania	4	3	1	270	141	+129	7	Quarterfinal Group E
3	Denmark	4	2	2	291	173	+118	6	9th–16th place classification Group G
4	Switzerland	4	1	3	174	250	−76	5	9th–16th place classification Group G
5	Albania	4	0	4	91	407	−316	4	17th–20th place classification Group I

Source: FIBA Archive

=== Group B ===
Pos	Team	Pld	W	L	PF	PA	PD	Pts	Qualification
1	Slovenia	4	4	0	352	174	+178	8	Quarterfinal Group E
2	Ireland	4	3	1	292	216	+76	7	Quarterfinal Group E
3	Ukraine	4	2	2	219	235	−16	6	9th–16th place classification Group G
4	Bulgaria	4	1	3	205	223	−18	5	9th–16th place classification Group G
5	Scotland	4	0	4	132	352	−220	4	17th–20th place classification Group I

Source: FIBA Archive

=== Group C ===
Pos	Team	Pld	W	L	PF	PA	PD	Pts	Qualification
1	Poland	4	4	0	247	150	+97	8	Quarterfinal Group F
2	Greece	4	3	1	199	161	+38	7	Quarterfinal Group F
3	Luxembourg	4	1	3	169	189	−20	5	9th–16th place classification Group H
4	Austria	4	1	3	154	203	−49	5	9th–16th place classification Group H
5	Norway	4	1	3	122	188	−66	5	17th–20th place classification Group I

Source: FIBA Archive

=== Group D ===
Pos	Team	Pld	W	L	PF	PA	PD	Pts	Qualification
1	Belarus	4	4	0	280	226	+54	8	Quarterfinal Group F
2	Lithuania	4	3	1	310	219	+91	7	Quarterfinal Group F
3	Israel	4	2	2	237	235	+2	6	9th–16th place classification Group H
4	Finland	4	1	3	225	238	−13	5	9th–16th place classification Group H
5	Macedonia	4	0	4	155	289	−134	4	17th–20th place classification Group I

Source: FIBA Archive

== 1st–8th place classification ==
=== Group E ===
Pos	Team	Pld	W	L	PF	PA	PD	Pts	Qualification
1	Sweden	3	3	0	206	145	+61	6	Semifinal
2	Slovenia	3	2	1	196	193	+3	5	Semifinal
3	Romania	3	1	2	158	178	−20	4	5th–8th place playoffs
4	Ireland	3	0	3	175	219	−44	3	5th–8th place playoffs

Source: FIBA Archive

=== Group F ===
Pos	Team	Pld	W	L	PF	PA	PD	Pts	Qualification
1	Belarus	3	3	0	218	178	+40	6	Semifinal
2	Lithuania	3	2	1	203	188	+15	5	Semifinal
3	Poland	3	1	2	177	190	−13	4	5th–8th place playoffs
4	Greece	3	0	3	147	189	−42	3	5th–8th place playoffs

Source: FIBA Archive

== 9th–16th place classification ==
=== Group G ===
Pos	Team	Pld	W	L	PF	PA	PD	Pts	Qualification
1	Denmark	3	2	1	183	140	+43	5	9th–12th place playoffs
2	Ukraine	3	2	1	148	129	+19	5	9th–12th place playoffs
3	Bulgaria	3	2	1	162	155	+7	5	13th–16th place playoffs
4	Switzerland	3	0	3	123	192	−69	3	13th–16th place playoffs

Source: FIBA Archive

=== Group H ===
Pos	Team	Pld	W	L	PF	PA	PD	Pts	Qualification
1	Israel	3	3	0	188	139	+49	6	9th–12th place playoffs
2	Finland	3	2	1	197	131	+66	5	9th–12th place playoffs
3	Luxembourg	3	1	2	148	171	−23	4	13th–16th place playoffs
4	Austria	3	0	3	95	187	−92	3	13th–16th place playoffs

Source: FIBA Archive

== 17th–20th place classification ==
=== Group I ===
Pos	Team	Pld	W	L	PF	PA	PD	Pts
17	Macedonia	3	3	0	163	134	+29	6
18	Norway	3	2	1	156	130	+26	5
19	Scotland	3	1	2	116	139	−23	4
20	Albania	3	0	3	120	152	−32	3

Source: FIBA Archive

== 13th–16th place playoffs ==
13th–16th place semifinals
G3	Bulgaria	56
H4	Austria	44
H3	Luxembourg	47
G4	Switzerland	69

13th place match
G3	Bulgaria	45
G4	Switzerland	42
15th place match
H4	Austria	58
H3	Luxembourg	49

== 9th–12th place playoffs ==
9th–12th place semifinals
G1	Denmark	62
H2	Finland	69
H1	Israel	59
G2	Ukraine	52

9th place match
H2	Finland	62
H1	Israel	67
11th place match
G1	Denmark	65
G2	Ukraine	52

== 5th–8th place playoffs ==
5th–8th place semifinals
E3	Romania	67
F4	Greece	41
F3	Poland	66
E4	Ireland	45

5th place match
E3	Romania	56
F3	Poland	55
7th place match
F4	Greece	47
E4	Ireland	60

== Championship playoffs ==
Semifinals
E1	Sweden	61
F2	Lithuania	81
F1	Belarus	71
E2	Slovenia	57

Finals
F2	Lithuania	80
F1	Belarus	74
3rd place match
E1	Sweden	51
E2	Slovenia	48

== Final standings ==
Promoted to the 2016 FIBA U16 Women's European Championship Division A

Rank	Team
1st place, gold medalist(s)	Lithuania
2nd place, silver medalist(s)	Belarus
3rd place, bronze medalist(s)	Sweden
4	Slovenia
5	Romania
6	Poland
7	Ireland
8	Greece
9	Israel
10	Finland
11	Denmark
12	Ukraine
13	Bulgaria
14	Switzerland
15	Austria
16	Luxembourg
17	Macedonia
18	Norway
19	Scotland
20	Albania
