= North Macedonia women's national under-16 basketball team =

Youth national basketball team of North Macedonia

North Macedonia
- FIBA zone: FIBA Europe
- National federation: Basketball Federation of North Macedonia

U17 World Cup
- Appearances: None

U16 EuroBasket
- Appearances: None

U16 EuroBasket Division B
- Appearances: 8
- Medals: None

The North Macedonia women's national under-16 basketball team is a national basketball team of North Macedonia, administered by the Basketball Federation of North Macedonia. It represents the country in international under-16 women's basketball competitions.

== FIBA U16 Women's EuroBasket participations ==
Year	Result in Division B
2010	14th
2015	17th
2016	15th
2017	17th
2018	22nd
2019	22nd
2022	18th
2025	18th

== See also ==
- North Macedonia women's national basketball team
- North Macedonia women's national under-18 basketball team
- North Macedonia men's national under-16 basketball team
