= 2017 FIBA U16 Women's European Championship Division B =

Tournament details
- Host country: Republic of Macedonia
- City: Skopje
- Dates: 17–26 August 2017
- Teams: 22 (from 1 confederation)
- Venue(s): 2 (in 1 host city)

Final positions
- Champions: Denmark (1st title)
- Runners-up: Belgium
- Third place: Greece

Official website
- www.fiba.basketball

The 2017 FIBA U16 Women's European Championship Division B was the 14th edition of the Division B of the European basketball championship for women's national under-16 teams. It was played in Skopje, Republic of Macedonia, from 17 to 26 August 2017. Denmark women's national under-16 basketball team won the tournament.

== Participating teams ==
- Albania
- Belgium
- Bosnia and Herzegovina
- Bulgaria
- Denmark
- Estonia
- Finland
- Great Britain
- Greece
- Iceland
- Ireland
- Israel
- Luxembourg
- Macedonia
- Moldova
- Norway
- Portugal ▼ (14th place, 2016 FIBA U16 Women's European Championship Division A)
- Slovakia ▼ (16th place, 2016 FIBA U16 Women's European Championship Division A)
- Slovenia
- Sweden ▼ (15th place, 2016 FIBA U16 Women's European Championship Division A)
- Switzerland
- Ukraine

== First round ==
In the first round, the teams were drawn into four groups. The first two teams from each group will advance to the quarterfinals, the third and fourth teams will advance to the 9th–16th place playoffs, the other teams will play in the 17th–22nd place classification.

=== Group A ===
Pos	Team	Pld	W	L	PF	PA	PD	Pts	Qualification
1	Portugal	4	4	0	284	138	+146	8	Quarterfinals
2	Finland	4	3	1	247	143	+104	7	Quarterfinals
3	Estonia	4	1	3	165	218	−53	5	9th–16th place playoffs
4	Bulgaria	4	1	3	197	284	−87	5	9th–16th place playoffs
5	Norway	4	1	3	139	249	−110	5	17th–22nd place classification

Source: FIBA

=== Group B ===
Pos	Team	Pld	W	L	PF	PA	PD	Pts	Qualification
1	Belgium	5	5	0	478	222	+256	10	Quarterfinals
2	Ukraine	5	4	1	337	261	+76	9	Quarterfinals
3	Slovenia	5	3	2	347	272	+75	8	9th–16th place playoffs
4	Ireland	5	2	3	293	289	+4	7	9th–16th place playoffs
5	Macedonia	5	1	4	300	327	−27	6	17th–22nd place classification
6	Moldova	5	0	5	93	477	−384	5	17th–22nd place classification

Source: FIBA

=== Group C ===
Pos	Team	Pld	W	L	PF	PA	PD	Pts	Qualification
1	Greece	4	4	0	286	141	+145	8	Quarterfinals
2	Sweden	4	3	1	213	235	−22	7	Quarterfinals
3	Israel	4	2	2	258	202	+56	6	9th–16th place playoffs
4	Luxembourg	4	1	3	149	259	−110	5	9th–16th place playoffs
5	Iceland	4	0	4	166	235	−69	4	17th–22nd place classification

Source: FIBA

=== Group D ===
Pos	Team	Pld	W	L	PF	PA	PD	Pts	Qualification
1	Denmark	5	5	0	370	260	+110	10	Quarterfinals
2	Bosnia and Herzegovina	5	4	1	375	284	+91	9	Quarterfinals
3	Switzerland	5	3	2	379	252	+127	8	9th–16th place playoffs
4	Slovakia	5	2	3	260	332	−72	7	9th–16th place playoffs
5	Great Britain	5	1	4	239	284	−45	6	17th–22nd place classification
6	Albania	5	0	5	212	423	−211	5	17th–22nd place classification

Source: FIBA

== 17th–22nd place classification ==
=== Group E ===
Pos	Team	Pld	W	L	PF	PA	PD	Pts	Qualification
1	Macedonia	2	2	0	149	85	+64	4	17th place match
2	Norway	2	1	1	115	76	+39	3	19th place match
3	Moldova	2	0	2	44	147	−103	2	21st place match

Source: FIBA Archive

=== Group F ===
Pos	Team	Pld	W	L	PF	PA	PD	Pts	Qualification
1	Great Britain	2	2	0	111	77	+34	4	17th place match
2	Iceland	2	1	1	120	98	+22	3	19th place match
3	Albania	2	0	2	90	146	−56	2	21st place match

Source: FIBA Archive

=== 21st place match ===
26 August 2017

Boxscore

Moldova	36–69	Albania

=== 19th place match ===
26 August 2017

Boxscore

Norway	41–50	Iceland

=== 17th place match ===
26 August 2017

Boxscore

Macedonia	53–50	Great Britain

== 9th–16th place playoffs ==
13th place match
C4	Luxembourg	47
A4	Bulgaria	51
15th place match
A3	Estonia	50
D4	Slovakia	38

13th–16th place semifinals
A3	Estonia	45
C4	Luxembourg	47
A4	Bulgaria	58
D4	Slovakia	49

9th–16th place quarterfinals
A3	Estonia	45
B4	Ireland	70
D3	Switzerland	58
C4	Luxembourg	35
B3	Slovenia	82
A4	Bulgaria	47
C3	Israel	58
D4	Slovakia	43

9th–12th place semifinals
B4	Ireland	57
D3	Switzerland	53
B3	Slovenia	68
C3	Israel	82

9th place match
B4	Ireland	54
C3	Israel	66
11th place match
D3	Switzerland	47
B3	Slovenia	53

== Championship playoffs ==
5th place match
A1	Portugal	46
A2	Finland	63
7th place match
C2	Sweden	58
D2	Bosnia and Herzegovina	54

5th–8th place semifinals
A1	Portugal	55
C2	Sweden	52
A2	Finland	71
D2	Bosnia and Herzegovina	59

Quarterfinals
A1	Portugal	64
B2	Ukraine	67
D1	Denmark	60
C2	Sweden	43
B1	Belgium	65
A2	Finland	64
C1	Greece	52
D2	Bosnia and Herzegovina	44

Semifinals
B2	Ukraine	38
D1	Denmark	54
B1	Belgium	70
C1	Greece	63

Final
D1	Denmark	74
B1	Belgium	73
3rd place match
B2	Ukraine	36
C1	Greece	53

== Final standings ==
Rank	Team
1st place, gold medalist(s)	Denmark
2nd place, silver medalist(s)	Belgium
3rd place, bronze medalist(s)	Greece
4	Ukraine
5	Finland
6	Portugal
7	Sweden
8	Bosnia and Herzegovina
9	Israel
10	Ireland
11	Slovenia
12	Switzerland
13	Bulgaria
14	Luxembourg
15	Estonia
16	Slovakia
17	Macedonia
18	Great Britain
19	Iceland
20	Norway
21	Albania
22	Moldova

Promoted to the 2018 FIBA U16 Women's European Championship Division A
