= Armenia women's national under-16 basketball team =

Armenian under-16 basketball team

Armenia
- FIBA zone: FIBA Europe
- National federation: Basketball Federation of Armenia

U17 World Cup
- Appearances: None

U16 EuroBasket
- Appearances: None

U16 EuroBasket Division B
- Appearances: None

U16 EuroBasket Division C
- Appearances: 7
- Medals: Gold: 1 (2017); Silver: 3 (2015, 2022, 2025)

The Armenia women's national under-16 basketball team is a national basketball team of Armenia, administered by the Basketball Federation of Armenia. It represents the country in international under-16 women's basketball competitions.

== FIBA U16 Women's EuroBasket participations ==
Year	Result in Division C
2015	2nd place, silver medalist(s)
2017	1st place, gold medalist(s)
2022	2nd place, silver medalist(s)
2023	6th
2024	5th
2025	2nd place, silver medalist(s)
2026	4th

== See also ==
- Armenia women's national basketball team
- Armenia women's national under-18 basketball team
- Armenia men's national under-16 basketball team
