= 2026 FIBA U16 Women's EuroBasket Division C =

International youth basketball tournament

Tournament details
- Host country: Malta
- City: Valletta
- Dates: 7–12 July 2026
- Teams: 7 (from 1 confederation)
- Venue: 1 (in 1 host city)

Final positions
- Champions: Malta (1st title)
- Runners-up: Albania
- Third place: Georgia

Official website
- www.fiba.basketball

The 2026 FIBA U16 Women's EuroBasket Division C was the 20th edition of the Division C of the FIBA U16 Women's EuroBasket, the third tier of the European under-16 women's basketball championship. The tournament was played at Ta' Qali Sports Pavillion in Valletta, Malta, from 7 to 12 July 2026.

Malta secured their first ever title with a victory over Albania in the final, 76–51.

== Participating teams ==
- Albania
- Armenia
- Georgia
- Gibraltar
- Kosovo
- Malta
- Moldova

== First round ==
The draw of the first round was held on 5 February 2026 in Freising, Germany.

In the first round, the teams were drawn into two groups. The first two teams from each group advanced to the semifinals; the other teams were dropped to the 5th–7th place classification group.

All times are local (Central European Summer Time; UTC+2).

=== Group A ===
Pos	Team	Pld	W	L	PF	PA	PD	Pts	Qualification
1	Malta (H)	2	2	0	135	124	+11	4	Semifinals
2	Georgia	2	1	1	136	100	+36	3	Semifinals
3	Kosovo	2	0	2	104	151	−47	2	5th–7th place classification

Source: FIBA
(H) Hosts

7 July 2026
18:30

Boxscore

Malta	61–59	Georgia
Scoring by quarter: 12–19, 20–12, 11–14, 18–14

Ta' Qali Sports Pavillion

8 July 2026
13:30

Boxscore

Georgia	77–39	Kosovo
Scoring by quarter: 17–11, 21–7, 23–14, 16–7

Ta' Qali Sports Pavillion

9 July 2026
18:30

Boxscore

Kosovo	65–74	Malta
Scoring by quarter: 20–20, 13–20, 18–17, 14–17

Ta' Qali Sports Pavillion

=== Group B ===
Pos	Team	Pld	W	L	PF	PA	PD	Pts	Qualification
1	Albania	3	3	0	271	153	+118	6	Semifinals
2	Armenia	3	2	1	256	156	+100	5	Semifinals
3	Moldova	3	1	2	123	224	−101	4	5th–7th place classification
4	Gibraltar	3	0	3	114	231	−117	3	5th–7th place classification

Source: FIBA

7 July 2026
13:30

Boxscore

Albania	96–38	Gibraltar
Scoring by quarter: 21–13, 18–7, 27–13, 30–5

Ta' Qali Sports Pavillion

7 July 2026
16:00

Boxscore

Moldova	29–100	Armenia
Scoring by quarter: 10–20, 9–37, 2–20, 8–23

Ta' Qali Sports Pavillion

8 July 2026
16:00

Boxscore

Armenia	75–89	Albania
Scoring by quarter: 18–19, 18–30, 24–20, 15–20

Ta' Qali Sports Pavillion

8 July 2026
18:30

Boxscore

Gibraltar	38–54	Moldova
Scoring by quarter: 16–14, 5–19, 9–12, 8–9

Ta' Qali Sports Pavillion

9 July 2026
13:30

Boxscore

Armenia	81–38	Gibraltar
Scoring by quarter: 10–8, 27–17, 25–3, 19–10

Ta' Qali Sports Pavillion

9 July 2026
16:00

Boxscore

Albania	86–40	Moldova
Scoring by quarter: 19–9, 20–3, 26–13, 21–15

Ta' Qali Sports Pavillion

== 5th–7th place classification ==
Pos	Team	Pld	W	L	PF	PA	PD	Pts
5	Kosovo	2	2	0	172	66	+106	4
6	Moldova	2	1	1	89	112	−23	3
7	Gibraltar	2	0	2	69	152	−83	2

Source: FIBA

Note: The following match was carried over from the first round: GIB v. MDA 38–54.

11 July 2026
13:30

Boxscore

Gibraltar	31–98	Kosovo
Scoring by quarter: 5–18, 3–22, 14–24, 9–34

Ta' Qali Sports Pavillion

12 July 2026
13:30

Boxscore

Kosovo	74–35	Moldova
Scoring by quarter: 21–5, 14–10, 15–4, 24–16

Ta' Qali Sports Pavillion

== Championship playoffs ==
Semifinals
A1	Malta	67
B2	Armenia	55
B1	Albania	58
A2	Georgia	57

Final
Malta	76
Albania	51
3rd place match
Armenia	49
Georgia	73

=== Semifinals ===
11 July 2026
16:00

Boxscore

Albania	58–57	Georgia
Scoring by quarter: 18–16, 15–12, 17–16, 8–13

Ta' Qali Sports Pavillion

11 July 2026
18:30

Boxscore

Malta	67–55	Armenia
Scoring by quarter: 14–6, 11–14, 21–22, 21–13

Ta' Qali Sports Pavillion

=== 3rd place match ===
12 July 2026
16:00

Boxscore

Armenia	49–73	Georgia
Scoring by quarter: 11–20, 13–19, 8–17, 17–17

Ta' Qali Sports Pavillion

=== Final ===
12 July 2026
18:30

Boxscore

Malta	76–51	Albania
Scoring by quarter: 14–14, 22–19, 12–8, 28–10

Ta' Qali Sports Pavillion

== Final standings ==
Rank	Team
1st place, gold medalist(s)	Malta
2nd place, silver medalist(s)	Albania
3rd place, bronze medalist(s)	Georgia
4	Armenia
5	Kosovo
6	Moldova
7	Gibraltar
