= 2018 FIBA U16 Women's European Championship Division B =

Tournament details
- Host country: Montenegro
- City: Podgorica
- Dates: 16–25 August 2018
- Teams: 23 (from 1 confederation)
- Venues: 3 (in 1 host city)

Final positions
- Champions: Sweden (2nd title)
- Runners-up: Greece
- Third place: Finland

Official website
- www.fiba.basketball

The 2018 FIBA U16 Women's European Championship Division B was the 15th edition of the Division B of the European basketball championship for women's national under-16 teams. It was played in Podgorica, Montenegro, from 16 to 25 August 2018. Sweden won the tournament.

== Participating teams ==
- Albania
- Belarus ▼ (15th place, 2017 FIBA U16 Women's European Championship Division A)
- Bosnia and Herzegovina
- Bulgaria
- Estonia
- Finland
- Great Britain
- Greece
- Iceland
- Ireland
- Israel
- Kosovo ▲ (5th place, 2017 FIBA U16 Women's European Championship Division C)
- Luxembourg
- Macedonia
- Montenegro
- Norway
- Portugal
- Romania ▼ (16th place, 2017 FIBA U16 Women's European Championship Division A)
- Slovakia
- Slovenia
- Sweden
- Switzerland
- Ukraine

== First round ==
In the first round, the teams were drawn into four groups. The first two teams from each group will advance to the quarterfinals, the third and fourth teams will advance to the 9th–16th place playoffs, the other teams will play in the 17th–23rd place classification.

=== Group A ===
Pos	Team	Pld	W	L	PF	PA	PD	Pts	Qualification
1	Greece	5	5	0	353	191	+162	10	Quarterfinals
2	Sweden	5	4	1	337	241	+96	9	Quarterfinals
3	Montenegro	5	3	2	262	289	−27	8	9th–16th place playoffs
4	Great Britain	5	2	3	214	248	−34	7	9th–16th place playoffs
5	Iceland	5	1	4	240	336	−96	6	17th–23rd place classification
6	Macedonia	5	0	5	229	330	−101	5	17th–23rd place classification

Source: FIBA

=== Group B ===
Pos	Team	Pld	W	L	PF	PA	PD	Pts	Qualification
1	Portugal	4	4	0	255	190	+65	8	Quarterfinals
2	Slovenia	4	3	1	251	178	+73	7	Quarterfinals
3	Estonia	4	2	2	205	239	−34	6	9th–16th place playoffs
4	Slovakia	4	1	3	201	233	−32	5	9th–16th place playoffs
5	Bulgaria	4	0	4	199	271	−72	4	17th–23rd place classification

Source: FIBA

=== Group C ===
Pos	Team	Pld	W	L	PF	PA	PD	Pts	Qualification
1	Israel	5	5	0	384	196	+188	10	Quarterfinals
2	Romania	5	4	1	287	260	+27	9	Quarterfinals
3	Ireland	5	3	2	291	272	+19	8	9th–16th place playoffs
4	Switzerland	5	2	3	261	292	−31	7	9th–16th place playoffs
5	Luxembourg	5	1	4	282	325	−43	6	17th–23rd place classification
6	Kosovo	5	0	5	218	378	−160	5	17th–23rd place classification

Source: FIBA

=== Group D ===
Pos	Team	Pld	W	L	PF	PA	PD	Pts	Qualification
1	Finland	5	5	0	448	268	+180	10	Quarterfinals
2	Belarus	5	4	1	402	244	+158	9	Quarterfinals
3	Ukraine	5	3	2	268	265	+3	8	9th–16th place playoffs
4	Norway	5	2	3	297	299	−2	7	9th–16th place playoffs
5	Bosnia and Herzegovina	5	1	4	272	310	−38	6	17th–23rd place classification
6	Albania	5	0	5	168	469	−301	5	17th–23rd place classification

Source: FIBA

== 17th–23rd place classification ==
=== Group E ===
Pos	Team	Pld	W	L	PF	PA	PD	Pts	Qualification
1	Bulgaria	2	2	0	148	98	+50	4	17th place match
2	Iceland	2	1	1	104	130	−26	3	19th place match
3	Macedonia	2	0	2	113	137	−24	2	21st place match

Source: FIBA

=== Playoffs ===
21st place match
E3	Macedonia	49
C6	Kosovo	64
23rd place
D6	Albania

21st–23rd place semifinals
Group E
D6	Albania	54
C6	Kosovo	62

17th–23rd place quarterfinals
Group E
Group E
C5	Luxembourg	72
D6	Albania	44
D5	Bosnia and Herzegovina	83
C6	Kosovo	57

17th–20th place semifinals
Group E
C5	Luxembourg	62
D5	Bosnia and Herzegovina	55

17th place match
E1	Bulgaria	50
C5	Luxembourg	57
19th place match
E2	Iceland	65
D5	Bosnia and Herzegovina	54

== 9th–16th place playoffs ==
13th place match
B4	Slovakia	49
C3	Ireland	47
15th place match
C4	Switzerland	49
A4	Great Britain	52

13th–16th place semifinals
B4	Slovakia	62
C4	Switzerland	48
A4	Great Britain	58
C3	Ireland	66

9th–16th place quarterfinals
A3	Montenegro	58
B4	Slovakia	51
D3	Ukraine	73
C4	Switzerland	35
B3	Estonia	42
A4	Great Britain	28
C3	Ireland	50
D4	Norway	64

9th–12th place semifinals
A3	Montenegro	42
D3	Ukraine	52
B3	Estonia	60
D4	Norway	56

9th place match
D3	Ukraine	50
B3	Estonia	54
11th place match
A3	Montenegro	64
D4	Norway	43

== Championship playoffs ==
5th place match
C2	Romania	47
C1	Israel	59
7th place match
B2	Slovenia	68
B1	Portugal	77

5th–8th place semifinals
B2	Slovenia	61
C2	Romania	65
B1	Portugal	52
C1	Israel	59

Quarterfinals
A1	Greece	77
B2	Slovenia	43
D1	Finland	77
C2	Romania	54
B1	Portugal	44
A2	Sweden	57
C1	Israel	80
D2	Belarus	82

Semifinals
A1	Greece	80
D1	Finland	44
A2	Sweden	62
D2	Belarus	54

Final
A1	Greece	41
A2	Sweden	51
3rd place match
D1	Finland	86
D2	Belarus	52

== Final standings ==
Rank	Team
1st place, gold medalist(s)	Sweden
2nd place, silver medalist(s)	Greece
3rd place, bronze medalist(s)	Finland
4	Belarus
5	Israel
6	Romania
7	Portugal
8	Slovenia
9	Estonia
10	Ukraine
11	Montenegro
12	Norway
13	Slovakia
14	Ireland
15	Great Britain
16	Switzerland
17	Luxembourg
18	Bulgaria
19	Iceland
20	Bosnia and Herzegovina
21	Kosovo
22	Macedonia
23	Albania

Promoted to the 2019 FIBA U16 Women's European Championship Division A
