= Switzerland women's national under-16 basketball team =

Switzerland
- FIBA zone: FIBA Europe
- National federation: Swiss Basketball

U17 World Cup
- Appearances: None

U16 EuroBasket
- Appearances: 1
- Medals: None

U16 EuroBasket Division B
- Appearances: 15
- Medals: None

The Switzerland women's national under-16 basketball team is a national basketball team of Switzerland, administered by the Swiss Basketball. It represents the country in international under-16 women's basketball competitions.

== FIBA U16 Women's EuroBasket participations ==
Year	Division A	Division B
1976	16th	
2008		14th
2009		18th
2010		15th
2011		12th
2013		13th
2014		10th
2015		14th

Year	Division A	Division B
2017		12th
2018		16th
2019		18th
2022		19th
2023		18th
2024		19th
2025		4th
2026		Rank 4 trio

== See also ==
- Switzerland women's national basketball team
- Switzerland women's national under-18 basketball team
- Switzerland men's national under-16 basketball team
