= 2019 FIBA U16 Women's European Championship Division B =

Tournament details
- Host country: Bulgaria
- City: Sofia
- Dates: 15–24 August 2019
- Teams: 23 (from 1 confederation)
- Venues: 3 (in 1 host city)

Final positions
- Champions: Slovenia (1st title)
- Runners-up: Portugal
- Third place: Croatia

Official website
- www.fiba.basketball

The 2019 FIBA U16 Women's European Championship Division B was the 16th edition of the Division B of the European basketball championship for women's national under-16 teams. It was played in Sofia, Bulgaria, from 15 to 24 August 2019. Slovenia women's national under-16 basketball team won the tournament.

== Participating teams ==
- Albania
- Austria ▲ (1st place, 2018 FIBA U16 Women's European Championship Division C)
- Belarus
- Bosnia and Herzegovina
- Bulgaria
- Croatia ▼ (14th place, 2018 FIBA U16 Women's European Championship Division A)
- Great Britain
- Iceland
- Ireland
- Israel
- Kosovo
- Luxembourg
- Montenegro
- Netherlands ▼ (16th place, 2018 FIBA U16 Women's European Championship Division A)
- North Macedonia
- Norway
- Portugal
- Romania
- Serbia ▼ (15th place, 2018 FIBA U16 Women's European Championship Division A)
- Slovakia
- Slovenia
- Switzerland
- Ukraine

== First round ==
In the first round, the teams were drawn into four groups. The first two teams from each group will advance to the quarterfinals, the third and fourth teams will advance to the 9th–16th place playoffs, the other teams will play in the 17th–23rd place classification.

=== Group A ===
Pos	Team	Pld	W	L	PF	PA	PD	Pts	Qualification
1	Slovenia	5	5	0	369	217	+152	10	Quarterfinals
2	Serbia	5	4	1	328	273	+55	9	Quarterfinals
3	Romania	5	2	3	230	256	−26	7	9th–16th place playoffs
4	Montenegro	5	2	3	253	296	−43	7	9th–16th place playoffs
5	Bosnia and Herzegovina	5	1	4	256	315	−59	6	17th–23rd place classification
6	Iceland	5	1	4	245	324	−79	6	17th–23rd place classification

Source: FIBA

=== Group B ===
Pos	Team	Pld	W	L	PF	PA	PD	Pts	Qualification
1	Portugal	5	5	0	367	200	+167	10	Quarterfinals
2	Great Britain	5	3	2	310	252	+58	8	Quarterfinals
3	Ireland	5	3	2	355	276	+79	8	9th–16th place playoffs
4	Belarus	5	3	2	320	264	+56	8	9th–16th place playoffs
5	Austria	5	1	4	268	314	−46	6	17th–23rd place classification
6	Albania	5	0	5	181	495	−314	5	17th–23rd place classification

Source: FIBA

=== Group C ===
Pos	Team	Pld	W	L	PF	PA	PD	Pts	Qualification
1	Croatia	5	4	1	348	214	+134	9	Quarterfinals
2	Norway	5	4	1	293	266	+27	9	Quarterfinals
3	Slovakia	5	3	2	295	256	+39	8	9th–16th place playoffs
4	Israel	5	3	2	311	279	+32	8	9th–16th place playoffs
5	Switzerland	5	1	4	235	329	−94	6	17th–23rd place classification
6	Kosovo	5	0	5	226	364	−138	5	17th–23rd place classification

Source: FIBA

=== Group D ===
Pos	Team	Pld	W	L	PF	PA	PD	Pts	Qualification
1	Ukraine	4	3	1	300	206	+94	7	Quarterfinals
2	Bulgaria	4	3	1	306	243	+63	7	Quarterfinals
3	Netherlands	4	3	1	301	225	+76	7	9th–16th place playoffs
4	Luxembourg	4	1	3	266	282	−16	5	9th–16th place playoffs
5	North Macedonia	4	0	4	151	368	−217	4	17th–23rd place classification

Source: FIBA

== 17th–23rd place classification ==
=== Group E ===
Pos	Team	Pld	W	L	PF	PA	PD	Pts	Qualification
1	Switzerland	2	2	0	119	109	+10	4	17th place match
2	Kosovo	2	1	1	122	87	+35	3	19th place match
3	North Macedonia	2	0	2	76	121	−45	2	21st place match

Source: FIBA

=== Playoffs ===
21st place match
E3	North Macedonia	43
A6	Iceland	84
23rd place
B6	Albania

21st–23rd place semifinals
Group E
B6	Albania	43
A6	Iceland	79

17th–23rd place quarterfinals
Group E
Group E
A5	Bosnia and Herzegovina	90
B6	Albania	39
B5	Austria	68
A6	Iceland	56

17th–20th place semifinals
Group E
A5	Bosnia and Herzegovina	63
B5	Austria	53

17th place match
E1	Switzerland	60
A5	Bosnia and Herzegovina	66
19th place match
E2	Kosovo	34
B5	Austria	45

== 9th–16th place playoffs ==
13th place match
Netherlands	76
Montenegro	70
15th place match
Romania	69
Luxembourg	45

13th–16th place semifinals
Romania	61
Netherlands	86
Montenegro	71
Luxembourg	56

9th–16th place quarterfinals
A3	Romania	52
B4	Belarus	53
D3	Netherlands	54
C4	Israel	71
B3	Ireland	60
A4	Montenegro	48
C3	Slovakia	63
D4	Luxembourg	60

9th–12th place semifinals
Belarus	62
Israel	49
Ireland	47
Slovakia	60

9th place match
Belarus	46
Slovakia	43
11th place match
Israel	66
Ireland	46

== Championship playoffs ==
5th place match
Great Britain	63
Serbia	75
7th place match
Ukraine	68
Bulgaria	62

5th–8th place semifinals
Great Britain	69
Ukraine	46
Serbia	56
Bulgaria	49

Quarterfinals
A1	Slovenia	57
B2	Great Britain	40
D1	Ukraine	50
C2	Norway	68
B1	Portugal	59
A2	Serbia	49
C1	Croatia	61
D2	Bulgaria	59

Semifinals
Slovenia	67
Norway	60
Portugal	49
Croatia	45

Final
Slovenia	71
Portugal	56
3rd place match
Norway	45
Croatia	49

== Final standings ==
Rank	Team
1st place, gold medalist(s)	Slovenia
2nd place, silver medalist(s)	Portugal
3rd place, bronze medalist(s)	Croatia
4	Norway
5	Serbia
6	Great Britain
7	Ukraine
8	Bulgaria
9	Belarus
10	Slovakia
11	Israel
12	Ireland
13	Netherlands
14	Montenegro
15	Romania
16	Luxembourg
17	Bosnia and Herzegovina
18	Switzerland
19	Austria
20	Kosovo
21	Iceland
22	North Macedonia
23	Albania

Promoted to the 2022 FIBA U16 Women's European Championship Division A
Signed up for the 2022 FIBA U16 Women's European Championship Division C
