= Norway women's national under-16 basketball team =

Youth basketball team representing Norway

Norway
- FIBA zone: FIBA Europe
- National federation: Norwegian Basketball Federation

U17 World Cup
- Appearances: None

U16 EuroBasket
- Appearances: None

U16 EuroBasket Division B
- Appearances: 13
- Medals: None

The Norway women's national under-16 basketball team is a national basketball team of Norway, administered by the Norwegian Basketball Federation. It represents the country in international under-16 women's basketball competitions.

== FIBA U16 Women's EuroBasket participations ==
Year	Result in Division B
2012	15th
2013	17th
2014	14th
2015	18th
2016	19th
2017	20th
2018	12th

Year	Result in Division B
2019	4th
2022	16th
2023	19th
2024	12th
2025	16th
2026	Rank 4 trio

== See also ==
- Norway women's national basketball team
- Norway women's national under-18 basketball team
- Norway men's national under-16 basketball team
