= Azerbaijan women's national under-16 basketball team =

Youth national basketball team

Azerbaijan
- FIBA zone: FIBA Europe
- National federation: Azerbaijan Basketball Federation

U17 World Cup
- Appearances: None

U16 EuroBasket
- Appearances: None

U16 EuroBasket Division B
- Appearances: 2
- Medals: None

U16 EuroBasket Division C
- Appearances: 2
- Medals: Gold: 2 (2023, 2024)

The Azerbaijan women's national under-16 basketball team is a national basketball team of Azerbaijan, administered by the Azerbaijan Basketball Federation. It represents the country in international under-16 women's basketball competitions.

== FIBA U16 Women's EuroBasket record ==
Year	Division B	Division C	Pld	W	L
2023	-	1st place, gold medalist(s)	5	5	0
2024	-	1st place, gold medalist(s)	5	5	0
2025	19th	-	6	1	5
2026	Rank 5 trio	-	4	2	2
Total	2/21	2/20	20	13	7

== See also ==
- Azerbaijan women's national basketball team
- Azerbaijan women's national under-18 basketball team
- Azerbaijan men's national under-16 basketball team
