= Moldova women's national under-16 basketball team =

Basketball team

Moldova
- FIBA zone: FIBA Europe
- National federation: Basketball Federation of Moldova

U17 World Cup
- Appearances: None

U16 EuroBasket
- Appearances: None

U16 EuroBasket Division B
- Appearances: 1
- Medals: None

U16 EuroBasket Division C
- Appearances: 7
- Medals: None

The Moldova women's national under-16 basketball team is a national basketball team of Moldova, administered by the Basketball Federation of Moldova. It represents the country in international under-16 women's basketball competitions.

== FIBA U16 Women's EuroBasket participations ==
Year	Division B	Division C
2017	22nd	
2018		4th
2019		4th
2022		6th
2023		7th
2024		7th
2025		7th
2026		6th

== See also ==
- Moldova women's national basketball team
- Moldova women's national under-18 basketball team
- Moldova men's national under-16 basketball team
