= Slovakia women's national under-16 basketball team =

Slovakia
- FIBA zone: FIBA Europe
- National federation: Slovak Basketball Association

U17 World Cup
- Appearances: 1
- Medals: None

U16 EuroBasket
- Appearances: 13
- Medals: None

U16 EuroBasket Division B
- Appearances: 12
- Medals: Gold: 1 (2005); Silver: 1 (2010); Bronze: 1 (2009)

The Slovakia women's national under-16 basketball team is a national basketball team of Slovakia, administered by the Slovak Basketball Association. It represents the country in international under-16 women's basketball competitions.

== FIBA U16 Women's EuroBasket participations ==
Year	Division A	Division B
1993	4th	
1995	10th	
1999	5th	
2001	6th	
2004	15th	
2005		1st place, gold medalist(s)
2006	10th	
2007	16th	
2008		5th
2009		3rd place, bronze medalist(s)
2010		2nd place, silver medalist(s)
2011	11th	
2012	8th	

Year	Division A	Division B
2013	10th	
2014	12th	
2015	13th	
2016	16th	
2017		16th
2018		13th
2019		10th
2022		6th
2023		9th
2024		8th
2025		5th
2026		Rank 3 trio

== FIBA Under-17 Women's Basketball World Cup participations ==
Year	Result
2014	15th

== See also ==
- Slovakia women's national basketball team
- Slovakia women's national under-19 basketball team
- Slovakia men's national under-16 basketball team
