= Kosovo women's national under-16 basketball team =

Kosovo
- FIBA zone: FIBA Europe
- National federation: Kosovo Basketball Federation

U17 World Cup
- Appearances: None

U16 EuroBasket
- Appearances: None

U16 EuroBasket Division B
- Appearances: 3
- Medals: None

U16 EuroBasket Division C
- Appearances: 4
- Medals: None

The Kosovo women's national under-16 basketball team is a national basketball team of Kosovo, administered by the Kosovo Basketball Federation. It represents the country in international under-16 women's basketball competitions.

== FIBA U16 Women's EuroBasket participations ==
Year	Division B	Division C
2016		4th
2017		5th
2018	21st	
2019	20th	
2024	20th	
2025		6th
2026		5th

== See also ==
- Kosovo women's national basketball team
- Kosovo women's national under-18 basketball team
- Kosovo men's national under-16 basketball team
