= Montenegro women's national under-16 basketball team =

Montenegro
- FIBA zone: FIBA Europe
- National federation: Basketball Federation of Montenegro

U17 World Cup
- Appearances: None

U16 EuroBasket
- Appearances: 1
- Medals: None

U16 EuroBasket Division B
- Appearances: 7
- Medals: Silver: 1 (2023)

The Montenegro women's national under-16 basketball team is a national basketball team of Montenegro, administered by the Basketball Federation of Montenegro. It represents the country in international under-16 women's basketball competitions.

The team was established in 2007 after the dissolution of the national team of Serbia and Montenegro.

== FIBA U16 Women's EuroBasket participations ==
Year	Division A	Division B
2007		14th
2008		12th
2009		9th
2018		11th
2019		14th
2022		9th
2023		2nd place, silver medalist(s)
2024	14th	

== See also ==
- Montenegro women's national basketball team
- Montenegro women's national under-18 basketball team
- Montenegro men's national under-17 basketball team
