= Sweden women's national under-16 basketball team =

Youth basketball team representing Sweden

Sweden
- FIBA zone: FIBA Europe
- National federation: Swedish Basketball Federation

U17 World Cup
- Appearances: None

U16 EuroBasket
- Appearances: 14
- Medals: None

U16 EuroBasket Division B
- Appearances: 10
- Medals: Gold: 2 (2006, 2018); Bronze: 2 (2015, 2023)
Home	Away

The Sweden women's national under-16 basketball team is a national basketball team of Sweden, administered by the Svenska Basketbollförbundet. It represents the country in international under-16 women's basketball competitions.

== FIBA U16 Women's EuroBasket participations ==
Year	Division A	Division B
1976	15th	
1980	11th	
1982	11th	
2004		5th/6th
2005		6th
2006		1st place, gold medalist(s)
2007	5th	
2008	4th	
2009	13th	
2010	11th	
2011	8th	
2012	11th	

Year	Division A	Division B
2013	9th	
2014	16th	
2015		3rd place, bronze medalist(s)
2016	15th	
2017		7th
2018		1st place, gold medalist(s)
2019	16th	
2022		4th
2023		3rd place, bronze medalist(s)
2024	16th	
2025		13th
2026		Rank 2 trio

== See also ==
- Sweden women's national basketball team
- Sweden women's national under-18 and under-19 basketball team
- Sweden men's national under-16 basketball team
