= 2023 FIBA U16 Women's European Championship Division C =

Tournament details
- Host country: Andorra
- City: Andorra la Vella
- Dates: 18–23 July 2023
- Teams: 8 (from 1 confederation)
- Venue(s): 1 (in 1 host city)

Final positions
- Champions: Azerbaijan (1st title)
- Runners-up: Andorra
- Third place: Georgia

Official website
- www.fiba.basketball/history

The 2023 FIBA U16 Women's European Championship Division C was the 17th edition of the Division C of the FIBA U16 Women's European Championship, the third tier of the European women's under-16 basketball championship. It was played from 18 to 23 July 2023 in Andorra la Vella, Andorra. Azerbaijan won the tournament at their premiere in any women's youth basketball category.

== Participating teams ==
- Albania
- Andorra
- Armenia
- Azerbaijan
- Georgia
- Gibraltar
- Malta
- Moldova

== First round ==
The draw of the first round was held on 14 February 2023 in Freising, Germany.

In the first round, the teams were drawn into two groups of four. The first two teams from each group advanced to the semifinals; the other teams advanced to the 5th–8th place playoffs.

=== Group A ===
| Pos | Team | Pld | W | L | PF | PA | PD | Pts | Qualification |
|---|---|---|---|---|---|---|---|---|---|
| 1 | Malta | 3 | 3 | 0 | 197 | 137 | +60 | 6 | Semifinals |
| 2 | Georgia | 3 | 2 | 1 | 271 | 172 | +99 | 5 | Semifinals |
| 3 | Armenia | 3 | 1 | 2 | 206 | 175 | +31 | 4 | 5th–8th place playoffs |
| 4 | Gibraltar | 3 | 0 | 3 | 85 | 275 | −190 | 3 | 5th–8th place playoffs |

Source: FIBA

18 July 2023
14:30

Boxscore

| Armenia | 99–36 | Gibraltar |
Scoring by quarter: 28–3, 25–5, 18–12, 28–16

Poliesportiu d'Andorra, Andorra la Vella

18 July 2023
17:00

Boxscore

| Georgia | 74–79 | Malta |
Scoring by quarter: 22–14, 11–19, 19–22, 22–24

Poliesportiu d'Andorra, Andorra la Vella

19 July 2023
12:00

Boxscore

| Malta | 62–46 | Armenia |
Scoring by quarter: 24–4, 12–16, 11–15, 15–11

Poliesportiu d'Andorra, Andorra la Vella

19 July 2023
14:30

Boxscore

| Gibraltar | 32–120 | Georgia |
Scoring by quarter: 6–27, 8–31, 10–39, 8–23

Poliesportiu d'Andorra, Andorra la Vella

20 July 2023
12:00

Boxscore

| Armenia | 61–77 | Georgia |
Scoring by quarter: 17–17, 18–15, 20–19, 6–26

Poliesportiu d'Andorra, Andorra la Vella

20 July 2023
14:30

Boxscore

| Malta | 56–17 | Gibraltar |
Scoring by quarter: 12–2, 13–8, 20–3, 11–4

Poliesportiu d'Andorra, Andorra la Vella

=== Group B ===
| Pos | Team | Pld | W | L | PF | PA | PD | Pts | Qualification |
|---|---|---|---|---|---|---|---|---|---|
| 1 | Azerbaijan | 3 | 3 | 0 | 211 | 169 | +42 | 6 | Semifinals |
| 2 | Andorra (H) | 3 | 2 | 1 | 184 | 135 | +49 | 5 | Semifinals |
| 3 | Albania | 3 | 1 | 2 | 194 | 187 | +7 | 4 | 5th–8th place playoffs |
| 4 | Moldova | 3 | 0 | 3 | 131 | 229 | −98 | 3 | 5th–8th place playoffs |

Source: FIBA
(H) Hosts

18 July 2023
12:00

Boxscore

| Moldova | 44–91 | Albania |
Scoring by quarter: 12–18, 16–19, 8–28, 8–26

Poliesportiu d'Andorra, Andorra la Vella

18 July 2023
19:30

Boxscore

| Andorra | 50–64 | Azerbaijan |
Scoring by quarter: 8–17, 10–22, 8–13, 24–12

Poliesportiu d'Andorra, Andorra la Vella

19 July 2023
17:00

Boxscore

| Azerbaijan | 78–55 | Moldova |
Scoring by quarter: 14–5, 18–8, 33–18, 13–24

Poliesportiu d'Andorra, Andorra la Vella

19 July 2023
19:30

Boxscore

| Albania | 39–74 | Andorra |
Scoring by quarter: 13–15, 12–21, 9–14, 5–24

Poliesportiu d'Andorra, Andorra la Vella

20 July 2023
17:00

Boxscore

| Albania | 64–69 | Azerbaijan |
Scoring by quarter: 19–18, 14–16, 8–16, 23–19

Poliesportiu d'Andorra, Andorra la Vella

20 July 2023
19:30

Boxscore

| Andorra | 60–32 | Moldova |
Scoring by quarter: 15–6, 15–10, 12–8, 18–8

Poliesportiu d'Andorra, Andorra la Vella

== 5th–8th place playoffs ==
5th–8th place semifinals
A3 | Armenia | 75
B4 | Moldova | 58
B3 | Albania | 80
A4 | Gibraltar | 28

5th place match
A3 | Armenia | 60
B3 | Albania | 65
7th place match
B4 | Moldova | 48
A4 | Gibraltar | 25

=== 5th–8th place semifinals ===
22 July 2023
12:00

Boxscore

| Armenia | 75–58 | Moldova |
Scoring by quarter: 9–17, 31–8, 17–18, 18–15

Poliesportiu d'Andorra, Andorra la Vella

22 July 2023
14:30

Boxscore

| Albania | 80–28 | Gibraltar |
Scoring by quarter: 21–4, 26–3, 10–17, 23–4

Poliesportiu d'Andorra, Andorra la Vella

=== 7th place match ===
23 July 2023
12:00

Boxscore

| Moldova | 48–25 | Gibraltar |
Scoring by quarter: 11–12, 15–4, 14–4, 8–5

Poliesportiu d'Andorra, Andorra la Vella

=== 5th place match ===
23 July 2023
14:30

Boxscore

| Armenia | 60–65 | Albania |
Scoring by quarter: 19–18, 20–13, 11–19, 10–15

Poliesportiu d'Andorra, Andorra la Vella

== Championship playoffs ==
Semifinals
A1 | Malta | 34
B2 | Andorra | 36
B1 | Azerbaijan | 74
A2 | Georgia | 72

Final
B2 | Andorra | 45
B1 | Azerbaijan | 57
3rd place match
A1 | Malta | 46
A2 | Georgia | 51

=== Semifinals ===
22 July 2023
17:00

Boxscore

| Malta | 34–36 | Andorra |
Scoring by quarter: 17–6, 4–9, 10–12, 3–9

Poliesportiu d'Andorra, Andorra la Vella

22 July 2023
19:30

Boxscore

| Azerbaijan | 74–72 | Georgia |
Scoring by quarter: 24–16, 16–26, 9–14, 25–16

Poliesportiu d'Andorra, Andorra la Vella

=== 3rd place match ===
23 July 2023
17:00

Boxscore

| Malta | 46–51 | Georgia |
Scoring by quarter: 10–9, 8–16, 15–13, 13–13

Poliesportiu d'Andorra, Andorra la Vella

=== Final ===
23 July 2023
19:30

Boxscore

| Andorra | 45–57 | Azerbaijan |
Scoring by quarter: 17–16, 6–18, 10–8, 12–15

Poliesportiu d'Andorra, Andorra la Vella

== Final standings ==
| Rank | Team |
|---|---|
| 1st place, gold medalist(s) | Azerbaijan |
| 2nd place, silver medalist(s) | Andorra |
| 3rd place, bronze medalist(s) | Georgia |
| 4 | Malta |
| 5 | Albania |
| 6 | Armenia |
| 7 | Moldova |
| 8 | Gibraltar |
