= 2024 FIBA U16 Women's EuroBasket Division C =

International basketball tournament

Tournament details
- Host country: Gibraltar
- Dates: 9–14 July 2024
- Teams: 8 (from 1 confederation)
- Venue: 1 (in 1 host city)

Final positions
- Champions: Azerbaijan (2nd title)
- Runners-up: Cyprus
- Third place: Albania

Tournament statistics
- MVP: (Azerbaijan) Angelina Ismayilova
- Top scorer: (Azerbaijan) Angelina Ismayilova (23.0 ppg)
- Top rebounds: (Moldova) Irina Nebesnaia (14.4 rpg)
- Top assists: (Azerbaijan) Leyla Allahverdiyeva (5.4 apg)
- PPG (Team): Azerbaijan (82.4 ppg)
- RPG (Team): Moldova (59.6 rpg)
- APG (Team): Azerbaijan (18.5 apg)

Official website
- www.fiba.basketball

The 2024 FIBA U16 Women's EuroBasket Division C was the 18th edition of the Division C of the FIBA U16 Women's EuroBasket, the third tier of the European women's under-16 basketball championship. The tournament was played in Gibraltar from 9 to 14 July 2024.

== Participating teams ==
- Albania
- Armenia
- Azerbaijan
- Cyprus ▼ (20th place, 2023 FIBA U16 Women's European Championship Division B)
- Georgia
- Gibraltar
- Malta
- Moldova

== First round ==
The draw of the first round was held on 6 February 2024 in Freising, Germany.

In the first round, the teams were drawn into two groups of four. The first two teams from each group advanced to the semifinals; the third and fourth teams advanced to the 5th–8th place playoffs.

All times are local (Central European Summer Time – UTC+2).

=== Group A ===
Pos	Team	Pld	W	L	PF	PA	PD	Pts	Qualification
1	Azerbaijan	3	3	0	251	144	+107	6	Semifinals
2	Cyprus	3	2	1	166	161	+5	5	Semifinals
3	Georgia	3	1	2	170	216	−46	4	5th–8th place playoffs
4	Armenia	3	0	3	176	242	−66	3	5th–8th place playoffs

Source: FIBA

9 July 2024
14:15

Boxscore

Armenia	59–86	Azerbaijan
Scoring by quarter: 13–20, 14–19, 19–21, 13–26
Pts: Gharib 16; Rebs: Derderian 8 Asts: Harutyunyan, Ohanian 3		Pts: Ismayilova 26; Rebs: Abbasova 18; Asts: Allahverdiyeva 8

Tercentenary Sports Hall
Referees: Alberto Sanchez Sixto (ESP), Claudia Ferrara (ITA), Azra Mušić (SLO)

9 July 2024
17:15

Boxscore

Georgia	47–48	Cyprus
Scoring by quarter: 10–15, 14–8, 18–16, 5–9
Pts: Sabadashvili 23; Rebs: Niguriani, Sabadashvili 13; Asts: Sabadashvili 4		Pts: Demetriadi 13; Rebs: Demetriadi 9 Asts: Demetriadi 4

Tercentenary Sports Hall
Referees: James Kerry Dominique (GIB), Joana Pessoa (POR), Alexandra Subernetcaia (MDA)

10 July 2024
11:45

Boxscore

Azerbaijan	97–40	Georgia
Scoring by quarter: 29–6, 23–12, 23–13, 22–9
Pts: Ismayilova 24; Rebs: Allahverdiyeva 12; Asts: Allahverdiyeva 7		Pts: Mestumrishvili 10; Rebs: Niguriani 7 Asts: Kakhetelidze 5

Tercentenary Sports Hall
Referees: James Kerry Dominique (GIB), Azra Mušić (SLO), Alexandra Subernetcaia (MDA)

10 July 2024
17:15

Boxscore

Cyprus	73–46	Armenia
Scoring by quarter: 13–13, 19–14, 25–9, 16–10
Pts: Hadjichristodoulou 19; Rebs: Demetriadi 10; Asts: Leontiou 3		Pts: Shajanian 11; Rebs: Khachatryan 14; Asts: Shajanian 3

Tercentenary Sports Hall
Referees: Alberto Sanchez Sixto (ESP), Claudia Ferrara (ITA), Joana Pessoa (POR)

11 July 2024
11:45

Boxscore

Azerbaijan	68–45	Cyprus
Scoring by quarter: 19–8, 21–14, 18–13, 10–10
Pts: Ismayilova 28; Rebs: Allahverdiyeva, Niftaliyeva 13; Asts: Allahverdiyeva, Gokcol 5		Pts: Koukouri, Demetriadi 8 Rebs: Demetriadi 6 Asts: Koukouri 3

Tercentenary Sports Hall
Referees: Alberto Sanchez Sixto (ESP), Diogo Martins (POR), Alexandra Subernetcaia (MDA)

11 July 2024
17:15

Boxscore

Georgia	83–71	Armenia
Scoring by quarter: 28–14, 20–26, 10–16, 25–15
Pts: Mestumrishvili 21; Rebs: Sabadashvili 13; Asts: Kakhetelidze 5		Pts: Gevorkova 22; Rebs: Gharib 16; Asts: Gharib 6

Tercentenary Sports Hall
Referees: James Kerry Dominique (GBR), Claudia Ferrara (ITA), Azra Mušić (SLO)

=== Group B ===
Pos	Team	Pld	W	L	PF	PA	PD	Pts	Qualification
1	Malta	3	2	1	184	113	+71	5	Semifinals
2	Albania	3	2	1	189	126	+63	5	Semifinals
3	Moldova	3	2	1	154	147	+7	5	5th–8th place playoffs
4	Gibraltar	3	0	3	87	228	−141	3	5th–8th place playoffs

Source: FIBA

9 July 2024
11:45

Boxscore

Malta	43–50	Albania
Scoring by quarter: 11–19, 9–10, 8–14, 15–7
Pts: Sammut, Farrugia 10; Rebs: Ferrando 11; Asts: Farrugia 3		Pts: Cela 12; Rebs: Kacorri 15; Asts: Cela 2

Tercentenary Sports Hall
Referees: Diogo Martins (POR), Jelena Tomic (CRO), Urfan Bayramli (AZE)

9 July 2024
19:45

Boxscore

Moldova	66–29	Gibraltar
Scoring by quarter: 20–4, 14–5, 15–12, 17–8
Pts: Donica 16; Rebs: Lisii 12; Asts: Pascalinaia 5		Pts: Dalmedo 15; Rebs: Dalmedo 16; Asts: Costa 4

Tercentenary Sports Hall
Referees: Kyriacos Christou (CYP), Marina Shalamberidze (GEO), Javier Torres Sanchez (ESP)

10 July 2024
14:15

Boxscore

Albania	52–57	Moldova
Scoring by quarter: 11–14, 16–17, 14–15, 11–11
Pts: Zyla 16; Rebs: Zyla 13; Asts: Zyla 4		Pts: Alfiorova 20; Rebs: Nebesnaia 22; Asts: Alfiorova, Lisii 2

Tercentenary Sports Hall
Referees: Kyriacos Christou (CYP), Urfan Bayramli (AZE), Alberto Sanchez Sixto (ESP)

10 July 2024
19:45

Boxscore

Gibraltar	32–75	Malta
Scoring by quarter: 8–19, 11–24, 4–15, 9–17
Pts: Dalmedo 16; Rebs: Dalmedo 12; Asts: Four players 1		Pts: Farrugia 17; Rebs: Portelli 14; Asts: Axisa 5

Tercentenary Sports Hall
Referees: Diogo Martins (POR), Jelena Tomic (CRO), Marina Shalamberidze (GEO)

11 July 2024
14:15

Boxscore

Malta	66–31	Moldova
Scoring by quarter: 29–8, 16–7, 9–7, 12–9
Pts: Portelli 25; Rebs: Portelli 9 Asts: Carabott 3		Pts: Alfiorova 9 Rebs: Nebesnaia 11; Asts: Trocina 5

Tercentenary Sports Hall
Referees: Javier Torres Sanchez (ESP), Jelena Tomic (CRO), Marina Shalamberidze (GEO)

11 July 2024
19:45

Boxscore

Gibraltar	26–87	Albania
Scoring by quarter: 2–22, 12–22, 6–31, 6–12
Pts: Dalmedo 14; Rebs: Dalmedo, Costa 9 Asts: Barbara 2		Pts: Gjyzeli 16; Rebs: Qoku 13; Asts: Zyla 5

Tercentenary Sports Hall
Referees: Joana Pessoa (POR), Kyriacos Christou (CYP), Urfan Bayramli (AZE)

== 5th–8th place playoffs ==
5th–8th place semifinals
A3	Georgia	77
B4	Gibraltar	41
B3	Moldova	75
A4	Armenia	82

5th place match
Georgia	71
Armenia	77
7th place match
Gibraltar	49
Moldova	82

=== 5th–8th place semifinals ===
13 July 2024
10:30

Boxscore

Georgia	77–41	Gibraltar
Scoring by quarter: 22–4, 26–7, 15–16, 14–14
Pts: Sabadashvili 22; Rebs: Sabadashvili 12; Asts: Kakhetelidze 7		Pts: Dalmedo 15; Rebs: Dalmedo 12; Asts: Reyes 4

Tercentenary Sports Hall
Referees: Diogo Martins (POR), Claudia Ferrara (ITA), Urfan Bayramli (AZE)

13 July 2024
13:00

Boxscore

Moldova	75–82	Armenia
Scoring by quarter: 19–16, 18–32, 19–16, 19–18
Pts: Alfiorova 27; Rebs: Lisii, Nebesnaia 8 Asts: Pascalinaia 2		Pts: Shajanian 34; Rebs: Gharib 11; Asts: Keklikian 6

Tercentenary Sports Hall
Referees: Alberto Sanchez Sixto (ESP), Kyriacos Christou (CYP), Azra Mušić (SLO)

=== 7th place match ===
14 July 2024
10:30

Boxscore

Gibraltar	49–82	Moldova
Scoring by quarter: 15–21, 9–24, 16–16, 9–21
Pts: Dalmedo 22; Rebs: Dalmedo 14; Asts: Reyes 2		Pts: Alfiorova 22; Rebs: Nebesnaia 20; Asts: Alfiorova 4

Tercentenary Sports Hall
Referees: Alberto Sanchez Sixto (ESP), Urfan Bayramli (AZE), Marina Shalamberidze (GEO)

=== 5th place match ===
14 July 2024
13:00

Boxscore

Georgia	71–77	Armenia
Scoring by quarter: 9–17, 19–20, 20–26, 23–14
Pts: Sabadashvili 25; Rebs: Niguriani 12; Asts: Tamar Kakhetelidze 2		Pts: Gevorkova 22; Rebs: Gevorkova 12; Asts: Shajanian 6

Tercentenary Sports Hall
Referees: Kyriacos Christou (CYP), Azra Mušić (SLO), Alexandra Subernetcaia (MDA)

== Championship playoffs ==
Semifinals
A1	Azerbaijan	92
B2	Albania	62
B1	Malta	48
A2	Cyprus	54

Final
Azerbaijan	69
Cyprus	52
3rd place match
Albania	43
Malta	41

=== Semifinals ===
13 July 2024
15:45

Boxscore

Azerbaijan	92–62	Albania
Scoring by quarter: 23–12, 33–10, 23–19, 13–21
Pts: Ismayilova 24; Rebs: Allahverdiyeva 19; Asts: Ismayilova 6		Pts: Nikaj 18; Rebs: Zyla 13; Asts: Zyla 5

Tercentenary Sports Hall
Referees: Javier Torres Sanchez (ESP), Jelena Tomic (CRO), Alexandra Subernetcaia (MDA)

13 July 2024
18:15

Boxscore

Malta	48–54	Cyprus
Scoring by quarter: 16–17, 15–17, 9–13, 8–7
Pts: Micallef 11; Rebs: Farrugia 9 Asts: Portelli, Farrugia 3		Pts: Koukouri 13; Rebs: Demetriadi 6 Asts: Four players 2

Tercentenary Sports Hall
Referees: James Kerry Dominique (GIB), Joana Pessoa (POR), Marina Shalamberidze (GEO)

=== 3rd place match ===
14 July 2024
15:45

Boxscore

Albania	43–41	Malta
Scoring by quarter: 11–10, 8–13, 13–11, 11–7
Pts: Cela 10; Rebs: Mucenji 13; Asts: Mucenji 2		Pts: Portelli 17; Rebs: Portelli 17; Asts: Axisa 4

Tercentenary Sports Hall
Referees: Diogo Martins (POR), Joana Pessoa (POR), Claudia Ferrara (ITA)

=== Final ===
14 July 2024
18:15

Boxscore

Azerbaijan	69–52	Cyprus
Scoring by quarter: 13–7, 21–12, 17–11, 18–22
Pts: Gokcol 28; Rebs: Abbasova 19; Asts: Allahverdiyeva, Gokcol 3		Pts: Hadjichristodoulou 14; Rebs: Demetriadi 10; Asts: Kyprianou 3

Tercentenary Sports Hall
Referees: Javier Torres Sanchez (ESP), James Kerry Dominique (GIB), Jelena Tomic (CRO)

== Final standings ==
Rank	Team
1st place, gold medalist(s)	Azerbaijan
2nd place, silver medalist(s)	Cyprus
3rd place, bronze medalist(s)	Albania
4	Malta
5	Armenia
6	Georgia
7	Moldova
8	Gibraltar
