= Berglind Katla Hlynsdóttir =

Icelandic basketball player

Long Island
- Position: Guard

Personal information
- Born: 22 May 2010 (age 16)
- Listed height: 184 cm (6 ft 0 in)

Career information
- High school: Long Island Lutheran (Brookville, New York, U.S.
- Playing career: 2024–present

Career history
- 2024–2026: Stjarnan
Medals
- FIBA U16 EuroBasket Division B MVP (2026)

Berglind Katla Hlynsdóttir (born 22 May 2010) is an Icelandic basketball player who plays as a guard for Long Island Lutheran High School in New York and represents the Iceland women's national basketball team.

== Playing career ==
Berglind began her basketball career with Stjarnan, making her debut in Iceland's top-tier Úrvalsdeild kvenna at the age of 14 in October 2024. She appeared in 14 games during the season, averaging 5.4 points per game. During her second season in the league, she averaged 12.6 points and 5.0 rebounds per game. During the playoffs, she became the youngest player to score 20 points in the Úrvalsdeild playoffs. Later that year, she moved to the United States to attend Long Island Lutheran High School.

== National team career ==
In 2026, she represented Iceland at both the FIBA U16 and U20 Women's European Championships. She was named the most valuable player of Tournament 3 at the 2026 FIBA U16 Women's EuroBasket Division B, averaging 32.3 points and 8.8 rebounds per game.

She made her senior international debut for Iceland in August 2026, aged 16. In November, she scored 14 points against Ireland and 23 against Switzerland in Iceland's opening pre-qualifying matches for EuroBasket 2029.

== Personal life ==
Berglind is the daughter of Hlynur Bæringsson, a former professional basketball player and Icelandic international.
