= 2025 FIBA U16 Women's EuroBasket Division C =

International youth basketball tournament

Tournament details
- Host country: Kosovo
- City: Peja
- Dates: 8–13 July 2025
- Teams: 8 (from 1 confederation)
- Venue: 1 (in 1 host city)

Final positions
- Champions: Cyprus (5th title)
- Runners-up: Armenia
- Third place: Albania

Official website
- www.fiba.basketball

The 2025 FIBA U16 Women's EuroBasket Division C was the 19th edition of the Division C of the FIBA U16 Women's EuroBasket, the third tier of the European women's under-16 basketball championship. The tournament was played in Peja, Kosovo, from 8 to 13 July 2025.

== Participating teams ==
- Albania
- Armenia
- Cyprus
- Georgia
- Gibraltar
- Kosovo ▼ (20th place, 2024 FIBA U16 Women's EuroBasket Division B)
- Malta
- Moldova

== First round ==
The draw of the first round was held on 28 January 2025 in Freising, Germany.

In the first round, the teams were drawn into two groups of four. The first two teams from each group will advance to the semifinals; the third and fourth teams will advance to the 5th–8th place playoffs.

All times are local (Central European Summer Time – UTC+2).

=== Group A ===
Pos	Team	Pld	W	L	PF	PA	PD	Pts	Qualification
1	Cyprus	3	3	0	246	123	+123	6	Semifinals
2	Armenia	3	2	1	255	176	+79	5	Semifinals
3	Georgia	3	1	2	203	174	+29	4	5th–8th place playoffs
4	Gibraltar	3	0	3	97	328	−231	3	5th–8th place playoffs

Source: FIBA

8 July 2025
13:00

Boxscore

Gibraltar	21–113	Cyprus
Scoring by quarter: 12–37, 2–30, 0–23, 7–23

Palestra e Sporteve Karagaç

8 July 2025
18:00

Boxscore

Georgia	57–84	Armenia
Scoring by quarter: 13–26, 23–22, 9–16, 12–20

Palestra e Sporteve Karagaç

9 July 2025
13:00

Boxscore

Armenia	102–46	Gibraltar
Scoring by quarter: 25–7, 35–19, 26–12, 16–8

Palestra e Sporteve Karagaç

9 July 2025
15:30

Boxscore

Cyprus	60–33	Georgia
Scoring by quarter: 21–6, 12–8, 19–6, 8–13

Palestra e Sporteve Karagaç

10 July 2025
13:00

Boxscore

Armenia	69–73	Cyprus
Scoring by quarter: 9–21, 26–15, 24–18, 10–19

Palestra e Sporteve Karagaç

10 July 2025
18:00

Boxscore

Gibraltar	30–113	Georgia
Scoring by quarter: 4–32, 8–17, 4–30, 14–34

Palestra e Sporteve Karagaç

=== Group B ===
Pos	Team	Pld	W	L	PF	PA	PD	Pts	Qualification
1	Malta	3	3	0	222	101	+121	6	Semifinals
2	Albania	3	2	1	168	147	+21	5	Semifinals
3	Kosovo	3	1	2	147	176	−29	4	5th–8th place playoffs
4	Moldova	3	0	3	100	213	−113	3	5th–8th place playoffs

Source: FIBA

8 July 2025
15:30

Boxscore

Moldova	12–90	Malta
Scoring by quarter: 2–24, 1–23, 4–30, 5–13

Palestra e Sporteve Karagaç

8 July 2025
20:30

Boxscore

Kosovo	43–60	Albania
Scoring by quarter: 10–18, 14–15, 13–11, 6–16

Palestra e Sporteve Karagaç

9 July 2025
18:00

Boxscore

Albania	67–45	Moldova
Scoring by quarter: 17–13, 22–10, 19–10, 9–12

Palestra e Sporteve Karagaç

9 July 2025
20:30

Boxscore

Malta	73–48	Kosovo
Scoring by quarter: 25–12, 18–12, 14–14, 16–10

Palestra e Sporteve Karagaç

10 July 2025
15:30

Boxscore

Albania	41–59	Malta
Scoring by quarter: 11–14, 2–8, 15–24, 13–13

Palestra e Sporteve Karagaç

10 July 2025
20:30

Boxscore

Moldova	43–56	Kosovo
Scoring by quarter: 9–13, 9–9, 17–21, 8–13

Palestra e Sporteve Karagaç

== 5th–8th place playoffs ==
5th–8th place semifinals
A3	Georgia	64
B4	Moldova	41
B3	Kosovo	74
A4	Gibraltar	35

5th place match
A3	Georgia	81
B3	Kosovo	67
7th place match
B4	Moldova	55
A4	Gibraltar	33

=== 5th–8th place semifinals ===
12 July 2025
13:00

Boxscore

Georgia	64–41	Moldova
Scoring by quarter: 18–10, 20–3, 4–15, 22–13

Palestra e Sporteve Karagaç

12 July 2025
15:30

Boxscore

Kosovo	74–35	Gibraltar
Scoring by quarter: 25–6, 22–12, 13–6, 14–11

Palestra e Sporteve Karagaç

=== 7th place match ===
13 July 2025
13:00

Boxscore

Moldova	55–33	Gibraltar
Scoring by quarter: 6–17, 16–9, 18–4, 15–3

Palestra e Sporteve Karagaç

=== 5th place match ===
13 July 2025
15:30

Boxscore

Georgia	81–67	Kosovo
Scoring by quarter: 22–16, 15–22, 30–10, 14–19

Palestra e Sporteve Karagaç

== Championship playoffs ==
Semifinals
A1	Cyprus	90
B2	Albania	56
B1	Malta	65
A2	Armenia	72

Final
A1	Cyprus	65
A2	Armenia	58
3rd place match
B2	Albania	61
B1	Malta	57

=== Semifinals ===
12 July 2025
18:00

Boxscore

Cyprus	90–56	Albania
Scoring by quarter: 30–9, 10–15, 33–12, 17–20

Palestra e Sporteve Karagaç

12 July 2025
20:30

Boxscore

Malta	65–72	Armenia
Scoring by quarter: 19–16, 10–21, 11–18, 25–17

Palestra e Sporteve Karagaç

=== 3rd place match ===
13 July 2025
18:00

Boxscore

Albania	61–57	Malta
Scoring by quarter: 15–10, 11–19, 17–18, 18–10

Palestra e Sporteve Karagaç

=== Final ===
13 July 2025
20:30

Boxscore

Cyprus	65–58	Armenia
Scoring by quarter: 21–17, 17–10, 16–13, 11–18

Palestra e Sporteve Karagaç

== Final standings ==
Rank	Team
1st place, gold medalist(s)	Cyprus
2nd place, silver medalist(s)	Armenia
3rd place, bronze medalist(s)	Albania
4	Malta
5	Georgia
6	Kosovo
7	Moldova
8	Gibraltar
