= Tamara Nikolla Sports Palace =

Sports arena in Korçë, Albania

- Pallati I Sportit Tamara Nikolla
- Interactive map of Tamara Nikolla Sports Palace
- Former names: Korça Sports Palace (–1994)
- Location: 3 Bulevardi Rilindasit, Korçe, Albania
- Owner: Municipality of Korçë
- Operator: Municipality of Korçë
- Capacity: 2,400

Construction
- Built: 1975

Tenants
- KB Skënderbeu; KV Skënderbeu

Tamara Nikolla Sports Palace is a multi-use sports arena in Korçë, Albania. It is owned and operated by the Municipality of Korçë and it is the home of the multidisciplinary KS Skënderbeu. The arena is located next to the Skënderbeu Stadium.
