= 2014 FIBA Under-17 World Championship for Women =

Tournament details
- Host country: Czech Republic
- Cities: Klatovy, Plzeň
- Dates: 28 June – 6 July
- Teams: 16 (from 5 confederations)
- Venues: 2 (in 2 host cities)

Final positions
- Champions: United States (3rd title)

Tournament statistics
- MVP: (Spain) Ángela Salvadores
- Top scorer: (Spain) Salvadores (19.9)
- Top rebounds: (South Korea) Park (13.4)
- Top assists: (South Korea) An (3.9)
- PPG (Team): United States (82.9)
- RPG (Team): Australia; United States (52.7)
- APG (Team): Spain (18.0)

Official website
- www.fiba.basketball

The 2014 FIBA Under-17 World Championship for Women (Czech: Mistrovství světa v basketbalu žen do 17 let 2014) was an international basketball competition held in Klatovy and Plzeň, Czech Republic, from 28 June to 6 July 2014. It was the third edition of the Under-17 Women's World Championship.

Slovakia were to originally host the championship, but its national federation was suspended by the FIBA Central Board on 7 April. The Slovakian team still participated provided they meet the conditions imposed by FIBA. On 26 May, the FIBA Central Board lifted its suspension, and the national team can still participate. The tournament would still be hosted by the Czech Republic, though.

The United States successfully captured their third title in a row by defeating Spain, in a rematch of the last edition's final, 77–75 in the final.

== Qualification ==
16 teams were qualified for this edition:

- 2013 FIBA Africa Under-16 Championship for Women
  - Mali
  - Egypt
- 2013 FIBA Asia Under-16 Championship for Women
  - China
  - Japan
  - South Korea
- 2013 FIBA Americas Under-16 Championship for Women
  - United States
  - Canada
  - Brazil
  - Mexico
- 2013 FIBA Europe Under-16 Championship for Women
  - Spain
  - Czech Republic
    - The Czech Republic was awarded hosting duties on 7 April after the Slovakia Basketball Federation was suspended by the FIBA Central Board.
  - Hungary
  - Italy
  - France
- 2013 FIBA Oceania Under-17 Championship for Women
  - Australia
- Host nation
  - Slovakia
    - Slovakia's hosting duties were stripped on 7 April in favor of the Czech Republic when their national federation was suspended. The team's participation was pending the result of the suspension. FIBA lifted the suspension on 26 May, therefore allowing Slovakia to compete.

== Preliminary round ==
The draw was held in Bratislava, Slovakia on 26 February 2014.

=== Group A ===
Team	Pld	W	L	PF	PA	PD	Pts
Hungary	3	3	0	237	226	+11	6
Czech Republic	3	2	1	217	201	+16	5
Canada	3	1	2	203	194	+9	4
South Korea	3	0	3	166	202	−36	3

28 June
18:00

Boxscore

Czech Republic	61–51	South Korea
Scoring by quarter: 11–14, 15–11, 13–11, 22–15
Pts: Reisingerová 21; Rebs: Reisingerová 14; Asts: Malečková 6		Pts: Park Ji-su 22; Rebs: Park Ji-su 9 Asts: Park Ji-su 4

Zimní stadion Klatovy, Klatovy
Referees: Petros Papapetrou (GRE), Hortencia Sanchéz (MEX), Sarty Nghixulifwa (NAM)

28 June
20:15

Boxscore

Canada	73–76 (OT)	Hungary
Scoring by quarter: 11–20, 16–12, 21–18, 16–14, Overtime: 9–12
Pts: Carleton 20; Rebs: Carleton 8 Asts: Bailey, Carleton 3		Pts: Dubei 18; Rebs: Kiss 11; Asts: Studer 4

Zimní stadion Klatovy, Klatovy
Referees: Milosav Kaluđerović (MNE), Kate Webb (ENG), Christian Wilmore (BAH)

29 June
18:00

Boxscore

Hungary	88–85 (OT)	Czech Republic
Scoring by quarter: 26–20, 21–22, 14–12, 15–22, Overtime: 12–9
Pts: Dubei 27; Rebs: Kuttor 7 Asts: Weninger 3		Pts: Reisingerová 28; Rebs: Reisingerová 16; Asts: Malečková 7

Zimní stadion Klatovy, Klatovy
Referees: Tiara Cruse (USA), Nan Ye (CHN), Milosav Kaluđerović (MNE)

29 June
20:15

Boxscore

South Korea	47–68	Canada
Scoring by quarter: 5–22, 11–15, 20–14, 11–17
Pts: Kim Ye-jim 11; Rebs: Park Ji-su 15; Asts: Lee Ji-woo 4		Pts: Kirkpatrick 16; Rebs: Chandler 8 Asts: Kirkpatrick 6

Zimní stadion Klatovy, Klatovy
Referees: Borys Shulga (UKR), Si-Man Alice Lei (MAC), Aliaksandr Strytsa (BLR)

1 July
18:00

Boxscore

Czech Republic	71–62	Canada
Scoring by quarter: 23–14, 15–17, 14–15, 19–16
Pts: Reisingerová 27; Rebs: Reisingerová 15; Asts: Malečková 4		Pts: Carleton 21; Rebs: Carleton 6 Asts: Carleton 4

Zimní stadion Klatovy, Klatovy
Referees: Borys Shulga (UKR), Petros Papapetrou (GRE), Christian Wilmore (BAH)

1 July
20:15

Boxscore

Hungary	73–68	South Korea
Scoring by quarter: 24–9, 18–8, 19–30, 12–21
Pts: Kuttor 14; Rebs: Kuttor 19; Asts: Weninger 5		Pts: Park Ji-su 25; Rebs: Park Ji-su 6 Asts: An He-ji 11

Zimní stadion Klatovy, Klatovy
Referees: Hortencia Sanchéz (MEX), Zdenku Zubak (SVK), Kate Webb (ENG)

=== Group B ===
Team	Pld	W	L	PF	PA	PD	Pts
Spain	3	3	0	231	145	+86	6
Brazil	3	2	1	193	153	+40	5
Italy	3	1	2	137	173	−36	4
Egypt	3	0	3	149	239	−90	3

28 June
13:30

Boxscore

Brazil	87–47	Egypt
Scoring by quarter: 17–7, 17–10, 27–17, 26–13
Pts: Carneiro 16; Rebs: de Moura 7 Asts: de Carvalho 6		Pts: El-Gedawy 14; Rebs: El-Gedawy 5 Asts: El-Gedawy 2

Zimní stadion Klatovy, Klatovy
Referees: Aliaksandr Syrytsa (BLR), Si-Man Alice Lei (MAC), Zdenko Zubak (SVK)

28 June
15:45

Boxscore

Spain	71–39	Italy
Scoring by quarter: 25–8, 12–10, 21–8, 13–13
Pts: Salvadores 18; Rebs: Muhate, López 8 Asts: Salvadores 3		Pts: Ciavarella 12; Rebs: Cubaj 7 Asts: Zecchin 2

Zimní stadion Klatovy, Klatovy
Referees: Borys Shulga (UKR), Tiara Cruse (USA), Nan Ye (CHN)

29 June
13:30

Boxscore

Italy	33–54	Brazil
Scoring by quarter: 3–4, 2–15, 10–15, 18–20
Pts: Policari 14; Rebs: Porcu 6 Asts: Santucci 3		Pts: de Moura 14; Rebs: Josefino 8 Asts: Alexandrino 2

Zimní stadion Klatovy, Klatovy
Referees: Petros Papapetrou (GRE), Zdenko Zubak (SVK), Hortencia Sanchéz (MEX)

29 June
15:45

Boxscore

Egypt	54–87	Spain
Scoring by quarter: 9–19, 13–23, 17–27, 15–18
Pts: Mohamed 14; Rebs: El-Gedawy 6 Asts: Nady 3		Pts: Raventos, Junio 15; Rebs: Conde 5 Asts: Cazorla, Junio 4

Zimní stadion Klatovy, Klatovy
Referees: Sarty Nghixulifwa (NAM), Kate Webb (ENG), Christian Wilmore (BAH)

1 July
13:30

Boxscore

Brazil	52–73	Spain
Scoring by quarter: 15–22, 12–17, 15–17, 10–17
Pts: de Moura 13; Rebs: Alexandrino, de Moura 6 Asts: da Silva 3		Pts: Salvadores 18; Rebs: Salvadores 9 Asts: Salvadores 5

Zimní stadion Klatovy, Klatovy
Referees: Nan Ye (CHN), Milosav Kaluđerović (MNE), Sarty Nghixulifwa (NAM)

1 July
15:45

Boxscore

Italy	65–48	Egypt
Scoring by quarter: 14–7, 20–15, 11–12, 20–14
Pts: Santucci 14; Rebs: Keys, Cubaj 8 Asts: Santucci 5		Pts: Talaat 11; Rebs: Talaat 20; Asts: Talaat 3

Zimní stadion Klatovy, Klatovy
Referees: Tiara Cruse (USA), Si-Man Alice LEI (MAC), Aliaksandr Syrytsa (BLR)

=== Group C ===
Team	Pld	W	L	PF	PA	PD	Pts
Australia	3	3	0	176	139	+37	6
Japan	3	2	1	160	137	+23	5
Slovakia	3	1	2	152	143	+9	4
Mexico	3	0	3	114	183	−69	3

28 June
13:30

Boxscore

Australia	54–46	Japan
Scoring by quarter: 10–10, 17–9, 8–8, 19–19
Pts: Pineau 23; Rebs: Pineau 12; Asts: Tupaea 6		Pts: Endo 13; Rebs: Waki 14; Asts: Mizuno 4

Aréna Slovany, Plzeň
Referees: Markos Michaelides (SUI), Gentian Cici (ALB), Gizella Györgyi (NOR)

28 June
15:45

Boxscore

Mexico	36–54	Slovakia
Scoring by quarter: 5–12, 6–8, 10–17, 15–17
Pts: Rivera 10; Rebs: Pérez, Huidobro 6 Asts: Pérez 2		Pts: Stašová 12; Rebs: Striesová 10; Asts: Remenarová, Stašová 3

Aréna Slovany, Plzeň
Referees: Juan Fernández (ARG), Ahmed Al-Bulushi (OMA), David Romano (ISR)

29 June
13:30

Boxscore

Slovakia	51–58	Australia
Scoring by quarter: 12–19, 16–14, 13–7, 10–18
Pts: Stašová 17; Rebs: Sedlaková 6 Asts: Remenarová, Horvátová 3		Pts: Forcadilla 17; Rebs: Pineau, Forcadilla 6 Asts: Tupaea 5

Aréna Slovany, Plzeň
Referees: Yudith Hodelin (CUB), Hamid Mohamed (LIB), Gizella Györgyi (NOR)

29 June
15:45

Boxscore

Japan	65–36	Mexico
Scoring by quarter: 17–12, 13–10, 24–10, 11–4
Pts: Mizuno, Nishioka 11; Rebs: Mizuno 7 Asts: Endo 5		Pts: Rivera 8 Rebs: Huidobro 7 Asts: four players 1

Aréna Slovany, Plzeň
Referees: Susana López (ESP), Andreia Silva (ESP), Timoci Sailada (FIJ)

1 July
13:30

Boxscore

Australia	64–42	Mexico
Scoring by quarter: 12–15, 15–10, 19–11, 18–6
Pts: Kennedy-Hopoate 10; Rebs: Maley 11; Asts: Sharp 3		Pts: Rodríguez 11; Rebs: Ortíz 4 Asts: V. Mazzocco 2

Aréna Slovany, Plzeň
Referees: David Romano (ISR), Hamid Mohamed (LIB), Yudith Hodelin (CUB)

1 July
15:45

Boxscore

Slovakia	47–49	Japan
Scoring by quarter: 10–10, 14–11, 7–17, 16–11
Pts: Remenarová 13; Rebs: Striesová 7 Asts: Sedlaková, Kováčiková 2		Pts: Nishioka 11; Rebs: Nakada 10; Asts: four players 1

Aréna Slovany, Plzeň
Referees: Maripier Malo (CAN), Gentian Cici (ALB), Juan Fernández (ARG)

=== Group D ===
Team	Pld	W	L	PF	PA	PD	Pts
United States	3	3	0	235	103	+132	6
France	3	2	1	181	175	+6	5
China	3	1	2	145	177	−32	4
Mali	3	0	3	100	206	−106	3

28 June
18:00

Boxscore

United States	69–41	China
Scoring by quarter: 12–4, 14–15, 25–13, 18–9
Pts: Samuelson 22; Rebs: Cox 12; Asts: Ionescu 5		Pts: Wang Haimei, Wang Zhen 10; Rebs: Wang Zhen 6 Asts: Wang Haimei 5

Aréna Slovany, Plzeň
Referees: Susana López (ESP), Maripier Malo (CAN), Timoci Sailada (FIJ)

28 June
20:15

Boxscore

Mali	45–66	France
Scoring by quarter: 8–20, 10–8, 7–27, 20–11
Pts: A. Coulibaly 13; Rebs: M. Coulibaly 7 Asts: N'Diaye 3		Pts: Cammas 18; Rebs: Djaldi-Tabdi 10; Asts: four players 3

Aréna Slovany, Plzeň
Referees: Yudith Hodelin (CUB), Hamid Mohamed (LIB), Andreia Silva (BRA)

29 June
18:00

Boxscore

France	40–88	United States
Scoring by quarter: 11–24, 13–17, 15–21, 1–26
Pts: Chartereau 13; Rebs: Tadic 6 Asts: Duchet 3		Pts: Samuelson 17; Rebs: Cox 8 Asts: Durr 4

Aréna Slovany, Plzeň
Referees: Markos Michaelides (SUI), Gentian Cici (ALB), Juan Fernández (ARG)

29 June
20:15

Boxscore

China	62–33	Mali
Scoring by quarter: 8–5, 15–7, 23–11, 16–10
Pts: Wang Haimei 22; Rebs: Zhang Lingge 9 Asts: Dilana 5		Pts: N'Diaye 11; Rebs: M. Coulibaly 7 Asts: Maiga, O. Dembele 2

Aréna Slovany, Plzeň
Referees: Maripier Malo (CAN), Ahmed Al-Bulushi (OMA), David Romano (ISR)

1 July
18:00

Boxscore

United States	78–22	Mali
Scoring by quarter: 29–6, 21–4, 16–3, 12–9
Pts: Durr 15; Rebs: Boykin 13; Asts: Boykin 5		Pts: M. Coulibaly 9 Rebs: M. Coulibaly 8 Asts: S. Traore 3

Aréna Slovany, Plzeň
Referees: Markos Michaelides (SUI), Gizella Györgyi (NOR), Timoci Sailada (FIJ)

1 July
20:15

Boxscore

France	75–42	China
Scoring by quarter: 23–11, 20–12, 17–8, 15–11
Pts: Berkani 19; Rebs: Bienvenu 7 Asts: Djaldi-Tabdi 3		Pts: Wang Zhen 10; Rebs: Zhang Lingge, Ha Wenxi 4 Asts: Dilana 3

Aréna Slovany, Plzeň
Referees: Susana López (ESP), Ahmed Al-Bulushi (OMA), Andreia Silva (BRA)

== Final round ==
Round of 16
A1	Hungary	100
B4	Egypt	47
C2	Japan	69
D3	China	44
A3	Canada	52
B2	Brazil	40
C4	Mexico	35
D1	United States	91
A2	Czech Republic	61
B3	Italy	57
C1	Australia	72
D4	Mali	34
A4	South Korea	51
B1	Spain	80
C3	Slovakia	42
D2	France	47

Quarterfinals
A1	Hungary	61
C2	Japan	51
A3	Canada	45
D1	United States	86
A2	Czech Republic	61
C1	Australia	50
B1	Spain	73
D2	France	54

Semifinals
A1	Hungary	63
D1	United States	91
A2	Czech Republic	41
B1	Spain	73

Final
D1	United States	77
B1	Spain	75
Third place
A1	Hungary	67
A2	Czech Republic	61

=== Round of 16 ===
2 July
13:30

Boxscore

Canada	52–40	Brazil
Scoring by quarter: 13–13, 8–9, 12–12, 19–6
Pts: Carleton 19; Rebs: Yearwood 8 Asts: Kirkpatrick 4		Pts: de Moura 13; Rebs: de Moura 7 Asts: da Silva 4

Zimní stadion Klatovy, Klatovy
Referees: Petros Papapetrou (GRE), Aliaksandr Syrytsa (BLR), Hortencia Sanchéz (MEX)

2 July
13:30

Boxscore

Australia	72–34	Mali
Scoring by quarter: 11–8, 19–7, 23–8, 19–11
Pts: Kennedy-Hopoate 13; Rebs: Pineau 9 Asts: Sharp, Forcadilla 3		Pts: N'Diaye 15; Rebs: M. Coulibaly 9 Asts: three players 1

Aréna Slovany, Plzeň
Referees: Susana López (ESP), Ahmed Al-Bulushi (OMA), Timoci Sailada (FIJ)

2 July
15:45

Boxscore

Hungary	100–47	Egypt
Scoring by quarter: 27–11, 22–10, 27–15, 24–11
Pts: Dubei 18; Rebs: Kiss 11; Asts: Horváth 7		Pts: El-Gedawy 17; Rebs: El-Gedawy 7 Asts: three players 2

Zimní stadion Klatovy, Klatovy
Referees: Zdenko Zubak (SVK), Nan Ye (CHN), Sarty Nghixulifwa (NAM)

2 July
15:45

Boxscore

Japan	69–44	China
Scoring by quarter: 14–11, 17–8, 24–16, 14–9
Pts: Nakada 18; Rebs: Nishioka, Nakada 8 Asts: three players 2		Pts: Zhang Manman, Ha Wenxi 11; Rebs: Zhang Lingge 8 Asts: Zhang Manman 2

Aréna Slovany, Plzeň
Referees: Juan Fernández (ARG), Hamid Mohamed (LIB), Markos Michaelides (SUI)

2 July
18:00

Boxscore

Czech Republic	61–57	Italy
Scoring by quarter: 16–24, 17–15, 12–14, 16–4
Pts: Reisingerová 15; Rebs: Reisingerová 9 Asts: Soukalová 5		Pts: Santucci 15; Rebs: Porcu 7 Asts: Ciavarella 4

Zimní stadion Klatovy, Klatovy
Referees: Borys Shulga (UKR), Kate Webb (ENG), Milosav Kaluđerović (MNE)

2 July
18:00

Boxscore

Slovakia	42–47	France
Scoring by quarter: 14–4, 11–16, 13–10, 4–17
Pts: Remenarová 17; Rebs: Remenarová 11; Asts: Stašová 3		Pts: Bankole 22; Rebs: Chartereau 13; Asts: Bankole 2

Aréna Slovany, Plzeň
Referees: David Romano (ISR), Gentian Cici (ALB), Gizella Györgyi (NOR)

2 July
20:15

Boxscore

South Korea	51–80	Spain
Scoring by quarter: 11–15, 12–21, 8–18, 20–26
Pts: Park Ji-su 15; Rebs: Park Ji-su 16; Asts: Park Ji-su 3		Pts: Salvadores 22; Rebs: Salvadores 11; Asts: Cazorla 7

Zimní stadion Klatovy, Klatovy
Referees: Tiara Cruse (USA), Si-Man Alice Lei (MAC), Christian Wilmore (BAH)

2 July
20:15

Boxscore

Mexico	35–91	United States
Scoring by quarter: 14–23, 7–36, 9–18, 5–14
Pts: Ortiz 12; Rebs: Taylor 5 Asts: Rodríguez 3		Pts: Ogunbowale 19; Rebs: Samuelson 9 Asts: Ionescu 5

Aréna Slovany, Plzeň
Referees: Maripier Malo (CAN), Yudith Hodelin (CUB), Andreia Silva (BRA)

=== 9th–16th place playoffs ===
Quarterfinals
B4	Egypt	51
D3	China	68
B2	Brazil	60
C4	Mexico	44
B3	Italy	44
D4	Mali	46
A4	South Korea	55
C3	Slovakia	40

Semifinals
D3	China	44
B2	Brazil	48
D4	Mali	68
A4	South Korea	76

Ninth place
B2	Brazil	68
A4	South Korea	63
Eleventh place
D3	China	61
D4	Mali	27

Semifinals
5 July
Egypt	70
Mexico (OT)	76
5 July
Italy	57
Slovakia	38

Thirteenth place
6 July
Mexico	52
Italy	64
Third place
6 July
Egypt	55
Slovakia	63

==== 9th–16th place quarterfinals ====
4 July
09:00

Boxscore

Egypt	51–68	China
Scoring by quarter: 9–14, 10–18, 16–17, 16–19
Pts: Mohamed 16; Rebs: El-Gedawy 6 Asts: three players 2		Pts: Zhang Lingge 15; Rebs: Zhang Lingge 9 Asts: Zhang Lingge 5

Zimní stadion Klatovy, Klatovy
Referees: Milosav Kaluđerović (MNE), Yudith Hodelin (CUB), Tiara Cruse (USA)

4 July
11:15

Boxscore

Brazil	60–44	Mexico
Scoring by quarter: 16–6, 10–11, 17–12, 17–15
Pts: Motta 17; Rebs: de Carvalho 7 Asts: Alexandrino 3		Pts: Rodríguez 11; Rebs: V. Mazzocco 9 Asts: three players 2

Zimní stadion Klatovy, Klatovy
Referees: David Romano (ISR), Hamid Mohamed (LIB), Gizella Györgyi (NOR)

4 July
13:30

Boxscore

Italy	44–46	Mali
Scoring by quarter: 14–7, 9–20, 14–7, 7–12
Pts: Santucci 16; Rebs: Motta, Cubaj 6 Asts: five players 1		Pts: N'Diaye 25; Rebs: A. Coulibaly, M. Coulibaly 10; Asts: five players 1

Zimní stadion Klatovy, Klatovy
Referees: Aliaksandr Syrytsa (BLR), Nan Ye (CHN), Sarty Nghixulifwa (NAM)

4 July
15:45

Boxscore

South Korea	55–40	Slovakia
Scoring by quarter: 16–8, 14–9, 10–13, 15–10
Pts: Park Ji-su 19; Rebs: Park Ji-su 18; Asts: An He-ji 4		Pts: Horvátová 8 Rebs: Blanarová 11; Asts: three players 2

Zimní stadion Klatovy, Klatovy
Referees: Susana López (ESP), Ahmed Al-Bulushi (OMA), Timoci Sailada (FIJ)

==== 13th–16th place semifinals ====
5 July
09:00

Boxscore

Egypt	70–76 (OT)	Mexico
Scoring by quarter: 22–24, 13–15, 10–7, 18–17, Overtime: 7–13
Pts: Mohamed 21; Rebs: Hossam 10; Asts: Amr 5		Pts: Ramos 11; Rebs: Ramos 11; Asts: Rodríguez 3

Zimní stadion Klatovy, Klatovy
Referees: Petros Papapetrou (GRE), Nan Ye (CHN), Christian Wilmore (BAH)

5 July
11:15

Boxscore

Italy	57–38	Slovakia
Scoring by quarter: 9–9, 16–12, 13–10, 19–7
Pts: Porcu 12; Rebs: Cubaj 11; Asts: Porcu, Santucci 4		Pts: Mištinová 19; Rebs: Sedlaková 12; Asts: Kováčiková 2

Zimní stadion Klatovy, Klatovy
Referees: Markos Michaelides (SUI), Hamid Mohamed (LIB), Yudith Hodelin (CUB)

==== 9th–12th place semifinals ====
5 July
13:30

Boxscore

China	44–48	Brazil
Scoring by quarter: 9–13, 15–10, 11–10, 9–15
Pts: Wang Haimei 12; Rebs: Dilana 6 Asts: Wang Haimei, Zhang Manman 3		Pts: Motta 12; Rebs: Alexandrino 9 Asts: Alexandrino 5

Zimní stadion Klatovy, Klatovy
Referees: Maripier Malo (CAN), Hortencia Sanchéz (MEX), Stanislav Kučera (CZE)

5 July
15:45

Boxscore

Mali	68–76	South Korea
Scoring by quarter: 12–7, 20–20, 17–27, 19–22
Pts: N'Diaye 28; Rebs: M. Coulibaly 15; Asts: S. Traore 2		Pts: Park Ji-su 20; Rebs: Park Ji-su 15; Asts: Park Gyeon-grim 4

Zimní stadion Klatovy, Klatovy
Referees: Ivor Matějek (CZE), Si-Man Alice Lei (MAC), Gentian Cici (ALB)

==== 15th place game ====
6 July
09:00

Boxscore

Egypt	55–63	Slovakia
Scoring by quarter: 7–12, 14–14, 19–14, 15–23
Pts: Mohamed 19; Rebs: El-Gedawy 19; Asts: Hossam 4		Pts: Remenarová, Lelkes 14; Rebs: Remenarová 14; Asts: Remenarová, Sedlaková 3

Zimní stadion Klatovy, Klatovy
Referees: Ivor Matějek (CZE), Nan Ye (CHN), Kate Webb (ENG)

==== 13th place game ====
6 July
11:15

Boxscore

Mexico	52–64	Italy
Scoring by quarter: 10–21, 23–8, 8–5, 11–30
Pts: Ramos 10; Rebs: Ramos 7 Asts: Pérez, Ramos 2		Pts: Santucci 18; Rebs: Keys, Cubaj 6 Asts: Cubaj, Ciavarella 2

Zimní stadion Klatovy, Klatovy
Referees: Stanislav Kučera (CZE), Ahmed Al-Bulushi (OMA), Andreia Silva (BRA)

==== Eleventh place game ====
6 July
13:00

Boxscore

China	61–27	Mali
Scoring by quarter: 12–4, 12–10, 14–6, 23–7
Pts: Wang Zhen 17; Rebs: Dilana 10; Asts: Wang Zhen 5		Pts: M. Coulibaly 8 Rebs: O. Dembele 8 Asts: three players 1

Zimní stadion Klatovy, Klatovy
Referees: Juan Fernández (ARG), Gizella Györgiy (NOR), Sarty Nghixulifwa (NAM)

==== Ninth place game ====
6 July
15:45

Boxscore

Brazil	68–63	South Korea
Scoring by quarter: 12–14, 19–13, 10–20, 26–16
Pts: Carneiro 16; Rebs: de Moura 12; Asts: Carneiro, de Moura 2		Pts: Kim Ji-young, Park Ji-su 19; Rebs: Park Ji-su 14; Asts: An He-ji 5

Zimní stadion Klatovy, Klatovy
Referees: Milosav Kaluđerović (MNE), Yudith Hodelin (CUB), Tiara Cruse (USA)

=== 5th–8th place playoffs ===
Semifinals
5 July
Japan	45
Canada	46
5 July
Australia	65
France	48

Fifth place
6 July
Canada	39
Australia	69
Seventh place
6 July
Japan	65
France	60

==== 5–8th place semifinals ====
5 July
13:00

Boxscore

Japan	45–46	Canada
Scoring by quarter: 8–8, 12–11, 12–14, 13–13
Pts: Nakada 14; Rebs: Nishioka 13; Asts: Endo 3		Pts: Brewer 17; Rebs: Carleton 9 Asts: four players 2

Aréna Slovany, Plzeň
Referees: Susana López (ESP), Ahmed Al-Bulushi (OMA), Milosav Kaluđerović (MNE)

5 July
15:15

Boxscore

Australia	65–48	France
Scoring by quarter: 17–14, 16–5, 17–13, 14–16
Pts: Bibby 14; Rebs: Sharp 9 Asts: four players 2		Pts: Berkani 10; Rebs: Djaldi-Tabdi 6 Asts: Duchet 4

Aréna Slovany, Plzeň
Referees: Tiara Cruse (USA), Zdenko Zubak (SVK), Gizella Györgyi (NOR)

==== Seventh place game ====
6 July
13:30

Boxscore

Japan	65–60	France
Scoring by quarter: 18–10, 15–17, 10–17, 22–16
Pts: Kato 18; Rebs: Akagi 9 Asts: Akagi 4		Pts: Muzet 16; Rebs: Djaldi-Tabdi 13; Asts: Duchet, Berkani 3

Aréna Slovany, Plzeň
Referees: Aliaksandr Syrytsa (BLR), Hamid Mohamed (LIB), Hortencia Sanchéz (MEX)

==== Fifth place game ====
6 July
15:15

Boxscore

Canada	39–69	Australia
Scoring by quarter: 5–14, 12–17, 10–20, 12–18
Pts: Carleton 11; Rebs: van Leeuwen 7 Asts: Bailey 2		Pts: Maley, Rocci 10; Rebs: Maley 10; Asts: Tupaea 6

Aréna Slovany, Plzeň
Referees: David Romano (ISR), Si-Man Alice Lei (MAC), Zdenko Zubak (SVK)

=== Championship ===
==== Quarterfinals ====
4 July
13:00

Boxscore

Hungary	61–51	Japan
Scoring by quarter: 17–19, 18–7, 6–13, 20–12
Pts: Dubei 16; Rebs: Kuttor 14; Asts: Dubei, Aho 4		Pts: Endo 19; Rebs: Nakada 7 Asts: Endo 2

Aréna Slovany, Plzeň
Referees: Juan Fernández (ARG), Gentian Cici (ALB), Andreia Silva (BRA)

4 July
15:15

Boxscore

Canada	45–86	United States
Scoring by quarter: 5–16, 9–25, 12–27, 19–18
Pts: Brewer, Gilles 9 Rebs: van Leeuwen, Willock 6 Asts: Kirkpatrick 3		Pts: Holmes 24; Rebs: Ogunbowale 8 Asts: Durr 4

Aréna Slovany, Plzeň
Referees: Zdenko Zubak (SVK), Si-Man Alice Lei (MAC), Kate Webb (ENG)

4 July
18:00

Boxscore

Czech Republic	61–50	Australia
Scoring by quarter: 13–16, 12–9, 27–15, 9–10
Pts: Šipová 20; Rebs: Malečková, Šipová 9 Asts: Malečková, Matusková 2		Pts: Tupaea 14; Rebs: Sharp, Maley 10; Asts: Tupaea 3

Aréna Slovany, Plzeň
Referees: Markos Michaelides (SUI), Hortencia Sanchéz (MEX), Maripier Malo (CAN)

4 July
20:15

Boxscore

Spain	73–54	France
Scoring by quarter: 19–21, 15–7, 19–9, 20–17
Pts: Salvadores 18; Rebs: Salvadores 13; Asts: Salvadores 5		Pts: Bankole 14; Rebs: Bankole, Djaldi-Tabdi 7 Asts: Berkani 6

Aréna Slovany, Plzeň
Referees: Borys Shulga (UKR), Petros Papapetrou (GRE), Christian Wilmore (BAH)

==== Semifinals ====
5 July
18:00

Boxscore

Czech Republic	41–73	Spain
Scoring by quarter: 6–21, 9–19, 19–15, 7–18
Pts: Šipová 10; Rebs: Reisingerová 8 Asts: Reisingerová 4		Pts: Cazorla 13; Rebs: I. López 8 Asts: three players 3

Aréna Slovany, Plzeň
Referees: Juan Fernández (ARG), David Romano (ISR), Andreia Silva (BRA)

5 July
20:15

Boxscore

Hungary	63–91	United States
Scoring by quarter: 26–32, 13–14, 12–23, 12–22
Pts: Dubei 16; Rebs: Kiss 9 Asts: Weninger 4		Pts: Samuelson 25; Rebs: Anigwe 14; Asts: Durr 6

Aréna Slovany, Plzeň
Referees: Aliaksandr Syrytsa (BLR), Kate Webb (ENG), Sarty Nghixulifwa (NAM)

==== Third place game ====
6 July
18:00

Boxscore

Hungary	67–61	Czech Republic
Scoring by quarter: 13–25, 23–12, 15–11, 16–13
Pts: Kiss 21; Rebs: Kiss 10; Asts: Studer 4		Pts: Reisingerová 13; Rebs: Reisingerová 13; Asts: Reisingerová, Matusková 3

Aréna Slovany, Plzeň
Referees: Markos Michaelides (SUI), Susana López (ESP), Christian Wilmore (BAH)

==== Final ====
6 July
20:15

Boxscore

United States	77–75	Spain
Scoring by quarter: 17–16, 19–15, 22–25, 19–19
Pts: Cox 20; Rebs: Cox 12; Asts: Durr, Boykin 4		Pts: Salvadores 40; Rebs: Junio 8 Asts: Junio 4

Aréna Slovany, Plzeň
Referees: Petros Papapetrou (GRE), Gentian Cici (ALB), Maripier Malo (CAN)

== Final standings ==
Rank	Team	Record
Gold medal	United States	7–0
Silver medal	Spain	6–1
Bronze medal	Hungary	6–1
4	Czech Republic	4–3
5	Australia	6–1
6	Canada	3–4
7	Japan	4–3
8	France	3–4
9	Brazil	5–2
10	South Korea	2–5
11	China	3–4
12	Mali	1–6
13	Italy	3–4
14	Mexico	1–6
15	Slovakia	2–5
16	Egypt	0–7

== Awards ==
2014 Under-17 World Championship for Women winner

United States
Third title

Most Valuable Player
(Spain) Ángela Salvadores

All-Tournament Team

- (Spain) Ángela Salvadores
- (United States) Katie Lou Samuelson
- (United States) Joyner Holmes
- (Hungary) Virág Kiss
- (Hungary) Debora Dubei

== Statistical leaders ==
Points

Name	PPG
(Spain) Ángela Salvadores	19.9
(South Korea) Park Ji-su	18.6
(Hungary) Debora Dubei	15.6
(Czech Republic) Julia Reisingerová	15.3
(Canada) Bridget Carleton	14.4

Rebounds

Name	RPG
(South Korea) Park Ji-su	13.4
(Czech Republic) Julia Reisingerová	12.0
(Australia) Anneli Maley	11.4
(Mali) Mariam Coulibaly	9.0
(United States) Lauren Cox	8.4

Assists

Name	APG
(South Korea) An He-ji	3.9
(Spain) Ángela Salvadores	3.6
(United States) Asia Durr	3.4
(Australia) Tahlia Tupaea	3.4
(Spain) Maite Cazorla	3.0
(Spain) Iris Junio	3.0

Blocks

Name	BPG
(South Korea) Park Ji-Su	4.0
(United States) Lauren Cox	2.7
(Spain) Iho López	2.4
(Italy) Lorela Cubaj	2.0
(Czech Republic) Julia Reisingerová	1.7

Steals

Name	SPG
(Spain) Ángela Salvadores	3.7
(Mexico) Paulina Rodríguez	3.0
(Italy) Mariella Santucci	3.0
(Mali) Djeneba N'Diaye	2.7
(South Korea) An He-ji	2.6
(Spain) Laia Raventos	2.6
