= 2013 FIBA Europe Under-16 Championship for Women =

2013 FIBA U16 Women's European Championship
25th FIBA Under-16 Women's European Basketball Championship

Tournament details
- Host country: Bulgaria
- Dates: 1–11 August 2013
- Teams: 16 (from 1 confederation)
- Venues: 2 (in 2 host cities)

Final positions
- Champions: Spain (9th title)

Official website
- www.fibaeurope.com

The 2013 FIBA Europe Under-16 Championship for Women is the 25th edition of the FIBA Europe Under-16 Championship for Women. 16 teams feature in the competition, held in Varna and Albena, Bulgaria from 1 to 11 August 2013.

== Participating teams ==
- Belgium
- Bulgaria ▲ (Runners-up, 2012 FIBA Europe Under-16 Championship for Women Division B)
- Croatia
- Czech Republic
- Greece
- France
- Hungary
- Italy
- Latvia ▲ (3rd place, 2012 FIBA Europe Under-16 Championship for Women Division B)
- Lithuania ▲ (Winners, 2012 FIBA Europe Under-16 Championship for Women Division B)
- Netherlands
- Russia
- Slovakia
- Spain
- Sweden
- Turkey

== First round ==
The first-round groups draw took place on 8 December 2012 in Freising, Germany. In the first round, the sixteen teams were allocated in four groups of four teams each. The top three teams of each group will qualify for the Second Round. The last team of each group will play in the Classification Group G first, then in the 9th–16th place playoffs.

Team advances to the Second Round
Team will compete in the Classification Group G

=== Group A ===
Team	Pld	W	L	PF	PA	PD	Pts
Spain	3	3	0	191	134	+57	6
Croatia	3	2	1	195	134	+61	5
Greece	3	1	2	136	176	−40	4
Bulgaria	3	0	3	127	205	−78	3

1 August 2013
16:00

Report

Spain	62–58	Croatia
Scoring by quarter: 15-15, 17-19, 15-12, 15-12

Sport Hall Albena, Albena

1 August 2013
18:15

Report

Greece	63–52	Bulgaria
Scoring by quarter: 21-10, 6-22, 19-14, 17-6

Sport Hall Albena, Albena

2 August 2013
13:45

Report

Croatia	64–33	Greece
Scoring by quarter: 18-8, 10-10, 16-6, 20-9

University Sports Hall, Varna

2 August 2013
18:15

Report

Bulgaria	36–69	Spain
Scoring by quarter: 9-20, 6-17, 6-18, 15-14

University Sports Hall, Varna

3 August 2013
13:45

Report

Spain	60–40	Greece
Scoring by quarter: 16-13, 9-9, 15-6, 20-12

Sport Hall Albena, Albena

3 August 2013
18:15

Report

Bulgaria	39–73	Croatia
Scoring by quarter: 6-25, 12-14, 10-16, 11-18

Sport Hall Albena, Albena

=== Group B ===
Team	Pld	W	L	PF	PA	PD	Pts
Russia	3	3	0	233	139	+94	6
Latvia	3	2	1	155	172	−17	5
Turkey	3	1	2	138	188	−50	4
Sweden	3	0	3	173	200	−27	3

1 August 2013
13:45

Report

Russia	76–44	Turkey
Scoring by quarter: 12-16, 21-6, 22-13, 21-9
Pts: Vadeeva 13; Rebs: Vadeeva 12; Asts: Zaytseva 7		Pts: Kepenc 10; Rebs: Avci 11; Asts: Deniz 2

Sport Hall Albena, Albena

1 August 2013
20:30

Report

Sweden	56–65	Latvia
Scoring by quarter: 9-14, 16-14, 19-18, 12-19

Sport Hall Albena, Albena

2 August 2013
16:00

Report

Latvia	39–90	Russia
Scoring by quarter: 15-23, 4-24, 2-24, 18-19

University Sports Hall, Varna

2 August 2013
20:30

Report

Turkey	68–61	Sweden
Scoring by quarter: 12-11, 15-12, 19-15, 22-23
Pts: Kepenc 26; Rebs: Avci 10; Asts: 3 players tied with 2		Pts: Hakansson 17; Rebs: Hakansson 11; Asts: Hakansson 8

University Sports Hall, Varna

3 August 2013
16:00

Report

Russia	67–56	Sweden
Scoring by quarter: 9-20, 21-11, 20-12, 17-13

Sport Hall Albena, Albena

3 August 2013
20:30

Report

Latvia	51–26	Turkey
Scoring by quarter: 14-8, 7-6, 15-9, 15-3
Pts: D. Strautmane 20; Rebs: P. Strautmane 14; Asts: P. Strautmane 8		Pts: Kepenc 13; Rebs: Güclü 13; Asts: Ari 2

Sport Hall Albena, Albena

=== Group C ===
Team	Pld	W	L	PF	PA	PD	Pts
Italy	3	3	0	175	128	+47	6
Netherlands	3	1	2	183	160	+23	4
Belgium	3	1	2	127	159	−32	4
Lithuania	3	1	2	149	187	−38	4

1 August 2013
16:00

Report

Belgium	37–58	Italy
Scoring by quarter: 10-22, 12-16, 9-11, 6-9

University Sports Hall, Varna

1 August 2013
18:15

Report

Netherlands	86–54	Lithuania
Scoring by quarter: 25-8, 18-17, 27-14, 16-15

University Sports Hall, Varna

2 August 2013
13:45

Report

Lithuania	60–44	Belgium
Scoring by quarter: 16-10, 13-10, 16-9, 15-15

Sport Hall Albena, Albena

2 August 2013
18:15

Report

Italy	60–56	Netherlands
Scoring by quarter: 12-16, 14-11, 19-10, 15-19

Sport Hall Albena, Albena

3 August 2013
13:45

Report

Belgium	46–41	Netherlands
Scoring by quarter: 18-6, 13-14, 6-11, 9-11

University Sports Hall, Varna

3 August 2013
18:15

Report

Lithuania	35–57	Italy
Scoring by quarter: 12-20, 8-4, 6-20, 9-13

University Sports Hall, Varna

=== Group D ===
Team	Pld	W	L	PF	PA	PD	Pts
Hungary	3	2	1	178	134	+44	5
Czech Republic	3	2	1	172	151	+21	5
France	3	2	1	151	148	+3	5
Slovakia	3	0	3	127	195	−68	3

1 August 2013
13:45

Report

France	58–50	Czech Republic
Scoring by quarter: 16-7, 16-14, 14-13, 12-16

University Sports Hall, Varna

1 August 2013
20:30

Report

Hungary	73–41	Slovakia
Scoring by quarter: 21-11, 12-10, 20-9, 20-11

University Sports Hall, Varna

2 August 2013
16:00

Report

Slovakia	42–57	France
Scoring by quarter: 10-12, 12-10, 12-16, 8-19

Sport Hall Albena, Albena

2 August 2013
20:30

Report

Czech Republic	57–49	Hungary
Scoring by quarter: 9-11, 10-15, 20-13, 18-10

Sport Hall Albena, Albena

3 August 2013
16:00

Report

France	36–56	Hungary
Scoring by quarter: 7-13, 5-11, 10-18, 14-14

University Sports Hall, Varna

3 August 2013
20:30

Report

Slovakia	44–65	Czech Republic
Scoring by quarter: 11-17, 7-19, 10-17, 16-12

University Sports Hall, Varna

== Second round ==
Twelve advancing teams from the First Round will be allocated in two groups of six teams each. The top four teams of each group will advance to the quarterfinals. The last two teams of each group will play for the 9th–16th place against the teams from the Group G.

Team advances to Quarterfinals
Team will compete in 9th – 16th Place Playoff

=== Group E ===
Team	Pld	W	L	PF	PA	PD	Pts
Spain	5	5	0	325	270	+55	10
Russia	5	4	1	362	247	+115	9
Croatia	5	3	2	294	270	+24	8
Latvia	5	2	3	144	289	−145	7
Turkey	5	1	4	230	306	−76	6
Greece	5	0	5	214	287	−73	5

5 August 2013
13:45

Report

Greece	45–63	Russia
Scoring by quarter: 11-17, 7-14, 13-12, 14-20
Pts: Fasoula 17; Rebs: Fasoula 7 Asts: Kilazidou 3		Pts: Vadeeva 19; Rebs: Vadeeva 15; Asts: 4 players tied with 2

Sport Hall Albena, Albena
Referees: Tolga Sahin (ITA), Nuno Monteiro (POR), Peter Papp (HUN)

5 August 2013
16:00

Report

Turkey	57–72	Spain
Scoring by quarter: 13-17, 16-21, 16-13, 12-21
Pts: Kepenc 17; Rebs: Güclü 9 Asts: Uzun 4		Pts: Conde, Cazorla 13; Rebs: Lopez 15; Asts: Raventos 4

Sport Hall Albena, Albena
Referees: Vincent Delestrée (BEL), Iskren Manolov (BUL), Arturas Sukys (LTU)

5 August 2013
20:30

Report

Latvia	44–55	Croatia
Scoring by quarter: 10-9, 10-15, 11-11, 13-20
Pts: D. Strautmane 21; Rebs: D. Strautmane 11; Asts: D. Strautmane 7		Pts: Slonjsak 23; Rebs: 3 players tied with 17; Asts: Slonjsak 4

Sport Hall Albena, Albena
Referees: Stephen Ellis (ENG), Dariusz Zapolski (POL), Robert Paulik (CZE)

6 August 2013
16:00

Report

Turkey	44–41	Greece
Scoring by quarter: 14-13, 10-11, 10-11, 10-6
Pts: Korkmaz 19; Rebs: Avci 8 Asts: Korkmaz 4		Pts: Ntanou 11; Rebs: Fasoula 8 Asts: Kilazidou 7

University Sports Hall, Varna
Referees: Branislav Mrdak (SRB), Nuno Monteiro (POR), Alija Ferevski (MKD)

6 August 2013
18:15

Report

Spain	63–54	Latvia
Scoring by quarter: 17-14, 10-17, 18-12, 18-11
Pts: Conde 18; Rebs: Lopez, 12; Asts: Salvadores 4		Pts: Grabe 12; Rebs: D. Strautmane, P. Strautmane, 10; Asts: Kudule, P. Strautmane, 3

University Sports Hall, Varna
Referees: Tolga Sahin (ITA), Peter Papp (HUN), Robert Paulik (CZE)

6 August 2013
20:30

Report

Croatia	51–72	Russia
Scoring by quarter: 12-14, 10-20, 17-16, 12-22
Pts: Dojkić 16; Rebs: Stojsavljevic 8 Asts: Slonjsak, Goles 2		Pts: Vadeeva, Musina 18; Rebs: Vadeeva 17; Asts: Frolkina 4

University Sports Hall, Varna
Referees: Eddie Viator (FRA), Arturas Sukys (LTU), Gordon Barbara (MLT)

7 August 2013
16:00

Report

Russia	61–68	Spain
Scoring by quarter: 9-12, 16-17, 20-20, 16-19
Pts: Shataeva 14; Rebs: Vadeeva 13; Asts: Burovaya 5		Pts: Salvadores 21; Rebs: Lopez 11; Asts: Raventos 5

Sport Hall Albena, Albena
Referees: Milan Mazic (SRB), Vincent Delestrée (BEL), Peter Zenis (SVK)

7 August 2013
18:15

Report

Croatia	66–59	Turkey
Scoring by quarter: 25-14, 14-13, 13-15, 14-17
Pts: Slonjsak 26; Rebs: Kelava 12; Asts: Slonjsak 5		Pts: Kepenc 16; Rebs: Güclü 13; Asts: 7 players tied with 1

Sport Hall Albena, Albena
Referees: Eddie Viator (FRA), Peter Papp (HUN), Evgeny Vetrov (RUS)

7 August 2013
20:30

Report

Latvia	56–55	Greece
Scoring by quarter: 13-10, 10-13, 15-16, 18-16
Pts: D. Strautmane 17; Rebs: D. Strautmane 11; Asts: 3 players tied with 2		Pts: Kollatou 16; Rebs: Karlafti 7 Asts: Ntanou 5

Sport Hall Albena, Albena
Referees: Tolga Sahin (ITA), Iskren Manolov (BUL), Volodymyr Pediev (UKR)

=== Group F ===
Team	Pld	W	L	PF	PA	PD	Pts
Hungary	5	4	1	300	232	+68	9
Czech Republic	5	4	1	305	251	+54	9
Italy	5	3	2	267	267	0	8
France	5	3	2	265	269	−4	8
Belgium	5	1	4	232	321	−89	6
Netherlands	5	0	5	245	274	−29	5

5 August 2013
16:00

Report

France	57–63	Italy
Scoring by quarter: 8-16, 17-21, 12-14, 20-12
Pts: Bankole 20; Rebs: Bankole 14; Asts: Bankole 3		Pts: Pan 19; Rebs: Keys, Costa 8 Asts: Pan 4

University Sports Hall, Varna
Referees: Daniel Hierrezuelo (ESP), Elif Inci (TUR), Peter Zenis (SVK)

5 August 2013
18:15

Report

Czech Republic	68–49	Netherlands
Scoring by quarter: 11-6, 23-8, 16-19, 18-16
Pts: Sípová, Reisingerová 12; Rebs: Reisingerová, Sípová 6 Asts: Matusková 4		Pts: Westerik 13; Rebs: Ndiba 9 Asts: Kallenberg 2

University Sports Hall, Varna
Referees: Branislav Mrdak (SRB), Volodymyr Pediev (UKR), Evgeny Vetrov (RUS)

5 August 2013
20:30

Report

Belgium	50–81	Hungary
Scoring by quarter: 11-19, 13-25, 16-26, 10-11
Pts: Geldof 10; Rebs: Geldof 5 Asts: Ramette 5		Pts: Kuttor 20; Rebs: Kuttor 10; Asts: Studer 5

University Sports Hall, Varna
Referees: Milan Mazic (SRB), Luka Kardum (CRO), Bogdan Podar (ROU)

6 August 2013
13:45

Report

Italy	52–57	Czech Republic
Scoring by quarter: 9-19, 18-6, 11-17, 14-15
Pts: Santucci 10; Rebs: Costa, 7 Asts: 3 players tied with 2		Pts: Reisingerová, 16; Rebs: Reisingerová, 14; Asts: Sípová, 3

Sport Hall Albena, Albena
Referees: Stephen Ellis (ENG), Iskren Manolov (BUL), Bogdan Podar (ROU)

6 August 2013
16:00

Report

France	68–56	Belgium
Scoring by quarter: 10-14, 12-11, 24-16, 22-15
Pts: Bankole, 19; Rebs: Bienvenu, 12; Asts: Afonso, 3		Pts: Geldof, 16; Rebs: Henket, 8 Asts: Bastiaenssen, 5

Sport Hall Albena, Albena
Referees: Georgios Tanatzis (GRE), Evgeny Vetrov (RUS), Paul Unsworth (ENG)

6 August 2013
20:30

Report

Netherlands	45–54	Hungary
Scoring by quarter: 14-10, 10-23, 12-15, 9-6
Pts: Ndiba, 12; Rebs: Ndiba, 22; Asts: Kallenberg, Buderman, 2		Pts: Dubei, 14; Rebs: Kiss, 18; Asts: Kuttor, 3

Sport Hall Albena, Albena
Referees: Andris Aunkrogers (LAT), Peter Zenis (SVK), Luka Kardum (CRO)

7 August 2013
13:45

Report

Czech Republic	73–43	Belgium
Scoring by quarter: 13-8, 19-15, 26-13, 15-7
Pts: Reisingerová, 14; Rebs: Sípová, 9 Asts: Holesínská, 5		Pts: Frabel, 11; Rebs: Henket, 6 Asts: Ouahabi, 2

University Sports Hall, Varna
Referees: Andris Aunkrogers (LAT), Alija Ferevski (MKD), Gordon Barbara (MLT)

7 August 2013
16:00

Report

Netherlands	44–46	France
Scoring by quarter: 17-10, 10-12, 6-18, 11-6
Pts: Westerik 21; Rebs: Ndiba 16; Asts: Kallenberg 7		Pts: Bankole 17; Rebs: Bankole 10; Asts: Bienvenu, Lenglet 3

University Sports Hall, Varna
Referees: Stephen Ellis (ENG), Nuno Monteiro (POR), Elif Inci (TUR)

7 August 2013
20:30

Report

Hungary	60–44	Italy
Scoring by quarter: 13-6, 12-15, 13-16, 22-7
Pts: Kiss 14; Rebs: Kuttor 14; Asts: Dubei 5		Pts: Pan, Ciavarella 8 Rebs: Pan 7 Asts: 3 players tied with 2

University Sports Hall, Varna
Referees: Daniel Hierrezuelo (ESP), Dariusz Zapolski (POL), Arturas Sukys (LTU)

== Classification Group G ==
The last team of each group of the First Round will compete in this Classification Round.

Team	Pld	W	L	PF	PA	PD	Pts
Sweden	3	2	1	192	164	+28	5
Slovakia	3	2	1	186	166	+20	5
Lithuania	3	2	1	173	167	+6	5
Bulgaria	3	0	3	132	186	−54	3

5 August 2013
13:45

Report

Sweden	50–62	Lithuania
Scoring by quarter: 18-12, 11-12, 10-17, 11-18
Pts: Camber 11; Rebs: Camber, Hakansson 10; Asts: Hakansson 5		Pts: Knyzaite 17; Rebs: Juskaite 20; Asts: Petrenaite, Knyzaite 2

University Sports Hall, Varna
Referees: Andris Aunkrogers (LAT), Georgios Tanatzis (GRE), Gordon Barbara (MLT)

5 August 2013
18:15

Report

Bulgaria	46–53	Slovakia
Scoring by quarter: 8-9, 11-15, 15-17, 12-12
Pts: Nikolova 14; Rebs: Mancheva 11; Asts: 3 players tied with 2		Pts: Stasová 14; Rebs: Remenarova 10; Asts: 3 players tied with 3

Sport Hall Albena, Albena
Referees: Eddie Viator (FRA), Paul Unsworth (ENG), Alija Ferevski (MKD)

6 August 2013
13:45

Report

Slovakia	64–65 (OT)	Sweden
Scoring by quarter: 4-18, 16-17, 19-11, 19-12, Overtime: 6-7
Pts: Striesova 13; Rebs: Mistinova, Jelencikova 9 Asts: Striesova 2		Pts: Camber 19; Rebs: Camber 14; Asts: Hakansson 4

University Sports Hall, Varna
Referees: Daniel Hierrezuelo (ESP), Dariusz Zapolski (POL), Volodymyr Pediev (UKR)

6 August 2013
18:15

Report

Lithuania	56–48	Bulgaria
Scoring by quarter: 9-13, 14-8, 23-8, 10-19
Pts: Slavickaite 13; Rebs: Juskaite 6 Asts: Jurciute 3		Pts: Petrova 15; Rebs: Geraskova 8 Asts: Nikolova 3

Sport Hall Albena, Albena
Referees: Vincent Delestrée (BEL), Milan Mazic (SRB), Elif Inci (TUR)

7 August 2013
13:45

Report

Lithuania	55–69	Slovakia
Scoring by quarter: 13-26, 14-8, 12-18, 16-17
Pts: Juskaite 14; Rebs: Juskaite, Visockaite 9 Asts: Jurciute 4		Pts: Mistinova 22; Rebs: Blanarova 12; Asts: 3 players tied with 2

Sport Hall Albena, Albena
Referees: Branislav Mrdak (SRB), Paul Unsworth (ENG), Luka Kardum (CRO)

7 August 2013
18:15

Report

Bulgaria	38–77	Sweden
Scoring by quarter: 6-29, 7-12, 14-15, 11-21
Pts: Ilieva, Mancheva 7 Rebs: Natskina 8 Asts: Ilieva, Nikolova 2		Pts: Seman 14; Rebs: Hakansson 8 Asts: Hakansson 5

University Sports Hall, Varna
Referees: Georgios Tanatzis (GRE), Bogdan Podar (ROU), Robert Paulik (CZE)

== 9th – 16th Place Playoff ==
9 August 2013
13:45

Report

Turkey	79–76	Bulgaria
Scoring by quarter: 26-14, 18-24, 18-21, 17-17
Pts: Kepenc 22; Rebs: Kepenc 12; Asts: Uzun 6		Pts: G. Nikolova 18; Rebs: 3 players tied with 7 Asts: N. Nikolova, Koleva 3

University Sports Hall, Varna
Referees: Vincent Delestrée (BEL), Dariusz Zapolski (POL), Evgeny Vetrov (RUS)

9 August 2013
16:00

Report

Belgium	46–55	Slovakia
Scoring by quarter: 10-10, 18-10, 7-15, 11-20
Pts: Geldof 14; Rebs: Geldof 8 Asts: Ramette 5		Pts: Mištinová 16; Rebs: Remenárová 16; Asts: Striešová 3

University Sports Hall, Varna
Referees: Branislav Mrdak (SRB), Nuno Monteiro (POR), Elif Inci (TUR)

9 August 2013
18:15

Report

Netherlands	46–62	Sweden
Scoring by quarter: 7-11, 12-16, 11-23, 16-12
Pts: Ndiba 13; Rebs: Ndiba, Westerik 9 Asts: Ndiba, Westerik 3		Pts: Hakansson 21; Rebs: Waldling 12; Asts: 3 players tied with 2

University Sports Hall, Varna
Referees: Milan Mazić (SRB), Andris Aunkrogers (LAT), Luka Kardum (CRO)

9 August 2013
20:30

Report

Greece	49–46	Lithuania
Scoring by quarter: 16-14, 9-13, 12-8, 12-11
Pts: Fasoula 18; Rebs: Kollatou 12; Asts: Ntanou, Kilazidou 5		Pts: Juskaite 14; Rebs: Juskaite 13; Asts: 3 players tied with 2

University Sports Hall, Varna
Referees: Eddie Viator (FRA), Peter Papp (HUN), Paul Unsworth (ENG)

=== Classification games for 13th – 16th place ===
10 August 2013
13:45

Report

Bulgaria	43–69	Belgium
Scoring by quarter: 10-18, 16-12, 10-11, 7-28
Pts: Koleva, Nikolova 8 Rebs: Natskina, Nikolova 6 Asts: Ilieva 3		Pts: Ouahabi 17; Rebs: Ramette 10; Asts: Ouahabi 4

University Sports Hall, Varna
Referees: Georgios Tanatzis (GRE), Peter Papp (HUN), Gordon Barbara (MLT)

10 August 2013
16:00

Report

Netherlands	84–52	Lithuania
Scoring by quarter: 25-11, 22-14, 26-16, 11-11
Pts: Ndiba 19; Rebs: Ndiba, 13; Asts: van Vlijmen, Buderman 7		Pts: Juskaite 20; Rebs: Juskaite 12; Asts: 3 players tied with 2

University Sports Hall, Varna
Referees: Daniel Hierrezuelo (ESP), Volodymyr Pediev (UKR), Luka Kardum (CRO)

=== Classification games for 9th – 12th place ===
10 August 2013
18:15

Report

Turkey	29–56	Slovakia
Scoring by quarter: 5-13, 11-12, 4-17, 9-14
Pts: Kepenc 10; Rebs: Kepenc 9 Asts: Korkmaz, Uzun 2		Pts: Matejčíková 14; Rebs: Blanárová 9 Asts: Lelkes 4

University Sports Hall, Varna
Referees: Nuno Monteiro (POR), Paul Unsworth (ENG), Evgeny Vetrov (RUS)

10 August 2013
20:30

Report

Sweden	67–46	Greece
Scoring by quarter: 8-16, 20-13, 16-8, 23-9
Pts: Seman 19; Rebs: Camber 8 Asts: 5 players tied with 3		Pts: Fasoula 22; Rebs: Fasoula 10; Asts: Kilazidou 7

University Sports Hall, Varna
Referees: Tolga Sahin (ITA), Robert Paulik (CZE), Elif Inci (TUR)

== 1st – 8th Place Playoff ==
Quarter-finals
9 August 2013 – 13:45
Spain	48
France	43
9 August 2013 – 16:00
Hungary	75
Croatia	50
9 August 2013 – 18:15
Czech Republic	66
Latvia	56
9 August 2013 – 20:30
Russia	55
Italy	61

Semi-finals
10 August 2013 – 18:15
Spain	50
Hungary	49
10 August 2013 – 20:30
Czech Republic	73
Italy	54

Final
11 August 2013 – 18:30
Spain	54
Czech Republic	49
Third place
11 August 2013 – 16:15
Hungary	62
Italy	55

=== Quarterfinals ===
9 August 2013
13:45

Report

Spain	48–43	France
Scoring by quarter: 9-7, 15-9, 9-13, 15-14
Pts: Salvadores 10; Rebs: Lopez 16; Asts: Cazorla, Raventos 2		Pts: Bankole 13; Rebs: Bankole 16; Asts: Berkani, Lenglet 2

Sport Hall Albena, Albena
Referees: Tolga Sahin (ITA), Peter Zenis (SVK), Gordon Barbara (MLT)

9 August 2013
16:00

Report

Hungary	75–50	Croatia
Scoring by quarter: 21-9, 27-9, 13-18, 14-14
Pts: Kuttor 23; Rebs: Kuttor 16; Asts: Dubei 5		Pts: Slonjšak 14; Rebs: Stojsavljević 11; Asts: Dojkić 5

Sport Hall Albena, Albena
Referees: Georgios Tanatzis (GRE), Arturas Sukys (LTU), Robert Paulik (CZE)

9 August 2013
18:15

Report

Czech Republic	66–56	Latvia
Scoring by quarter: 23-15, 18-7, 14-21, 11-13
Pts: Soukalová, Matušková 13; Rebs: Soukalová 8 Asts: 3 players tied with 3		Pts: P. Strautmane 19; Rebs: P. Strautmane 12; Asts: P. Strautmane 5

Sport Hall Albena, Albena
Referees: Stephen Ellis (ENG), Iskren Manolov (BUL), Alija Ferevski (MKD)

9 August 2013
20:30

Report

Russia	55–61	Italy
Scoring by quarter: 16-26, 8-8, 15-12, 16-15
Pts: Musina 19; Rebs: Vadeeva 14; Asts: Vadeeva 3		Pts: Pan 24; Rebs: Keys, Costa 12; Asts: Santucci 6

Sport Hall Albena, Albena
Referees: Daniel Hierrezuelo (ESP), Bogdan Podar (ROU), Volodymyr Pediev (UKR)

==== Classification games for 5th – 8th place ====
10 August 2013
13:45

Report

France	70–65	Croatia
Scoring by quarter: 18-13, 21-19, 18-17, 13-16
Pts: Bankole 16; Rebs: Bankole 19; Asts: Bankole 4		Pts: Dojkić 25; Rebs: Stojsavljevic 8 Asts: Slonjsak 14

Sport Hall Albena, Albena
Referees: Andris Aunkrogers (LAT), Arturas Sukys (LTU), Alija Ferevski (MKD)

10 August 2013
16:00

Report

Latvia	37–71	Russia
Scoring by quarter: 13-24, 14-9, 7-18, 3-20
Pts: P. Strautmane, D. Strautmane 8 Rebs: D. Strautmane 8 Asts: D. Strautmane 2		Pts: Vadeeva 14; Rebs: Vadeeva 12; Asts: Frolkina 6

Sport Hall Albena, Albena
Referees: Eddie Viator (FRA), Dariusz Zapolski (POL), Peter Zenis (SVK)

=== Semifinals ===
10 August 2013
18:15

Report

Spain	50–49	Hungary
Scoring by quarter: 15-17, 10-10, 11-7, 14-15
Pts: Salvadores 22; Rebs: Muhate 10; Asts: Cazorla 4		Pts: Dubei 17; Rebs: Kuttor 11; Asts: Dubei 6

Sport Hall Albena, Albena
Referees: Branislav Mrdak (SRB), Stephen Ellis (ENG), Iskren Manolov (BUL)

10 August 2013
20:30

Report

Czech Republic	73–54	Italy
Scoring by quarter: 14-11, 13-20, 20-6, 26-17
Pts: Reisingerová 19; Rebs: Reisingerová 13; Asts: Fadrhonsová 5		Pts: Santucci 14; Rebs: Ciavarella 7 Asts: Porcu, Santucci 2

Sport Hall Albena, Albena
Referees: Milan Mazić (SRB), Vincent Delestrée (BEL), Bogdan Podar (ROU)

== Final classification games ==
=== Match for 15th place ===
11 August 2013
9:30

Report

Bulgaria	74–81	Lithuania
Scoring by quarter: 15-20, 27-16, 13-29, 19-16
Pts: Koleva, Ilieva 14; Rebs: Koleva, Ilieva 6 Asts: Ilieva 5		Pts: Juškaitė 18; Rebs: Juškaitė 12; Asts: Jurciute, Juškaitė 5

University Sports Hall, Varna
Referees: Stephen Ellis (ENG), Peter Papp (HUN), Elif Inci (TUR)

=== Match for 13th place ===
11 August 2013
14:00

Report

Belgium	48–47	Netherlands
Scoring by quarter: 7-19, 11-6, 8-14, 22-8
Pts: Geldof 12; Rebs: Geldof 10; Asts: Ouahabi 4		Pts: Ndiba, Kantebeen 13; Rebs: Bouman 12; Asts: Ndiba 3

University Sports Hall, Varna
Referees: Milan Mazić (SRB), Branislav Mrdak (SRB), Peter Zenis (SVK)

=== Match for 11th place ===
11 August 2013
11:45

Report

Turkey	49–65	Greece
Scoring by quarter: 9-18, 15-12, 12-20, 13-15
Pts: Kutlu 12; Rebs: Güner 8 Asts: Kepenc 2		Pts: Karlafti 21; Rebs: Fasoula 9 Asts: Kilazidou 7

University Sports Hall, Varna
Referees: Andris Aunkrogers (LAT), Volodymyr Pediev (UKR), Alija Ferevski (MKD)

=== Match for 9th place ===
11 August 2013
16:15

Report

Slovakia	51–58	Sweden
Scoring by quarter: 20-14, 14-13, 6-12, 11-19
Pts: Mištinová 17; Rebs: Hašková 9 Asts: Sedláková 3		Pts: Camber 14; Rebs: Waldling 14; Asts: Waldling 5

University Sports Hall, Varna
Referees: Dariusz Zapolski (POL), Bogdan Podar (ROU), Gordon Barbara (MLT)

=== Match for 7th place ===
11 August 2013
11:45

Report

Croatia	53–62	Latvia
Scoring by quarter: 10-13, 16-24, 10-16, 17-9
Pts: Slonjšak 24; Rebs: Kelava 9 Asts: Dojkić 4		Pts: D. Strautmane 23; Rebs: D. Strautmane 15; Asts: Rikveile 3

Sport Hall Albena, Albena
Referees: Vincent Delestrée (BEL), Paul Unsworth (ENG), Evgeny Vetrov (RUS)

=== Match for 5th place ===
11 August 2013
14:00

Report

France	62–61	Russia
Scoring by quarter: 20-18, 13-11, 13-12, 16-20
Pts: Tadic 14; Rebs: Chartereau 8 Asts: Bankole, Berkani 3		Pts: Vadeeva 18; Rebs: Vadeeva 16; Asts: 3 players tied with 3

Sport Hall Albena, Albena
Referees: Tolga Sahin (ITA), Nuno Monteiro (POR), Luka Kardum (CRO)

=== Bronze medal match ===
11 August 2013
16:15

Report

Hungary	62–55	Italy
Scoring by quarter: 17-6, 13-11, 15-13, 17-25
Pts: Dubei 19; Rebs: Dubei 10; Asts: Tóth, Studer 2		Pts: Pan 16; Rebs: Santucci, Cubaj 8 Asts: Santucci 3

Sport Hall Albena, Albena
Referees: Daniel Hierrezuelo (ESP), Iskren Manolov (BUL), Robert Paulik (CZE)

=== Final ===
11 August 2013
18:30

Report

Spain	54–49	Czech Republic
Scoring by quarter: 14-8, 8-4, 16-27, 16-10
Pts: Salvadores 22; Rebs: Muhate 13; Asts: Cazorla, Salvadores 2		Pts: Gaislerová 13; Rebs: Malečková 9 Asts: Malečková 4

Sport Hall Albena, Albena
Attendance: 500
Referees: Eddie Viator (FRA), Georgios Tanatzis (GRE), Arturas Sukys (LTU)

== Final standings ==
Rank	Team
1st place, gold medalist(s)	Spain
2nd place, silver medalist(s)	Czech Republic
3rd place, bronze medalist(s)	Hungary
4th	Italy
5th	France
6th	Russia
7th	Latvia
8th	Croatia
9th	Sweden
10th	Slovakia
11th	Greece
12th	Turkey
13th	Belgium
14th	Netherlands
15th	Lithuania
16th	Bulgaria

2013 FIBA Europe Women's Under-16 Championship winners

Spain
9th title

Qualified for the 2014 FIBA Under-17 World Championship for Women
Qualified as the host nation for the 2014 FIBA Under-17 World Championship for Women
Relegated to the 2014 FIBA Europe Under-16 Championship for Women Division B

=== All-Tournament Team ===
- (Spain) Ángela Salvadores
- (Hungary) Debora Dubei
- (Italy) Francesca Pan
- (Czech Republic) Julia Reisingerova
- (Russia) Maria Vadeeva
