= Mitsubishi Electric Koalas =

Mitsubishi Electric Koalas 三菱電機コアラーズ
- League: Women's Japan Basketball League
- Founded: 1956
- Arena: Dolphins Arena
- Capacity: 7,407
- Location: Nagoya, Aichi
- Website: www.mitsubishielectric.co.jp/basket/koalas/index.html
Home	Away

The Mitsubishi Electric Koalas (三菱電機コアラーズ, Mitsubishidenki Koarāzu) are a Japanese professional basketball team based in Nagoya, Aichi. The Koalas compete in the "Future" second division of the Women's Japan Basketball League (WJBL).

== Notable players ==
- Teresa Edwards
- Maki Eguchi
- Michiko Miyamoto
- Risa Nishioka
- Asako O
- Chika Sakuragi
- Asami Tanaka

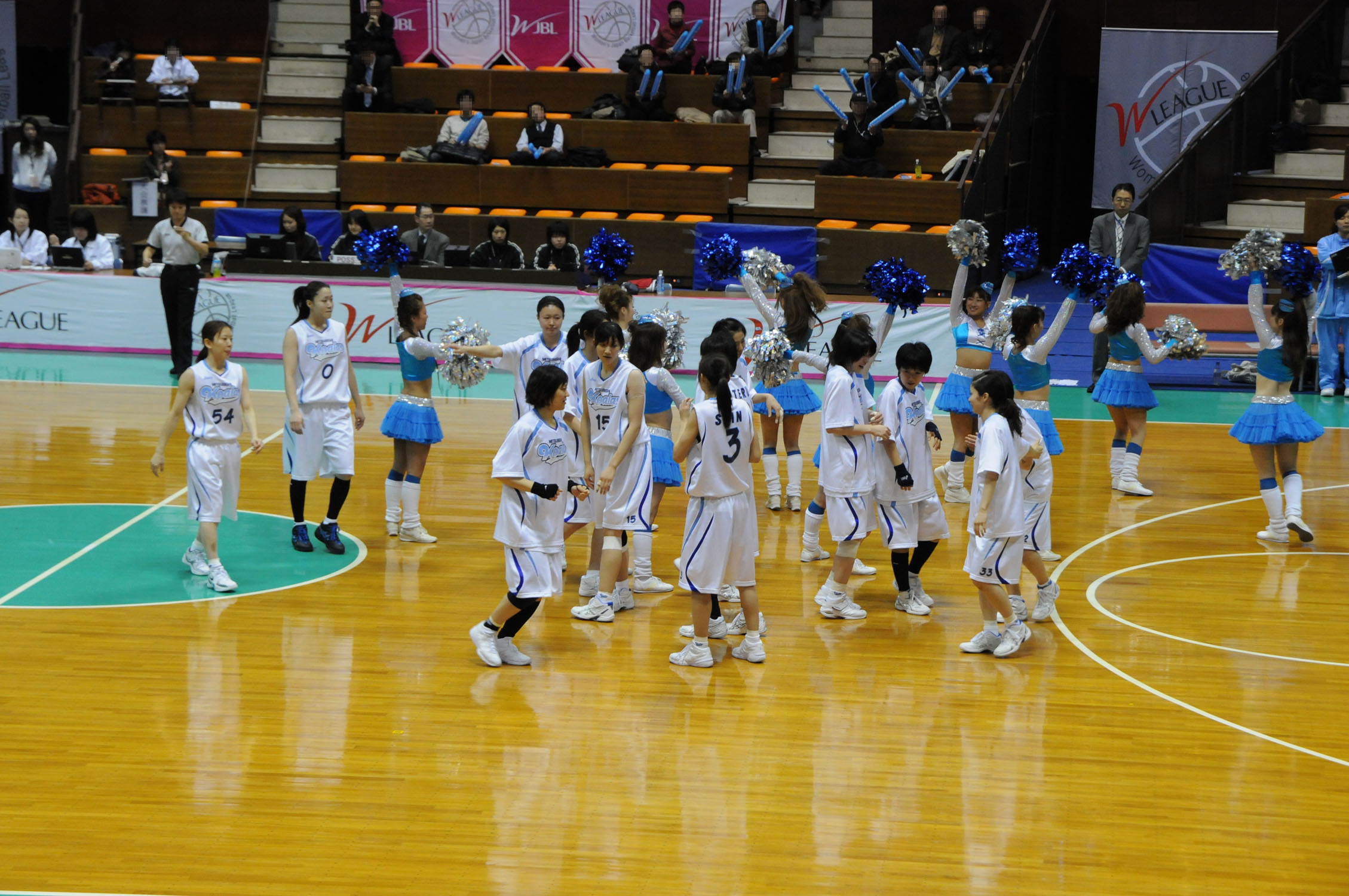

== Coaches ==
- Hiroko Tanabe

== Practice facilities ==
- Mitsubishi Electric Nagoya Gymnasium
