= Ángela Salvadores =

Spanish basketball player

Besiktas
- Position: Guard
- League: Liga Femenina de Baloncesto

Personal information
- Born: 10 March 1997 (age 29) Oviedo, Asturias, Spain
- Listed height: 1.78 m (5 ft 10 in)

Career information
- College: Duke (2015–2016)
- WNBA draft: 2019: 3rd round, 31st overall pick
- Drafted by: Los Angeles Sparks
- Playing career: 2013–present

Career history
- 2013–2014: Segle XXI
- 2014–2015: Rivas Ecópolis
- 2016–2017: Perfumerías Avenida
- 2017–2018: Sopron
- 2018-2019: Ensino
- 2021-2023: Valencia Basket
- 2023-2024: Basket Landes
- 2024: Movistar Estudiantes

Career highlights
- Hungarian League champion (2018); Spanish league champion (2017); Spanish cup champion (2017); FIBA Europe Young Women's Player of the Year Award (2014); European U-16 Championship MVP (2013); World U-17 Championship MVP (2014); European U-18 Championship MVP (2015)
- Stats at Basketball Reference

Ángela Salvadores Álvarez (born 10 March 1997) is a Spanish basketball player for Movistar Estdiantes. She played for Duke Blue Devils during the 2015–16 season.

== Club career ==
=== Early years ===
Salvadores started playing basketball in León, firstly at CD Maristas and later at CB Aros before joining the Segle XXI, the basketball team promoted by the Spanish Basketball Federation.

With Segle XXI, she joined the Liga Femenina 2 team in 2013, averaging 15.4 points per game when she was only 16 years old. One season later, Salvadores signed for one year with Rivas Ecópolis and debuted in Liga Femenina. She averaged 14.6 points per game.

=== Duke Blue Devils ===
In the summer of 2015, Salvadores left Spain to play in the NCAA Division I with the Duke Blue Devils during the 2015–16 season.

=== Perfumerías Avenida ===
On 27 April 2016, Perfumerías Avenida announced an agreement with Salvadores for the next three seasons. At the end of the first season, she decided to move to Hungarian team UNIQA Sopron

=== Sopron Basket ===
In her first season in Hungary, Salvadores reached the Final Four of the 2017–18 EuroLeague Women, finishing as runner-up. She won the 2018 Hungarian League

=== EuroLeague statistics ===
Season	Team	GP	MPP	PPP	RPP	APP
2016-17	(Spain) CB Avenida	10	9.9	2.4	1.0	1.4
2017-18	(Hungary) Sopron Basket	18	21.1	7.1	2.6	2.1
Total		28	17.1	5.4	2.0	1.8

== International career ==
Salvadores played with all the youth categories of the Spanish women's national team.

On 6 July 2014, she scored 40 points against United States in the final game of the 2014 Under-17 World Championship but finally Spain lost by 75–77.
