= Risa Nishioka =

Japanese basketball player (born 1997)

Risa Nishioka 西岡里紗
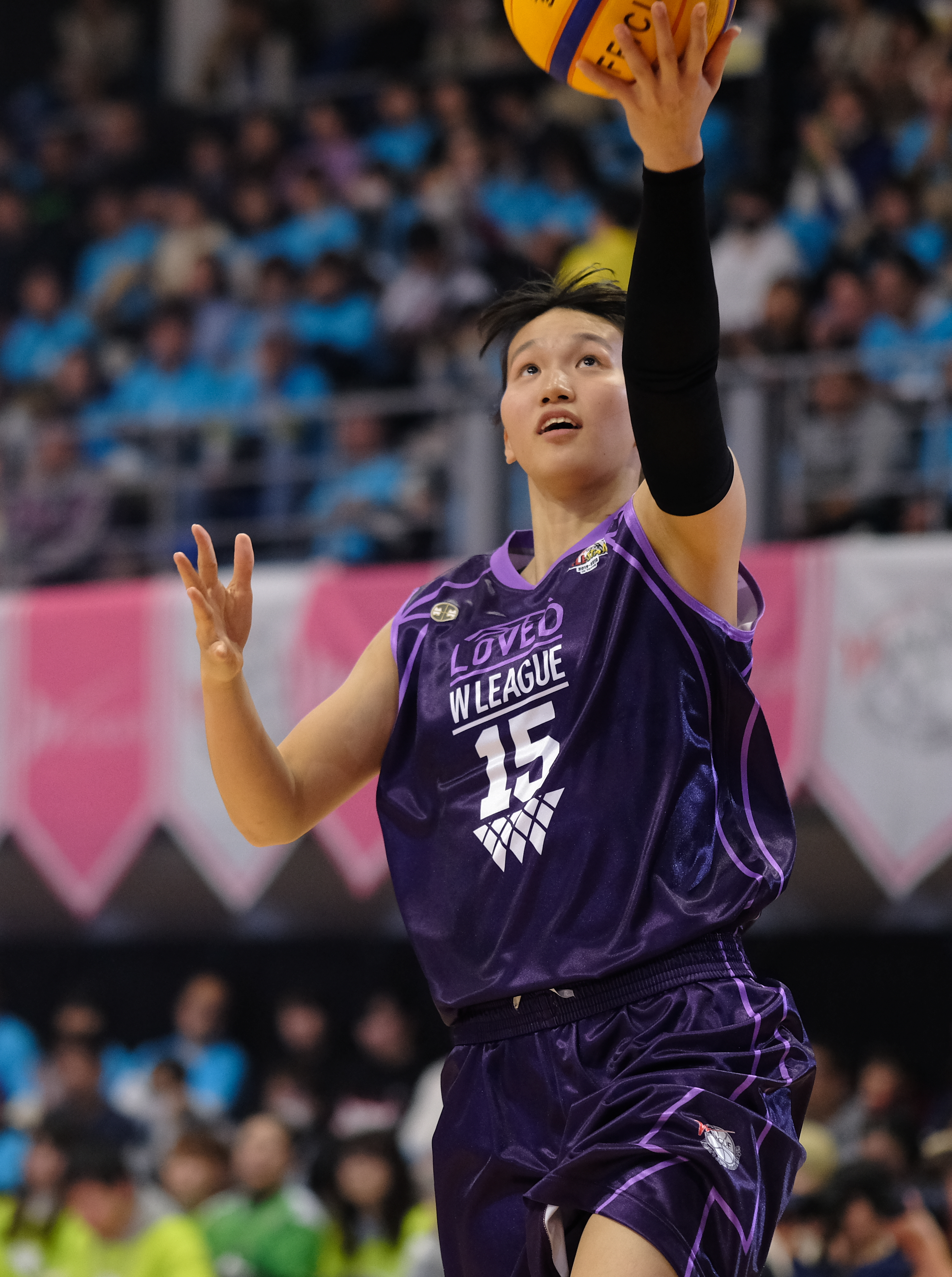

No. 15 – Mitsubishi Electric Koalas
- Position: Center
- League: Women's Japan Basketball League, FIBA 3X3

Personal information
- Born: March 3, 1997 (age 29) Ikoma, Nara
- Listed height: 6 ft 1 in (1.85 m)
- Listed weight: 165 lb (75 kg)

Career information
- High school: Osaka Tōin (Daitō, Osaka)
- Playing career: 2015–present

Career history
- 2015-present: Mitsubishi Electric Koalas

Career highlights
Medals
Women's basketball
Representing Japan
FIBA Asia Cup
| Gold medal – first place | 2021 Jordan |
Asia U-18 Championship
| Silver medal – second place | 2014 Amman | Team |
Asia U-16 Championship
| Silver medal – second place | 2013 Colombo | Team |
Women's 3x3 basketball
Representing Japan
FIBA Asia 3x3 Cup
| Bronze medal – third place | 2019 Changsha |
FIBA 3x3 Women's Series
| Gold medal – first place | 2019 Xiong An |
FIBA 3x3 Under-23 World Cup
| Gold medal – first place | 2019 Lanzhou |

Risa Nishioka (西岡里紗, Nishioka Risa; born March 3, 1997), nicknamed Haku, is a Japanese professional basketball player who plays for Mitsubishi Electric Koalas of the Women's Japan Basketball League . She also plays for Japan women's national 3x3 team.

== Personal ==
Her father Tsuyoshi Nishioka is a former professional baseball pitcher.
