= Serena-Lynn Geldof =

Belgian basketball player

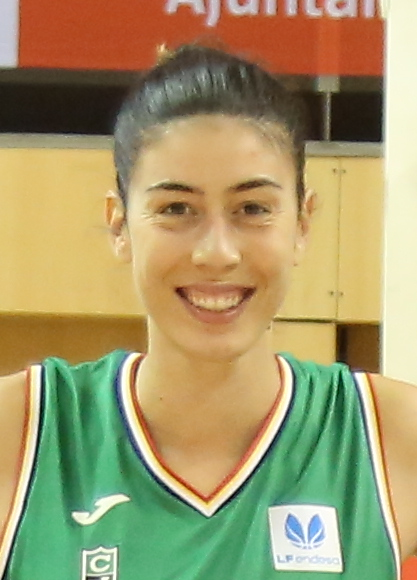
- Geldof with Joventut Badalona in 2024

No. 23 – Fenerbahçe
- Position: Center
- League: Turkish Super League; EuroLeague Women

Personal information
- Born: 2 March 1997 (age 29) Ostend, Belgium
- Listed height: 6 ft 5 in (1.96 m)

Career information
- College: Miami (Florida) (2016–2018)
- WNBA draft: 2019: undrafted

Career history
- 2018–2020: Namur-Capitale
- 2020–2021: Sedis Bàsquet
- 2021–2022: Promete Logroño
- 2022–2024: Zaragoza 2002
- 2024–2025: Joventut Badalona
- 2025–2026: Panathlitikos Sykeon
- 2026–present: Fenerbahçe

Serena-Lynn Geldof (born 2 March 1997) is a Belgian basketball player for Fenerbahçe and the Belgian national team. She played college basketball for the Miami Hurricanes in Miami, Florida. After two seasons, Geldof returned to Belgium and went professional.

She participated at the EuroBasket Women 2017 and the EuroBasket Women 2023.

== Honours and awards ==
=== National team ===
- EuroBasket Women: (gold) 2023 (bronze) 2017, 2021
- Belgian Sports team of the Year: 2020, 2023
