= Ornella Bankole =

French basketball player

- Bankole in 2026

No. 33 – Toronto Tempo
- Position: Forward
- League: WNBA

Personal information
- Born: 17 September 1997 (age 29) Auxerre, France
- Listed height: 1.81 m (5 ft 11 in)
- Listed weight: 72 kg (159 lb)

Career information
- WNBA draft: 2019: undrafted
- Playing career: 2017–present

Career history
- 2017–2020: Basket Lattes
- 2020–2022: Roche Vendée
- 2022–2023: Bourges
- 2023: Uni Girona
- 2024–2025: Flammes Carolo Basket
- 2025–present: Basket Zaragoza
- 2026–present: Toronto Tempo
- Stats at Basketball Reference

Ornella Bankole (born 17 September 1997) is a French basketball player for the Toronto Tempo of the Women's National Basketball Association (WNBA), Basket Zaragoza, and the French national team.

She represented France at the FIBA Women's EuroBasket 2019.

== Career ==
=== WNBA ===
On 29 June 2026, Bankole signed a player development contract with the Toronto Tempo.

== Career statistics ==
Legend
GP	Games played	GS	Games started	MPG	Minutes per game	RPG	Rebounds per game
APG	Assists per game	SPG	Steals per game	BPG	Blocks per game	PPG	Points per game
TO	Turnovers per game	FG%	Field-goal percentage	3P%	3-point field-goal percentage	FT%	Free-throw percentage
**Bold**	Career best	°	League leader

=== WNBA ===
WNBA regular season statistics
Year	Team	GP	GS	MPG	FG%	3P%	FT%	RPG	APG	SPG	BPG	TO	PPG
2026	Toronto	14	0	14.8	.459	.438	.857	2.3	1.1	.1	.0	.4	3.4
**Career**	1 year, 1 team	14	0	14.8	.459	.438	.857	2.3	1.1	.1	.0	.4	3.4
