= Debóra Dubei =

Hungarian basketball player

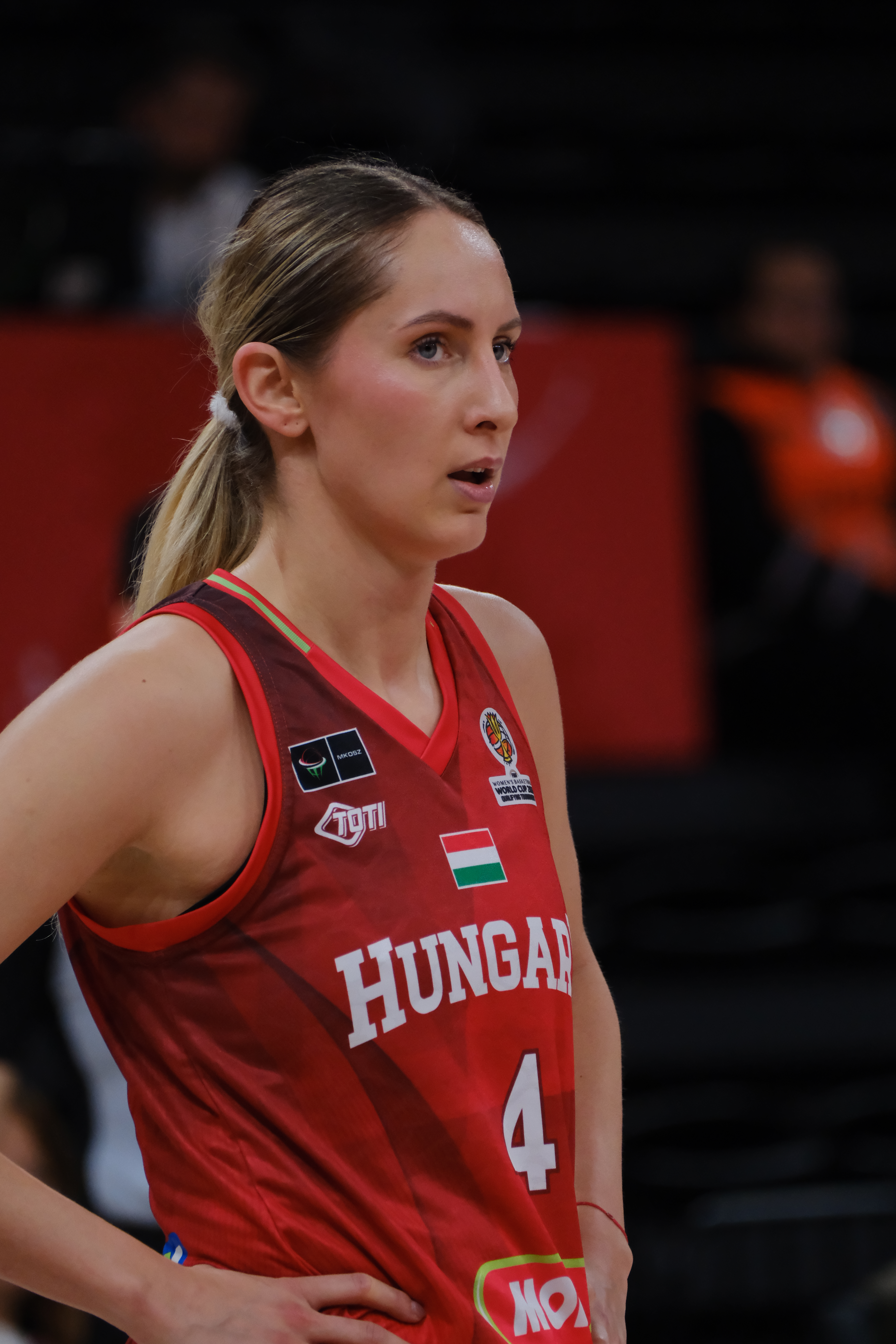
- Dubei in 2026

No. 41 – Uni Győr
- Position: Shooting guard
- League: NB I/A

Personal information
- Born: January 4, 1997 (age 29) Orosháza, Hungary
- Listed height: 6 ft 0 in (1.83 m)

Debóra Franciska Dubei (born January 4, 1997) is a Hungarian basketball player for UNI Győr and the Hungarian national team.

She participated at the EuroBasket Women 2017.
