= 1999 FIBA European Championship for Cadettes =

13th FIBA Under-16 Women's European Basketball Championship

Tournament details
- Host country: Romania
- Dates: 5–23 August 1998 (qualifying round); 6–24 April 1999 (challenge round); 23 July – 1 August 1999 (main tournament)
- Teams: 27 (qualifying); 12 (final tournament)
- Venue: (in 1 host city)

Final positions
- Champions: Spain (1st title)

The 1999 FIBA European Championship for Cadettes was the 13th edition of the European basketball championship for U16 women's teams, today known as FIBA U16 Women's European Championship. 12 teams featured in the competition, held in Tulcea, Romania, from 23 July to 1 August 1999.

Spain won their first title.

== Qualification round ==
24 countries entered the qualification round. They were divided in five groups. The top three teams of each group qualified for the Challenge Round.

Spain, Belarus and France received a bye to the Challenge Round.

Romania (as host), Russia (as incumbent champion) and the Czech Republic (as incumbent runner-up) received a bye to the main tournament and did not play in the qualification round or the Challenge Round.

=== Group A ===
The games were played in Riga, Latvia, from August 21 to 23, 1998.

Pos	Team	Pld	W	L	PF	PA	PD	Pts	Qualification	(Latvia)	(Italy)	(Belgium)	(Lithuania)
1	Latvia (H)	3	2	1	244	199	+45	5 (Note: Head-to-head record: 1) LAT 1–1 (+17), ITA 1–1 (–2), BEL 1–1 (–15).)	Challenge Round	—	79–80	81–63	84–56
2	Italy	3	2	1	206	191	+15	5	Challenge Round		—	56–59	70–53
3	Belgium	3	2	1	207	192	+15	5	Challenge Round			—	85–55
4	Lithuania	3	0	3	164	239	−75	3					—

Source: FIBA Archive
Rules for classification: 1) points; 2) head-to-head record.
(H) Hosts

=== Group B ===
The games were played in Snina, Slovakia, from August 5 to 9, 1998.

Pos	Team	Pld	W	L	PF	PA	PD	Pts	Qualification	(Federal Republic of Yugoslavia)	(Slovakia)	(Ukraine)	(Israel)	(North Macedonia)
1	Yugoslavia	4	4	0	229	151	+78	8	Challenge Round	—	65–49	36–35	69–41	59–26
2	Slovakia (H)	4	2	2	260	224	+36	6 (Note: Head-to-head record: 1) SVK 1–1 (+23), UKR 1–1 (+5), ISR 1–1 (–28).)	Challenge Round		—	55–62	80–50	76–47
3	Ukraine	4	2	2	193	176	+17	6	Challenge Round			—	47–49	49–36
4	Israel	4	2	2	194	231	−37	6					—	54–35
5	Macedonia	4	0	4	144	238	−94	4						—

Source: FIBA Archive
Rules for classification: 1) points; 2) head-to-head record.
(H) Hosts

=== Group C ===
The games were played in Škofja Loka, Slovenia, from August 5 to 9, 1998.

Pos	Team	Pld	W	L	PF	PA	PD	Pts	Qualification	(Greece)	(Hungary)	(Austria)	(Slovenia)	(Portugal)
1	Greece	4	4	0	278	150	+128	8	Challenge Round	—	69–51	73–28	56–42	80–29
2	Hungary	4	3	1	286	194	+92	7	Challenge Round		—	87–42	87–56	61–27
3	Austria	4	2	2	178	238	−60	6	Challenge Round			—	50–48	58–30
4	Slovenia (H)	4	1	3	200	232	−32	5					—	54–39
5	Portugal	4	0	4	125	253	−128	4						—

Source: FIBA Archive
Rules for classification: 1) points; 2) head-to-head record.
(H) Hosts

=== Group D ===
The games were played in Huskvarna, Sweden, from August 5 to 9, 1998.

Pos	Team	Pld	W	L	PF	PA	PD	Pts	Qualification	(Germany)	(Poland)	(Sweden)	(Republic of Ireland)	(England)
1	Germany	4	4	0	276	179	+97	8	Challenge Round	—	68–58	65–38	76–47	67–36
2	Poland	4	3	1	287	226	+61	7	Challenge Round		—	80–60	63–52	86–46
3	Sweden (H)	4	2	2	223	246	−23	6	Challenge Round			—	58–47	67–54
4	Ireland	4	1	3	209	233	−24	5					—	63–36
5	England	4	0	4	172	283	−111	4						—

Source: FIBA Archive
Rules for classification: 1) points; 2) head-to-head record.
(H) Hosts

=== Group E ===
The games were played in Adapazarı, Turkey, from August 5 to 9, 1998.

Pos	Team	Pld	W	L	PF	PA	PD	Pts	Qualification	(Croatia)	(Turkey)	(Bulgaria)	(Bosnia and Herzegovina)	(Malta)
1	Croatia	4	4	0	327	159	+168	8	Challenge Round	—	72–56	65–63	71–21	119–19
2	Turkey (H)	4	3	1	283	174	+109	7	Challenge Round		—	61–49	64–35	102–18
3	Bulgaria	4	2	2	279	180	+99	6	Challenge Round			—	84–39	83–15
4	Bosnia and Herzegovina	4	1	3	161	235	−74	5					—	66–16
5	Malta	4	0	4	68	370	−302	4						—

Source: FIBA Archive
Rules for classification: 1) points; 2) head-to-head record.
(H) Hosts

== Challenge Round ==
Eighteen countries entered the Challenge Round: fifteen from the qualification round and Spain, Belarus and France. They were divide in three groups. The top three teams of each group qualified for the final round.

Romania (as host), Russia (as incumbent champion) and the Czech Republic (as incumbent runner-up) received a bye to the main tournament.

=== Group A ===
The games were played in Umag, Croatia, from April 20 to 24, 1999.

Pos	Team	Pld	W	L	PF	PA	PD	Pts	Qualification	(Poland)	(France)	(Croatia)	(Hungary)	(Ukraine)	(Latvia)
1	Poland	5	5	0	321	275	+46	10	Final Round	—	54–53	52–50	74–51	74–60	67–61
2	France	5	4	1	312	225	+87	9	Final Round		—	70–37	56–49	70–49	63–36
3	Croatia (H)	5	2	3	284	261	+23	7	Final Round			—	80–44	71–46	46–49
4	Hungary	5	2	3	267	324	−57	7					—	63–58	60–56
5	Ukraine	5	1	4	287	310	−23	6						—	74–32
6	Latvia	5	1	4	234	310	−76	6							—

Source: FIBA Archive
Rules for classification: 1) points; 2) head-to-head record.
(H) Hosts

=== Group B ===
The games were played in Völklingen, Germany, from April 7 to 11, 1999.

Pos	Team	Pld	W	L	PF	PA	PD	Pts	Qualification	(Slovakia)	(Federal Republic of Yugoslavia)	(Belarus)	(Germany)	(Italy)	(Bulgaria)
1	Slovakia	5	5	0	309	244	+65	10	Final Round	—	55–46	77–65	65–36	51–49	61–48
2	Yugoslavia	5	4	1	342	271	+71	9	Final Round		—	87–59	65–50	66–55	78–52
3	Belarus	5	3	2	323	343	−20	8	Final Round			—	62–56	79–71	58–52
4	Germany (H)	5	2	3	274	317	−43	7					—	62–58	70–67
5	Italy	5	1	4	294	307	−13	6						—	61–49
6	Bulgaria	5	0	5	268	328	−60	5							—

Source: FIBA Archive
Rules for classification: 1) points; 2) head-to-head record.
(H) Hosts

=== Group C ===
The games were played in Santander, Spain, from April 6 to 10, 1999.

Pos	Team	Pld	W	L	PF	PA	PD	Pts	Qualification	(Spain)	(Turkey)	(Greece)	(Sweden)	(Belgium)	(Austria)
1	Spain (H)	5	5	0	369	182	+187	10	Final Round	—	73–31	59–46	86–37	73–32	78–36
2	Turkey	5	4	1	239	238	+1	9	Final Round		—	65–55	41–40	57–43	45–27
3	Greece	5	3	2	324	231	+93	8	Final Round			—	78–31	69–41	76–35
4	Sweden	5	2	3	222	306	−84	7					—	58–51	56–50
5	Belgium	5	1	4	218	297	−79	6						—	51–40
6	Austria	5	0	5	188	306	−118	5							—

Source: FIBA Archive
Rules for classification: 1) points; 2) head-to-head record.
(H) Hosts

== Qualified teams ==
The following twelve teams qualified for the final tournament.

Team	Method of qualification	Finals appearance	Last appearance	Previous best performance
Romania	Hosts	9th	1997	Runners-up (1989)
Russia	1997 winners	4th	1995	Champions (1993, 1995, 1997)
Czech Republic	1997 runner-up	3rd	1997	Runners-up (1997)
Poland	Challenge Round Group A winners	9th	1997	5th (1976, 1978)
France	Challenge Round Group A runners-up	11th	1997	3rd (1997)
Croatia	Challenge Round Group A third place	3rd	1997	6th (1997)
Slovakia	Challenge Round Group B winners	3rd	1995	4th (1993)
Yugoslavia	Challenge Round Group B runners-up	11th	1997	Runners-up (1982, 1991)
Belarus	Challenge Round Group B third place	3rd	1997	4th (1997)
Spain	Challenge Round Group C winners	13th	1995	Runners-up (1993)
Turkey	Challenge Round Group C runners-up	1st (debut)	—	—
Greece	Challenge Round Group C third place	5th	1995	5th (1991)

== Main tournament ==
In the preliminary round, the twelve teams were allocated in two groups of six teams each. The top four teams of each group advanced to the quarterfinals. The last two teams of each group qualified for the 9th-12th playoffs.

=== Group round ===
==== Group A ====
Pos	Team	Pld	W	L	PF	PA	PD	Pts	Qualification	(Belarus)	(France)	(Poland)	(Slovakia)	(Turkey)	(Croatia)
1	Belarus	5	4	1	360	357	+3	9	Advance to quarterfinals	—	68–64	71–83	69–66	72–66	80–78
2	France	5	3	2	284	244	+40	8 (Note: Head-to-head records: FRA 1–1 (+5), POL 1–1 (0), SVK 1–1 (–5).)	Advance to quarterfinals		—	45–58	51–36	56–26	65–56
3	Poland	5	3	2	324	315	+9	8	Advance to quarterfinals			—	64–74	69–62	50–60
4	Slovakia	5	3	2	292	279	+13	8	Advance to quarterfinals				—	42–32	74–63
5	Turkey	5	1	4	251	281	−30	6	Transfer to 9th–12th playoff					—	65–42
6	Croatia	5	1	4	299	334	−35	6	Transfer to 9th–12th playoff						—

Source: FIBA Archive
Rules for classification: 1) points; 2) head-to-head record.

==== Group B ====
Pos	Team	Pld	W	L	PF	PA	PD	Pts	Qualification	(Federal Republic of Yugoslavia)	(Russia)	(Greece)	(Spain)	(Czech Republic)	(Romania)
1	Yugoslavia	5	4	1	287	297	−10	9	Advance to quarterfinals	—	84–82	45–43	37–65	54–52	67–55
2	Russia	5	4	1	336	306	+30	9	Advance to quarterfinals		—	61–54	57–55	56–52	80–61
3	Greece	5	3	2	285	283	+2	8	Advance to quarterfinals			—	49–46	64–62	75–69
4	Spain	5	3	2	314	226	+88	8	Advance to quarterfinals				—	42–32	74–63
5	Czech Republic	5	1	4	313	287	+26	6	Transfer to 9th–12th playoff					—	65–42
6	Romania	5	0	5	270	406	−136	5	Transfer to 9th–12th playoff						—

Source: FIBA Archive
Rules for classification: 1) points; 2) head-to-head record.

=== Playoffs ===
==== 9th-12th playoff ====
Semifinals
July 30
Romania	48
Turkey	57
July 30
Croatia	71
Czech Republic	62

9th place game
July 31
Turkey	56
Croatia	64
11th place game
July 31
Romania	51
Czech Republic	95

==== Championship playoff ====
Quarterfinals
July 30
Belarus	57
Spain	71
July 30
Poland	63
Russia	75
July 30
Slovakia	52
Yugoslavia	54
July 30
Greece	46
France	62

Semifinals
July 31
Spain	76
Russia	67
July 31
Yugoslavia	52
France	47

Final
August 1
Spain	66
Yugoslavia	58
Bronze game
August 1
France	57
Russia	50

===== 5th-8th playoff =====
Semifinals
July 31
Belarus	48
Poland	79
July 31
Slovakia	56
Greece	46

5th place game
August 1
Poland	54
Slovakia	66
7th place game
August 1
Belarus	56
Greece	60

== Final standings ==
Rank	Team
1st place, gold medalist(s)	Spain
2nd place, silver medalist(s)	Yugoslavia
3rd place, bronze medalist(s)	France
4th	Russia
5th	Slovakia
6th	Poland
7th	Greece
8th	Belarus
9th	Croatia
10th	Turkey
11th	Czech Republic
12th	Romania

1997 FIBA Europe Women's Under-16 Championship winners

Spain
1st title
