= Serbia women's national under-16 and under-17 basketball team =

Serbia
- FIBA zone: FIBA Europe
- National federation: Basketball Federation of Serbia

U17 World Cup
- Appearances: None

U16 EuroBasket
- Appearances: 22
- Medals: Gold: 1 (2003); Silver: 2 (1999, 2004)

U16 EuroBasket Division B
- Appearances: 3
- Medals: Gold: 2 (2013, 2022)

Serbia women's national under-16 and under-17 basketball team
Medal record

Women's basketball

Representing FR Yugoslavia / Serbia and Montenegro / Serbia

FIBA U16 Women's EuroBasket
Gold medal – first place	2003 Nevsehir	
Silver medal – second place	1999 Tulcea	
Silver medal – second place	2004 Torino	

The Serbia women's national under-16 and under-17 basketball team (Serbian: Женска кошаркашка репрезентација Србије до 16 и до 17 година / Ženska košarkaška reprezentacija Srbije do 16 i do 17 godina) is a national basketball team of Serbia, administered by the Basketball Federation of Serbia, the governing body for basketball in Serbia. It represents the country in under-16 and under-17 women's international basketball competitions.

== FIBA U16 Women's EuroBasket participations ==
Year	Division A
(Slovakia) 1993	did not participate
(Poland) 1995	did not participate
(Hungary) 1997	7th
(Romania) 1999	2nd place, silver medalist(s)
(Bulgaria) 2001	10th
(Turkey) 2003	1st place, gold medalist(s)
(Italy) 2004	2nd place, silver medalist(s)
(Poland) 2005	8th
(Slovakia) 2006	4th
(Latvia) 2007	4th
(Poland) 2008	14th
(Italy) 2009	11th
(Greece) 2010	4th
(Italy) 2011	13th
(Hungary) 2012	14th
(Bulgaria) 2013	(Division B)
(Hungary) 2014	11th
(Portugal) 2015	10th
(Italy) 2016	13th
(France) 2017	12th
(Lithuania) 2018	15th
(North Macedonia) 2019	(Division B)
(Portugal) 2022	(Division B)
(Turkey) 2023	7th
(Hungary) 2024	10th
(Romania) 2025	5th
(Romania) 2026	7th
Total	22/27

Year	Division B
(Portugal) 2013	1st place, gold medalist(s)
(Bulgaria) 2019	5th
(Montenegro) 2022	1st place, gold medalist(s)
Total	3/21

== FIBA U17 Women's Basketball World Cup participations ==
Year	Result
2010–2024	did not qualify
(Czech Republic) 2026	withdrawn
(Indonesia) 2028	to be determined
Total	0/8

== Previous squads ==
- 1999 European Championship — 2nd place
  Jelena Špirić, Andrea Stojanović, Biljana Pešović, Marina Mandić, Kristina Anđelković, Vanja Peričin, Maja Ranisavljev, Ivana Matović, Iva Perovanović, Milica Beljanski, Dara Kovačević, Jelena Radmilović. Head coach: Zoran Višić
- 2003 European Championship — 1st place
  Tamara Radočaj, Milena Petrović, Marina Ristić, Iva Prčić, Maja Milutinović, Adrijana Knežević, Jelena Dubljević, Zorica Mitov, Dunja Prčić, Vanja Ilić, Biljana Stjepanović, Miljana Bojović. Head coach: Željko Vukićević
- 2004 European Championship — 2nd place
  Sanja Marjanović, Sonja Petrović, Irena Matović, Jelena Tomašević, Nina Bogićević, Dragana Gobeljić, Maja Miljković, Jelena Milovanović, Jelena Cerina, Snežana Aleksić, Milica Jovanović, Smiljana Ivanović.
