= 1997 FIBA European Championship for Cadettes =

12th FIBA Under-16 Women's European Basketball Championship

Tournament details
- Host country: Hungary
- Dates: 18–27 July 1997
- Teams: 12
- Venue: (in 1 host city)

Final positions
- Champions: Russia (3rd title)

Tournament statistics
- Top scorer: (Spain) Fernández (21.3)
- Top rebounds: (Poland) Zytomirska (9.1)
- Top assists: (Belgium) Wambe (3.4)
- PPG (Team): Russia (72.6)
- RPG (Team): Poland (33.3)
- APG (Team): Russia; Spain (9.9)

The 1997 FIBA European Championship for Cadettes was the 12th edition of the European basketball championship for U16 women's teams, today known as FIBA U16 Women's European Championship. 12 teams featured in the competition, held in Sopron, Hungary, from 18 to 27 July 1997.

Russia won their third title in a row.

== Qualification ==
19 countries entered the qualification round. They were divided in three groups. The top three teams of each group qualified for the main tournament.

Hungary (as host), Russia (as incumbent champion) and Italy (as incumbent runner-up) received a bye to the main tournament and did not play in the qualification round.

=== Group A ===
The games were played in Gabrovo, Bulgaria, from August 12 to 16, 1996.

Pos	Team	Pld	W	L	PF	PA	PD	Pts	Qualification	(Federal Republic of Yugoslavia)	(Belgium)	(Poland)	(Bulgaria)	(Slovakia)	(Armenia)
1	Yugoslavia	5	5	0	299	242	+57	10	Final tournament	—	59–49	54–53	62–53	53–44	71–43
2	Belgium	5	3	2	330	295	+35	8	Final tournament		—	64–56	79–62	60–71	78–47
3	Poland	5	3	2	311	260	+51	8	Final tournament			—	82–50	59–53	61–39
4	Bulgaria (H)	5	2	3	331	350	−19	7					—	72–70	94–57
5	Slovakia	5	2	3	314	285	+29	7						—	76–41
6	Armenia	5	0	5	227	380	−153	5							—

Source: FIBA Archive
Rules for classification: 1) points; 2) head-to-head record.
(H) Hosts

=== Group B ===
The games were played in Žďár nad Sázavou, the Czech Republic, from August 18 to 24, 1996.

Pos	Team	Pld	W	L	PF	PA	PD	Pts	Qualification	(Czech Republic)	(Belarus)	(Croatia)	(Lithuania)	(Finland)	(Israel)	(Portugal)
1	Czech Republic (H)	6	6	0	442	275	+167	12	Final tournament	—	79–60	57–56	81–54	74–46	66–39	85–20
2	Belarus	6	5	1	465	347	+118	11	Final tournament		—	88–81	87–53	85–45	70–50	75–39
3	Croatia	6	3	3	416	326	+90	9	Final tournament			—	73–36	71–45	58–62	77–38
4	Lithuania	6	3	3	337	384	−47	9					—	55–40	70–59	69–44
5	Finland	6	2	4	305	404	−99	8						—	64–58	65–61
6	Israel	6	2	4	331	365	−34	8							—	63–37
7	Portugal	6	0	6	239	434	−195	6								—

Source: FIBA Archive
Rules for classification: 1) points; 2) head-to-head record.
(H) Hosts

=== Group C ===
The games were played in Timișoara, Romania, from August 13 to 17, 1996.

Pos	Team	Pld	W	L	PF	PA	PD	Pts	Qualification	(Spain)	(Romania)	(France)	(Greece)	(Germany)	(Turkey)
1	Spain	5	5	0	363	226	+137	10	Final tournament	—	91–54	66–44	53–47	62–37	91–44
2	Romania (H)	5	3	2	281	320	−39	8	Final tournament		—	65–61	45–41	54–77	63–50
3	France	5	3	2	268	249	+19	8	Final tournament			—	47–43	70–37	46–38
4	Greece	5	2	3	247	234	+13	7					—	48–35	68–54
5	Germany	5	2	3	256	292	−36	7						—	70–58
6	Turkey	5	0	5	244	338	−94	5							—

Source: FIBA Archive
Rules for classification: 1) points; 2) head-to-head record.
(H) Hosts

== Qualified teams ==
The following twelve teams qualified for the final tournament.

Team	Method of qualification	Finals appearance	Last appearance	Previous best performance
Hungary	Hosts	10th	1993	Runners-up (1976)
Russia	1995 winners	3rd	1995	Champions (1993, 1995)
Italy	1995 runner-up	12th	1995	Runners-up (1978, 1980, 1985, 1995)
Yugoslavia	Qualification round Group A winners	10th (Note: First appearance as the Federal Republic of Yugoslavia. They made nine more appearances as part of the Socialist Federal Republic of Yugoslavia. FIBA considers the Federal Republic of Yugoslavia as successor of the Socialist Federal Republic of Yugoslavia.)	1991	Runners-up (1982, 1991)
Belgium	Qualification round Group A runners-up	7th	1995	3rd (1995)
Poland	Qualification round Group A third place	8th	1995	5th (1976, 1978)
Czech Republic	Qualification round Group B winners	2nd	1995	8th (1995)
Belarus	Qualification round Group B runners-up	2nd	1995	5th (1995)
Croatia	Qualification round Group B third place	2nd	1993	12th (1993)
Spain	Qualification round Group C winners	12th	1995	Runners-up (1993)
Romania	Qualification round Group C runners-up	8th	1991	Runners-up (1989)
France	Qualification round Group C third place	10th	1993	6th (1987, 1993)

== Preliminary round ==
In the preliminary round, the twelve teams were allocated in two groups of six teams each. The top four teams of each group advanced to the quarter-finals. The last two teams of each group qualified for the 9th-12th playoffs.

=== Group A ===
Pos	Team	Pld	W	L	PF	PA	PD	Pts	Qualification	(Hungary)	(France)	(Croatia)	(Czech Republic)	(Italy)	(Romania)
1	Hungary	5	3	2	309	308	+1	8 (Note: The four teams were first ranked by their head-to-head records: HUN 2–1, FRA 2–1, CRO 1–2, CZE 1–2. Then, Hungary/France and Croatia/Czech Republic were ranked by their game result (HUN 58–57 FRA) / (CRO 59–57 CZE).)	Advance to quarter-finals	—	58–57	58–56	49–59	66–56	78–80
2	France	5	3	2	280	264	+16	8	Advance to quarter-finals		—	65–55	53–49	43–50	62–52
3	Croatia	5	3	2	303	284	+19	8	Advance to quarter-finals			—	59–57	69–53	64–51
4	Czech Republic	5	3	2	294	264	+30	8	Advance to quarter-finals				—	66–62	63–41
5	Italy	5	2	3	287	302	−15	7	Transfer to 9th–12th playoff					—	66–58
6	Romania	5	1	4	282	333	−51	6	Transfer to 9th–12th playoff						—

Source: FIBA Archive
Rules for classification: 1) points; 2) head-to-head record.

=== Group B ===
Pos	Team	Pld	W	L	PF	PA	PD	Pts	Qualification	(Spain)	(Russia)	(Federal Republic of Yugoslavia)	(Belarus)	(Poland)	(Belgium)
1	Spain	5	5	0	349	271	+78	10	Advance to quarter-finals	—	70–68	74–46	59–56	69–49	77–52
2	Russia	5	4	1	384	288	+96	9	Advance to quarter-finals		—	67–50	88–56	78–66	83–46
3	Yugoslavia	5	3	2	322	336	−14	8	Advance to quarter-finals			—	73–70	73–65	80–60
4	Belarus	5	2	3	343	343	0	7	Advance to quarter-finals				—	77–64	84–59
5	Poland	5	1	4	304	349	−45	6	Transfer to 9th–12th playoff					—	60–52
6	Belgium	5	0	5	269	384	−115	5	Transfer to 9th–12th playoff						—

Source: FIBA Archive
Rules for classification: 1) points; 2) head-to-head record.

== Playoffs ==
=== 9th-12th playoff ===
Semifinals
July 25
Italy	69
Belgium	75
July 25
Poland	81
Romania	76

9th place game
July 26
Belgium	62
Poland	79
11th place game
July 26
Italy	72
Romania	63

=== Championship playoff ===
Quarterfinals
July 25
Russia	67
Croatia	56
July 25
Hungary	71
Belarus	81
July 25
France	58
Yugoslavia	44
July 25
Spain	43
Czech Republic	49

Semifinals
July 26
Russia	61
Belarus	31
July 26
France	53
Czech Republic	67

Final
July 27
Russia	69
Czech Republic	60
Bronze game
July 27
France	66
Belarus	62

==== 5th-8th playoff ====
Semifinals
July 26
Croatia	75
Hungary	39
July 26
Yugoslavia	63
Spain	74

5th place game
July 27
Croatia	42
Spain	61
7th place game
July 27
Hungary	64
Yugoslavia	84

== Final standings ==
Rank	Team
1st place, gold medalist(s)	Russia
2nd place, silver medalist(s)	Czech Republic
3rd place, bronze medalist(s)	France
4th	Belarus
5th	Spain
6th	Croatia
7th	Yugoslavia
8th	Hungary
9th	Poland
10th	Belgium
11th	Italy
12th	Romania

1997 FIBA Europe Women's Under-16 Championship winners

Russia
3rd title

== Statistical leaders ==
Points

Name	PPG
(Spain) Marta Fernández	21.3
(Belgium) Laurence Van Malderen	18.4
(Poland) Dorota Kepa	18.4
(Federal Republic of Yugoslavia) Milka Bjelica	17.6
(Czech Republic) Eva Vítečková	17.1

Rebounds

Name	RPG
(Poland) Olga Zytomirska	9.1
(Federal Republic of Yugoslavia) Ivana Stojković	8.8
(Czech Republic) Eva Vítečková	8.8
(Belgium) Laurence Van Malderen	8.7
(Belarus) Oksana Chetko	8.4
(Belarus) Anna Statsenko	8.4

Assists

Name	APG
(Belgium) Kathy Wambe	3.4
(Spain) Marta Fernández	3.1
(Croatia) Dea Klein-Šumanovac	3.0
(Federal Republic of Yugoslavia) Brankica Hadžović	2.8
(Czech Republic) Markéta Bednářová	2.5
(Spain) Rosa Pérez	2.5
