= Zoran Višić =

Serbian basketball coach (born 1956)

Ivory Coast
- Position: Head coach

Personal information
- Born: 13 October 1956 (age 70) SR Serbia, SFR Yugoslavia

Career information
- Playing career: 1974–1982
- Coaching career: 1983–present

Career history

Coaching
- 1992–1994: Radnički Belgrade (assistant)
- 1994–1996: ŽKK Beopetrol
- 1996–1997: ŽKK Budućnost Podgorica
- 1997–1999: ŽKK Spartak
- 2001–2002: ICIM Arad
- 2002–2006: UMMC Ekaterinburg
- 2006: ŽKK Vojvodina
- 2006–2007: ŽKK Crvena zvezda
- 2008–2009: Mladost Zemun (men's)
- 2009–2010: ŽKK Hemofarm
- 2011–2012: ICIM Arad
- 2015–2016: Singapore Falcons (men's)
- 2016–2017: Chabibeh
- 2017–2021: India (women's)
- 2017–2019: India (men's)
- 2023–: Ivory Coast (women's)

Career highlights
- EuroLeague Women champion (2003)
Medals
Women's basketball
Head Coach for India
FIBA Women's Asia Cup Division B
Gold medal – first place	2017 India	Team
U16 Women's Asian Championship Division B
Gold medal – first place	2017 India	U16 Team
Head Coach for FR Yugoslavia
Europe U16 Championship for Women
Silver medal – second place	1999 Romania	U16 Team

Zoran Višić (Serbian Cyrillic: Зоран Вишић; born October 13, 1956) is a Serbian professional basketball coach. He is currently the head coach of the Ivory Coast women's national basketball team.

== Coaching career ==
=== Men's basketball ===
Višić coached the Mladost Zemun of the Serbian B League during 2008–09 season. He coached Singapore Pro-Am team Falcons during 2015–16 season.

=== Women's club basketball ===
Višić coached Beopetrol, Budućnost Podgorica and Spartak of the First Women's League of FR Yugoslavia. In 2001, he had signed for the Romanian team ICIM Arad where he stayed for one season.

Višić was a head coach of the Russian team UMMC Ekaterinburg from 2002 to 2006. He won EuroLeague Women and Russian Women's Premier League in 2002–03 season.

In 2006, he came back to Serbia and signed for the Vojvodina. In November 2006, he became the head coach for the Crvena zvezda. He lost the 2006–07 season Serbian League finals from Hemofarm. In November 2007, he got released as the head coach of the Zvezda. On July 17, 2009, he signed for the Hemofarm. He got fired in February 2010. In 2011, Višić became a head coach of ICIM Arad for his second time.

In October 2016, Višić was named a head coach of the Lebanese Women's First Division team Chabibeh. He left in May 2017.

=== National teams ===
==== Yugoslavia ====
Višić was an assistant coach of the FR Yugoslavia/Serbia and Montenegro women's national teams that participated at the EuroBasket Women 1995 and at the EuroBasket Women 2003. He was a head coach of the FR Yugoslavia women's national under-16 team that won silver medal at the 1999 FIBA Europe Under-16 Championship for Women.

==== India ====
On June 1, 2017, Višić was named as a head coach of the India women's national team. He won the gold medal at the 2017 FIBA Women's Asia Cup – Division B. He was a head coach of India women's national under-16 team that won the gold medal at the FIBA Under-16 Women's Asian Championship Division B.

In early November 2017, Višić was named as a head coach of the India men's national team.

== Career achievements and awards ==
- EuroLeague Women champion: 1 (with UMMC Ekaterinburg: 2002–03)
- Russian Women's Premier League champion: 1 (with UMMC Ekaterinburg: 2002–03)
- Russian Women's Cup winner: 1 (with UMMC Ekaterinburg: 2004–05)

== See also ==
- List of EuroLeague Women winning coaches
