= 2016 FIBA U16 Women's European Championship =

28th FIBA Under-16 Women's European Basketball Championship

Tournament details
- Host country: Italy
- Dates: 6–14 August 2016
- Teams: 16

Final positions
- Champions: Spain (10th title)

Tournament statistics
- MVP: (Germany) Luisa Geiselsöder

Official website
- www.fiba.basketball

The 2016 FIBA U16 Women's European Championship was the 28th edition of the Women's European basketball championship for national under-16 teams. Sixteen teams participated in the competition, held in Udine, Italy, from 6 to 14 August 2016.

Spain won their 10th championship title by beating Germany in the final, 64–48.

== Participating teams ==
- Belarus ▲ (Runners-up, 2015 FIBA Europe Under-16 Championship for Women Division B)
- Croatia
- Czech Republic
- France
- Germany
- Hungary
- Italy
- Latvia
- Lithuania ▲ (Winners, 2015 FIBA Europe Under-16 Championship for Women Division B)
- Portugal
- Russia
- Serbia
- Slovakia
- Spain
- Sweden ▲ (3rd place, 2015 FIBA Europe Under-16 Championship for Women Division B)
- Turkey

== Preliminary round ==
In this round, the 16 teams are allocated in four groups of four teams each. All teams advance to the playoff round of 16.

=== Group A ===
Pos	Team	Pld	W	L	PF	PA	PD	Pts
1	Germany	3	3	0	197	154	+43	6
2	Spain	3	2	1	165	127	+38	5
3	Hungary	3	1	2	168	179	−11	4
4	Portugal	3	0	3	127	197	−70	3

Source: FIBA

6 August 2016

Boxscore

Portugal	51–72	Germany

6 August 2016

Boxscore

Spain	59–46	Hungary

7 August 2016

Boxscore

Hungary	59–48	Portugal

7 August 2016

Boxscore

Germany	53–40	Spain

9 August 2016

Boxscore

Hungary	63–72	Germany

9 August 2016

Boxscore

Portugal	28–66	Spain

=== Group B ===
Pos	Team	Pld	W	L	PF	PA	PD	Pts
1	Italy	3	3	0	215	160	+55	6
2	Lithuania	3	2	1	232	215	+17	5
3	Russia	3	1	2	185	199	−14	4
4	Turkey	3	0	3	161	219	−58	3

Source: FIBA

6 August 2016

Boxscore

Turkey	60–77	Lithuania

6 August 2016

Boxscore

Russia	43–60	Italy

7 August 2016

Boxscore

Lithuania	85–75	Russia

7 August 2016

Boxscore

Italy	75–47	Turkey

9 August 2016

Boxscore

Turkey	54–67	Russia

9 August 2016

Boxscore

Italy	80–70	Lithuania

=== Group C ===
Pos	Team	Pld	W	L	PF	PA	PD	Pts
1	Czech Republic	3	3	0	215	154	+61	6
2	Belarus	3	2	1	199	209	−10	5
3	Latvia	3	1	2	171	180	−9	4
4	Serbia	3	0	3	198	240	−42	3

Source: FIBA

6 August 2016

Boxscore

Serbia	74–92	Belarus

6 August 2016

Boxscore

Czech Republic	58–45	Latvia

7 August 2016

Boxscore

Belarus	46–79	Czech Republic

7 August 2016

Boxscore

Latvia	70–61	Serbia

9 August 2016

Boxscore

Latvia	56–61	Belarus

9 August 2016

Boxscore

Serbia	63–78	Czech Republic

=== Group D ===
Pos	Team	Pld	W	L	PF	PA	PD	Pts
1	France	3	3	0	199	105	+94	6
2	Croatia	3	2	1	155	141	+14	5
3	Sweden	3	1	2	138	151	−13	4
4	Slovakia	3	0	3	96	191	−95	3

Source: FIBA

6 August 2016

Boxscore

France	51–44	Croatia

6 August 2016

Boxscore

Slovakia	27–56	Sweden

7 August 2016

Boxscore

Croatia	58–40	Slovakia

7 August 2016

Boxscore

Sweden	32–71	France

9 August 2016

Boxscore

Croatia	53–50	Sweden

9 August 2016

Boxscore

Slovakia	29–77	France

== Knockout stage ==
=== Bracket ===
Round of 16
10 Aug
Germany	63
Turkey	43
10 Aug
Belarus	62
Sweden	56
10 Aug
Lithuania	74
Hungary	72
10 Aug
France	85
Serbia	50
10 Aug
Spain	48
Russia	47
10 Aug
Czech Republic	65
Slovakia	47
10 Aug
Italy	60
Portugal	51
10 Aug
Croatia	53
Latvia	49

Quarter-finals
12 Aug
Germany	69
Belarus	53
12 Aug
Lithuania	36
France	76
12 Aug
Spain	63
Czech Republic	51
12 Aug
Italy	50
Croatia	45

Semi-finals
13 Aug
Germany	44
France	43
13 Aug
Spain	57
Italy	49

Final
14 Aug
Germany	48
Spain	64
Third place
14 Aug
France	68
Italy	50

=== 5th–8th place bracket ===
5th–8th place semifinals
13 Aug
Belarus	68
Lithuania	71
13 Aug
Czech Republic	41
Croatia	50

Fifth place
14 Aug
Lithuania	51
Croatia	54
Seventh place
14 Aug
Belarus	58
Czech Republic	84

=== 9th–16th place bracket ===
13th place game (14 Aug)
Serbia	77
Portugal	74
15th place game (14 Aug)
Sweden	73
Slovakia	49

13th-16th place semifinals (13 Aug)
Sweden	51
Serbia	79
Slovakia	51
Portugal	88

9th-16th place quarterfinals (12 Aug)
Turkey	66
Sweden	53
Hungary	68
Serbia	59
Russia	72
Slovakia	60
Portugal	32
Latvia	58

9th-12th place semifinals (13 Aug)
Turkey	63
Hungary	56
Russia	65
Latvia	68

9th place game (14 Aug)
Turkey	60
Latvia	56
11th place game (14 Aug)
Hungary	56
Russia	63

=== Final ===
14 August 2016
21:00

Boxscore

Germany	48–64	Spain
Scoring by quarter: 12–15, 15–17, 10–20, 11–12
Scoring by half: 27–32

Palasport Cus, Udine
Attendance: 600
Referees: Tolga Sahin (ITA), Özlem Yalman (TUR), Yury Ihnatsyeu (BLR)

== Final standings ==
Rank	Team	Record
1st place, gold medalist(s)	Spain	6–1
2nd place, silver medalist(s)	Germany	6–1
3rd place, bronze medalist(s)	France	6–1
4	Italy	5–2
5	Croatia	5–2
6	Lithuania	4–3
7	Czech Republic	5–2
8	Belarus	3–4
9	Turkey	3–4
10	Latvia	3–4
11	Russia	3–4
12	Hungary	2–5
13	Serbia	2–5
14	Portugal	1–6
15	Sweden	2–5
16	Slovakia	0–7

Relegated to the 2017 FIBA U16 Women's European Championship Division B
