= Russia women's national under-17 basketball team =

Youth basketball team representing Russia

Russia
- FIBA zone: FIBA Europe
- National federation: Russian Basketball Federation

U17 World Cup
- Appearances: 1
- Medals: None

U16 EuroBasket
- Appearances: 22
- Medals: Gold: 6 (1993, 1995, 1997, 2010, 2014, 2019); Silver: 1 (2001); Bronze: 2 (2004, 2012)
Home	Away

The Russia women's national under-16 and under-17 basketball team is a national basketball team of Russia, administered by the Russian Basketball Federation. It represents the country in international under-16 and under-17 women's basketball competitions.

After the 2022 Russian invasion of Ukraine, FIBA banned Russian teams and officials from participating in FIBA basketball competitions.

== FIBA U16 Women's EuroBasket record ==
Year	Pos.	Pld	W	L
(Slovakia) 1993	1st place, gold medalist(s)	7	7	0
(Poland) 1995	1st place, gold medalist(s)	7	7	0
(Hungary) 1997	1st place, gold medalist(s)	8	7	1
(Romania) 1999	4th	8	5	3
(Bulgaria) 2001	2nd place, silver medalist(s)	8	5	3
(Turkey) 2003	6th	8	3	5
(Italy) 2004	3rd place, bronze medalist(s)	8	6	2
(Poland) 2005	5th	8	7	1
(Slovakia) 2006	9th	8	6	2
(Latvia) 2007	6th	8	6	2
(Poland) 2008	9th	8	4	4
(Italy) 2009	4th	9	6	3
(Greece) 2010	1st place, gold medalist(s)	9	8	1
(Italy) 2011	6th	9	6	3
(Hungary) 2012	3rd place, bronze medalist(s)	9	8	1
(Bulgaria) 2013	6th	9	6	3
(Hungary) 2014	1st place, gold medalist(s)	9	9	0
(Portugal) 2015	8th	9	5	4
(Italy) 2016	11th	7	3	4
(France) 2017	7th	7	4	3
(Lithuania) 2018	6th	7	5	2
(North Macedonia) 2019	1st place, gold medalist(s)	7	7	0
2022 to 2026	Suspended			
Total	22/27	169	130	47

== FIBA U17 Women's World Cup record ==
Year	Pos.	Pld	W	L
(France) 2010	6th	8	3	5
(Netherlands) 2012	Did not qualify			
(Czech Republic) 2014	Did not qualify			
(Spain) 2016	Did not qualify			
(Belarus) 2018	Did not qualify			
(Romania) 2020	Did not qualify			
(Hungary) 2022	Suspended			
(Mexico) 2024	Suspended			
(Czech Republic) 2026	Suspended			
(Indonesia) 2028	To be determined			
Total	1/9	8	3	5

== See also ==
- Russia women's national basketball team
- Russia women's national under-19 basketball team
- Soviet Union women's national under-17 basketball team
