= 2012 FIBA Europe Under-16 Championship for Women =

2012 FIBA U16 Women's European Championship
24th FIBA Under-16 Women's European Basketball Championship

Tournament details
- Host country: Hungary
- Dates: 12–22 July 2012
- Teams: 16 (from 1 confederation)
- Venues: 2 (in 1 host city)

Final positions
- Champions: Spain (8th title)

Official website
- www.fibaeurope.com

The 2012 FIBA Europe Under-16 Championship for Women was the 24th edition of the FIBA Europe Under-16 Championship for Women. 16 teams participated in the competition, held in Miskolc, Hungary, from 12 to 22 July 2012. Spain won their eighth title.

== Participating teams ==
- Belgium
- Croatia
- Czech Republic
- England ▲ (Runners-up, 2011 FIBA Europe Under-16 Championship for Women Division B)
- France
- Germany ▲ (Winners, 2011 FIBA Europe Under-16 Championship for Women Division B)
- Greece
- Hungary
- Italy
- Netherlands
- Russia
- Serbia
- Slovakia
- Spain
- Sweden
- Turkey

== First round ==
In the first round, the teams were drawn into four groups of four. The first three teams from each group will advance to the second round (Groups E and F) and the last teams will advance to the 13th–16th place classification (Group G).

=== Group A ===
Pos	Team	Pld	W	L	PF	PA	PD	Pts	Qualification
1	Belgium	3	3	0	212	127	+85	6	Second round
2	Hungary	3	2	1	198	172	+26	5	Second round
3	Sweden	3	1	2	162	217	−55	4	Second round
4	Turkey	3	0	3	175	231	−56	3	13th–16th place classification

Source: FIBA Archive

=== Group B ===
Pos	Team	Pld	W	L	PF	PA	PD	Pts	Qualification
1	Russia	3	3	0	202	155	+47	6	Second round
2	Greece	3	1	2	147	149	−2	4	Second round
3	Slovakia	3	1	2	146	174	−28	4	Second round
4	Serbia	3	1	2	175	192	−17	4	13th–16th place classification

Source: FIBA Archive

=== Group C ===
Pos	Team	Pld	W	L	PF	PA	PD	Pts	Qualification
1	France	3	3	0	209	141	+68	6	Second round
2	Czech Republic	3	2	1	169	175	−6	5	Second round
3	Croatia	3	1	2	188	171	+17	4	Second round
4	England	3	0	3	130	209	−79	3	13th–16th place classification

Source: FIBA Archive

=== Group D ===
Pos	Team	Pld	W	L	PF	PA	PD	Pts	Qualification
1	Italy	3	2	1	187	135	+52	5	Second round
2	Netherlands	3	2	1	158	138	+20	5	Second round
3	Spain	3	2	1	168	159	+9	5	Second round
4	Germany	3	0	3	123	204	−81	3	13th–16th place classification

Source: FIBA Archive

== Second round ==
In the second round, the teams play in two groups of six. The first four teams from each group will advance to the Quarterfinals and the other teams will advance to the 9th–12th place playoffs.

=== Group E ===
Pos	Team	Pld	W	L	PF	PA	PD	Pts	Qualification
1	Russia	5	5	0	308	229	+79	10	Quarterfinals
2	Belgium	5	4	1	295	211	+84	9	Quarterfinals
3	Hungary	5	3	2	297	244	+53	8	Quarterfinals
4	Slovakia	5	2	3	237	281	−44	7	Quarterfinals
5	Greece	5	1	4	203	270	−67	6	9th–12th place playoffs
6	Sweden	5	0	5	226	331	−105	5	9th–12th place playoffs

Source: FIBA Archive

=== Group F ===
Pos	Team	Pld	W	L	PF	PA	PD	Pts	Qualification
1	Italy	5	4	1	302	234	+68	9	Quarterfinals
2	Spain	5	4	1	284	266	+18	9	Quarterfinals
3	France	5	3	2	293	255	+38	8	Quarterfinals
4	Czech Republic	5	2	3	276	314	−38	7	Quarterfinals
5	Croatia	5	1	4	279	309	−30	6	9th–12th place playoffs
6	Netherlands	5	1	4	244	300	−56	6	9th–12th place playoffs

Source: FIBA Archive

== 13th–16th place classification ==
=== Group G ===
Pos	Team	Pld	W	L	PF	PA	PD	Pts
13	Turkey	6	5	1	381	326	+55	11
14	Serbia	6	4	2	385	348	+37	10
15	Germany	6	3	3	354	321	+33	9
16	England	6	0	6	273	398	−125	6

Source: FIBA Archive

== 9th–12th place playoffs ==
9th–12th place semifinals
E5	Greece	56
F6	Netherlands	53
F5	Croatia	69
E6	Sweden	61

9th place match
E5	Greece	50
F5	Croatia	61
11th place match
F6	Netherlands	51
E6	Sweden	61

== Championship playoffs ==
Fifth place
E3	Czech Republic	52
F1	France	56
Seventh place
E1	Hungary	67
F3	Slovakia	42

Consolation semifinals
F4	Czech Republic	60
E3	Hungary	54
F3	France	79
E4	Slovakia	53

Quarterfinals
E1	Russia	63
F4	Czech Republic	30
F2	Spain	57
E3	Hungary	55
E2	Belgium	67
F3	France	60
F1	Italy	75
E4	Slovakia	36

Semifinals
E1	Russia	46
F2	Spain	51
F1	Belgium	50
E2	Italy	58

Final
F4	Spain	70
E4	Italy	49
Third place
F2	Russia	53
E2	Belgium	41

== Final standings ==
Rank	Team
1st place, gold medalist(s)	Spain
2nd place, silver medalist(s)	Italy
3rd place, bronze medalist(s)	Russia
4th	Belgium
5th	France
6th	Czech Republic
7th	Hungary
8th	Slovakia
9th	Croatia
10th	Greece
11th	Sweden
12th	Netherlands
13th	Turkey
14th	Serbia
15th	Germany
16th	England

2012 FIBA Europe Women's Under-16 Championship winners

Spain
8th title

Relegated to the 2013 FIBA Europe Under-16 Championship for Women Division B
