= Czech Republic women's national under-16 and under-17 basketball team =

Czech Republic
- FIBA zone: FIBA Europe
- National federation: Czech Basketball Federation
- Coach: Richard Fousek

U17 World Cup
- Appearances: 3
- Medals: None

U16 EuroBasket
- Appearances: 25
- Medals: Gold: 1 (2015); Silver: 5 (1997, 2006, 2013, 2014, 2018); Bronze: 1 (2007)

U16 EuroBasket Division B
- Appearances: 1
- Medals: Silver: 1 (2024)

The Czech Republic women's national under-16 and under-17 basketball team is a national basketball team of the Czech Republic, administered by the Czech Basketball Federation. It represents the country in international under-16 and under-17 women's basketball competitions.

== Tournament record ==
=== FIBA Under-17 World Cup ===
Year	Result
2014	4th
2016	5th
2026	14th

=== FIBA U16 EuroBasket ===
Year	Division A
1995	8th
1997	2nd place, silver medalist(s)
1999	11th
2001	4th
2003	7th
2004	6th
2005	7th
2006	2nd place, silver medalist(s)
2007	3rd place, bronze medalist(s)
2008	11th
2009	8th
2010	9th
2011	10th

Year	Division A	Division B
2012	6th	
2013	2nd place, silver medalist(s)	
2014	2nd place, silver medalist(s)	
2015	1st place, gold medalist(s)	
2016	7th	
2017	9th	
2018	2nd place, silver medalist(s)	
2019	7th	
2022	12th	
2023	14th	
2024		2nd place, silver medalist(s)
2025	13th	
2026	10th	

== See also ==
- Czech Republic women's national basketball team
- Czech Republic women's national under-19 basketball team
- Czech Republic men's national under-17 basketball team
