= Spain women's national under-16 and under-17 basketball team =

Spain
- FIBA zone: FIBA Europe
- National federation: FEB
- Coach: Isabel Fernández

U17 World Cup
- Appearances: 8
- Medals: Silver: 4 (2012, 2014, 2022, 2026); Bronze: 1 (2024)

U16 EuroBasket
- Appearances: 36
- Medals: Gold: 12 (1999, 2004, 2005, 2006, 2008, 2009, 2011, 2012, 2013, 2016, 2025, 2026); Silver: 4 (1993, 2007, 2022, 2023); Bronze: 4 (2014, 2018, 2019, 2024)
Home	Away
Medal record
Event	1st	2nd	3rd
U17 World Cup	0	4	1
U16 EuroBasket	12	4	4
Total	12	8	5

The Spain women's national under-16 and under-17 basketball team is a national basketball team of Spain, administered by the Spanish Basketball Federation. It represents the country in international under-16 and under-17 women's basketball competitions.

== Tournament record ==
=== U17 World Cup ===
Year	Pos.	Pld	W	L
(France) 2010	8th	8	2	6
(Netherlands) 2012	2nd place, silver medalist(s)	8	5	3
(Czech Republic) 2014	2nd place, silver medalist(s)	7	6	1
(Spain) 2016	6th	7	5	2
(Belarus) 2018	6th	7	3	4
(Hungary) 2022	2nd place, silver medalist(s)	7	6	1
(Mexico) 2024	3rd place, bronze medalist(s)	7	5	2
(Czech Republic) 2026	2nd place, silver medalist(s)	7	6	1
(Indonesia) 2028	To be determined			
Total	8/8	58	38	20

=== U16 EuroBasket ===
Year	Pos.	Pld	W	L
(Poland) 1976	10th	6	2	4
(Spain) 1978	11th	9	4	5
(Hungary) 1980	10th	8	1	7
(Finland) 1982	8th	7	2	5
(Italy) 1984	8th	7	2	5
(Socialist Federal Republic of Yugoslavia) 1985	9th	7	3	4
(Poland) 1987	9th	7	3	4
(Romania) 1989	4th	7	3	4
(Portugal) 1991	9th	7	2	5
(Slovakia) 1993	2nd place, silver medalist(s)	7	5	2
(Poland) 1995	4th	7	4	3
(Hungary) 1997	5th	8	7	1
(Romania) 1999	1st place, gold medalist(s)	8	6	2
(Bulgaria) 2001	7th	8	3	5
(Turkey) 2003	4th	8	6	2
(Italy) 2004	1st place, gold medalist(s)	8	8	0
(Poland) 2005	1st place, gold medalist(s)	8	7	1
(Slovakia) 2006	1st place, gold medalist(s)	8	8	0

Year	Pos.	Pld	W	L
(Latvia) 2007	2nd place, silver medalist(s)	8	6	2
(Poland) 2008	1st place, gold medalist(s)	8	8	0
(Italy) 2009	1st place, gold medalist(s)	9	7	2
(Greece) 2010	5th	9	6	3
(Italy) 2011	1st place, gold medalist(s)	9	9	0
(Hungary) 2012	1st place, gold medalist(s)	9	8	1
(Bulgaria) 2013	1st place, gold medalist(s)	9	9	0
(Hungary) 2014	3rd place, bronze medalist(s)	9	6	3
(Portugal) 2015	4th	9	5	4
(Italy) 2016	1st place, gold medalist(s)	7	6	1
(France) 2017	5th	7	6	1
(Lithuania) 2018	3rd place, bronze medalist(s)	7	6	1
(North Macedonia) 2019	3rd place, bronze medalist(s)	7	6	1
(Portugal) 2022	2nd place, silver medalist(s)	7	6	1
(Turkey) 2023	2nd place, silver medalist(s)	7	6	1
(Hungary) 2024	3rd place, bronze medalist(s)	7	6	1
(Romania) 2025	1st place, gold medalist(s)	7	7	0
(Romania) 2026	1st place, gold medalist(s)	7	7	0
Total	36/36	277	196	81

== See also ==
- Spain women's national basketball team
- Spain women's national under-20 basketball team
- Spain women's national under-18 basketball team
- Spain men's national under-17 basketball team
- Spain men's national under-16 basketball team
