= 2018 FIBA U16 Women's European Championship =

30th FIBA Under-16 Women's European Basketball Championship

Tournament details
- Host country: Lithuania
- Dates: 17–25 August
- Teams: 16
- Venues: 2 (in 1 host city)

Final positions
- Champions: Italy (1st title)

Tournament statistics
- MVP: (Italy) Caterina Gilli
- Top scorer: (Denmark) Rimdal (18.1)
- Top rebounds: (Lithuania) Visockaité (18.1)
- Top assists: (France) Farcy (5.6)
- PPG (Team): Spain (74.4)
- RPG (Team): Germany (56.9)
- APG (Team): Spain (22.9)

Official website
- www.fiba.basketball

The 2018 FIBA U16 Women's European Championship was the 30th edition of the Women's European basketball championship for national under-16 teams. It was held in Kaunas, Lithuania, from 17 to 25 August 2018. Italy won their first title in this age level after beating the Czech Republic in the final 60-52. It was Italy's first ever gold medal after six silver medals and seven bronze medals.

== Venues ==
| Kaunas | | 2018 FIBA U16 Women's European Championship is located in Lithuania |
| Kaunas Sports Hall | Aisciai Sport Hall | 2018 FIBA U16 Women's European Championship is located in Lithuania |
| Capacity: 5,000 | Capacity: 750 | 2018 FIBA U16 Women's European Championship is located in Lithuania |

== Participating teams ==
- Belgium ▲ (Runners-up, 2017 FIBA U16 Women's European Championship Division B)
- Croatia
- Czech Republic
- Denmark ▲ (Winners, 2017 FIBA U16 Women's European Championship Division B)
- France
- Germany
- Hungary
- Italy
- Latvia
- Lithuania (Hosts)
- Netherlands
- Poland
- Russia
- Serbia
- Spain
- Turkey

== First round ==
=== Group A ===
| Pos | Team | Pld | W | L | PF | PA | PD | Pts |
|---|---|---|---|---|---|---|---|---|
| 1 | Czech Republic | 3 | 3 | 0 | 173 | 152 | +21 | 6 |
| 2 | France | 3 | 2 | 1 | 192 | 146 | +46 | 5 |
| 3 | Turkey | 3 | 1 | 2 | 173 | 163 | +10 | 4 |
| 4 | Belgium | 3 | 0 | 3 | 116 | 193 | −77 | 3 |

Source: FIBA

=== Group B ===
| Pos | Team | Pld | W | L | PF | PA | PD | Pts |
|---|---|---|---|---|---|---|---|---|
| 1 | Spain | 3 | 3 | 0 | 253 | 160 | +93 | 6 |
| 2 | Latvia | 3 | 2 | 1 | 209 | 201 | +8 | 5 |
| 3 | Serbia | 3 | 1 | 2 | 148 | 202 | −54 | 4 |
| 4 | Netherlands | 3 | 0 | 3 | 153 | 200 | −47 | 3 |

Source: FIBA

=== Group C ===
| Pos | Team | Pld | W | L | PF | PA | PD | Pts |
|---|---|---|---|---|---|---|---|---|
| 1 | Italy | 3 | 3 | 0 | 227 | 116 | +111 | 6 |
| 2 | Hungary | 3 | 2 | 1 | 191 | 188 | +3 | 5 |
| 3 | Poland | 3 | 1 | 2 | 188 | 202 | −14 | 4 |
| 4 | Croatia | 3 | 0 | 3 | 144 | 244 | −100 | 3 |

Source: FIBA

=== Group D ===
| Pos | Team | Pld | W | L | PF | PA | PD | Pts |
|---|---|---|---|---|---|---|---|---|
| 1 | Russia | 3 | 3 | 0 | 189 | 150 | +39 | 6 |
| 2 | Germany | 3 | 2 | 1 | 156 | 141 | +15 | 5 |
| 3 | Lithuania | 3 | 1 | 2 | 171 | 182 | −11 | 4 |
| 4 | Denmark | 3 | 0 | 3 | 155 | 198 | −43 | 3 |

Source: FIBA

== Knockout stage ==
=== Bracket ===
Round of 16
21 August
Czech Republic | 64
Netherlands | 54
21 August
Hungary | 51
Lithuania | 37
21 August
Latvia | 59
Turkey | 74
21 August
Russia | 76
Croatia | 52
21 August
France | 77
Serbia | 33
21 August
Italy | 74
Denmark | 39
21 August
Spain | 72
Belgium | 36
21 August
Germany | 56
Poland | 73

Quarter-finals
22 August
Czech Republic | 51
Hungary | 48
22 August
Turkey | 58
Russia | 47
22 August
France | 59
Italy | 61
22 August
Spain | 72
Poland | 32

Semi-finals
24 August
Czech Republic | 48
Turkey | 37
24 August
Italy | 62
Spain | 60

Final
25 August
Czech Republic | 52
Italy | 60
3rd place game
25 August
Turkey | 47
Spain | 64

=== 5th place bracket ===
5th–8th place semifinals
24 August
Hungary | 52
Russia | 76
24 August
France | 70
Poland | 46

5th place game
25 August
Russia | 50
France | 73
7th place game
25 August
Hungary | 78
Poland | 59

=== 9th place bracket ===
9th–16th place quarterfinals
22 August
Netherlands | 59
Lithuania | 63
22 August
Latvia | 63
Croatia | 50
22 August
Serbia | 49
Denmark | 70
22 August
Belgium | 51
Germany | 57

9th–12th place semifinals
24 August
Lithuania | 41
Latvia | 56
24 August
Denmark | 45
Germany | 63

9th place game
25 August
Latvia | 49
Germany | 45
11th place game
25 August
Lithuania | 60
Denmark | 59

=== 13th place bracket ===
13th–16th place semifinals
24 August
Netherlands | 54
Croatia | 58
24 August
Serbia | 55
Belgium | 61

13th place game
25 August
Croatia | 46
Belgium | 64
15th place game
25 August
Netherlands | 65
Serbia | 79

== Final standings ==
| Rank | Team | Record |
|---|---|---|
| 1st place, gold medalist(s) | Italy | 7–0 |
| 2nd place, silver medalist(s) | Czech Republic | 6–1 |
| 3rd place, bronze medalist(s) | Spain | 6–1 |
| 4 | Turkey | 3–4 |
| 5 | France | 5–2 |
| 6 | Russia | 5–2 |
| 7 | Hungary | 4–3 |
| 8 | Poland | 2–5 |
| 9 | Latvia | 5–2 |
| 10 | Germany | 4–3 |
| 11 | Lithuania | 3–4 |
| 12 | Denmark | 1–6 |
| 13 | Belgium | 2–5 |
| 14 | Croatia | 1–6 |
| 15 | Serbia | 2–5 |
| 16 | Netherlands | 0–7 |

| Relegated to the 2019 FIBA U16 Women's European Championship Division B |

== All-Tournament Team ==
- (Italy) Caterina Gilli (MVP)
- (Czech Republic) Katerina Zeithammerova
- (Spain) Marta García
- (Spain) Mama Dembele
- (Turkey) Sude Yilmaz
