= 2024 FIBA U16 Women's EuroBasket =

International basketball competition

Tournament details
- Host country: Hungary
- City: Miskolc
- Dates: 16–24 August 2024
- Teams: 16 (from 1 confederation)
- Venues: 2 (in 1 host city)

Final positions
- Champions: Finland (1st title)
- Runners-up: France
- Third place: Spain
- Fourth place: Italy

Tournament statistics
- MVP: (France) Kathy-Emma Otto

Official website
- www.fiba.basketball

The 2024 FIBA U16 Women's EuroBasket was the 34th edition of the European basketball championship for women's national under-16 teams. The tournament was played in Miskolc, Hungary, from 16 to 24 August 2024.

== Participating teams ==
- Belgium
- Croatia
- Finland
- France
- Germany ▲ (Winners, 2023 FIBA U16 Women's European Championship Division B)
- Greece
- Hungary
- Israel
- Italy
- Latvia
- Montenegro ▲ (Runners-up, 2023 FIBA U16 Women's European Championship Division B)
- Poland
- Serbia
- Slovenia
- Spain
- Sweden ▲ (Third place, 2023 FIBA U16 Women's European Championship Division B)

== First round ==
The draw of the first round was held on 6 February 2024 in Freising, Germany.

In the first round, the teams were drawn into four groups of four. All teams advanced to the playoffs.

All times are local (Central European Summer Time – UTC+2).

=== Group A ===
Pos	Team	Pld	W	L	PF	PA	PD	Pts
1	Italy	3	2	1	171	150	+21	5
2	Germany	3	2	1	163	154	+9	5
3	Croatia	3	2	1	166	161	+5	5
4	Sweden	3	0	3	136	171	−35	3

Source: FIBA

16 August 2024
13:00

Boxscore

Sweden	42–53	Germany
Scoring by quarter: 5–12, 10–13, 12–18, 15–10
Pts: Holmgren 8 Rebs: Mansson 15; Asts: Mansson, Kero 3		Pts: Ivancic 15; Rebs: Schultze 12; Asts: Four players 2

DVTK Arena
Attendance: 50
Referees: Gvidas Gedvilas (LTU), Bogna Podkowinska (POL), Anna Belousova (LAT)

16 August 2024
15:30

Boxscore

Italy	58–49	Croatia
Scoring by quarter: 26–12, 6–11, 11–12, 15–14
Pts: Mohamud Mohamed Hassan, Zuccon 12; Rebs: Zuccon 14; Asts: Mosconi 4		Pts: Gazic 27; Rebs: Gazic 12; Asts: Stipic 5

DVTK Arena
Attendance: 100
Referees: Tomasz Wit Langowski (POL), Maria Ignatiou (CYP), László Goda (HUN)

17 August 2024
13:00

Boxscore

Germany	55–52 (OT)	Italy
Scoring by quarter: 11–13, 16–8, 11–16, 9–10, Overtime: 8–5
Pts: Ivancic 15; Rebs: Askamp 7 Asts: Schultze 4		Pts: Mohamud Mohamed Hassan 14; Rebs: Zuccon 11; Asts: Diagne 3

University of Miskolc Sports Hall
Attendance: 50
Referees: Zdravko Rutesic (MNE), Jelena Smiljanic (SRB), László Goda (HUN)

17 August 2024
20:30

Boxscore

Croatia	57–48	Sweden
Scoring by quarter: 15–12, 15–19, 14–6, 13–11
Pts: Zlatoper 17; Rebs: Gazic, Zlatoper 9 Asts: Zlatoper 3		Pts: Klintman 11; Rebs: Three players 5 Asts: Norberg 3

University of Miskolc Sports Hall
Attendance: 32
Referees: Elvis Binders-Coders (LAT), Sava Cetkovic (MNE), Gregor Oprčkal (SLO)

18 August 2024
15:30

Boxscore

Sweden	46–61	Italy
Scoring by quarter: 6–18, 11–12, 18–19, 11–12
Pts: Bajagilovic 10; Rebs: Chibuzor 6 Asts: Norberg 3		Pts: Mohamud Mohamed Hassan 18; Rebs: Mohamud Mohamed Hassan 10; Asts: Mosconi 3

DVTK Arena
Attendance: 50
Referees: Ivana Ivanovic (SRB), Sonia Teixeira (POR), Iyán Gonzalez Gálvez (ESP)

18 August 2024
18:00

Boxscore

Croatia	60–55	Germany
Scoring by quarter: 19–14, 21–16, 11–8, 9–17
Pts: Zlatoper 17; Rebs: Lovric 8 Asts: Tabak, Gazic 4		Pts: Ezeani 18; Rebs: Koletzki 7 Asts: Koletzki 5

University of Miskolc Sports Hall
Attendance: 30
Referees: Suzana Vujicic (MNE), Tomasz Wit Langowski (POL), Eirini Margarita Tsantali (GRE)

=== Group B ===
Pos	Team	Pld	W	L	PF	PA	PD	Pts
1	France	3	3	0	222	114	+108	6
2	Hungary	3	2	1	182	188	−6	5
3	Israel	3	1	2	175	193	−18	4
4	Greece	3	0	3	117	201	−84	3

Source: FIBA

16 August 2024
18:00

Boxscore

France	71–40	Hungary
Scoring by quarter: 19–13, 18–11, 20–8, 14–8
Pts: Leray 17; Rebs: Otto 9 Asts: Marcin 5		Pts: Three players 7 Rebs: Babay-Bognar, Babovic 6 Asts: Ocsenas 4

DVTK Arena
Attendance: 100
Referees: Ivana Ivanovic (SRB), Teo Miletić (CRO), Iyán Gonzalez Gálvez (ESP)

16 August 2024
20:30

Boxscore

Israel	63–38	Greece
Scoring by quarter: 13–5, 13–8, 19–12, 18–13
Pts: Zilbershlag 18; Rebs: Carmi 8 Asts: Sticlaru 4		Pts: Vigka 14; Rebs: Toumpaniari 11; Asts: Zormpala 3

DVTK Arena
Attendance: 100
Referees: Zdravko Rutesic (MNE), Jelena Tomic (CRO), Giacomo Dori (ITA)

17 August 2024
15:30

Boxscore

Greece	29–69	France
Scoring by quarter: 11–13, 4–17, 5–16, 9–23
Pts: Zormpala 6 Rebs: Tsianaka 5 Asts: Tsianaka 3		Pts: Otto 15; Rebs: Otto 12; Asts: Otto 3

University of Miskolc Sports Hall
Attendance: 37
Referees: Suzana Vujicic (MNE), Bogna Podkowinska (POL), Anna Belousova (LAT)

17 August 2024
18:00

Boxscore

Hungary	73–67 (OT)	Israel
Scoring by quarter: 15–18, 22–11, 10–11, 10–17, Overtime: 16–10
Pts: Three players 16; Rebs: Csaplar-Nagy 17; Asts: Ocsenas 6		Pts: Kanitz 30; Rebs: Zilbershlag 12; Asts: Kanitz, Yanay 3

DVTK Arena
Attendance: 100
Referees: Hrvoje Cavar (BIH), Sara Månsson (SWE), Tomasz Wit Langowski (POL)

18 August 2024
13:00

Boxscore

Israel	45–82	France
Scoring by quarter: 11–18, 10–21, 14–23, 10–20
Pts: Yanay 12; Rebs: Zilbershlag 8 Asts: Sticlaru 8		Pts: Leray 23; Rebs: Sevaux 10; Asts: Ravin 6

University of Miskolc Sports Hall
Attendance: 50
Referees: Elvis Binders-Coders (LAT), Teo Miletić (CRO), Marina Shalamberidze (GEO)

18 August 2024
18:00

Boxscore

Hungary	69–50	Greece
Scoring by quarter: 15–20, 23–14, 17–7, 14–9
Pts: Rigo 14; Rebs: Csaplar-Nagy 10; Asts: Rigo 5		Pts: Tsianaka 15; Rebs: Tsianaka 6 Asts: Zormpala 4

DVTK Arena
Attendance: 200
Referees: Jelena Smiljanic (SRB), Sava Cetkovic (MNE), Andrej Zlatevski (MKD)

=== Group C ===
Pos	Team	Pld	W	L	PF	PA	PD	Pts
1	Spain	3	3	0	245	162	+83	6
2	Latvia	3	2	1	187	175	+12	5
3	Serbia	3	1	2	154	210	−56	4
4	Poland	3	0	3	141	180	−39	3

Source: FIBA

16 August 2024
15:30

Boxscore

Spain	76–63	Latvia
Scoring by quarter: 20–11, 25–28, 12–15, 19–9
Pts: Llompart 18; Rebs: Nde 8 Asts: Toribio, Diaz 4		Pts: Plorina 18; Rebs: Skudra 7 Asts: Aploka, Luzgina 3

University of Miskolc Sports Hall
Attendance: 44
Referees: Suzana Vujicic (MNE), Sara Månsson (SWE), Gregor Oprčkal (SLO)

16 August 2024
18:00

Boxscore

Serbia	49–48	Poland
Scoring by quarter: 17–13, 7–22, 13–7, 12–6
Pts: Demirovic 11; Rebs: Demirovic 12; Asts: Radjenovic 3		Pts: Stepinska 17; Rebs: Maj 5 Asts: Maj 4

University of Miskolc Sports Hall
Attendance: 50
Referees: Petr Blahout (CZE), Sava Cetkovic (MNE), Marina Shalamberidze (GEO)

17 August 2024
13:00

Boxscore

Latvia	76–52	Serbia
Scoring by quarter: 20–11, 17–13, 21–11, 18–17
Pts: Luzgina 22; Rebs: Skudra 9 Asts: Plorina, Skrebele 4		Pts: Jovanov 16; Rebs: Ristic, Demirovic 8 Asts: Jovanov 3

DVTK Arena
Attendance: 20
Referees: Gvidas Gedvilas (LTU), Teo Miletić (CRO), Eirini Margarita Tsantali (GRE)

17 August 2024
20:30

Boxscore

Poland	46–83	Spain
Scoring by quarter: 10–24, 15–17, 10–23, 11–19
Pts: Agune 9 Rebs: Three players 5 Asts: Klobukowska 5		Pts: Okafor 15; Rebs: Three players 6 Asts: Three players 3

DVTK Arena
Attendance: 100
Referees: Jelena Tomic (CRO), Sonia Teixeira (POR), Andrej Zlatevski (MKD)

18 August 2024
15:30

Boxscore

Serbia	53–86	Spain
Scoring by quarter: 18–16, 8–23, 15–21, 12–26
Pts: Petkovic 14; Rebs: Ladinek 6 Asts: Radjenovic 4		Pts: Okafor 17; Rebs: Nde 7 Asts: Llompart 4

University of Miskolc Sports Hall
Attendance: 57
Referees: Zdravko Rutesic (MNE), Giacomo Dori (ITA), Maria Ignatiou (CYP)

18 August 2024
20:30

Boxscore

Latvia	48–47	Poland
Scoring by quarter: 13–9, 11–14, 8–7, 16–17
Pts: Plorina 15; Rebs: Plorina, Skudra 10; Asts: Three players 2		Pts: Danielewicz 10; Rebs: Danielewicz 10; Asts: Three players 2

University of Miskolc Sports Hall
Attendance: 60
Referees: Hrvoje Cavar (BIH), Petr Blahout (CZE), Gregor Oprčkal (SLO)

=== Group D ===
Pos	Team	Pld	W	L	PF	PA	PD	Pts
1	Finland	3	3	0	223	166	+57	6
2	Slovenia	3	2	1	190	169	+21	5
3	Belgium	3	1	2	207	177	+30	4
4	Montenegro	3	0	3	174	282	−108	3

Source: FIBA

16 August 2024
13:00

Boxscore

Montenegro	67–79	Slovenia
Scoring by quarter: 18–16, 16–12, 19–24, 14–27
Pts: Prascevic 25; Rebs: Vujovic 5 Asts: Kovacevic 5		Pts: Jazbec 19; Rebs: Modric 12; Asts: Modric 6

University of Miskolc Sports Hall
Attendance: 40
Referees: Jelena Smiljanic (SRB), Sonia Teixeira (POR), Hrvoje Cavar (BIH)

16 August 2024
20:30

Boxscore

Belgium	57–68	Finland
Scoring by quarter: 18–16, 17–16, 10–21, 12–15
Pts: Kibedi 19; Rebs: Lynch 10; Asts: Kibedi, Lynch 4		Pts: Schreck 14; Rebs: Nenonen 9 Asts: Pasanen 4

University of Miskolc Sports Hall
Attendance: 40
Referees: Elvis Binders-Coders (LAT), Andrej Zlatevski (MKD), Eirini Margarita Tsantali (GRE)

17 August 2024
15:30

Boxscore

Slovenia	56–44	Belgium
Scoring by quarter: 15–4, 11–17, 16–14, 14–9
Pts: Ocvirk 19; Rebs: Modric 11; Asts: Modric 4		Pts: Vanderstraeten 15; Rebs: Vilcinskas 12; Asts: Lynch 3

DVTK Arena
Attendance: 100
Referees: Petr Blahout (CZE), Giacomo Dori (ITA), Marina Shalamberidze (GEO)

17 August 2024
18:00

Boxscore

Finland	97–54	Montenegro
Scoring by quarter: 19–9, 22–11, 23–15, 33–19
Pts: Nikkila 15; Rebs: Nikkila 13; Asts: Nikkila 4		Pts: Vujovic 15; Rebs: Sekulovic 8 Asts: Kovacevic 4

University of Miskolc Sports Hall
Attendance: 30
Referees: Ivana Ivanovic (SRB), Iyán Gonzalez Gálvez (ESP), Maria Ignatiou (CYP)

18 August 2024
13:00

Boxscore

Finland	58–55	Slovenia
Scoring by quarter: 18–17, 10–11, 11–18, 19–9
Pts: Koskela 17; Rebs: Nikkila 12; Asts: Koskela 4		Pts: Modric 12; Rebs: Modric 9 Asts: Modric, Pozin 3

DVTK Arena
Attendance: 100
Referees: Jelena Tomic (CRO), Anna Belousova (LAT), László Goda (HUN)

18 August 2024
20:30

Boxscore

Montenegro	53–106	Belgium
Scoring by quarter: 15–30, 9–26, 19–25, 10–25
Pts: Vujovic 19; Rebs: Sekulovic 7 Asts: Prascevic 4		Pts: Kibedi 36; Rebs: Vilcinskas 10; Asts: Lynch 6

DVTK Arena
Attendance: 50
Referees: Gvidas Gedvilas (LTU), Bogna Podkowinska (POL), Sara Månsson (SWE)

== Playoff brackets ==
=== Main bracket ===
Round of 16
20 August
A1 Italy	81
B4 Greece	43
20 August
C2 Latvia	75
D3 Belgium	82
20 August
B2 Hungary	83
A3 Croatia	61
20 August
D1 Finland	53
C4 Poland	47
20 August
A2 Germany (OT)	91
B3 Israel	87
20 August
C1 Spain	105
D4 Montenegro	30
20 August
B1 France	78
A4 Sweden	24
20 August
D2 Slovenia	69
C3 Serbia	66

Quarterfinals
21 August
Italy	68
Belgium	62
21 August
Hungary	60
Finland	71
21 August
Germany	28
Spain	80
21 August
France	103
Slovenia	54

Semifinals
23 August
Italy	52
Finland	61
23 August
Spain	57
France	65

Final
24 August
Finland	49
France	47
3rd place match
24 August
Italy	38
Spain	80

=== 5th place bracket ===
5th–8th place semifinals
23 August
Belgium	78
Hungary	71
23 August
Germany	51
Slovenia	57

5th place match
24 August
Belgium	86
Slovenia	52
7th place match
24 August
Hungary	69
Germany	73

=== 9th place bracket ===
9th–16th place quarterfinals
21 August
Greece	70
Latvia	80
21 August
Croatia	65
Poland	81
21 August
Israel	81
Montenegro	74
21 August
Sweden	41
Serbia	62

9th–12th place semifinals
23 August
Latvia	74
Poland	59
23 August
Israel	72
Serbia	79

9th place match
24 August
Latvia	62
Serbia	56
11th place match
24 August
Poland	64
Israel	60

=== 13th place bracket ===
13th–16th place semifinals
23 August
Greece	58
Croatia	83
23 August
Montenegro	63
Sweden	62

13th place match
24 August
Croatia	59
Montenegro	56
15th place match
24 August
Greece	72
Sweden	66

== Playoff results ==
=== Round of 16 ===
20 August 2024
13:00

Boxscore

Italy	81–43	Greece
Scoring by quarter: 26–9, 17–10, 19–11, 19–13
Pts: Zanetti 14; Rebs: Zuccon, Zanetti 9 Asts: Mosconi, Sablich 5		Pts: Zormpala 9 Rebs: Chliaoutaki 5 Asts: Tsianaka 4

University of Miskolc Sports Hall
Attendance: 40
Referees: Suzana Vujicic (MNE), Petr Blahout (CZE), Gregor Oprčkal (SLO)

20 August 2024
13:00

Boxscore

France	78–24	Sweden
Scoring by quarter: 22–8, 16–6, 21–5, 19–5
Pts: Sevaux 13; Rebs: Greusard, Courbot 7 Asts: Marcin 4		Pts: Bajagilovic 6 Rebs: Andersson 6 Asts: Three players 2

DVTK Arena
Attendance: 10
Referees: Zdravko Rutesic (MNE), Jelena Tomic (CRO), Bogna Podkowinska (POL)

20 August 2024
15:30

Boxscore

Latvia	75–82	Belgium
Scoring by quarter: 18–24, 20–25, 25–14, 12–19
Pts: Miscenko 22; Rebs: Skudra 5 Asts: Luzgina 6		Pts: Kibedi 35; Rebs: Vilcinskas 14; Asts: Lynch 7

University of Miskolc Sports Hall
Attendance: 74
Referees: Jelena Smiljanic (SRB), Sava Cetkovic (MNE), László Goda (HUN)

20 August 2024
15:30

Boxscore

Slovenia	69–66	Serbia
Scoring by quarter: 18–21, 20–12, 8–14, 23–19
Pts: Ocvirk 28; Rebs: Modric 10; Asts: Modric 5		Pts: Radjenovic 17; Rebs: Demirovic 7 Asts: Radjenovic 8

DVTK Arena
Attendance: 100
Referees: Elvis Binders-Coders (LAT), Eirini Margarita Tsantali (GRE), Iyán Gonzalez Gálvez (ESP)

20 August 2024
18:00

Boxscore

Germany	91–87 (OT)	Israel
Scoring by quarter: 16–19, 19–14, 26–24, 19–23, Overtime: 11–7
Pts: Schultze 20; Rebs: Schultze 8 Asts: Koletzki 7		Pts: Zilbershlag 23; Rebs: Zilbershlag 6 Asts: Sticlaru 8

University of Miskolc Sports Hall
Attendance: 60
Referees: Hrvoje Cavar (BIH), Teo Miletić (CRO), Andrej Zlatevski (MKD)

20 August 2024
18:00

Boxscore

Hungary	83–61	Croatia
Scoring by quarter: 18–18, 22–10, 23–14, 20–19
Pts: Babay-Bognar, Kecsmarik 19; Rebs: Csaplar-Nagy 12; Asts: Ocsenas 8		Pts: Gazic 23; Rebs: Gazic 10; Asts: Tabak 3

DVTK Arena
Attendance: 200
Referees: Gvidas Gedvilas (LTU), Anna Belousova (LAT), Marina Shalamberidze (GEO)

20 August 2024
20:30

Boxscore

Spain	105–30	Montenegro
Scoring by quarter: 25–6, 31–10, 24–9, 25–5
Pts: Diaz 17; Rebs: Dike, Diaz 9 Asts: Three players 5		Pts: Vujovic 11; Rebs: Kovacevic 5 Asts: Dubljevic 2

University of Miskolc Sports Hall
Attendance: 45
Referees: Tomasz Wit Langowski (POL), Sonia Teixeira (POR), Maria Ignatiou (CYP)

20 August 2024
20:30

Boxscore

Finland	53–47	Poland
Scoring by quarter: 16–7, 16–17, 9–6, 12–17
Pts: Gardziella 13; Rebs: Nikkila 16; Asts: Koskela 6		Pts: Serednicka 18; Rebs: Danielewicz 13; Asts: Danielewicz 5

DVTK Arena
Attendance: 50
Referees: Ivana Ivanovic (SRB), Sara Månsson (SWE), Giacomo Dori (ITA)

=== 9th–16th place quarterfinals ===
21 August 2024
13:00

Boxscore

Greece	70–80	Latvia
Scoring by quarter: 17–20, 9–21, 18–19, 26–20
Pts: Zormpala 34; Rebs: Toumpaniari, Kampaka 8 Asts: Tsianaka 5		Pts: Aploka 17; Rebs: Aploka 7 Asts: Miscenko 6

University of Miskolc Sports Hall
Attendance: 40
Referees: Ivana Ivanovic (SRB), Iyán Gonzalez Gálvez (ESP), Andrej Zlatevski (MKD)

21 August 2024
15:30

Boxscore

Croatia	65–81	Poland
Scoring by quarter: 20–21, 11–27, 18–21, 16–12
Pts: Gazic 21; Rebs: Gazic 9 Asts: Tabak 6		Pts: Marczynska 21; Rebs: Danielewicz 9 Asts: Maj, Marczynska 4

University of Miskolc Sports Hall
Attendance: 26
Referees: Petr Blahout (CZE), Sonia Teixeira (POR), Sava Cetkovic (MNE)

21 August 2024
18:00

Boxscore

Israel	81–74	Montenegro
Scoring by quarter: 25–19, 17–21, 19–18, 20–16
Pts: Yanay 25; Rebs: Kanitz 8 Asts: Zilbershlag 5		Pts: Three players 15; Rebs: Sekulovic 10; Asts: Kovacevic 11

University of Miskolc Sports Hall
Attendance: 30
Referees: Elvis Binders-Coders (LAT), Giacomo Dori (ITA), Eirini Margarita Tsantali (GRE)

21 August 2024
20:30

Boxscore

Sweden	41–62	Serbia
Scoring by quarter: 10–24, 8–17, 11–8, 12–13
Pts: Klintman 9 Rebs: Mansson 9 Asts: Lemuna 3		Pts: Maksimovic 11; Rebs: Ladinek 11; Asts: Pavlovic 4

University of Miskolc Sports Hall
Attendance: 50
Referees: Gvidas Gedvilas (LTU), László Goda (HUN), Marina Shalamberidze (GEO)

=== 13th–16th place semifinals ===
23 August 2024
13:00

Boxscore

Greece	58–83	Croatia
Scoring by quarter: 12–32, 10–16, 16–15, 20–20
Pts: Toumpaniari 15; Rebs: Toumpaniari 13; Asts: Tsianaka 4		Pts: Gazic 24; Rebs: Gazic 10; Asts: Three players 5

University of Miskolc Sports Hall
Attendance: 44
Referees: Petr Blahout (CZE), Bogna Podkowinska (POL), Anna Belousova (LAT)

23 August 2024
15:30

Boxscore

Montenegro	63–62	Sweden
Scoring by quarter: 17–18, 13–15, 13–14, 20–15
Pts: Vujovic 20; Rebs: Sekulovic 10; Asts: Kovacevic 5		Pts: Mansson 14; Rebs: Kero 8 Asts: Norberg 3

University of Miskolc Sports Hall
Attendance: 24
Referees: Tomasz Wit Langowski (POL), Sonia Teixeira (POR), Gregor Oprčkal (SLO)

=== 15th place match ===
24 August 2024
10:30

Boxscore

Greece	72–66	Sweden
Scoring by quarter: 14–21, 20–9, 19–14, 19–22
Pts: Fousteri 12; Rebs: Chliaoutaki, Toumpaniari 10; Asts: Fousteri 8		Pts: Norberg 16; Rebs: Holmgren 5 Asts: Bajagilovic 5

University of Miskolc Sports Hall
Attendance: 25
Referees: Zdravko Rutesic (MNE), Giacomo Dori (ITA), Suzana Vujicic (MNE)

=== 13th place match ===
24 August 2024
15:30

Boxscore

Croatia	59–56	Montenegro
Scoring by quarter: 13–18, 14–11, 13–17, 19–10
Pts: Gazic 21; Rebs: Gazic 9 Asts: Tabak 4		Pts: Vujovic 19; Rebs: Sekulovic 12; Asts: Kovacevic 5

DVTK Arena
Attendance: 100
Referees: Elvis Binders-Coders (LAT), Tomasz Wit Langowski (POL), Iyán Gonzalez Gálvez (ESP)

=== 9th–12th place semifinals ===
23 August 2024
18:00

Boxscore

Latvia	74–59	Poland
Scoring by quarter: 15–22, 21–10, 20–10, 18–17
Pts: Skrebele 15; Rebs: Miscenko 7 Asts: Aploka, Skrebele 4		Pts: Danielewicz 17; Rebs: Danielewicz, Gryszko 5 Asts: Three players 2

University of Miskolc Sports Hall
Attendance: 60
Referees: Sava Cetkovic (MNE), Giacomo Dori (ITA), Marina Shalamberidze (GEO)

23 August 2024
20:30

Boxscore

Israel	72–79	Serbia
Scoring by quarter: 9–20, 20–21, 20–15, 23–23
Pts: Zilbershlag 32; Rebs: Zilbershlag 8 Asts: Sticlaru 5		Pts: Jovanov 22; Rebs: Ladinek 16; Asts: Jovanov 4

University of Miskolc Sports Hall
Attendance: 50
Referees: Iyán Gonzalez Gálvez (ESP), László Goda (HUN), Maria Ignatiou (CYP)

=== 11th place match ===
24 August 2024
13:00

Boxscore

Poland	64–60	Israel
Scoring by quarter: 16–11, 18–10, 17–21, 13–18
Pts: Danielewicz 15; Rebs: Danielewicz 14; Asts: Stepinska 4		Pts: Zilbershlag 26; Rebs: Zilbershlag 13; Asts: Zilbershlag 3

University of Miskolc Sports Hall
Attendance: 54
Referees: Ivana Ivanovic (SRB), Gregor Oprčkal (SLO), Marina Shalamberidze (GEO)

=== 9th place match ===
24 August 2024
15:30

Boxscore

Latvia	62–56	Serbia
Scoring by quarter: 19–12, 12–19, 14–17, 17–8
Pts: Luzgina 21; Rebs: Plorina 7 Asts: Luzgina 4		Pts: Jovanov 12; Rebs: Ladinek 14; Asts: Three players 2

University of Miskolc Sports Hall
Attendance: 40
Referees: Maria Ignatiou (CYP), Bogna Podkowinska (POL), Sara Månsson (SWE)

=== Championship quarterfinals ===
21 August 2024
13:00

Boxscore

France	103–54	Slovenia
Scoring by quarter: 31–10, 21–20, 24–12, 27–12
Pts: Broliron 19; Rebs: Otto, Sevaux 10; Asts: Ravin, Otto 4		Pts: Sivka 17; Rebs: Modric 8 Asts: Jancic 3

DVTK Arena
Attendance: 50
Referees: Tomasz Wit Langowski (POL), Teo Miletić (CRO), Bogna Podkowinska (POL)

21 August 2024
15:30

Boxscore

Germany	28–80	Spain
Scoring by quarter: 11–19, 1–19, 8–24, 8–18
Pts: Schultze 6 Rebs: Schultze 7 Asts: Koletzki 3		Pts: Diaz 17; Rebs: Lostal, Nde 7 Asts: Toribio 6

DVTK Arena
Attendance: 100
Referees: Jelena Smiljanic (SRB), Anna Belousova (LAT), Maria Ignatiou (CYP)

21 August 2024
18:00

Boxscore

Hungary	60–71	Finland
Scoring by quarter: 7–11, 19–18, 20–22, 14–20
Pts: Ocsenas 13; Rebs: Csaplar-Nagy 9 Asts: Ocsenas 3		Pts: Nenonen 19; Rebs: Nikkila 15; Asts: Koskela 7

DVTK Arena
Attendance: 200
Referees: Hrvoje Cavar (BIH), Jelena Tomic (CRO), Gregor Oprčkal (SLO)

21 August 2024
20:30

Boxscore

Italy	68–62	Belgium
Scoring by quarter: 21–20, 17–14, 17–11, 13–17
Pts: Mohamud Mohamed Hassan 23; Rebs: Zuccon 10; Asts: Mosconi 5		Pts: Proesman 14; Rebs: Vilcinskas 14; Asts: Three players 3

DVTK Arena
Attendance: 60
Referees: Zdravko Rutesic (MNE), Suzana Vujicic (MNE), Sara Månsson (SWE)

=== 5th–8th place semifinals ===
23 August 2024
13:00

Boxscore

Belgium	78–71	Hungary
Scoring by quarter: 18–24, 19–10, 15–15, 26–22
Pts: Vilcinskas 24; Rebs: Vilcinskas 22; Asts: Creemers 8		Pts: Ocsenas 18; Rebs: Ocsenas 8 Asts: Ocsenas 8

DVTK Arena
Attendance: 100
Referees: Ivana Ivanovic (SRB), Eirini Margarita Tsantali (GRE), Andrej Zlatevski (MKD)

23 August 2024
15:30

Boxscore

Germany	51–57	Slovenia
Scoring by quarter: 12–14, 11–8, 9–19, 19–16
Pts: Ezeani 16; Rebs: Schultze 8 Asts: Koletzki 3		Pts: Ocvirk 13; Rebs: Furlan 10; Asts: Ocvirk, Modric 4

DVTK Arena
Attendance: 100
Referees: Zdravko Rutesic (MNE), Jelena Tomic (CRO), Sara Månsson (SWE)

=== 7th place match ===
24 August 2024
18:00

Boxscore

Hungary	69–73	Germany
Scoring by quarter: 16–14, 12–18, 24–17, 17–24
Pts: Babay-Bognar 22; Rebs: Csaplar-Nagy 5 Asts: Ocsenas 7		Pts: Schultze 25; Rebs: Schultze 8 Asts: Koletzki 6

University of Miskolc Sports Hall
Attendance: 100
Referees: Teo Miletić (CRO), Eirini Margarita Tsantali (GRE), Andrej Zlatevski (MKD)

=== 5th place match ===
24 August 2024
13:00

Boxscore

Belgium	86–52	Slovenia
Scoring by quarter: 29–11, 13–16, 19–9, 25–16
Pts: Lynch 22; Rebs: Kibedi 11; Asts: Creemers 7		Pts: Ocvirk 11; Rebs: Modric 7 Asts: Ocvirk 3

DVTK Arena
Attendance: 100
Referees: Jelena Tomic (CRO), Sava Cetkovic (MNE), Anna Belousova (LAT)

=== Championship semifinals ===
23 August 2024
18:00

Boxscore

Italy	52–61	Finland
Scoring by quarter: 12–12, 19–15, 13–18, 8–16
Pts: Zanetti 16; Rebs: Zanetti 11; Asts: Diagne 5		Pts: Helasuo 12; Rebs: Koskela 7 Asts: Koskela 5

DVTK Arena
Attendance: 100
Referees: Jelena Smiljanic (SRB), Hrvoje Cavar (BIH), Teo Miletić (CRO)

23 August 2024
20:30

Boxscore

Spain	57–65	France
Scoring by quarter: 16–20, 11–17, 8–13, 22–15
Pts: Segura 15; Rebs: Martinez, Ezeanatogu 6 Asts: Llompart 7		Pts: Broliron 12; Rebs: Greusard 11; Asts: Broliron 6

DVTK Arena
Attendance: 100
Referees: Gvidas Gedvilas (LTU), Suzana Vujicic (MNE), Elvis Binders-Coders (LAT)

=== 3rd place match ===
24 August 2024
18:00

Boxscore

Italy	38–80	Spain
Scoring by quarter: 11–26, 13–16, 13–18, 1–20
Pts: Olandi 13; Rebs: Zanetti 8 Asts: Appetiti 4		Pts: Dike 16; Rebs: Ezeanatogu 9 Asts: Toribio 5

DVTK Arena
Attendance: 100
Referees: Gvidas Gedvilas (LTU), Sonia Teixeira (POR), László Goda (HUN)

=== Final ===
24 August 2024
20:30

Boxscore

Finland	49–47	France
Scoring by quarter: 18–11, 14–14, 13–16, 4–6
Pts: Nenonen 13; Rebs: Three players 6 Asts: Koskela 3		Pts: Otto 13; Rebs: Otto 10; Asts: Kolissoko, Broliron 3

DVTK Arena
Attendance: 500
Referees: Hrvoje Cavar (BIH), Jelena Smiljanic (SRB), Petr Blahout (CZE)

== Final standings ==
Rank	Team	Record
1st place, gold medalist(s)	Finland	7–0
2nd place, silver medalist(s)	France	6–1
3rd place, bronze medalist(s)	Spain	6–1
4	Italy	4–3
5	Belgium	4–3
6	Slovenia	4–3
7	Germany	4–3
8	Hungary	3–4
9	Latvia	5–2
10	Serbia	3–4
11	Poland	2–5
12	Israel	2–5
13	Croatia	4–3
14	Montenegro	1–6
15	Greece	1–6
16	Sweden	0–7

Relegated to the 2025 FIBA U16 Women's EuroBasket Division B
