= Belarus women's national under-17 basketball team =

Belarus
- FIBA zone: FIBA Europe
- National federation: Belarusian Basketball Federation

U17 World Cup
- Appearances: 1
- Medals: None

U16 EuroBasket
- Appearances: 13
- Medals: Silver: 1 (2003)

U16 EuroBasket Division B
- Appearances: 5
- Medals: Silver: 1 (2015)

The Belarus women's national under-16 and under-17 basketball team is a national basketball team of Belarus, administered by the Belarusian Basketball Federation. It represents the country in international under-16 and under-17 women's basketball competitions.

After the 2022 Russian invasion of Ukraine, the FIBA suspended Belarus from participating in basketball and 3x3 basketball competitions.

== FIBA U16 Women's EuroBasket participations ==
Year	Division A	Division B
1995	5th	
1997	4th	
1999	8th	
2003	2nd place, silver medalist(s)	
2004	4th	
2005	12th	
2006	7th	
2007	9th	
2008	10th	

Year	Division A	Division B
2009	14th	
2010	15th	
2012		12th
2013		8th
2015		2nd place, silver medalist(s)
2016	8th	
2017	15th	
2018		4th
2019		9th

== FIBA Under-17 Women's Basketball World Cup participations ==
Year	Result
2018	15th

== See also ==
- Belarus women's national basketball team
- Belarus women's national under-18 basketball team
- Belarus men's national under-16 basketball team
