= 2025 FIBA U16 Women's EuroBasket =

International youth basketball tournament

Tournament details
- Host country: Romania
- Cities: Pitești, Mioveni
- Dates: 15–23 August 2025
- Teams: 16 (from 1 confederation)
- Venues: 2 (in 2 host cities)

Final positions
- Champions: Spain (11th title)
- Runners-up: Slovenia
- Third place: Germany
- Fourth place: Latvia

Tournament statistics
- Games played: 56
- Attendance: 8,773 (157 per game)
- MVP: (Spain) Isabel Hernández
- Top scorer: (Romania) Ioana-Vanessa Velcea (143 Pts)

Official website
- www.fiba.basketball

The 2025 FIBA U16 Women's EuroBasket was the 35th edition of the European basketball championship for women's national under-16 teams. The tournament was played in Pitești and Mioveni, Romania, from 15 to 23 August 2025.

== Participating teams ==
- Belgium
- Croatia
- Czech Republic ▲ (Runners-up, 2024 FIBA U16 Women's EuroBasket Division B)
- Finland
- France
- Germany
- Great Britain ▲ (Third place, 2024 FIBA U16 Women's EuroBasket Division B)
- Hungary
- Israel
- Italy
- Latvia
- Poland
- Romania ▲ (Winners, 2024 FIBA U16 Women's EuroBasket Division B)
- Serbia
- Slovenia
- Spain

== Venues ==
The tournament is being held at two venues in Argeș County.

Mioveni	Pitești	2025 FIBA U16 Women's EuroBasket is located in Romania
Sala Sporturilor Mioveni	Pitești Arena	2025 FIBA U16 Women's EuroBasket is located in Romania
Capacity: 2,200	Capacity: 4,900	2025 FIBA U16 Women's EuroBasket is located in Romania

== Referees ==
The following 24 referees were selected for the tournament.

- Ruslan Khaligov (AZE)
- Haris Bijedić (BIH)
- Vladimir Zanev (BUL)
- Frane Mjeda (CRO)
- Jelena Tomić (CRO)
- Veronika Vávrová (CZE)
- Ivo Kitsing (EST)
- Jules Gaduel (FRA)
- Kirile Tvauri (GEO)
- Anastasia Tsakiraki (GRE)
- Eirini Tsantali (GRE)
- Viktor Nagy (HUN)
- Irene Frosolini (ITA)
- Elvis Binders-Čoders (LAT)
- Kristīne Simanoviča (LAT)
- Dumitru Stasiev (MDA)
- Nataša Dragojević (MNE)
- Bogna Podkowińska (POL)
- Amalia Marchiş (ROU)
- Ivana Ivanović (SRB)
- Nemanja Vlahović (SRB)
- Goran Grbić (SLO)
- Javier Torres (ESP)
- Duhan Köyiçi (TUR)

== First round ==
The draw of the first round was held on 28 January 2025 in Freising, Germany.

In the first round, the teams were drawn into four groups of four. All teams will advance to the playoffs.

All times are local (Eastern European Summer Time; UTC+3).

=== Group A ===
Pos	Team	Pld	W	L	PF	PA	PD	Pts
1	Spain	3	3	0	228	116	+112	6
2	Slovenia	3	2	1	160	185	−25	5
3	Latvia	3	1	2	214	187	+27	4
4	Great Britain	3	0	3	145	259	−114	3

Source: FIBA

15 August 2025
13:00

Boxscore

Great Britain	38–102	Spain
Scoring by quarter: 7–31, 10–26, 12–19, 9–26
Pts: Guttormsdóttir-Frost 10; Rebs: Rogers 10; Asts: Malek 2		Pts: Hernández 17; Rebs: Lostal 15; Asts: Hernández 6

Sala Sporturilor Mioveni
Attendance: 110
Referees: Haris Bijedić (BIH), Ivana Ivanović (SRB), Eirini Tsantali (GRE)

15 August 2025
20:30

Boxscore

Latvia	69–70	Slovenia
Scoring by quarter: 26–15, 15–15, 14–24, 14–16
Pts: Tikmere 16; Rebs: Sondore 15; Asts: Brokāne, Sirsniņa 3		Pts: Kisovec 18; Rebs: Ferjančič 9 Asts: Jerković 3

Sala Sporturilor Mioveni
Attendance: 76
Referees: Jelena Tomić (CRO), Viktor Nagy (HUN), Frane Mjeda (CRO)

16 August 2025
15:30

Boxscore

Slovenia	60–55	Great Britain
Scoring by quarter: 14–10, 15–22, 11–16, 20–7
Pts: Ferjančič 16; Rebs: Ferjančič 14; Asts: Gobec 5		Pts: Guttormsdóttir-Frost 25; Rebs: Malek, Guttormsdóttir-Frost 7 Asts: Malek, Guttormsdóttir-Frost 2

Pitești Arena
Attendance: 80
Referees: Kirile Tvauri (GEO), Duhan Köyiçi (TUR), Irene Frosolini (ITA)

16 August 2025
20:30

Boxscore

Spain	65–48	Latvia
Scoring by quarter: 18–10, 20–8, 16–17, 11–13
Pts: Hernández 15; Rebs: Lostal 8 Asts: Cherry 4		Pts: three players 8 Rebs: Krūmiņa 4 Asts: three players 2

Pitești Arena
Attendance: 87
Referees: Nemanja Vlahović (SRB), Bogna Podkowińska (POL), Dumitru Stasiev (MDA)

17 August 2025
15:30

Boxscore

Great Britain	52–97	Latvia
Scoring by quarter: 8–30, 15–25, 21–19, 8–23
Pts: Guttormsdóttir-Frost 17; Rebs: Rogers 7 Asts: Malek 3		Pts: Sondore 25; Rebs: Tikmere 11; Asts: Tikmere 5

Sala Sporturilor Mioveni
Attendance: 107
Referees: Amalia Marchiş (ROU), Veronika Vávrová (CZE), Vladimir Zanev (BUL)

17 August 2025
20:30

Boxscore

Slovenia	30–61	Spain
Scoring by quarter: 8–18, 6–12, 11–15, 5–16
Pts: Jerković 7 Rebs: Ferjančič 5 Asts: six players 1		Pts: Cherry 12; Rebs: Alonso 8 Asts: Hernández 4

Sala Sporturilor Mioveni
Attendance: 59
Referees: Jelena Tomić (CRO), Jules Gaduel (FRA), Ivo Kitsing (EST)

=== Group B ===
Pos	Team	Pld	W	L	PF	PA	PD	Pts
1	Poland	3	3	0	223	182	+41	6
2	Hungary	3	2	1	199	176	+23	5
3	Finland	3	1	2	181	203	−22	4
4	Czech Republic	3	0	3	173	215	−42	3

Source: FIBA

15 August 2025
15:30

Boxscore

Czech Republic	52–69	Finland
Scoring by quarter: 13–25, 20–15, 10–11, 9–18
Pts: Pencáková 15; Rebs: Nováková 10; Asts: Robson, Salaková 2		Pts: Riihelä 17; Rebs: Nanje 9 Asts: Riihijärvi 4

Sala Sporturilor Mioveni
Attendance: 100
Referees: Nataša Dragojević (MNE), Ivo Kitsing (EST), Ruslan Khaligov (AZE)

15 August 2025
18:00

Boxscore

Poland	64–61	Hungary
Scoring by quarter: 24–15, 13–14, 16–17, 11–15
Pts: Bowes 15; Rebs: Jasik 13; Asts: five players 2		Pts: Gálos 17; Rebs: Csaplár-Nagy 7 Asts: Dinnyés 6

Sala Sporturilor Mioveni
Attendance: 74
Referees: Nemanja Vlahović (SRB), Irene Frosolini (ITA), Dumitru Stasiev (MDA)

16 August 2025
13:00

Boxscore

Hungary	68–61	Czech Republic
Scoring by quarter: 19–17, 21–18, 16–8, 12–18
Pts: Halasy 16; Rebs: Oross 10; Asts: Halasy 5		Pts: Pencáková 21; Rebs: Nováková 10; Asts: Robson, Pencáková 4

Pitești Arena
Attendance: 100
Referees: Ivana Ivanović (SRB), Jules Gaduel (FRA), Vladimir Zanev (BUL)

16 August 2025
15:30

Boxscore

Finland	61–81	Poland
Scoring by quarter: 10–26, 10–19, 24–14, 17–22
Pts: Riihijärvi 13; Rebs: Mattila 6 Asts: Riihelä 3		Pts: Bowes 16; Rebs: Kenig 7 Asts: Olejniczak, Koryzna 3

Sala Sporturilor Mioveni
Attendance: 86
Referees: Javier Torres (ESP), Amalia Marchiş (ROU), Frane Mjeda (CRO)

17 August 2025
13:00

Boxscore

Czech Republic	60–78	Poland
Scoring by quarter: 15–26, 15–21, 15–19, 15–12
Pts: Přichystalová 10; Rebs: Bartošová, Sýkorová 8 Asts: Sýkorová 3		Pts: Wróbel 12; Rebs: Onuorah 10; Asts: Kenig 6

Pitești Arena
Attendance: 150
Referees: Goran Grbić (SLO), Nemanja Vlahović (SRB), Anastasia Tsakiraki (GRE)

17 August 2025
20:30

Boxscore

Hungary	70–51	Finland
Scoring by quarter: 12–20, 19–10, 16–14, 23–7
Pts: Csaplár-Nagy 16; Rebs: Csaplár-Nagy 9 Asts: Halasy 5		Pts: Riihijärvi 11; Rebs: Riihelä 10; Asts: Riihijärvi 3

Pitești Arena
Attendance: 100
Referees: Duhan Köyiçi (TUR), Elvis Binders-Čoders (LAT), Eirini Tsantali (GRE)

=== Group C ===
Pos	Team	Pld	W	L	PF	PA	PD	Pts
1	Serbia	3	3	0	260	196	+64	6
2	France	3	2	1	208	170	+38	5
3	Romania	3	1	2	179	191	−12	4
4	Belgium	3	0	3	165	255	−90	3

Source: FIBA

15 August 2025
18:00

Boxscore

Romania	42–60	France
Scoring by quarter: 17–20, 10–17, 9–12, 6–11
Pts: Mărcuș 11; Rebs: three players 4 Asts: Mărcuș 2		Pts: Foirest 14; Rebs: Konaté, Bissa 9 Asts: Unjanqui 4

Pitești Arena
Attendance: 557
Referees: Duhan Köyiçi (TUR), Goran Grbić (SLO), Bogna Podkowińska (POL)

15 August 2025
20:30

Boxscore

Serbia	100–66	Belgium
Scoring by quarter: 28–13, 26–27, 26–11, 20–15
Pts: Petrović 21; Rebs: Avramovic 10; Asts: Mazić 4		Pts: Depauw 15; Rebs: Belche 7 Asts: Mol 6

Pitești Arena
Attendance: 138
Referees: Elvis Binders-Čoders (LAT), Vladimir Zanev (BUL), Kristīne Simanoviča (LAT)

16 August 2025
18:00

Boxscore

Belgium	49–71	Romania
Scoring by quarter: 18–23, 11–17, 6–13, 14–18
Pts: Jans 9 Rebs: Belche 10; Asts: three players 2		Pts: Babadac 21; Rebs: Mărcuș 9 Asts: three players 4

Pitești Arena
Attendance: 495
Referees: Haris Bijedić (BIH), Jelena Tomić (CRO), Ruslan Khaligov (AZE)

16 August 2025
18:00

Boxscore

France	64–78	Serbia
Scoring by quarter: 11–21, 19–16, 18–17, 16–24
Pts: Sevaux 17; Rebs: Sevaux 11; Asts: Yombo-Gboto 3		Pts: Jovanov 12; Rebs: Avramović 15; Asts: Jovanov 6

Sala Sporturilor Mioveni
Attendance: 148
Referees: Viktor Nagy (HUN), Veronika Vávrová (CZE), Anastasia Tsakiraki (GRE)

17 August 2025
13:00

Boxscore

Belgium	50–84	France
Scoring by quarter: 2–25, 22–17, 13–17, 13–25
Pts: Keppenne 19; Rebs: Depauw 8 Asts: Belche 3		Pts: Foirest 18; Rebs: Sevaux 12; Asts: Bissa 4

Sala Sporturilor Mioveni
Attendance: 83
Referees: Javier Torres (ESP), Irene Frosolini (ITA), Frane Mjeda (CRO)

17 August 2025
18:00

Boxscore

Romania	66–82	Serbia
Scoring by quarter: 8–15, 24–14, 24–22, 10–31
Pts: Velcea 25; Rebs: Dan 9 Asts: Dan 3		Pts: Jovanov 22; Rebs: Maksimović 10; Asts: Petrović 4

Pitești Arena
Attendance: 350
Referees: Nataša Dragojević (MNE), Kirile Tvauri (GEO), Kristīne Simanoviča (LAT)

=== Group D ===
Pos	Team	Pld	W	L	PF	PA	PD	Pts
1	Italy	3	3	0	198	152	+46	6
2	Germany	3	2	1	238	167	+71	5
3	Croatia	3	1	2	173	217	−44	4
4	Israel	3	0	3	185	258	−73	3

Source: FIBA

15 August 2025
13:00

Boxscore

Israel	51–77	Italy
Scoring by quarter: 6–17, 20–23, 12–22, 13–15
Pts: Carmi 17; Rebs: Abudram 10; Asts: Gorin, Gadot 4		Pts: Hassan 11; Rebs: Hassan 16; Asts: Hassan 6

Pitești Arena
Attendance: 100
Referees: Amalia Marchiş (ROU), Veronika Vávrová (CZE), Jules Gaduel (FRA)

15 August 2025
15:30

Boxscore

Germany	89–40	Croatia
Scoring by quarter: 24–8, 21–9, 22–14, 22–9
Pts: Koch 19; Rebs: Askamp 9 Asts: three players 3		Pts: Bilušić 15; Rebs: Pavela 7 Asts: Pavela 2

Pitești Arena
Attendance: 100
Referees: Kirile Tvauri (GEO), Javier Torres (ESP), Anastasia Tsakiraki (GRE)

16 August 2025
13:00

Boxscore

Croatia	85–62	Israel
Scoring by quarter: 26–9, 24–22, 19–10, 16–21
Pts: Pilić 24; Rebs: Bilušić 12; Asts: Pavela, Pilić 5		Pts: Gorin 19; Rebs: Abudram 11; Asts: three players 3

Sala Sporturilor Mioveni
Attendance: 114
Referees: Elvis Binders-Čoders (LAT), Ivo Kitsing (EST), Eirini Tsantali (GRE)

16 August 2025
20:30

Boxscore

Italy	55–53	Germany
Scoring by quarter: 15–17, 12–17, 17–14, 11–5
Pts: Hassan 17; Rebs: Mueller 9 Asts: Diagne 6		Pts: Zraychenko 12; Rebs: Wiegand 10; Asts: Pfanzelt 3

Sala Sporturilor Mioveni
Attendance: 98
Referees: Goran Grbić (SLO), Nataša Dragojević (MNE), Kristīne Simanoviča (LAT)

17 August 2025
15:30

Boxscore

Israel	72–96	Germany
Scoring by quarter: 16–19, 19–24, 21–28, 16–25
Pts: Gorin 17; Rebs: Abudram 7 Asts: Gadot 4		Pts: Koch 23; Rebs: Gierlich 8 Asts: Wiegand 9

Pitești Arena
Attendance: 144
Referees: Ivana Ivanović (SRB), Bogna Podkowińska (POL), Ruslan Khaligov (AZE)

17 August 2025
18:00

Boxscore

Croatia	48–66	Italy
Scoring by quarter: 13–16, 11–11, 11–23, 13–16
Pts: Tabak 15; Rebs: Pilić 8 Asts: Tabak 5		Pts: Mueller 17; Rebs: Perego 13; Asts: Diagne 5

Sala Sporturilor Mioveni
Attendance: 86
Referees: Viktor Nagy (HUN), Haris Bijedić (BIH), Dumitru Stasiev (MDA)

== Playoff brackets ==
=== Main bracket ===
Round of 16
19 August
A1 Spain	80
B4 Czech Republic	29
19 August
C2 France	86
D3 Croatia	50
19 August
B2 Hungary	73
A3 Latvia	76
19 August
D1 Italy	95
C4 Belgium	73
19 August
A2 Slovenia	68
B3 Finland	53
19 August
C1 Serbia	79
D4 Israel	40
19 August
B1 Poland	88
A4 Great Britain	60
19 August
D2 Germany	87
C3 Romania	55

Quarterfinals
20 August
A1 Spain	72
C2 France	53
20 August
A3 Latvia	51
D1 Italy	47
20 August
A2 Slovenia	68
C1 Serbia	51
20 August
B1 Poland	54
D2 Germany	78

Semifinals
22 August
A1 Spain	81
A3 Latvia	24
22 August
A2 Slovenia	57
D2 Germany	41

Final
23 August
A1 Spain	62
A2 Slovenia	47
3rd place match
23 August
A3 Latvia	66
D2 Germany	71

=== 5th place bracket ===
5th–8th place semifinals
22 August
C2 France	63
D1 Italy	64
22 August
C1 Serbia	70
B1 Poland	56

5th place match
23 August
D1 Italy	66
C1 Serbia	70
7th place match
23 August
C2 France	64
B1 Poland	52

=== 9th place bracket ===
9th–16th place quarterfinals
20 August
B4 Czech Republic	75
D3 Croatia	79
20 August
B2 Hungary	75
C4 Belgium	62
20 August
B3 Finland	75
D4 Israel	84
20 August
A4 Great Britain	45
C3 Romania	74

9th–12th place semifinals
22 August
D3 Croatia	69
B2 Hungary (OT)	70
22 August
D4 Israel	72
C3 Romania	73

9th place match
23 August
B2 Hungary	59
C3 Romania	70
11th place match
23 August
D3 Croatia	61
D4 Israel	86

=== 13th place bracket ===
13th–16th place semifinals
22 August
B4 Czech Republic	74
C4 Belgium	66
22 August
B3 Finland	66
A4 Great Britain	74

13th place match
23 August
B4 Czech Republic	69
A4 Great Britain	60
15th place match
23 August
C4 Belgium	64
B3 Finland	60

== Playoff results ==
=== Round of 16 ===
19 August 2025
13:00

Boxscore

France	86–50	Croatia
Scoring by quarter: 17–13, 25–9, 23–13, 21–15
Pts: Sevaux 15; Rebs: Sevaux 13; Asts: David Essaga 6		Pts: Pilić 16; Rebs: three players 5 Asts: Tabak 5

Pitești Arena
Attendance: 50
Referees: Ivana Ivanović (SRB), Eirini Tsantali (GRE), Kristīne Simanoviča (LAT)

19 August 2025
13:00

Boxscore

Italy	95–73	Belgium
Scoring by quarter: 21–27, 20–16, 29–14, 25–16
Pts: Perego 22; Rebs: Hassan 7 Asts: Perego 7		Pts: Lecluse 18; Rebs: Belche 7 Asts: Bens 4

Sala Sporturilor Mioveni
Attendance: 78
Referees: Nataša Dragojević (MNE), Jules Gaduel (FRA), Anastasia Tsakiraki (GRE)

19 August 2025
15:30

Boxscore

Spain	80–29	Czech Republic
Scoring by quarter: 17–9, 26–3, 23–12, 14–5
Pts: Valenzuela 12; Rebs: Lishchuk, Abubakar 7 Asts: Cherry, Ballesté 5		Pts: Kotrčová 12; Rebs: Pencáková 5 Asts: eight players 1

Pitești Arena
Attendance: 200
Referees: Duhan Köyiçi (TUR), Amalia Marchiş (ROU), Dumitru Stasiev (MDA)

19 August 2025
15:30

Boxscore

Hungary	73–76	Latvia
Scoring by quarter: 14–20, 19–20, 18–16, 22–20
Pts: Dinnyés 18; Rebs: Csaplár-Nagy 7 Asts: Dinnyés 4		Pts: Skrebele 23; Rebs: Sondore 18; Asts: Skrebele 5

Sala Sporturilor Mioveni
Attendance: 117
Referees: Goran Grbić (SLO), Frane Mjeda (CRO), Bogna Podkowińska (POL)

19 August 2025
18:00

Boxscore

Slovenia	68–53	Finland
Scoring by quarter: 15–16, 22–8, 14–16, 17–13
Pts: Kržišnik 18; Rebs: Ferjančič 9 Asts: Jerković, Ferjančič 4		Pts: Riihijärvi 19; Rebs: Mattila 7 Asts: Riihelä 3

Sala Sporturilor Mioveni
Attendance: 100
Referees: Veronika Vávrová (CZE), Elvis Binders-Čoders (LAT), Irene Frosolini (ITA)

19 August 2025
18:00

Boxscore

Germany	87–55	Romania
Scoring by quarter: 15–12, 22–17, 25–15, 25–11
Pts: Wiegand 21; Rebs: Gierlich, Askamp 9 Asts: Askamp 4		Pts: Babadac 18; Rebs: Babadac, Mărcuș 6 Asts: Dan 3

Pitești Arena
Attendance: 517
Referees: Jelena Tomić (CRO), Nemanja Vlahović (SRB), Viktor Nagy (HUN)

19 August 2025
20:30

Boxscore

Poland	88–60	Great Britain
Scoring by quarter: 31–10, 12–17, 18–13, 27–20
Pts: Wróbel, Jasik 16; Rebs: Brzeska, Onuorah 8 Asts: Brzeska 6		Pts: Malek 18; Rebs: Malek 7 Asts: four players 1

Pitești Arena
Attendance: 76
Referees: Ivo Kitsing (EST), Haris Bijedić (BIH), Ruslan Khaligov (AZE)

19 August 2025
20:30

Boxscore

Serbia	79–40	Israel
Scoring by quarter: 29–7, 16–12, 14–5, 20–16
Pts: Petković 11; Rebs: Ilić 11; Asts: three players 4		Pts: Carmi 14; Rebs: Abudram 6 Asts: Carmi, Abd 2

Sala Sporturilor Mioveni
Attendance: 100
Referees: Javier Torres (ESP), Kirile Tvauri (GEO), Vladimir Zanev (BUL)

=== 9th–16th place quarterfinals ===
20 August 2025
13:00

Boxscore

Czech Republic	75–79	Croatia
Scoring by quarter: 14–36, 16–13, 27–6, 18–24
Pts: Pencáková 24; Rebs: Nováková 14; Asts: Robson, Kotrčová 4		Pts: three players 20; Rebs: Pilić 11; Asts: Tabak 14

Sala Sporturilor Mioveni
Attendance: 100
Referees: Vladimir Zanev (BUL), Goran Grbić (SLO), Anastasia Tsakiraki (GRE)

20 August 2025
15:30

Boxscore

Hungary	75–62	Belgium
Scoring by quarter: 19–6, 16–22, 21–17, 19–17
Pts: Csaplár-Nagy 22; Rebs: Székely, Csaplár-Nagy 9 Asts: Halasy 8		Pts: McCollum 12; Rebs: Belche 7 Asts: Bens 6

Sala Sporturilor Mioveni
Attendance: 50
Referees: Irene Frosolini (ITA), Ivana Ivanović (SRB), Dumitru Stasiev (MDA)

20 August 2025
18:00

Boxscore

Great Britain	45–74	Romania
Scoring by quarter: 18–20, 11–16, 6–18, 10–20
Pts: Malek 14; Rebs: Malek 7 Asts: Rugette 2		Pts: Velcea 28; Rebs: Tudor 16; Asts: Mărcuș 7

Sala Sporturilor Mioveni
Attendance: 286
Referees: Jules Gaduel (FRA), Veronika Vávrová (CZE), Haris Bijedić (BIH)

20 August 2025
20:30

Boxscore

Finland	75–84	Israel
Scoring by quarter: 10–24, 13–22, 29–12, 23–26
Pts: Riihelä 17; Rebs: Honkonen 13; Asts: Riihijärvi 5		Pts: Gorin 31; Rebs: Abudram 11; Asts: Gorin 7

Sala Sporturilor Mioveni
Attendance: 68
Referees: Eirini Tsantali (GRE), Bogna Podkowińska (POL), Frane Mjeda (CRO)

=== 13th–16th place semifinals ===
22 August 2025
13:00

Boxscore

Czech Republic	74–66	Belgium
Scoring by quarter: 19–10, 15–21, 16–18, 24–17
Pts: Bartošová 18; Rebs: Pencáková 13; Asts: Pencáková 5		Pts: Bens 23; Rebs: Mol 10; Asts: Bens, Belche 3

Sala Sporturilor Mioveni
Attendance: 83
Referees: Viktor Nagy (HUN), Amalia Marchiş (ROU), Nemanja Vlahović (SRB)

22 August 2025
15:30

Boxscore

Finland	66–74	Great Britain
Scoring by quarter: 14–16, 14–20, 24–25, 14–13
Pts: Riihijärvi 24; Rebs: Honkonen 14; Asts: Riihelä 5		Pts: Malek 18; Rebs: Rogers 12; Asts: Boniface 3

Sala Sporturilor Mioveni
Attendance: 75
Referees: Ivana Ivanović (SRB), Goran Grbić (SLO), Jules Gaduel (FRA)

=== 15th place match ===
23 August 2025
10:30

Boxscore

Belgium	64–60	Finland
Scoring by quarter: 9–14, 13–12, 15–16, 27–18
Pts: Nalli 15; Rebs: Mol 11; Asts: Keppenne 4		Pts: Honkonen 12; Rebs: Riihelä 8 Asts: Honkonen 4

Sala Sporturilor Mioveni
Attendance: 85
Referees: Vladimir Zanev (BUL), Kristīne Simanoviča (LAT), Javier Torres (ESP)

=== 13th place match ===
23 August 2025
13:00

Boxscore

Czech Republic	69–60	Great Britain
Scoring by quarter: 13–14, 18–14, 17–19, 21–13
Pts: Pencáková 22; Rebs: Bartošová 11; Asts: Robson 5		Pts: Guttormsdóttir-Frost 29; Rebs: Rogers 11; Asts: Rugette, Guttormsdóttir-Frost 2

Pitești Arena
Attendance: 109
Referees: Kirile Tvauri (GEO), Bogna Podkowińska (POL), Ruslan Khaligov (AZE)

=== 9th–12th place semifinals ===
22 August 2025
18:00

Boxscore

Israel	72–73	Romania
Scoring by quarter: 12–19, 15–15, 23–11, 22–28
Pts: Gorin 29; Rebs: Abudram 14; Asts: Carmi 4		Pts: Velcea 31; Rebs: Babadac 11; Asts: Velcea, Mărcuș 4

Sala Sporturilor Mioveni
Attendance: 323
Referees: Ivo Kitsing (EST), Anastasia Tsakiraki (GRE), Dumitru Stasiev (MDA)

22 August 2025
20:30

Boxscore

Croatia	69–70 (OT)	Hungary
Scoring by quarter: 14–13, 14–18, 20–15, 17–19, Overtime: 4–5
Pts: Tabak 21; Rebs: Pilić 12; Asts: Tabak 3		Pts: Csaplár-Nagy 19; Rebs: Csaplár-Nagy 13; Asts: Gálos 5

Sala Sporturilor Mioveni
Attendance: 50
Referees: Eirini Tsantali (GRE), Javier Torres (ESP), Kristīne Simanoviča (LAT)

=== 11th place match ===
23 August 2025
15:30

Boxscore

Croatia	61–86	Israel
Scoring by quarter: 15–30, 18–16, 19–17, 9–23
Pts: Pilić 17; Rebs: Pilić 11; Asts: Tabak 8		Pts: Gorin 24; Rebs: Abudram 20; Asts: Gadot 6

Sala Sporturilor Mioveni
Attendance: 50
Referees: Veronika Vávrová (CZE), Dumitru Stasiev (MDA), Jules Gaduel (FRA)

=== 9th place match ===
23 August 2025
18:00

Boxscore

Hungary	59–70	Romania
Scoring by quarter: 15–17, 14–16, 11–20, 19–17
Pts: Gálos, Horváth 10; Rebs: Gálos, Dinnyés 6 Asts: Halasy 5		Pts: Babadac 22; Rebs: Tudor 10; Asts: Velcea, Babadac 4

Sala Sporturilor Mioveni
Attendance: 156
Referees: Goran Grbić (SLO), Irene Frosolini (ITA), Frane Mjeda (CRO)

=== Championship quarterfinals ===
20 August 2025
13:00

Boxscore

Spain	72–53	France
Scoring by quarter: 19–9, 18–15, 27–14, 8–15
Pts: Hernández 19; Rebs: Lostal 6 Asts: Ballesté 4		Pts: David Essaga 18; Rebs: Bissa 8 Asts: three players 2

Pitești Arena
Attendance: 100
Referees: Nemanja Vlahović (SRB), Jelena Tomić (CRO), Ruslan Khaligov (AZE)

20 August 2025
15:30

Boxscore

Latvia	51–47	Italy
Scoring by quarter: 12–14, 20–12, 8–12, 11–9
Pts: Sondore 15; Rebs: Sondore 17; Asts: Brokāne, Skrebele 2		Pts: Mueller 13; Rebs: Nako Moni, Perego 9 Asts: Perego 3

Pitești Arena
Attendance: 72
Referees: Kirile Tvauri (GEO), Duhan Köyiçi (TUR), Viktor Nagy (HUN)

20 August 2025
18:00

Boxscore

Poland	54–78	Germany
Scoring by quarter: 15–21, 19–18, 10–23, 10–16
Pts: Koryzna, Kenig 10; Rebs: Jasik 9 Asts: Brzeska, Koryzna 3		Pts: Wiegand 20; Rebs: Pfanzelt 9 Asts: Pfanzelt, Gierlich 4

Pitești Arena
Attendance: 50
Referees: Elvis Binders-Čoders (LAT), Javier Torres (ESP), Kristīne Simanoviča (LAT)

20 August 2025
20:30

Boxscore

Slovenia	68–51	Serbia
Scoring by quarter: 18–15, 15–14, 15–8, 20–14
Pts: Požin 27; Rebs: Ferjančič 10; Asts: Jerković 7		Pts: Milošević 14; Rebs: Avramović 8 Asts: Jovanov 3

Pitești Arena
Attendance: 30
Referees: Amalia Marchiş (ROU), Nataša Dragojević (MNE), Ivo Kitsing (EST)

=== 5th–8th place semifinals ===
22 August 2025
13:00

Boxscore

France	63–64	Italy
Scoring by quarter: 16–12, 7–24, 24–13, 16–15
Pts: David Essaga 31; Rebs: Bissa 7 Asts: Ravin 4		Pts: Hassan 22; Rebs: Nako Moni 9 Asts: Salvetti 4

Pitești Arena
Attendance: 50
Referees: Elvis Binders-Čoders (LAT), Nataša Dragojević (MNE), Vladimir Zanev (BUL)

22 August 2025
15:30

Boxscore

Serbia	70–56	Poland
Scoring by quarter: 12–26, 23–9, 18–6, 17–15
Pts: Avramović 15; Rebs: Avramović 11; Asts: Mazić 6		Pts: Bowes 13; Rebs: Jasik 11; Asts: Olejniczak 3

Pitești Arena
Attendance: 87
Referees: Frane Mjeda (CRO), Haris Bijedić (BIH), Ruslan Khaligov (AZE)

=== 7th place match ===
23 August 2025
13:00

Boxscore

France	64–52	Poland
Scoring by quarter: 23–12, 19–13, 13–11, 9–16
Pts: David Essaga 19; Rebs: Bissa 7 Asts: David Essaga 6		Pts: Brzeska 16; Rebs: Onuorah 9 Asts: Białobrzewska 2

Sala Sporturilor Mioveni
Attendance: 65
Referees: Javier Torres (ESP), Anastasia Tsakiraki (GRE), Viktor Nagy (HUN)

=== 5th place match ===
23 August 2025
15:30

Boxscore

Italy	66–70	Serbia
Scoring by quarter: 11–9, 19–19, 22–21, 14–21
Pts: Hassan 22; Rebs: Hassan 9 Asts: Mueller 3		Pts: Jovanov 15; Rebs: Maksimović 10; Asts: Mazić 4

Pitești Arena
Attendance: 98
Referees: Jelena Tomić (CRO), Eirini Tsantali (GRE), Haris Bijedić (BIH)

=== Championship semifinals ===
22 August 2025
18:00

Boxscore

Spain	81–24	Latvia
Scoring by quarter: 22–9, 22–4, 13–4, 24–7
Pts: Alonso 15; Rebs: Ezeanatogu, Lostal 8 Asts: Hernández, Ballesté 5		Pts: Arāja 5 Rebs: Pētersone, Tikmere 4 Asts: Joma 2

Pitești Arena
Attendance: 90
Referees: Veronika Vávrová (CZE), Kirile Tvauri (GEO), Irene Frosolini (ITA)

22 August 2025
20:30

Boxscore

Slovenia	57–41	Germany
Scoring by quarter: 24–15, 3–16, 21–4, 9–6
Pts: Kisovec, Ferjančič 14; Rebs: Požin 10; Asts: Jerković, Ferjančič 3		Pts: Wiegand 16; Rebs: Zraychenko 7 Asts: Pfanzelt, Askamp 3

Pitești Arena
Attendance: 180
Referees: Jelena Tomić (CRO), Duhan Köyiçi (TUR), Bogna Podkowińska (POL)

=== 3rd place match ===
23 August 2025
18:00

Boxscore

Latvia	66–71	Germany
Scoring by quarter: 25–16, 17–14, 17–27, 7–14
Pts: Skrebele 22; Rebs: Sondore 13; Asts: three players 3		Pts: Wiegand 19; Rebs: Wiegand 11; Asts: Wiegand 2

Pitești Arena
Attendance: 163
Referees: Nataša Dragojević (MNE), Nemanja Vlahović (SRB), Ivo Kitsing (EST)

=== Final ===
23 August 2025
20:30

Boxscore

Spain	62–47	Slovenia
Scoring by quarter: 13–6, 17–16, 15–17, 17–8
Pts: Hernández 19; Rebs: Ezeanatogu 13; Asts: Ballesté 8		Pts: Ferjančič 12; Rebs: Požin 7 Asts: Kisovec 3

Pitești Arena
Attendance: 1,573
Referees: Amalia Marchiş (ROU), Ivana Ivanović (SRB), Elvis Binders-Čoders (LAT)

== Final standings ==
Rank	Team	Record
1st place, gold medalist(s)	Spain	7–0
2nd place, silver medalist(s)	Slovenia	5–2
3rd place, bronze medalist(s)	Germany	5–2
4	Latvia	3–4
5	Serbia	6–1
6	Italy	5–2
7	France	4–3
8	Poland	4–3
9	Romania	4–3
10	Hungary	4–3
11	Israel	2–5
12	Croatia	2–5
13	Czech Republic	2–5
14	Great Britain	1–6
15	Belgium	1–6
16	Finland	1–6

Qualified for the 2026 FIBA Under-17 Women's Basketball World Cup
Qualified for the 2026 FIBA Under-17 Women's Basketball World Cup as host nation
Relegated to the 2026 FIBA U16 Women's EuroBasket Division B

== Statistics and awards ==
=== Statistical leaders ===
==== Players ====
Points

Name	PPG
(Romania) Ioana-Vanessa Velcea	20.4
(Israel) Maayan Gorin	20.0
(United Kingdom) Ísey Guttormsdóttir-Frost	17.1
(Croatia) Iva Tabak	16.5
(Croatia) Ivona Pilić	16.3

Blocks

Name	BPG
(Serbia) Mia Avramović	2.3
(Slovenia) Veronika Ferjančič	1.9
(Italy) Susanna Perego	1.7
(Israel) Michal Abudram	1.6
(Romania) Ștefania Tudor	1.6

Rebounds

Name	RPG
(Israel) Michal Abudram	11.3
(Latvia) Sindija Sondore	10.7
(Serbia) Mia Avramović	8.9
(Croatia) Ivona Pilić	8.6
(Czech Republic) Ema Nováková	8.5

Steals

Name	SPG
(Hungary) Enikő Halasy	3.9
(Italy) Aisha Diagne	3.7
(Hungary) Petra Dinnyés	3.7
(Romania) Ioana-Vanessa Velcea	3.3
(United Kingdom) Mojan Malek	3.0

Assists

Name	APG
(Croatia) Iva Tabak	6.5
(Hungary) Enikő Halasy	4.6
(Spain) Ona Ballesté	4.0
(Hungary) Petra Dinnyés	3.9
(Spain) Isabel Hernández	3.7

Efficiency

Name	EFFPG
(Israel) Michal Abudram	16.7
(Italy) Isabel Hassan	16.6
(Latvia) Sindija Sondore	16.6
(Croatia) Ivona Pilić	16.3
(Germany) Mia Wiegand	16.0
(France) Lindiwe David Essaga	16.0

==== Teams ====
Points

Name	PPG
Serbia	75.7
Spain	74.7
Germany	73.6
Hungary	68.0
France	67.7

Blocks

Name	BPG
Germany	4.9
Serbia	4.7
Finland	3.9
Italy	3.9
Czech Republic	3.6

Rebounds

Name	RPG
Spain	55.1
Germany	47.6
Serbia	47.6
Czech Republic	46.9
France	45.4

Steals

Name	SPG
Spain	15.7
Hungary	14.9
Slovenia	14.1
Poland	13.7
Romania	13.1

Assists

Name	APG
Spain	17.9
Hungary	17.3
France	16.4
Serbia	16.4
Belgium	15.3

Efficiency

Name	EFFPG
Spain	95.1
Serbia	86.7
Germany	83.6
France	75.7
Italy	73.3

=== Awards ===
The awards were announced on 23 August 2025.

Award	Player
All-Tournament Team	(Spain) Isabel Hernández
All-Tournament Team	(Germany) Mia Wiegand
All-Tournament Team	(Latvia) Sindija Sondore
All-Tournament Team	(Slovenia) Veronika Ferjančič
All-Tournament Team	(Slovenia) Ota Požin
Most Valuable Player	(Spain) Isabel Hernández
