= Croatia women's national under-16 and under-17 basketball team =

Croatia
- FIBA zone: FIBA Europe
- National federation: Croatian Basketball Federation
- Coach: Tatjana Jacović

U17 World Cup
- Appearances: 1
- Medals: None

U16 EuroBasket
- Appearances: 22
- Medals: Silver: 1 (2010); Bronze: 2 (2001, 2022)

U16 EuroBasket Division B
- Appearances: 4
- Medals: Silver: 1 (2009); Bronze: 1 (2019)

The Croatia women's national under-16 and under-17 basketball team is a national basketball team of Croatia, administered by the Croatian Basketball Federation. It represents the country in international under-16 and under-17 women's basketball competitions.

== Championship participations ==
=== U17 World Cup ===
Year	Pos.	Pld	W	L
(France) 2010	Did not qualify			
(Netherlands) 2012	Did not qualify			
(Czech Republic) 2014	Did not qualify			
(Spain) 2016	Did not qualify			
(Belarus) 2018	Did not qualify			
(Hungary) 2022	Did not qualify			
(Mexico) 2024	9th	7	4	3
(Czech Republic) 2026	Did not qualify			
(Indonesia) 2028	To be determined			
Total	1/8	7	4	3

=== U16 EuroBasket ===
Year	Division A	Division B
1993	12th	
1997	6th	
1999	9th	
2001	3rd place, bronze medalist(s)	
2003	8th	
2004	9th	
2005	10th	
2006	16th	
2007		9th
2008		9th
2009		2nd place, silver medalist(s)
2010	2nd place, silver medalist(s)	
2011	14th	

Year	Division A	Division B
2012	9th	
2013	8th	
2014	10th	
2015	12th	
2016	5th	
2017	10th	
2018	14th	
2019		3rd place, bronze medalist(s)
2022	3rd place, bronze medalist(s)	
2023	5th	
2024	13th	
2025	12th	
2026	12th	

== See also ==
- Croatia women's national basketball team
- Croatia women's national under-18 basketball team
- Croatia men's national under-16 and under-17 basketball team
