= Latvia women's national under-17 basketball team =

Latvia
- FIBA zone: FIBA Europe
- National federation: Latvian Basketball Association
- Coach: Ilze Ose-Hlebovicka

U17 World Cup
- Appearances: 3

U16 EuroBasket
- Appearances: 16
- Medals: None

U16 EuroBasket Division B
- Appearances: 7
- Medals: Silver: 1 (2006); Bronze: 2 (2011, 2012)

The Latvia women's national under-16 and under-17 basketball team is a national basketball team of Latvia, administered by the Latvian Basketball Association. It represents the country in under-16 and under-17 women's international basketball competitions.

== Tournament record ==
=== U17 World Cup ===
Year	Pos.	Pld	W	L
(France) 2010	Did not qualify			
(Netherlands) 2012	Did not qualify			
(Czech Republic) 2014	Did not qualify			
(Spain) 2016	10th	6	2	4
(Belarus) 2018	8th	7	2	5
(Hungary) 2022	Did not qualify			
(Mexico) 2024	Did not qualify			
(Czech Republic) 2026	11th	7	3	4
(Indonesia) 2028	To be determined			
Total	3/8	20	7	13

=== FIBA U16 EuroBasket ===
Year	Division A	Division B
1993	11th	
2001	5th	
2004		7th/8th
2005		10th
2006		2nd place, silver medalist(s)
2007	7th	
2008	15th	
2009		5th
2010		9th
2011		3rd place, bronze medalist(s)
2012		3rd place, bronze medalist(s)
2013	7th	

Year	Division A
2014	5th
2015	5th
2016	10th
2017	4th
2018	9th
2019	8th
2022	9th
2023	11th
2024	9th
2025	4th
2026	4th

== See also ==
- Latvia women's national basketball team
- Latvia women's national under-19 basketball team
- Latvia men's national under-17 basketball team
