= Dea Klein-Šumanovac =

Croatian basketball player

Personal information
- Born: 17 May 1981 (age 45) Zagreb, SFR Yugoslavia
- Listed height: 1.80 m (5 ft 11 in)
- Listed weight: 72 kg (159 lb)

Career information
- WNBA draft: 2003: undrafted
- Playing career: –2009
- Position: Shooting guard

Career history
- Croatia Zagreb
- 2006–2009: Medveščak
Medals
Women's basketball
Representing Croatia
Mediterranean Games
| Silver medal – second place | 2005 Almería | Team |

Dea Klein-Šumanovac (born 17 May 1981 in Zagreb, SFR Yugoslavia) is a former Croatian female professional basketball player.
