= 1995 FIBA European Championship for Cadettes =

11th FIBA Under-16 Women's European Basketball Championship

Tournament details
- Host country: Poland
- Dates: 29 July – 6 August 1995
- Teams: 12
- Venue: (in 1 host city)

Final positions
- Champions: Russia (2nd title)

Tournament statistics
- Top scorer: (Germany) Fröhlich (22.1)
- Top rebounds: (Greece) Nikolaidu (11.1)
- Top assists: (Spain) Palau (4)
- PPG (Team): Russia (83.4)
- RPG (Team): Russia (41.4)
- APG (Team): Russia (13.7)

The 1995 FIBA European Championship for Cadettes was the 11th edition of the European basketball championship for U16 women's teams, today known as FIBA U16 Women's European Championship. 12 teams featured in the competition, held in Wladyslawowo, Poland, from 29 July to 6 August 1995.

Russia won their second title in a row in their second appearance after the dissolution of the Soviet Union in 1991.

== Qualification ==
For the first time since the inception of the tournament, a qualification round was played. Nineteen countries entered the qualification round. They were divide in three groups. The top three teams of each group qualified for the main tournament.

Poland (as host), Russia (as incumbent champion) and Spain (as incumbent runner-up) received a bye to the main tournament and did not play in the qualification round.

=== Group A ===
The games were played in Espoo, Finland, from August 10 to 14, 1994.

Pos	Team	Pld	W	L	PF	PA	PD	Pts	Qualification	(Belarus)	(Czech Republic)	(Germany)	(France)	(Finland)	(Lithuania)
1	Belarus	5	4	1	377	291	+86	9	Final tournament	—	86–63	49–61	70–41	84–50	88–76
2	Czech Republic	5	4	1	373	341	+32	9	Final tournament		—	63–47	76–64	95–77	76–67
3	Germany	5	3	2	300	301	−1	8	Final tournament			—	64–57	64–58	64–74
4	France	5	2	3	318	307	+11	7					—	81–39	75–58
5	Finland (H)	5	1	4	292	388	−96	6						—	68–64
6	Lithuania	5	1	4	339	371	−32	6							—

Source: FIBA Archive
Rules for classification: 1) points; 2) head-to-head record.
(H) Hosts

=== Group B ===
The games were played in Marsala, Italy, from August 8 to 14, 1994.

Pos	Team	Pld	W	L	PF	PA	PD	Pts	Qualification	(Italy)	(Belgium)	(Bulgaria)	(Turkey)	(Hungary)	(Ukraine)	(England)
1	Italy (H)	6	6	0	445	297	+148	12	Final tournament	—	63–45	57–55	74–67	61–59	79–61	111–10
2	Belgium	6	4	2	417	347	+70	10	Final tournament		—	83–69	51–63	63–54	72–59	103–39
3	Bulgaria	6	4	2	412	322	+90	10	Final tournament			—	73–62	58–54	64–46	93–20
4	Turkey	6	3	3	391	361	+30	9					—	54–53	64–73	81–37
5	Hungary	6	2	4	352	316	+36	8						—	56–51	76–29
6	Ukraine	6	2	4	394	365	+29	8							—	104–30
7	England	6	0	6	165	568	−403	6								—

Source: FIBA Archive
Rules for classification: 1) points; 2) head-to-head record.
(H) Hosts

=== Group C ===
The games were played in Žilina, Slovakia, from August 10 to 14, 1994.

Pos	Team	Pld	W	L	PF	PA	PD	Pts	Qualification	(Greece)	(Slovenia)	(Slovakia)	(Romania)	(Israel)	(Portugal)
1	Greece	5	4	1	297	227	+70	9 (Note: Head-to-head record: 1) GRE 1–1 (+17), SLO 1–1 (+7), SVK 1–1 (–24).)	Final tournament	—	69–42	49–61	61–49	59–43	62–37
2	Slovenia	5	4	1	312	276	+36	9	Final tournament		—	62–65	81–66	60–55	53–44
3	Slovakia (H)	5	4	1	323	292	+31	9	Final tournament			—	64–57	58–47	80–47
4	Romania	5	1	4	313	335	−22	6 (Note: Head-to-head record: 1) ROU 1–1 (+16), ISR 1–1 (0), POR 1–1 (–16).)					—	60–66	71–49
5	Israel	5	1	4	281	313	−32	6						—	70–76
6	Portugal	5	1	4	253	336	−83	6							—

Source: FIBA Archive
Rules for classification: 1) points; 2) head-to-head record.
(H) Hosts

== Qualified teams ==
The following twelve teams qualified for the final tournament.

Team	Method of qualification	Finals appearance	Last appearance	Previous best performance
Poland	Hosts	7th	1991	5th (1976, 1978)
Russia	1993 winners	2nd (Note: Second appearance as Russia. They made nine more appearances as part of the Soviet Union. FIBA considers the results of the Soviet Union (up to 1991) to be different from Russia.)	1993	Champions (1993)
Spain	1993 runner-up	11th	1993	Runners-up (1993)
Belarus	Qualification round Group A winners	1st (debut) (Note: First appearance as Belarus. They made nine more appearances as part of the Soviet Union. FIBA considers the results of the Soviet Union (up to 1991) to be different from Belarus.)	None	None
Czech Republic	Qualification round Group A runners-up	1st (debut) (Note: First appearance as the Czech Republic. They made five more appearances as part of Czechoslovakia. FIBA considers the results of Czechoslovakia (up to 1993) to be different from the Czech Republic.)	None	None
Germany	Qualification round Group A third place	1st (debut) (Note: First appearance as unified Germany. West Germany made seven more appearances.)	None	None
Italy	Qualification round Group B winners	11th	1993	Runners-up (1978, 1980, 1985)
Belgium	Qualification round Group B runners-up	6th	1993	8th (1993)
Bulgaria	Qualification round Group B third place	8th	1987	Runners-up (1984)
Greece	Qualification round Group C winners	4th	1993	5th (1991)
Slovenia	Qualification round Group C runners-up	1st (debut) (Note: First appearance as Slovenia. They made nine more appearances as part of Yugoslavia. FIBA considers the results of Yugoslavia (up to 1992) to be different from Slovenia.)	None	None
Slovakia	Qualification round Group C third place	2nd (Note: Second appearance as Slovakia. They made five more appearances as part of Czechoslovakia. FIBA considers the results of Czechoslovakia (up to 1993) to be different from Slovakia.)	1993	4th (1993)

== Preliminary round ==
In the preliminary round, the twelve teams were allocated in two groups of six teams each. The top two teams of each group advanced to the semifinals. The third and fourth place of each group qualified for the 5th-8th playoffs. The last two teams of each group qualified for the 9th-12th playoffs.

=== Group A ===
Pos	Team	Pld	W	L	PF	PA	PD	Pts	Qualification	(Italy)	(Belgium)	(Belarus)	(Bulgaria)	(Slovakia)	(Poland)
1	Italy	5	4	1	351	319	+32	9	Advance to Semifinals	—	65–57	72–83	70–68	80–60	64–51
2	Belgium	5	4	1	295	274	+21	9	Advance to Semifinals		—	51–44	65–54	65–57	57–54
3	Belarus	5	3	2	335	327	+8	8	Transfer to 5th–8th playoff			—	70–56	77–72	61–76
4	Bulgaria	5	2	3	302	310	−8	7	Transfer to 5th–8th playoff				—	68–51	56–54
5	Slovakia	5	1	4	307	351	−44	6	Transfer to 9th–12th playoff					—	67–61
6	Poland	5	1	4	296	305	−9	6	Transfer to 9th–12th playoff						—

Source: FIBA Archive
Rules for classification: 1) points; 2) head-to-head record.

=== Group B ===
Pos	Team	Pld	W	L	PF	PA	PD	Pts	Qualification	(Russia)	(Spain)	(Czech Republic)	(Greece)	(Germany)	(Slovenia)
1	Russia	5	5	0	387	282	+105	10	Advance to Semifinals	—	80–79	71–60	79–43	79–56	78–44
2	Spain	5	4	1	334	287	+47	9	Advance to Semifinals		—	70–54	58–56	65–60	62–37
3	Czech Republic	5	3	2	286	281	+5	8	Transfer to 5th–8th playoff			—	53–50	68–42	51–48
4	Greece	5	2	3	246	258	−12	7	Transfer to 5th–8th playoff				—	48–33	49–35
5	Germany	5	1	4	244	312	−68	6	Transfer to 9th–12th playoff					—	53–52
6	Slovenia	5	0	5	216	293	−77	5	Transfer to 9th–12th playoff						—

Source: FIBA Archive
Rules for classification: 1) points; 2) head-to-head record.

== Playoffs ==
=== 9th-12th playoff ===
Semifinals
August 5
Germany	72
Poland	65
August 5
Slovakia	64
Slovenia	60

9th place game
August 6
Germany	61
Slovakia	56
11th place game
August 6
Poland	65
Slovenia	59

=== 5th-8th playoff ===
Semifinals
August 5
Czech Republic	74
Bulgaria	76
August 5
Belarus	56
Greece	52

5th place game
August 6
Bulgaria	58
Belarus	72
7th place game
August 6
Czech Republic	68
Greece	69

=== Championship playoff ===
Semifinals
August 5
Russia	88
Belgium	62
August 5
Italy	78
Spain	72

Final
August 6
Russia	104
Italy	68
Bronze game
August 6
Belgium	75
Spain	70

== Final standings ==
Rank	Team
1st place, gold medalist(s)	Russia
2nd place, silver medalist(s)	Italy
3rd place, bronze medalist(s)	Belgium
4th	Spain
5th	Belarus
6th	Bulgaria
7th	Greece
8th	Czech Republic
9th	Germany
10th	Slovakia
11th	Poland
12th	Slovenia

1995 FIBA Europe Women's Under-16 Championship winners

Russia
2nd title

== Statistical leaders ==
Points

Name	PPG
(Germany) Linda Fröhlich	22.1
(Russia) Maria Stepanova	18.6
(Poland) Katarzyna Kenig	18.3
(Russia) Elena Karpova	17.0
(Russia) Svetlana Abrosimova	16.0
(Bulgaria) Gergana Slavcheva	16.0
(Czech Republic) Hana Horáková	16.0

Rebounds

Name	RPG
(Greece) Parthena Nikolaidou	11.1
(Germany) Linda Fröhlich	11.0
(Belgium) Dana Boonen	10.0
(Czech Republic) Ivana Večeřová	9.7
(Russia) Maria Stepanova	9.0

Assists

Name	APG
(Spain) Laia Palau	4.0
(Russia) Svetlana Abrosimova	3.0
(Poland) Malgorzata Czarnecka	2.7
(Russia) Maria Stepanova	2.7
(Slovakia) Slávka Bučáková	2.7
