= 1993 FIBA European Championship for Cadettes =

10th FIBA Under-16 Women's European Basketball Championship

Tournament details
- Host country: Slovakia
- Dates: 17–25 July 1993
- Teams: 12
- Venue: (in 1 host city)

Final positions
- Champions: Russia (1st title)

Tournament statistics
- Top scorer: (Russia) Petrova (19.4)
- PPG (Team): Russia (77.6)

The 1993 FIBA European Championship for Cadettes was the 10th edition of the European basketball championship for U16 women's teams, today known as FIBA U16 Women's European Championship. 12 teams featured in the competition, held in Poprad, Slovakia, from 17 to 25 July 1993.

Russia won their first title in their first appearance after the dissolution of the Soviet Union in 1991.

== Participating teams ==
- Belgium
- Croatia
- Finland
- France
- Greece
- Hungary
- Italy
- Latvia
- Lithuania
- Russia
- Slovakia
- Spain

== Preliminary round ==
In the preliminary round, the twelve teams were allocated in two groups of six teams each. The top two teams of each group advanced to the semifinals. The third and fourth place of each group qualified for the 5th-8th playoffs. The last two teams of each group qualified for the 9th-12th playoffs.

=== Group A ===
| Pos | Team | Pld | W | L | PF | PA | PD | Pts | Qualification | (Slovakia) | (Italy) | (Greece) | (Belgium) | (Croatia) | (Latvia) |
|---|---|---|---|---|---|---|---|---|---|---|---|---|---|---|---|
| 1 | Slovakia | 5 | 4 | 1 | 347 | 294 | +53 | 9 (Note: Head-to-head record: 1) SVK 1–1 (+7), ITA 1–1 (–3), GRE 1–1 (–4).) | Advance to Semifinals | — | 75–64 | 66–70 | 71–44 | 69–61 | 66–55 |
| 2 | Italy | 5 | 4 | 1 | 384 | 294 | +90 | 9 | Advance to Semifinals | | — | 66–58 | 81–52 | 91–49 | 82–60 |
| 3 | Greece | 5 | 4 | 1 | 307 | 283 | +24 | 9 | Transfer to 5th–8th playoff | | | — | 60–52 | 55–42 | 64–57 |
| 4 | Belgium | 5 | 2 | 3 | 254 | 315 | −61 | 7 | Transfer to 5th–8th playoff | | | | — | 51–50 | 55–53 |
| 5 | Croatia | 5 | 1 | 4 | 251 | 310 | −59 | 6 | Transfer to 9th–12th playoff | | | | | — | 49–44 |
| 6 | Latvia | 5 | 0 | 5 | 269 | 316 | −47 | 5 | Transfer to 9th–12th playoff | | | | | | — |

Source: FIBA Archive
Rules for classification: 1) points; 2) head-to-head record.

=== Group B ===
| Pos | Team | Pld | W | L | PF | PA | PD | Pts | Qualification | (Russia) | (Spain) | (Hungary) | (France) | (Finland) | (Lithuania) |
|---|---|---|---|---|---|---|---|---|---|---|---|---|---|---|---|
| 1 | Russia | 5 | 5 | 0 | 364 | 275 | +89 | 10 | Advance to Semifinals | — | 72–58 | 66–50 | 65–54 | 82–56 | 79–57 |
| 2 | Spain | 5 | 4 | 1 | 374 | 289 | +85 | 9 | Advance to Semifinals | | — | 67–60 | 79–62 | 91–49 | 79–46 |
| 3 | Hungary | 5 | 3 | 2 | 315 | 309 | +6 | 8 | Transfer to 5th–8th playoff | | | — | 66–56 | 70–59 | 69–61 |
| 4 | France | 5 | 2 | 3 | 319 | 327 | −8 | 7 | Transfer to 5th–8th playoff | | | | — | 66–60 | 81–57 |
| 5 | Finland | 5 | 1 | 4 | 292 | 367 | −75 | 6 | Transfer to 9th–12th playoff | | | | | — | 68–58 |
| 6 | Lithuania | 5 | 0 | 5 | 279 | 376 | −97 | 5 | Transfer to 9th–12th playoff | | | | | | — |

Source: FIBA Archive
Rules for classification: 1) points; 2) head-to-head record.

== Playoffs ==
=== 9th-12th playoff ===
Semifinals
July 24
Finland | 68
Latvia | 48
July 24
Croatia | 79
Lithuania | 98

9th place game
July 25
Finland | 56
Lithuania | 62
11th place game
July 25
Latvia | 83
Croatia | 51

=== 5th-8th playoff ===
Semifinals
July 24
Hungary | 71
Belgium | 57
July 24
Greece | 58
France | 66

5th place game
July 25
Hungary | 92
France | 72
7th place game
July 25
Belgium | 39
Greece | 84

=== Championship playoff ===
Semifinals
July 24
Russia | 113
Italy | 72
July 24
Slovakia | 49
Spain | 71

Final
July 25
Russia | 66
Spain | 65
Bronze game
July 25
Italy | 65
Slovakia | 60

== Final standings ==
| Rank | Team |
|---|---|
| 1st place, gold medalist(s) | Russia |
| 2nd place, silver medalist(s) | Spain |
| 3rd place, bronze medalist(s) | Italy |
| 4th | Slovakia |
| 5th | Hungary |
| 6th | France |
| 7th | Greece |
| 8th | Belgium |
| 9th | Lithuania |
| 10th | Finland |
| 11th | Latvia |
| 12th | Croatia |

1993 FIBA Europe Women's Under-16 Championship winners

Russia
1st title
