= 2012 FIBA Under-17 World Championship for Women =

Tournament details
- Host country: Netherlands
- City: Amsterdam
- Dates: 17–26 August
- Teams: 12 (from 5 confederations)
- Venue: 1 (in 1 host city)

Final positions
- Champions: United States (2nd title)

Tournament statistics
- MVP: (United States) Diamond DeShields
- Top scorer: (Belgium) Ben Abdelkader (19.4)
- Top rebounds: (Turkey) Coklar (11.9)
- Top assists: (United States) Allen (4.1)
- PPG (Team): United States (90.8)
- RPG (Team): United States (60.4)
- APG (Team): United States (17.0)

Official website
- Amsterdam2012.fiba.com/

The 2012 FIBA Under-17 World Championship for Women was an international basketball competition held in Amsterdam, Netherlands from August 17–26, 2012. It was the second edition of the Under-17 World Championships.

After their win last year, the United States successfully defended their title by defeating Spain 75–62 in the final.

== Qualification ==
12 teams were qualified for this edition.

- 2011 FIBA Africa Under-16 Championship for Women
  1. Mali
- 2011 FIBA Asia Under-16 Championship for Women
  1. Japan
  2. South Korea
- 2011 FIBA Americas Under-16 Championship for Women
  1. Brazil
  2. Canada
  3. United States
- 2011 FIBA Europe Under-16 Championship for Women
  1. Belgium
  2. Italy
  3. Spain
  4. Turkey
- 2011 FIBA Oceania Under-16 Championship for Women
  1. Australia
- Host country
  1. Netherlands

== Groups ==
Group A	Group B
Belgium; Canada; Italy; South Korea; Mali; United States	Australia; Brazil; Japan; Netherlands; Spain; Turkey

== Preliminary round ==
The draw was held on 10 February 2012 at Amsterdam, Netherlands.

All Times are local (UTC+2).

=== Group A ===
Advance to the quarterfinals
Relegated to 9th-12th place classification playoffs

Team	Pld	W	L	PF	PA	PD	Pts	Tiebreaker
United States	5	5	0	478	257	+221	10	
Italy	5	4	1	320	273	+47	9	
Canada	5	3	2	303	302	+1	8	
Belgium	5	2	3	311	287	+24	7	
South Korea	5	1	4	332	429	−97	6	
Mali	5	0	5	207	403	−196	5	

August 17
09:00

Report

Mali	45–81	Belgium
Scoring by quarter: 13–23, 8–24, 16–19, 8–15
Pts: Maiga 14; Rebs: Diallo 10; Asts: four players 1		Pts: Abdelkader 25; Rebs: Grzesinski 11; Asts: Nauerlaers, Abdelkader 5

Sporthallen Zuid, Amsterdam
Referees: Marcos Ferriera (BRA), Gillian Martindale (BAR), Neil Wilkinson (ENG)

August 17
15:45

Report

Canada	55–68	Italy
Scoring by quarter: 14–18, 16–17, 7–18, 18–15
Pts: Nurse 20; Rebs: Grant-Allen 12; Asts: three players 2		Pts: Peresson 18; Rebs: Barberis, Penna 6 Asts: Zandalasini 4

Sporthallen Zuid, Amsterdam
Referees: Fernando Rocha (POR), Toni Caldwell (AUS), Anthonie Sinterniklaas (NED)

August 17
21:15

Report

South Korea	89–131	United States
Scoring by quarter: 30–37, 19–33, 18–27, 22–34
Pts: Kim Hee-Jin 18; Rebs: Kim Hee-Jin 5 Asts: Shin Jih-Yun, Lee Seon-Young 4		Pts: Greenwell 23; Rebs: Turner, Reimer 10; Asts: Allen, Greenwell 7

Sporthallen Zuid, Amsterdam
Referees: Marcin Kowalski (POL), Tan Chin Siong (MAS), Annie Muchenu (ZIM)

August 18
12:15

Report

Italy	71–31	Mali
Scoring by quarter: 18–5, 13–7, 14–6, 26–13
Pts: Peresson 14; Rebs: Barberis 6 Asts: Peresson 8		Pts: Maiga 9 Rebs: Keita 6 Asts: Keita 2

Sporthallen Zuid, Amsterdam
Referees: Milija Vojinović (SRB), Annie Muchenu (ZIM), Julio Freile (PAN)

August 18
16:45

Report

Belgium	84–53	South Korea
Scoring by quarter: 24–15, 15–13, 28–6, 17–19
Pts: Abdelkader 29; Rebs: Mpoyi, Medjo 12; Asts: Allemand 6		Pts: Shin Jih-Yun, Yang In-Young 11; Rebs: Park Ji-Su 10; Asts: Shin Jih-Yun 3

Sporthallen Zuid, Amsterdam
Referees: Spyridon Gontas (GRE), Toni Caldwell (AUS), Anthonie Sinterniklaas (NED)

August 18
21:15

Report

United States	86–47	Canada
Scoring by quarter: 18–12, 23–12, 17–14, 28–9
Pts: DeShields 29; Rebs: Davis 9 Asts: Allen, DeShields 4		Pts: Nurse 8 Rebs: Caron-Goudreau, Potter 7 Asts: Nurse, Jardine 2

Sporthallen Zuid, Amsterdam
Referees: Boris Gabara (SVK), Neil Wilkinson (ENG), Marcos Ferreira (BRA)

August 19
12:15

Report

South Korea	76–61	Mali
Scoring by quarter: 29–16, 19–15, 8–21, 20–9
Pts: Kim Hee-Jin, Park Ji-Su 19; Rebs: Yang In-Young 8 Asts: An He-Ji 8		Pts: Dakouo 13; Rebs: Keita 12; Asts: Djire 3

Sporthallen Zuid, Amsterdam
Referees: Nicolas Maestre (FRA), Renaud Geller (BEL), Toni Caldwell (AUS)

August 19
16:45

Report

United States	83–43	Italy
Scoring by quarter: 25–13, 18–8, 24–9, 16–15
Pts: Greenwell 16; Rebs: Russell 11; Asts: DeShields 7		Pts: Marangoni 8 Rebs: Ercoli 8 Asts: Marangoni 3

Sporthallen Zuid, Amsterdam
Referees: Marcos Ferreira (BRA), Anthonie Sinterniklaas (NED), Gillian Martindale (BAR)

August 19
21:15

Report

Canada	50–45	Belgium
Scoring by quarter: 15–14, 8–6, 11–5, 16–20
Pts: Wolfram 12; Rebs: Grant-Allen 9 Asts: Caron-Goudreau 2		Pts: three players 9 Rebs: Lemmens, Linskens 6 Asts: Ben Abdelkader 3

Sporthallen Zuid, Amsterdam
Referees: Marcin Kowalski (POL), Milija Vojinović (SRB), Pualani Spurlock (USA)

August 21
10:00

Report

Italy	79–53	South Korea
Scoring by quarter: 17–11, 16–13, 24–16, 22–13
Pts: Penna 13; Rebs: Penna 11; Asts: Marangoni 6		Pts: Park Ji-Su 12; Rebs: Park Ji-Su 15; Asts: An He-Ji, Park Ji-Eun 2

Sporthallen Zuid, Amsterdam
Referees: Spyridon Gontas (GRE), Fernando Rocha (POR), Marcos Ferreira (BRA)

August 21
12:15

Report

Mali	42–77	Canada
Scoring by quarter: 6–26, 15–20, 6–22, 15–9
Pts: Keita 11; Rebs: Keita 8 Asts: Keita 3		Pts: Nurse 14; Rebs: Potter 10; Asts: Colley 3

Sporthallen Zuid, Amsterdam
Referees: Anthonie Sinterniklaas (NED), Toni Caldwell (AUS), Tan Chin Siong (MAS)

August 21
14:30

Report

Belgium	50–80	United States
Scoring by quarter: 15–19, 9–21, 19–18, 7–22
Pts: Grzesinski 10; Rebs: Ben Abdelkader 8 Asts: Ben Abdelkader 4		Pts: Greenwell 17; Rebs: DeShields 11; Asts: Harper 4

Sporthallen Zuid, Amsterdam
Referees: Nicolas Maestre (FRA), Julio Feile (PAN), Annie Muchenu (ZIM)

August 22
10:00

Report

United States	98–28	Mali
Scoring by quarter: 23–6, 31–5, 18–6, 26–11
Pts: three players 13; Rebs: Washington 10; Asts: Allen 7		Pts: Keita 10; Rebs: Dakouo 11; Asts: Fomba 3

Sporthallen Zuid, Amsterdam
Referees: Spyridon Gontas (GRE), Anthonie Sinterniklaas (NED), Gillian Martindale (BAR)

August 22
12:35

Report

Belgium	51–59	Italy
Scoring by quarter: 9–16, 21–17, 13–14, 8–12
Pts: Ben Abdelkader 13; Rebs: Linskens 8 Asts: five players 1		Pts: Penna 15; Rebs: Penna 13; Asts: Proro 4

Sporthallen Zuid, Amsterdam
Referees: Boris Gabara (SVK), Tan Chin Siong (MAS), Toni Caldwell (AUS)

August 22
14:30

Report

Canada	74–61	South Korea
Scoring by quarter: 15–12, 12–21, 24–9, 23–19
Pts: Grant-Allen 14; Rebs: Grant-Allen 13; Asts: Nurse 5		Pts: Kim Hee-Jin 18; Rebs: Park Ji-Su 8 Asts: Kim Si-On 4

Sporthallen Zuid, Amsterdam
Referees: Neil Wilkinson (ENG), Marcos Ferreira (BRA), Julio Freile (PAN)

=== Group B ===
Team	Pld	W	L	PF	PA	PD	Pts	Tiebreaker
Japan	5	4	1	397	378	+19	9	1–0
Netherlands	5	4	1	308	274	+34	9	0–1
Spain	5	3	2	337	279	+58	8	1–0
Australia	5	3	2	330	300	+30	8	0–1
Brazil	5	1	4	263	339	−76	6	
Turkey	5	0	5	287	352	−65	5	

August 17
11:15

Report

Japan	92–71	Brazil
Scoring by quarter: 17–16, 30–21, 19–22, 26–12
Pts: Nakamura 21; Rebs: Mawuli 12; Asts: Miyazaki 4		Pts: Sangalli 23; Rebs: Domingos 6 Asts: Lucchini, Domingos 2

Sporthallen Zuid, Amsterdam
Referees: Nicolas Maestre (FRA), Julio Freile (PAN), Heba El Hadidy (EGY)

August 17
13:30

Report

Australia	49–65	Spain
Scoring by quarter: 16–13, 17–12, 3–23, 13–17
Pts: Mangakahia 10; Rebs: Collins 9 Asts: Mangakahia 3		Pts: Rodriguez 19; Rebs: Pujol 10; Asts: Romero 5

Sporthallen Zuid, Amsterdam
Referees: Spyridon Gontas (GRE), Pualani Spurlock (USA), Renaud Geller (BEL)

August 17
19:00

Report

Turkey	60–67	Netherlands
Scoring by quarter: 11–17, 16–20, 16–13, 17–17
Pts: Coklar 22; Rebs: Coklar 14; Asts: Coklar 4		Pts: Slim 21; Rebs: Hof 8 Asts: Kuijt 5

Sporthallen Zuid, Amsterdam
Referees: Boris Gabara (SVK), Milija Vojinović (SRB), Kim Bo-Hui (KOR)

August 18
10:00

Report

Brazil	46–56	Australia
Scoring by quarter: 15–11, 9–13, 9–19, 13–13
Pts: Ribeiro 13; Rebs: three players 9 Asts: Lucchini, Pereira 3		Pts: Mangakahia 16; Rebs: Mangakahia 12; Asts: Mangakahia 3

Sporthallen Zuid, Amsterdam
Referees: Fernando Rocha (POR), Marcin Kowalski (POL), Kim Bo-Hui (KOR)

August 18
14:30

Report

Spain	77–49	Turkey
Scoring by quarter: 19–10, 24–11, 18–14, 16–14
Pts: Romero 15; Rebs: Quevedo 12; Asts: Lizarazu 5		Pts: Akbas 13; Rebs: Akbas 6 Asts: Atas 4

Sporthallen Zuid, Amsterdam
Referees: Nicolas Maestre (FRA), Karen Lasuik (CAN), Gillian Martindale (BAR)

August 18
19:00

Report

Netherlands	53–73	Japan
Scoring by quarter: 8–18, 15–12, 16–20, 14–23
Pts: Vos 12; Rebs: Kempers 9 Asts: Guijt 3		Pts: Nakamura 22; Rebs: Hatakenaka, Mawuli 7 Asts: Yamada, Mawuli 3

Sporthallen Zuid, Amsterdam
Referees: Pualani Spurlock (USA), Renaud Geller (BEL), Tan Chin Siong (MAS)

August 19
10:00

Report

Brazil	42–79	Spain
Scoring by quarter: 11–23, 13–7, 9–31, 9–18
Pts: Domingos 9 Rebs: Soares 8 Asts: Pereira 3		Pts: Rodriguez 14; Rebs: Sole 9 Asts: Pujol 6

Sporthallen Zuid, Amsterdam
Referees: Boris Gabara (SVK), Kim Bo-Hui (KOR), Tan Chin Siong (MAS)

August 19
14:30

Report

Japan	83–75	Turkey
Scoring by quarter: 21–21, 27–14, 13–28, 22–12
Pts: Nakamura 20; Rebs: Nakamura 9 Asts: Yamada 3		Pts: Atas, Coklar 20; Rebs: Coklar 13; Asts: Atas, Coklar 5

Sporthallen Zuid, Amsterdam
Referees: Fernando Rocha (POR), Neil Wilkinson (ENG), Annie Muchenu (ZIM)

August 19
19:00

Report

Australia	62–70	Netherlands
Scoring by quarter: 7–27, 20–12, 19–16, 16–15
Pts: Panousis 23; Rebs: Scherf 9 Asts: Turner 4		Pts: Cornelius 28; Rebs: Cornelius, de Jonge 8 Asts: Cornelius 5

Sporthallen Zuid, Amsterdam
Referees: Spyridon Gontas (GRE), Karen Lasuik (CAN), Julio Freile (PAN)

August 21
16:45

Report

Spain	79–83	Japan
Scoring by quarter: 21–20, 19–19, 23–22, 16–22
Pts: Romero 22; Rebs: Quevedo 11; Asts: Romero 5		Pts: Yamada 20; Rebs: Mawuli 15; Asts: Miyazaki 5

Sporthallen Zuid, Amsterdam
Referees: Marcin Kowalski (POL), Milija Vojinović (SRB), Kim Bo-Hui (KOR)

August 21
19:00

Report

Netherlands	62–42	Brazil
Scoring by quarter: 19–8, 10–17, 21–6, 12–11
Pts: Slim 19; Rebs: Slim 13; Asts: de Jonge 4		Pts: Soares 12; Rebs: Domingos 6 Asts: four players 2

Sporthallen Zuid, Amsterdam
Referees: Neil Wilkinson (ENG), Karen Lasuik (CAN), Pualani Spurlock (USA)

August 21
21:15

Report

Turkey	53–63	Australia
Scoring by quarter: 16–11, 10–18, 13–15, 14–19
Pts: Coklar 15; Rebs: Coklar 11; Asts: Akbas 3		Pts: Mangakahia, Brown 13; Rebs: Brown 14; Asts: Panousis 3

Sporthallen Zuid, Amsterdam
Referees: Boris Gabara (SVK), Renaud Geller (BEL), Gillian Martindale (BAR)

August 22
16:45

Report

Brazil	62–50	Turkey
Scoring by quarter: 14–15, 18–20, 20–9, 10–6
Pts: Sangalli 16; Rebs: Soares 13; Asts: Pereira 4		Pts: Coklar 17; Rebs: Coklar 16; Asts: Atas 3

Sporthallen Zuid, Amsterdam
Referees: Renaud Geller (BEL), Karen Lasuik (CAN), Pualani Spurlock (USA)

August 22
19:00

Report

Netherlands	56–37	Spain
Scoring by quarter: 8–10, 13–6, 16–15, 19–6
Pts: three players 9 Rebs: Hof 8 Asts: Zappeij 3		Pts: Navarro 8 Rebs: Lizarazu 7 Asts: Lizarazu 3

Sporthallen Zuid, Amsterdam
Referees: Fernando Rocha (POR), Marcin Kowalski (POL), Annie Muchenu (ZIM)

August 22
21:15

Report

Australia	100–66	Japan
Scoring by quarter: 17–20, 25–14, 32–16, 26–16
Pts: Smith 20; Rebs: Brown 9 Asts: Panousis 5		Pts: Miki 10; Rebs: Akaho, Tanaka 7 Asts: Morita 6

Sporthallen Zuid, Amsterdam
Referees: Nicolas Maestre (FRA), Milija Vojinović (SRB), Kim Bo-Hui (KOR)

== Knockout stage ==
=== Championship ===
Quarter-finals
August 24 – Amsterdam
United States	89
Australia	68
August 24 – Amsterdam
Netherlands	55
Canada	56
August 24 – Amsterdam
Italy	39
Spain	67
August 24 – Amsterdam
Belgium	64
Japan	70

Semi-finals
August 25 – Amsterdam
United States	84
Canada	59
August 25 – Amsterdam
Spain	91
Japan	62

Final
August 26 – Amsterdam
United States	75
Spain	62
Third place
August 26 – Amsterdam
Canada	84
Japan	77

==== Quarterfinals ====
August 24
14:30

Report

Italy	39–67	Spain
Scoring by quarter: 10–13, 9–13, 11–18, 9–23
Pts: Penna 8 Rebs: Ercoli 8 Asts: Zagni 2		Pts: Quevedo 19; Rebs: Lo, Quevedo 9 Asts: Romero 3

Sporthallen Zuid, Amsterdam
Referees: Nicolas Maestre (FRA), Neil Wilkinson (ENG), Pualani Spurlock (USA)

August 24
16:45

Report

Japan	70–64	Belgium
Scoring by quarter: 28–18, 14–8, 13–20, 15–18
Pts: Yamada 21; Rebs: Mawuli 16; Asts: four players 2		Pts: Abdelkader 19; Rebs: Mpoyi, Grzesinski 8 Asts: de Korte, Allemand 3

Sporthallen Zuid, Amsterdam
Referees: Fernando Rocha (POR), Karen Lasuik (CAN), Marcos Ferreira (BRA)

August 24
19:00

Report

Netherlands	55–56	Canada
Scoring by quarter: 9–12, 17–10, 13–14, 16–20
Pts: de Jonge 13; Rebs: Zappeij 8 Asts: three players 3		Pts: Nurse 18; Rebs: Grant-Allen 12; Asts: Colley 4

Sporthallen Zuid, Amsterdam
Referees: Spyridon Gontas (GRE), Marcin Kowalski (POL), Gillian Martindale (BAR)

August 24
21:15

Report

United States	89–68	Australia
Scoring by quarter: 19–24, 22–13, 24–14, 24–17
Pts: DeShields 19; Rebs: Russell 14; Asts: Reimer 3		Pts: Mangakahia 21; Rebs: Brown 11; Asts: Panousis 6

Sporthallen Zuid, Amsterdam
Referees: Boris Gabara (SVK), Julio Freile (PAN), Tan Chin Siong (MAS)

==== Semifinals ====
August 25
19:00

Report

Canada	59–84	United States
Scoring by quarter: 16–22, 16–19, 8–18, 19–25
Pts: Nurse, Wolfram 14; Rebs: Grant-Allen 7 Asts: Nurse 3		Pts: Harper 11; Rebs: Greenwell 12; Asts: Allen 4

Sporthallen Zuid, Amsterdam
Referees: Anthonie Sinterniklaas (NED), Boris Gabara (SVK), Toni Caldwell (AUS)

August 25
21:15

Report

Spain	91–62	Japan
Scoring by quarter: 26–16, 19–20, 23–15, 23–11
Pts: Romero 27; Rebs: Lo 9 Asts: Romero 5		Pts: Yamada 14; Rebs: Mawuli 8 Asts: Miyazaki 10

Sporthallen Zuid, Amsterdam
Referees: Fernando Rocha (POR), Renaud Geller (BEL), Marcos Ferreira (BRA)

==== Bronze medal game ====
August 26
13:30

Report

Canada	84–77	Japan
Scoring by quarter: 23–20, 17–31, 28–12, 16–14
Pts: Potter 17; Rebs: Wolfram 15; Asts: Nurse, Colley 4		Pts: Nakamura 27; Rebs: Nakamura 13; Asts: Mawuli, Yamada 3

Sporthallen Zuid, Amsterdam
Referees: Neil Wilkinson (ENG), Milija Vojinović (SRB), Kim Bo-Hui (KOR)

==== Final ====
August 26
16:00

Report

United States	75–62	Spain
Scoring by quarter: 22–8, 18–23, 18–17, 17–14
Pts: three players 13; Rebs: Greenwell 12; Asts: Allen 6		Pts: Lizarazu 19; Rebs: Arrojo 12; Asts: Romero 5

Sporthallen Zuid, Amsterdam
Referees: Spyridon Gontas (GRE), Nicolas Maestre (FRA), Karen Lasuik (CAN)

=== 5th–8th playoffs ===
Semi-finals
August 25 – Amsterdam
Australia	82
Netherlands	58
August 25 – Amsterdam
Italy	63
Belgium	55

Fifth place
August 26 – Amsterdam
Australia	58
Italy	49
Seventh place
August 26 – Amsterdam
Netherlands	65
Belgium	70

==== Semifinals ====
August 25
14:30

Report

Italy	63–55	Belgium
Scoring by quarter: 9–8, 17–17, 14–11, 23–19
Pts: Tagliamento 18; Rebs: Vanin 11; Asts: Porro, Barberis 2		Pts: Ben Abdelkader 24; Rebs: Ben Abdelkader 9 Asts: De Baets 4

Sporthallen Zuid, Amsterdam
Referees: Spyridon Gontas (GRE), Marcin Kowalski (POL), Annie Muchenu (ZIM)

August 25
16:45

Report

Netherlands	58–82	Australia
Scoring by quarter: 11–15, 19–23, 13–23, 15–21
Pts: de Jonge 14; Rebs: Noiba, Hof 7 Asts: de Jonge 3		Pts: Mangakahia 18; Rebs: Froling 8 Asts: Mangakahia 5

Sporthallen Zuid, Amsterdam
Referees: Neil Wilkinson (ENG), Milija Vojinović (SRB), Kim Bo-Hui (KOR)

==== Seventh place playoff ====
August 26
09:00

Report

Netherlands	65–70	Belgium
Scoring by quarter: 12–20, 21–8, 9–18, 23–24
Pts: Slim 23; Rebs: Ndiba 11; Asts: de Jonge, Ndiba 2		Pts: Ben Abdelkader 29; Rebs: Mpoyi 9 Asts: Allemand 9

Sporthallen Zuid, Amsterdam
Referees: Fernando Rocha (POR), Tan Chin Siong (MAS), Marcos Ferreira (BRA)

==== Fifth place playoff ====
August 26
11:15

Report

Australia	58–49	Italy
Scoring by quarter: 14–9, 19–11, 18–15, 7–14
Pts: Froling 12; Rebs: Panousis 13; Asts: Brown 2		Pts: Penna 12; Rebs: Penna 9 Asts: Proro 3

Sporthallen Zuid, Amsterdam
Referees: Marcin Kowalski (POL), Pualani Sprulock (USA), Gillian Martindale (BAR)

=== 9th–12th playoffs ===
Semi-finals
August 25 – Amsterdam
South Korea	82
Turkey	79
August 25 – Amsterdam
Mali	58
Brazil	51

Ninth place
August 26 – Amsterdam
South Korea	57
Mali	39
Eleventh place
August 26 – Amsterdam
Turkey	61
Brazil	66

==== Semifinals ====
August 24
10:00

Report

South Korea	82–79	Turkey
Scoring by quarter: 19–20, 18–17, 14–22, 31–20
Pts: Shin Jih-Yun 21; Rebs: Park Ji-Su 14; Asts: Shin Jih-Yun 4		Pts: Gülcan 21; Rebs: Coklar 16; Asts: Atas 6

Sporthallen Zuid, Amsterdam
Referees: Milija Vojinović (SRB), Anthonie Sinterniklaas (NED), Toni Caldwell (AUS)

August 24
12:15

Report

Brazil	51–58	Mali
Scoring by quarter: 12–13, 8–15, 21–12, 10–18
Pts: Sangalli 11; Rebs: Soares 17; Asts: Sangalli, Pereira 3		Pts: N'Diaye 18; Rebs: Fomba 10; Asts: Djire 2

Sporthallen Zuid, Amsterdam
Referees: Renaud Geller (BEL), Annie Muchnu (ZIM), Kim Bo-Hui (KOR)

==== Eleventh place playoff ====
August 25
10:00

Report

Turkey	61–66	Brazil
Scoring by quarter: 14–14, 16–19, 17–12, 14–21
Pts: Atas, Gülcan 18; Rebs: Coklar 9 Asts: Akbas, Coklar 3		Pts: dos Reis 18; Rebs: Soares 14; Asts: Pereira 5

Sporthallen Zuid, Amsterdam
Referees: Nicolas Maestre (FRA), Gillian Martindale (BAR), Tan Chin Siong (MAS)

==== Ninth place playoff ====
August 25
12:15

Report

South Korea	57–39	Mali
Scoring by quarter: 5–13, 15–7, 24–7, 13–12
Pts: Park Ji-Su 12; Rebs: three players 6 Asts: An He-Ji 6		Pts: Maiga 21; Rebs: Keita 22; Asts: N'Diaye, Fomba 3

Sporthallen Zuid, Amsterdam
Referees: Karen Lasuik (CAN), Pualani Spurlock (USA), Marcos Ferreira (BRA)

== Final standings ==
Rank	Team	Record
Gold medal	United States	8–0
Silver medal	Spain	5–3
Bronze medal	Canada	5–3
4th	Japan	5–3
5th	Australia	5–3
6th	Italy	5–3
7th	Belgium	3–5
8th	Netherlands	4–4
9th	South Korea	3–4
10th	Mali	1–6
11th	Brazil	2–5
12th	Turkey	0–7

== Awards ==
2012 Under-17 World Championship for Women winner

United States
Second title

Most Valuable Player
(United States) Diamond DeShields

All-Tournament Team

- (United States) Diamond DeShields
- (United States) Linnae Harper
- (Spain) Leticia Romero
- (Japan) Yunika Nakamura
- (Japan) Evelyn Mawuli

== Statistical leaders ==
Points

Name	PPG
(Belgium) Hind Ben Abdelkader	19.4
(Japan) Yunika Nakamura	17.8
(Japan) Ai Yamada	15.0
(United States) Diamond Deshields	14.8
(Turkey) Hülya Coklar	14.7

Rebounds

Name	RPG
(Turkey) Hülya Coklar	11.9
(Mali) Awa Keita	10.1
(Brazil) Monique Soares	9.9
(Japan) Evelyn Mawuli	9.5
(Canada) Saicha Grant-Allen	8.9

Assists

Name	APG
(United States) Lindsay Allen	4.1
(Belgium) Julie Allemand	3.8
(Japan) Saori Miyazaki	3.6
(South Korea) An He-Ji	3.6
(Spain) Leticia Romero	3.4

Blocks

Name	BPG
(South Korea) Park Ji-Su	3.9
(Australia) Alanna Smith	1.8
(Canada) Emma Wolfram	1.8
(Turkey) Hülya Coklar	1.7
(Mali) Awa Keita	1.7
(Brazil) Monique Soares	1.7

Steals

Name	SPG
(United States) Linnae Harper	4.3
(Japan) Saori Miyazaki	3.9
(Mali) Awa Keita	3.3
(Brazil) Carla Lucchini	3.0
(Canada) Shaylisha Colley	2.8
