= St. Stephen Cathedral (Owensboro, Kentucky) =

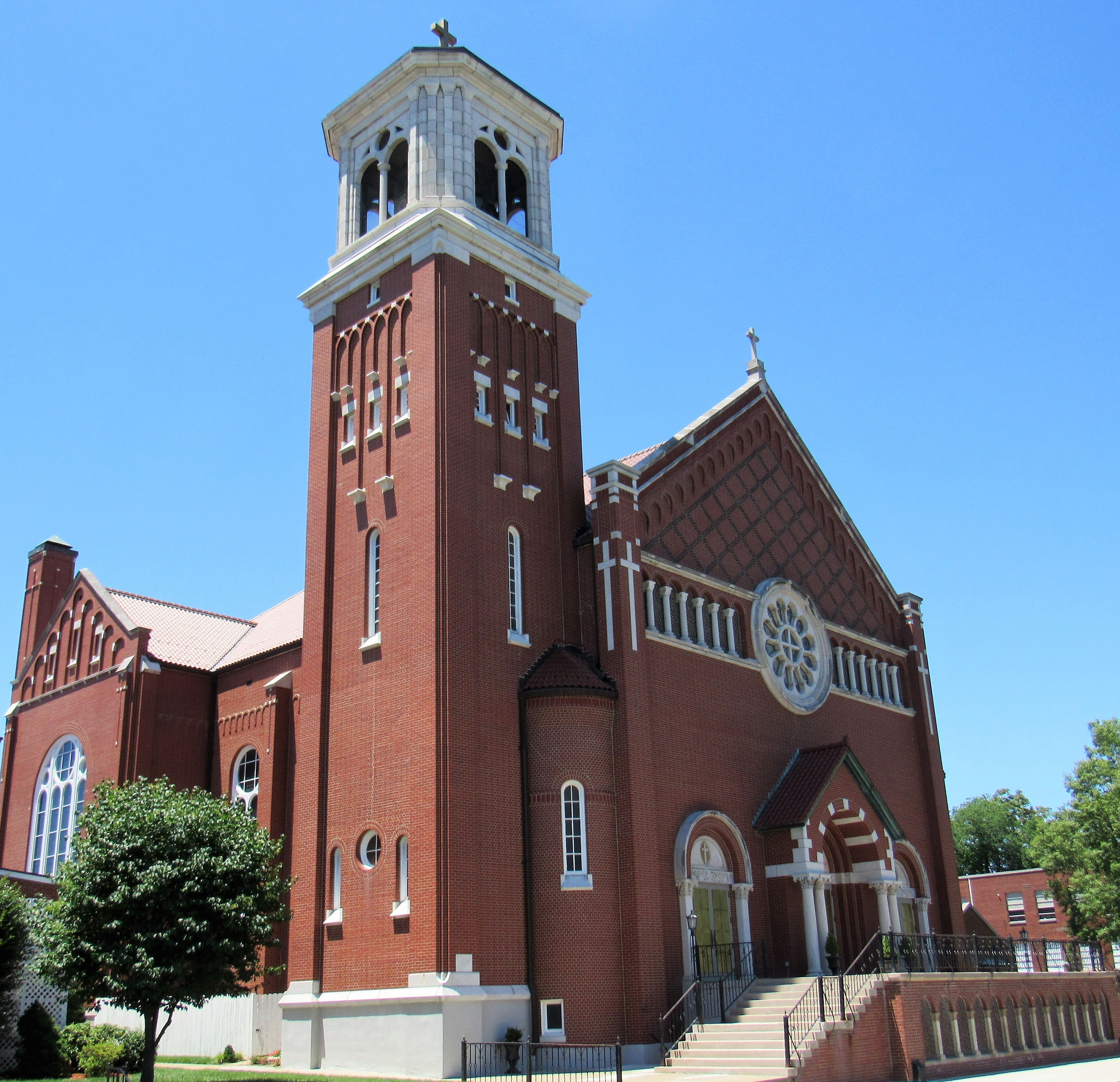

- Location in Kentucky St. Stephen Cathedral (the United States)
- 37°46′11″N 87°06′57″W
- Location: 610 Locust St. Owensboro, Kentucky
- Country: United States
- Denomination: Roman Catholic Church
- Website: www.ststephencathedral.org

History
- Founded: 1839

Architecture
- Style: Italianate
- Completed: 1926

Specifications
- Materials: Brick

Administration
- Diocese: Owensboro

Clergy
- Bishop: Most Rev. William Medley

St. Stephen Cathedral is a Catholic cathedral and parish church located in Owensboro, Kentucky, United States. It is the seat of the Diocese of Owensboro.

== History ==
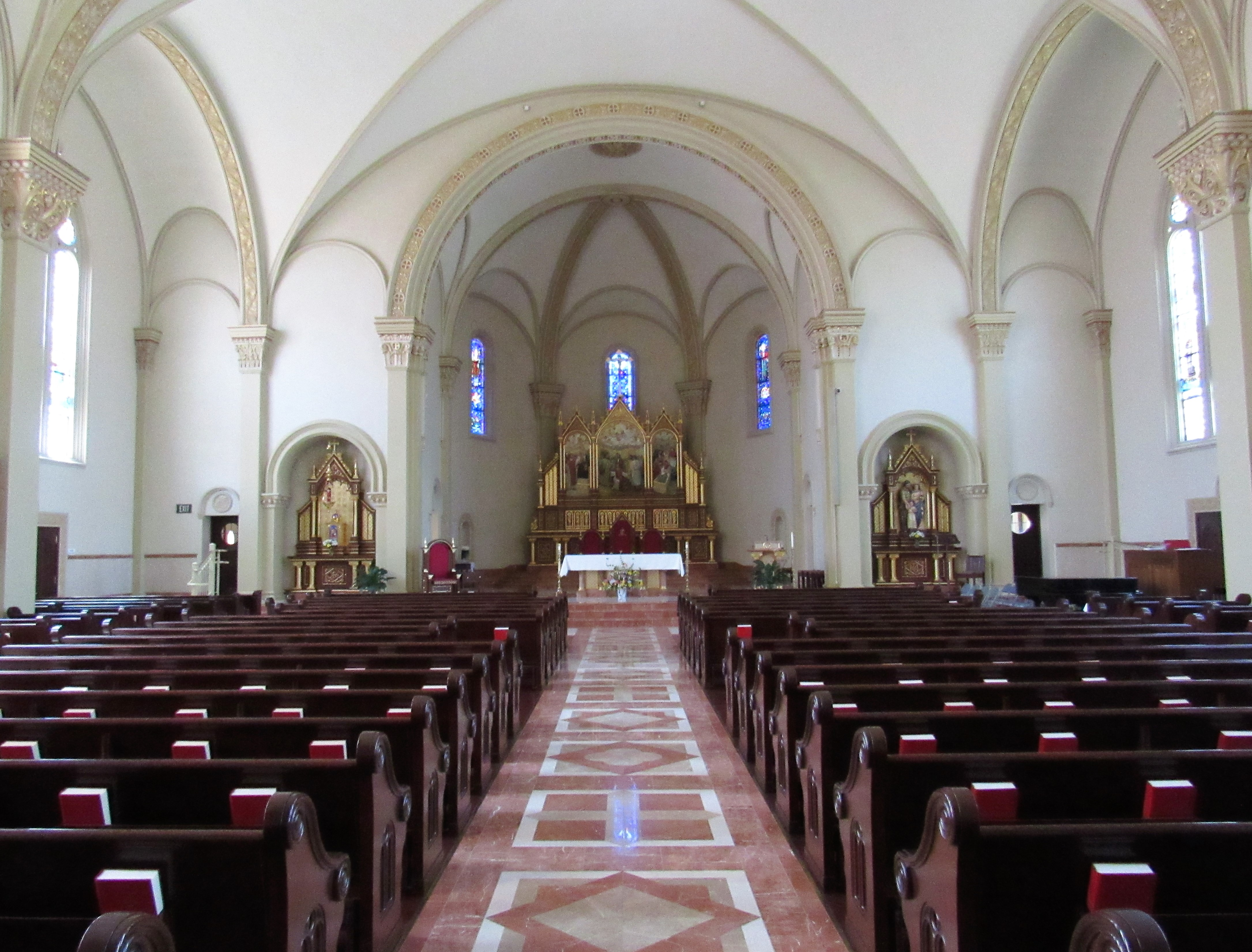
Cathedral interior

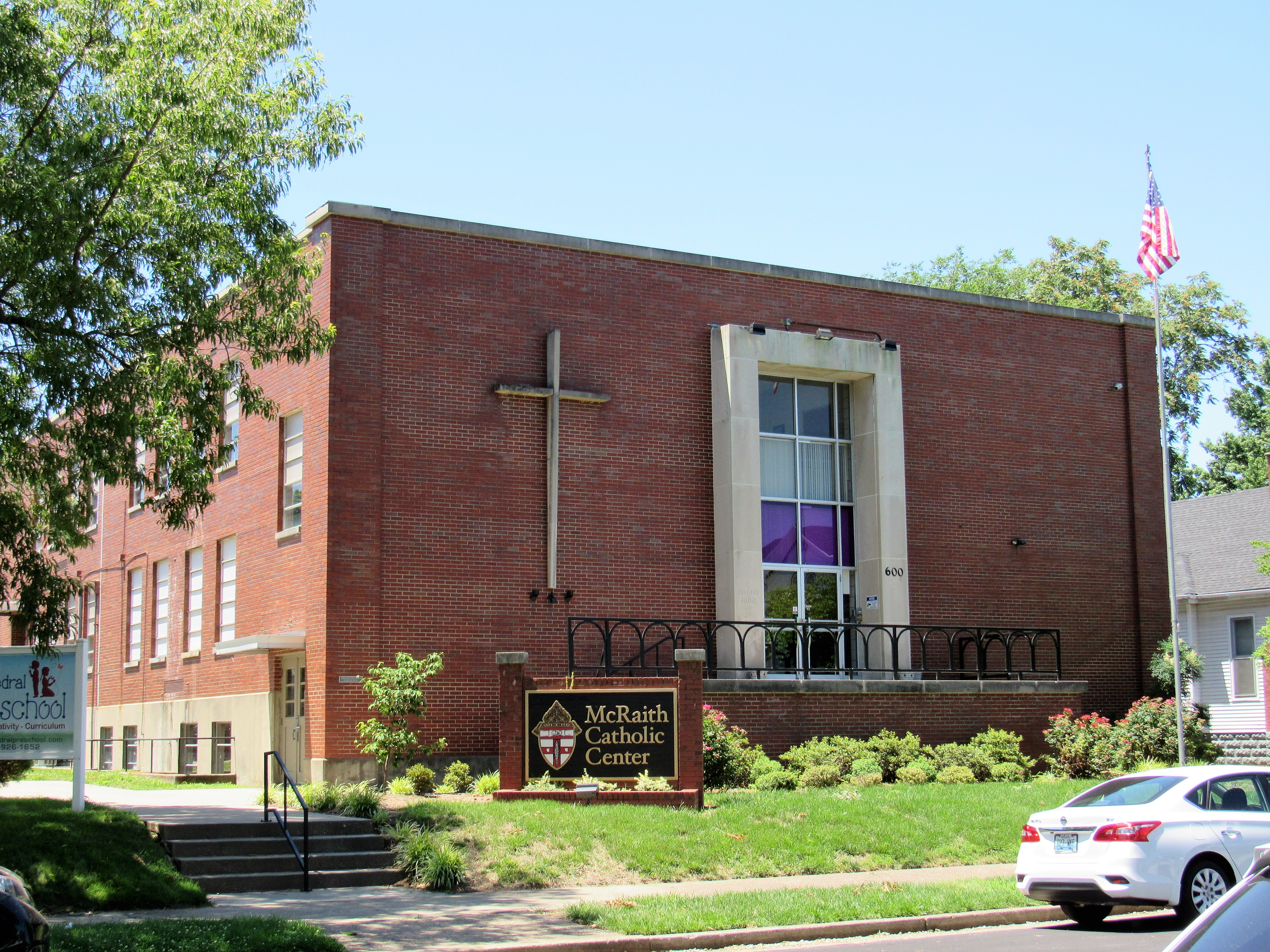
The McRaith Catholic Center is the former school building.

In the early years of Daviess County priests would celebrate Mass in the homes of the settlers. The first church dedicated to St. Stephen in Owensboro was built in 1839 and the Rev. John C. Wathen was appointed the parish's first pastor. As the town and parish continued to grow a larger church was needed and so a second church was built on the same site as the first in 1856. The present church was built on Locust Street between 1924 and 1926.

On December 9, 1937 Pope Pius XII established the Diocese of Owensboro. St. Stephen's was chosen as the new diocese's cathedral. The first Bishop of Owensboro, Francis Ridgley Cotton, was consecrated in St. Stephen's Cathedral on February 24, 1938.

The roof of the cathedral was restored in 2007, replacing existing shingles with Ludowici tiles.

On 29 May 2017, the cathedral hosted the funeral of Nicky Hayden, the former MOTO GP and Owensboro native who died in Cesena, Italy, after a road accident in Rimini while he was training on a bicycle.

=== Catholic schools ===
The first school in Daviess County was St. Francis Academy. It was opened by the Sisters of Charity of Nazareth in 1849.

The same year that St. Stephen's became a cathedral, 1939, its first parish school opened on Frederica Streets with five grades. In 1951 Owensboro Catholic High School replaced St. Francis Academy. A new St. Stephen's school opened in 1962 on Locust Street.

The parochial schools in Owensboro consolidated in 1989 and used the building at St. Angela Merici for the new school. That same year a preschool opened at St. Stephen's.

== See also ==
- List of Catholic cathedrals in the United States
- List of cathedrals in the United States
