= Diocese of Owensboro =

Latin Catholic ecclesiastical jurisdiction in Kentucky, United States

Coordinates: 37°45′28″N 87°07′06″W

Diocese of Owensboro Dioecesis Owensburgensis
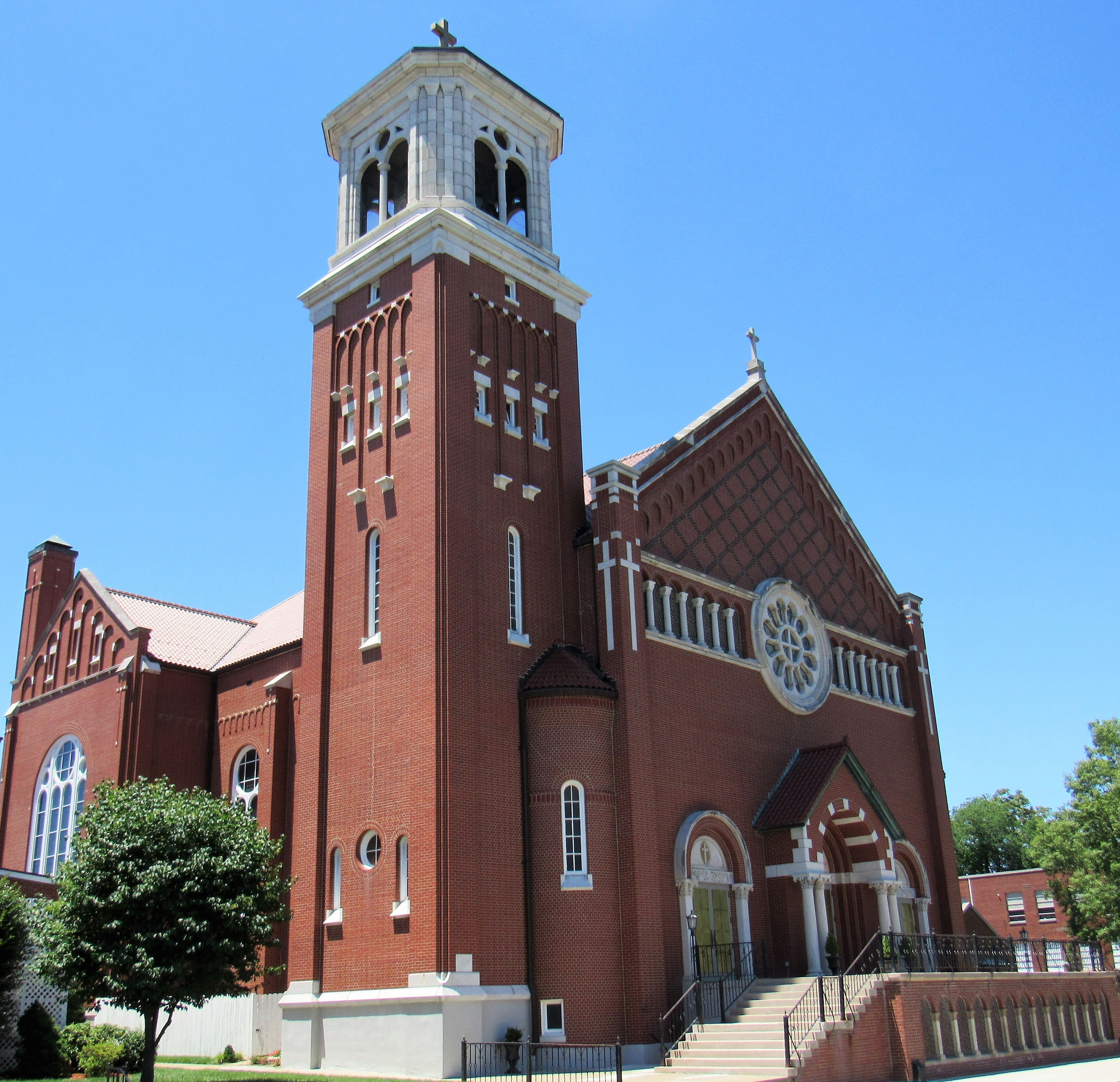
- St. Stephen Cathedral

- Coat of arms

Location
- Country: United States
- Territory: Western Kentucky
- Ecclesiastical province: Archdiocese of Louisville

Statistics
- Population: 51,780 (6.2%)
- Parishes: 78
- Schools: 19

Information
- Denomination: Catholic
- Sui iuris church: Latin Church
- Rite: Roman Rite
- Established: December 9, 1937
- Cathedral: St. Stephen's Cathedral
- Patron saint: St. Stephen

Current leadership
- Pope: Leo XIV
- Bishop: William Medley
- Metropolitan Archbishop: Shelton Fabre

Map
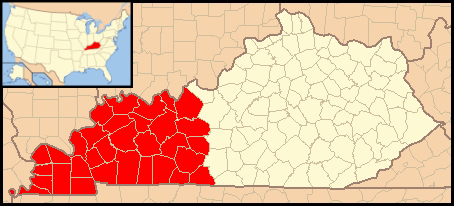

Website
- owensborodiocese.org

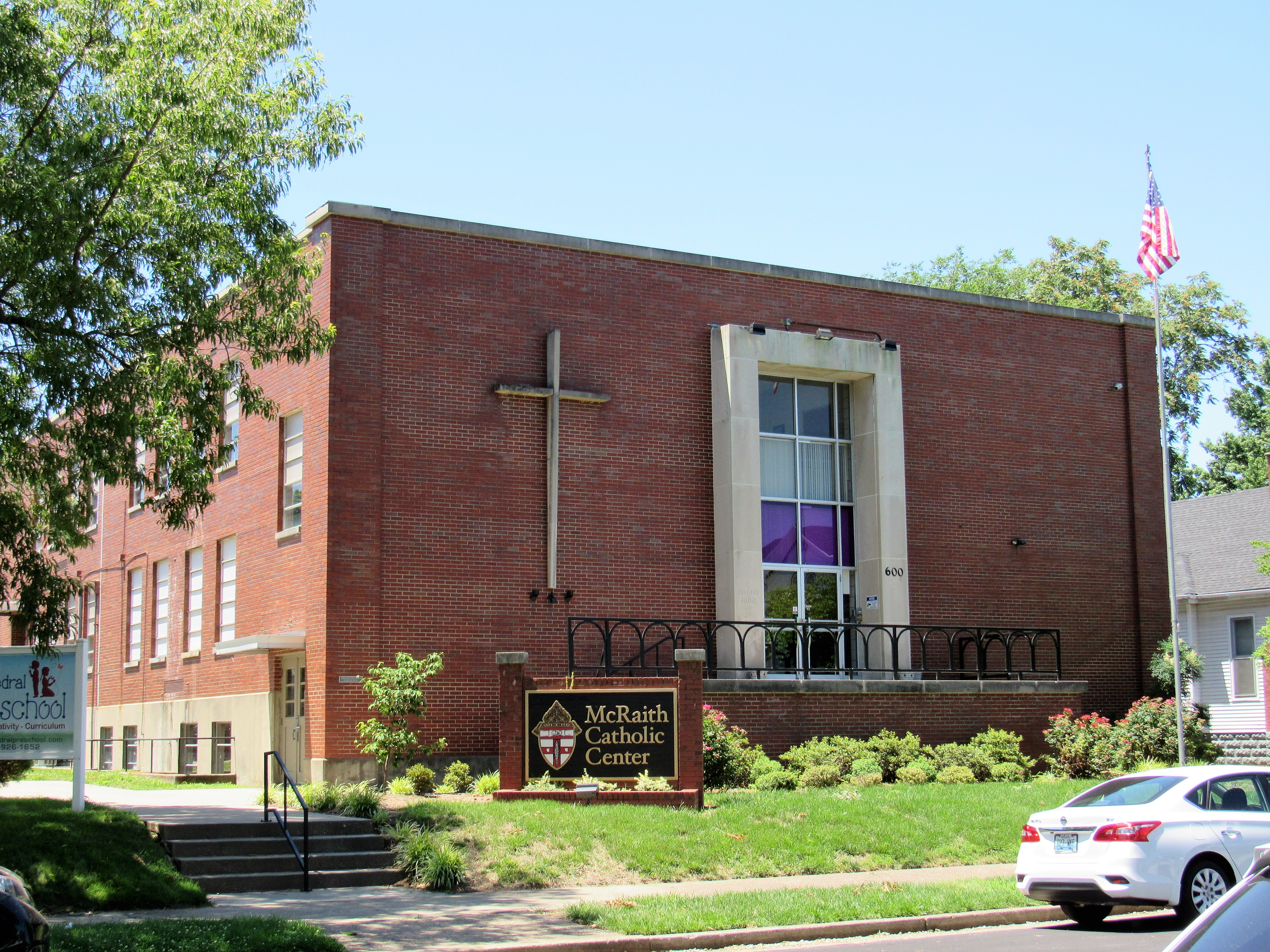
McRaith Catholic Center, Owensboro (2018)

The Diocese of Owensboro (Latin: Dioecesis Owensburgensis) is a diocese of the Catholic Church in western Kentucky in the United States. The current bishop is William Medley.

== History ==
=== 1700 to 1800 ===
The first Catholic immigrants to the Kentucky area came from Maryland in 1785. By 1796, approximately 300 Catholic families were living in the new state of Kentucky. Among the early missionaries was Stephen Badin who set out on foot for Kentucky on September 3, 1793, sent by Bishop John Carroll of the Diocese of Baltimore. For the next 14 years Badin traveled on foot, horseback and boat between widely scattered Catholic settlements in Kentucky and the Northwest Territory. For three years, Badin was the only priest in the whole of Kentucky.

=== 1800 to 1900 ===
In 1808, Pope Pius VII erected the Diocese of Bardstown, covering Kentucky and most of the Northwest Territory. During the early 1830s, priests would visit Daviess County, celebrating mass and performing sacraments in private homes. The first parish in Owensboro was St. Stephen, erected in 1839.

In 1841, Pope Leo XIII suppressed the Diocese of Bardstown, which by this time encompassed only Kentucky. In its place, he created the Diocese of Louisville, with jurisdiction over Kentucky. The Owensboro region would remain part of the Diocese of Louisville for the next 96 years. Whitesville saw the opening of its first Catholic Church, St. Mary of the Woods, in 1845.

The first Catholic church in Paducah was St. Francis de Sales, dedicated in 1849. That same year, the Sisters of Charity of Nazareth opened the first school in Owensboro, St. Francis Academy.

=== 1900 to 1950 ===
In 1925, the Ursuline Sisters of Mount Saint Joseph founded Saint Joseph Junior College for Women in Maple Mount. Today it is Brescia University.

Pope Pius XI erected the Diocese of Owensboro in territory taken from the Diocese of Louisville in 1937. The pope also elevated the Diocese of Louisville to an archdiocese and made the new Diocese of Owensboro as one of its suffragans. Pius XI named Francis Cotton of Louisville as the first bishop of Owensboro. Cotton had first planned to establish his cathedral in Henderson, Kentucky at Holy Name of Jesus Church, but then changed it to Owensboro. The diocese's cathedral is named after St. Stephen, the first Christian martyr.

After his consecration, Cotton brought the Catholic Students' Mission Crusade, a national organization for helping the poor, to the diocese. By 1942, the diocese had collected over $1 million in supplies for distribution in Europe and China after the ravages of World War II. In February 1943, Cotton held a synod in the diocese to set its laws and constitution. After 1945, the Ursuline Sisters opened a second, coed campus of Saint Joseph Junior College in Owensboro.

=== 1950 to 2000 ===
The Ursuline Sisters combined the two St. Joseph campuses in Owensboro in 1950 under the name Brescia College. It is today Brescia University. The Diocese in 1959 purchased Riverside Hospital in Paducah, renaming it Lourdes Hospital. The Sisters of St. Francis from Tiffin, Ohio, were brought in to operate it. Today it is Mercy Health — Lourdes Hospital. Cotton died in 1960.

In March 1961, Henry Soenneker was appointed the second bishop of Owensboro by Pope John XXIII. After Soenneker retired as bishop of Owensboro in June 1982, Pope John Paul II in October 1982 named John McRaith of the Diocese of New Ulm to replace Soenneker. He established the diocesan newspaper, The Western Kentucky Catholic, in 1984.

=== 2000 to present ===
McRaith retired as bishop of Owensboro in January 2009.Pope Benedict XVI named William Medley of Louisville as the next bishop of Owensboro in 2009. Western Kentucky in December 2021 was devastated by a tornado outbreak that killed 57 people and caused millions of dollars of damage. The diocese received $10 million in aid from Catholic Charities USA and other charities to help victims recover.

In 2023, Medley visited Nigeria to thank the families of Nigerian priests serving in his diocese. He had made similar trips to India, Myanmar, and Mexico to thank the families of priests from those nations.

Medley in March 2026 announced that the diocese was withdrawing from the Christian Brothers Employee Retirement Program (CBERP). Operated by the Christian Brothers, the CBERP provide pension services to diocese. Medley left the organization because it was facing a $800 million deficit and was asking dioceses to contribute more. In June 2026, Medley ordered the termination of the Traditional Latin Mass in the diocese in comformance with Pope Francis’ 2021 motu proprio, Traditionis Custodes.

=== Sexual abuse ===
The priest Louis Piskula was arrested for sexual abuse of a minor in February 2011. After pleading guilty, Piskula was sentenced to five years in prison in 2014.

In October 2018, the diocese permanently removed Gerald Baker from ministry after a credible finding of sexual abuse accusations. He had been accused by three minors in 2016 when he was serving at a parish in Whitesville; at that point, the diocese put Baker on temporary suspension.

In April 2019, the diocese released a list of 15 priests who were accused of sexually abusing minors.

== Bishops ==
=== Bishops of Owensboro ===
1. Francis Ridgley Cotton (1937–1960)
2. Henry Joseph Soenneker (1961–1982)
3. John Jeremiah McRaith (1982–2009)
4. William Francis Medley (2009–present)

== Education ==
As of 2026, the Diocese of Owensboro has three high schools, two middle schools and 12 elementary schools.

=== High schools ===
- Owensboro Catholic High School – Owensboro
- St. Mary High School – Paducah
- Trinity High School – Whitesville

=== University ===
Brescia University – Owensboro
