= 2013 McDonald's All-American Girls Game =

East	West
64	92
	1st half	2nd half	Total
East	35	29	64
West	45	47	92
- Date: April 3, 2013
- Venue: United Center, Chicago, Illinois
- MVP: Mercedes Russell
- Referees: Jodie Duffe; Michelle Gosa; Denita Lee-Johnson
- Network: ESPNU

McDonald's All-American

The 2013 McDonald's All-American Girls Game is an All-star basketball game that was played on April 3, 2013, at the United Center in Chicago, Illinois, home of the Chicago Bulls. The game's rosters featured the best and most highly recruited high school girls graduating in 2013. The game is the 12th annual version of the McDonald's All-American Game first played in 2002.

== 2013 Game ==
The West team started strong, opening up an eleven-point lead early at 17–6. The game was roughly even from then until halftime, when the West led by ten points. Neither team shot well, with the East hitting just over 30% of their shots, and the West hitting 36%. However, the better shooting percentage and a rebounding edge by the West team, coupled with 21 turnovers by the East team, resulted in a large margin of victory by the West team, with a final score of 92–64. The West's Mercedes Russell had a double-double with 16 points and 12 rebounds, which helped her win the Award for Most Outstanding Player of the tournament.

=== 2013 East Roster ===
ESPNW 100 Rank	Name	Height	Position	Hometown	High school	College choice
25	Lindsay Allen	5–8	G	Washington, DC	St. John's College	Notre Dame
15	Lexie Brown	5–9	G	Suwanee, Georgia	North Gwinnett	Maryland
28	Alaina Coates	6–4	C	Irmo, South Carolina	Dutch Fork	South Carolina
24	Nia Coffey	6–1	F	Minneapolis, Minnesota	Hopkins	Northwestern
2	Kaela Davis	6–2	G	Buford, Georgia	Buford	Georgia Tech
3	Diamond DeShields	6–2	G	Norcross, Georgia	Norcross	North Carolina
37	Makayla Epps	5–8	G	Lebanon, Kentucky	Marion County	Kentucky
22	Kai James	6–4	C	Palm Beach Gardens, Florida	Dwyer	Florida State
23	Stephanie Mavunga	6–2	F	Brownsburg, Indiana	Brownsburg	North Carolina
4	Taya Reimer	6–2	F	Indianapolis, Indiana	Hamilton Southeastern	Notre Dame
19	Ieshia Small	6–0	G	Tallahassee, Florida	Florida High	Baylor
13	Ronni Williams	6–0	F	Port Orange, Florida	Atlantic (FL)	Florida

=== 2013 West Roster ===
ESPNW 100 Rank	Name	Height	Position	Hometown	High school	College choice
10	Oderah Chidom	6–3	F	Oakland, California	Bishop O'Dowd	Duke
12	Kendall Cooper	6–3	C	Carson, California	St. Anthony (CA)	Duke
16	Rebekah Dahlman	5–9	G	Braham, Minnesota	Braham	Vanderbilt
6	Rebecca Greenwell	6–1	G	Owensboro, Kentucky	Owensboro Catholic	Duke
5	Linnae Harper	5–6	G	Chicago, Illinois	Whitney Young	Kentucky
20	Kailee Johnson	6–3	F	Portland, Oregon	Central Catholic	Stanford
11	Erica McCall	6–3	F	Bakersfield, California	Ridgeview	Stanford
26	Kelsey Plum	5–9	G	Poway, California	La Jolla Country Day	Washington
42	Jordan Reynolds	6–1	G	Portland, Oregon	Central Catholic	Tennessee
1	Mercedes Russell	6–5	C	Springfield, Oregon	Springfield	Tennessee
9	Tyler Scaife	5–8	G	Little Rock, Arkansas	Hall	Rutgers
14	Jessica Washington	5–8	G	Tulsa, Oklahoma	Jenks	North Carolina

=== Coaches ===
The East team was coached by:

- Head Coach—Fred Priester of Oakton High School (Vienna, Virginia)
- Assistant coach—Krista Jay of Oakton High School (Vienna, Virginia)
- Assistant coach—Derek Fisher of Loudoun County High School (Leesburg, Virginia)

The West team was coached by:

- Head Coach - Anthony Smith of Bolingbrook High School (Bolingbrook, Illinois)
- Assistant coach - Willie Smith of Bolingbrook High School (Bolingbrook, Illinois)
- Assistant coach - Evan Bercot of Bolingbrook High School (Bolingbrook, Illinois)

== All-American Week ==
=== Schedule ===
- Monday, April 1: Powerade Jamfest
  - Slam Dunk Contest
  - Three-Point Shoot-out
  - Timed Basketball Skills Competition
- Wednesday, April 3: 12th Annual Girls All-American Game

=== Contest Winners ===
- Jessica Washington won the skills competition
- Rebecca Greenwell won the three point shooting competition

== See also ==
2013 McDonald's All-American Boys Game
