= St. Mary High School (Paducah, Kentucky) =

Location
- 1243 Elmdale Road; Paducah, KY 42003; United States; 37.05070°N 88.64474°W

Information
- School type: Private
- Motto: The Pursuit of Excellence Through Christ!
- Founded: 1965
- School district: Roman Catholic Diocese of Owensboro
- Principal: Holly Miller
- Grades: 9–12
- Enrollment: 163 (2009–10)
- Campus: Small city
- Colors: Blue and Gold
- Nickname: Vikings and Lady Vikings
- Accreditation: Southern Association of Colleges and Schools
- Yearbook: "The Voyage"
- Feeder schools: St. Mary Middle School
- Athletic Director: Kris Durfee
- Website: www.smss.org

St. Mary High School is a private, Roman Catholic high school in Paducah, Kentucky. It is located in the Roman Catholic Diocese of Owensboro, and is part of the St. Mary School System, which also includes elementary and middle schools.

== Background ==
Founded in 1858 it has 98% of graduates attending college and 50% receiving scholarships. It has state champions in many sports teams and an award-winning music program.

== State champions ==
- Boys Cross Country: 1998
- Individual Boys Cross Country: Matthew Shoulta (2003, 2004), James Maglasang (2008)
- Girls Cross Country: 1994, 1995, 1996
- Individual Girls Cross Country: Adrienne Lima (1994), Jackie Wagner (1997, 1998, 2000)
- Boys Golf: 2005
- Individual Boys Golf: Russ Cochran (1975), Case Cochran (2005, 2006)

== Notable alumni ==
- Paducah Artist, Yeiser Art Museum, the late Mary Yeiser, 1921
- Former KY State Justice Most Honorable Bill Graves, 1954
- Paducah Businessman, the late Fred Paxton, 1950
- Russ Cochran, current PGA Tour golfer, KHSAA Individual Boys' Golf State Champion, 1975
