= Rebecca Greenwell =

American basketball player

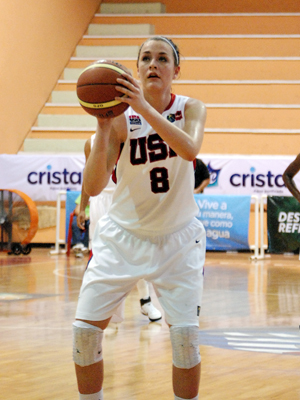
- Greenwell in 2011

Personal information
- Born: February 27, 1995 (age 31) Evansville, Indiana, U.S.
- Listed height: 6 ft 1 in (1.85 m)

Career information
- High school: Owensboro Catholic (Owensboro, Kentucky)
- College: Duke (2014–2018)
- WNBA draft: 2018: 3rd round, 31st overall pick
- Drafted by: Washington Mystics
- Playing career: 2018–present
- Position: Guard

Career highlights
- First-team All-ACC (2017); McDonald's All-American (2013); FIBA Americas Championship MVP (2011)
- Stats at Basketball Reference
Medals
Women's basketball
Representing United States
FIBA Under-17 World Cup
Gold medal – first place	2012 Netherlands	Team
FIBA Americas Under-16 Championship
Gold medal – first place	2011 Mexico	Team

Rebecca Danielle Greenwell (born February 27, 1995) is an American basketball player.

== Early life ==
Greenwell started playing for the Tennessee Flight, an AAU team, in seventh grade. She would go on to win three Nike Nationals championships with the program.

== High school career ==
Greenwell attended Owensboro Catholic in Owensboro, Kentucky, where she was named to the Academic All-State team and set numerous school records. She missed her junior year after tearing her ACL at the 2011 FIBA 3x3 Under-18 World Championships. Returning for her senior season, Greenwell hit 17 3-pointers against Whitesville Trinity, breaking a national high school girls basketball record. After narrowing her list down to two, she chose to play basketball for Joanne P. McCallie at Duke University. Greenwell went on to take part in the 2013 McDonald's All-American Game, where she suffered another ACL tear. Her high school career was marked by two stints with the United States U16 and U17 national teams, with whom she won two gold medals.

== College career ==
Greenwell elected to redshirt her freshman year at Duke after undergoing further surgery to repair her meniscus. She later returned and found success, averaging 14.0 and 15.1 points per game during her freshman and sophomore campaigns, respectively. Greenwell was named to the 2015-16 All-ACC second team after her sophomore year. During her junior season, she received espnW's national player of the week honor after scoring 29 points against then-No. 3-ranked South Carolina.

=== College statistics ===
Year	Team	GP	Points	FG%	3P%	FT%	RPG	APG	SPG	BPG	PPG
2014-15	Duke	34	476	39.6	35.6	78.9	5.5	2.1	1.9	0.2	14.0
2015-16	Duke	30	452	44.3	41.7	77.8	5.9	2.1	1.5	0.2	15.1
2016-17	Duke	24	400	44.1	38.8	86.3	6.0	2.4	1.6	0.1	16.7
Career	Duke	88	1328	42.5	38.6	80.7	5.8	2.2	1.7	0.2	15.1

== Professional career ==
She was drafted by the Washington Mystics in the 2018 WNBA draft but was suspended after she underwent knee surgery. The Mystics retain her rights.
