= Henry Joseph Soenneker =

American Roman Catholic prelate

His Excellency, The Most Reverend Henry Joseph Soenneker
- Bishop of Owensboro
- Church: Roman Catholic Church
- See: Diocese of Owensboro
- In office: April 26, 1961 to June 30, 1982
- Predecessor: Francis Ridgley Cotton
- Successor: John Jeremiah McRaith

Orders
- Ordination: May 26, 1934 by James Joseph Hartley
- Consecration: April 26, 1961 by Peter William Bartholome

Personal details
- Born: May 27, 1907 Melrose, Minnesota, US
- Died: September 24, 1987 (aged 80) Owensboro, Kentucky, US
- Education: Pontifical College Josephinum; Catholic University of America
- Motto: Omnes unum in Christo (All one in Christ)

Henry Joseph Soenneker (May 27, 1907—September 24, 1987) was an American prelate of the Roman Catholic Church. He served as the second bishop of the Diocese of Owensboro in Kentucky from 1961 to 1982.

== Biography ==
=== Early life ===
Henry Soenneker was born on May 27, 1907, in Melrose, Minnesota, to Henry and Mary (née Wessel) Soenneker. He studied at the Pontifical College Josephinum in Columbus, Ohio, obtaining a Bachelor of Arts degree in 1930.

=== Priesthood ===
Soenneker was ordained to the priesthood by Bishop James Hartley for the Diocese of St. Cloud on May 26, 1934. After his ordination, Soenneker was appointed as curate at St. Anthony Parish in St. Cloud, Minnesota. He also served as a high school teacher and chaplain at a Veterans Administration hospital.

In 1940, Soenneker left his current positions to become chaplain to the Sisters of St. Francis at Little Falls, Minnesota. He travelled in 1948 to Washington D.C. to attend the Catholic University of America, earning a Licentiate of Canon Law in 1950. After returning to Minnesota, he was named spiritual director of St. John's Seminary in Collegeville.

=== Bishop of Owensboro ===
On March 10, 1961, Soenneker was appointed the second bishop of the Diocese of Owensboro by Pope John XXIII. He received his episcopal consecration at the Cathedral of Saint Mary in St. Cloud on April 26, 1961, from Bishop Peter Bartholome, with Bishops Francis Schenk and Joseph Mueller serving as co-consecrators. Soenneker attended all four sessions of the Second Vatican Council in Rome between 1962 and 1965.

=== Retirement and death ===
Pope John Paul II accepted Soenneker's resignation as bishop of Owensboro on June 30, 1982. Henry Soenneker died in Owensboro on September 24, 1987, at age 80. The Bishop Soenneker Home, an assisted living facility in Knottsville, Kentucky, was named after him.

== Episcopal succession ==
Catholic Church titles
Preceded by Francis Ridgley Cotton	Bishop of Owensboro; 1961—1982	Succeeded by John Jeremiah McRaith
