= John Jeremiah McRaith =

His Excellency, The Most Reverend John Jeremiah McRaith
- Bishop of Owensboro
- Church: Roman Catholic Church
- See: Diocese of Owensboro
- In office: December 15, 1982 to January 5, 2009
- Predecessor: Henry Joseph Soenneker
- Successor: William Francis Medley

Orders
- Ordination: February 21, 1960 by Alphonse James Schladweiler
- Consecration: December 15, 1982 by Thomas C. Kelly

Personal details
- Born: December 6, 1934 Hutchinson, Minnesota, US
- Died: March 19, 2017 (aged 82) Owensboro, Kentucky, US
- Education: St. John's Preparatory School; Loras College; St. Bernard Seminary

Styles of John Jeremiah McRaith
- Reference style: The Most Reverend
- Spoken style: Your Excellency
- Religious style: Monsignor
- Posthumous style: not applicable

John Jeremiah McRaith (December 6, 1934 – March 19, 2017) was an American prelate of the Roman Catholic Church. He served as bishop of the Diocese of Owensboro in Kentucky from 1982 to 2009.

== Biography ==
=== Early life ===
John McRaith was born on December 6, 1934, in Hutchinson, Minnesota to Arthur Luke McRaith and Marie (née Hanley) McRaith. He grew up on a farm in that community. McRaith attended St. John's Preparatory School in Collegeville, Minnesota, then went to Loras College and St. Bernard's Seminary, both in Dubuque, Iowa.

=== Priesthood ===
McRaith was ordained a priest for the Diocese of New Ulm at St. Mary's Church in Sleepy Eye, Minnesota, by Bishop Alphonse James Schladweiler on February 21, 1960. He served as chancellor and vicar general of the diocese, and as executive director of the National Catholic Rural Life Conference from 1971 to 1978.

=== Bishop of Owensboro ===
On October 23, 1982, McRaith was appointed the third bishop of Owensboro by Pope John Paul II. He received his episcopal consecration on December 15, 1982, at the Owensboro Sportscenter from Archbishop Thomas Kelly, with Bishops Henry Soenneker and Raymond Lucker serving as co-consecrators. McRaith established the diocesan newspaper, The Western Kentucky Catholic, in 1984.

Having grown up on a farm, McRaith was very interested in sustainable agriculture and the issues of rural life. He owned a farm where he grew vegetables and took visitors on hay rides. He led the Subcommittee on Food, Agriculture and Rural Concerns for the U.S. Conference of Catholic Bishops (USCCB) and testified to a US Senate committee on family farms in 1990.

At a 1992 USCCB meeting, the bishops adopted a McRaith proposal to create a task force to deal with the sexual abuse of minors by clergy. McRaith was a board member for Brescia University, the Daniel Pitino Shelter for the homeless and the McAuley Free Clinic, all in Owensboro, and the Lourdes Hospital Foundation in Paducah, Kentucky.

=== Retirement and legacy ===
On January 5, 2009, Pope Benedict XVI accepted McRaith's early retirement for health reasons as bishop of Owensboro. McRaith explained, "I do not have a life-threatening illness, but my doctors have advised me to slow down."

John McRaith died in Owensboro on March 19, 2017, at age 82.

Catholic Church titles
Preceded by Henry Joseph Soenneker	Bishop of Owensboro; 1982–2009	Succeeded by William Francis Medley
