= Justin Marks (baseball) =

American baseball player (born 1988)

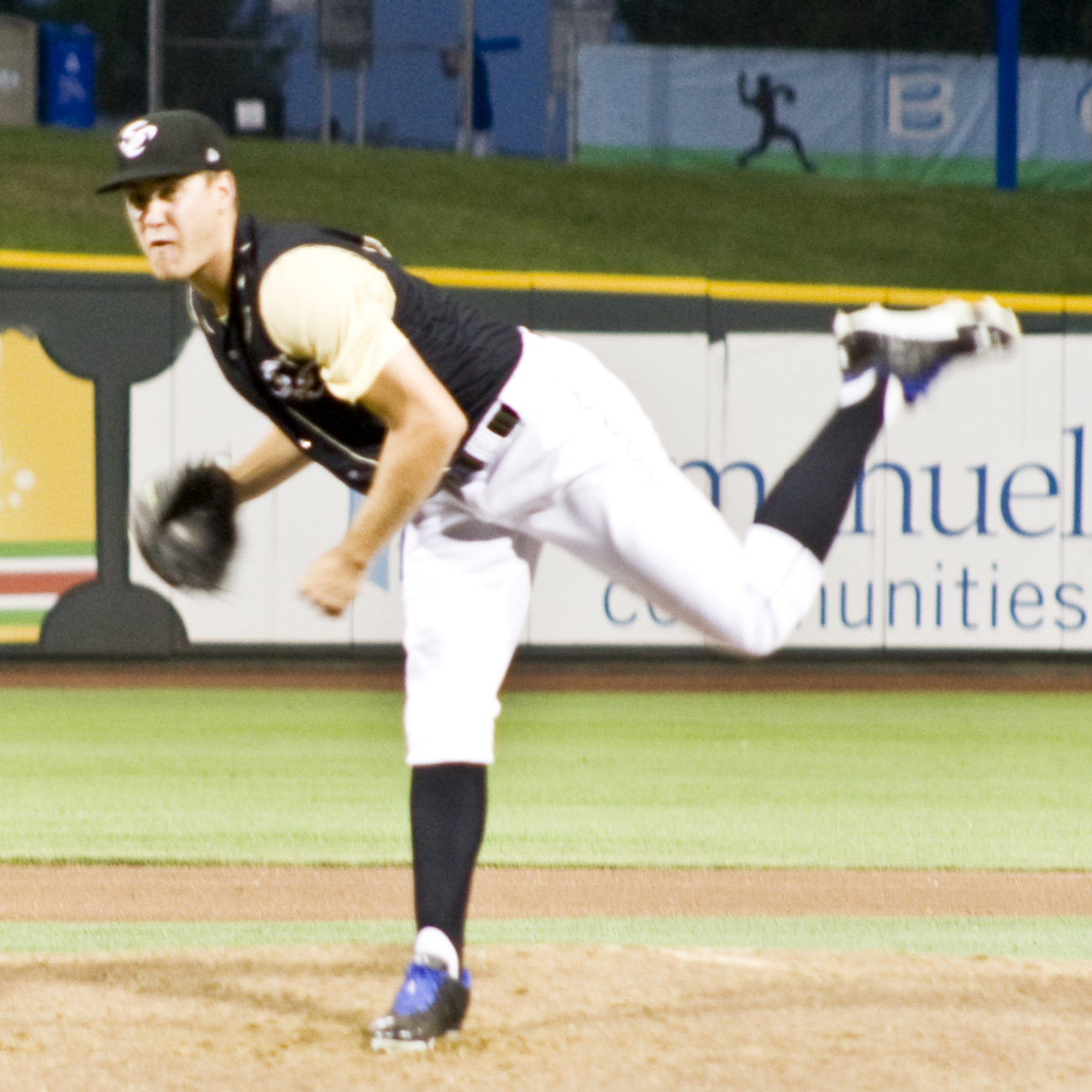
- Marks with the Omaha Storm Chasers
- Pitcher
- Born: January 12, 1988 (age 38); Owensboro, Kentucky, U.S.
- Batted: Left Threw: Left

MLB debut
- April 20, 2014, for the Kansas City Royals

Last MLB appearance
- May 5, 2017, for the Tampa Bay Rays

MLB statistics
- Win–loss record: 0–0
- Earned run average: 3.65
- Strikeouts: 9
- Stats at Baseball Reference

Teams
- Kansas City Royals (2014); Tampa Bay Rays (2016–2017)

Justin Michael Marks (born January 12, 1988) is an American former professional baseball pitcher. He played in Major League Baseball (MLB) from 2014 to 2017 with the Kansas City Royals and Tampa Bay Rays.

== Amateur career ==
The Boston Red Sox drafted Marks in the 37th round of the 2006 MLB draft out of Owensboro Catholic High School in Owensboro, Kentucky, but he did not sign, opting to attend the University of Louisville, where he played college baseball for the Louisville Cardinals. In 2008, he played collegiate summer baseball with the Chatham A's of the Cape Cod Baseball League.

== Professional career ==
=== Oakland Athletics ===
The Oakland Athletics selected Marks in the third round of the 2009 MLB draft, and he signed. Marks spent two years in the A's farm system.

=== Kansas City Royals ===
The Royals acquired Marks and Vin Mazzaro from the Athletics for David DeJesus. After the 2012 season, he appeared in the Arizona Fall League and was added to the Royals' 40-man roster. Marks was selected for the Top Prospects Team by the AFL coaches and managers. Marks led the Arizona league with five wins while pitching for the Surprise Saguaros. During the short six-week season he went 5–1 over seven starts and a 2.59 ERA with 22 strikeouts and five walks. Marks spent most of the 2012 regular season with the Northwest Arkansas Naturals of the Double–A Texas League. He posted a 3–5 record with the Naturals with an ERA of 3.80 in 17 starts. Marks' season was interrupted however after a ball hit back to the pitcher fractured his right orbital bone.

The Royals promoted Marks from the Omaha Storm Chasers of the Triple–A Pacific Coast League to the major leagues on April 17, 2014. He made his MLB debut with the Royals on April 20. Marks was designated for assignment by the Royals on June 2.

=== Oakland Athletics (second stint) ===
On June 6, 2014, Marks was traded to the Oakland Athletics in exchange for cash considerations and was sent to the Triple–A Sacramento River Cats. He made 4 scoreless appearances for Sacramento, logging 2 strikeouts in 3 2/3 innings pitched.

=== Texas Rangers ===
On June 20, 2014, Marks was claimed off waivers by the Texas Rangers after being outrighted off the A's 40–man roster. In 5 games for the Triple–A Round Rock Express, he logged a 5.06 ERA with 8 strikeouts across 5 1/3 innings pitched. Marks was released by the Rangers organization on July 25.

=== Arizona Diamondbacks ===
On November 13, 2014, Marks signed a minor league contract with the Arizona Diamondbacks organization. He spent the 2015 campaign with the Triple–A Reno Aces, compiling a 5–9 record and 5.63 ERA with 84 strikeouts over 108 2/3 innings pitched.

=== Tampa Bay Rays ===
The Tampa Bay Rays signed Marks to a minor league contract on January 19, 2016. On July 16, while with the Durham Bulls of the Triple–A International League, Marks pitched the first complete–game no-hitter in Bulls history. In 25 games (23 starts) for Durham, he compiled a 7–11 record and 3.86 ERA with 127 strikeouts across 140 innings pitched. On September 5, the Rays selected Marks' contract, adding him to their active roster. He made four appearances for the Rays, recording a 1.00 ERA with six strikeouts over nine innings pitched. Marks was removed from the 40–man roster and sent outright to Durham on October 11. He elected free agency following the season on November 7.

On December 22, 2016, Marks re–signed with the Rays organization on a new minor league contract.

=== Los Angeles Dodgers ===
On May 9, 2017, Marks was claimed off waivers by the Los Angeles Dodgers. He was designated for assignment on June 8. He accepted his outright assignment to the minors and pitched in 31 games (6 starts) for the Triple-A Oklahoma City Dodgers in 2017. He was 4–3 with a 5.25 ERA. He elected free agency on October 2, 2017.
