= Evelyn Mawuli =

Japanese basketball player (born 1995)

Evelyn Mawuli 馬瓜 エブリン
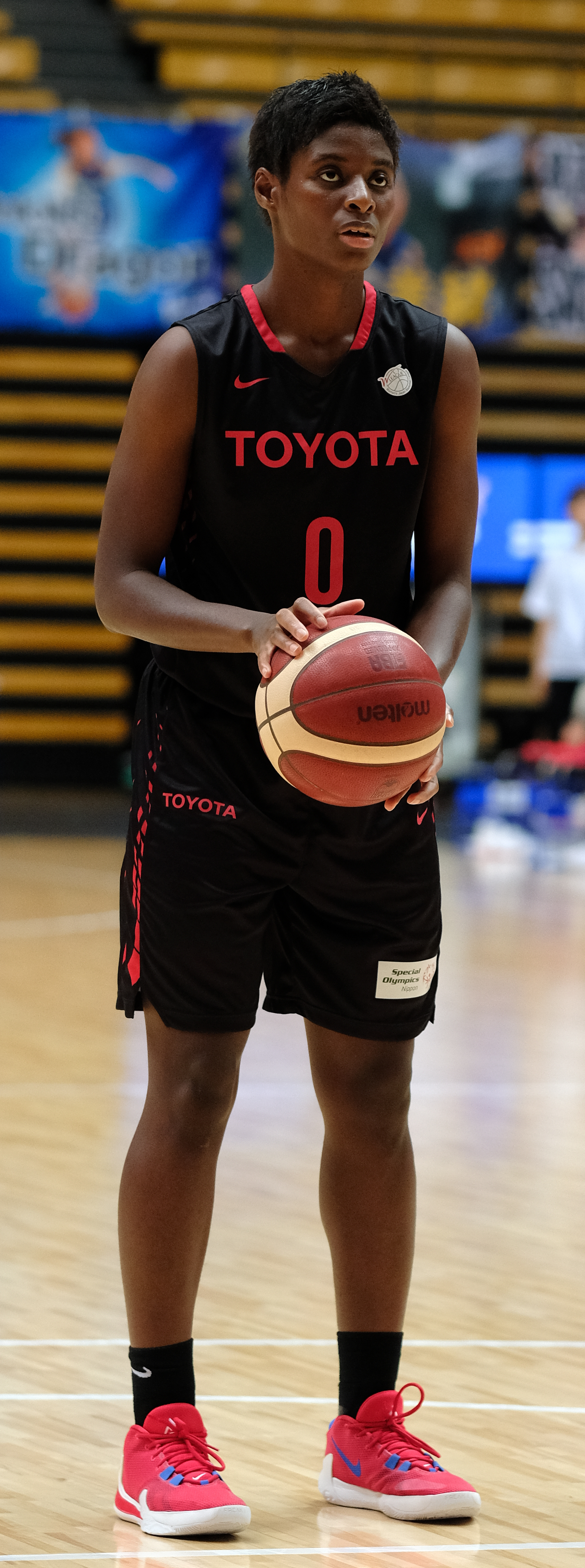
- Mawuli in 2019

No. 0 – Toyota Antelopes
- Position: Small forward
- League: JBL

Personal information
- Born: 2 June 1995 (age 31) Toyohashi, Aichi, Japan
- Listed height: 5 ft 11 in (1.80 m)
- Listed weight: 174 lb (79 kg)

Career information
- WNBA draft: 2017: undrafted
- Playing career: 2014–present

Career history
- 2014–2017: Aisin AW Wings
- 2017–present: Toyota Antelopes
Medals
Women's basketball
Representing Japan
Olympic Games
| Silver medal – second place | 2020 Tokyo | Team |
Asian Games
| Bronze medal – third place | 2014 Incheon | Team |
FIBA Asia Cup
| Gold medal – first place | 2017 India |
| Gold medal – first place | 2019 India |
FIBA Asia U16 Championship
| Gold medal – first place | 2011 China | Team |
| Silver medal – second place | 2009 India | Team |

Evelyn Mawuli (馬瓜 エブリン; born 2 June 1995) is a Japanese professional basketball player. She competed at the 2020 Summer Olympics, winning a silver medal. Evelyn was born to Ghanaian parents in Toyohashi, Aichi. At the age of 14, she naturalized along with her entire family to become a Japanese citizen, in order to represent Japan in international tournaments.

== Career ==
=== WJBL ===
Mawuli played for the Aisin AW Wings, a team based in Anjō, since the 2014–15 season where she made her professional debut. In 2017, Mawuli signed with the Nagoya-based, Toyota Antelopes for the 2017–18 season.

== National team ==
=== Youth level ===
Mawuli made her international debut at the 2009 FIBA Asia Under-16 Championship in India where Japan took home the silver medal. She was again named to the Under-16 team, for the 2011 FIBA Asia Under-16 Championship, where Japan won Gold. Mawuli was named to the team for the 2012 FIBA Under-17 World Championship in Amsterdam, Netherlands. Japan finished the tournament in fourth place and Mawuli was named to the All-Tournament Team.

=== Senior level ===
Mawuli made her debut with the senior national team, at the 2014 Asian Games where Japan placed in third, taking home the bronze. Mawuli was part of the gold medal winning Japanese team at the 2017 FIBA Women's Asia Cup in Bangalore, India. She also represented Japan in the following 2019 FIBA Women’s Asia Cup, again held in Bangalore, where Japan again came away with the gold medal.

Mawuli represented Japan during two olympics campaigns, playing in both the Olympic qualifying tournaments in Belgium in 2020, and Hungary in 2024, as well as the games themselves, in Tokyo 2020, and Paris 2024.
