= Francis Ridgley Cotton =

American Catholic prelate

His Excellency, The Most Reverend Francis Ridgley Cotton O.P
- Bishop of Owensboro
- Church: Roman Catholic Church
- See: Diocese of Owensboro
- In office: February 24, 1938 to September 25, 1960
- Successor: Henry Joseph Soenneker

Orders
- Ordination: June 17, 1920 by John T. McNicholas
- Consecration: February 24, 1938 by John A. Floersh

Personal details
- Born: September 19, 1895 Bardstown, Kentucky, US
- Died: September 25, 1960 (aged 65) Owensboro, Kentucky, US
- Education: St. Meinrad Seminary; St. Mary's Seminary; Catholic University of America; Pontifical Roman Athenaeum S. Apollinare
- Motto: Disce a Jesu (Learn from Jesus)

Francis Ridgley Cotton O.P. (September 19, 1895—September 25, 1960) was an American prelate of the Roman Catholic Church. He served as the first bishop of the new Diocese of Owensboro in Kentucky from 1938 to 1960. Cotton was a member of the Order of Friars Preachers (Dominicans)

== Biography ==
=== Early life ===
One of three children, Francis Cotton was born on September 19, 1895, in Bardstown, Kentucky to Charles and Mary (née Moore) Cotton. After attending St. Meinrad Seminary in St. Meinrad, Indiana, he enrolled in St. Mary's Seminary in Baltimore, Maryland. Cotton then went in 1919 to Washington D.C. to enter the Sulpician Seminary at the Catholic University of America, finishing there in 1920.

=== Priesthood ===
Cotton was ordained to the priesthood in Washington for the Diocese of Louisville by Archbishop John Timothy McNicholas on June 17, 1920. After his ordination, Cotton completed his graduate studies at the Pontifical Athenaeum S. Apollinare in Rome. Following his return to Kentucky, the diocese assigned him as a curate at St. Joseph Proto-Cathedral Parish in Bardstown, St. Cecilia Parish in Louisville, Kentucky, and at St. Francis de Sales Parish in Paducah, Kentucky (1922–1926). Cotton was appointed assistant chancellor of the diocese in 1926, then chancellor in 1931.

=== Bishop of Owensboro ===
On December 16, 1937, Cotton was appointed the first bishop of the newly erected Diocese of Owensboro by Pope Pius XI. He received his episcopal consecration at the Cathedral of the Assumption in Louisville, Kentucky, on February 24, 1938, from Archbishop John A. Floersh, with Bishops Theodore H. Reverman and Moses E. Kiley serving as co-consecrators. After his consecration, Cotton embarked on visits to the parishes in the new diocese. He brought the Catholic Students' Mission Crusade, a national organization for helping the poor, to the diocese.

In early 1940, Cotton began the collection of relief supplies for refugees from World War II in Europe. By 1942, the diocese had collected over $1 million in supplies for distribution in Europe and China. In February 1943, Cotton held a synod in the diocese to set its laws and constitution. Contemporary reports said that Cotton strictly enforced these rules in the diocese, but personally was a kind individual.

=== Death ===
Francis Cotton died of a heart attack in Owensboro on September 25, 1960, at age 65.

== Episcopal succession ==
Catholic Church titles
Preceded by none	Bishop of Owensboro; 1937—1960	Succeeded by Henry Joseph Soenneker
