= Chris Brown (defensive back) =

American football player (born 1962)

No. 23
- Position: Defensive back

Personal information
- Born: April 11, 1962 (age 64); Owensboro, Kentucky, U.S.
- Listed height: 6 ft 0 in (1.83 m)
- Listed weight: 200 lb (91 kg)

Career information
- High school: Owensboro Catholic
- College: Notre Dame
- NFL draft: 1984: 6th round, 164th overall pick

Career history
- Pittsburgh Steelers (1984–1985); Houston Oilers (1986)*
- * Offseason or practice squad member only

Career NFL statistics
- Interceptions: 1
- Fumble recoveries: 1
- Stats at Pro Football Reference

Christopher Duke Brown (born April 11, 1962) is an American former professional football player who was a defensive back in the National Football League (NFL). He played for the Pittsburgh Steelers in the 1984 and 1985 seasons. He played college football for the Notre Dame Fighting Irish and was selected 164th overall by the Steelers in the sixth round of the 1984 NFL draft.
