= Tiana Mangakahia =

Australian basketball player (1995–2025)

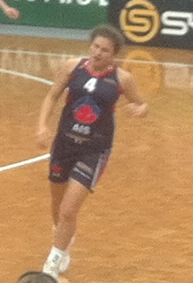
- Mangakahia with the AIS in 2012

Personal information
- Born: 21 April 1995 Meadowbrook, Queensland, Australia
- Died: 11 September 2025 (aged 30) Brisbane, Queensland, Australia
- Listed height: 166 cm (5 ft 5 in)

Career information
- High school: Brisbane State (Brisbane, Queensland); Lake Ginninderra (Canberra, ACT)
- College: Syracuse (2017–2021)
- WNBA draft: 2021: undrafted
- Playing career: 2011–2023; 2025
- Position: Guard

Career history
- 2011: Brisbane Spartans
- 2011–2012: Australian Institute of Sport
- 2013–2014: Townsville Fire
- 2014: Brisbane Spartans
- 2021–2023: Northside Wizards
- 2021–2022: Dynamo Moscow
- 2022–2023: Sydney Flames
- 2023: Toulouse Métropole Basket
- 2025: Southern Districts Spartans

Career highlights
- SEABL champion (2014); NBL1 North MVP (2022); NBL1 North All-Star Five (2022); 2× First-team All-ACC (2018, 2019)
- Stats at Basketball Reference
Medals
Representing Australia
Women's basketball
FIBA Asia Cup
Bronze medal – third place	2021 Jordan
FIBA U-19 World Championship
Bronze medal – third place	2013 Lithuania	Team
FIBA U-18 Oceania Championship
Gold medal – first place	2012 New Zealand	Team
FIBA U-16 Oceania Championship
Gold medal – first place	2011 Australia	Team

Tiana Cynthia Mangakahia (21 April 1995 – 11 September 2025) was an Australian basketball player. She began her career with two seasons in the Women's National Basketball League (WNBL) before playing college basketball in the United States for Syracuse University between 2017 and 2021. After a season in Russia, Mangakahia returned to the WNBL in 2022 and moved to play in France in 2023, but then retired due to breast cancer. She came out of retirement in April 2025, but died after her health deteriorated dramatically in September 2025 as a result of the cancer.

== Early life ==
Tiana Cynthia Mangakahia was born in Meadowbrook, Queensland, on 21 April 1995, to father Terei, a Māori who emigrated from New Zealand to Australia in his late teens, and mother Cynthia from Queensland. Mangakahia grew up with five brothers, four older and one younger. In a 2020 story, ESPN journalist Aishwarya Kumar described the young Mangakahia as "a daredevil", regularly climbing a tall pole in the family's backyard and competing in various sports and games alongside her brothers. Her older brothers all played basketball, and she was first enrolled in a basketball camp with them. Mangakahia quickly took to the sport, with Kumar noting that "Even at age 8, when she was the smallest girl on the team, she'd run and pass the ball like a ninja, nimble and fast." At age 9, she was asked to play on her club's 12-and-under team, but her mother vetoed the move. In the Kumar piece, Mangakahia herself recalled, "I think that actually helped me so much, because you never know. What if I played [up] and just sat on the bench the whole time? I probably would've not enjoyed basketball."

Mangakahia played basketball as a junior for the Southern Districts Spartans. She accepted a scholarship at Brisbane State High School in Brisbane. While in Canberra at the Australian Institute of Sport (AIS), she attended Lake Ginninderra Secondary College.

== Basketball career ==
=== Early years ===
Mangakahia debuted in the South East Australian Basketball League (SEABL) in 2011 with the Brisbane Spartans. She made her debut in the Women's National Basketball League (WNBL) in 2011–12 with the Australian Institute of Sport.

Mangakahia's next stint came in the 2013–14 WNBL season with the Townsville Fire. She then returned to the Brisbane Spartans for the 2014 SEABL season and helped the team win the championship. She was on the roster again for the Spartans in 2015, but she did not play in any games.

=== College ===
Between 2015 and 2017, Mangakahia attended Hutchinson Community College in the United States but did not play basketball.

In 2017, Mangakahia joined Syracuse University.

In the 2017–18 season, Mangakahia averaged 17.5 points, 9.8 assists, and 3.8 rebounds per game for the Orange. On 24 November 2017, she had 17 assists against Vanderbilt, breaking the Syracuse single-game assists record. She had a career-high eight steals against UNLV on 22 December and scored a season-high 44 points against Georgia Tech on 4 January. She subsequently earned first-team All-ACC honours.

She emerged as a star in her second season at Syracuse in 2018–19, averaging 16.9 points, 8.4 assists, and 4.9 rebounds while leading the Orange to a 25–9 record and a No. 3 seed, the program's highest ever, in the NCAA tournament, earning first-team All-ACC honours and All-America honourable mention. She had the first points-rebounds-assists triple-double in program history against UNC with 34 points, 10 rebounds, and 10 assists on 13 January 2019. She tied her career high with 44 points against Florida State on 28 February and had a season-high 15 assists against Niagara on 17 December. In her first two seasons at Syracuse, Mangakahia broke the school's career record for assists and joined the team's 1,000-point club.

In June 2019, Mangakahia discovered a lump on her left breast while showering. The lump grew in the following two weeks, and she was diagnosed with invasive ductal carcinoma. While her father urged her to return to Australia for treatment, she decided to remain at Syracuse, with Orange head coach Quentin Hillsman promising to support her throughout her treatment. At least one of her family members travelled to Syracuse to accompany her during each of her chemotherapy sessions. When she lost her hair during her treatment, she initially wore wigs, but decided to show her bald head during her treatment; all of her brothers shaved their heads bald in solidarity with her. Eventually, Mangakahia underwent a double mastectomy followed by reconstructive surgery to improve her post-operative appearance, and was declared cancer-free shortly after the surgery. She was cleared to return to practice in late February 2020, near the end of the 2019–20 season. That October, Mangakahia received an eligibility waiver from the NCAA that allowed her to play at Syracuse in 2020–21.

In 20 games in the 2020–21 season, Mangakahia averaged 11.4 points, 3.1 rebounds, 7.3 assists and 1.5 steals per game. She subsequently earned All-ACC Honorable Mention.

=== Post-college ===
After going undrafted in the 2021 WNBA draft, Mangakahia spent training camp with the Phoenix Mercury. She then returned to Australia and joined the Northside Wizards in the NBL1 North. In nine games for the Wizards during the 2021 NBL1 season, she averaged 18.4 points, 4.6 rebounds, 5.7 assists and 1.7 steals per game.

For the 2021–22 season, Mangakahia moved to Russia to play for Dynamo Moscow of the Russian Women's Premier League. In 16 games, she averaged 14.3 points, 4.3 rebounds, 7.3 assists and 1.5 steals per game.

Mangakahia returned to the Northside Wizards for the 2022 NBL1 North season and averaged 27.3 points, 6.6 rebounds, 7.5 assists and 3.9 steals in 20 games. She was named NBL1 North MVP and All-Star Five in 2022.

Mangakahia joined the Sydney Flames for the 2022–23 WNBL season. In 20 games, she averaged 13.1 points, 3.8 rebounds, 3.6 assists and 2.2 steals per game.

After a one-game stint with the Northside Wizards on 25 March 2023, Mangakahia moved to France where she played five games for Toulouse Métropole Basket to finish the 2022–23 season.

On 5 June 2023, Mangakahia announced her retirement after being diagnosed with stage IV breast cancer which had spread into other areas of her body.

In April 2025, Mangakahia came out of retirement to join the Southern Districts Spartans for the 2025 NBL1 North season. She was a member of the Spartans' grand final team, but did not play in the three-game losing series to the Logan Thunder. In 13 games, she averaged 12.08 points, 2.15 rebounds, 3.54 assists and 2.15 steals per game.

Mangakahia had signed to play in New Zealand with the Tokomanawa Queens in the 2025 Tauihi Basketball Aotearoa season, but her health deteriorated dramatically in the weeks following the 2025 NBL1 season.

=== National team ===
==== Youth level ====
Mangakahia made her international debut for the Sapphires at the 2011 FIBA Oceania Under-16 Championship in Canberra, Australia. She would once again represent the Sapphires at the 2012 Under-17 World Championship in Amsterdam, Netherlands, where Australia placed fifth. Mangakahia would then make her debut for the Gems at the FIBA Oceania Under-18 Championship, where she took home gold. She would then go on to represent the Gems at the Under-19 World Championship in Lithuania the following year, where they finished in third place and took home the bronze medal.

==== Senior level ====
In April 2019, coming off a breakout season at Syracuse, Mangakahia was named to the Opals' preliminary roster for the 2020 Summer Olympics, but was forced to bow out due to a cancer diagnosis. In July 2020, she was selected again to the Australian senior women's national team. In May 2021, she missed the women's team roster ahead of the Tokyo Olympics, which was postponed to 2021 due to the COVID-19 pandemic in Japan.

== Career statistics ==
Legend
GP	Games played	GS	Games started	MPG	Minutes per game	FG%	Field goal percentage
3P%	3-point field goal percentage	FT%	Free throw percentage	RPG	Rebounds per game	APG	Assists per game
SPG	Steals per game	BPG	Blocks per game	TO	Turnovers per game	PPG	Points per game
**Bold**	Career high	*	Led Division I

=== College ===
Year	Team	GP	GS	MPG	FG%	3P%	FT%	RPG	APG	SPG	BPG	TO	PPG
2017–18	Syracuse	31	30	**34.1**	42.6	28.9	87.5	3.8	**9.8**	**2.5**	0.0	5.7	**17.5**
2018–19	Syracuse	**34**	**34**	31.3	**44.5**	**37.1**	**88.2**	**4.9**	8.4	2.2	**0.1**	**3.9**	16.9
2019–20	Syracuse	Did not play due to injury											
2020–21	Syracuse	20	20	32.4	42.5	34.4	84.2	3.1	7.3*	1.5	**0.1**	4.8	11.4
**Career**		85	84	32.6	43.4	33.3	87.3	4.1	8.7	2.2	0.0	4.8	15.8
Statistics retrieved from Sports-Reference.

== Personal life ==
Mangakahia was a Latter-day Saint.

=== Illness and death ===
In 2023, Mangakahia's breast cancer had returned, diagnosed at stage IV, and it had metastasised. On 4 September 2025, Mangakahia announced that she was "experiencing significant physical decline" after the cancer had progressed. She died one week later, on 11 September in Brisbane, at the age of 30.

== See also ==
- List of basketball players who died during their careers
