= William Medley =

American Catholic prelate (born 1952)

His Excellency, The Most Reverend William Medley
- Bishop of Owensboro
- Diocese: Owensboro
- Appointed: December 15, 2009
- Installed: February 10, 2010
- Predecessor: John Jeremiah McRaith

Orders
- Ordination: May 22, 1982 by Thomas C. Kelly
- Consecration: February 10, 2010 by Joseph Edward Kurtz, Thomas C. Kelly, and John Jeremiah McRaith

Personal details
- Born: September 17, 1952 (age 73) Loretto, Kentucky, US
- Education: Bellarmine College; St. Meinrad School of Theology
- Motto: Holy is God's name
- Styles
- Reference style: His Excellency; The Most Reverend
- Spoken style: Your Excellency
- Religious style: Bishop

William Francis Medley (born September 17, 1952) is an American Catholic prelate serving as Bishop of Owensboro in Kentucky since 2010. He was ordained a priest of the Archdiocese of Louisville in 1982.

== Biography ==
=== Early life and education ===
Medley was born on September 17, 1952, in Loretto, Kentucky, to James Werner and Dorothy (née Hayden) Medley. Following his graduation from St. Thomas Seminary High School in Louisville, he studied at Bellarmine College in Louisville. Medley received a Bachelor of Arts degree in philosophy and psychology from Bellarmine.

Medley then entered the Saint Meinrad School of Theology in Indiana, where he received a Master of Divinity degree. From 1974 to 1978, he served as a social worker for the Kentucky Department of Human Resources.

=== Ordination and ministry ===
On May 22, 1982, Medley was ordained to the priesthood for the Archdiocese of Louisville at the Cathedral of the Assumption by Archbishop Thomas C. Kelly. He then served as associate pastor at St. Pius X Parish and as chaplain at Assumption High School in Louisville. In 1985, Medley became associate pastor at the Cathedral of the Assumption Parish in Louisville.

In 1988, Medley was named administrator of St. Benedict Parish, St. Charles Borromeo Parish, and Holy Cross Parish, all merged to form St. Martin de Porres Parish in 1990. He became director of the Office of Clergy Personnel in 1989, and served as rector of St. Joseph Proto-Cathedral (the original seat of the Archdiocese of Louisville) from 1993 to 2005. During Medley's tenure as rector, St. Joseph was elevated to the rank of a basilica and had its sanctuary renovated.

Medley was named pastor of Mother of Good Counsel Parish in Louisville in 2005, and of Transfiguration of Our Lord Parish in Goshen, Kentucky, in 2007. In 2008, these two parishes were merged to form St. Bernadette Parish in Prospect, Kentucky, with Medley remaining as pastor. In addition to his pastoral duties, Medley also served as a member of the College of Consultors, the Priests' Council, the Planning Commission, the Priests' Health Panel, and the Priests' Personnel Board. He also served as president of the Bardstown/Nelson County Ministerial Association and on the Nelson County Human Rights Commission.

=== Bishop of Owensboro ===
On December 15, 2009, Medley was appointed as the fourth bishop of Owensboro by Pope Benedict XVI.His episcopal consecration by Archbishop Joseph Kurtz took place on February 10, 2010, at the Owensboro Sports Center in Owensboro. He selected as his episcopal motto: "Holy Is God's Name."

In March 2019, Spaulding suspended Edward Bradley, a retired priest in the diocese serving as a Catholic high school chaplain, over allegations he abused two minors during the 1980s. On April 21, 2012, the Congregation for the Doctrine of the Faith in Rome re-instated Bradley, but with prohibitions on entering a school for the next five years. On October 9, 2018, Medley released a list of 27 priests from the diocese with 66 sexual abuse claims since 1937.

In June 2019, the Survivors Network of those Abused by Priests (SNAP) filed a formal complaint against Medley. SNAP claimed that while serving as personnel director for the Diocese of Louisville, Medley facilitated the transfer of a priest credibly accused of sexual misconduct to a parish where the number of children was expected to be fewer in number. In response, the diocese of Owensboro released this statement:

“Bishop William F. Medley has previously met with Mr. Montgomery and is aware of the concerns raised regarding his position as clergy personnel director from 1989-1993 in the Archdiocese of Louisville. At this time Bishop Medley has not received any directives from the Papal Nuncio in regards to this matter. At last week’s meeting of the United States Conference of Catholic Bishops (USCCB), the bishops adopted new protocols for reporting concerns such as these. Bishop Medley awaits further direction.”

Catholic Church titles
Preceded by John Jeremiah McRaith	Bishop of Owensboro; 2009–present	Succeeded by Incumbent
