= Hind Ben Abdelkader =

Belgian basketball player (born 1995)

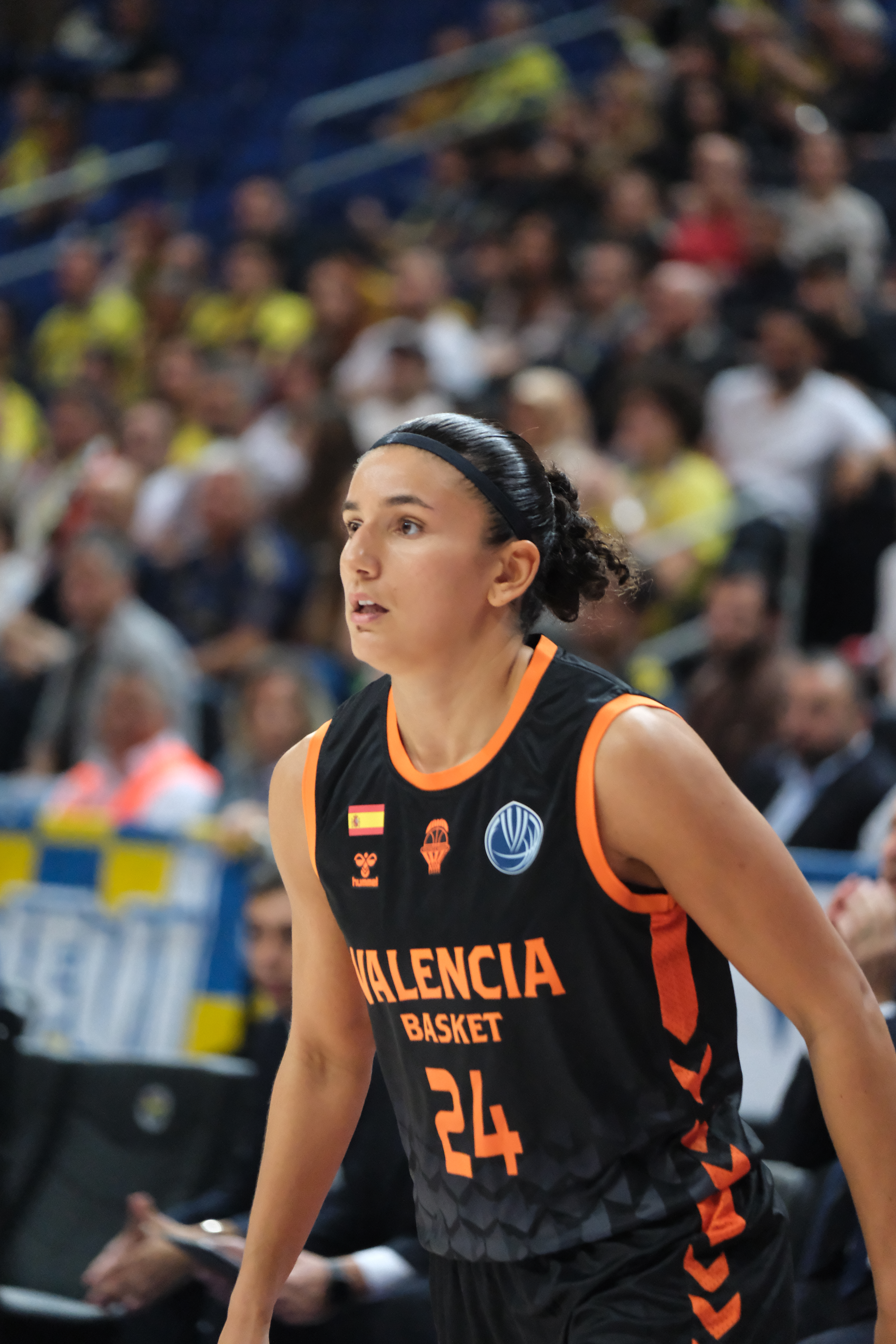

Free agent
- Position: Guard

Personal information
- Born: July 21, 1995 (age 31) Brussels, Belgium
- Listed height: 5 ft 8 in (1.73 m)
- Listed weight: 148 lb (67 kg)

Career information
- College: California (2013–2014)
- WNBA draft: 2017: undrafted
- Playing career: 2012–present

Career history
- 2012–2014: Sint-Katelijne-Waver
- 2014–2015: Cadí La Seu
- 2015–2016: Cavigal Nice Basket 06
- 2016–2017: Wisła Can-Pack Kraków
- 2017–2021: Hatayspor
- 2018: Indiana Fever
- 2021–2022: Nika Syktyvkar
- 2022–2023: ESB Villeneuve-d'Ascq
- 2023–2024: Galatasaray
- Stats at Basketball Reference
Medals
Women's 3x3 basketball
Representing Belgium
FIBA Europe 3x3 Championships
Bronze medal – third place	2014 Bucharest	Team

Hind Ben Abdelkader (born July 21, 1995) is a Belgian professional basketball player who plays for the Galatasaray in the Turkish Women's Basketball League. She is also a member of the Belgium women's national basketball team.

== Professional career ==
=== WNBA ===
Ben Abdelkader went undrafted in the 2017 WNBA draft. She was signed by the Indiana Fever in 2018 to a training camp contract and made the opening day roster. Ben Abdelkader was waived by the Fever in July, when they signed veteran guard Cappie Pondexter.

She made another attempt at the WNBA in 2019 when she signed a training camp contract with the Chicago Sky. She didn't make the final squad, as she was waived at the end of training camp.

=== Overseas ===
==== Galatasaray ====
On 21 July 2023, she signed with Galatasaray of the Turkish Women's Basketball Super League (TKBL).

== WNBA career statistics ==
Legend
GP	Games played	GS	Games started	MPG	Minutes per game	RPG	Rebounds per game
APG	Assists per game	SPG	Steals per game	BPG	Blocks per game	PPG	Points per game
TO	Turnovers per game	FG%	Field-goal percentage	3P%	3-point field-goal percentage	FT%	Free-throw percentage
**Bold**	Career best	°	League leader

=== Regular season ===
Year	Team	GP	GS	MPG	FG%	3P%	FT%	RPG	APG	SPG	BPG	TO	PPG
2018	Indiana	14	0	10.1	.186	.207	.875	1.0	0.8	0.3	0.1	0.9	2.1
Career	1 year, 1 team	14	0	10.1	.186	.207	.875	1.0	0.8	0.3	0.1	0.9	2.1

== College career ==
Ben Abdelkader decided to join the California Golden Bears women's basketball team for the 2013-2014 season. During February of her freshman season, Ben Abdelkader announced she was leaving California and returning to Belgium.
