= Sporthallen Zuid =

Coordinates: 52.3396°N 4.8542°E

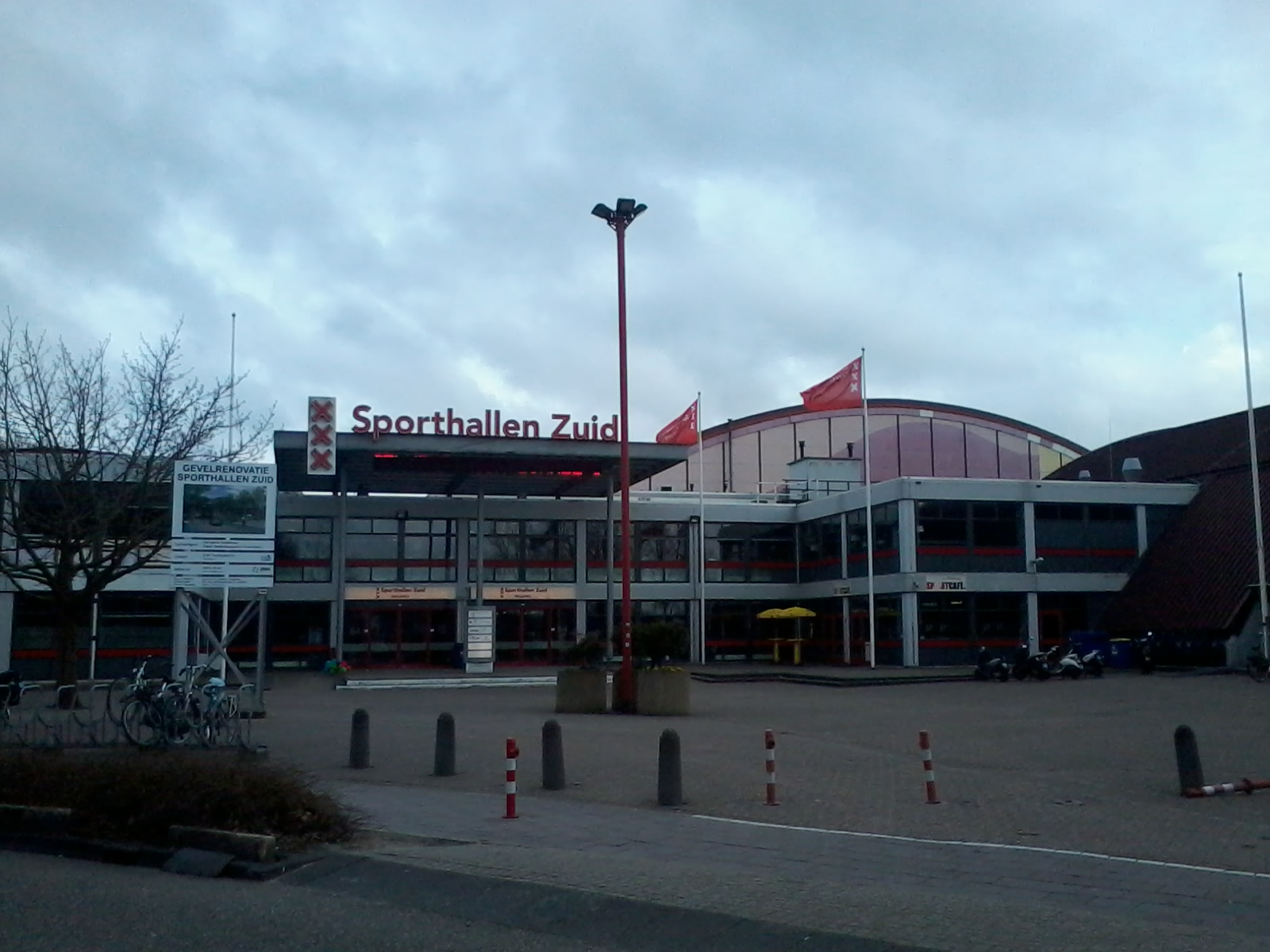
The complex in 2013.

Sporthallen Zuid is a multi-purpose indoor sports complex in Amsterdam, Netherlands.

== History ==
Opened in 1975, it is one of the largest indoor sports venues in the city and has hosted numerous national and international sporting events.

The arena was one of the venues for the 1998 European Women's Handball Championship.
