= Elisa Penna =

Italian basketball player

No. 41 – Reyer Venezia Mestre
- Position: Power forward
- League: Lega Basket Femminile

Personal information
- Born: 13 November 1995 (age 31) Bergamo, Italy
- Listed height: 1.88 m (6 ft 2 in)

Career information
- College: Wake Forest (2015–2019)
- WNBA draft: 2019: undrafted

Career history
- 2019–present: Reyer Venezia Mestre

Elisa Penna (born 13 November 1995) is an Italian basketball player for the Reyer Venezia Mestre women's team and the Italian national team. She played for Wake Forest University and her Demon Deacon career was ended prematurely in early 2019 by a knee injury.

She participated at the EuroBasket Women 2017.

== Wake Forest statistics ==
Ratios
Year	Team	GP	FG%	3P%	FT%	RBG	APG	BPG	SPG	PPG
2015-16	Wake Forest	22	36.5%	37.5%	84.8%	6.59	1.68	0.27	0.86	9.86
2016-17	Wake Forest	32	37.2%	34.6%	75.6%	5.72	1.94	0.47	1.09	13.41
2017-18	Wake Forest	25	38.3%	35.8%	81.6%	4.48	1.44	0.28	1.24	15.76
2018-19	Wake Forest	15	34.3%	29.8%	85.7%	5.60	1.93	0.13	1.47	15.27
Career		94	36.9%	34.3%	81.4%	5.57	1.74	0.32	1.14	13.50

Totals
Year	Team	GP	FG	FGA	3P	3PA	FT	FTA	REB	A	BK	ST	PTS
2015-16	Wake Forest	22	77	211	24	64	39	46	145	37	6	19	217
2016-17	Wake Forest	32	163	438	44	127	59	78	183	62	15	35	429
2017-18	Wake Forest	25	139	363	54	151	62	76	112	36	7	31	394
2018-19	Wake Forest	15	72	210	31	104	54	63	84	29	2	22	229
Career		94	451	1222	153	446	214	263	524	164	30	107	1269
