= Linnae Harper =

American basketball player (born 1995)

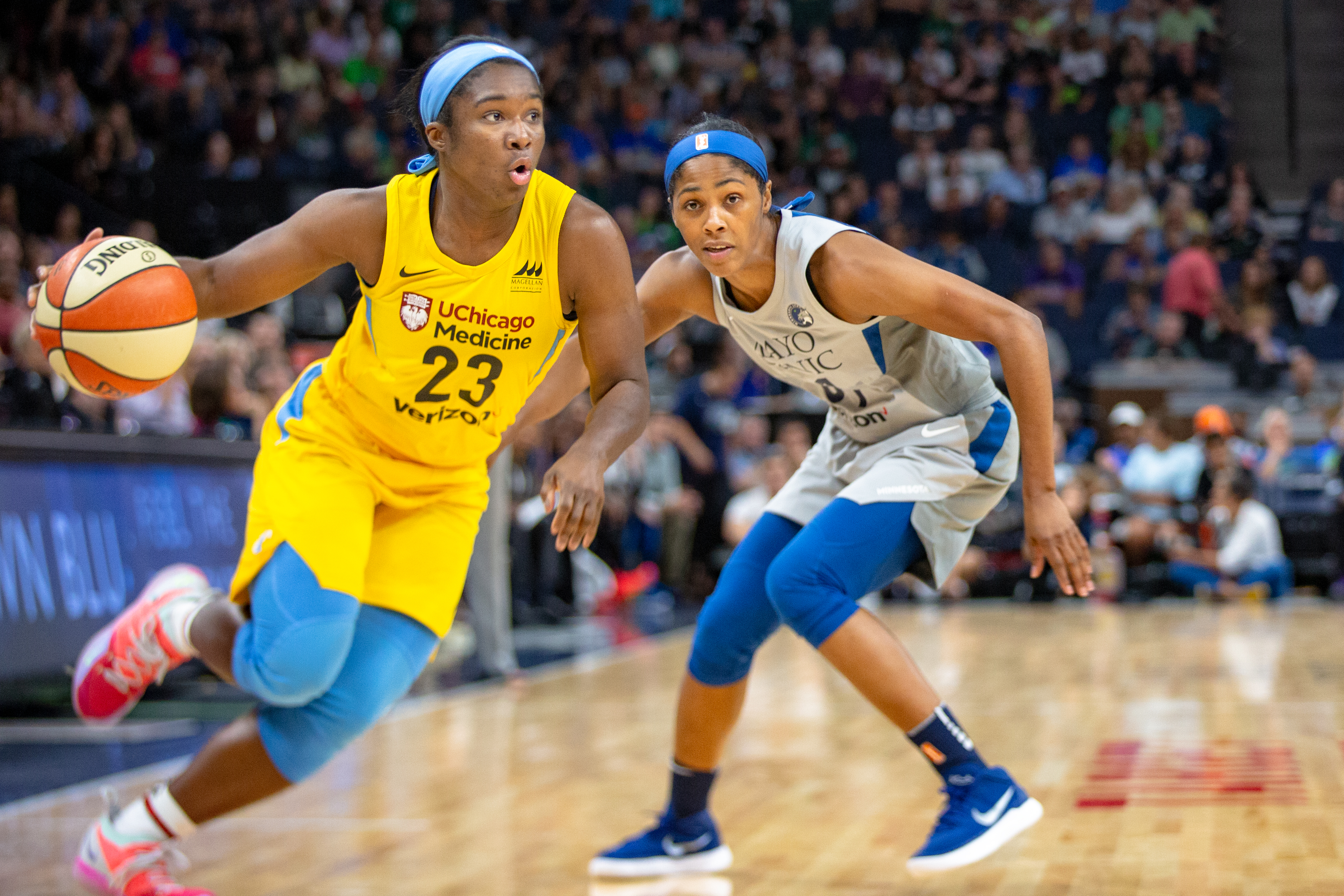
- Linnae Harper (left) and Sydney Colson (right)

Personal information
- Born: January 31, 1995 (age 31) Chicago, Illinois, U.S.
- Listed height: 5 ft 7 in (1.70 m)
- Listed weight: 160 lb (73 kg)

Career information
- High school: Whitney M. Young (Chicago, Illinois)
- College: Kentucky (2013–2015); Ohio State (2016–2018)
- WNBA draft: 2018: undrafted
- Playing career: 2018–present
- Position: Point guard

Career history
- 2018–2020: Chicago Sky
- 2021: Minnesota Lynx
- 2023: Washington Mystics

Career highlights
- Big Ten All-Defensive Team (2018); Big Ten Sixth Player of the Year (2017); SEC All-Defensive Team (2015); SEC All-Freshman Team (2014); McDonald's All-American (2013)
- Stats at Basketball Reference
Medals
Representing the United States
Women's basketball
Pan American Games
Silver medal – second place	2015 Toronto	Team
FIBA Under-19 World Cup
Gold medal – first place	2013 Lithuania	Team
FIBA Under-17 World Cup
Gold medal – first place	2012 Netherlands	Team
FIBA Americas Under-16 Championship
Gold medal – first place	2011 Mexico	Team
3x3 basketball
World Cup
Gold medal – first place	2023 Vienna	Team
Bronze medal – third place	2016 China	Team

Linnae Chanel Harper (born January 31, 1995) is an American professional basketball player. She completed her college education at Ohio State University. She completed her high school education at Whitney M. Young High School in Chicago, Illinois. She has played on seven USA Basketball teams in Americas and world competition.

== Early life ==
Harper was born on January 31, 1995, to Ericka Harper and Xavier Treadwell.

== High school career ==
Harper played for Whitney M. Young High School for four years, winning the city title each year, and the Class 4A state championship in 2012. She was named a WBCA All-American and participated in the 2013 WBCA High School All-America Game where she scored 8 points. She was also named a McDonald's All-American, and played in the McDonald's All-American game.

== USA Basketball ==
=== 3x3 U18 2011 ===
The inaugural 3x3 U18 World Championship was held in 2011. The event, originally called the Youth World Championship, was held in Rimini, Italy. Harper was named to the team, along with teammates Kaela Davis, Rebecca Greenwell, and Taya Reimer. The team won their first three matches easily, reaching 21 points before their opponent reached double-digits. Taya Reimer suffered an ankle injury in the game against Guam, and was unable to play in the remainder of the competition. Despite playing with three players, the USA team beat Italy by a score of 16–13. On the second day, the three remaining players won their first two games, then managed to beat the Czech Republic in two overtimes. They were now 7–0, and qualified for the medal rounds.

The semi-final was a rematch of the game against Italy. Less than two minutes into the game, Greenwell injured her knee and was unable to continue. The USA team played on, now playing with just two players against three. Despite that, they managed to take the game to overtime, where they lost 21–19. This left them scheduled to play Japan for the bronze medal, but with only two players, the team forfeited due to injury. Officially, the USA team finished fourth, but FIBA awarded the team an honorary bronze medal.

=== U16 Americas 2011 ===
Harper was named to the USA Basketball U16 team, which competed in the Second FIBA Americas U16 Championship in 2011, held in Mérida, Mexico. The team won all five contests, with an average margin of victory of 43 points per game. The win secured the gold medal for the competition, as well as an automatic bid to the Second FIBA U17 World Championship For Women – 2012 held in Amsterdam. Harper started all five games, averaging 9.6 points per game and leading the team in steals with 17.

=== U17 World 2012 ===
Harper continued with the team as the U16 team became the U17 team and competed in the world championship event held in Amsterdam. The USA team won all eight contests to win the world championship and the gold medal for the event. In the opening game against South Korea, Harper recorded five steals, at the time, a USA U17 record. In the game against Belgium, she recorded seven steals to set a new record. She was seven for seven from the free throw line in the game against Italy, tying a team record for free throw percentage. Harper played in all eight contests and averaged 7.9 points per game. She was named to the five-player all-tournament team.

=== U19 team 2013 ===
Harper was named to the USA Basketball U19 team, coached by Katie Meier, the head coach of the University of Miami. Among Plum's teammates were Moriah Jefferson and Breanna Stewart. Harper competed on behalf of the US at the Tenth FIBA U19 World Championship, held in Klaipėda and Panevežys, Lithuania, in July 2013. The team won all nine games, with a winning margin averaging 43 points per game. Harper scored 8.4 points per game and recorded 18 steals, only one fewer than team leader Morgan Tuck.

=== Pan Am 2015 ===
Harper was a member of the USA Women's Pan American Team which participated in basketball at the 2015 Pan American Games held in Toronto, Ontario, Canada July 10 to 26, 2015. The USA opened preliminary play with a game against Brazil. Although they opened up a 16-point lead in the second quarter Brazil came back, going on a 14–0 run to take a two-point lead in the third quarter. The USA responded with an 11–2 run with foul shot contributions by Jefferson and a three-point basket from Stewart. The USA ended up winning the close game 75–69.

The second game was against the Dominican Republic. The USA scored the first eight points and was never threatened. The USA won 94–55. Kelsey Plum led the team with five assists. The final preliminary game USA played Puerto Rico. USA led by only three points at the end of the third quarter, largely due to the play of Carla Cortijo Sanchez who scored 24 points, but left with an injury late in the game. After the injury the US extended the lead to 18 points and ended up with a 93–77 win, good for first place in their group.

In the semifinal game, Cuba led the US by as many as 14 points in the third quarter. The USA battled back and took a late lead. With under eight seconds to go, the USA was down by one point while Cuba had the ball. Harper stole the ball and made two free throws to give the USA the lead. Cuba missed its final shot to give the USA the win 65–64, propelling them into the gold-medal game against Canada.

The gold-medal game matched up the host team Canada against USA, in a sold-out arena dominated by fans in red and white and waving the Canadian flag. The Canadian team, arm in arm, sang Oh Canada as the respective national anthems were played.

After trading baskets early, the US edged out to a double-digit lead in the second quarter. However the Canadians, spurred on by the home crowd cheering, fought back and tied up the game at halftime. In the third quarter, it was Canada's time to shine as they outscored the US 26–15. The lead would reach as high as 18 points. The USA would fight back, but not all the way and Canada won the game and the gold-medal 81–73. It was Canada's first gold-medal in basketball in the Pan Am games. Nurse was the star for Canada with 33 points, hitting 11 of her 12 free-throw attempts and 10 of her 17 field-goal attempts including two of three three-pointers.

=== 3x3 World Cup 2016 ===
Harper was named to the USA 3x3 national team which competed in the twenty sixteen World Cup held in Guangzhou, China, October 11–15, 2016. Her teammates were Alexis Jennings, Natalie Romeo, and Chatrice White. On the opening day Harper scored nine points to lead the USA to a 21–12 victory over Italy. Later that day the team beat Japan 21–14. The next day the USA team struggled early, but went on an 11–1 run to beat Taiwan. Against Spain, Harper scored five points, but Spain was victorious winning 21–18. On the third day the USA team won their quarterfinal game against Argentina 17–5. However, in the semifinal game, the Czech Republic defeated the USA team 21–18. USA played Spain in the bronze medal game, and pulled out the win 20–14.

== University of Kentucky career ==
=== Freshman year ===
Harper helped her team to a 26–9 record in her freshman year. She averaged 6.9 points per game during the season. In the SEC Tournament, the team made it to the finals, but fell short by a single point to Tennessee 71–70. Harper scored 12 points in the game. She was named to the SEC All-Tournament Team.

=== Sophomore year ===
Harper earned a starting position for 17 of the 34 games in her sophomore year. She stepped up her point production to eleven points per game. Despite being only 5' 8", she averaged 7.1 rebounds per game, good enough for seventh place in the SEC and the only player in the top ten under six feet tall. She is the only player in the nation 5' 8" or under to average more than seven rebounds per game. She earned a spot on the SEC All-Defensive Team. Harper decided to transfer before the start of her junior year.

== WNBA career ==
=== Washington Mystics ===
On June 30, 2023, Harper signed a Hardship Contract with the Washington Mystics. On July 4, 2023, the Mystics released Harper from her Hardship Contract. Harper returned one day later to the Mystics on another hardship contract. Harper was released from the Hardship Contract on August 12, 2023.

== Career statistics ==
=== WNBA ===
Legend
GP	Games played	GS	Games started	MPG	Minutes per game	RPG	Rebounds per game
APG	Assists per game	SPG	Steals per game	BPG	Blocks per game	PPG	Points per game
TO	Turnovers per game	FG%	Field-goal percentage	3P%	3-point field-goal percentage	FT%	Free-throw percentage
**Bold**	Career best	°	League leader

Year	Team	GP	GS	MPG	FG%	3P%	FT%	RPG	APG	SPG	BPG	TO	PPG
2018	Chicago	**24**	0	**6.1**	**.404**	.308	**.600**	0.8	**1.0**	**0.2**	0.0	0.4	**2.0**
2021	Minnesota	1	0	5.0	—	—	—	**1.0**	0.0	0.0	0.0	**0.0**	0.0
2023	Washington	14	0	5.2	.308	**.364**	—	0.6	0.3	0.1	0.0	0.3	1.4
Career	3 years, 3 teams	39	0	5.7	.370	.333	.600	0.7	0.7	0.2	0.0	0.4	1.7

=== College ===
Legend
GP	Games played	GS	Games started	MPG	Minutes per game
FG%	Field goal percentage	3P%	3-point field goal percentage	FT%	Free throw percentage
RPG	Rebounds per game	APG	Assists per game	SPG	Steals per game
BPG	Blocks per game	PPG	Points per game	**Bold**	Career high

Year	Team	GP	Points	FG%	3P%	FT%	RPG	APG	SPG	BPG	PPG
2013–14	Kentucky	**35**	243	**46.9%**	24.0%	56.3%	2.8	0.8	0.7	0.1	6.9
2014–15	Kentucky	34	389	38.7%	24.4%	51.4%	7.1	1.6	2.0	**0.1**	11.4
2016–17	Ohio State	24	201	44.6%	**36.1%**	55.8%	5.0	1.9	1.5	0.1	8.4
2017–18	Ohio State	**35**	**505**	46.7%	32.1%	**75.0%**	**8.4**	**2.7**	**2.2**	0.0	**14.4**
Career		128	1338	43.8%	30.2%	58.6%	5.9	1.7	1.6	0.1	10.5

== Awards and honors ==
- 2013 — McDonald's All America Team
- 2013 — USA Today All-USA first team
- 2013 — WBCA All America Team
- 2023–24 — First Pick All Star Ligue de Féminine de Basket 2
