= Trinity High School (Whitesville, Kentucky) =

School in Whitesville, Kentucky, United States

Location
- 10510 Main Cross Street; Whitesville, (Daviess County), Kentucky 42378-9721; United States
- Coordinates: 37°40′52″N 86°52′20″W

Information
- Type: Private, Coeducational
- Motto: Small school; big heart
- Religious affiliation: Roman Catholic
- Principal: Mrs. Emily Hernandez
- Grades: 9–12
- Gender: Coed
- Colors: Blue and White
- Sports: cheerleading, basketball (boys), baseball, softball, basketball(girls), wrestling, volleyball (girls), golf, archery, fishing, cross country
- Team name: Raiders
- Athletic Director: Josh Bowlds
- Website: www.trinityhs.com

Trinity High School is a private, coeducational, Roman Catholic high school in Whitesville, Kentucky. It is located in the Roman Catholic Diocese of Owensboro and is next door to its sister school, the K-8 St. Mary of the Woods private Roman Catholic elementary school.
