= Owensboro Catholic High School =

Location
- 1524 West Parrish Avenue; Owensboro, (Daviess County), Kentucky 42301; United States; 37°45′35″N 87°7′40″W

Information
- Type: Private, Coeducational
- Motto: Faith in Education
- Religious affiliation: Roman Catholic
- Established: 1951
- Superintendent: David Kessler
- President: Tom Lilly
- Principal: George Powell
- Grades: 9–12
  - Grade 9: 123
  - Grade 10: 125
  - Grade 11: 124
  - Grade 12: 135
- Student to teacher ratio: teachers/students 1:18
- Hours in school day: 6
- Colors: Green and White
- Fight song: "Aces Spirit," set to the melody of On, Wisconsin!
- Sports: Baseball, Basketball, Cheerleading, Cross Country, Softball, Football, Swimming and Diving, Track, Volleyball, Golf, Soccer, Wrestling, and Tennis
- Team name: Aces
- Rival: Owensboro High School
- Newspaper: The Peddler
- Campus Minister & Theology Department Chair: Fr. Jason McClure
- Episcopal Vicar: Fr. Pat Reynolds
- Website: www.owensborocatholic.org/schools/OCHS/

Owensboro Catholic High School is a private, Roman Catholic high school in Owensboro, Kentucky, United States. It is located in the Roman Catholic Diocese of Owensboro.

== History ==
Owensboro Catholic opened in September 1951, replacing the closing St. Francis Academy.

=== Bus breakdown ===
In January 2016, a group of approximately 40 Owensboro Catholic students drew national attention after Winter Storm Jonas caused their bus to break down on Interstate 76 in western Pennsylvania. The students were returning from a school-sponsored trip to the March for Life in Washington, D.C., and were stranded in the bus for over twenty hours.

=== Controversy ===
In January 2019, a student from Owensboro Catholic High School was observed making comments at the Indigenous Peoples March in Washington, D.C. The student stated "land gets stolen all the time, it's how it works". The President of Owensboro Catholic Schools, Tom Lilly stated that, "I know that they will use this as an opportunity to make this a teaching moment on the sensitivities involved. Any time there is any question about a time any kid makes a mistake, our goal is to correct them and teach them."

== Academics ==
Owensboro Catholic High School issues three types of high school diplomas: the Standard High School Diploma, the College Preparatory Curriculum Diploma, and the Honors Curriculum Diploma. The Standard Diploma meets Kentucky state requirements for high school graduation. The College Preparatory Diploma and Honors Diploma meet the Pre-College Curriculum, a set of standards set by the Kentucky Department of Education for students planning on attending a four-year Kentucky public university.

Owensboro Catholic High School offers eight Advanced Placement (AP) courses. In July 2019, two of the school's faculty members, Cynda Wood and Bretnea Turner, attended the annual Advanced Placement Conference as presenters.

== Athletics ==
Owensboro Catholic athletic teams are known as the Aces. The Aces basketball team shares the Owensboro Sportscenter with Kentucky Wesleyan College. As of 2026, Owensboro Catholic has won 11 Kentucky High School Athletic Association championships:

- Baseball: 1985
- Fastpitch softball: 1998, 1999, 2003, 2005, 2009 (runners-up in 2001, 2004, 2006, 2013)
- Football: none (runners-up in 1997, 2004, 2005, 2010, 2023, 2024, 2025)
- Cross Country (boys AA): 2001, 2005–2007; (girls A): 2026
- Marching Aces (2021 1A state champions)

== Notable alumni ==
- John Augenstein, golfer
- Florence Henderson – actress and singer who played Carol Brady in The Brady Bunch
- Chris Brown – professional football defensive back
- Rebecca Greenwell – basketball player
- Justin Marks – professional baseball pitcher
- Nicky Hayden – professional motorcycle racer
