= Catholic Students' Mission Crusade =

The Catholic Students’ Mission Crusade (CSMC) was a Roman Catholic youth organization that originated in Chicago and existed from 1918-1970

== History ==
The Catholic Students Mission Crusade (CSMC), was a mission education organization, founded in 1918 by two Society of Divine Word seminarians, Clifford J. King and Robert B. Clark, who wanted to establish an organization similar to the highly successful Protestant Student Volunteer Movement for Foreign Missions that John Mott had founded. The first meeting took place in 1918 at Techny, outside Chicago, Illinois, with over 100 clergy, seminarians, laity and a few bishops attending. The organization grew quickly under the leadership of Frank A. Thill, its national director who later became Bishop of Salinas, Kansas in 1938. Thill edited the organization's national magazine, The Shield, and traveled the country challenging students to imitate the zeal and dedication of the medieval Crusaders for their faith.

Two parallel themes permeated the organization: imagery surrounding the medieval crusaders and the promotion of missions at home and abroad. By the 1930s, the CSMC had enrolled a half-million members. In the next decade, it began compiling U.S. Catholic missionary statistics and in the 1950s it drew on the experience and knowledge of member mission societies to produce Fundamentals of Missiology and Perspectives in Religion and Culture. Other books in the 1960s drew attention of U.S. Catholics to the church and cultures in Africa and Asia.

At biennial national conventions, except during World War II, several thousand youth and adult leaders rallied for a summer conference, where they listened to talks by missionaries, walked through large-as-life mission displays, and took part in liturgical services aimed at inspiring young people to read, support missionaries in prayer and to consider a mission vocation themselves. Locally the CSMC was conducted in school units on the junior and senior high school level, as well as in colleges and seminaries. The units used the many audio-visual resources produced by the national office in Cincinnati, Ohio, and attempted to infuse a mission spirit throughout the schools. "Round Table" discussions, talks by returned missionaries, prayer, song and mission kits provided information and formation about missions at home and abroad. For half a century, the Catholic Student Mission Crusade became one of the most effective and pervasive mission education and promotion programs.

The CSMC closed its national doors in 1972. New understandings of mission which surfaced at the Second Vatican Council, the demise of crusade themes and medieval imagery, and a plethora of liturgical and catechetical developments following the Council, and social and political issues of the 1970s directed the attention of U.S. Catholic youth elsewhere."

== Sources ==
- Dries, A. (Spring 1998). "Whatever Happened to the Catholic Students Mission Crusade". The Living Light. 34 (3): 61–64.
- Dries, A. (1998). The Missionary Movement in American Catholic History. NY: Maryknoll.
- Robert, Dana L. (2011). "Review of American Crusade: Catholic Youth in the World Mission Movement from World War I through Vatican II". American Catholic Studies. 122 (4): 92–94 – via Project MUSE.
