= 2026 FIBA U16 Women's EuroBasket =

International youth basketball tournament

Tournament details
- Host country: Romania
- Cities: Pitești; Mioveni
- Dates: 14–22 August 2026
- Teams: 16 (from 1 confederation)
- Venues: 2 (in 2 host cities)

Final positions
- Champions: Spain (12th title)
- Runners-up: Slovenia
- Third place: France

Tournament statistics
- MVP: (Spain) Amelia Alonso
- Top scorer: (Israel) Michal Abudram (117 Pts)

Official website
- www.fiba.basketball

The 2026 FIBA U16 Women's EuroBasket was the 36th edition of the European basketball championship for women's under-16 national teams. The tournament was played in Pitești and Mioveni, Romania, from 14 to 22 August 2026.

Spain secured their 12th overall title with a victory over Slovenia in the final, 87–40.

== Participating teams ==
Team	App	Last	Streak	Best placement in the tournament	Prev
Teams maintained from the 2025 edition
Bulgaria	13th	2013	1	Runners-up (1984)	▲2nd, Div. B
Croatia	22nd	2025	5	Runners-up (2010)	12th
Czech Republic	24th	2025	2	Champions (2015)	13th
France	33rd	2025	25	Champions (2001, 2007, 2017, 2022, 2023)	7th
Germany	22nd	2025	3	Runners-up (2016)	3rd
Hungary	31st	2025	14	Runners-up (1976, 2017)	10th
Israel	7th	2025	4	Eleventh place (1976, 2025)	11th
Italy	33rd	2025	17	Champions (2018)	6th
Latvia	16th	2025	12	Fourth place (2017, 2025)	4th
Lithuania	14th	2022	1	Runners-up (2019)	▲1st, Div. B
Poland	23rd	2025	8	Third place (2005)	8th
Romania	13th	2025	2	Runners-up (1989)	9th
Serbia	15th	2025	4	Fourth place (2007, 2010)	5th
Slovenia	6th	2025	5	Runners-up (2025)	2nd
Spain	36th	2025	36	Champions (1999, 2004, 2005, 2006, 2008, 2009, 2011, 2012, 2013, 2016, 2025)	1st
Turkey	20th	2023	1	Fourth place (2005, 2011, 2018)	▲3rd, Div. B

== First round ==
The draw of the first round was held on 5 February 2026 in Freising, Germany.

In the first round, the teams were drawn into four groups of four. All teams advanced to the playoffs.

All times are local (Eastern European Summer Time; UTC+3).

=== Group A ===
Pos	Team	Pld	W	L	PF	PA	PD	Pts
1	France	3	3	0	258	117	+141	6
2	Serbia	3	2	1	208	174	+34	5
3	Croatia	3	1	2	145	222	−77	4
4	Romania	3	0	3	127	225	−98	3

Source: FIBA

14 August 2026
13:00

Boxscore

France	97–41	Croatia
Scoring by quarter: 28–14, 25–8, 23–6, 21–13

Sala Sporturilor Mioveni
Attendance: 33

14 August 2026
18:00

Boxscore

Serbia	90–44	Romania
Scoring by quarter: 23–8, 28–9, 25–8, 14–19

Pitești Arena
Attendance: 545

15 August 2026
13:00

Boxscore

Croatia	47–73	Serbia
Scoring by quarter: 12–26, 9–20, 6–20, 20–7

Pitești Arena
Attendance: 50

15 August 2026
18:00

Boxscore

Romania	31–78	France
Scoring by quarter: 10–23, 11–23, 5–26, 5–6

Pitești Arena
Attendance: 709

16 August 2026
13:00

Boxscore

France	83–45	Serbia
Scoring by quarter: 31–15, 13–9, 20–9, 19–12

Sala Sporturilor Mioveni
Attendance: 58

16 August 2026
20:30

Boxscore

Romania	52–57	Croatia
Scoring by quarter: 10–20, 17–13, 17–14, 8–10

Pitești Arena
Attendance: 152

=== Group B ===
Pos	Team	Pld	W	L	PF	PA	PD	Pts
1	Latvia	3	2	1	192	188	+4	5
2	Turkey	3	2	1	183	171	+12	5
3	Israel	3	1	2	192	183	+9	4
4	Italy	3	1	2	163	188	−25	4

Source: FIBA

14 August 2026
13:00

Boxscore

Italy	37–68	Israel
Scoring by quarter: 9–16, 2–20, 8–17, 18–15

Pitești Arena
Attendance: 55

14 August 2026
15:30

Boxscore

Latvia	57–52	Turkey
Scoring by quarter: 24–10, 7–9, 12–12, 14–21

Pitești Arena
Attendance: 86

15 August 2026
13:00

Boxscore

Israel	63–74	Latvia
Scoring by quarter: 22–16, 13–18, 11–20, 17–20

Sala Sporturilor Mioveni
Attendance: 35

15 August 2026
18:00

Boxscore

Turkey	59–53	Italy
Scoring by quarter: 14–10, 12–5, 19–12, 14–26

Sala Sporturilor Mioveni
Attendance: 50

16 August 2026
13:00

Boxscore

Italy	73–61	Latvia
Scoring by quarter: 17–10, 15–20, 21–12, 20–19

Pitești Arena
Attendance: 50

16 August 2026
20:30

Boxscore

Turkey	72–61	Israel
Scoring by quarter: 18–21, 17–9, 13–19, 24–12

Sala Sporturilor Mioveni
Attendance: 100

=== Group C ===
Pos	Team	Pld	W	L	PF	PA	PD	Pts
1	Spain	3	3	0	348	90	+258	6
2	Poland	3	2	1	189	224	−35	5
3	Czech Republic	3	1	2	195	244	−49	4
4	Bulgaria	3	0	3	128	302	−174	3

Source: FIBA

14 August 2026
15:30

Boxscore

Poland	80–52	Bulgaria
Scoring by quarter: 18–10, 18–18, 20–15, 24–9

Sala Sporturilor Mioveni
Attendance: 78

14 August 2026
18:00

Boxscore

Spain	109–40	Czech Republic
Scoring by quarter: 28–3, 25–13, 28–13, 28–11

Sala Sporturilor Mioveni
Attendance: 60

15 August 2026
15:30

Boxscore

Bulgaria	13–128	Spain
Scoring by quarter: 3–35, 3–37, 5–29, 2–27

Sala Sporturilor Mioveni
Attendance: 74

15 August 2026
20:30

Boxscore

Czech Republic	61–72	Poland
Scoring by quarter: 21–14, 5–20, 15–17, 20–21

Sala Sporturilor Mioveni
Attendance: 50

16 August 2026
15:30

Boxscore

Spain	111–37	Poland
Scoring by quarter: 22–10, 27–8, 33–10, 29–9

Pitești Arena
Attendance: 85

16 August 2026
20:30

Boxscore

Bulgaria	63–94	Czech Republic
Scoring by quarter: 20–21, 16–29, 14–21, 13–23

Pitești Arena
Attendance: 65

=== Group D ===
Pos	Team	Pld	W	L	PF	PA	PD	Pts
1	Slovenia	3	3	0	218	143	+75	6
2	Hungary	3	2	1	218	182	+36	5
3	Germany	3	1	2	167	231	−64	4
4	Lithuania	3	0	3	188	235	−47	3

Source: FIBA

14 August 2026
20:30

Boxscore

Slovenia	58–53	Hungary
Scoring by quarter: 15–15, 13–13, 17–11, 13–14

Sala Sporturilor Mioveni
Attendance: 50

14 August 2026
20:30

Boxscore

Germany	73–68	Lithuania
Scoring by quarter: 15–19, 20–14, 20–20, 18–15

Pitești Arena
Attendance: 108

15 August 2026
15:30

Boxscore

Lithuania	51–79	Slovenia
Scoring by quarter: 15–22, 16–17, 4–16, 16–24

Pitești Arena
Attendance: 112

15 August 2026
20:30

Boxscore

Hungary	82–55	Germany
Scoring by quarter: 24–14, 22–8, 24–21, 12–12

Pitești Arena
Attendance: 108

16 August 2026
15:30

Boxscore

Lithuania	69–83	Hungary
Scoring by quarter: 19–23, 23–17, 14–19, 13–24

Sala Sporturilor Mioveni
Attendance: 54

16 August 2026
18:00

Boxscore

Slovenia	81–39	Germany
Scoring by quarter: 16–10, 13–17, 32–8, 20–4

Sala Sporturilor Mioveni
Attendance: 70

== Final round ==
=== Main bracket ===
Round of 16
18 August
A1 France	89
B4 Italy	41
18 August
C2 Poland	46
D3 Germany	64
18 August
B2 Turkey	61
A3 Croatia	40
18 August
D1 Slovenia	82
C4 Bulgaria	45
18 August
A2 Serbia	66
B3 Israel	56
18 August
C1 Spain	118
D4 Lithuania	27
18 August
B1 Latvia	91
A4 Romania	46
18 August
D2 Hungary	79
C3 Czech Republic	71

Quarterfinals
19 August
A1 France	79
D3 Germany	39
19 August
B2 Turkey	47
D1 Slovenia	54
19 August
A2 Serbia	41
C1 Spain	88
19 August
B1 Latvia	75
D2 Hungary	69

Semifinals
21 August
A1 France	58
D1 Slovenia	67
21 August
C1 Spain	91
B1 Latvia	53

Final
22 August
D1 Slovenia	40
C1 Spain	87
Third place match
22 August
A1 France	78
B1 Latvia	58

=== Round of 16 ===
18 August 2026
13:00

Boxscore

Slovenia	82–45	Bulgaria
Scoring by quarter: 18–9, 23–13, 25–11, 16–12

Sala Sporturilor Mioveni
Attendance: 48

18 August 2026
13:00

Boxscore

Poland	46–64	Germany
Scoring by quarter: 10–8, 13–17, 10–19, 13–20

Pitești Arena
Attendance: 79

18 August 2026
15:30

Boxscore

Turkey	61–40	Croatia
Scoring by quarter: 16–10, 21–10, 14–10, 10–10

Sala Sporturilor Mioveni
Attendance: 63

18 August 2026
15:30

Boxscore

France	89–41	Italy
Scoring by quarter: 28–8, 19–11, 21–9, 21–13

Pitești Arena
Attendance: 115

18 August 2026
18:00

Boxscore

Serbia	66–56	Israel
Scoring by quarter: 26–5, 13–16, 12–21, 15–14

Sala Sporturilor Mioveni
Attendance: 50

18 August 2026
18:00

Boxscore

Latvia	91–46	Romania
Scoring by quarter: 17–13, 31–13, 22–8, 21–12

Pitești Arena
Attendance: 156

18 August 2026
20:30

Boxscore

Spain	118–27	Lithuania
Scoring by quarter: 21–7, 30–2, 36–11, 31–7

Sala Sporturilor Mioveni
Attendance: 70

18 August 2026
20:30

Boxscore

Hungary	79–71	Czech Republic
Scoring by quarter: 17–19, 22–21, 24–16, 16–15

Pitești Arena
Attendance: 63

=== 9th–16th place classification playoffs ===
9th–16th place quarterfinals
19 August
B4 Italy	47
C2 Poland	63
19 August
A3 Croatia	96
C4 Bulgaria	60
19 August
B3 Israel	69
D4 Lithuania	80
19 August
A4 Romania	46
C3 Czech Republic	70

9th–12th place semifinals
21 August
C2 Poland	82
A3 Croatia	61
21 August
D4 Lithuania	55
C3 Czech Republic	86

Ninth place match
22 August
C2 Poland	63
C3 Czech Republic	62
Eleventh place match
22 August
A3 Croatia	67
D4 Lithuania	70

13th–16th place semifinals
21 August
B4 Italy	72
C4 Bulgaria	48
21 August
B3 Israel	70
A4 Romania	51

Thirteenth place match
22 August
B4 Italy	53
B3 Israel	58
Fifteenth place match
22 August
C4 Bulgaria	71
A4 Romania	75

==== 9th–16th place quarterfinals ====
19 August 2026
13:00

Boxscore

Croatia	96–60	Bulgaria
Scoring by quarter: 19–13, 25–18, 28–14, 24–15

Sala Sporturilor Mioveni
Attendance: 30

19 August 2026
15:30

Boxscore

Italy	47–63	Poland
Scoring by quarter: 10–15, 7–14, 12–14, 18–20

Sala Sporturilor Mioveni
Attendance: 50

19 August 2026
18:00

Boxscore

Romania	46–70	Czech Republic
Scoring by quarter: 6–18, 13–22, 13–18, 14–12

Sala Sporturilor Mioveni
Attendance: 115

19 August 2026
20:30

Boxscore

Israel	69–80	Lithuania
Scoring by quarter: 17–13, 21–21, 12–19, 19–27

Sala Sporturilor Mioveni
Attendance: 55

==== 13th–16th place semifinals ====
21 August 2026
13:00

Boxscore

Italy	72–48	Bulgaria
Scoring by quarter: 21–12, 24–18, 12–14, 15–4

Sala Sporturilor Mioveni
Attendance: 23

21 August 2026
15:30

Boxscore

Israel	70–51	Romania
Scoring by quarter: 18–8, 19–15, 14–17, 19–11

Sala Sporturilor Mioveni
Attendance: 172

==== Fifteenth place match ====
22 August 2026
11:30

Boxscore

Bulgaria	71–75	Romania
Scoring by quarter: 19–20, 11–16, 21–21, 20–18

Sala Sporturilor Mioveni
Attendance: 60

==== Thirteenth place match ====
22 August 2026
14:00

Boxscore

Italy	53–58	Israel
Scoring by quarter: 13–19, 8–18, 17–14, 15–7

Sala Sporturilor Mioveni
Attendance: 67

==== 9th–12th place semifinals ====
21 August 2026
18:00

Boxscore

Poland	82–61	Croatia
Scoring by quarter: 24–14, 15–15, 26–22, 17–10

Sala Sporturilor Mioveni
Attendance: 40

21 August 2026
20:30

Boxscore

Lithuania	55–86	Czech Republic
Scoring by quarter: 15–13, 13–28, 15–18, 12–27

Sala Sporturilor Mioveni
Attendance: 89

==== Eleventh place match ====
22 August 2026
16:30

Boxscore

Croatia	67–70	Lithuania
Scoring by quarter: 26–13, 8–21, 20–15, 13–21

Sala Sporturilor Mioveni
Attendance: 50

==== Ninth place match ====
22 August 2026
19:00

Boxscore

Poland	63–62	Czech Republic
Scoring by quarter: 14–15, 13–14, 17–20, 19–13

Sala Sporturilor Mioveni

=== Quarterfinals ===
19 August 2026
13:00

Boxscore

Turkey	47–54	Slovenia
Scoring by quarter: 17–21, 11–11, 11–13, 8–9

Pitești Arena
Attendance: 86

19 August 2026
15:30

Boxscore

France	79–39	Germany
Scoring by quarter: 22–7, 17–7, 19–15, 21–10

Pitești Arena
Attendance: 89

19 August 2026
18:00

Boxscore

Latvia	75–69	Hungary
Scoring by quarter: 10–14, 28–10, 19–17, 18–28

Pitești Arena
Attendance: 112

19 August 2026
20:30

Boxscore

Serbia	41–88	Spain
Scoring by quarter: 8–28, 9–15, 16–30, 8–15

Pitești Arena
Attendance: 120

=== 5th–8th place classification playoffs ===
5th–8th place semifinals
21 August
D3 Germany	51
B2 Turkey	77
21 August
A2 Serbia	40
D2 Hungary	77

Fifth place match
22 August
B2 Turkey	59
D2 Hungary	70
Seventh place match
22 August
D3 Germany	54
A2 Serbia	73

==== 5th–8th place semifinals ====
21 August 2026
13:00

Boxscore

Germany	51–77	Turkey
Scoring by quarter: 17–23, 11–21, 15–20, 8–13

Pitești Arena
Attendance: 84

21 August 2026
15:30

Boxscore

Serbia	40–77	Hungary
Scoring by quarter: 10–18, 11–22, 12–20, 7–17

Pitești Arena
Attendance: 70

==== Seventh place match ====
22 August 2026
13:00

Boxscore

Germany	54–73	Serbia
Scoring by quarter: 16–15, 17–19, 13–24, 8–15

Pitești Arena
Attendance: 70

==== Fifth place match ====
22 August 2026
15:30

Boxscore

Turkey	59–70	Hungary
Scoring by quarter: 16–22, 7–18, 19–17, 17–13

Pitești Arena
Attendance: 95

=== Semifinals ===
21 August 2026
18:00

Boxscore

France	58–67	Slovenia
Scoring by quarter: 4–21, 23–14, 16–15, 15–17

Pitești Arena
Attendance: 100

21 August 2026
20:30

Boxscore

Spain	91–53	Latvia
Scoring by quarter: 15–14, 31–8, 19–14, 26–17

Pitești Arena
Attendance: 150

=== Third place match ===
22 August 2026
18:00

Boxscore

France	78–58	Latvia
Scoring by quarter: 15–12, 21–15, 16–16, 26–15

Pitești Arena
Attendance: 237

=== Final ===
22 August 2026
20:30

Boxscore

Slovenia	40–87	Spain
Scoring by quarter: 9–21, 10–18, 13–22, 8–26

Pitești Arena
Attendance: 832

== Final standings ==
Rank	Team	Record
1st place, gold medalist(s)	Spain	7–0
2nd place, silver medalist(s)	Slovenia	6–1
3rd place, bronze medalist(s)	France	6–1
4th	Latvia	4–3
5th	Hungary	5–2
6th	Turkey	4–3
7th	Serbia	4–3
8th	Germany	2–5
9th	Poland	5–2
10th	Czech Republic	3–4
11th	Lithuania	2–5
12th	Croatia	2–5
13th	Israel	3–4
14th	Italy	2–5
15th	Romania	1–6
16th	Bulgaria	0–7

Relegated to the 2027 FIBA U16 Women's EuroBasket Division B
Qualified for the 2027 FIBA U16 Women's EuroBasket as host nation

== Statistics and awards ==
=== Awards ===
The awards were announced on 22 August 2026.

Award	Player
All-Tournament Team	(Spain) Amelia Alonso
All-Tournament Team	(Spain) Paula Reynal
All-Tournament Team	(Slovenia) Veronika Ferjančič
All-Tournament Team	(Latvia) Nadine Graudina
All-Tournament Team	(France) Kimberly Kanayan N'Simba
Most Valuable Player	(Spain) Amelia Alonso
