= Filipović =

Filipović (Serbian Cyrillic: Филиповић, pronounced [filǐːpoʋitɕ, fǐli-]) is a patronymic formed out of the name Filip and the suffix -ić. It is a common surname in South Slavic languages. It's cognate to Bulgarian Filipov or Polish Filipowicz.

Notable people with the surname include:

- Aleksandar Filipović (rower) (born 1992), Serbian rower
- Aleksandar Filipović (footballer) (born 1994), Serbian professional footballer
- Andrija Filipović, Croatian football player
- Benjamin Filipović, Bosnian film director
- Darijana Filipović, Bosnian Croat politician
- Filip Filipović (politician) (1878–1938), Serbian communist politician
- Filip Filipović (American football) (born 1977), American football player of Serbian descent
- Filip Filipović (water polo) (born 1987), Serbian water polo player
- Ivan Filipović (teacher), Croatian educator, writer and activist
- Ivan Filipović Grčić, Croatian priest and soldier
- Ivan Filipović (footballer), Croatian football player
- Jakov Filipović, Croatian football player
- Jill Filipovic, American author and lawyer of Serbian descent
- Josip Filipović, Croatian general in the Austro-Hungarian army
- Lazar Filipović, Serbian paratriathlete
- Mirko Filipović, Croatian kickboxer and mixed martial artist
- Miroslav Filipović, Croatian World War II war criminal
- Muhamed Filipović, Bosnian academic, writer, essayist, theorist and philosopher
- Nenad Filipović (racewalker) (born 1978), Serbian racewalker
- Nenad Filipović (footballer) (born 1987), Serbian footballer
- Ognjen Filipović, Serbian canoer
- Predrag Filipović (racewalker) (born 1978), Serbian racewalker
- Predrag Filipović (footballer) (born 1975), Montenegrin footballer
- Stefan Filipović, Montenegrin singer
- Stjepan Filipović, Croatian-born Yugoslav Partisan
- Tarik Filipović, Bosnian and Croatian actor and television presenter
- Teodor Filipović, Serbian writer, jurist and educator
- Željko Filipović, Slovenian footballer
- Zlata Filipović, Bosnian author
- Zoran Filipović, Montenegrin football player and coach

== See also ==
- Pilipović
- Barun Filipović (disambiguation)
