= Pilipovich =

Pilipovich is a Belarusian surname derived from the given name Pilip. It may be Polonized as Pilipowicz. Notable people with the surname include:

- Dave Pilipovich (born 1964), American college basketball coach
- Sergey Pilipovich (born 1976), Belarusian agronomist

== See also ==
- Filipowicz
- Pilipović, South Slavic
