= Filipowicz =

Filipowicz is a Polish surname derived from the given name Filip. Notable people with the surname include:

- Andrzej Filipowicz (born 1938), Polish chess player and arbiter
- Kornel Filipowicz (1913–1990), Polish author
- Maciej Filipowicz (born 1998), Polish footballer
- Paul Filipowicz (born 1950), American blues musician
- Steve Filipowicz (1921–1975), American professional football and baseball player
- Tytus Filipowicz (1873–1953), Polish politician and diplomat
- Wanda Krahelska-Filipowicz (1886–1968), leading figure in Warsaw's underground resistance movement
- Zofia Filipowiczowa, Polish woman accused of witchcraft

== See also ==
- Filipović, South Slavic
- Pilipovich, Belarusian
