= Bergmark =

Bergmark is a surname. Notable people with the surname include:

- Bret Bergmark (born 1973), American mixed martial artist
- Filip Bergmark (born 1995), Swedish ice hockey player
- Niclas Bergmark (born 2002), Swedish footballer
- Orvar Bergmark (1930–2004), Swedish footballer, manager, and bandy player
