= Zosia =

Zosia is a given name or popular diminutive of name Zofia. Notable people with the name include:

- Zosia Karbowiak (born 1980), Polish singer-songwriter
- Zosia Mamet (born 1988), American actress and musician
- Gila Golan (born 1940, originally Zosia Zawadzka), Israeli former model and actress
- Zosia March, a fictional character from the BBC medical drama Holby City
- Zosia, a character from the Polish epic poem Pan Tadeusz
- Zosia Boski, a character from the Polish historical novel Fire in the Steppe
- Zosia, a fictional character from the TV show Pluribus, played by Karolina Wydra

== See also ==
- Zosia, crater on Venus
