= Pilipović =

Pilipović is a surname of South Slavic origin, a patronymic of the given name Pilip. Notable people with the surname include:

- Borislav Pilipović (born 1984), Bosnian-Herzegovinian football player
- Kristian Pilipovic (born 1994), Croatian-born Austrian handball player
- Renato Pilipović (born 1977), Croatian football player and coach
- Stevan Pilipović (born 1950), Serbian mathematician
- Stojan Pilipović (born 1987), Serbian football player
- Tamara Pilipović (born 1990), Serbian politician

== See also ==
- Pilipovich
- Filipović
