= Pylyp =

Pylyp (Ukrainian: Пилип) is a Ukraininan masculine given name, cognate to Philip. Notable people with the name include:

- Pylyp Budkivskyi (born 1992), Ukrainian football player
- Pylyp Harmash (born 1989), Ukrainian volleyball player
- Pylyp Kozytskiy (1893–1960), Ukrainian composer and musicologist
- Pylyp Morachevskyi (1806–1879), Ukrainian poet and translator
- Pylyp Orlyk (1672–1742), Ukrainian hetman

== See also ==
- Pilip
- Filip
