= Zośka =

Zośka may refer to:

- A diminutive form of Polish name Zofia (disambiguation)
- Zoska Veras (1892–1991), writer
- Zośka, code-name of Polish national hero Tadeusz Zawadzki
- Battalion Zośka, elite unit of Warsaw Uprising
- Polish word for Hacky Sack
