= 2011 FIBA Europe Under-16 Championship for Women =

2011 FIBA U16 Women's European Championship
23rd FIBA Under-16 Women's European Basketball Championship

Tournament details
- Host country: Italy
- Dates: 11–21 August 2011
- Teams: 16 (from 1 confederation)
- Venues: 2 (in 1 host city)

Final positions
- Champions: Spain (7th title)

Official website
- www.fibaeurope.com

The 2011 FIBA Europe Under-16 Championship for Women was the 23rd edition of the FIBA Europe Under-16 Championship for Women. 16 teams participated in the competition, held in Cagliari, Italy, from 11 to 21 August 2011.

== Teams ==
- Belgium
- Croatia
- Czech Republic
- Finland
- France
- Greece
- Hungary ▲ Winners, 2010 FIBA Europe Under-16 Championship for Women Division B
- Italy
- Netherlands
- Poland
- Russia
- Serbia
- Slovakia ▲ Runners-up, 2010 FIBA Europe Under-16 Championship for Women Division B
- Spain
- Sweden
- Turkey

== Group stages ==
=== Preliminary round ===
In this round, the sixteen teams were allocated in four groups of four teams each. The top three qualified for the qualifying round. The last team of each group played for the 13th–16th place in the Classification Games.

Team advanced to Qualifying Round
Team competed in Classification Round

==== Group A ====
Team	Pld	W	L	PF	PA	PD	Pts	Tiebreaker
Sweden	3	2	1	159	145	+14	5	1–0
Belgium	3	2	1	199	145	+54	5	0–1
Slovakia	3	1	2	157	185	–28	4	1–0
Poland	3	1	2	127	167	–40	4	0–1

August 11
14:30

Report

Sweden	56–49	Belgium
Scoring by quarter: 14–7, 17–11, 11–17, 14–14
Pts: Hanson 14; Rebs: Hanson, Mirkovic 10; Asts: Lindrgen, Hanson 4		Pts: Abdelkader 15; Rebs: Bernard, Nauwelaers 7 Asts: Abdelkader, Allemand 4

Pala Rockefeller, Cagliari
Attendance: 100

August 11
16:45

Report

Poland	41–58	Slovakia
Scoring by quarter: 13–22, 16–7, 11–15, 1–14
Pts: Stankiewicz 10; Rebs: Pobozy 7 Asts: Stankiewicz 3		Pts: Hruscáková 14; Rebs: Dudásová 15; Asts: Dudásová, Matuskova 3

Pala Rockefeller, Cagliari
Attendance: 100

August 12
14:30

Report

Slovakia	50–63	Sweden
Scoring by quarter: 14–20, 17–12, 11–17, 8–14
Pts: Hruscáková 18; Rebs: Hruscáková 13; Asts: Matuskova 5		Pts: Magarity 19; Rebs: Hanson 13; Asts: Hanson 4

Palazzeto Quartu S. Elena, Cagliari
Attendance: 100

August 12
21:15

Report

Belgium	69–40	Poland
Scoring by quarter: 26-12, 21-11, 13-9, 9-8
Pts: Nauwelaers 22; Rebs: Bernard 17; Asts: Abdelkader 7		Pts: Duraj 8 Rebs: Szajtauer 9 Asts: Buczak, Stankiewicz 2

Palazzeto Quartu S. Elena, Cagliari
Attendance: 100

August 13
16:45

Report

Sweden	40–46	Poland
Scoring by quarter: 10-13, 7-9, 11-12, 12-12
Pts: Magarity 10; Rebs: Magarity 11; Asts: Eriksson 3		Pts: Duraj, Telenga 11; Rebs: Telenga 15; Asts: four players 1

Pala Rockefeller, Cagliari
Attendance: 100

August 13
19:00

Report

Slovakia	49–81	Belgium
Scoring by quarter: 8-32, 10-16, 13-19, 18-14
Pts: Migova 13; Rebs: Zarevúcka 9 Asts: Matuskova 4		Pts: Abdelkader 18; Rebs: Nauwelaers 8 Asts: Allemand 8

Pala Rockefeller, Cagliari
Attendance: 100

==== Group B ====
Team	Pld	W	L	PF	PA	PD	Pts	Tiebreaker
Russia	3	3	0	197	142	+55	6	
Greece	3	2	1	173	160	+13	5	
Czech Republic	3	1	2	156	172	–16	4	
Croatia	3	0	3	175	227	–52	3	

August 11
14:30

Report

Czech Republic	39–51	Russia
Scoring by quarter: 9–10, 6–15, 7–18, 17–8
Pts: Hoskova 17; Rebs: three players 6 Asts: Hoskova, Lancova 1		Pts: Fedorova 12; Rebs: Fedorova 9 Asts: Komarova 5

Quartu S. Elena, Cagliari
Attendance: 100

August 11
16:45

Report

Greece	68–56	Croatia
Scoring by quarter: 17–10, 14–8, 17–17, 20–21
Pts: Stamolamprou 19; Rebs: Fouraki, Pavlopoulou 6 Asts: Kyratzi 6		Pts: Chiabov 22; Rebs: Chiabov 11; Asts: Dujic, Racki 2

S. Elena, Cagliari
Attendance: 100

August 12
14:30

Report

Croatia	68–74	Czech Republic
Scoring by quarter: 20–17, 17–19, 12–22, 19–16
Pts: Chiabov 25; Rebs: Saric 7 Asts: Butina 6		Pts: Hoskova 21; Rebs: Krivánková, Opocenska 9 Asts: Hoskova, Mircová 3

Pala Rockefeller, Cagliari
Attendance: 100

August 12
21:15

Report

Russia	61–52	Greece
Scoring by quarter: 22-14, 10-6, 15-23, 14-9
Pts: Ilinova 14; Rebs: Chaykovskaya 8 Asts: Chaykovskaya, Fedorova 2		Pts: Kyratzi 19; Rebs: Tsavou 6 Asts: six players 1

Pala Rockefeller, Cagliari
Attendance: 100

August 13
16:45

Report

Croatia	51–85	Russia
Scoring by quarter: 12-19, 7-16, 18-27, 14-23
Pts: Chiabov 16; Rebs: Saric, Chiabov 8 Asts: Matic 4		Pts: Ilinova 18; Rebs: Tsukanova 10; Asts: Shomodi, Safonova 3

Palazzeto Quartu S. Elena, Cagliari
Attendance: 100

August 13
19:00

Report

Czech Republic	43–53	Greece
Scoring by quarter: 12-17, 11-10, 10-15, 10-11
Pts: Opocenska 13; Rebs: Hoskova, Opocenska 10; Asts: Beránková 1		Pts: Tsavou 19; Rebs: Tsavou 10; Asts: Kyratzi 3

Palazzeto Quartu S. Elena, Cagliari
Attendance: 100

==== Group C ====
Team	Pld	W	L	PF	PA	PD	Pts	Tiebreaker
Spain	3	3	0	257	91	+166	6	
Italy	3	2	1	146	170	–24	5	
Hungary	3	1	2	145	174	–29	4	
Finland	3	0	3	103	216	–113	3	

August 11
19:00

Report

Italy	27–87	Spain
Scoring by quarter: 4–18, 6–18, 13–26, 4–25
Pts: Zandalasini 8 Rebs: three players 4 Asts: Kacerik 2		Pts: Lizarazu 14; Rebs: Santo 6 Asts: five players 2

Pala Rockefeller, Cagliari
Attendance: 200

August 11
21:15

Report

Finland	42–59	Hungary
Scoring by quarter: 11–12, 11–20, 8–11, 12–16
Pts: Rantanen 8 Rebs: Menna 11; Asts: six players 1		Pts: Bodnár 15; Rebs: Mellár 8 Asts: three players 3

Pala Rockefeller, Cagliari
Attendance: 100

August 12
16:45

Report

Hungary	49–62	Italy
Scoring by quarter: 12-16, 15-13, 10-16, 12-7
Pts: Bodnár 14; Rebs: Bodnár 10; Asts: Böröndy, Dobos 3		Pts: Zandalasini 19; Rebs: Zandalasini 9 Asts: Penna 5

Palazzeto Quartu S. Elena, Cagliari
Attendance: 150

August 12
19:00

Report

Spain	100–27	Finland
Scoring by quarter: 22-12, 25-7, 27-4, 26-4
Pts: Arrojo 18; Rebs: Arrojo 7 Asts: Arrojo, Rodriguez 4		Pts: Hämäläinen 8 Rebs: Hämäläinen 5 Asts: four players 1

Palazzeto Quartu S. Elena, Cagliari
Attendance: 100

August 13
14:30

Report

Hungary	37–70	Spain
Scoring by quarter: 12-20, 10-16, 5-19, 10-15
Pts: Böröndy 11; Rebs: Varga 6 Asts: Kalocsai 2		Pts: Arrojo 17; Rebs: Romero 9 Asts: Romero 4

Pala Rockefeller, Cagliari
Attendance: 100

August 13
21:15

Report

Italy	57–34	Finland
Scoring by quarter: 20-13, 19-6, 14-4, 4-11
Pts: Zandalasini 11; Rebs: Djedjemel, Ercoli 7 Asts: Peresson, Djedjemel 3		Pts: Äijänen 8 Rebs: Äijänen, Menna 8 Asts: Jämsä 3

Pala Rockefeller, Cagliari
Attendance: 200

==== Group D ====
Team	Pld	W	L	PF	PA	PD	Pts	Tiebreaker
Turkey	3	3	0	183	161	+22	6	
France	3	2	1	208	166	+42	5	
Netherlands	3	1	2	156	184	–28	4	
Serbia	3	0	3	181	217	–36	3	

August 11
19:00

Report

Turkey	60–59	France
Scoring by quarter: 11–16, 17–12, 16–16, 16–15
Pts: Akbas 13; Rebs: Coklar 12; Asts: Akbas 3		Pts: Koné 16; Rebs: Koné 11; Asts: Morateur 4

Palazzeto Quartu S. Elena, Cagliari
Attendance: 100

August 11
21:15

Report

Serbia	61–68	Netherlands
Scoring by quarter: 13–22, 16–19, 17–12, 17–16
Pts: Mandic 29; Rebs: Crvendakic 9 Asts: Crvendakic 2		Pts: Jonge 16; Rebs: Lammerink 12; Asts: Slim 5

Palazzeto Quartu S. Elena, Cagliari
Attendance: 150

August 12
16:45

Report

Netherlands	46–57	Turkey
Scoring by quarter: 11-19, 11-12, 16-11, 8-15
Pts: Slim, Hof 13; Rebs: Hof 9 Asts: Cornelius 4		Pts: Manlaci, Basaran 14; Rebs: Manlaci 9 Asts: four players 2

Pala Rockefeller, Cagliari
Attendance: 100

August 12
19:00

Report

France	83–64	Serbia
Scoring by quarter: 16-17, 23-15, 23-15, 21-17
Pts: Djaldi-Tabdi 23; Rebs: Djaldi-Tabdi 14; Asts: Devillers, Dinga-Mbomi 3		Pts: Crvendakic 19; Rebs: Ristic 7 Asts: Mandic 5

Pala Rockefeller, Cagliari
Attendance: 100

August 13
14:30

Report

Turkey	66–56	Serbia
Scoring by quarter: 11-12, 12-16, 20-15, 23-13
Pts: Coklar 23; Rebs: Coklar 14; Asts: Akbas, Atas 4		Pts: Crvendakic 15; Rebs: Crvendakic 12; Asts: Mandic 4

Palazzeto Quartu S. Elena, Cagliari
Attendance: 100

August 13
21:15

Report

Netherlands	42–66	France
Scoring by quarter: 15-13, 10-18, 11-13, 6-22
Pts: Cornelius 11; Rebs: Lammerink 6 Asts: Kuijt, Hof 1		Pts: Djaldi-Tabdi 15; Rebs: Djaldi-Tabdi 10; Asts: Gaye 2

Palazzeto Quartu S. Elena, Cagliari
Attendance: 150

=== Qualifying round ===
The twelve teams remaining were allocated in two groups of six teams each. The four top teams advanced to the quarterfinals. The last two teams of each group played for the 9th–12th place.

Team advanced to Quarterfinals
Team competed in 9th–12th playoffs

==== Group E ====
Team	Pld	W	L	PF	PA	PD	Pts	Tiebreaker
Belgium	5	4	1	311	237	+74	9	
Sweden	5	4	1	304	271	+33	9	
Russia	5	4	1	270	251	+19	9	
Greece	5	2	3	278	304	–26	7	
Czech Republic	5	1	4	261	292	–26	6	
Slovakia	5	0	5	281	350	–69	5	

August 15
14:30

Report

Greece	37–55	Belgium
Scoring by quarter: 8-14, 8-12, 6-23, 15-6
Pts: Kalomitsini 10; Rebs: Tsavou 10; Asts: Kyratzi 6		Pts: Abdelkader 16; Rebs: Bernard 9 Asts: Allemand 3

Pala Rockefeller, Cagliari
Attendance: 100

August 15
16:45

Report

Czech Republic	50–53	Sweden
Scoring by quarter: 16-10, 10-18, 14-11, 10-14
Pts: Beránková 13; Rebs: Kanuková 10; Asts: Kanuková, Opocenska 2		Pts: Hanson 15; Rebs: Magarity 15; Asts: Magarity 3

Pala Rockefeller, Cagliari
Attendance: 100

August 15
19:00

Report

Russia	60–53	Slovakia
Scoring by quarter: 13-13, 17-13, 10-18, 20-9
Pts: Ilinova 15; Rebs: Tsukanova 9 Asts: Tsukanova, Chaykovskaya 2		Pts: Dudásová 14; Rebs: Hruscáková 10; Asts: four players 1

Palazzeto Quartu S. Elena, Cagliari
Attendance: 100

August 16
16:45

Report

Slovakia	60–70	Czech Republic
Scoring by quarter: 12-15, 16-15, 14-12, 18-26
Pts: Páleníková 17; Rebs: Hruscáková 15; Asts: Dudásová 5		Pts: Hoskova 15; Rebs: Opocenska 12; Asts: Hoskova 3

Pala Rockefeller, Cagliari
Attendance: 100

August 16
19:00

Report

Belgium	51–36	Russia
Scoring by quarter: 14-6, 7-10, 14-6, 16-14
Pts: Abdelkader 24; Rebs: Nauwelaers 12; Asts: Allemand 5		Pts: Safonova 10; Rebs: Tsukanova 9 Asts: three players 2

Palazzeto Quartu S. Elena, Cagliari
Attendance: 100

August 16
21:15

Report

Sweden	76–60	Greece
Scoring by quarter: 20-8, 27-17, 13-20, 16-15
Pts: Magarity 23; Rebs: three players 7 Asts: Hanson 3		Pts: Kyratzi 18; Rebs: Stamolamprou 6 Asts: Pavlopoulou 5

Palazzeto Quartu S. Elena, Cagliari
Attendance: 110

August 17
19:00

Report

Greece	76–69	Slovakia
Scoring by quarter: 13-19, 26-19, 21-16, 16-15
Pts: Stamolamprou 31; Rebs: Tsavou 15; Asts: Kyratzi, Pavlopoulou 4		Pts: Hruscáková 32; Rebs: Zarevúcka 8 Asts: Matuskova 4

Palazzeto Quartu S. Elena, Cagliari
Attendance: 100

August 17
21:15

Report

Czech Republic	59–75	Belgium
Scoring by quarter: 26-15, 13-21, 10-18, 10-21
Pts: Opocenska 14; Rebs: Opocenska 7 Asts: Hoskova 4		Pts: Abdelkader 22; Rebs: Bernard 8 Asts: Bernard, De Korte 3

Palazzeto Quartu S. Elena, Cagliari
Attendance: 100

August 17
21:15

Report

Russia	62–56	Sweden
Scoring by quarter: 28-15, 11-17, 17-6, 6-18
Pts: Tsukanova 17; Rebs: Komarova, Degtyarskaya 6 Asts: Ilinova 6		Pts: Magarity 17; Rebs: Magarity 11; Asts: three players 3

Pala Rockefeller, Cagliari
Attendance: 100

==== Group F ====
Team	Pld	W	L	PF	PA	PD	Pts	Tiebreaker
Spain	5	5	0	389	193	+196	10	
Italy	5	3	2	278	293	–15	8	1–0
Turkey	5	3	2	252	297	–35	8	0–1
France	5	2	3	283	299	–16	7	1–0
Netherlands	5	2	3	252	289	–37	7	0–1
Hungary	5	0	5	216	305	–89	5	

August 15
19:00

Report

France	51–70	Italy
Scoring by quarter: 16-17, 11-20, 14-16, 10-17
Pts: Koné 13; Rebs: three players 6 Asts: Devillers 5		Pts: Zandalasini 21; Rebs: Ercoli 7 Asts: Marangoni 5

Pala Rockefeller, Cagliari
Attendance: 200

August 15
21:15

Report

Netherlands	46–77	Spain
Scoring by quarter: 9-16, 14-18, 8-20, 15-23
Pts: Guijt 10; Rebs: Hof 7 Asts: Kanbier, Rikhof 2		Pts: Arrojo 21; Rebs: Arrojo 8 Asts: Lizarazu 5

Palazzeto Quartu S. Elena, Cagliari
Attendance: 150

August 15
21:15

Report

Turkey	51–42	Hungary
Scoring by quarter: 13-15, 10-8, 19-10, 9-9
Pts: Coklar 23; Rebs: Coklar 16; Asts: Akbas 4		Pts: Böröndy 9 Rebs: Sikora, Kalocsai 7 Asts: Bodnár 3

Pala Rockefeller, Cagliari
Attendance: 100

August 16
14:30

Report

Spain	72–48	France
Scoring by quarter: 15-8, 21-16, 14-17, 22-7
Pts: Arrojo 14; Rebs: Perez 8 Asts: Arrojo 4		Pts: Koné 16; Rebs: Koné 10; Asts: Mané 2

Pala Rockefeller, Cagliari
Attendance: 150

August 16
19:00

Report

Netherlands	60–37	Hungary
Scoring by quarter: 15-9, 17-9, 19-13, 9-6
Pts: Lammerink 15; Rebs: Kempers 11; Asts: Cornelius, van Veen 3		Pts: Kalocsai 14; Rebs: Sikora 9 Asts: Bodnár, Böröndy 2

Pala Rockefeller, Cagliari
Attendance: 100

August 16
21:15

Report

Italy	67–49	Turkey
Scoring by quarter: 22-15, 7-6, 19-18, 19-10
Pts: Penna 22; Rebs: Ercoli 13; Asts: Penna 3		Pts: Akbas 19; Rebs: Coklar 9 Asts: Akbas 4

Pala Rockefeller, Cagliari
Attendance: 400

August 17
14:30

Report

France	59–54	Hungary
Scoring by quarter: 13-17, 20-3, 12-17, 14-17
Pts: Dinga-Mbomi 13; Rebs: Gaye 12; Asts: Devillers 2		Pts: Kalocsai 14; Rebs: Böröndy, Sikora 7 Asts: Böröndy 4

Pala Rockefeller, Cagliari
Attendance: 50

August 17
16:45

Report

Italy	52–57	Netherlands
Scoring by quarter: 14-25, 15-12, 15-13, 8-7
Pts: Zandalasini 18; Rebs: Ercoli 6 Asts: Marangoni, Penna 3		Pts: Guijt 18; Rebs: Lammerink 8 Asts: Kempers 3

Pala Rockefeller, Cagliari
Attendance: 300

August 17
19:00

Report

Turkey	35–83	Spain
Scoring by quarter: 9-24, 7-21, 9-17, 10-21
Pts: Akbas 9 Rebs: Altunbey 4 Asts: Akbas 3		Pts: three players 12; Rebs: Del Santo 14; Asts: three players 3

Pala Rockefeller, Cagliari
Attendance: 100

=== Classification round ===
The last teams of each group in the preliminary round will compete in this Classification Round. The four teams will play in one group. The last two teams will be relegated to Division B for the next season.

Team will be relegated to Division B.

==== Group G ====
Team	Pld	W	L	PF	PA	PD	Pts	Tiebreaker
Serbia	6	5	1	420	368	+52	11	
Croatia	6	3	3	414	393	+21	9	
Poland	6	3	3	395	385	+10	9	
Finland	6	1	5	326	409	–83	7	

August 15
14:30

Report

Poland	54–69	Serbia
Scoring by quarter: 15-18, 19-11, 12-19, 8-21
Pts: Stankiewicz 13; Rebs: Rembiszewska, Szajtauer 11; Asts: Pisera, Stankiewicz 3		Pts: Mandic 19; Rebs: Crvendakic 11; Asts: Mandic, Milekic 3

Palazzeto Quartu S. Elena, Cagliari
Attendance: 100

August 15
16:45

Report

Croatia	76–47	Finland
Scoring by quarter: 14-14, 27-13, 18-7, 17-13
Pts: Saric 18; Rebs: Chiabov 10; Asts: Butina 5		Pts: Jämsä, Rantanen 10; Rebs: Purhonen 11; Asts: Jämsä 2

Palazzeto Quartu S. Elena, Cagliari
Attendance: 105

August 16
14:30

Report

Finland	45–66	Poland
Scoring by quarter: 15-11, 17-25, 7-19, 6-11
Pts: Jämsä 12; Rebs: Äijänen 10; Asts: Jämsä 3		Pts: Pisera, Buczak 10; Rebs: Szajtauer 12; Asts: Buczak 5

Palazzeto Quartu S. Elena, Cagliari
Attendance: 50

August 16
16:45

Report

Serbia	81–74	Croatia
Scoring by quarter: 21-18, 13-21, 17-16, 30-19
Pts: Mandic 3 Rebs: Mandic 12; Asts: Mandic 6		Pts: Butina 29; Rebs: Chiabov, Bura 9 Asts: Butina 3

Pala Rockefeller, Cagliari
Attendance: 50

August 17
14:30

Report

Finland	56–66	Serbia
Scoring by quarter: 18-18, 5-12, 12-11, -21-25
Pts: Jämsä 16; Rebs: Purhonen 11; Asts: JPurhonen 3		Pts: Mandic 34; Rebs: Crvendakic 11; Asts: Mandic 5

Palazzeto Quartu S. Elena, Cagliari
Attendance: 100

August 17
16:45

Report

Poland	69–72	Croatia
Scoring by quarter: 23-15, 14-12, 16-13, 16-32
Pts: Buczak 20; Rebs: Pobozy 15; Asts: Pisera 3		Pts: Racki 16; Rebs: Chiabov 10; Asts: Butina 10

Palazzeto Quartu S. Elena, Cagliari
Attendance: 100

August 19
14:30

Serbia	62–66	Poland

Palazzeto Quartu S. Elena, Cagliari

August 19
21:15

Finland	61–54	Croatia

Palazzeto Quartu S. Elena, Cagliari

August 20
16:45

Poland	75–59	Finland

Palazzeto Quartu S. Elena, Cagliari

August 20
19:00

Croatia	60–70	Serbia

Palazzeto Quartu S. Elena, Cagliari

August 21
09:45

Serbia	72–58	Finland

Palazzeto Quartu S. Elena, Cagliari

August 21
12:00

Croatia	78–65	Poland

Palazzeto Quartu S. Elena, Cagliari

== Knockout round ==
=== Championship ===
Quarter-finals
August 19 – Cagliari
Belgium	70
France	67
August 19 – Cagliari
Italy	60
Russia	50
August 19 – Cagliari
Spain	75
Greece	28
August 19 – Cagliari
Sweden	53
Turkey	56

Semi-finals
August 20 – Cagliari
Belgium	54
Italy	43
August 20 – Cagliari
Spain	79
Turkey	52

Final
August 21 – Cagliari
Belgium	43
Spain	67
Third place
August 21 – Cagliari
Italy
Turkey

==== Quarterfinals ====
August 19
14:30

Report

Belgium	70–67	France
Scoring by quarter: 16-17, 19-16, 17-14, 18-20
Pts: Ben Abdelkader 18; Rebs: Medjo 9 Asts: Ben Abdelkader 8		Pts: Dinga-Mbomi 20; Rebs: Koné 16; Asts: four players 1

Pala Rockefeller, Cagliari
Attendance: 100

August 19
16:45

Report

Spain	75–28	Greece
Scoring by quarter: 18-9, 18-4, 24-11, 15-4
Pts: Romero 12; Rebs: Romero 9 Asts: Lizarazu 4		Pts: Tsavou 8 Rebs: Tsavou, Stamolamprou 5 Asts: three players 1

Pala Rockefeller, Cagliari
Attendance: 200

August 19
19:00

Report

Sweden	53–56	Turkey
Scoring by quarter: 10-15, 16-13, 17-15, 10-13
Pts: Magarity 18; Rebs: Magarity 18; Asts: Hanson 3		Pts: Akbas 19; Rebs: Coklar 12; Asts: Akbas 4

Pala Rockefeller, Cagliari
Attendance: 200

August 19
21:15

Report

Italy	60–50	Russia
Scoring by quarter: 19-12, 15-15, 12-7, 14-16
Pts: Zandalasini 23; Rebs: Ercoli 8 Asts: Djedjemel, Marangoni 4		Pts: Degtyarskaya 17; Rebs: Fedorova 9 Asts: Komarova 5

Pala Rockefeller, Cagliari
Attendance: 1500

==== Semifinals ====
August 20
19:00

Report

Belgium	54–43	Italy
Scoring by quarter: 12-14, 13-17, 16-6, 13-6
Pts: Ben Abdelkader 29; Rebs: Bernard 12; Asts: Allemand 2		Pts: Penna 14; Rebs: Ercoli, Zandalasini 9 Asts: Marangoni 3

Pala Rockefeller, Cagliari
Attendance: 1200

August 20
21:15

Report

Spain	79–52	Turkey
Scoring by quarter: 20-14, 16-15, 19-8, 24-15
Pts: Arrojo 17; Rebs: Arrojo 10; Asts: Rodriguez 3		Pts: Basaran 13; Rebs: Coklar 8 Asts: three players 2

Pala Rockefeller, Cagliari
Attendance: 300

==== Bronze medal game ====
August 21
19:00

Italy	vs.	Turkey

Pala Rockefeller, Cagliari

==== Final ====
August 21
21:15

Report

Belgium	43–67	Spain
Scoring by quarter: 12-21, 18-12, 9-14, 4-20
Pts: Ben Abdelkader 18; Rebs: Medjo 7 Asts: five players 1		Pts: Arrojo 20; Rebs: Del Santo 15; Asts: Romero 5

Pala Rockefeller, Cagliari
Attendance: 1500
Referees: Carmelo Paternico (ITA), Marius Ciulin (ROU), Carole Delauné (FRA)

=== 5th–8th playoffs ===
Semi-finals
August 20 – Cagliari
France	67
Russia	80
August 20 – Cagliari
Greece	74
Sweden	50

Fifth place
August 21 – Cagliari
Russia	65
Greece	71
Seventh place
August 21 – Cagliari
France	47
Sweden	38

==== 5th–8th semifinals ====
August 20
14:30

Report

Greece	74–50	Sweden
Scoring by quarter: 18-14, 11-16, 25-15, 20-5
Pts: Stamolamprou 30; Rebs: Pavlopoulou 10; Asts: Pavlopoulou 5		Pts: Magarity 14; Rebs: Magarity 7 Asts: three players 3

Pala Rockefeller, Cagliari
Attendance: 100

August 20
16:45

Report

France	67–80 (OT)	Russia
Scoring by quarter: 15-16, 19-15, 18-17, 11-15, Overtime: 4-17
Pts: Koné 18; Rebs: Koné 14; Asts: three players 2		Pts: Tsukanova 15; Rebs: Safonova, Degtyarskaya 6 Asts: Fedorova 2

Pala Rockefeller, Cagliari
Attendance: 100

==== 7th place playoff ====
August 21
14:30

Report

France	47–38	Sweden
Scoring by quarter: 13-11, 18-8, 10-7, 6-12
Pts: Millavet 12; Rebs: Gaye, Koné 11; Asts: Dinga-Mbomi 3		Pts: Magarity 13; Rebs: Magarity 9 Asts: three players 1

Pala Rockefeller, Cagliari
Attendance: 100

==== 5th place playoff ====
August 21
16:45

Russia	65–71	Greece
Scoring by quarter: 15-19, 11-19, 23-21, 16-12

Pala Rockefeller, Cagliari

=== 9th–12th playoffs ===
Semi-finals
August 19 – Cagliari
Czech Republic	65
Hungary	59
August 19 – Cagliari
Netherlands	52
Slovakia	48

Ninth place
August 20 – Cagliari
Czech Republic	49
Netherlands	56
Eleventh place
August 20 – Cagliari
Hungary	47
Slovakia	58

==== 9th–12th semifinals ====
August 19
16:30

Czech Republic	65–59	Hungary

Palazzeto Quartu S. Elena, Cagliari

August 19
19:00

Netherlands	52–48	Slovakia

Palazzeto Quartu S. Elena, Cagliari

==== 11th place playoff ====
August 21
14:30

Hungary	vs.	Slovakia

Palazzeto Quartu S. Elena, Cagliari

==== 9th place playoff ====
August 21
16:45

Czech Republic	vs.	Netherlands

Palazzeto Quartu S. Elena, Cagliari

== Final standings ==
Rank	Team
1st place, gold medalist(s)	Spain
2nd place, silver medalist(s)	Belgium
3rd place, bronze medalist(s)	Italy
4	Turkey
5	Greece
6	Russia
7	France
8	Sweden
9	Netherlands
10	Czech Republic
11	Slovakia
12	Hungary
13	Serbia
14	Croatia
15	Poland
16	Finland

Qualified for the 2012 FIBA Under-17 World Championship for Women
Qualified as the host nation for the 2012 FIBA Under-17 World Championship for Women
Relegated to the 2012 FIBA Europe Under-16 Championship for Women Division B

== Awards ==
2011 FIBA Europe Under-16 Championship for Women winner

Spain
Seventh title

Most Valuable Player
(Belgium) Hind Ben Abdelkader

All-Tournament Team

- (Spain) Leticia Romero
- (Spain) Maria Arrojo
- (Belgium) Hind Ben Abdelkader
- (Italy) Cecilia Zandalasini
- (Turkey) Hulya Coklar
