= Zofia =

Zofia is a Slavic given name of Old Greek origin, meaning wisdom. It is a variant of Sofia. Famous people with the name Zofia:

- Anna Zofia Sapieha (1799–1864), noblewoman and philanthropist
- Maria Zofia Sieniawska (1699–1771), Polish noblewoman
- Zofia Albinowska-Minkiewiczowa (1886–1971), Polish-Ukrainian artist
- Zofia Baltarowicz-Dzielińska (1894–1970), Polish sculptor
- Zofia Branicka (1790–1879), Polish noblewoman and art collector
- Zofia Czartoryska (1778–1837), Polish noblewoman
- Zofia Czeska (1584–1650), Polish nun
- Zofia Grabczan (born 1962), Polish politician
- Zofia Filipowiczowa, Polish woman accused of witchcraft
- Zofia Helman (born 1937), Polish musicologist
- Zofia Hilczer-Kurnatowska (1932-2013), Polish archaeologist
- Žofia Hruščáková (born 1995), Slovak basketball player
- Zofia Jaroszewska (1902–1985), Polish actress
- Zofia Kalucka (born 2002), Polish para-athlete
- Zofia Kielan-Jaworowska (1925–2015), Polish paleobiologist
- Zofia Kisielew
- Zofia Kossak-Szczucka (1890–1968), Polish writer and resistance fighter
- Zofia Krasińska (died 1640s)
- Zofia Kulik (born 1947), Polish artist
- Zofia Licharewa (1883–1980), Polish geologist and museum founder
- Zofia Lissa (1908–1980), Polish musicologist
- Zofia Lubomirska (1718–1790), Polish noblewoman and landowner
- Zofia Nałkowska (1884–1954), Polish writer
- Zofia Nehringowa (1910–1972), Polish long track speed skater
- Zofia Nowakowska (born 1988), Polish singer
- Zofia Odrowąż (1537–1580), Polish noblewoman
- Zofia Ostrogska (1595–1622), Polish-Lithuanian noblewoman
- Zofia Potocka (1760–1822), Polish noblewoman
- Zofia Romer (1885–1972), Polish-Lithuanian painter
- Zofia Tarnowska (1534–1570), Polish-Lithuanian noblewoman
- Zofia Teofillia Daniłowicz (1607–1661), Polish noblewoman
- Zofia Weigl (1885–1940), Polish biologist
- Zofia Zakrzewska (1916–1999), Polish scoutmaster
- Zofia Zamoyska (1607–1661)
- Zofia Zdybicka (1928–2026), Polish nun
