= Motal Selsoviet =

Motal Selsoviet Мотальскі сельсавет (Belarusian) Мотольский сельсовет (Russian)
- Administrative center: Motal
- Established: 1954

Government
  - Chairman: Eteri Ptashyts

Population (2008)
  - Total: 5,662

Motal Selsoviet (Russian: Мотольский сельский Совет; Belarusian: Мотальскі сельскі Савет) is a rural council in the territory of the Ivanava District, Brest Region of Belarus.

The administrative center is Motal. As of 2016, chairman of selsoviet is a Sergey Pilipovich.

== Composition ==
- Motal (Capital)
- Tyškavičy

== History ==
- October 12, 1940 established Dedavitski Selsoviet as part of the Ivanava District Pinsk area.
- July 16, 1954 the village council renamed the Motal.
