= 2015 FIBA Europe Under-16 Championship for Women =

2015 FIBA U16 Women's European Championship
27th FIBA Under-16 Women's European Basketball Championship

Tournament details
- Host country: Portugal
- Dates: 13–23 August 2015
- Teams: 16 (from 1 confederation)
- Venues: 2 (in 1 host city)

Final positions
- Champions: Czech Republic (1st title)

Tournament statistics
- MVP: (Portugal) Ana Ramos
- Top scorer: (Russia) Ogun (16.6)
- Top rebounds: (Germany) Sabally (12.9)
- Top assists: (Portugal) Ramos (4.4)
- PPG (Team): Hungary (70.3)
- RPG (Team): Czech Rep. (43.8)
- APG (Team): Hungary (14.4)

Official website
- FIBA Archive

The 2015 FIBA Europe Under-16 Championship for Women was the 27th edition of the European championship for women's national under-16 basketball teams. A total of 16 teams participated in the competition, which took place in Matosinhos, Portugal, from 13 to 23 August 2015.

The champions were Czech Republic, who defeated Portugal 79–55 to secure their first title in this competition, after being losing finalists in the previous two editions. Portugal achieved their best-ever result in an international basketball competition, having never reached the quarterfinals at this age level. The host nation's Ana Ramos was named the tournament's MVP and selected for the tournament's All-Star Five.

== Participating teams ==
- Belgium
- Croatia
- Czech Republic
- England ▲ (Runners-up, 2014 FIBA Europe Under-16 Championship for Women Division B)
- France
- Germany ▲ (Winners, 2014 FIBA Europe Under-16 Championship for Women Division B)
- Hungary
- Italy
- Latvia
- Netherlands ▲ (3rd place, 2014 FIBA Europe Under-16 Championship for Women Division B)
- Portugal
- Russia
- Serbia
- Slovakia
- Spain
- Turkey

== First round ==
The first-round groups draw took place on 30 November 2014 in Budapest, Hungary. In the first round, the sixteen teams are allocated in four groups of four teams each. The top three teams of each group will qualify to the Second Round. The last team of each group will play in the Classification Group G first, then in the 9th–16th place playoffs.

| Team advances to the Second round |
| Team will compete in the Classification Group G |

=== Group A ===
| Pos | Team | Pld | W | L | PF | PA | PD | Pts | Qualification |
|---|---|---|---|---|---|---|---|---|---|
| 1 | Italy | 3 | 3 | 0 | 177 | 142 | +35 | 6 | Advance to second round |
| 2 | Czech Republic | 3 | 2 | 1 | 168 | 144 | +24 | 5 | Advance to second round |
| 3 | Turkey | 3 | 1 | 2 | 165 | 197 | −32 | 4 | Advance to second round |
| 4 | Netherlands | 3 | 0 | 3 | 166 | 193 | −27 | 3 | Classification Group G |

Source: FIBA Archive

13 August 2015
16:15

Boxscore

| Netherlands | 54–62 | Czech Republic |
Scoring by quarter: 13-20, 11-13, 12-16, 18-13
| Pts: van Vlijmen 17; Rebs: Droste, Slagter 8 Asts: Driessen 3 | | Pts: Vitulová 15; Rebs: Sipová 14; Asts: Pospisilová, Sotolová 3 |

Centro de Desportos e Congressos de Matosinhos, Matosinhos (POR)
Attendance: 300
Referees: Luis Miguel Castillo Larroca (ESP), Peter Papp (HUN), Andrada Monika Csender (ROU)

13 August 2015
18:30

Boxscore

| Italy | 64–57 | Turkey |
Scoring by quarter: 21-9, 13-14, 13-21, 17-13
| Pts: Madera 13; Rebs: Trucco, Madera 7 Asts: Madera 2 | | Pts: Yildizhan 14; Rebs: Güclü 10; Asts: Sahin 3 |

Centro de Desportos e Congressos de Matosinhos, Matosinhos (POR)
Attendance: 500
Referees: Robert Lottermoser (GER), Zoran Sutulovic (MNE), Ivana Ivanovic (SRB)

14 August 2015
14:00

Boxscore

| Czech Republic | 40–53 | Italy |
Scoring by quarter: 9-9, 12-16, 13-13, 6-15
| Pts: Sipová 11; Rebs: 3 players 5 Asts: Pospisilová 3 | | Pts: Cubaj 22; Rebs: Pinzan, Trucco 8 Asts: Pinzan 3 |

Pavilhao Municipal de Guiföes, Matosinhos (POR)
Attendance: 150
Referees: Radomir Vojinovic (MNE), Robert Lottermoser (GER), Peter Papp (HUN)

14 August 2015
16:15

Boxscore

| Turkey | 71–67 | Netherlands |
Scoring by quarter: 18-15, 13-17, 24-24, 16-11
| Pts: Güclü 21; Rebs: Yildizhan 16; Asts: Sahin 6 | | Pts: Kuijt, van Vlijmen 16; Rebs: Droste 10; Asts: Kuijt, Fleuren 3 |

Pavilhao Municipal de Guiföes, Matosinhos (POR)
Attendance: 100
Referees: Marcin Kowalski (POL), Juris Kokainis (LAT), Regis Bardera (FRA)

15 August 2015
14:00

Boxscore

| Italy | 60–45 | Netherlands |
Scoring by quarter: 11-14, 20-11, 10-9, 19-11
| Pts: Trucco 14; Rebs: Trucco 10; Asts: 6 players 1 | | Pts: Kuijt 9 Rebs: Droste, Peek 9 Asts: Fleuren 3 |

Centro de Desportos e Congressos de Matosinhos, Matosinhos (POR)
Attendance: 100
Referees: Mykola Ambrosov (UKR), Marcin Kowalski (POL), Martin Horozov (BUL)

15 August 2015
16:15

Boxscore

| Czech Republic | 66–37 | Turkey |
Scoring by quarter: 17-11, 22-7, 17-7, 10-12
| Pts: Pospisilová 17; Rebs: Pospisilová 9 Asts: Pospisilová 3 | | Pts: Güclü 7 Rebs: 3 players 4 Asts: Güclü 2 |

Centro de Desportos e Congressos de Matosinhos, Matosinhos (POR)
Attendance: 100
Referees: Zoran Sutulovic (MNE), Radomir Vojinovic (MNE), Ivana Ivanovic (SRB)

=== Group B ===
| Pos | Team | Pld | W | L | PF | PA | PD | Pts | Qualification |
|---|---|---|---|---|---|---|---|---|---|
| 1 | Russia | 3 | 3 | 0 | 202 | 136 | +66 | 6 | Advance to second round |
| 2 | Portugal | 3 | 2 | 1 | 172 | 165 | +7 | 5 | Advance to second round |
| 3 | Slovakia | 3 | 1 | 2 | 150 | 191 | −41 | 4 | Advance to second round |
| 4 | Croatia | 3 | 0 | 3 | 168 | 200 | −32 | 3 | Classification Group G |

Source: FIBA Archive

13 August 2015
14:00

Boxscore

| Croatia | 58–63 | Slovakia |
Scoring by quarter: 15-13, 18-11, 15-19, 10-20
| Pts: Tadic 13; Rebs: Pavic 11; Asts: Erjavec 3 | | Pts: Balázová 19; Rebs: Mikulasikova 9 Asts: Fehérová 4 |

Pavilhao Municipal de Guiföes, Matosinhos (POR)
Attendance: 67
Referees: Regis Bardera (FRA), Martin Horozov (BUL), Marcin Kowalski (POL)

13 August 2015
21:15

Boxscore

| Portugal | 45–59 | Russia |
Scoring by quarter: 14-17, 6-13, 13-11, 12-18
| Pts: Cabral 15; Rebs: Lopes Serranho 6 Asts: Lopes Serranho 2 | | Pts: Ogun 21; Rebs: Zarubina, Kazhlaeva 7 Asts: Ogun, Kazhlaeva 2 |

Centro de Desportos e Congressos de Matosinhos, Matosinhos (POR)
Attendance: 2000
Referees: Juris Kokainis (LAT), Radomir Vojinovic (MNE), Mykola Ambrosov (UKR)

14 August 2015
18:30

Boxscore

| Russia | 75–49 | Croatia |
Scoring by quarter: 23-10, 24-9, 14-12, 14-18
| Pts: Ogun 20; Rebs: Zarubina 8 Asts: Kazhlaeva 6 | | Pts: Skoric 13; Rebs: Vojtulek 10; Asts: 5 players 1 |

Pavilhao Municipal de Guiföes, Matosinhos (POR)
Attendance: 100
Referees: Zoran Sutulovic (MNE), Andrada Monika Csender (ROU), Ivana Ivanovic (SRB)

14 August 2015
20:45

Boxscore

| Slovakia | 45–65 | Portugal |
Scoring by quarter: 5-20, 17-17, 10-13, 13-15
| Pts: Balázová 11; Rebs: Mikulasikova, Fehérová 7 Asts: Kovacikova 3 | | Pts: Silva 17; Rebs: Jordao 9 Asts: Ramos, Jordao 4 |

Centro de Desportos e Congressos de Matosinhos, Matosinhos (POR)
Attendance: 2000
Referees: Sinisa Herceg (CRO), Stanislav Kucera (CZE), Özlem Yalman (TUR)

15 August 2015
18:30

Boxscore

| Russia | 68–42 | Slovakia |
Scoring by quarter: 28-10, 13-9, 15-14, 12-9
| Pts: Ogun 15; Rebs: Kozhukhar 8 Asts: Kazhlaeva 5 | | Pts: Kovacikova 9 Rebs: Mikulasikova 8 Asts: Gajdosová 4 |

Pavilhao Municipal de Guiföes, Matosinhos (POR)
Attendance: 80
Referees: Juris Kokainis (LAT), Regis Bardera (FRA), Peter Papp (HUN)

15 August 2015
20:45

Boxscore

| Croatia | 61–62 | Portugal |
Scoring by quarter: 18-18, 20-8, 14-17, 9-19
| Pts: Katavic 12; Rebs: Katavic 7 Asts: Tadic 2 | | Pts: Cabral 12; Rebs: Jordao 9 Asts: Jordao, Ramos 4 |

Centro de Desportos e Congressos de Matosinhos, Matosinhos (POR)
Attendance: 2000
Referees: Robert Lottermoser (GER), Andrada Monika Csender (ROU), Luis Miguel Castillo Larroca (ESP)

=== Group C ===
| Pos | Team | Pld | W | L | PF | PA | PD | Pts | Qualification |
|---|---|---|---|---|---|---|---|---|---|
| 1 | France | 3 | 3 | 0 | 175 | 149 | +26 | 6 | Advance to second round |
| 2 | Germany | 3 | 2 | 1 | 163 | 151 | +12 | 5 | Advance to second round |
| 3 | Belgium | 3 | 1 | 2 | 154 | 162 | −8 | 4 | Advance to second round |
| 4 | Serbia | 3 | 0 | 3 | 143 | 173 | −30 | 3 | Classification Group G |

Source: FIBA Archive

13 August 2015
16:15

Boxscore

| Germany | 51–58 | France |
Scoring by quarter: 17-11, 6-9, 15-19, 13-19
| Pts: Tzokov 13; Rebs: Sabally 7 Asts: Daub 4 | | Pts: Jeanneaux 16; Rebs: Mbandu 7 Asts: Tahane 3 |

Pavilhao Municipal de Guiföes, Matosinhos (POR)
Attendance: 300
Referees: Stanislav Kucera (CZE), Sinisa Herceg (CRO), Özlem Yalman (TUR)

13 August 2015
18:30

Boxscore

| Belgium | 60–46 | Serbia |
Scoring by quarter: 12-5, 14-12, 22-17, 12-12
| Pts: Borlée, Devos 14; Rebs: Massey 8 Asts: Devos 3 | | Pts: Djordjevic 11; Rebs: Jelic 6 Asts: Katanic, Djordjevic 2 |

Pavilhao Municipal de Guiföes, Matosinhos (POR)
Attendance: 200
Referees: Aliaksandr Syrytsa (BLR), Igor Mitrovski (MKD), Damir Kunosic (BIH)

14 August 2015
14:00

Boxscore

| France | 60–48 | Belgium |
Scoring by quarter: 18-8, 17-10, 12-16, 13-14
| Pts: Sissoko 19; Rebs: Mbandu 10; Asts: Pouye 4 | | Pts: Massey 16; Rebs: Massey 4 Asts: 3 players 2 |

Centro de Desportos e Congressos de Matosinhos, Matosinhos (POR)
Referees: Bojan Jovanic (BIH), Zdenko Zubak (SVK), Sonia Teixeira (POR)

14 August 2015
16:15

Boxscore

| Serbia | 47–56 | Germany |
Scoring by quarter: 12-14, 9-17, 16-8, 10-17
| Pts: Turudic 12; Rebs: Katanic, Turudic 7 Asts: Katanic 7 | | Pts: Tzokov 17; Rebs: Sabally 17; Asts: Daub 3 |

Centro de Desportos e Congressos de Matosinhos, Matosinhos (POR)
Referees: Omer Esteron (ISR), Vasiliki Tsaroucha (GRE), Sergey Krug (RUS)

15 August 2015
14:00

Boxscore

| Belgium | 46–56 | Germany |
Scoring by quarter: 9-9, 9-19, 10-13, 18-15
| Pts: Borlée 19; Rebs: Massey 6 Asts: 4 players 2 | | Pts: Schiffer 14; Rebs: Sabally 13; Asts: Storzyk 4 |

Pavilhao Municipal de Guiföes, Matosinhos (POR)
Attendance: 200
Referees: Sinisa Herceg (CRO), Igor Mitrovski (MKD), Aliaksandr Syrytsa (BLR)

15 August 2015
16:15

Boxscore

| France | 57–50 | Serbia |
Scoring by quarter: 17-12, 18-13, 12-13, 10-12
| Pts: Mbaye, Tahane 9 Rebs: Sissoko 8 Asts: Bretagne 6 | | Pts: Naumcev 16; Rebs: Naumcev 9 Asts: Djordjevic, Vulovic 2 |

Pavilhao Municipal de Guiföes, Matosinhos (POR)
Attendance: 240
Referees: Stanislav Kucera (CZE), Özlem Yalman (TUR), Omer Esteron (ISR)

=== Group D ===
| Pos | Team | Pld | W | L | PF | PA | PD | Pts | Qualification |
|---|---|---|---|---|---|---|---|---|---|
| 1 | Hungary | 3 | 3 | 0 | 235 | 157 | +78 | 6 | Advance to second round |
| 2 | Spain | 3 | 2 | 1 | 184 | 162 | +22 | 5 | Advance to second round |
| 3 | Latvia | 3 | 1 | 2 | 200 | 199 | +1 | 4 | Advance to second round |
| 4 | England | 3 | 0 | 3 | 100 | 201 | −101 | 3 | Classification Group G |

Source: FIBA Archive

13 August 2015
14:00

Boxscore

| Hungary | 86–69 | Latvia |
Scoring by quarter: 16-19, 18-13, 23-17, 29-20
| Pts: Lelik 23; Rebs: Juhász 13; Asts: Gereben 7 | | Pts: Rozentale, Septe 15; Rebs: Gulbe 9 Asts: Septe 3 |

Centro de Desportos e Congressos de Matosinhos, Matosinhos (POR)
Attendance: 200
Referees: Zdenko Zubak (SVK), Sergey Krug (RUS), Vasiliki Tsaroucha (GRE)

13 August 2015
20:45

Boxscore

| England | 27–56 | Spain |
Scoring by quarter: 14-11, 8-15, 3-19, 2-11
| Pts: Winterburn, Lawal 4 Rebs: Ozzy-Momodu 13; Asts: Lozzi 3 | | Pts: N.Rodriguez 14; Rebs: Galeron 8 Asts: 3 players 3 |

Pavilhao Municipal de Guiföes, Matosinhos (POR)
Attendance: 200
Referees: Omer Esteron (ISR), Bojan Jovanic (BIH), Sonia Teixeira (POR)

14 August 2015
18:30

Boxscore

| Spain | 60–81 | Hungary |
Scoring by quarter: 17-20, 16-20, 15-19, 12-22
| Pts: Galeron 15; Rebs: L.Rodriguez 5 Asts: Gonzalez, N.Rodriguez 3 | | Pts: Juhász 27; Rebs: Juhász, Lelik 7 Asts: Gereben 6 |

Centro de Desportos e Congressos de Matosinhos, Matosinhos (POR)
Attendance: 500
Referees: Igor Mitrovski (MKD), Aliaksandr Syrytsa (BLR), Damir Kunosic (BIH)

14 August 2015
20:45

Boxscore

| Latvia | 77–45 | England |
Scoring by quarter: 28-5, 24-16, 16-7, 9-17
| Pts: Septe 18; Rebs: Lipe 8 Asts: 5 players 1 | | Pts: Jump 20; Rebs: Ozzy-Momodu 10; Asts: Lozzi, Winterburn 2 |

Pavilhao Municipal de Guiföes, Matosinhos (POR)
Attendance: 100
Referees: Luis Miguel Castillo Larroca (ESP), Mykola Ambrosov (UKR), Martin Horozov (BUL)

15 August 2015
18:30

Boxscore

| Hungary | 68–28 | England |
Scoring by quarter: 18-8, 16-7, 14-7, 20-6
| Pts: Boros 13; Rebs: 3 players 6 Asts: Foitl 5 | | Pts: Ozzy-Momodu 9 Rebs: Ozzy-Momodu 9 Asts: 3 players 1 |

Centro de Desportos e Congressos de Matosinhos, Matosinhos (POR)
Attendance: 300
Referees: Damir Kunosic (BIH), Vasiliki Tsaroucha (GRE), Sergey Krug (RUS)

15 August 2015
20:45

Boxscore

| Spain | 68–54 | Latvia |
Scoring by quarter: 24-18, 13-14, 15-11, 16-11
| Pts: N.Rodriguez 15; Rebs: Gonzalez 10; Asts: Ayuso 6 | | Pts: Gulbe 15; Rebs: Gulbe, Karkle 10; Asts: Ozola 3 |

Pavilhao Municipal de Guiföes, Matosinhos (POR)
Attendance: 150
Referees: Bojan Jovanic (BIH), Sonia Teixeira (POR), Zdenko Zubak (SVK)

== Second round ==
Twelve advancing teams from the First Round will be allocated in two groups of six teams each. The top four teams of each group will advance to the quarterfinals. The last two teams of each group will play for the 9th – 16th places against the teams from the Group G.

| Team advances to the Quarterfinals |
| Team will compete in the 9th – 16th place playoffs |

=== Group E ===
| Pos | Team | Pld | W | L | PF | PA | PD | Pts | Qualification |
|---|---|---|---|---|---|---|---|---|---|
| 1 | Italy | 5 | 5 | 0 | 308 | 254 | +54 | 10 | Advance to Quarterfinals |
| 2 | Russia | 5 | 4 | 1 | 326 | 263 | +63 | 9 | Advance to Quarterfinals |
| 3 | Czech Republic | 5 | 3 | 2 | 301 | 276 | +25 | 8 | Advance to Quarterfinals |
| 4 | Portugal | 5 | 2 | 3 | 287 | 281 | +6 | 7 | Advance to Quarterfinals |
| 5 | Turkey | 5 | 1 | 4 | 269 | 345 | −76 | 6 | 9th – 16th place playoffs |
| 6 | Slovakia | 5 | 0 | 5 | 269 | 341 | −72 | 5 | 9th – 16th place playoffs |

Source: FIBA Archive

17 August 2015
16:15

Boxscore

| Slovakia | 59–75 | Italy |
Scoring by quarter: 18-15, 12-24, 20-20, 9-16
| Pts: Fehérová 17; Rebs: Mikulasikova 7 Asts: Balázová, Fehérová 3 | | Pts: Pinzan 20; Rebs: Trucco, Madera 8 Asts: 3 players 3 |

Pavilhao Municipal de Guiföes, Matosinhos (POR)
Attendance: 200
Referees: Omer Esteron (ISR), Andrada Monika Csender (ROU), Mykola Ambrosov (UKR)

17 August 2015
20:45

Boxscore

| Portugal | 55–70 | Czech Republic |
Scoring by quarter: 16-14, 17-20, 7-22, 15-14
| Pts: Ramos 12; Rebs: Ramalho Chermiti, Jordao 8 Asts: Ramos 4 | | Pts: Sipová 30; Rebs: Pospisilová, Sipová 8 Asts: Sipová 2 |

Pavilhao Municipal de Guiföes, Matosinhos (POR)
Attendance: 2500
Referees: Robert Lottermoser (GER), Zoran Sutulovic (MNE), Vasiliki Tsaroucha (GRE)

17 August 2015
20:45

Boxscore

| Turkey | 47–70 | Russia |
Scoring by quarter: 20-14, 11-12, 2-22, 14-22
| Pts: Yildizhan 18; Rebs: Güclü 9 Asts: Sahin 3 | | Pts: Zarubina 15; Rebs: Zarubina 7 Asts: Kazhlaeva 4 |

Pavilhao Municipal de Guiföes, Matosinhos (POR)
Attendance: 50
Referees: Igor Mitrovski (MKD), Radomir Vojinovic (MNE), Martin Horozov (BUL)

18 August 2015
16:15

Boxscore

| Slovakia | 65–69 | Turkey |
Scoring by quarter: 21-19, 13-18, 13-10, 18-22
| Pts: Kovacikova 20; Rebs: Mikulasikova 9 Asts: Kovacikova 5 | | Pts: Yildizhan 22; Rebs: Yildizhan 13; Asts: Sahin 4 |

Centro de Desportos e Congressos de Matosinhos, Matosinhos (POR)
Attendance: 200
Referees: Igor Mitrovski (MKD), Marcin Kowalski (POL), Ivana Ivanovic (SRB)

18 August 2015
18:30

Boxscore

| Czech Republic | 61–73 | Russia |
Scoring by quarter: 23-21, 4-24, 15-17, 19-11
| Pts: Kopecká, Sipová 10; Rebs: Sipová 5 Asts: Pospisilová 4 | | Pts: Ogun 20; Rebs: Repnikova 8 Asts: Kazhlaeva, Kozhukhar 3 |

Centro de Desportos e Congressos de Matosinhos, Matosinhos (POR)
Attendance: 400
Referees: Özlem Yalman (TUR), Aliaksandr Syrytsa (BLR), Regis Bardera (FRA)

18 August 2015
20:45

Boxscore

| Italy | 48–42 | Portugal |
Scoring by quarter: 16-6, 11-11, 16-10, 5-15
| Pts: Pinzan 10; Rebs: Madera 11; Asts: Pinzan 5 | | Pts: Silva 18; Rebs: Jordao 9 Asts: 7 players 1 |

Centro de Desportos e Congressos de Matosinhos, Matosinhos (POR)
Attendance: 2500
Referees: Zdenko Zubak (SVK), Sinisa Herceg (CRO), Damir Kunosic (BIH)

19 August 2015
16:15

Boxscore

| Russia | 56–68 | Italy |
Scoring by quarter: 14-19, 14-18, 10-19, 18-12
| Pts: Ogun 11; Rebs: Ogun, Kozhukhar 7 Asts: Kazhlaeva 3 | | Pts: Cubaj 13; Rebs: Trucco 8 Asts: Pinzan 4 |

Pavilhao Municipal de Guiföes, Matosinhos (POR)
Attendance: 100
Referees: Robert Lottermoser (GER), Vasiliki Tsaroucha (GRE), Stanislav Kucera (CZE)

19 August 2015
18:30

Boxscore

| Czech Republic | 64–58 | Slovakia |
Scoring by quarter: 23-10, 5-10, 14-21, 22-17
| Pts: Pospisilová, Sotolová 13; Rebs: Kopecká 8 Asts: Szcotková, Sotolová 2 | | Pts: Fehérová 20; Rebs: Mikulasikova 10; Asts: Fehérová, Kovacikova 2 |

Pavilhao Municipal de Guiföes, Matosinhos (POR)
Attendance: 100
Referees: Sonia Teixeira (POR), Omer Esteron (ISR), Peter Papp (HUN)

19 August 2015
20:45

Boxscore

| Portugal | 80–59 | Turkey |
Scoring by quarter: 29-19, 22-11, 19-16, 10-13
| Pts: Ramos 19; Rebs: Ramos 8 Asts: Ramos 5 | | Pts: Güclü 19; Rebs: Güclü 7 Asts: Sahin, Yildizhan 3 |

Pavilhao Municipal de Guiföes, Matosinhos (POR)
Attendance: 4000
Referees: Juris Kokainis (LAT), Sergey Krug (RUS), Radomir Vojinovic (MNE)

=== Group F ===
| Pos | Team | Pld | W | L | PF | PA | PD | Pts | Qualification |
|---|---|---|---|---|---|---|---|---|---|
| 1 | France | 5 | 5 | 0 | 273 | 248 | +25 | 10 | Advance to Quarterfinals |
| 2 | Hungary | 5 | 4 | 1 | 370 | 288 | +82 | 9 | Advance to Quarterfinals |
| 3 | Spain | 5 | 3 | 2 | 311 | 278 | +33 | 8 | Advance to Quarterfinals |
| 4 | Latvia | 5 | 2 | 3 | 304 | 300 | +4 | 7 | Advance to Quarterfinals |
| 5 | Germany | 5 | 1 | 4 | 252 | 313 | −61 | 6 | 9th – 16th place playoffs |
| 6 | Belgium | 5 | 0 | 5 | 242 | 325 | −83 | 5 | 9th – 16th place playoffs |

Source: FIBA Archive

17 August 2015
16:15

Boxscore

| Latvia | 51–52 | France |
Scoring by quarter: 14-13, 13-10, 7-15, 17-14
Scoring by half: 27-23
| Pts: Gulbe 18; Rebs: Lipe 5 Asts: Septe 4 | | Pts: Pouye 13; Rebs: Tahane 7 Asts: Tahane 3 |

Centro de Desportos e Congressos de Matosinhos, Matosinhos (POR)
Attendance: 150
Referees: Marcin Kowalski (POL), Sergey Krug (RUS), Sonia Teixeira (POR)

17 August 2015
18:30

Boxscore

| Belgium | 60–83 | Hungary |
Scoring by quarter: 15-18, 15-24, 14-20, 16-21
Scoring by half: 30-42
| Pts: Devos 17; Rebs: Descamps 5 Asts: Bastin 5 | | Pts: Juhász 26; Rebs: Juhász 11; Asts: Czukor, Gereben 4 |

Centro de Desportos e Congressos de Matosinhos, Matosinhos (POR)
Attendance: 100
Referees: Zdenko Zubak (SVK), Damir Kunošić (BIH), Ivana Ivanović (SRB)

17 August 2015
18:30

Boxscore

| Spain | 74–45 | Germany |
Scoring by quarter: 19-16, 14-12, 20-11, 21-6
Scoring by half: 33-28
| Pts: Valino 10; Rebs: Lopez Gonzalez, Galeron 6 Asts: Prieto 4 | | Pts: Tzokov 11; Rebs: Sabally 12; Asts: Sabally 3 |

Centro de Desportos e Congressos de Matosinhos, Matosinhos (POR)
Attendance: 400
Referees: Siniša Herceg (CRO), Bojan Jovanić (BIH), Stanislav Kučera (CZE)

18 August 2015
16:15

Boxscore

| Latvia | 66–42 | Belgium |
Scoring by quarter: 15-15, 20-9, 12-13, 19-5
Scoring by half: 35-24
| Pts: Gulbe 17; Rebs: Rozentale, Septe 8 Asts: Septe 4 | | Pts: Be.Massey 11; Rebs: Bastin 5 Asts: Bastin 3 |

Pavilhao Municipal de Guiföes, Matosinhos (POR)
Attendance: 500
Referees: Vasiliki Tsaroucha (GRE), Omer Esteron (ISR), Peter Papp (HUN)

18 August 2015
18:30

Boxscore

| France | 52–49 | Spain |
Scoring by quarter: 11-21, 19-5, 16-17, 6-6
| Pts: Fofana 11; Rebs: Sissoko 8 Asts: 4 players 1 | | Pts: Galeron 14; Rebs: Prieto 6 Asts: Gonzalez 4 |

Pavilhao Municipal de Guiföes, Matosinhos (POR)
Attendance: 100
Referees: Juris Kokainis (LAT), Bojan Jovanić (BIH), Zoran Sutulović (MNE)

18 August 2015
20:45

Boxscore

| Germany | 48–71 | Hungary |
Scoring by quarter: 13-21, 8-17, 13-12, 14-21
Scoring by half: 21-38
| Pts: Sabally 12; Rebs: Sabally 9 Asts: Geiselsöder 4 | | Pts: Lelik 14; Rebs: Lelik, Soós 7 Asts: Lelik 5 |

Pavilhao Municipal de Guiföes, Matosinhos (POR)
Attendance: 100
Referees: Luis Miguel Castillo Larroca (ESP), Radomir Vojinović (MNE), Martin Horozov (BUL)

19 August 2015
16:15

Boxscore

| Hungary | 49–51 | France |
Scoring by quarter: 17-13, 13-6, 7-17, 12-15
Scoring by half: 30-19
| Pts: Juhász 16; Rebs: Czukor 7 Asts: Lelik 5 | | Pts: Pouye 12; Rebs: Mbandu 11; Asts: Bretagne 4 |

Centro de Desportos e Congressos de Matosinhos, Matosinhos (POR)
Attendance: 500
Referees: Igor Mitrovski (MKD), Andrada Monika Csender (ROU), Marcin Kowalski (POL)

19 August 2015
18:30

Boxscore

| Germany | 52–64 | Latvia |
Scoring by quarter: 10-17, 10-6, 13-14, 19-27
Scoring by half: 20-23
| Pts: Schiffer 11; Rebs: Sabally 16; Asts: Furman 3 | | Pts: Septe 15; Rebs: Karkle, Gulbe 7 Asts: 3 players 3 |

Centro de Desportos e Congressos de Matosinhos, Matosinhos (POR)
Attendance: 100
Referees: Damir Kunosic (BIH), Regis Bardera (FRA), Zoran Sutulovic (MNE)

19 August 2015
20:45

Boxscore

| Spain | 60–46 | Belgium |
Scoring by quarter: 13-7, 18-9, 16-14, 13-16
Scoring by half: 31-16
| Pts: Rodriguez 9 Rebs: Serrat 9 Asts: Gonzalez 4 | | Pts: Lukusa 14; Rebs: Bi.Massey 8 Asts: Bastin 5 |

Centro de Desportos e Congressos de Matosinhos, Matosinhos (POR)
Attendance: 150
Referees: Mykola Ambrosov (UKR), Sinisa Herceg (CRO), Özlem Yalman (TUR)

== Classification Group G ==
The last team of each group of the First Round will compete in this Classification Round.

| Pos | Team | Pld | W | L | PF | PA | PD | Pts |
|---|---|---|---|---|---|---|---|---|
| 1 | Croatia | 3 | 3 | 0 | 200 | 135 | +65 | 6 |
| 2 | Serbia | 3 | 2 | 1 | 196 | 197 | −1 | 5 |
| 3 | Netherlands | 3 | 1 | 2 | 180 | 196 | −16 | 4 |
| 4 | England | 3 | 0 | 3 | 152 | 200 | −48 | 3 |

Source: FIBA Archive

17 August 2015
14:00

Boxscore

| Netherlands | 76–57 | England |
Scoring by quarter: 21-12, 18-22, 20-11, 17-12
Scoring by half: 39-34
| Pts: Peek 16; Rebs: Peek 10; Asts: van Vlijmen 7 | | Pts: Lozzi 10; Rebs: Ozzy-Momodu 15; Asts: Winterburn, Popovic 3 |

Pavilhao Municipal de Guiföes, Matosinhos - Grande Porto (POR)
Attendance: 100
Referees: Regis Bardera (FRA), Aliaksandr Syrytsa (BLR), Özlem Yalman (TUR)

17 August 2015
14:00

Boxscore

| Croatia | 74–59 | Serbia |
Scoring by quarter: 22-8, 19-15, 17-20, 16-16
Scoring by half: 41-23
| Pts: Tadic 14; Rebs: Mrdalj 9 Asts: Erjavec 2 | | Pts: Turudic 12; Rebs: Turudic 10; Asts: Turudic 3 |

Centro de Desportos e Congressos de Matosinhos, Matosinhos - Grande Porto (POR)
Attendance: 100
Referees: Luis Miguel Castillo Larroca (ESP), Juris Kokainis (LAT), Peter Papp (HUN)

18 August 2015
14:00

Boxscore

| Serbia | 67–58 | Netherlands |
Scoring by quarter: 14-12, 13-21, 19-11, 21-14
| Pts: Katanic 15; Rebs: Djordjevic 9 Asts: Katanic 5 | | Pts: Peek 12; Rebs: Slagter 9 Asts: van Vlijmen 4 |

Centro de Desportos e Congressos de Matosinhos, Matosinhos - Grande Porto (POR)
Attendance: 400
Referees: Robert Lottermoser (GER), Sonia Teixeira (POR), Mykola Ambrosov (UKR)

18 August 2015
14:00

Boxscore

| England | 30–54 | Croatia |
Scoring by quarter: 3-18, 6-18, 7-13, 14- 5
Scoring by half: 9-36
| Pts: Jump, Winterburn 8 Rebs: Winterburn 8 Asts: Winterburn 4 | | Pts: Pavic 14; Rebs: Ivancevic 8 Asts: Erjavec 3 |

Pavilhao Municipal de Guiföes, Matosinhos - Grande Porto (POR)
Attendance: 100
Referees: Andrada Monika Csender (ROU), Stanislav Kučera (CZE), Sergey Krug (RUS)

19 August 2015
14:00

Boxscore

| Netherlands | 46–72 | Croatia |
Scoring by quarter: 16-23, 16-16, 4-19, 10-14
| Pts: van Vlijmen 9 Rebs: Droste 8 Asts: van Vlijmen, Fleuren 2 | | Pts: Katavic, Tadic 14; Rebs: Pavic, Vojtulek 8 Asts: Lazic 3 |

Pavilhao Municipal de Guiföes, Matosinhos - Grande Porto (POR)
Attendance: 200
Referees: Ivana Ivanovic (SRB), Bojan Jovanic (BIH), Zdenko Zubak (SVK)

19 August 2015
14:00

Boxscore

| Serbia | 70–65 | England |
Scoring by quarter: 20-11, 22-14, 13-18, 15-22
| Pts: Dimitrijevic 20; Rebs: Vulovic 8 Asts: Katanic 5 | | Pts: Ozzy-Momodu 14; Rebs: Ozzy-Momodu 9 Asts: Winterburn 3 |

Centro de Desportos e Congressos de Matosinhos, Matosinhos - Grande Porto (POR)
Attendance: 150
Referees: Luis Miguel Castillo Larroca (ESP), Martin Horozov (BUL), Aliaksandr Syrytsa (BLR)

== Classification playoffs for 9th – 16th place ==
13th place match
F6 | Belgium | 50
E6 | Slovakia | 57
15th place match
G4 | England | 44
G3 | Netherlands | 57

13th – 16th place playoffs
E4 | England | 44
F6 | Belgium | 53
G3 | Netherlands | 59
E6 | Slovakia | 66 OT

9th – 16th place playoffs
F5 | Germany | 81
G4 | England | 27
F6 | Belgium | 55
G1 | Croatia | 59
E5 | Turkey | 75
G3 | Netherlands | 60
E6 | Slovakia | 48
G2 | Serbia | 56

9th – 12th place playoffs
F5 | Germany | 65
G1 | Croatia | 45
E5 | Turkey | 61
G2 | Serbia | 63

9th place match
F5 | Germany
G2 | Serbia
11th place match
G1 | Croatia | 63
E5 | Turkey | 68

=== Classification games for 9th – 16th place ===
21 August 2015
14:00

| Germany | 81–27 | England |
Scoring by quarter: 10-4, 21-14, 22-1, 28-8
Scoring by half: 31-18

Pavilhao Municipal de Guiföes, Matosinhos (POR)

21 August 2015
16:15

| Belgium | 26–28 HT | Croatia |
Scoring by quarter: 19-12, 7-16, 17-12, 12-19
Scoring by half: 26-28

Pavilhao Municipal de Guiföes, Matosinhos (POR)

21 August 2015
18:30

| Turkey | 75–60 | Netherlands |
Scoring by quarter: 13-12, 19-12, 21-23, 22-13
Scoring by half: 32-24

Pavilhao Municipal de Guiföes, Matosinhos (POR)

21 August 2015
20:45

| Slovakia | 48–56 | Serbia |
Scoring by quarter: 2-18, 20-14, 11-6, 15-18
Scoring by half: 22-32

Pavilhao Municipal de Guiföes, Matosinhos (POR)

=== Classification games for 13th – 16th place ===
22 August 2015
14:00

| England | 44–53 | Belgium |
Scoring by quarter: 10-9, 10-13, 14-14, 10-17
Scoring by half: 20-22

Pavilhao Municipal de Guiföes, Matosinhos (POR)

22 August 2015
16:15

| Netherlands | 59–66 (OT) | Slovakia |
Scoring by quarter: 18-13, 14-8, 11-16, 12-18, Overtime: 4-11
Scoring by half: 32-21 Overtime: 4-11

Pavilhao Municipal de Guiföes, Matosinhos (POR)

=== Classification games for 9th – 12th place ===
22 August 2015
18:30

| Germany | 65–45 | Croatia |
Scoring by quarter: 17-9, 22-8, 14-18, 12-10
Scoring by half: 39-17

Pavilhao Municipal de Guiföes, Matosinhos (POR)

22 August 2015
20:45

| Turkey | 61–63 | Serbia |
Scoring by quarter: 12-24, 13-15, 16-15, 20-9
Scoring by half: 25-39

Pavilhao Municipal de Guiföes, Matosinhos (POR)

== Championship playoffs ==
Fifth place
F4 | Latvia | 46
F1 | France | 45
Seventh place
F2 | Hungary | 71
E2 | Russia | 64

Consolation semifinals
F4 | Latvia | 71
F2 | Hungary | 68
F1 | France | 61
E2 | Russia | 59

Quarterfinals
E1 | Italy | 71
F4 | Latvia | 59
F2 | Hungary | 56
E3 | Czech Republic | 60
F1 | France | 54
E4 | Portugal | 62
E2 | Russia | 61
F3 | Spain | 70

Semifinals
E1 | Italy | 53
E3 | Czech Republic | 65
E4 | Portugal | 64
F3 | Spain | 44

Final
E3 | Czech Republic | 79
E4 | Portugal | 55
Third place
E1 | Italy | 70
F3 | Spain | 54

=== Quarterfinals ===
21 August 2015
14:00

| Italy | 71–59 | Latvia |
Scoring by quarter: 23-19, 15-14, 18-11, 15-15
Scoring by half: 38-33

Centro de Desportos e Congressos de Matosinhos, Matosinhos (POR)

21 August 2015
16:15

| Hungary | 31–30 HT | Czech Republic |
Scoring by quarter: 22-17, 9-13
Scoring by half: 31-30

Centro de Desportos e Congressos de Matosinhos, Matosinhos (POR)

21 August 2015
18:30

| Russia | 61–70 | Spain |
Scoring by quarter: 22-13, 9-24, 7-17, 23-16
Scoring by half: 31-37

Centro de Desportos e Congressos de Matosinhos, Matosinhos (POR)

21 August 2015
20:45

| France | 54–62 | Portugal |
Scoring by quarter: 9-16, 13-14, 13-18, 19-14
Scoring by half: 22-30

Centro de Desportos e Congressos de Matosinhos, Matosinhos (POR)

=== Classification games for 5th – 8th place ===
22 August 2015
14:00

| Latvia | 71–68 | Hungary |
Scoring by quarter: 21-18, 19-27, 13-9, 18-14
Scoring by half: 40-45

Centro de Desportos e Congressos de Matosinhos, Matosinhos (POR)

22 August 2015
16:15

| France | 61–59 | Russia |
Scoring by quarter: 12-22, 14-19, 18-9, 17-9
Scoring by half: 26-41

Centro de Desportos e Congressos de Matosinhos, Matosinhos (POR)

=== Semifinals ===
22 August 2015
18:30

| Italy | 53–65 | Czech Republic |
Scoring by quarter: 18-15, 13-18, 8-9, 14-23
Scoring by half: 31-33

Centro de Desportos e Congressos de Matosinhos, Matosinhos (POR)

22 August 2015
20:45

| Portugal | 64–44 | Spain |
Scoring by quarter: 12-4, 18-11, 12-15, 22-14
Scoring by half: 30-15

Centro de Desportos e Congressos de Matosinhos, Matosinhos (POR)

== Final classification games ==
=== Match for 15th place ===
23 August 2015
11:45

| England | 44–57 | Netherlands |
Scoring by quarter: 4-10, 14-17, 18-21, 8-9
Scoring by half: 18-27

Pavilhao Municipal de Guiföes, Matosinhos (POR)

=== Match for 13th place ===
23 August 2015
14:00

| Belgium | 50–57 | Slovakia |
Scoring by quarter: 13-10, 15-18, 16-10, 6-19
Scoring by half: 28-28

Pavilhao Municipal de Guiföes, Matosinhos (POR)

=== Match for 11th place ===
23 August 2015
16:15

| Croatia | 63–68 | Turkey |
Scoring by quarter: 7-23, 23-16, 25-10, 8-19
Scoring by half: 30-39

Pavilhao Municipal de Guiföes, Matosinhos (POR)

=== Match for 9th place ===
23 August 2015
18:30

| Germany | vs. | Serbia |

Pavilhao Municipal de Guiföes, Matosinhos (POR)

=== Match for 7th place ===
| Hungary | 71–64 | Russia |
Scoring by quarter: 8-11, 24-17, 17-19, 22-17
Scoring by half: 32-28

=== Match for 5th place ===
| Latvia | 46–45 | France |
Scoring by quarter: 11-8, 18-13, 7-8, 10-16
Scoring by half: 29-21

=== Bronze medal match ===
23 August 2015
17:30

Boxscore

| Italy | 70–54 | Spain |
Scoring by quarter: 13–11, 22–13, 13–15, 22–15
Scoring by half: 35–24
| Pts: Fassina 11; Rebs: Cubaj 11; Asts: Pinzan, Cubaj, Madera 2 | | Pts: Galeron Alvarez 10; Rebs: Prieto Martinez 8 Asts: Gonzalez Vazquez 7 |

Centro de Desportos e Congressos de Matosinhos, Matosinhos
Attendance: 4,500
Referees: Mykola Ambrosov (UKR), Sónia Teixeira (POR), Juris Kokainis (LAT)

=== Final ===
23 August 2015
19:45

Boxscore

| Czech Republic | 79–55 | Portugal |
Scoring by quarter: 19–7, 20–14, 17–14, 23–20
Scoring by half: 39–21
| Pts: Vitulová 18; Rebs: Vitulová 11; Asts: Vorácková 5 | | Pts: Silva 11; Rebs: Jordão 8 Asts: Ramos 6 |

Centro de Desportos e Congressos de Matosinhos, Matosinhos
Attendance: 5,000
Referees: Igor Mitrovski (MKD), Luis Miguel Castillo Larroca (ESP), Vasiliki Tsaroucha (GRE)

== Final standings ==
| Rank | Team | Record |
|---|---|---|
| 1st place, gold medalist(s) | Czech Republic | 7–2 |
| 2nd place, silver medalist(s) | Portugal | 5–4 |
| 3rd place, bronze medalist(s) | Italy | 8–1 |
| 4th | Spain | 5–4 |
| 5th | Latvia | 5–4 |
| 6th | France | 7–2 |
| 7th | Hungary | 6–3 |
| 8th | Russia | 5–4 |
| 9th | Germany | 5–4 |
| 10th | Serbia | 4–5 |
| 11th | Turkey | 4–5 |
| 12th | Croatia | 4–5 |
| 13th | Slovakia | 3–6 |
| 14th | Belgium | 2–7 |
| 15th | Netherlands | 2–7 |
| 16th | England | 0–9 |

2015 FIBA Europe Under-16 Championship for Women
Winners

Czech Republic
1st title

| Qualified for the 2016 FIBA Under-17 World Championship for Women |
| Qualified as the host nation for the 2016 FIBA Under-17 World Championship for Women |
| Relegated to the 2016 FIBA U16 Women's European Championship Division B |
