= Turkey women's national under-16 and under-17 basketball team =

Turkish sports

Turkey
- Joined FIBA: 1936
- FIBA zone: FIBA Europe
- National federation: TBF

U17 World Cup
- Appearances: 2
- Medals: None

U16 EuroBasket
- Appearances: 20
- Medals: None

U16 EuroBasket Division B
- Appearances: 3
- Medals: Silver: 1 (2022); Bronze: 1 (2025)
Home	Away

The Turkey women's national under-16 and under-17 basketball team (Turkish: Türkiye Yıldız Kız Milli Basketbol Takımı) is a national basketball team of Turkey, administered by the Turkish Basketball Federation. It represents the country in international under-16 and under-17 women's basketball competitions.

== FIBA U16 Women's EuroBasket participations ==
Year	Position
1976–1997	Did not qualify
(Romania) 1999	10th
(Bulgaria) 2001	Did not qualify
(Turkey) 2003	11th
(Italy) 2004	8th
(Poland) 2005	4th
(Slovakia) 2006	11th
(Latvia) 2007	14th
(Poland) 2008	8th
(Italy) 2009	5th
(Greece) 2010	6th
(Italy) 2011	4th
(Hungary) 2012	13th
(Bulgaria) 2013	12th
(Hungary) 2014	8th
(Portugal) 2015	11th
(Italy) 2016	9th
(France) 2017	11th
(Lithuania) 2018	4th
(North Macedonia) 2019	15th
(Montenegro) 2022	Division B, 2nd
(Turkey) 2023	15th
(Turkey) 2024	Division B, 4th
(Turkey) 2025	Division B, 3rd
(Romania) 2026	6th
Total	20/36 (Div. A) 3/21 (Div. B)

== FIBA Under-17 Women's Basketball World Cup record ==
Year	Pos.	Pld	W	L
(France) 2010	10th	7	3	4
(Netherlands) 2012	12th	7	0	7
(Czech Republic) 2014	Did not qualify			
(Spain) 2016	Did not qualify			
(Belarus) 2018	Did not qualify			
(Hungary) 2022	Did not qualify			
(Mexico) 2024	Did not qualify			
(Czech Republic) 2026	Did not qualify			
(Indonesia) 2028	To be determined			
Total	2/8	14	3	11

== See also ==
- Men's
  - Turkey Men's national basketball team
  - Turkey Men's national basketball team U20
  - Turkey Men's national basketball team U18 and U19
  - Turkey Men's national basketball team U16 and U17
  - Turkey Men's national 3x3 team
- Women's
  - Turkey Women's national basketball team
  - Turkey Women's national basketball team U20
  - Turkey Women's national basketball team U18 and U19
  - Turkey Women's national basketball team U16 and U17
  - Turkey Women's national 3x3 team
