= 2023 FIBA U16 Women's European Championship =

Basketball tournament in Turkey

Tournament details
- Host country: Turkey
- City: İzmir
- Dates: 11–19 August 2023
- Teams: 16 (from 1 confederation)
- Venues: 2 (in 1 host city)

Final positions
- Champions: France (5th title)
- Runners-up: Spain
- Third place: Italy
- Fourth place: Finland

Tournament statistics
- MVP: (France) Aïnhoa Risacher

Official website
- www.fiba.basketball/history

The 2023 FIBA U16 Women's European Championship was the 33rd edition of the European basketball championship for women's national under-16 teams. The tournament was played from 11 to 19 August 2023 in İzmir, Turkey. The top five teams qualified for the 2024 FIBA Under-17 Women's Basketball World Cup in Mexico.

== Participating teams ==
- Belgium
- Croatia
- Czech Republic
- Finland
- France
- Greece
- Hungary
- Israel ▲ (Third place, 2022 FIBA U16 Women's European Championship Division B)
- Italy
- Latvia
- Poland
- Portugal
- Serbia ▲ (Winners, 2022 FIBA U16 Women's European Championship Division B)
- Slovenia
- Spain
- Turkey ▲ (Runners-up, 2022 FIBA U16 Women's European Championship Division B)

== First round ==
The draw of the first round was held on 14 February 2023 in Freising, Germany.

In the first round, the teams were drawn into four groups of four. All teams advanced to the playoffs.

All times are local (Turkey Time – UTC+3).

=== Group A ===
Pos	Team	Pld	W	L	PF	PA	PD	Pts
1	Finland	3	3	0	132	102	+30	6
2	Latvia	3	2	1	188	178	+10	5
3	Czech Republic	3	1	2	184	179	+5	4
4	Portugal	3	0	3	90	135	−45	3

Source: FIBA

11 August 2023
14:00

Boxscore

Czech Republic	67–45	Portugal
Scoring by quarter: 10–7, 22–5, 10–18, 25–15

Bornova Belediyesi Atatürk Spor Kompleksi, İzmir

11 August 2023
16:30

Boxscore

Latvia	48–70	Finland
Scoring by quarter: 11–14, 10–21, 13–16, 14–19

Bornova Belediyesi Atatürk Spor Kompleksi, İzmir

12 August 2023
14:00

Boxscore

Finland	62–54	Czech Republic
Scoring by quarter: 14–9, 15–18, 20–13, 13–14

Mustafa Kemal Atatürk Karşıyaka Spor Salonu, İzmir

12 August 2023
21:30

Boxscore

Portugal	45–68	Latvia
Scoring by quarter: 9–18, 8–21, 9–15, 19–14

Bornova Belediyesi Atatürk Spor Kompleksi, İzmir

13 August 2023
16:30

Boxscore

Finland	80–56	Portugal
Scoring by quarter: 23–12, 26–12, 17–10, 14–22

Mustafa Kemal Atatürk Karşıyaka Spor Salonu, İzmir

13 August 2023
21:30

Boxscore

Czech Republic	63–72	Latvia
Scoring by quarter: 18–12, 13–20, 17–19, 15–21

Mustafa Kemal Atatürk Karşıyaka Spor Salonu, İzmir

=== Group B ===
Pos	Team	Pld	W	L	PF	PA	PD	Pts
1	France	3	3	0	124	106	+18	6
2	Hungary	3	2	1	138	123	+15	5
3	Serbia	3	1	2	192	200	−8	4
4	Turkey (H)	3	0	3	186	211	−25	3

Source: FIBA
(H) Hosts

11 August 2023
19:00

Boxscore

Hungary	70–59	Turkey
Scoring by quarter: 14–14, 23–12, 22–18, 11–15

Mustafa Kemal Atatürk Karşıyaka Spor Salonu, İzmir

11 August 2023
21:30

Boxscore

France	62–49	Serbia
Scoring by quarter: 21–17, 12–12, 13–14, 16–6

Mustafa Kemal Atatürk Karşıyaka Spor Salonu, İzmir

12 August 2023
19:00

Boxscore

Turkey	57–62	France
Scoring by quarter: 10–24, 17–15, 16–14, 14–9

Mustafa Kemal Atatürk Karşıyaka Spor Salonu, İzmir

12 August 2023
19:00

Boxscore

Serbia	64–68	Hungary
Scoring by quarter: 19–17, 14–10, 18–15, 5–9

Bornova Belediyesi Atatürk Spor Kompleksi, İzmir

13 August 2023
14:00

Boxscore

France	70–50	Hungary
Scoring by quarter: 16–16, 14–8, 19–15, 21–11

Bornova Belediyesi Atatürk Spor Kompleksi, İzmir

13 August 2023
19:00

Boxscore

Turkey	70–79	Serbia
Scoring by quarter: 15–26, 16–21, 25–17, 14–15

Mustafa Kemal Atatürk Karşıyaka Spor Salonu, İzmir

=== Group C ===
Pos	Team	Pld	W	L	PF	PA	PD	Pts
1	Italy	3	2	1	193	164	+29	5
2	Croatia	3	2	1	204	193	+11	5
3	Poland	3	2	1	182	174	+8	5
4	Israel	3	0	3	179	227	−48	3

Source: FIBA

11 August 2023
14:00

Boxscore

Italy	82–55	Israel
Scoring by quarter: 18–13, 21–9, 19–16, 24–17

Mustafa Kemal Atatürk Karşıyaka Spor Salonu, İzmir

11 August 2023
16:30

Boxscore

Poland	67–65	Croatia
Scoring by quarter: 19–11, 8–14, 25–22, 15–18

Mustafa Kemal Atatürk Karşıyaka Spor Salonu, İzmir

12 August 2023
14:00

Boxscore

Croatia	58–56	Italy
Scoring by quarter: 12–12, 16–7, 13–20, 17–17

Bornova Belediyesi Atatürk Spor Kompleksi, İzmir

12 August 2023
16:30

Boxscore

Israel	54–64	Poland
Scoring by quarter: 16–12, 16–18, 12–10, 10–24

Bornova Belediyesi Atatürk Spor Kompleksi, İzmir

13 August 2023
14:00

Boxscore

Croatia	81–70	Israel
Scoring by quarter: 19–13, 21–23, 23–16, 18–18

Mustafa Kemal Atatürk Karşıyaka Spor Salonu, İzmir

13 August 2023
21:30

Boxscore

Italy	55–51	Poland
Scoring by quarter: 8–12, 14–16, 17–15, 16–8

Bornova Belediyesi Atatürk Spor Kompleksi, İzmir

=== Group D ===
Pos	Team	Pld	W	L	PF	PA	PD	Pts
1	Spain	3	3	0	203	122	+81	6
2	Slovenia	3	2	1	189	174	+15	5
3	Belgium	3	1	2	174	178	−4	4
4	Greece	3	0	3	112	204	−92	3

Source: FIBA

11 August 2023
19:00

Boxscore

Spain	54–46	Slovenia
Scoring by quarter: 16–11, 14–14, 11–12, 13–9

Bornova Belediyesi Atatürk Spor Kompleksi, İzmir

11 August 2023
21:30

Boxscore

Belgium	58–32	Greece
Scoring by quarter: 13–11, 9–10, 19–7, 17–4

Bornova Belediyesi Atatürk Spor Kompleksi, İzmir

12 August 2023
16:30

Boxscore

Greece	31–82	Spain
Scoring by quarter: 8–17, 8–18, 2–17, 13–30

Mustafa Kemal Atatürk Karşıyaka Spor Salonu, İzmir

12 August 2023
21:30

Boxscore

Slovenia	79–71	Belgium
Scoring by quarter: 17–19, 14–21, 25–16, 23–15

Mustafa Kemal Atatürk Karşıyaka Spor Salonu, İzmir

13 August 2023
16:30

Boxscore

Spain	67–45	Belgium
Scoring by quarter: 18–5, 19–14, 11–15, 19–11

Bornova Belediyesi Atatürk Spor Kompleksi, İzmir

13 August 2023
19:00

Boxscore

Greece	49–64	Slovenia
Scoring by quarter: 15–25, 20–16, 6–11, 8–12

Bornova Belediyesi Atatürk Spor Kompleksi, İzmir

== Playoff brackets ==
=== Main bracket ===
Round of 16
15 August
A1 Finland	83
B4 Turkey	60
15 August
C2 Croatia	90
D3 Belgium	72
15 August
B2 Hungary	67
A3 Czech Republic	58
15 August
D1 Spain	95
C4 Israel	47
15 August
A2 Latvia	57
B3 Serbia	73
15 August
C1 Italy	56
D4 Greece	35
15 August
B1 France	76
A4 Portugal	26
15 August
D2 Slovenia	42
C3 Poland	66

Quarterfinals
16 August
Finland	79
Croatia	78
16 August
Hungary	64
Spain	72
16 August
Serbia	46
Italy	53
16 August
France	64
Poland	45

Semifinals
18 August
Finland	49
Spain	85
18 August
Italy	66
France	69

Final
19 August
Spain	63
France	67
3rd place match
19 August
Finland	58
Italy	59

=== 5th place bracket ===
5th–8th place semifinals
18 August
Croatia	86
Hungary	76
18 August
Serbia	51
Poland	64

5th place match
19 August
Croatia	74
Poland	57
7th place match
19 August
Hungary	51
Serbia	53

=== 9th place bracket ===
9th–16th place quarterfinals
16 August
Turkey	45
Belgium	83
16 August
Czech Republic	56
Israel	58
16 August
Latvia	62
Greece	51
16 August
Portugal	62
Slovenia	67

9th–12th place semifinals
18 August
Belgium	72
Israel	66
18 August
Latvia	49
Slovenia	70

9th place match
19 August
Belgium	66
Slovenia	45
11th place match
19 August
Israel	56
Latvia	59

=== 13th place bracket ===
13th–16th place semifinals
18 August
Turkey	48
Czech Republic	66
18 August
Greece	61
Portugal	46

13th place match
19 August
Czech Republic	51
Greece	55
15th place match
19 August
Turkey	69
Portugal	61

== Playoff results ==
=== Round of 16 ===
15 August 2023
13:00

Boxscore

France	76–26	Portugal
Scoring by quarter: 16–13, 22–4, 15–6, 23–3

Bornova Belediyesi Atatürk Spor Kompleksi, İzmir

15 August 2023
13:00

Boxscore

Spain	95–47	Israel
Scoring by quarter: 25–11, 28–17, 21–1, 21–18

Mustafa Kemal Atatürk Karşıyaka Spor Salonu, İzmir

15 August 2023
15:30

Boxscore

Hungary	67–58	Czech Republic
Scoring by quarter: 14–12, 21–15, 14–16, 18–15

Mustafa Kemal Atatürk Karşıyaka Spor Salonu, İzmir

15 August 2023
15:30

Boxscore

Slovenia	42–66	Poland
Scoring by quarter: 9–25, 8–15, 11–15, 14–11

Bornova Belediyesi Atatürk Spor Kompleksi, İzmir

15 August 2023
18:00

Boxscore

Finland	83–60	Turkey
Scoring by quarter: 19–16, 20–17, 24–17, 20–10

Mustafa Kemal Atatürk Karşıyaka Spor Salonu, İzmir

15 August 2023
18:00

Boxscore

Latvia	57–73	Serbia
Scoring by quarter: 13–13, 13–24, 15–18, 16–18

Bornova Belediyesi Atatürk Spor Kompleksi, İzmir

15 August 2023
20:30

Boxscore

Italy	56–35	Greece
Scoring by quarter: 20–11, 18–12, 10–7, 8–5

Bornova Belediyesi Atatürk Spor Kompleksi, İzmir

15 August 2023
20:30

Boxscore

Croatia	90–72	Belgium
Scoring by quarter: 20–18, 19–14, 28–20, 23–20

Mustafa Kemal Atatürk Karşıyaka Spor Salonu, İzmir

=== 9th–16th place quarterfinals ===
16 August 2023
14:00

Boxscore

Czech Republic	56–58	Israel
Scoring by quarter: 15–19, 18–7, 12–19, 11–13

Bornova Belediyesi Atatürk Spor Kompleksi, İzmir

16 August 2023
16:30

Boxscore

Portugal	62–67	Slovenia
Scoring by quarter: 19–12, 9–22, 13–15, 21–18

Bornova Belediyesi Atatürk Spor Kompleksi, İzmir

16 August 2023
19:00

Boxscore

Turkey	45–83	Belgium
Scoring by quarter: 6–29, 20–18, 13–24, 6–12

Bornova Belediyesi Atatürk Spor Kompleksi, İzmir

16 August 2023
21:30

Boxscore

Latvia	62–51	Greece
Scoring by quarter: 9–14, 13–9, 20–17, 20–11

Bornova Belediyesi Atatürk Spor Kompleksi, İzmir

=== 13th–16th place semifinals ===
18 August 2023
14:00

Boxscore

Turkey	48–66	Czech Republic
Scoring by quarter: 12–21, 16–14, 8–18, 12–13

Bornova Belediyesi Atatürk Spor Kompleksi, İzmir

18 August 2023
16:30

Boxscore

Greece	61–46	Portugal
Scoring by quarter: 12–4, 14–18, 17–18, 18–16

Bornova Belediyesi Atatürk Spor Kompleksi, İzmir

=== 15th place match ===
19 August 2023
12:00

Boxscore

Turkey	69–61	Portugal
Scoring by quarter: 20–20, 19–8, 14–15, 16–18

Bornova Belediyesi Atatürk Spor Kompleksi, İzmir

=== 13th place match ===
19 August 2023
16:30

Boxscore

Czech Republic	51–55	Greece
Scoring by quarter: 19–18, 13–18, 8–11, 11–8

Mustafa Kemal Atatürk Karşıyaka Spor Salonu, İzmir

=== 9th–12th place semifinals ===
18 August 2023
19:00

Boxscore

Belgium	72–66	Israel
Scoring by quarter: 27–21, 20–19, 12–11, 13–15

Bornova Belediyesi Atatürk Spor Kompleksi, İzmir

18 August 2023
21:30

Boxscore

Latvia	49–70	Slovenia
Scoring by quarter: 11–17, 10–22, 14–16, 14–15

Bornova Belediyesi Atatürk Spor Kompleksi, İzmir

=== 11th place match ===
19 August 2023
14:30

Boxscore

Israel	56–59	Latvia
Scoring by quarter: 13–22, 17–13, 19–13, 7–11

Bornova Belediyesi Atatürk Spor Kompleksi, İzmir

=== 9th place match ===
19 August 2023
17:00

Boxscore

Belgium	66–45	Slovenia
Scoring by quarter: 19–9, 16–8, 14–16, 17–12

Bornova Belediyesi Atatürk Spor Kompleksi, İzmir

=== Championship quarterfinals ===
16 August 2023
14:00

Boxscore

Hungary	64–72	Spain
Scoring by quarter: 17–19, 16–17, 15–24, 16–12

Mustafa Kemal Atatürk Karşıyaka Spor Salonu, İzmir

16 August 2023
16:30

Boxscore

France	64–45	Poland
Scoring by quarter: 16–16, 27–13, 9–8, 12–8

Mustafa Kemal Atatürk Karşıyaka Spor Salonu, İzmir

16 August 2023
19:00

Boxscore

Finland	79–78	Croatia
Scoring by quarter: 22–21, 21–14, 20–29, 16–14

Mustafa Kemal Atatürk Karşıyaka Spor Salonu, İzmir

16 August 2023
21:30

Boxscore

Serbia	46–53	Italy
Scoring by quarter: 11–10, 12–17, 11–16, 12–10

Mustafa Kemal Atatürk Karşıyaka Spor Salonu, İzmir

=== 5th–8th place semifinals ===
18 August 2023
14:00

Boxscore

Croatia	86–76	Hungary
Scoring by quarter: 25–17, 16–15, 22–14, 23–30

Mustafa Kemal Atatürk Karşıyaka Spor Salonu, İzmir

18 August 2023
16:30

Boxscore

Serbia	51–64	Poland
Scoring by quarter: 11–18, 12–18, 13–18, 15–10

Mustafa Kemal Atatürk Karşıyaka Spor Salonu, İzmir

=== 7th place match ===
19 August 2023
19:30

Boxscore

Hungary	51–53	Serbia
Scoring by quarter: 12–10, 15–13, 20–18, 4–12

Bornova Belediyesi Atatürk Spor Kompleksi, İzmir

=== 5th place match ===
19 August 2023
14:00

Boxscore

Croatia	74–57	Poland
Scoring by quarter: 17–22, 22–12, 14–9, 21–14

Mustafa Kemal Atatürk Karşıyaka Spor Salonu, İzmir

=== Championship semifinals ===
18 August 2023
19:00

Boxscore

Finland	49–85	Spain
Scoring by quarter: 21–20, 12–13, 9–26, 7–26

Mustafa Kemal Atatürk Karşıyaka Spor Salonu, İzmir

18 August 2023
21:30

Boxscore

Italy	66–69 (OT)	France
Scoring by quarter: 12–18, 17–12, 14–14, 15–14, Overtime: 8–11

Mustafa Kemal Atatürk Karşıyaka Spor Salonu, İzmir

=== 3rd place match ===
19 August 2023
19:00

Boxscore

Finland	58–59	Italy
Scoring by quarter: 8–15, 15–16, 20–12, 15–16

Mustafa Kemal Atatürk Karşıyaka Spor Salonu, İzmir

=== Final ===
19 August 2023
21:30

Boxscore

Spain	63–67	France
Scoring by quarter: 21–10, 12–21, 14–19, 16–17

Mustafa Kemal Atatürk Karşıyaka Spor Salonu, İzmir

== Final standings ==
Rank	Team	Record
1st place, gold medalist(s)	France	7–0
2nd place, silver medalist(s)	Spain	6–1
3rd place, bronze medalist(s)	Italy	5–2
4	Finland	5–2
5	Croatia	5–2
6	Poland	4–3
7	Serbia	3–4
8	Hungary	3–4
9	Belgium	4–3
10	Slovenia	4–3
11	Latvia	4–3
12	Israel	1–6
13	Greece	2–5
14	Czech Republic	2–5
15	Turkey	1–6
16	Portugal	0–7

Qualified for the 2024 FIBA Under-17 Women's Basketball World Cup
Relegated to the 2024 FIBA U16 Women's EuroBasket Division B

== See also ==
- 2023 FIBA U16 Women's European Championship Division B
