= Ana Cláudia Ramos =

Brazilian volleyball player (born 1961)

Personal information
- Full name: Ana Cláudia da Silva Ramos
- Nationality: Brazilian
- Born: 31 October 1961 (age 64)
- Height: 179 cm (70 in)
- Weight: 66 kg (146 lb)

National team
| 1986-1989 | Brazil |

Ana Cláudia da Silva Ramos (born 31 October 1961) is a retired Brazilian female volleyball player.

She was part of the Brazil women's national volleyball team at the 1988 Summer Olympics. She also competed at the 1986 FIVB Volleyball Women's World Championship.
