= Freiherr von Philippsberg =

Freiherr von Philippsberg (German: Baron of Philippsberg) and Freiherr von Philippovich (Serbo-Croatian: Barun Filipović, lit. 'Baron Philippovich'), is an Austro-Hungarian noble title.

== People people holding this title ==
- Alexander Freiherr von Philippovich (1895–), Austrohungarian chemist
- Eugen von Philippovich, Baron Philippsberg (1858–1917), Bosnian Austrohungarian economist
- Franz Philippovich, Freiherr von Philippsberg (1820–1903), Croatian Austrohungarian general
- Josip Filipović, Baron von Philippsberg (1819–1889), Croatian Austrohungarian general
- Max Freiherr von Philippovich (1855–1895), Serbian Austrohungarian officer
