= Pilip =

Pilip is a masculine given name, cognate to Philip.

It may refer to:

- Pilip Ballach Ó Duibhgeannáin (fl. 1579–1590), Irish hereditary historian
- Pilip Vaitsiakhovich (born 1990), Belarusian football player

Pilip is also a surname of:

- Ivan Pilip (born 1963), Czech politician and economist
- Mazi Melesa Pilip, Ethiopian-born American politician

== See also ==
- Filip
- Pylyp
