= Büşra Akbaş =

Turkish basketball player

No. 6 – ÇBK Mersin
- Position: Point guard

Personal information
- Born: 8 March 1995 (age 31) Tarsus, Mersin, Turkey
- Listed height: 5 ft 9 in (1.75 m)

Career information
- Playing career: 2011–present

Career history
- 2011–2021: Botaş
- 2016: → Foça Basketbol
- 2016–2017: → İzmit Belediyespor
- 2021–2023: Hatay Büyükşehir Belediyespor
- 2023–2024: Galatasaray
- 2024–2025: Botaş
- 2025–present: ÇBK Mersin

Career highlights
- EuroCup champion (2026)

Büşra Akbaş (born 8 March 1995) is a Turkish female basketball player. The 1.74 m (5 ft 8 1/2 in) national plays Point guard.

== Club career ==
On 28 February 2023, she signed with Galatasaray of the Turkish Women's Basketball Super League (TKBL).

On 22 July 2023, she signed a new one-year contract with Galatasaray.

Galatasaray bid farewell to Büşra on May 15, 2024 by releasing a thank you message for her "efforts and dedication" in the yellow and red jersey as her contract came to an end at the end of the season.
