= Sergey Pilipovich =

Belarusian agronomist (born 1976)

Chairman of Motal Selsoviet
- Incumbent
- Assumed office April 2014
- Preceded by: Aleksandr Shikolay

Personal details
- Born: 6 January 1976 (age 50) Motal, Belarus
- Spouse: Maria
- Children: Vladislav; Roman
- Education: Belarusian State Agricultural Academy

Sergey Nikolayevich Pilipovich (Russian: Сергей Николаевич Пилипович; Belarusian: Сяргей Мікалаевіч Піліповіч, Siarhiej Mikalajevič Pilipovič born January 6, 1976, in Motol) is a Belarusian agronomist. Chairman of the Motal Selsoviet. Graduated Agronomy Department at the Belarusian State Agricultural Academy in Gorki.
