= Zofia Filipowiczowa =

Polish woman accused of sorcery

Zofia Filipowiczowa (died after 1639) was a 17th-century Polish woman accused of witchcraft.

She was prosecuted for witchcraft in Gajona alongside three other women, accused by the nobleman Paweł Podlodowski of having caused the death of his father, Jan Podlodowski, and conspired to cause himself harm as well. She and her accused accomplices (Agnieszka Firlejówka and Anna Wiotezczyna (both from Kozice (now Korzyce); Ewa (surname unknown; from Ziemaki (now Ziomaki); and Łucja (surname unknown; from Wola Kozicka) were convicted and sentenced to whipping and exile. The case has often been depicted in literature and theater, and played a significant role in the local folklore.

Filipowiczowa's story served as a basis for Józef Zięba, a poet associated with Lublin, to write the short story O lubości wielkiej Zofiej Filipowiczowej czaryjącego i zaczaryzanej (On the lust of great Zofia Filipowicz, who made and committed witchcraft) which was first published in his collection Szklaneczka król Stasia (King Stasia's Glass; Lublin 1977; 2nd ed. 1983). Under a different title (Judgement over the "witch"); it was also included in the jubilee collection Tajemnice lubelski koziołka. Twenty-one stories (The Mysteries of the Lublin Billy Goat: Twenty-one Stories) published by him on the occasion of the 700th anniversary of Lublin's incorporation under Magdeburg Law.

The original 17th-century transcripts from Filipowiczowa's trial likely have not survived. A copy of the trial, dating from 1640 and entered into one of Lublin's city books, is kept in the State Archives in Lublin (Akta miasta Lublina, file no. 38, pp. 113–116). It was published in 1947 by Mirosława Dąbrowska-Zakrzewska. Magdalena Kowalska-Cichy wrote about this case in 2019 in her book Magia i prądy o czary w staropolskim Lublinie and Małgorzata Pilaszek wrote about it in Procesy o czary w Polsce w wiekach XV–XVIII (Kraków: 2008).

== Sources ==
- Magdalena Dąbrowska-Zakrzewska: Proces Zofii Filipowiczowej i innych oskarżonych o czary, Lublin, Biblioteka Cyfrowa UMCS, 1947. [Accessed 25 January 2021].
- Józef Zięba: O wielkiej lubości Zofijej Filipowiczowej czary czyniącej i za czary skazanej, Wspaniały dar króla i inne lubelskie opowieści (1996). [Accessed 26 January 2021]. (in Polish)
