= Filip Bergmark =

Swedish ice hockey player

- Born: April 29, 1995 (age 30) Sweden
- Height: 6 ft 1 in (185 cm)
- Weight: 183 lb (83 kg; 13 st 1 lb)
- Position: Defence
- Shoots: Left
- SHL team: Örebro HK
- NHL draft: Undrafted
- Playing career: 2014–present

Filip Bergmark (born April 29, 1995) is a Swedish ice hockey defenceman. He is currently playing with Örebro HK of the Swedish Hockey League (SHL).

Bergmark made his Swedish Hockey League debut playing with Örebro HK during the 2014–15 SHL season.
