= Žofia Hruščáková =

Slovak basketball player

No. 13 – Slávia Banská Bystrica
- Position: Power Forward
- League: Slovak Women's Basketball Extraliga

Personal information
- Born: 12 January 1995 (age 30) Košice, Slovakia
- Listed height: 6 ft 2.8 in (1.90 m)

Career information
- WNBA draft: 2015: 2nd round, 24th overall pick
- Drafted by: Phoenix Mercury
- Playing career: 2011–present
- Stats at Basketball Reference

Žofia Hruščáková (born 12 January 1995) is a Slovak professional basketball player. She plays for Slovak Women's Basketball Extraliga team Slávia Banská Bystrica and Slovak national team. She was named Female Slovak Basketball Player of the Year in 2022. She was named Slovak Female Basketball Player of the Year in 2016 and 2017.

== Biography ==
Žofia Hruščáková was born on 12 January 1995 in Košice, where also started playing high school basketball. In 2013 she graduated from Technical University of Košice.

=== Team career ===
Hruščáková debuted with Danax Sport Košice in the 2011/12 season. Following the dissolution of the club, she played with Good Angels Košice until 2016.

In the 2015 WNBA draft she was drafted by Phoenix Mercury in the second round as the 24th pick.

In 2016 she joined the Hungarian team UNI Győr. In 2017 she played for Italian teams Dike Basket Napoli and PF Schio. In 2018 she played for the French team Flammes Carolo Basket Charleville. In 2019 she returned to UNI Győr, where she was awarded the most valuable player award. Since 2020 she has been playing for Galatasaray S.K. In 2021 she joined CDB Clarions Tenerife. In 2012 she returned to Flammes Carolo Basket Charleville. Since March 2023 she has been playing with Slávia Banská Bystrica.

=== National team ===
Since 2015, she has been part of the Team Slovakia.
