= Filip =

Filip (Cyrillic: Филип) is a masculine given name and a surname, cognate to Philip.

The male name Filip comes from the Greek "philos" (love) and "hippos" (horse), which means "horse lover".

In Croatia, the name Filip was among the most common masculine given names in the 2000s.

Notable people with the name include:

== Given name ==
- Filip Barović (born 1990), Montenegrin basketball player
- Filip Bergmark (born 1995), Swedish ice hockey player
- Filip Bundgaard (born 2004), Danish footballer
- Filip David (1940–2025), Serbian writer and screenwriter
- Filip Đorđević (born 1987), Serbian footballer
- Filip Ekberg (born 2007), Swedish ice hockey player
- Filip Filipović (politician) (1878–1938), Serbian communist politician
- Filip Filipović (American football) (born 1977), American football player of Serbian descent
- Filip Filipović (water polo) (born 1987), Serbian water polo player
- Filip Gravenfors (born 2004), Swedish freestyle skier
- Filip Hološko (born 1984), Slovak footballer
- Filip Cristian Jianu (born 2001), Romanian tennis player
- Filip Jörgensen (born 2002), Danish footballer
- Filip Marković (born 1992), Serbian footballer
- Filip Minařík (1975–2023), Czech jockey
- Filip Mișea (1873–1944), Aromanian activist, physician and politician
- Filip Noga, Albanian politician
- Filip Petrušev (born 2000), Serbian basketball player
- Filip Pravdica (born 1995), Croatian long jumper
- Filip Reinhag (born 1984), Swedish politician
- Filip Schnack (born 2001), German actor
- Filip Stanković (born 2002), Serbian footballer
- Filip Ugran (born 2002), Romanian race car driver
- Filip Verlinden (born 1982), Belgian kickboxer
- Filip Višnjić (1757–1834), Bosnian Serb poet and guslar
- Filip Živković (born 2006), Croatian footballer
- Filip Zubčić (born 1993), Croatian alpine skier

== Surname ==
- Lucian Filip (born 1990), Romanian footballer
- Miroslav Filip (1928–2009), Czech chess grandmaster
- Ota Filip (1930–2018), Czech and German novelist, essayist, journalist
- Pavel Filip (born 1966), Moldovan politician
- Petru Filip (born 1955), Romanian politician
- Simion Filip (fl. 21st c.), Romanian and Moldovan mathematician

== See also ==
- Filip (film)
