= 2010 FIBA Europe Under-16 Championship for Women =

2010 FIBA U16 Women's European Championship
22nd FIBA Under-16 Women's European Basketball Championship

Tournament details
- Host country: Greece
- Dates: 12–22 August 2010
- Teams: 16 (from 1 confederation)
- Venues: 2 (in 2 host cities)

Final positions
- Champions: Russia (4th title)

Tournament statistics
- MVP: (France) Olivia Epoupa
- Top scorer: (Netherlands) Treffers (18.6)
- Top rebounds: (Spain) Balart (11.5)
- Top assists: (Poland) Owczarzak (4.3)
- PPG (Team): Russia (76.0)
- RPG (Team): Russia (52.0)
- APG (Team): Russia (13.6)

Official website
- www.fibaeurope.com

The 2010 FIBA Europe Under-16 Championship for Women was the 22nd edition of the FIBA Europe Under-16 Championship for Women. 16 teams featured the competition, held in Greece from August 12–22. Spain was the defending champion.

== Teams ==
- Belarus
- Belgium
- Croatia ▲ Runners-up, 2009 FIBA Europe Under-16 Championship for Women Division B
- Czech Republic
- Finland
- France
- Greece
- Italy
- Lithuania
- Netherlands ▲ Winners, 2009 FIBA Europe Under-16 Championship for Women Division B
- Poland
- Russia
- Serbia
- Spain
- Sweden
- Turkey

== Group stages ==
=== Preliminary round ===
In this round, the sixteen teams were allocated in four groups of four teams each. The top three qualified for the qualifying round. The last team of each group played for the 13th–16th place in the Classification Games.

Team advanced to Qualifying round
Team competed in Classification round

Times given below are in EEST (UTC+3).

==== Group A ====
Team	Pld	W	L	PF	PA	PD	Pts	Tiebreaker
Russia	3	3	0	265	146	+119	6	
Sweden	3	2	1	182	200	−18	5	
Finland	3	1	2	151	195	−44	4	
Lithuania	3	0	3	142	199	−57	3	

August 12
14:15

Report

Finland	53–80	Russia
Scoring by quarter: 20–17, 7–18, 13–18, 13–27
Pts: Emmi Leino (13); Rebs: Elisa Runsas (7); Asts: Emmi Leino, Kaisa Kuisma (2)		Pts: Alexandra Marchenkova (15); Rebs: Alexandra Marchenkova (14); Asts: Polina Sych (6)

Ioannis Skarkalas Hall, Kozani
Attendance: 150
Referees: Janusz Calik, Francis Santos, Maka Kupatadze

August 12
16:30

Report

Sweden	61–55	Lithuania
Scoring by quarter: 18–15, 15–12, 11–11, 17–17
Pts: Paulina Hersler (33); Rebs: Paulina Hersler (14); Asts: Iris Strömberg (4)		Pts: Egle Zelnyte (13); Rebs: Justina Matuzonyte (15); Asts: six players (1)

Ioannis Skarkalas Hall, Kozani
Attendance: 100
Referees: Tomislav Kovacic, Carlos Mateus, Vincent Delestrée

August 13
14:15

Report

Lithuania	48–50	Finland
Scoring by quarter: 15–18, 11–12, 7–12, 15–8
Pts: Gerda Kruckauskaite (11); Rebs: Egle Zelnyte (9); Asts: Egle Zelnyte (3)		Pts: Anni Kärkkäinen (12); Rebs: Elisa Runsas (9); Asts: four players (1)

DAK Ptolemaida I, Ptolemaida
Attendance: 50
Referees: Enrico Sabetta, Zafer Yilmaz, Jelena Tomic

August 13
18:45

Report

Russia	97–54	Sweden
Scoring by quarter: 22–16, 35–17, 22–12, 18–9
Pts: Polina Sych, Albina Razheva (16); Rebs: Albina Razheva (9); Asts: three players (3)		Pts: Raushan Gültekin, Evelyn Troha (10); Rebs: Signe Lennartsdotter (5); Asts: Iris Strömberg (2)

DAK Ptolemaida I, Ptolemaida
Referees: Henrykh Bekish, Ilona Kucerova, Francis Santos

August 14
14:15

Report

Russia	88–39	Lithuania
Scoring by quarter: 23–16, 14–11, 26–4, 25–8
Pts: Julia Gladkova (12); Rebs: Anna Shchetina (16); Asts: Yulia Sorokina (4)		Pts: Egle Zelnyte (8); Rebs: Egle Zelnyte (6); Asts: 3 tied with (1)

Ioannis Skarkalas Hall, Kozani
Attendance: 80
Referees: Georgios Tanatzis, Henri Hilke, Vincent Delestrée

August 14
21:00

Report

Sweden	67–48	Finland
Scoring by quarter: 15–15, 18–11, 19–12, 15–10
Pts: Linnea Frykbo, Agnes Mellström (14); Rebs: Agnes Mellström (10); Asts: Johanna Andersson (4)		Pts: Vilma Purhonen (12); Rebs: Elisa Runsas (9); Asts: 3 tied with (2)

Ioannis Skarkalas Hall, Kozani
Attendance: 200
Referees: Miodrag Licina, Janusz Calik, Maka Kupatadze

==== Group B ====
Team	Pld	W	L	PF	PA	PD	Pts	Tiebreaker
France	3	3	0	186	170	+16	6	
Croatia	3	2	1	240	197	+43	5	
Serbia	3	1	2	171	195	−24	4	
Italy	3	0	3	156	191	−35	3	

August 12
18:45

Report

Croatia	74–79	France
Scoring by quarter: 20–23, 21–13, 17–28, 16–15
Pts: Lana Pačkovski (14); Rebs: Ivana Tikvić (9); Asts: Lana Pačkovski (4)		Pts: Olivia Epoupa (24); Rebs: Marième Badiane (14); Asts: Valeriane Ayayi, Olivia Epoupa (2)

Ioannis Skarkalas Hall, Kozani
Attendance: 300
Referees: Virginijus Dovidavicius, Zdravko Rutesic, Alin Faur

August 12
21:00

Report

Italy	55–58	Serbia
Scoring by quarter: 15–14, 7–19, 19–8, 14–17
Pts: Giulia Gombac (15); Rebs: Francesca Minali (15); Asts: Francesca Minali, Erica Reggiani (2)		Pts: Nataša Kovačević (16); Rebs: Kristina Topuzović (10); Asts: Nataša Kovačević (3)

Ioannis Skarkalas Hall, Kozani
Attendance: 500
Referees: Vladimir Tsekov, Zoran Zlatevski, Apostolos Kalpakas

August 13
16:30

Report

Serbia	67–90	Croatia
Scoring by quarter: 16–22, 17–24, 18–22, 16–22
Pts: Nataša Kovačević (22); Rebs: Nataša Kovačević (7); Asts: Kristina Topuzović (3)		Pts: Ružica Džankić (26); Rebs: Ivana Tikvić (9); Asts: Lana Pačkovski (7)

DAK Ptolemaida I, Ptolemaida
Attendance: 45
Referees: Janusz Calik, Aleksandar Milojevik, Gennadi Ponomarev

August 13
21:00

Report

France	57–50	Italy
Scoring by quarter: 25–17, 7–14, 12–9, 13–10
Pts: Valeriane Ayayi (18); Rebs: Olivia Epoupa (12); Asts: Olivia Epoupa, Lidija Turčinović (3)		Pts: Erica Reggiani (15); Rebs: Francesca Minali (6); Asts: three players (1)

DAK Ptolemaida I, Ptolemaida
Attendance: 80
Referees: Georgios Tanatzis, Zdravko Rutesic, Tomislav Kovacic

August 14
16:30

Report

France	50–46	Serbia
Scoring by quarter: 7–19, 13–16, 19–9, 11–2
Pts: Olivia Epoupa (25); Rebs: Marieme Badiane (9); Asts: 4 tied with (2)		Pts: Nataša Kovačević (13); Rebs: Kristina Topuzović (7); Asts: Jovana Vidaković (4)

Ioannis Skarkalas Hall, Kozani
Attendance: 500
Referees: Virginijus Dovidavicius, Oscar Perea, Ilona Kucerova

August 14
18:45

Report

Italy	51–76	Croatia
Scoring by quarter: 16–16, 21–8, 5–17, 9–25
Pts: Erica Reggiani (14); Rebs: Francesca Minali (8); Asts: Marida Orazzo, Antonia Peresson (2)		Pts: Ružica Džankić (17); Rebs: Andrijana Cvitković (15); Asts: Lana Pačkovski (7)

Ioannis Skarkalas Hall, Kozani
Attendance: 500
Referees: Henrykh Bekish, Zafer Yilmaz, Apostolos Kalpakas

==== Group C ====
Team	Pld	W	L	PF	PA	PD	Pts	Tiebreaker
Turkey	3	2	1	185	175	+10	5	1–0
Netherlands	3	2	1	190	195	−5	5	0–1
Spain	3	1	2	186	186	0	4	1–0
Poland	3	1	2	190	195	−5	4	0–1

August 12
14:15

Report

Netherlands	71–67	Spain
Scoring by quarter: 14–22, 14–12, 21–21, 14–8
Pts: Kourtney Treffers (26); Rebs: Kourtney Treffers (12); Asts: Laura Cornelius (4)		Pts: Irene Gari (22); Rebs: Marlés Balart (8); Asts: Elena De Alfredo (4)

DAK Ptolemaida I, Ptolemaida
Attendance: 70
Referees: Georgios Tanatzis, Ilona Kucerova, Henri Hilke

August 12
16:30

Report

Poland	69–63	Turkey
Scoring by quarter: 19–16, 15–12, 18–17, 17–18
Pts: Beata Jaworska, Kinga Wozniak (14); Rebs: Beata Jaworska, Dominika Miloszewska (9); Asts: Dominika Owczarzak (6)		Pts: Deniz Dogan (17); Rebs: Cansu Köksal (7); Asts: Melek Yusufoglu (3)

DAK Ptolemaida I, Ptolemaida
Attendance: 40
Referees: Iskren Manolov, Henrykh Bekish, Gennadi Ponomarev

August 13
14:15

Report

Spain	65–58	Poland
Scoring by quarter: 18–8, 19–19, 15–16, 13–15
Pts: Marlés Balart (16); Rebs: Marlés Balart (17); Asts: Marlés Balart (5)		Pts: Dominika Owczarzak (22); Rebs: Katarzyna Jaworska (11); Asts: Monika Naczk (4)

Ioannis Skarkalas Hall, Kozani
Attendance: 150
Referees: Miodrag Licina, Vladimir Tsekov, Zoran Zlatevski

August 13
18:45

Report

Turkey	65–52	Netherlands
Scoring by quarter: 19–11, 15–19, 19–15, 12–7
Pts: Cansu Köksal (13); Rebs: Tilbe Senyürek (13); Asts: Merve Aydın (5)		Pts: Britt Zappeij (12); Rebs: Kourtney Treffers (8); Asts: Carmen Droste (2)

Ioannis Skarkalas Hall, Kozani
Attendance: 150
Referees: Virginijus Dovidavicius, Henri Hilke, Maka Kupatadze

August 14
14:15

Report

Poland	63–67	Netherlands
Scoring by quarter: 13−9, 14−21, 17−18, 19−19
Pts: Beata Jaworska (19); Rebs: Dominika Miloszewska (8); Asts: Dominika Owczarzak (3)		Pts: Kourtney Treffers (21); Rebs: Kourtney Treffers, Isabella Slim (11); Asts: Aggy Schalkwijk (3)

DAK Ptolemaida I, Ptolemaida
Attendance: 80
Referees: Carlos Mateus, Aleksandar Milojevik, Jelena Tomic

August 14
21:00

Report

Spain	54–57	Turkey
Scoring by quarter: 20−16, 7−21, 11−14, 16−6
Pts: Elena De Alfredo (13); Rebs: Marlés Balart (10); Asts: Patricia Soler (3)		Pts: Cansu Köksal (16); Rebs: Elif Emirtekin, Tilbe Senyürek (10); Asts: Melek Yusufoglu (2)

DAK Ptolemaida I, Ptolemaida
Attendance: 150
Referees: Enrico Sabetta, Gennadi Ponomarev, Alin Faur

==== Group D ====
Team	Pld	W	L	PF	PA	PD	Pts	Tiebreaker
Belgium	3	3	0	196	156	+40	6	
Greece	3	2	1	163	175	−12	5	
Czech Republic	3	1	2	177	178	−1	4	
Belarus	3	0	3	157	184	−27	3	

August 12
18:45

Report

Greece	45–62	Belgium
Scoring by quarter: 9–15, 4–23, 17–11, 15–13
Pts: Stefania Sideri (13); Rebs: Styliani Fouraki (7); Asts: Eleni Kyratzi (2)		Pts: Heleen Adams (14); Rebs: Harriet Bende (10); Asts: Antonia Delaere (4)

DAK Ptolemaida I, Ptolemaida
Attendance: 150
Referees: Miodrag Licina, Jelena Tomic, Aleksandar Milojevik

August 12
21:00

Report

Czech Republic	60–50	Belarus
Scoring by quarter: 23–8, 6–15, 14–10, 17–17
Pts: Karolina Severova (12); Rebs: Nada Salacova (14); Asts: Nada Salacova (3)		Pts: Hanna Kalenta (24); Rebs: Maryia Papova (13); Asts: Hanna Kalenta (3)

DAK Ptolemaida I, Ptolemaida
Attendance: 25
Referees: Oscar Perea, Enrico Sabetta, Henri Hilke

August 13
16:30

Report

Belarus	56–59	Greece
Scoring by quarter: 16–14, 14–19, 12–19, 14–7
Pts: Hanna Kalenta (16); Rebs: Hanna Kalenta (12); Asts: Maryia Papova (5)		Pts: Stefania Sideri (13); Rebs: Styliani Fouraki (14); Asts: Eleni Kyratzi (4)

Ioannis Skarkalas Hall, Kozani
Attendance: 1,000
Referees: Oscar Perea, Carlos Mateus, Vincent Delestrée

August 13
21:00

Report

Belgium	69–60	Czech Republic
Scoring by quarter: 22–18, 10–11, 15–12, 22–19
Pts: Antonia Delaere (18); Rebs: Heleen Adams (8); Asts: three players (2)		Pts: Tereza Vyoralová (16); Rebs: Nada Salacova (13); Asts: Tereza Vyoralová, Andrea Andelova (2)

Ioannis Skarkalas Hall, Kozani
Attendance: 100
Referees: Iskren Manolov, Alin Faur, Apostolos Kalpakas

August 14
16:30

Report

Czech Republic	57–59	Greece
Scoring by quarter: 16−16, 10−10, 13−12, 18−21
Pts: Tereza Vyoralová (20); Rebs: Nada Salacova, Tereza Vyoralová (8); Asts: Andrea Andelova (2)		Pts: Foteini Priona (13); Rebs: Vasiliki Tarla (16); Asts: Eleni Kyratzi, Stefania Sideri (2)

DAK Ptolemaida I, Ptolemaida
Attendance: 300
Referees: Tomislav Kovacic, Iskren Manolov, Zoran Zlatevski

August 14
18:45

Report

Belgium	65–51	Belarus
Scoring by quarter: 22−17, 10−14, 23−7, 10−13
Pts: Antonia Delaere (18); Rebs: Manon Humblet, Axelle Bernard (5); Asts: Axelle Bernard, Charlotte Heeren (2)		Pts: Hanna Kalenta, Maryia Papova (11); Rebs: Yuliya Haponava (6); Asts: 4 tied with (2)

DAK Ptolemaida I, Ptolemaida
Attendance: 70
Referees: Vladimir Tsekov, Zdravko Rutesic, Francis Santos

=== Qualifying round ===
The twelve teams remaining were allocated in two groups of six teams each. The four top teams advanced to the quarterfinals. The last two teams of each group played for the 9th–12th place.

Team advanced to Quarterfinals
Team competed in 9th–12th playoffs

==== Group E ====
Team	Pld	W	L	PF	PA	PD	Pts	Tiebreaker
Russia	5	4	1	379	194	+85	9	1–1 +10
Croatia	5	4	1	375	316	+59	9	1–1 +1
France	5	4	1	326	284	+42	9	1–1 −11
Serbia	5	2	3	310	282	+28	7	
Sweden	5	1	4	259	351	−92	6	
Finland	5	0	5	237	359	−122	5	

August 16
16:30

Report

Finland	44–78	France
Scoring by quarter: 18−22, 6−16, 9−13, 11−27
Pts: Ella Rantanen (10); Rebs: 3 tied with (4); Asts: 2 tied with (2)		Pts: Clémentine Morateur (15); Rebs: Mousdandy Djaldi-Tabdi (9); Asts: Céline Pfister (6)

Ioannis Skarkalas Hall, Kozani
Attendance: 100

August 16
18:45

Report

Serbia	60–65	Russia
Scoring by quarter: 11−17, 22−13, 19−19, 8−16
Pts: Nataša Kovačević, Aleksandra Stanacev (14); Rebs: Nataša Kovačević, Ivana Boskovic (8); Asts: Nataša Kovačević (3)		Pts: Polina Sych (19); Rebs: Anna Shchetina (11); Asts: 2 tied with (2)

Ioannis Skarkalas Hall, Kozani
Attendance: 250

August 16
21:00

Report

Croatia	68–49	Sweden
Scoring by quarter: 26−16, 13−8, 14−14, 15−11
Pts: Ana-Marija Begić (20); Rebs: Ružica Džankić (11); Asts: Ružica Džankić (4)		Pts: Erica Iderstal (19); Rebs: Paulina Hersler (9); Asts: Johanna Andersson (4)

Ioannis Skarkalas Hall, Kozani
Attendance: 250

August 17
14:15

Report

Serbia	64–38	Finland
Scoring by quarter: 14−11, 20−10, 16−6, 14−11
Pts: Nataša Kovačević (13); Rebs: Jovana Vidaković (7); Asts: Aleksandra Stanaćev (5)		Pts: Anni Kärkkäinen (10); Rebs: Ella Rantanen (5); Asts: 4 tied with (1)

Ioannis Skarkalas Hall, Kozani
Attendance: 50

August 17
18:45

Report

Russia	67–73	Croatia
Scoring by quarter: 14−15, 19−17, 19−20, 15−21
Pts: Julia Gladkova, Polina Sych (12); Rebs: Anna Shchetina (9); Asts: Polina Sych (4)		Pts: Lana Pačkovski (23); Rebs: four players (8); Asts: Ana-Marija Begić, Lana Pačkovski (5)

DAK Ptolemaida I, Ptolemaida
Attendance: 170

August 17
21:00

Report

Sweden	50–65	France
Scoring by quarter: 12−20, 13−19, 10−9, 15−17
Pts: Paulina Hersler (9); Rebs: Paulina Hersler (9); Asts: four players (1)		Pts: Olivia Epoupa, Mousdandy Djaldi-Tabdi (12); Rebs: Mousdandy Djaldi-Tabdi (10); Asts: Valeriane Ayayi, Olivia Epoupa (2)

DAK Ptolemaida I, Ptolemaida
Attendance: 130

August 18
14:15

Report

Croatia	70–54	Finland
Scoring by quarter: 9−13, 19−14, 17−8, 25−19
Pts: Ivana Tikvić (14); Rebs: Ana-Marija Begić; Asts: Anja Majstorović (3)		Pts: Anni Kärkkäinen (17); Rebs: Vilma Purhonen (8); Asts: four players (1)

Ioannis Skarkalas Hall, Kozani
Attendance: 50

August 18
16:30

Report

France	54–70	Russia
Scoring by quarter: 11−17, 18−19, 15−17, 10−17
Pts: Olivia Epoupa (14); Rebs: Olivia Epoupa (10); Asts: Olivia Epoupa (4)		Pts: Alexandra Marchenkova (15); Rebs: Albina Razheva (8); Asts: Olga Novikova (3)

Ioannis Skarkalas Hall, Kozani
Attendance: 400

August 18
21:00

Report

Sweden	39–73	Serbia
Scoring by quarter: 11−16, 15−25, 4−21, 9−11
Pts: Linnea Frykbo (11); Rebs: Paulina Hersler, Iris Strömberg (6); Asts: Johanna Andersson (2)		Pts: Nataša Kovačević (23); Rebs: Nataša Kovačević (9); Asts: three players (2)

Ioannis Skarkalas Hall, Kozani
Attendance: 150

==== Group F ====
Team	Pld	W	L	PF	PA	PD	Pts	Tiebreaker
Turkey	5	5	0	326	260	+66	10	
Spain	5	3	2	277	263	+14	8	1–0
Belgium	5	3	2	307	307	0	8	0–1
Netherlands	5	2	3	299	310	–11	7	
Greece	5	1	4	233	284	–51	6	1–0
Czech Republic	5	1	4	279	297	–18	6	0–1

August 16
14:15

Report

Czech Republic	55–67	Turkey
Scoring by quarter: 16–18, 13–20, 12–16, 14–13
Pts: 3 tied with (12); Rebs: Nada Salacova (15); Asts: 2 tied with (2)		Pts: Doga Comba (14); Rebs: Hülya Coklar (7); Asts: 3 tied with (3)

Ioannis Skarkalas Hall, Kozani
Attendance: 40

August 16
18:45

Report

Greece	50–60	Netherlands
Scoring by quarter: 15–13, 11–13, 11–12, 13–22
Pts: Vasiliki Tarla (15); Rebs: Styliani Fouraki (12); Asts: Eleni Kyratzi (4)		Pts: Kourtney Treffers (20); Rebs: Kourtney Treffers (11); Asts: 2 tied with (2)

DAK Ptolemaida I, Ptolemaida
Attendance: 500

August 16
21:00

Report

Spain	61–48	Belgium
Scoring by quarter: 15–22, 18–18, 20–2, 8–6
Pts: Maria Arrojo (12); Rebs: 3 tied with (8); Asts: Marlés Balart (3)		Pts: Heleen Adams (16); Rebs: Antonia Delaere (10); Asts: Heleen Adams (3)

DAK Ptolemaida I, Ptolemaida
Attendance: 150

August 17
16:30

Report

Czech Republic	44–50	Spain
Scoring by quarter: 15–9, 13–12, 6–12, 10–17
Pts: Tereza Vyoralová (13); Rebs: Karolina Severova (8); Asts: Tereza Vyoralová (3)		Pts: Marlés Balart (14); Rebs: Marlés Balart (11); Asts: Marlés Balart, Marta Montoliu (2)

Ioannis Skarkalas Hall, Kozani
Attendance: 150

August 17
18:45

Report

Turkey	60–36	Greece
Scoring by quarter: 17–2, 13–17, 17–6, 13–11
Pts: Deniz Dogan (15); Rebs: Cansu Köksal (11); Asts: Merve Aydın, Cansu Köksal (3)		Pts: Elisavet Kotoula (10); Rebs: Vasiliki Tarla (10); Asts: three players (1)

Ioannis Skarkalas Hall, Kozani
Attendance: 1,200

August 17
21:00

Report

Netherlands	64–65 (OT)	Belgium
Scoring by quarter: 16–11, 16–14, 13–18, 12–14, Overtime: 7–8
Pts: Kourtney Treffers (26); Rebs: Kourtney Treffers (11); Asts: three players (2)		Pts: Antonia Delaere (18); Rebs: Harriet Bende (10); Asts: Antonia Delaere (4)

Ioannis Skarkalas Hall, Kozani
Attendance: 500

August 18
18:45

Report

Belgium	63–77	Turkey
Scoring by quarter: 18–24, 14–20, 11–12, 20–21
Pts: Heleen Adams (16); Rebs: Harriet Bende (8); Asts: Hind Ben Abdelkader (4)		Pts: Merve Aydın (20); Rebs: Cansu Köksal (10); Asts: Merve Aydın (4)

Ioannis Skarkalas Hall, Kozani
Attendance: 100

August 18
18:45

Report

Greece	43–45	Spain
Scoring by quarter: 5–14, 15–12, 9–7, 14–15
Pts: Foteini Priona, Vasiliki Tarla (9); Rebs: Styliani Fouraki (10); Asts: Eleni Kyratzi, Maria Papavasileiou (2)		Pts: Marlés Balart (11); Rebs: Marlés Balart (28); Asts: Marlés Balart (3)

DAK Ptolemaida I, Ptolemaida
Attendance: 1,200

August 18
21:00

Report

Netherlands	52–63	Czech Republic
Scoring by quarter: 10–20, 15–15, 11–8, 16–20
Pts: Kourtney Treffers (22); Rebs: Kourtney Treffers (10); Asts: Laura Cornelius, Naomi Harris (1)		Pts: Tereza Vyoralová (12); Rebs: Nada Salacova (14); Asts: Karolina Severova (3)

DAK Ptolemaida I, Ptolemaida
Attendance: 110

=== Classification round ===
The last teams of each group in the preliminary round will compete in this Classification round. The four teams will play in one group. The last two teams will be relegated to Division B for the next season.

Team will be relegated to Division B.

==== Group G ====
Team	Pld	W	L	PF	PA	PD	Pts	Tiebreaker
Italy	6	5	1	395	318	+77	11	
Poland	6	3	3	357	321	+36	9	1–1 +34
Belarus	6	3	3	282	318	–36	9	1–1 –34
Lithuania	6	1	5	288	365	–77	7	

August 16
14:15

Report

Italy	79–70	Poland
Scoring by quarter: 16–14, 15–23, 18–18, 30–15
Pts: Antonia Peresson (20); Rebs: Francesca Minali (14); Asts: 2 tied with (2)		Pts: Kinga Wozniak (22); Rebs: Dominika Miloszewska (11); Asts: Dominika Owczarzak (8)

DAK Ptolemaida I, Ptolemaida
Attendance: 35

August 16
16:30

Report

Lithuania	37–51	Belarus
Scoring by quarter: 10–18, 9–11, 10–8, 8–14
Pts: Gerda Kruckauskaite (11); Rebs: Justina Matuzonyte (8); Asts: 4 tied with (1)		Pts: Maryia Papova (20); Rebs: Maryia Papova (16); Asts: Maryia Papova (5)

DAK Ptolemaida I, Ptolemaida
Attendance: 45

August 17
14:15

Report

Belarus	36–57	Italy
Scoring by quarter: 14–6, 10–24, 5–11, 7–16
Pts: Maryia Papova (12); Rebs: Maryia Papova (14); Asts: Hanna Kalenta (5)		Pts: Antonia Peresson (12); Rebs: Francesca Minali (9); Asts: Elisabetta Mazzoleni (3)

DAK Ptolemaida I, Ptolemaida
Attendance: 25

August 17
16:30

Report

Poland	55–48	Lithuania
Scoring by quarter: 14–4, 19–14, 16–19, 6–11
Pts: Maja Rynkiewicz (11); Rebs: Daria Marciniak (7); Asts: Monika Naczk (4)		Pts: Egle Zelnyte (17); Rebs: Laura Zelnyte (11); Asts: Gintare Jasiunskaite (3)

DAK Ptolemaida I, Ptolemaida
Attendance: 50

August 18
14:15

Report

Lithuania	46–76	Italy
Scoring by quarter: 12–18, 18–21, 8–15, 8–22
Pts: Gerda Kruckauskaite, Simona Dobrovolskyte (10); Rebs: Justina Matuzonyte (8); Asts: Egle Zilyte (2)		Pts: Marida Orazzo (15); Rebs: three players (6); Asts: Eleonora Zanetti (5)

DAK Ptolemaida I, Ptolemaida
Attendance: 30

August 18
16:30

Report

Poland	66–27	Belarus
Scoring by quarter: 26–2, 7–4, 14–13, 19–8
Pts: Dominika Miloszewska (14); Rebs: Beata Jaworska (14); Asts: Dominika Owczarzak (5)		Pts: Yuliya Haponava (9); Rebs: Maryia Papova, Katsiaryna Pratasevich (6); Asts: Yuliya Haponava (2)

DAK Ptolemaida I, Ptolemaida
Attendance: 40

August 20
14:15

Report

Belarus	67–44	Lithuania
Scoring by quarter: 22–14, 12–13, 21–10, 12–7
Pts: Ksenija Voishal (16); Rebs: Maryia Papova (11); Asts: Maryia Papova (4)		Pts: Ieva Kazlauskaite (10); Rebs: Laura Zelnyte (9); Asts: Dovile Latonaite (2)

DAK Ptolemaida I, Ptolemaida
Attendance: 30

August 20
16:30

Report

Poland	58–61	Italy
Scoring by quarter: 14–11, 16–17, 11–12, 17–21
Pts: Dominika Miloszewska, Marlena Blicharz (14); Rebs: Dominika Miloszewska (12); Asts: Monika Naczk, Kinga Wozniak (5)		Pts: Giulia Gombac (13); Rebs: Francesca Minali (11); Asts: Giulia Gombac (2)

DAK Ptolemaida I, Ptolemaida
Attendance: 30

August 21
14:15

Report

Lithuania	51–58	Poland
Scoring by quarter: 17–10, 13–16, 10–19, 11–13
Pts: Greta Tamasauskaite (14); Rebs: Inga Brusokaite (11); Asts: Greta Tamasauskaite (4)		Pts: Marlena Blicharz (16); Rebs: Beata Jaworska, Dominika Miloszewska (10); Asts: Dominika Owczarzak (4)

DAK Ptolemaida I, Ptolemaida
Attendance: 15

August 21
16:30

Report

Italy	64–46	Belarus
Scoring by quarter: 17–11, 16–14, 14–10, 17–11
Pts: Giulia Scaramuzza (12); Rebs: Francesca Minali (10); Asts: Elena Ramò, Giulia Scaramuzza (3)		Pts: Yuliya Haponava (14); Rebs: Yuliya Haponava (12); Asts: Maryia Papova (5)

DAK Ptolemaida I, Ptolemaida
Attendance: 70
Referees: Ilona Kucerova, Maka Kupatadze, Jelena Tomic

August 22
14:00

Report

Italy	58–62	Lithuania
Scoring by quarter: 16–24, 10–14, 11–11, 21–13
Pts: Erica Reggiani (16); Rebs: Eleonora Zizola (9); Asts: Erica Reggiani (4)		Pts: Laura Zelnyte (14); Rebs: Inga Brusokaite (9); Asts: Gintare Jasiunskaite, Laura Zelnyte (2)

DAK Ptolemaida I, Ptolemaida
Referees: Janusz Calik, Gennadi Ponomarev, Zafer Yilmaz

August 22
16:15

Belarus	55–50	Poland

DAK Ptolemaida I, Ptolemaida

== Knockout round ==
=== Championship ===
Quarter-finals
August 20 – Kozani
Russia	80
Netherlands	58
August 20 – Kozani
Spain	57
France	60
August 20 – Kozani
Croatia	56
Belgium	51
August 20 – Kozani
Turkey	49
Serbia	54

Semi-finals
August 21 – Kozani
Russia	66
France	59
August 21 – Kozani
Croatia	64
Serbia	51

Final
August 22 – Kozani
Russia	71
Croatia	53
Third place
August 22 – Kozani
France	50
Serbia	44

==== Quarterfinals ====
August 20
14:15

Report

Russia	80–58	Netherlands
Scoring by quarter: 20–19, 19–13, 23–14, 18–12
Pts: Alexandra Marchenkova (19); Rebs: Alexandra Marchenkova (10); Asts: Ekaterina Ryabova, Natalia Grishkevich (3)		Pts: Kourtney Treffers (23); Rebs: Kourtney Treffers (13); Asts: Inez van Hulsen (3)

Ioannis Skarkalas Hall, Kozani
Attendance: 100

August 20
16:30

Report

Croatia	56–51	Belgium
Scoring by quarter: 12–14, 18–11, 13–14, 13–12
Pts: Andrijana Cvitković (17); Rebs: three players (8); Asts: four players (1)		Pts: Camille Lebrun (20); Rebs: Heleen Adams (6); Asts: Heleen Adams (7)

Ioannis Skarkalas Hall, Kozani
Attendance: 130

August 20
18:45

Report

Turkey	49–54	Serbia
Scoring by quarter: 19–12, 9–7, 10–16, 11–19
Pts: Didem Nakas (15); Rebs: Tilbe Senyürek (13); Asts: Merve Aydın (3)		Pts: Nataša Kovačević (17); Rebs: Nataša Kovačević (14); Asts: Sanja Mandić (4)

Ioannis Skarkalas Hall, Kozani
Attendance: 250

August 20
21:00

Report

Spain	57–60	France
Scoring by quarter: 15–21, 14–9, 18–19, 10–11
Pts: Elena De Alfredo (19); Rebs: Maria Arrojo (13); Asts: Irene Gari (3)		Pts: Olivia Epoupa (21); Rebs: Marième Badiane, Mousdandy Djaldi-Tabdi (9); Asts: Olivia Epoupa (5)

Ioannis Skarkalas Hall, Kozani
Attendance: 250

==== Semifinals ====
August 21
18:45

Report

Russia	66–59	France
Scoring by quarter: 18–7, 11–11, 18–16, 19–25
Pts: Anna Shchetina (19); Rebs: Anna Shchetina (15); Asts: three players (2)		Pts: Olivia Epoupa (19); Rebs: Axelle Koundouno (8); Asts: Olivia Epoupa (6)

Ioannis Skarkalas Hall, Kozani
Attendance: 500
Referees: Miodrag Licina, Enrico Sabetta, Janusz Calik

August 21
21:00

Report

Croatia	64–51	Serbia
Scoring by quarter: 18–8, 11–12, 18–13, 17–18
Pts: Ana-Marija Begić, Ružica Džankić (12); Rebs: Ana-Marija Begić, Ružica Džankić (10); Asts: Ružica Džankić (4)		Pts: Nataša Kovačević (18); Rebs: Nataša Kovačević (9); Asts: three players (3)

Ioannis Skarkalas Hall, Kozani
Attendance: 800
Referees: Virginijus Dovidavicius, Vladimir Tsekov, Carlos Mateus

==== Bronze-medal game ====
August 22
17:45

Report

France	50–44	Serbia
Scoring by quarter: 10–12, 18–7, 11–15, 11–10
Pts: Valeriane Ayayi, Olivia Epoupa (11); Rebs: Axelle Koundouno (13); Asts: Olivia Epoupa (6)		Pts: Nataša Kovačević (13); Rebs: Nataša Kovačević (7); Asts: Aleksandra Stanaćev (3)

Ioannis Skarkalas Hall, Kozani
Attendance: 1,200
Referees: Henrykh Bekish, Iskren Manolov, Oscar Perea

==== Final ====
August 22
20:00

Report

Russia	71–53	Croatia
Scoring by quarter: 25–17, 13–11, 18–16, 15–9
Pts: Anna Shchetina (15); Rebs: Olga Novikova (9); Asts: Julia Gladkova, Olga Novikova (3)		Pts: Andrijana Cvitković (17); Rebs: Andrijana Cvitković (9); Asts: Lana Pačkovski (3)

Ioannis Skarkalas Hall, Kozani
Attendance: 1,500
Referees: Georgios Tanatzis, Zdravko Rutesic, Maka Kupatadze

=== 5th–8th playoffs ===
Semi-finals
August 21 – Kozani
Netherlands	36
Spain	52
August 21 – Kozani
Belgium	45
Turkey	62

Fifth place
August 22 – Kozani
Spain	45
Turkey	39
Seventh place
August 22 – Kozani
Netherlands	65
Belgium	56

==== 5th–8th semifinals ====
August 21
14:15

Report

Netherlands	36–52	Spain
Scoring by quarter: 9–21, 6–9, 5–12, 16–10
Pts: Jacobine Klerx (9); Rebs: Britt Zappeij (6); Asts: four players (1)		Pts: Marlés Balart, Marta Montoliu (9); Rebs: Marlés Balart (9); Asts: Marlés Balart (3)

Ioannis Skarkalas Hall, Kozani
Attendance: 300
Referees: Zdravko Rutesic, Apostolos Kalpakas, Zoran Zlatevski

August 21
16:30

Report

Belgium	45–62	Turkey
Scoring by quarter: 15–15, 8–18, 14–16, 8–13
Pts: Antonia Delaere (14); Rebs: Camille Lebrun (6); Asts: Antonia Delaere (5)		Pts: Hülya Coklar (12); Rebs: Doga Comba (9); Asts: Deniz Dogan (4)

Ioannis Skarkalas Hall, Kozani
Attendance: 150
Referees: Aleksandar Milojevik, Gennadi Ponomarev, Alin Faur

==== 7th place playoff ====
August 22
13:15

Report

Netherlands	65–56	Belgium
Scoring by quarter: 21–18, 17–11, 9–14, 18–13
Pts: Kourtney Treffers (12); Rebs: Kourtney Treffers (10); Asts: Isabella Slim (3)		Pts: Hind Ben Abdelkader (16); Rebs: Axelle Bernard (6); Asts: Jolien Goyvaerts (2)

Ioannis Skarkalas Hall, Kozani
Attendance: 200
Referees: Carlos Mateus, Henri Hilke, Francis Santos

==== 5th place playoff ====
August 22
15:30

Report

Spain	45–39	Turkey
Scoring by quarter: 10–13, 5–11, 13–7, 17–8
Pts: Irene Gari (19); Rebs: Maria Arrojo (11); Asts: Elena De Alfredo (3)		Pts: Merve Aydın (12); Rebs: Tilbe Senyürek (16); Asts: three players (2)

Ioannis Skarkalas Hall, Kozani
Attendance: 200
Referees: Aleksandar Milojevik, Ilona Kucerova, Vincent Delestrée

=== 9th–12th playoffs ===
Semi-finals
August 20 – Ptolemaida
Sweden	51
Czech Republic	57
August 20 – Ptolemaida
Greece	62
Finland	60

Ninth place
August 21 – Ptolemaida
Czech Republic	78
Greece	52
Eleventh place
August 21 – Ptolemaida
Sweden	64
Finland	62

==== 9th–12th semifinals ====
August 20
18:45

Report

Sweden	51–57	Czech Republic
Scoring by quarter: 12–15, 12–14, 7–14, 20–14
Pts: Paulina Hersler (15); Rebs: Agnes Mellström (9); Asts: Raushan Gültekin (2)		Pts: Dominika Pohunková, Nada Salacova (11); Rebs: Tereza Vyoralová, Nada Salacova (6); Asts: Dominika Pohunková (2)

DAK Ptolemaida I, Ptolemaida
Attendance: 80

August 20
21:00

Report

Greece	62–60	Finland
Scoring by quarter: 18–15, 3–17, 18–15, 23–13
Pts: Maria Papavasileiou (15); Rebs: Styliani Fouraki (11); Asts: Eleni Kyratzi (4)		Pts: three players (10); Rebs: Ella Rantanen (8); Asts: Anni Kärkkäinen (2)

DAK Ptolemaida I, Ptolemaida
Attendance: 450

==== 11th place playoff ====
August 21
18:45

Report

Sweden	64–62 (OT)	Finland
Scoring by quarter: 13–21, 9–10, 16–9, 18–16, Overtime: 8–6
Pts: Paulina Hersler (16); Rebs: Paulina Hersler (13); Asts: Iris Strömberg (5)		Pts: Anni Kärkkäinen (15); Rebs: Anni Kärkkäinen (7); Asts: Noora Korhonen, Jenni Rantanen (2)

DAK Ptolemaida I, Ptolemaida
Attendance: 50
Referees: Henrykh Bekish, Zafer Yilmaz, Vincent Delestrée

==== 9th place playoff ====
August 21
21:00

Report

Czech Republic	78–52	Greece
Scoring by quarter: 26–11, 21–6, 22–22, 9–13
Pts: Dominika Pohunková (11); Rebs: Nada Salacova (10); Asts: Dominika Pohunková (5)		Pts: Eleni Kyratzi (12); Rebs: Styliani Fouraki (12); Asts: Maria Papavasileiou (6)

DAK Ptolemaida I, Ptolemaida
Attendance: 450
Referees: Tomislav Kovacic, Iskren Manolov, Francis Santos

== Final standings ==
Rank	Team	Record
1st place, gold medalist(s)	Russia	8–1
2nd place, silver medalist(s)	Croatia	7–2
3rd place, bronze medalist(s)	France	7–2
4th	Serbia	4–5
5th	Spain	6–3
6th	Turkey	6–3
7th	Netherlands	4–5
8th	Belgium	4–5
9th	Czech Republic	4–4
10th	Greece	3–5
11th	Sweden	3–5
12th	Finland	1–7
13th	Italy	5–4
14th	Poland	4–5
15th	Belarus	3–6
16th	Lithuania	1–8

Relegated to the 2011 FIBA Europe Under-16 Championship for Women Division B

== Awards ==
2010 FIBA Europe Under-16 Championship for Women winner

Russia
Fourth title

Most Valuable Player
(France) Olivia Epoupa

All-Tournament Team

- (France) Olivia Epoupa
- (Croatia) Lana Pačkovski
- (Serbia) Nataša Kovačević
- (Netherlands) Kourtney Treffers
- (Russia) Anna Shchetina

Fair Play Award

- Netherlands

== Statistical leaders ==
Points

Name	PPG
(Netherlands) Kourtney Treffers	18.6
(France) Olivia Epoupa	17.9
(Serbia) Nataša Kovačević	16.6
(Sweden) Paulina Hersler	13.4
(Croatia) Ružica Džankić	13.3

Rebounds

Name	RPG
(Spain) Marlés Balart	12.1
(Greece) Styliani Fouraki	10.8
(Czech Republic) Nada Salacova	10.8
(Belarus) Maryia Papova	10.3
(Netherlands) Kourtney Treffers	9.9

Assists

Name	APG
(Poland) Dominika Owczarzak	4.3
(Croatia) Lana Pačkovski	4.0
(France) Olivia Epoupa	3.8
(Belarus) Maryia Papova	3.0
(Poland) Monika Naczk	2.8

Blocks

Name	BPG
(Belarus) Hanna Kalenta	3.9
(Russia) Anna Shchetina	2.6
(Lithuania) Egle Zelnyte	2.6
(Croatia) Ivana Tikvić	2.1
(France) Mariéme Badiane	2.0

Steals

Name	SPG
(France) Olivia Epoupa	4.1
(Serbia) Nataša Kovačević	3.6
(Turkey) Merve Aydın	3.2
(Netherlands) Isabella Slim	2.8
(Croatia) Ivana Tikvić	2.8
