= 2013 FIBA Under-19 World Championship for Women =

Tournament details
- Host country: Lithuania
- Cities: Klaipėda, Panevėžys
- Dates: 18–28 July
- Teams: 16 (from 5 confederations)
- Venues: 2 (in 2 host cities)

Final positions
- Champions: United States (6th title)

Tournament statistics
- MVP: (United States) Breanna Stewart
- Top scorer: (Brazil) Ramona (18.2)
- Top rebounds: (South Korea) Park Ji-Su (13.2)
- Top assists: (Japan) Tamura (5.9)
- PPG (Team): United States (91.6)
- RPG (Team): United States (53.7)
- APG (Team): United States (21.2)

Official website
- web.archive.org

The 2013 FIBA Under-19 World Championship for Women (Lithuanian: 2013 m. FIBA iki 19 metų pasaulio moterų čempionatas) was hosted by Lithuania from 18 to 28 July 2013.

The United States won their fifth straight and sixth overall title by defeating France 69–63 in the final.

== Format ==
Teams played a round robin in the preliminary round, with the top three teams advancing to the main round. The teams played against the teams from the other groups. The top four teams advanced to the knockout stage.

== Qualified teams ==
Means of qualification	Date	Venue	Berths	Qualified
Host nation	3 May 2012		1	Lithuania
2012 FIBA Europe Under-18 Championship for Women	26 July – 5 August 2012	Romania	5	France; Netherlands; Russia; Serbia; Spain
2012 FIBA Americas Under-18 Championship for Women	15 – 19 August 2012	Puerto Rico	4	Argentina; Brazil; Canada; United States
2012 FIBA Asia Under-18 Championship for Women	29 September – 6 October 2012	Malaysia	3	China; Japan; South Korea
2012 FIBA Africa Under-18 Championship for Women	22 – 29 September 2012	Senegal	2	Mali; Senegal
2012 FIBA Oceania Under-18 Championship for Women		Australia	1	Australia
Total			16	

== Group stage ==
The draw for the tournament was held on 17 January 2013 in Vilnius, Lithuania.

=== Group A ===
Team	Pld	W	L	PF	PA	PD	Pts
Brazil	3	3	0	242	210	+32	6
Russia	3	2	1	225	195	+30	5
Serbia	3	1	2	205	232	−27	4
South Korea	3	0	3	238	273	−35	3

18 July 2013
12:45

Boxscore

Brazil	66–63	Russia
Scoring by quarter: 5–13, 22–12, 16–19, 23–19
Pts: Gonçalves 16; Rebs: Arias 7 Asts: Ramona 6		Pts: Novikova 17; Rebs: Shchetina 13; Asts: Sych 5

Švyturys Arena, Klaipėda
Referees: Pualani Thelma Spurlock (USA), Renaud Geller (BEL), Alexander Eger (AUT)

18 July 2013
15:00

Boxscore

Serbia	88–79	South Korea
Scoring by quarter: 19–20, 24–17, 23–21, 22–21
Pts: Kovačević 25; Rebs: Topuzović 11; Asts: Vučković 6		Pts: Park Ji-Su 19; Rebs: Park Ji-Su 13; Asts: Kim Lee-Seul 6

Švyturys Arena, Klaipėda
Referees: Yudith Hodelin Mendoza (CUB), Zoltán Palla (HUN), Anne Panther (GER)

19 July 2013
13:30

Boxscore

South Korea	81–96	Brazil
Scoring by quarter: 21–19, 7–27, 20–30, 33–20
Pts: You Seung-Hee 25; Rebs: Park Ji-Su 11; Asts: Park Ji-Su 3		Pts: Ramona 22; Rebs: Gonçalves 11; Asts: Gonçalves 6

Švyturys Arena, Klaipėda
Referees: Tomas Jasevičius (LTU), Cheung Kwok Shun Andy (HKG), Abdelaziz Abassi (TUN)

19 July 2013
15:45

Boxscore

Russia	73–51	Serbia
Scoring by quarter: 17–21, 18–9, 25–12, 13–9
Pts: Shchetina 21; Rebs: Chaykovskaya 10; Asts: Novikova 6		Pts: Topuzović 13; Rebs: Kovačević 7 Asts: Stanaćev 2

Švyturys Arena, Klaipėda
Referees: Seffi Shemmesh (ISR), Maripier Malo (CAN), Wen Keming (CHN)

20 July 2013
13:30

Boxscore

Brazil	80–66	Serbia
Scoring by quarter: 13–18, 14–13, 27–17, 26–18
Pts: Ramona 20; Rebs: de Oliveira 9 Asts: Ramona 6		Pts: Vučković 16; Rebs: Crvendakić 7 Asts: Kovačević, Stanaćev 4

Švyturys Arena, Klaipėda
Referees: Renaud Geller (BEL), Yudith Hodelin Mendoza (CUB), Abdelaziz Abassi (TUN)

20 July 2013
15:45

Boxscore

South Korea	78–89	Russia
Scoring by quarter: 19–14, 25–30, 18–23, 16–22
Pts: Kim Si-On 16; Rebs: Park Ji-Su 18; Asts: Kim Lee-Seul 9		Pts: Razheva 20; Rebs: Shchetina 9 Asts: Novikova 6

Švyturys Arena, Klaipėda
Referees: Anne Panther (GER), Zoltán Palla (HUN), Aledy Blanco Jiménez (CRC)

=== Group B ===
Team	Pld	W	L	PF	PA	PD	Pts
Spain	3	3	0	233	165	+68	6
Australia	3	2	1	228	211	+17	5
Japan	3	1	2	228	248	−20	4
Argentina	3	0	3	148	213	−65	3

18 July 2013
18:00

Boxscore

Argentina	48–69	Australia
Scoring by quarter: 11–18, 11–17, 10–16, 16–20
Pts: Llorente, Armesto 10; Rebs: Marchizotti 7 Asts: Sancisi, Chelini 2		Pts: Wilson 16; Rebs: Brown 12; Asts: three players 4

Švyturys Arena, Klaipėda
Referees: Tomas Jasevičius (LTU), Aledy Blanco Jiménez (CRC), Abdelaziz Abassi (TUN)

18 July 2013
20:15

Boxscore

Japan	70–84	Spain
Scoring by quarter: 14–15, 11–23, 28–26, 17–20
Pts: Kawamura 21; Rebs: Hatakenaka 8 Asts: Tamura 7		Pts: Ndour 20; Rebs: Ndour 11; Asts: Gari 7

Švyturys Arena, Klaipėda
Referees: Seffi Shemmesh (ISR), Maripier Malo (CAN), Cheung Kwok Shun Andy (HKG)

19 July 2013
18:00

Boxscore

Spain	68–32	Argentina
Scoring by quarter: 21–4, 18–12, 15–3, 14–13
Pts: Ndour 12; Rebs: Montoliu 9 Asts: Montoliu 4		Pts: Llorente 8 Rebs: Aispura 11; Asts: Chelini 3

Švyturys Arena, Klaipėda
Referees: Renaud Geller (BEL), Zoltán Palla (HUN), Anne Panther (GER)

19 July 2013
20:15

Boxscore

Australia	96–82	Japan
Scoring by quarter: 18–21, 18–15, 31–27, 29–19
Pts: Wilson 22; Rebs: Garbin 14; Asts: Talbot 12		Pts: Tamura 19; Rebs: Kawamura 7 Asts: Tamura 15

Švyturys Arena, Klaipėda
Referees: Yudith Hodelin Mendoza (CUB), Pualani Thelma Spurlock (USA), Aledy Blanco Jiménez (CRC)

20 July 2013
18:00

Boxscore

Argentina	68–76	Japan
Scoring by quarter: 11–16, 10–11, 23–26, 24–23
Pts: Llorente 21; Rebs: Llorente 12; Asts: Sancisi 9		Pts: Kuma 16; Rebs: three players 9 Asts: three players 3

Švyturys Arena, Klaipėda
Referees: Seffi Shemmesh (ISR), Cheung Kwok Shun Andy (HKG), Maripier Malo (CAN)

20 July 2013
20:15

Boxscore

Spain	81–63	Australia
Scoring by quarter: 12–20, 27–22, 27–12, 15–9
Pts: Ndour 24; Rebs: Ndour, Arrojo 10; Asts: Arrojo 3		Pts: Samuels 16; Rebs: Talbot 8 Asts: Samuels 4

Švyturys Arena, Klaipėda
Referees: Tomas Jasevičius (LTU), Pualani Thelma Spurlock (USA), Wen Keming (CHN)

=== Group C ===
Team	Pld	W	L	PF	PA	PD	Pts
France	3	3	0	223	141	+82	6
Canada	3	2	1	149	132	+17	5
Netherlands	3	1	2	209	201	+8	4
Senegal	3	0	3	74	181	−107	3

18 July 2013
12:45

Boxscore

Canada	20–0	Senegal

Cido Arena, Panevėžys

18 July 2013
15:00

Boxscore

France	81–58	Netherlands
Scoring by quarter: 18–12, 14–23, 26–14, 23–9
Pts: Epoupa 14; Rebs: Badiane 17; Asts: Epoupa, Lithard 3		Pts: Treffers 9 Rebs: Treffers 10; Asts: de Jonge 3

Cido Arena, Panevėžys
Referees: Vander Lobosco Nunes (BRA), Milos Koljensic (MNE), Timothy Brown (NZL)

19 July 2013
13:30

Boxscore

Senegal	23–77	France
Scoring by quarter: 2–16, 6–26, 12–18, 3–17
Pts: Diallo 7 Rebs: Diallo 7 Asts: three players 1		Pts: Epoupa, Ayayi 13; Rebs: Badiane 14; Asts: Epoupa 5

Cido Arena, Panevėžys
Referees: Saverio Lanzarini (ITA), Fabricio Leonardo Vito (ARG), Ilya Putenko (RUS)

19 July 2013
15:45

Boxscore

Netherlands	67–69	Canada
Scoring by quarter: 18–17, 7–18, 17–14, 25–20
Pts: Treffers 17; Rebs: Slim 8 Asts: Cornelius 6		Pts: Weisner 33; Rebs: Weisner 10; Asts: Cooper 4

Cido Arena, Panevėžys
Referees: Özlem Yalman (TUR), Kim Bo-Hui (KOR), Ceciline Victor (IND)

20 July 2013
13:30

Boxscore

Netherlands	84–51	Senegal
Scoring by quarter: 26–11, 19–9, 19–18, 20–13
Pts: Treffers 16; Rebs: Treffers 13; Asts: Slim 4		Pts: Ndao 19; Rebs: Diallo 12; Asts: Ba 2

Cido Arena, Panevėžys
Referees: Vander Lobosco Nunes (BRA), Alexander Eger (AUT), Timothy Brown (NZL)

20 July 2013
15:45

Boxscore

Canada	60–65	France
Scoring by quarter: 25–8, 7–29, 14–13, 14–11
Pts: Weisner 14; Rebs: Cooper 8 Asts: Colley 4		Pts: Touré 16; Rebs: Ayayi 13; Asts: Epoupa 6

Cido Arena, Panevėžys
Referees: Milos Koljensic (MNE), Krishna Viveros (MEX), Jelena Tomić (CRO)

=== Group D ===
Team	Pld	W	L	PF	PA	PD	Pts
United States	3	3	0	319	129	+190	6
China	3	2	1	231	212	+19	5
Lithuania	3	1	2	196	241	−45	4
Mali	3	0	3	120	284	−164	3

18 July 2013
18:00

Boxscore

United States	113–47	Lithuania
Scoring by quarter: 38–15, 29–16, 31–9, 15–7
Pts: Stewart 26; Rebs: three players 7 Asts: Tuck 6		Pts: Kazlauskaitė 14; Rebs: Belickaitė 5 Asts: Kraujunaitė 3

Cido Arena, Panevėžys
Referees: Saverio Lanzarini (ITA), Fabricio Leonardo Vito (ARG), Kim Bo-Hui (KOR)

18 July 2013
20:15

Boxscore

Mali	44–97	China
Scoring by quarter: 5–27, 14–27, 12–17, 13–26
Pts: A. Traore 13; Rebs: Toure 6 Asts: Koné 3		Pts: Gong Li, Li Meng 16; Rebs: Gong Li 8 Asts: Yang Liwei 8

Cido Arena, Panevėžys
Referees: Ilya Putenko (RUS), Özlem Yalman (TUR), Ceciline Victor (IND)

19 July 2013
18:00

Boxscore

Lithuania	84–50	Mali
Scoring by quarter: 24–10, 13–12, 25–17, 22–11
Pts: Mizgerytė 25; Rebs: Mizgerytė 16; Asts: Tamasauskaitė 5		Pts: Maiga 14; Rebs: Dakouo 6 Asts: H. Traore 3

Cido Arena, Panevėžys
Referees: Timothy Brown (NZL), Krishna Viveros (MEX), Jelena Tomić (CRO)

19 July 2013
20:15

Boxscore

China	56–103	United States
Scoring by quarter: 18–23, 9–21, 13–29, 16–30
Pts: Hu Yaoming 11; Rebs: Yang Liwei 4 Asts: Yang Liwei 4		Pts: Stewart 20; Rebs: Wilson 10; Asts: Jones 5

Cido Arena, Panevėžys
Referees: Alexander Eger (AUT), Milos Koljensic (MNE), Vander Lobosco Nunes (BRA)

20 July 2013
18:00

Boxscore

Lithuania	65–78	China
Scoring by quarter: 17–26, 13–19, 17–15, 18–18
Pts: Mizgerytė 23; Rebs: Mizgerytė 15; Asts: Belickaitė 8		Pts: Yang Liwei 20; Rebs: Gong Li 9 Asts: Yang Liwei 8

Cido Arena, Panevėžys
Referees: Saverio Lanzarini (ITA), Ceciline Victor (IND), Özlem Yalman (TUR)

20 July 2013
20:15

Boxscore

Mali	26–103	United States
Scoring by quarter: 6–35, 4–26, 7–25, 9–17
Pts: Guindo 7 Rebs: Camara 5 Asts: Kanoute 3		Pts: Stewart 17; Rebs: Wilson 12; Asts: Green 7

Cido Arena, Panevėžys
Referees: Fabricio Leonardo Vito (ARG), Kim Bo-Hui (KOR), Ilya Putenko (RUS)

== Classification round ==
=== 13th–16th place ===
Team	Pld	W	L	PF	PA	PD	Pts
South Korea	3	3	0	260	181	+79	6
Argentina	3	2	1	192	178	+14	5
Mali	3	1	2	155	175	−20	4
Senegal	3	0	3	133	206	−73	3

22 July 2013
11:15

Boxscore

Senegal	29–47	Mali
Scoring by quarter: 10–17, 8–8, 8–9, 3–13
Pts: Kebe 8 Rebs: Dieme 14; Asts: Ndiaye 3		Pts: A. Traore 13; Rebs: A. Traore 19; Asts: A. Traore 4

Švyturys Arena, Klaipėda
Referees: Maripier Malo (CAN), Abdelaziz Abassi (TUN), Aledy Blanco Jiménez (CRC)

22 July 2013
13:30

Boxscore

South Korea	87–60	Argentina
Scoring by quarter: 25–19, 17–7, 22–10, 23–24
Pts: Kim Min-Jeong, Park Ji-Su 16; Rebs: Park Ji-Su 15; Asts: Park Ji-Su 6		Pts: Llorente 21; Rebs: Llorente 11; Asts: Sancisi 5

Švyturys Arena, Klaipėda
Referees: Pualani Thelma Spurlock (USA), Wen Keming (CHN), Ceciline Victor (IND)

23 July 2013
11:15

Boxscore

Senegal	64–97	South Korea
Scoring by quarter: 16–22, 13–19, 13–22, 22–24
Pts: Ndiaye 21; Rebs: Ndiaye 9 Asts: Diagne 4		Pts: Lee Seon-Young 16; Rebs: Park Ji-Su 9 Asts: Park Ji-Su 6

Švyturys Arena, Klaipėda
Referees: Tomas Jasevičius (LTU), Zoltán Palla (HUN), Ceciline Victor (IND)

23 July 2013
13:30

Boxscore

Mali	51–70	Argentina
Scoring by quarter: 10–24, 9–8, 16–24, 16–14
Pts: Dakouo 16; Rebs: three players 5 Asts: Kanoute, Guindo 3		Pts: Llorente 13; Rebs: Llorente 7 Asts: Sancisi, Chelini 3

Švyturys Arena, Klaipėda
Referees: Yudith Hodelin Mendoza (CUB), Cheung Kwok Shun Andy (HKG), Özlem Yalman (TUR)

24 July 2013
11:15

Boxscore

Argentina	62–40	Senegal
Scoring by quarter: 13–13, 14–8, 13–9, 20–10
Pts: Llorente 22; Rebs: Armesto 10; Asts: Armesto 6		Pts: Dieme 13; Rebs: Diallo 13; Asts: Dieme 3

Švyturys Arena, Klaipėda
Referees: Seffi Shemmesh (ISR), Zoltán Palla (HUN), Abdelaziz Abassi (TUN)

24 July 2013
13:30

Boxscore

South Korea	76–57	Mali
Scoring by quarter: 14–16, 20–18, 18–10, 24–13
Pts: Shin Ki-Jyun 21; Rebs: Park Ji-Su 13; Asts: Kim Lee-Seul 9		Pts: Kanoute 25; Rebs: Koné 6 Asts: Kanoute, Koné 3

Švyturys Arena, Klaipėda
Referees: Renaud Geller (BEL), Maripier Malo (CAN), Wen Keming (CHN)

== Eighth-final round ==
=== Group E ===
Team	Pld	W	L	PF	PA	PD	Pts
Spain	6	6	0	386	292	+94	12
Australia	6	5	1	482	387	+95	11
Brazil	6	4	2	363	345	+18	10
Japan	6	3	3	469	463	+6	9
Russia	6	2	4	447	459	−12	8
Serbia	6	1	5	380	481	−101	7

22 July 2013
15:45

Boxscore

Australia	96–72	Russia
Scoring by quarter: 25–10, 25–25, 27–16, 19–21
Pts: Mijović 19; Rebs: Mijović 10; Asts: Samuels 6		Pts: Razheva 19; Rebs: Shchetina 11; Asts: Gladkova 4

Švyturys Arena, Klaipėda
Referees: Seffi Shemmesh (ISR), Yudith Hodelin Mendoza (CUB), Krishna Viveros (MEX)

22 July 2013
18:00

Boxscore

Japan	66–70	Brazil
Scoring by quarter: 15–15, 19–20, 12–18, 20–17
Pts: Kawamura 20; Rebs: Kawamura 16; Asts: Kuma 7		Pts: Gonçalves, Ramona 23; Rebs: Ramona 11; Asts: Sangalli 4

Švyturys Arena, Klaipėda
Referees: Tomas Jasevičius (LTU), Zoltán Palla (HUN), Özlem Yalman (TUR)

22 July 2013
20:15

Boxscore

Spain	73–55	Serbia
Scoring by quarter: 22–9, 13–13, 17–18, 21–15
Pts: Ndour 23; Rebs: Ndour 13; Asts: Montoliu 5		Pts: Crvendakić 16; Rebs: Crvendakić 10; Asts: Stanaćev 8

Švyturys Arena, Klaipėda
Referees: Renaud Geller (BEL), Anne Panther (GER), Cheung Kwok Shun Andy (HKG)

23 July 2013
15:45

Boxscore

Brazil	51–69	Australia
Scoring by quarter: 12–11, 10–19, 16–22, 13–17
Pts: de Oliveira 16; Rebs: de Oliveira 6 Asts: Ribeiro 5		Pts: Samuels 21; Rebs: Wilson 10; Asts: three players 5

Švyturys Arena, Klaipėda
Referees: Seffi Shemmesh (ISR), Maripier Malo (CAN), Wen Keming (CHN)

23 July 2013
18:00

Boxscore

Serbia	67–87	Japan
Scoring by quarter: 17–23, 17–17, 12–29, 21–18
Pts: Kovačević 15; Rebs: Crvendakić 10; Asts: Crvendakić, Topuzović 4		Pts: Kawamura 22; Rebs: Masuoka 8 Asts: Tamura 10

Švyturys Arena, Klaipėda
Referees: Anne Panther (GER), Krishna Viveros (MEX), Aledy Blanco Jiménez (CRC)

23 July 2013
20:15

Boxscore

Russia	72–80	Spain
Scoring by quarter: 22–15, 17–19, 13–17, 20–29
Pts: Gladkova 18; Rebs: three players 7 Asts: Novikova 4		Pts: Arrojo 19; Rebs: Ndour 10; Asts: Romero Gonzaléz 5

Švyturys Arena, Klaipėda
Referees: Renaud Geller (BEL), Pualani Thelma Spurlock (USA), Abdelaziz Abassi (TUN)

24 July 2013
15:45

Boxscore

Australia	89–53	Serbia
Scoring by quarter: 20–14, 22–10, 30–12, 17–17
Pts: Mijović 15; Rebs: Garbin 11; Asts: Talbot 6		Pts: Crvendakić 13; Rebs: Topuzović 8 Asts: Crvendakić 4

Švyturys Arena, Klaipėda
Referees: Pualani Thelma Spurlock (USA), Cheung Kwok Shun Andy (HKG), Ceciline Victor (IND)

24 July 2013
18:00

Boxscore

Japan	88–78	Russia
Scoring by quarter: 27–23, 12–24, 27–17, 22–14
Pts: Kawamura 26; Rebs: Tamura 9 Asts: Masuoka 9		Pts: Razheva 22; Rebs: Shchetina 13; Asts: Novikova 7

Švyturys Arena, Klaipėda
Referees: Krishna Viveros (MEX), Yudith Hodelin Mendoza (CUB), Özlem Yalman (TUR)

24 July 2013
20:15

Boxscore

Spain	71–62	Brazil
Scoring by quarter: 13–15, 19–17, 25–15, 14–25
Pts: Gari 19; Rebs: Ndour 7 Asts: Romero Gonzaléz 4		Pts: Ramona 24; Rebs: Ramona 13; Asts: Teixeira 4

Švyturys Arena, Klaipėda
Referees: Tomas Jasevičius (LTU), Anne Panther (GER), Aledy Blanco Jiménez (CRC)

=== Group F ===
Team	Pld	W	L	PF	PA	PD	Pts
United States	6	6	0	509	225	+284	12
France	6	5	1	350	237	+113	11
China	6	4	2	426	399	+27	10
Canada	6	3	3	335	346	−11	9
Netherlands	6	2	4	384	441	−57	8
Lithuania	6	1	5	361	446	−85	7

22 July 2013
15:45

Boxscore

China	79–64	Canada
Scoring by quarter: 19–13, 18–14, 26–17, 16–20
Pts: Li Meng 22; Rebs: Zhang Jiahe, Zhang Liting 6 Asts: Zhang Jiahe 7		Pts: Wolfram 14; Rebs: Wolfram 8 Asts: Colley 4

Cido Arena, Panevėžys
Referees: Milos Koljensic (MNE), Alexander Eger (AUT), Timothy Brown (NZL)

22 July 2013
18:00

Boxscore

Lithuania	53–65	France
Scoring by quarter: 12–12, 10–22, 14–17, 17–14
Pts: Tamasauskaitė 14; Rebs: Sarauskaitė 9 Asts: Belickaitė 4		Pts: Djaldi-Tabdi 16; Rebs: Badiane 10; Asts: Epoupa 5

Cido Arena, Panevėžys
Referees: Vander Lobosco Nunes (BRA), Fabricio Leonardo Vito (ARG), Kim Bo-Hui (KOR)

22 July 2013
20:15

Boxscore

United States	102–42	Netherlands
Scoring by quarter: 30–15, 26–4, 15–12, 21–11
Pts: Wilson 20; Rebs: Wilson 8 Asts: Jones 4		Pts: Zappeij, Treffers 11; Rebs: Treffers, Hof 7 Asts: Zappeij 3

Cido Arena, Panevėžys
Referees: Saverio Lanzarini (ITA), Jelena Tomić (CRO), Ilya Putenko (RUS)

23 July 2013
15:45

Boxscore

France	62–43	China
Scoring by quarter: 18–12, 9–7, 20–13, 15–11
Pts: Ayayi 13; Rebs: Gaye 11; Asts: Ayayi 3		Pts: Yang Liwei 12; Rebs: Yang Hengyu 7 Asts: Li Meng, Yang Hengyu 2

Cido Arena, Panevėžys
Referees: Saverio Lanzarini (ITA), Timothy Brown (NZL), Ilya Putenko (RUS)

23 July 2013
18:00

Boxscore

Netherlands	72–65	Lithuania
Scoring by quarter: 15–15, 18–15, 15–17, 24–18
Pts: Treffers 21; Rebs: Treffers 12; Asts: Cornelius 8		Pts: Belickaitė 16; Rebs: Mizgerytė 9 Asts: Belickaitė 4

Cido Arena, Panevėžys
Referees: Milos Koljensic (MNE), Jelena Tomić (CRO), Alexander Eger (AUT)

23 July 2013
20:15

Boxscore

Canada	54–88	United States
Scoring by quarter: 16–25, 15–22, 11–31, 12–10
Pts: Weisner 14; Rebs: Weisner 7 Asts: six players 2		Pts: Jones 17; Rebs: Wilson 9 Asts: Jefferson, Jones 7

Cido Arena, Panevėžys
Referees: Vander Lobosco Nunes (BRA), Fabricio Leonardo Vito (ARG), Kim Bo-Hui (KOR)

24 July 2013
15:45

Boxscore

China	73–61	Netherlands
Scoring by quarter: 17–15, 18–16, 18–13, 20–17
Pts: Yang Hengyu 19; Rebs: Yang Hengyu 11; Asts: Yang Liwei, Hu Yaoming 4		Pts: Cornelius 18; Rebs: Cornelius 7 Asts: Slim 3

Cido Arena, Panevėžys
Referees: Saverio Lanzarini (ITA), Kim Bo-Hui (KOR), Fabricio Leonardo Vito (ARG)

24 July 2013
18:00

Boxscore

Lithuania	47–68	Canada
Scoring by quarter: 10–18, 10–16, 10–23, 17–11
Pts: Belickaitė 14; Rebs: Matuzonytė 9 Asts: Kraujunaitė 3		Pts: Potter 15; Rebs: Grant-Allen 9 Asts: Weisner 5

Cido Arena, Panevėžys
Referees: Vander Lobosco Nunes (BRA), Timothy Brown (NZL), Jelena Tomić (CRO)

24 July 2013
20:45

Boxscore

United States	69–63	France
Scoring by quarter: 19–15, 11–9, 24–22, 15–17
Pts: Stewart 22; Rebs: Wilson 9 Asts: Jones 5		Pts: Gaye 18; Rebs: Epoupa 10; Asts: Turčinović 4

Cido Arena, Panevėžys
Referees: Milos Koljensic (MNE), Ilya Putenko (RUS), Alexander Eger (AUT)

== Knockout stage ==
=== Bracket ===
Quarter-finals
July 26
Spain	80
Canada	62
July 26
France	51
Brazil	39
July 26
Australia	74
China	65
July 26
Japan	67
United States	108

Semi-finals
July 27
Spain	58
France	62
July 27
Australia	54
United States	77

Final
July 28
France	28
United States	61
Third place
July 28
Spain	68
Australia	73

5th place bracket

Semi-finals
July 27
Canada	63
Brazil	70
July 27
China	70
Japan	49

Fifth place
July 28
Brazil	65
China	68
Seventh place
July 28
Canada	75
Japan	64

9th place bracket

Semi-finals
July 26
Russia	82
Lithuania	68
July 26
Netherlands	66
Serbia	65

Ninth place
July 27
Russia	83
Netherlands	80
Eleventh place
July 27
Lithuania	36
Serbia	84

=== Quarterfinals ===
26 July 2013
11:15

Boxscore

Spain	80–62	Canada
Scoring by quarter: 14–16, 22–21, 15–18, 29–7
Pts: Gari 20; Rebs: Ndour 7 Asts: Romero Gonzaléz 11		Pts: Wolfram 13; Rebs: Colley 8 Asts: Colley 5

Švyturys Arena, Klaipėda
Referees: Tomas Jasevičius (LTU), Yudith Hodelin Mendoza (CUB), Alexander Eger (AUT)

26 July 2013
13:30

Boxscore

Brazil	39–51	France
Scoring by quarter: 12–20, 7–11, 14–6, 6–14
Pts: Gonçalves 11; Rebs: Gonçalves 9 Asts: Ramona 3		Pts: Ayayi 18; Rebs: Djaldi-Tabdi 9 Asts: Epoupa 4

Švyturys Arena, Klaipėda
Referees: Saverio Lanzarini (ITA), Pualani Thelma Spurlock (USA), Anne Panther (GER)

26 July 2013
18:00

Boxscore

Australia	74–65	China
Scoring by quarter: 17–10, 13–14, 20–17, 24–24
Pts: Talbot 22; Rebs: Wilson 12; Asts: Tupaea 6		Pts: Li Meng 28; Rebs: Yang Hengyu 9 Asts: Yang Liwei 5

Švyturys Arena, Klaipėda
Referees: Renaud Geller (BEL), Maripier Malo (CAN), Jelena Tomić (CRO)

26 July 2013
20:15

Boxscore

Japan	67–108	United States
Scoring by quarter: 11–23, 21–28, 14–30, 21–27
Pts: Kitamura 17; Rebs: Nakamura 5 Asts: Tamura 5		Pts: Wilson 19; Rebs: Stewart 10; Asts: Harper 8

Švyturys Arena, Klaipėda
Referees: Krishna Viveros (MEX), Ceciline Victor (IND), Zoltán Palla (HUN)

=== Classification 9–12 ===
26 July 2013
09:00

Boxscore

Serbia	65–66	Netherlands
Scoring by quarter: 16–21, 17–17, 18–7, 14–21
Pts: Vučković 14; Rebs: Topuzović 8 Asts: Stanaćev 7		Pts: Treffers 16; Rebs: Treffers, Hof 10; Asts: Cornelius, de Jonge 4

Švyturys Arena, Klaipėda
Referees: Seffi Shemmesh (ISR), Özlem Yalman (TUR), Abdelaziz Abassi (TUN)

26 July 2013
15:45

Boxscore

Russia	82–68	Lithuania
Scoring by quarter: 15–12, 18–21, 21–21, 28–14
Pts: Shchetina 19; Rebs: Shchetina 16; Asts: Novikova 6		Pts: Belickaitė 18; Rebs: Sarauskaitė 9 Asts: Belickaitė 4

Švyturys Arena, Klaipėda
Referees: Fabricio Leonardo Vito (ARG), Wen Keming (CHN), Milos Koljensic (MNE)

=== Classification 5–8 ===
27 July 2013
11:15

Boxscore

Canada	63–70	Brazil
Scoring by quarter: 6–29, 19–13, 19–15, 19–13
Pts: Weisner 30; Rebs: Wolfram 10; Asts: Dornstauder 4		Pts: Ramona 26; Rebs: Arias 11; Asts: Teixeira 4

Švyturys Arena, Klaipėda
Referees: Milos Koljensic (MNE), Jelena Tomić (CRO), Ceciline Victor (IND)

27 July 2013
13:30

Boxscore

China	70–49	Japan
Scoring by quarter: 15–7, 22–15, 9–14, 24–13
Pts: Huang Sijing 15; Rebs: Zhang Liting 17; Asts: Li Meng 3		Pts: Kitamura 13; Rebs: Nakamura 8 Asts: Tamura 2

Švyturys Arena, Klaipėda
Referees: Vander Lobosco Nunes (BRA), Ilya Putenko (RUS), Özlem Yalman (TUR)

=== Semifinals ===
27 July 2013
18:00

Boxscore

Spain	58–62	France
Scoring by quarter: 15–20, 12–6, 13–16, 18–20
Pts: Ndour 27; Rebs: Ndour 10; Asts: Romero Gonzaléz, Gari 5		Pts: Turčinović 13; Rebs: Ayayi 9 Asts: Epoupa 7

Švyturys Arena, Klaipėda
Referees: Tomas Jasevičius (LTU), Fabricio Leonardo Vito (ARG), Timothy Brown (NZL)

27 July 2013
20:15

Boxscore

Australia	54–77	United States
Scoring by quarter: 14–11, 6–27, 17–19, 17–20
Pts: Talbot 11; Rebs: Talbot, Wilson 6 Asts: Talbot 5		Pts: Stewart 23; Rebs: Stewart 8 Asts: Jones, Harper 5

Švyturys Arena, Klaipėda
Referees: Seffi Shemmesh (ISR), Krishna Viveros (MEX), Anne Panther (GER)

=== Eleventh-place game ===
27 July 2013
15:45

Boxscore

Lithuania	36–84	Serbia
Scoring by quarter: 11–30, 10–17, 10–20, 5–17
Pts: Belickaitė 10; Rebs: Belickaitė, Vitunskaitė 6 Asts: Belickaitė 4		Pts: Kovačević, Topuzović 13; Rebs: Vučković 6 Asts: Crvendakić 5

Švyturys Arena, Klaipėda
Referees: Alexander Eger (AUT), Maripier Malo (CAN), Kim Bo-Hui (KOR)

=== Ninth-place game ===
27 July 2013
09:00

Boxscore

Russia	83–80	Netherlands
Scoring by quarter: 18–19, 26–18, 23–21, 16–22
Pts: Novikova 18; Rebs: Shchetina 10; Asts: Novikova 5		Pts: Cornelius 25; Rebs: Treffers 8 Asts: Cornelius 3

Švyturys Arena, Klaipėda
Referees: Zoltán Palla (HUN), Cheung Kwok Shun Andy (HKG), Aledy Blanco Jiménez (CRC)

=== Seventh-place game ===
28 July 2013
13:30

Boxscore

Canada	75–64	Japan
Scoring by quarter: 23–14, 22–19, 13–21, 17–10
Pts: Weisner 20; Rebs: Weisner 16; Asts: Colley 4		Pts: Kawamura 18; Rebs: Kawamura 9 Asts: Tamura, Kuma 6

Švyturys Arena, Klaipėda
Referees: Fabricio Leonardo Vito (ARG), Wen Keming (CHN), Timothy BROWN (NZL)

=== Fifth-place game ===
28 July 2013
15:45

Boxscore

Brazil	65–68	China
Scoring by quarter: 16–21, 11–19, 20–12, 18–16
Pts: Ramona 23; Rebs: Gonçalves 11; Asts: Ramona 4		Pts: Yang Liwei 13; Rebs: Yang Hengyu 8 Asts: Yang Liwei, Hu Yaoming 4

Švyturys Arena, Klaipėda
Referees: Krishna VIVEROS (MEX), Ilya Putenko (RUS), Abdelaziz Abassi (TUN)

=== Bronze-medal game ===
28 July 2013
18:00

Boxscore

Spain	68–73	Australia
Scoring by quarter: 15–13, 24–12, 12–18, 17–30
Pts: Romero Gonzaléz 16; Rebs: Ndour 11; Asts: Romero Gonzaléz 4		Pts: Mijović 25; Rebs: Talbot 9 Asts: Samuels 4

Švyturys Arena, Klaipėda
Referees: Saverio Lanzarini (ITA), Pualani Thelma Spurlock (USA), Vander Lobosco Nunes (BRA)

=== Final ===
28 July 2013
20:15

Boxscore

France	28–61	United States
Scoring by quarter: 8–17, 12–10, 6–20, 2–14
Pts: Epoupa 9 Rebs: Badiane 6 Asts: Epoupa, Gaye 1		Pts: Stewart 16; Rebs: Stewart 9 Asts: Jefferson 5

Švyturys Arena, Klaipėda
Referees: Renaud Geller (BEL), Yudith Hodelin Mendoza (CUB), Kim Bo-Hui (KOR)

== Statistical leaders ==
- Tournament is still yet to be completed, so statistics are not final

Points

Name	PPG
(Brazil) Isabela Ramona	17.6
(Spain) Astou Ndour	17.0
(Canada) Jamie Weisner	16.6
(United States) Breanna Stewart	16.1
(Japan) Miyuki Kawamara	15.9

Rebounds

Name	RPG
(South Korea) Park Ji-su	13.2
(Russia) Anna Shchetina	10.6
(United States) A'ja Wilson	9.4
(France) Marieme Badiane	9.3
(Spain) Astou Ndour	9.1

Assists

Name	APG
(Japan) Mirai Tamura	5.9
(Australia) Stephanie Talbot	4.9
(Russia) Olga Novikova	5.6
(United States) Alexis Jones	4.4
(China) Yang Liwei	4.3

Blocks

Name	BPG
(Lithuania) Daugile Sarauskaite	3.3
(Russia) Anna Shchetina	2.6
(United States) A'ja Wilson	2.0
(Spain) Astou Ndour	1.9
(South Korea) Park Ji-su	1.8

Steals

Name	SPG
(France) Olivia Epoupa	3.6
(Spain) Leticia Romero	3.0
(Russia) Olga Novikova	2.6
(United States) Morgan Tuck	2.6
(Mali) Hawa Traore	2.5

== Final standings ==
Rank	Team
1st place, gold medalist(s)	United States
2nd place, silver medalist(s)	France
3rd place, bronze medalist(s)	Australia
4th	Spain
5th	China
6th	Brazil
7th	Canada
8th	Japan
9th	Russia
10th	Netherlands
11th	Serbia
12th	Lithuania
13th	South Korea
14th	Argentina
15th	Mali
16th	Senegal

== Awards ==
2013 Under-19 World Championship for Women winner

United States
Sixth title

Most Valuable Player
(United States) Breanna Stewart

All-Tournament Team

- (United States) Breanna Stewart
- (France) Olivia Epoupa
- (Canada) Jamie Weisner
- (Australia) Stephanie Talbot
- (Spain) Astou Ndour

== Referees ==
FIBA named 25 referees that officiated at the tournament.

- (Argentina) Fabricio Leonardo Vito
- (Austria) Alexander Eger
- (Belgium) Renaud Geller
- (Brazil) Vander Lobosco Nunes
- (Canada) Maripier Malo
- (China) Wen Keming
- (Costa Rica) Aledy Blanco Jiménez
- (Ivory Coast) Kouakou Toussaint Niamien
- (Croatia) Jelena Tomić
- (Cuba) Yudith Hodelin Mendoza
- (Germany) Anne Panther
- (Hong Kong) Cheung Kwok Shun Andy
- (Hungary) Zoltán Palla
- (India) Ceciline Victor
- (Israel) Seffi Shemmesh
- (Italy) Saverio Lanzarini
- (South Korea) Kim Bo-Hui
- (Lithuania) Tomas Jasevičius
- (Mexico) Krishna Viveros
- (Montenegro) Milos Koljensic
- (New Zealand) Timothy Brown
- (Russia) Ilya Putenko
- (United States) Pualani Thelma Spurlock
- (Tunisia) Abdelaziz Abassi
- (Turkey) Özlem Yalman
