= Jaworski =

Jaworski (Polish pronunciation: [jaˈvɔrskʲi]; feminine: Jaworska, plural: Jaworscy) is a surname of Polish-language origin. It is related to a number of surnames in other languages.

== Related surnames ==
Language	Masculine	Feminine
Polish	Jaworski	Jaworska
Hungarian	Jávorszki (standard spelling); Jávorszky (irregular but frequent form)	
Czech/Slovak	Javorský	Javorská
Romanian/Moldovan	Iavorschi	—N/a
Russian (Romanization)	Яворский (Yavorskiy, Yavorsky, Iavorski, Javorskij)	Яворская (Yavorskaya, Yavorskaia, Iavorskaia, Javorskaja)
Ukrainian (Romanization)	Яворський (Yavorskyi, Yavorskyy, Iavorskyi, Javorskyj)	Яворська (Yavorska, Iavorska, Javorska)

== People ==
=== Jaworski/Jaworska ===
- Beata Jaworska (born 1994), Polish basketball player
- Chet Jaworski (1916–2003), American basketball player
- Daniela Jaworska (born 1946), Polish athlete
- Jakub Jaworski (born 1986), Polish speed skater
- Leon Jaworski (1905–1982), American attorney
- Łukasz Jaworski (born 1981), Polish film and television director
- Magdalena Jaworska (1961–1994), Polish model
- Maria Daria Jaworska (1921–2022), Polish-Canadian physician
- Marian Jaworski (1926–2020), Polish cardinal
- Matt Jaworski (born 1967), American football player
- Mikee Cojuangco-Jaworski (born 1974) Filipino equestrian
- Paul Jaworski (1900–1929), American gangster
- Rafał Jaworski (born 1973), Polish historian
- Renata Jaworska (born 1979), Polish artist
- Robert Jaworski (born 1946), Filipino basketball player and politician
- Robert Jaworski Jr. (born 1972), Filipino basketball player
- Ron Jaworski (born 1951), American football player
- Jean-Philippe Jaworski (born 1969), French fantasy writer
- Tadeusz Jaworski (born 1945), Polish runner
- Walery Jaworski (1849–1924), Polish gastroenterologist

=== Related surnames ===
- Boleslav Yavorsky (1877–1942), Russian musicologist
- Constantin Iavorschi (born 1990), Moldovan football player
- Jiří Javorský (1932–2002), Czech tennis player
- Nikolai Yavorsky (1891–1947), Cuban choreographer
- Serhiy Yavorskyi (born 1989), Ukrainian football player
- Stefan Yavorsky (1658–1722), archbishop and statesman in the Russian Empire
- Taras Yavorskyi (born 1989), Ukrainian football player
- Vadym Yavorskyi (born 1994), Ukrainian football player
- Vladimír Javorský (born 1962), Czech actor
