= Ružica Džankić =

Croatian basketball player

BG Göttingen
- Title: Assistant coach
- League: ProA

Personal information
- Born: July 7, 1994 (age 32) Zagreb, Croatia
- Listed height: 1.81 m (5 ft 11 in)

Career information
- WNBA draft: 2016: undrafted
- Playing career: 2010–2022
- Position: Small forward
- Coaching career: 2022–present

Career history

Playing
- 2010–2012: Croatia 2006
- 2012–2016: Medveščak
- 2016–2017: Enisey Krasnoyarsk
- 2017–2018: Sepsi Sfântu Gheorghe
- 2018–2019: PINKK-Pécsi 424
- 2019–2020: Ponzano Basket
- 2020–2022: BG74 Göttingen

Coaching
- 2022–present: BG74 Göttingen
- 2025–present: BG Göttingen

Ružica Džankić (born 7 July 1994 in Zagreb, Croatia) is a Croatian professional basketball coach and former female basketball player. She is currently working as an assistant coach of the BG Göttingen of the ProA.
