= Miyuki Kawamura =

Japanese basketball player

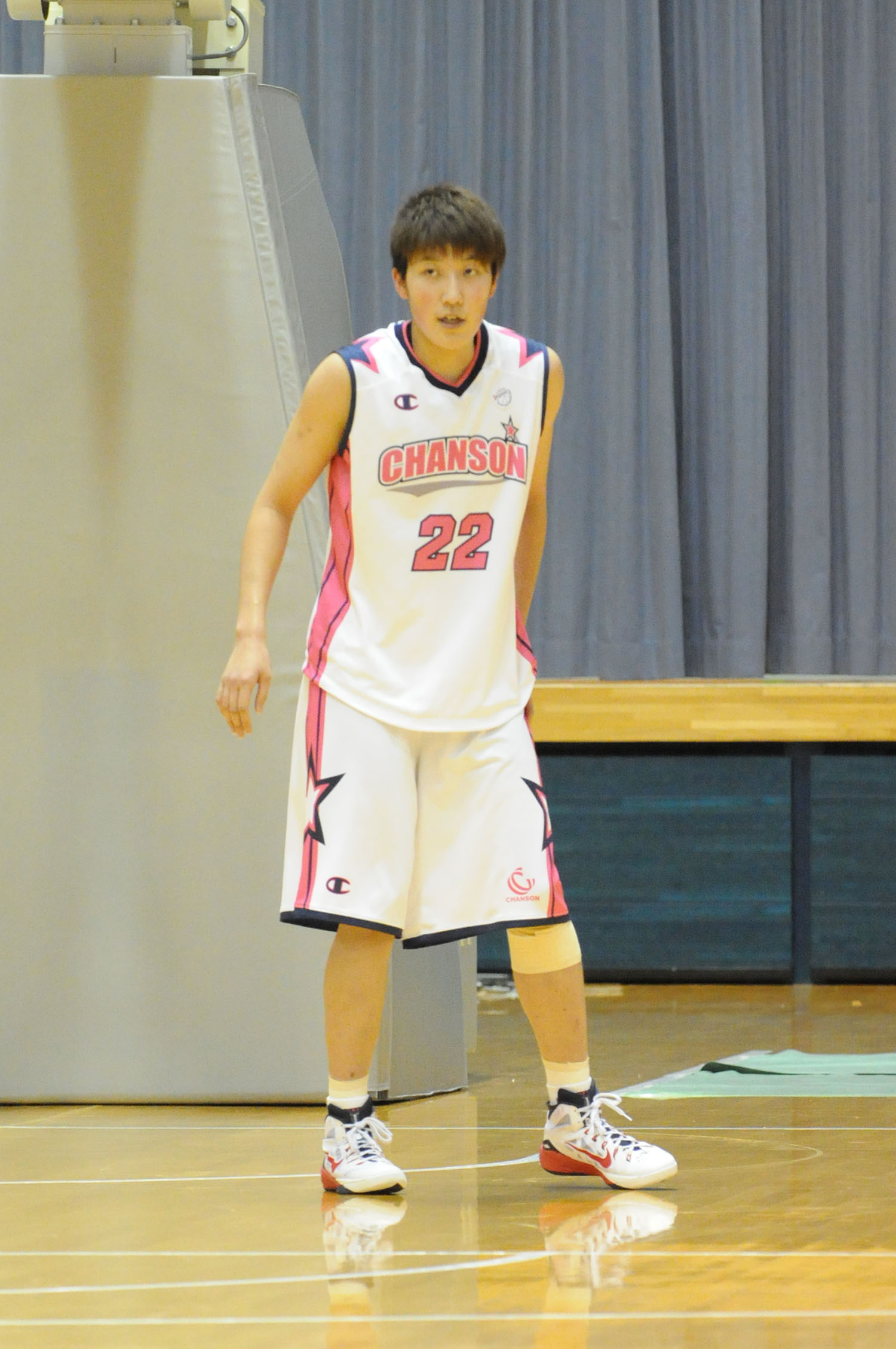

No. 22 – Chanson V-Magic
- Position: Power forward
- League: JBL

Personal information
- Born: October 27, 1994 (age 32) Aichi Prefecture, Japan
- Listed height: 6 ft 1 in (1.85 m)

Miyuki Kawamura (河村 美幸, Kawamura Miyuki; born October 27, 1994) is a Japanese basketball player for Chanson V-Magic and the Japanese national team.

She participated at the 2017 FIBA Women's Asia Cup.
