= Beata Jaworska =

Polish basketball player

Personal information
- Born: 17 April 1994 (age 32) Zielona Góra, Poland
- Listed height: 1.88 m (6 ft 2 in)

Career information
- Playing career: 2011–present
- Position: Power forward / center

Career history
- 2011-2012: Szprotavia Szprotawa
- 2012-present: AZS PWSZ Gorzów Wielkopolski

Beata Jaworska (Polish pronunciation: [bɛˈata jaˈvɔrska]; born 17 April 1994) is a Polish female professional basketball player.
