= Lidija Turčinović =

Serbian-French basketball player

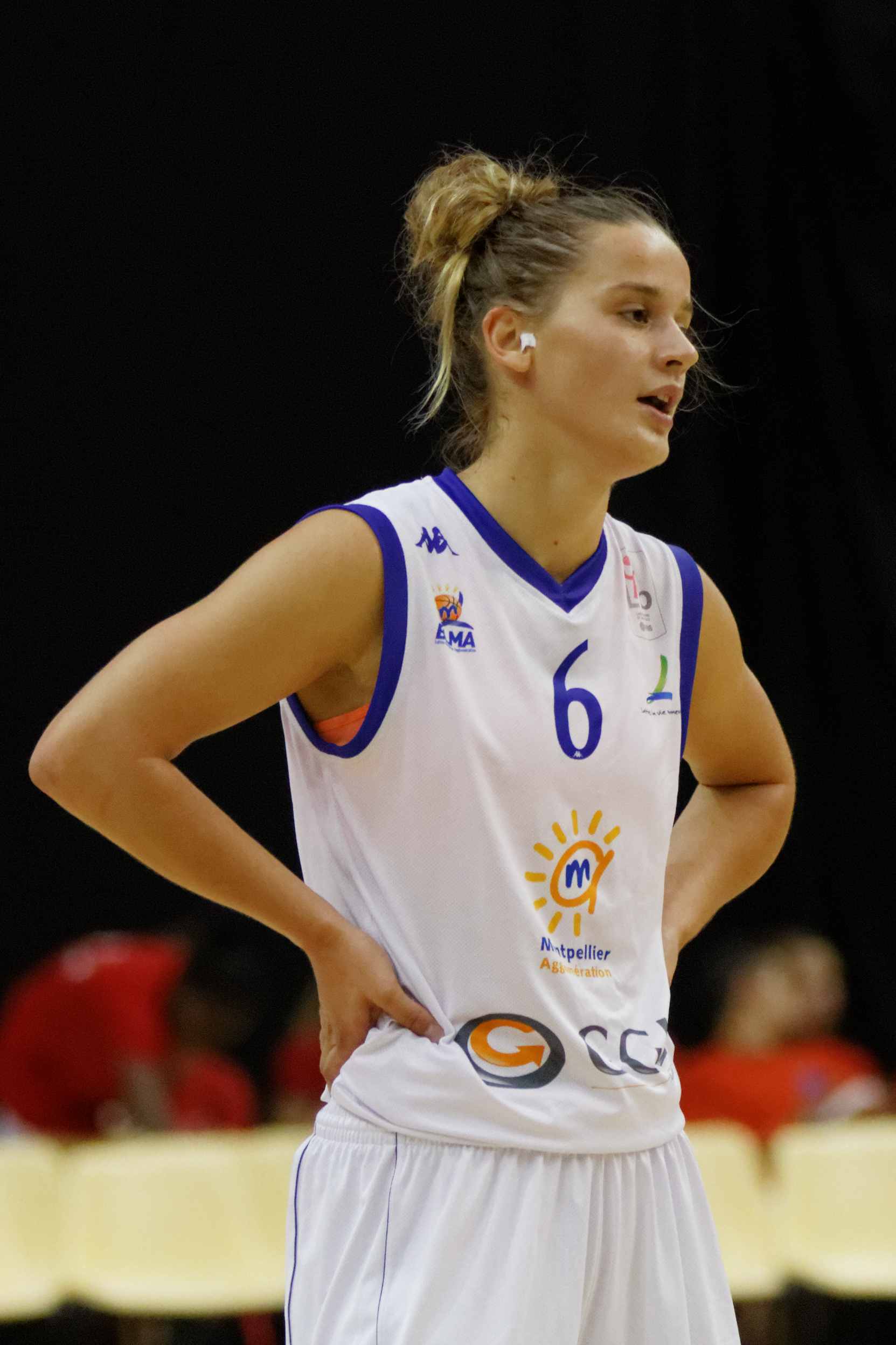

Basket Landes
- Position: Small forward
- League: Ligue Féminine

Personal information
- Born: 27 August 1994 (age 32) Belgrade, FR Yugoslavia
- Listed height: 1.79 m (5 ft 10 in)

Career information
- Playing career: 2012–present

Career history
- 2012–2014: Basket Lattes Montpellier
- 2014-2015: ASPTT Arras
- 2015–2016: Toulouse Métropole
- 2016–2017: Flammes Carolo
- 2017–2018: Rezé-Nantes Basket 44
- 2018–2020: ASVEL Féminin
- 2018–present: Basket Landes

Lidija Turčinović (Serbian Cyrillic: Лидија Турчиновић; born 27 August 1994) is a Serbian-French women's basketball player.

In May 2018, she was signed by ASVEL Féminin, where she will play alongside Michelle Plouffe and Alysha Clark.

== Honours ==
=== Clubs ===
Basket Lattes Montpellier

- Ligue Féminine (1): 2013-14
- French national Cup (1): 2012-13

=== National team ===
France

- FIBA Europe Under-20 Championship for Women (1): 2014 (winner)
- FIBA Europe Under-18 Championship for Women (1): 2012 (winner)
- FIBA Under-19 World Championship for Women (1): 2013 (Runner up)
