= Nataša Kovačević =

Serbian basketball player (born 1994)

Nataša Kovačević-Stojaković
Personal information
- Born: 20 May 1994 (age 32) Belgrade, FR Yugoslavia
- Listed height: 1.88 m (6 ft 2 in)

Career information
- WNBA draft: 2016: undrafted
- Playing career: 2008–2013, 2015–2016
- Position: Small forward
- Number: 7

Career history
- 2008–2010: Partizan
- 2010–2012: Voždovac
- 2013: Crvena zvezda
- 2013: UNI Győr
- 2015–2016: Crvena zvezda

Career highlights
- Serbian Cup winner (2016)
Medals
Women's basketball
Representing Serbia
European U18 Championship
Bronze medal – third place	2012 Romania	Team

Nataša Kovačević-Stojaković (née Kovačević; Serbian Cyrillic: Наташа Ковачевић-Стојаковић, née Ковачевић; born 20 May 1994) is a Serbian former professional basketball player.

Standing at 6 ft 2 in (1.88 m), she played in the small forward position for Serbian League teams Partizan, Voždovac, and Crvena zvezda, as well as for UNI Győr in Hungary. She won a national cup with Crvena zvezda in 2016. Kovačević-Stojaković played on the Serbia national team, winning a bronze medal at the U20 European basketball Championship in 2012.

== Professional career ==
Kovačević began her in Partizan in 2008. In the 2008–09 season with Partizan, she won second place in the Serbian League championship. In January 2010, she moved to Voždovac. In the 2010–11 season with Voždovac, she played in the Adriatic League and Serbian League where her team took ninth and fifth place, respectively. The following season, her team was eliminated in the semifinals, winning the bronze medal of the play-off.

By the end of December 2012 Kovačević still played for Voždovac, which played in the Adriatic League. As the club went into financial problems, she moved to become a player of Crvena zvezda in January 2013. With Crvena zvezda, she reached the semi-finals of the Serbian League. In the third-place game series, Crvena zvezda beat Vojvodina with a cumulative score of 190–187, winning the third place. In June 2013, she signed a contract with the Hungarian UNI Győr.

On 7 September 2013, while on the road together with a team of UNI Győr set for the match against UNIQA Euroleasing Sopron, a traffic accident occurred, which killed the coach Ákos Fűzy and general manager of the club Péter Tapodi. As a result of the injury, Kovačević had her left leg amputated below the knee. Following the accident, on 28 February 2014, FIBA Europe has been proclaimed her as an ambassador for young people. On 13 March 2014 she established a foundation that will carry her name, and which, as she said, is established to help young athletes.

In November 2015, Kovačević signed a contract with Crvena zvezda, following recovery from a leg amputation. During this season, has won the Milan Ciga Vasojević Cup and lost in the final of Radivoj Korać. On 9 August 2016, she announced her retirement from her playing career at age 22 and became the president of Crvena zvezda.

== International career ==
During her career, she represented Serbia in several junior age groups: U16, U18, U19 and U20. She took part in the U16 European Championship three times, from 2008 until 2010. Twice she represented Serbia at U18 European Championship in 2011 and 2012; in the second year, winning a bronze medal. She also took part in 2013 in U19 World Championships and once in U20 European Championship.

== Post-playing career ==
On 9 August 2016 she became the president of the Crvena zvezda women's team. In September 2017, she resigned.

== Personal life ==
Nataša's father is Vukašin Kovačević, a former handball player, and her mother is a Natalija Bacanović, a former basketball player who won the Euroleague in 1979 with Crvena zvezda. Her brother is Ivan Kovačević, Serbian diplomat.

In 2021, French President Emmanuel Macron awarded Kovačević with the highest order of France, Legion of Honour.

On 5 March 2022, she married Vuk Stojaković in the Church of Saint Sava, Belgrade.

The Ambassador of France to Serbia, Pierre Cochard, handed to Kovačević-Stojaković an National Order of Merit, the French second highest civilian honor, on 14 April 2022.

Sporting positions
Preceded by Branko Jocić	President of the ŽKK Crvena zvezda 2016–2017	Succeeded by Anđelka Vukmirović Radulović
